= 2008–09 NHL transactions =

The following is a list of all team-to-team transactions that have occurred in the National Hockey League during the 2008–09 NHL season. It lists what team each player has been traded to, signed by, or claimed by, and for which players or draft picks, if applicable.

The 2008–09 NHL trade deadline was on March 4, 2009. Players traded or claimed off waivers after that date were not be eligible to play in the 2009 Stanley Cup playoffs.

== Retirement ==
Date	Team	Name
March 10, 2009	Gary Roberts	Tampa Bay Lightning
May 4, 2009	Markus Naslund	New York Rangers
May 23, 2009	Bobby Holik	New Jersey Devils
June 15, 2009	Derian Hatcher	Philadelphia Flyers

== Free agency ==
Note: This does not include players who have re-signed with their previous team as an unrestricted free agent or as a restricted free agent.

Date	Player	New team	Previous team
July 1, 2008	Radim Vrbata	Tampa Bay Lightning	Phoenix Coyotes
July 1, 2008	Curtis Joseph	Toronto Maple Leafs	Calgary Flames
July 1, 2008	Andrew Brunette	Minnesota Wild	Colorado Avalanche
July 1, 2008	Kurt Sauer	Phoenix Coyotes	Colorado Avalanche
July 1, 2008	Jose Theodore	Washington Capitals	Colorado Avalanche
July 1, 2008	Andrew Raycroft	Colorado Avalanche	Toronto Maple Leafs
July 1, 2008	Ty Conklin	Detroit Red Wings	Pittsburgh Penguins
July 1, 2008	Todd Fedoruk	Phoenix Coyotes	Minnesota Wild
July 1, 2008	Jeff Finger	Toronto Maple Leafs	Colorado Avalanche
July 1, 2008	Adam Hall	Tampa Bay Lightning	Pittsburgh Penguins
July 1, 2008	Cory Stillman	Florida Panthers	Ottawa Senators
July 1, 2008	Cristobal Huet	Chicago Blackhawks	Washington Capitals
July 1, 2008	Eric Godard	Pittsburgh Penguins	Calgary Flames
July 1, 2008	Aaron Voros	New York Rangers	Minnesota Wild
July 1, 2008	Darcy Tucker	Colorado Avalanche	Toronto Maple Leafs
July 1, 2008	Olaf Kolzig	Tampa Bay Lightning	Washington Capitals
July 1, 2008	Alex Auld	Ottawa Senators	Boston Bruins
July 1, 2008	Patrick Lalime	Buffalo Sabres	Chicago Blackhawks
July 1, 2008	Brian Campbell	Chicago Blackhawks	San Jose Sharks
July 1, 2008	Mike Commodore	Columbus Blue Jackets	Ottawa Senators
July 1, 2008	Sean Curry	Philadelphia Flyers	Boston Bruins
July 1, 2008	Patrick Rissmiller	New York Rangers	San Jose Sharks
July 1, 2008	Brian Rolston	New Jersey Devils	Tampa Bay Lightning
July 1, 2008	Glen Metropolit	Philadelphia Flyers	Boston Bruins
July 1, 2008	Nate Raduns	Philadelphia Flyers	San Jose Sharks
July 1, 2008	Darcy Hordichuk	Vancouver Canucks	Nashville Predators
July 1, 2008	Niklas Hagman	Toronto Maple Leafs	Dallas Stars
July 1, 2008	Bobby Holik	New Jersey Devils	Atlanta Thrashers
July 1, 2008	Wade Redden	New York Rangers	Ottawa Senators
July 1, 2008	David Koci	Tampa Bay Lightning	Chicago Blackhawks
July 1, 2008	Craig Weller	Minnesota Wild	Phoenix Coyotes
July 1, 2008	Mark Streit	New York Islanders	Montreal Canadiens
July 1, 2008	Drew MacIntyre	Nashville Predators	Vancouver Canucks
July 1, 2008	Michael Ryder	Boston Bruins	Montreal Canadiens
July 2, 2008	Ryan Johnson	Vancouver Canucks	St. Louis Blues
July 2, 2008	Marian Hossa	Detroit Red Wings	Pittsburgh Penguins
July 2, 2008	Curtis Glencross	Calgary Flames	Edmonton Oilers
July 2, 2008	Sean Avery	Dallas Stars	New York Rangers
July 2, 2008	Peter Vandermeer	Calgary Flames	Phoenix Coyotes
July 2, 2008	Graham Mink	Washington Capitals	San Jose Sharks
July 2, 2008	Jarkko Ruutu	Ottawa Senators	Pittsburgh Penguins
July 2, 2008	Ron Hainsey	Atlanta Thrashers	Columbus Blue Jackets
July 2, 2008	Nolan Baumgartner	Vancouver Canucks	Dallas Stars
July 2, 2008	Doug Weight	New York Islanders	Anaheim Ducks
July 2, 2008	Yann Danis	New York Islanders	Montreal Canadiens
July 2, 2008	Kristian Huselius	Columbus Blue Jackets	Calgary Flames
July 2, 2008	Drew Fata	Phoenix Coyotes	New York Islanders
July 3, 2008	Garrett Stafford	Dallas Stars	Detroit Red Wings
July 3, 2008	Alex Henry	Montreal Canadiens	Nashville Predators
July 3, 2008	Brett Skinner	New York Islanders	Boston Bruins
July 3, 2008	Mike Iggulden	New York Islanders	San Jose Sharks
July 3, 2008	Keith Aucoin	Washington Capitals	Carolina Hurricanes
July 3, 2008	Georges Laraque	Montreal Canadiens	Pittsburgh Penguins
July 3, 2008	Markus Naslund	New York Rangers	Vancouver Canucks
July 3, 2008	Dimitri Kalinin	New York Rangers	Buffalo Sabres
July 3, 2008	Antti Miettinen	Minnesota Wild	Dallas Stars
July 3, 2008	David Hale	Phoenix Coyotes	Calgary Flames
July 3, 2008	Miroslav Satan	Pittsburgh Penguins	New York Islanders
July 3, 2008	Ruslan Fedotenko	Pittsburgh Penguins	New York Islanders
July 3, 2008	Rob Blake	San Jose Sharks	Los Angeles Kings
July 3, 2008	Chris Beckford-Tseu	Florida Panthers	St. Louis Blues
July 3, 2008	Rory Fitzpatrick	Florida Panthers	Philadelphia Flyers
July 3, 2008	Matt Walker	Chicago Blackhawks	St. Louis Blues
July 3, 2008	Marc Denis	Montreal Canadiens	Tampa Bay Lightning
July 3, 2008	Mitch Fritz	New York Islanders	Tampa Bay Lightning
July 3, 2008	Wyatt Smith	Tampa Bay Lightning	Colorado Avalanche
July 4, 2008	Mark Cullen	Vancouver Canucks	Detroit Red Wings
July 5, 2008	Matt Cooke	Pittsburgh Penguins	Washington Capitals
July 6, 2008	Owen Nolan	Minnesota Wild	Calgary Flames
July 6, 2008	Jesse Schultz	Minnesota Wild	Atlanta Thrashers
July 7, 2008	Todd Bertuzzi	Calgary Flames	Anaheim Ducks
July 7, 2008	Arron Asham	Philadelphia Flyers	New Jersey Devils
July 7, 2008	Mark Recchi	Tampa Bay Lightning	Atlanta Thrashers
July 7, 2008	Brendan Morrison	Anaheim Ducks	Vancouver Canucks
July 7, 2008	David LeNeveu	Anaheim Ducks	New York Rangers
July 7, 2008	Ryan Flinn	Montreal Canadiens	Edmonton Oilers
July 8, 2008	Joe Callahan	New York Islanders	Anaheim Ducks
July 8, 2008	Jason Smith	Ottawa Senators	Philadelphia Flyers
July 8, 2008	John Vigilante	Columbus Blue Jackets	Nashville Predators
July 8, 2008	T.J. Kemp	Pittsburgh Penguins	Edmonton Oilers
July 8, 2008	Brandon Bochenski	Tampa Bay Lightning	Nashville Predators
July 9, 2008	Junior Lessard	Atlanta Thrashers	Tampa Bay Lightning
July 9, 2008	Josh Gratton	Nashville Predators	New York Rangers
July 9, 2008	Matt Foy	St. Louis Blues	Minnesota Wild
July 9, 2008	Steve Regier	St. Louis Blues	New York Islanders
July 9, 2008	Mike Hoffman	Atlanta Thrashers	Anaheim Ducks
July 9, 2008	Grant Stevenson	Atlanta Thrashers	Calgary Flames
July 9, 2008	Andrew Hutchinson	Tampa Bay Lightning	New York Rangers
July 10, 2008	Aaron Johnson	Chicago Blackhawks	New York Islanders
July 10, 2008	Nathan Smith	Colorado Avalanche	Pittsburgh Penguins
July 10, 2008	Jason Strudwick	Edmonton Oilers	New York Rangers
July 10, 2008	Scott Clemmensen	New Jersey Devils	Toronto Maple Leafs
July 10, 2008	Joey Mormina	Pittsburgh Penguins	Carolina Hurricanes
July 10, 2008	Brad Winchester	St. Louis Blues	Dallas Stars
July 10, 2008	Mike Weaver	St. Louis Blues	Vancouver Canucks
July 10, 2008	Zenon Konopka	Tampa Bay Lightning	Columbus Blue Jackets
July 10, 2008	Rob Davison	Vancouver Canucks	New York Islanders
July 10, 2008	Pavol Demitra	Vancouver Canucks	Minnesota Wild
July 11, 2008	Steve Montador	Anaheim Ducks	Florida Panthers
July 11, 2008	Brendan Bell	Ottawa Senators	Phoenix Coyotes
July 11, 2008	Brennan Evans	Anaheim Ducks	San Jose Sharks
July 14, 2008	Jason Williams	Atlanta Thrashers	Chicago Blackhawks
July 14, 2008	Craig MacDonald	Columbus Blue Jackets	Tampa Bay Lightning
July 14, 2008	Joel Ward	Nashville Predators	Minnesota Wild
July 14, 2008	Jason Krog	Vancouver Canucks	Atlanta Thrashers
July 14, 2008	Matt Foy	St. Louis Blues	Minnesota Wild
July 15, 2008	Brian Willsie	Colorado Avalanche	Los Angeles Kings
July 15, 2008	Doug Janik	Chicago Blackhawks	Tampa Bay Lightning
July 15, 2008	Carl Corazzini	Edmonton Oilers	Detroit Red Wings
July 15, 2008	Jeff Hoggan	Phoenix Coyotes	Boston Bruins
July 15, 2008	Ryan Lannon	Phoenix Coyotes	Pittsburgh Penguins
July 15, 2008	Bill Thomas	Pittsburgh Penguins	Phoenix Coyotes
July 15, 2008	Brendan Buckley	San Jose Sharks	Los Angeles Kings
July 16, 2008	Steve Kelly	Columbus Blue Jackets	Minnesota Wild
July 16, 2008	Mike Glumac	Montreal Canadiens	St. Louis Blues
July 17, 2008	Marty Reasoner	Atlanta Thrashers	Edmonton Oilers
July 17, 2008	Andy Wozniewski	St. Louis Blues	Toronto Maple Leafs
July 17, 2008	Jon DiSalvatore	New Jersey Devils	Phoenix Coyotes
July 17, 2008	Jay Leach	New Jersey Devils	Anaheim Ducks
July 17, 2008	Matt Kinch	San Jose Sharks	Ottawa Senators
July 18, 2008	Garth Murray	Phoenix Coyotes	Florida Panthers
July 20, 2008	Andre Roy	Calgary Flames	Tampa Bay Lightning
July 23, 2008	Darren Haydar	Detroit Red Wings	Atlanta Thrashers
July 24, 2008	Mathieu Darche	To Buffalo Sabres	From Tampa Bay Lightning
July 25, 2008	Mike York	Columbus Blue Jackets	Phoenix Coyotes
September 3, 2008	Stephane Yelle	To Boston Bruins	From Calgary Flames
September 4, 2008	Brad Isbister	Ottawa Senators	Vancouver Canucks
October 14, 2008	Marek Malik	Tampa Bay Lightning	New York Rangers
December 17, 2008	Claude Lemieux	San Jose Sharks	Dallas Stars
December 18, 2008	Mats Sundin	Vancouver Canucks	Toronto Maple Leafs
January 14, 2009	Brendan Shanahan	New Jersey Devils	New York Rangers

== Trades ==
=== July ===
July 1, 2008	To Minnesota Wild Marek Zidlicky	To Nashville Predators Ryan Jones; 2nd-round pick in 2009 (#42 - Charles-Olivier Roussel)
July 1, 2008	To Columbus Blue Jackets Raffi Torres	To Edmonton Oilers Gilbert Brule
July 1, 2008	To Carolina Hurricanes Joni Pitkanen	To Edmonton Oilers Erik Cole
July 1, 2008	To Los Angeles Kings Denis Gauthier; 2nd-round pick in 2010 (MIN - #59 - Jason Zucker)^{1}	To Philadelphia Flyers Patrik Hersley; Ned Lukacevic
July 1, 2008	To Calgary Flames Rene Bourque	To Chicago Blackhawks conditional 2nd-round pick in 2009 or 2010 entry draft^{2} (TOR - #43 - Brad Ross)^{3}
July 2, 2008	To New York Rangers Nikolay Zherdev; Dan Fritsche	To Columbus Blue Jackets Fedor Tyutin; Christian Backman
July 3, 2008	To Toronto Maple Leafs Mikhail Grabovski	To Montreal Canadiens Greg Pateryn; 2nd-round pick in 2010 (BOS - #32 - Jared Knight)^{4}
July 4, 2008	To San Jose Sharks Dan Boyle; Brad Lukowich	To Tampa Bay Lightning Matt Carle; Ty Wishart; 1st-round pick in 2009 (ANA - #26 - Kyle Palmieri)^{5} 4th-round pick in 2010 (#118 - James Mullin)
July 4, 2008	To Buffalo Sabres Craig Rivet; 7th-round pick in 2010 (#208 - Riley Boychuk)	To San Jose Sharks 2nd-round pick in 2009 (#43 - William Wrenn); 2nd-round pick in 2010 (CAR - #53 - Mark Alt)^{6}
July 4, 2008	To Vancouver Canucks Steve Bernier	To Buffalo Sabres 3rd-round pick in 2009 (#66 - Brayden McNabb); 2nd-round pick in 2010 (CBJ - #55 - Petr Straka)^{7}
July 11, 2008	To Minnesota Wild Corey Locke	To Montreal Canadiens Shawn Belle
July 14, 2008	To Toronto Maple Leafs Ryan Hollweg	To New York Rangers 5th-round pick in 2009 (PIT - #151 - Andy Bathgate)^{8}
July 15, 2008	To Anaheim Ducks Joakim Lindstrom	To Columbus Blue Jackets conditional pick in 2010^{9} (4th-round - #102 - Mathieu Corbeil-Theriault)
July 17, 2008	To Chicago Blackhawks Tim Brent	To Pittsburgh Penguins Danny Richmond
July 21, 2008	To Dallas Stars Lauri Tukonen	To Los Angeles Kings Richard Clune
July 24, 2008	To Boston Bruins Martin St. Pierre	To Chicago Blackhawks Pascal Pelletier

1. Florida's acquired second-round pick went to Minnesota as the result of a trade on June 26, 2010, that send a third-round pick and a fourth-round pick in 2010 entry draft to Florida in exchange for this pick.
  Florida previously acquired the pick as the result of a trade on June 25, 2010, that sent a first-round pick (#15 overall) in the 2010 entry draft to Los Angeles in exchange for a first-round pick (#19 overall) in the 2010 entry draft and this pick.
2. The condition of this pick was at Calgary choice of the draft year. The condition was converted on March 4, 2009, when Calgary traded their second-round pick in the 2009 entry draft to Colorado making the pick for the 2010 entry draft.
3. Chicago's acquired second-round pick went to Toronto as the result of a trade on June 26, 2010, that sent Jimmy Hayes to Chicago in exchange for this pick.
4. Toronto's second-round pick went to Boston as the result of a trade on September 18, 2009, that sent Phil Kessel to Toronto in exchange for first-round picks in the 2010 entry draft and the 2011 entry draft along with this pick.
  Toronto re-acquired this pick as the result of a trade on September 5, 2009, that sent a second-round pick and a third-round pick in the 2011 entry draft to Chicago in exchange for this pick.
  Chicago previously acquired the pick as the result of a trade on September 12, 2008, that sent Robert Lang to Montreal in exchange for this pick.
5. Columbus' acquired first-round pick went to Anaheim as the result of a trade on June 26, 2009, that sent a first-round pick (#21 overall) in the 2009 entry draft to Columbus in exchange for a second-round pick in the 2009 entry draft and this pick.
  Columbus previously acquired this pick as the result of a trade on June 26, 2009, that sent a first-round pick (#16 overall) and a third-round pick (#77 overall) in the 2009 entry draft to the Islanders in exchange for a second-round pick, a third-round pick (#62 overall) and a fourth-round pick in the 2009 entry draft along with this pick.
  The Islanders previously acquired this pick as the result of a trade on February 20, 2009, that sent Mike Comrie and Chris Campoli to Ottawa in exchange for Dean McAmmond and this pick.
  Ottawa previously acquired this pick as the result of a trade on August 29, 2008, that sent Andrej Meszaros to Tampa Bay in exchange for Filip Kuba, Alexandre Picard and this pick.
6. San Jose's acquired second-round pick went to Carolina as the result of a trade on February 7, 2010, that sent Niclas Wallin and a fifth-round pick in the 2010 entry draft to San Jose in exchange for this pick.
7. Buffalo's acquired second-round pick went to Columbus as the result of a trade on March 3, 2010, that sent Raffi Torres to Buffalo in exchange for Nathan Paetsch and this pick.
8. Pittsburgh re-acquired their original fifth-round pick from the Rangers as the result of a trade on June 27, 2009, that sent Chad Johnson to the Rangers in exchange for this pick.
9. The condition of this pick was if Lindstrom appeared in more than 40 regular season or 15 playoff games with Anaheim or another team during the 2008–09 season, Columbus would receive a fourth-round pick. Columbus would receive a seventh-round pick if less. The conditions was converted on April 1, 2009.

=== August ===
August 29, 2008	To Tampa Bay Lightning Andrej Meszaros	To Ottawa Senators Filip Kuba; Alexandre Picard; 1st-round pick in 2009 (ANA - #26 - Kyle Palmieri)^{1}

1. Columbus' acquired first-round pick went to Anaheim as the result of a trade on June 26, 2009, that sent a first-round pick (#21 overall) in the 2009 entry draft to Columbus in exchange for a second-round pick in the 2009 entry draft and this pick.
  Columbus previously acquired this pick as the result of a trade on June 26, 2009, that sent a first-round pick (#16 overall) and a third-round pick (#77 overall) in the 2009 entry draft to the Islanders in exchange for a second-round pick, a third-round pick (#62 overall) and a fourth-round pick in the 2009 entry draft along with this pick.
  The Islanders previously acquired this pick as the result of a trade on February 20, 2009, that sent Mike Comrie and Chris Campoli to Ottawa in exchange for Dean McAmmond and this pick.

=== September ===
September 2, 2008	To Ottawa Senators Ryan Shannon	To Vancouver Canucks Lawrence Nycholat
September 2, 2008	To Toronto Maple Leafs Mike Van Ryn	To Florida Panthers Bryan McCabe; 4th-round pick in 2010 (#92 - Sam Brittain)
September 12, 2008	To Phoenix Coyotes Sean Zimmerman	To New Jersey Devils Kevin Cormier
September 12, 2008	To Montreal Canadiens Robert Lang	To Chicago Blackhawks 2nd-round pick in 2010 (BOS - #32 - Jared Knight)^{1}
September 26, 2008	To Atlanta Thrashers Mathieu Schneider	To Anaheim Ducks Ken Klee; Brad Larsen; Chad Painchaud
September 29, 2008	To Nashville Predators Nick Tarnasky	To Tampa Bay Lightning conditional pick in 2009^{2} (6th-round - #162 - Jaroslav Janus)
September 30, 2008	To Los Angeles Kings Sean O'Donnell	To Anaheim Ducks conditional 3rd-round pick in 2009^{3}

1. Toronto's second-round pick went to Boston as the result of a trade on September 18, 2009, that sent Phil Kessel to Toronto in exchange for first-round picks in the 2010 entry draft and the 2011 entry draft along with this pick.
  Toronto re-acquired its original pick as the result of a trade on September 5, 2009, that sent a second-round pick and a third-round pick in the 2011 entry draft to Chicago in exchange for this pick.
2. The conditions of this pick were Tampa Bay receives a fifth-round pick if Tarnasky plays more than 55 games Nashville in the 2008–09 NHL season or a sixth-round pick if less than 55 games. The condition of the sixth-round pick was met on November 27, 2008, when Tarnasky was traded to the Florida Panthers.
3. The condition of this pick was Anaheim would receive this pick if Los Angeles trades O'Donnell before the 2009 trade deadline. The condition was not met as O'Donnell finish the season with Los Angeles.

=== October ===
October 1, 2008	To Tampa Bay Lightning Michal Sersen	To Pittsburgh Penguins 5th-round pick in 2009 (#123 - Alex Velischek)
October 6, 2008	To Tampa Bay Lightning Lukas Krajicek; Juraj Simek	To Vancouver Canucks Shane O'Brien; Michel Ouellet
October 8, 2008	To Dallas Stars Doug Janik	To Chicago Blackhawks conditional 7th-round pick in 2010 (#191 - Macmillian Carruth)^{1}
October 9, 2008	To Pittsburgh Penguins Michael Zigomanis	To Phoenix Coyotes future considerations
October 13, 2008	To Philadelphia Flyers Andrew Alberts	To Boston Bruins Ned Lukacevic conditional pick in 2009 (4th-round - #112 - Lane MacDermid)^{2}
October 30, 2008	To Nashville Predators Hugh Jessiman	To New York Rangers future considerations
October 30, 2008	To Nashville Predators Tim Ramholt	To Philadelphia Flyers Josh Gratton

1. The conditions of this pick are unknown.
2. The conditions of this pick were if Philadelphia re-signs Alberts after the end of the 2008–09 NHL season but prior to the 2009 entry draft, Boston would receive a third-round pick in the 2009 entry draft. If Philadelphia does not re-sign Alberts Boston would receive a fourth-round pick in the 2009 entry draft. Alberts did not re-sign with Philadelphia so Boston received the fourth-round pick.

=== November ===
November 3, 2008	To Ottawa Senators Drew Fata	To Phoenix Coyotes Alexander Nikulin
November 7, 2008	To Philadelphia Flyers Matt Carle; 3rd-round pick in 2009 (#87 - Simon Bertilsson)	To Tampa Bay Lightning Steve Downie; Steve Eminger; 4th-round pick in 2009 (#93 - Alex Hutchings)
November 16, 2008	To Dallas Stars Darryl Sydor	To Pittsburgh Penguins Philippe Boucher
November 24, 2008	To St. Louis Blues Carlo Colaiacovo; Alexander Steen	To Toronto Maple Leafs Lee Stempniak
November 25, 2008	To Phoenix Coyotes Wyatt Smith	To Tampa Bay Lightning future considerations
November 27, 2008	To Nashville Predators Wade Belak	To Florida Panthers Nick Tarnasky
November 30, 2008	To Dallas Stars Andrew Hutchinson	To Tampa Bay Lightning rights to Lauri Tukonen

=== December ===
December 3, 2008	To Anaheim Ducks Logan Stephenson	To Phoenix Coyotes Joakim Lindstrom
December 9, 2008	To Chicago Blackhawks Jim Sharrow	To Vancouver Canucks future considerations
December 14, 2008	To Dallas Stars Brian Sutherby	To Anaheim Ducks rights to David McIntyre conditional 6th-round pick in 2010 (#161 - Andreas Dahlstrom)^{1}
December 19, 2008	To St. Louis Blues Jonathan Filewich	To Pittsburgh Penguins conditional 6th-round pick in 2010^{2}
December 30, 2008	To Vancouver Canucks Jason LaBarbera	To Los Angeles Kings 7th-round pick in 2009 (ATL - #203 - Jordan Samuels-Thomas)^{3}

1. The condition of this pick was if Dallas re-signs Sutherby. The condition was met when Dallas re-signed Sutherby on March 9, 2009.
2. The conditions of this pick are unknown. No selections was made from this trade.
3. Los Angeles' acquired seventh-round pick went to Atlanta as the result of a trade on June 27, 2009, that sent a fourth-round pick (#95 overall) in the 2009 entry draft to Los Angeles in exchange for two fourth-round picks (#117 & 119 overall) in the 2009 entry draft and this pick.

=== January ===
January 5, 2009	To Montreal Canadiens T.J. Kemp	To Pittsburgh Penguins conditional 7th-round pick in 2010^{1}
January 7, 2009	To Toronto Maple Leafs Brad May	To Anaheim Ducks conditional 6th-round pick in 2010^{2}
January 10, 2009	To Chicago Blackhawks Adam Pineault	To Columbus Blue Jackets Michael Blunden
January 13, 2009	To Atlanta Thrashers Brett Skinner	To New York Islanders Junior Lessard
January 14, 2009	To Columbus Blue Jackets Jason Williams	To Atlanta Thrashers Clay Wilson; 6th-round pick in 2009 (#177 - David Pacan)^{3}
January 17, 2009	To Pittsburgh Penguins Mathieu Garon	To Edmonton Oilers Dany Sabourin; Ryan Stone; 4th-round pick in 2011 (#114 - Tobias Rieder)
January 21, 2009	To Toronto Maple Leafs Ryan Hamilton	To Minnesota Wild Robbie Earl
January 29, 2009	To Minnesota Wild Dan Fritsche	To New York Rangers Erik Reitz

1. The conditions of this pick are unknown. No selections was made from this trade.
2. The condition of this pick was if Toronto re-signs May. The condition was not met when May signed with Detroit on October 8, 2009. No selections was made from this trade.
3. Atlanta's acquired sixth-round pick went to Chicago as the result of a trade on June 27, 2009, that sent a fifth-round pick in the 2010 entry draft to Atlanta in exchange for this pick.

=== February ===
February 3, 2009	To New Jersey Devils David McIntyre	To Anaheim Ducks Sheldon Brookbank
February 4, 2009	To Vancouver Canucks Nathan McIver	To Anaheim Ducks Mike Brown
February 7, 2009	To Carolina Hurricanes Jussi Jokinen	To Tampa Bay Lightning Wade Brookbank; Josef Melichar; 4th-round pick in 2009^{1}
February 16, 2009	To Montreal Canadiens Mathieu Schneider conditional pick in 2009^{2} (3rd-round - #65 - Joonas Nattinen)	To Atlanta Thrashers 2nd-round pick in 2009 (#45 - Jeremy Morin); 3rd-round pick in 2010 (#87 - Julian Melchiori)
February 20, 2009	To Ottawa Senators Mike Comrie; Chris Campoli	To New York Islanders Dean McAmmond; 1st-round pick in 2009 (ANA - #26 - Kyle Palmieri)^{3}
February 26, 2009	To Dallas Stars Steve Begin	To Montreal Canadiens Doug Janik
February 26, 2009	To Anaheim Ducks Ryan Whitney	To Pittsburgh Penguins Chris Kunitz; Eric Tangradi

1. Toronto's acquired fourth-round pick was forfeited as punishment for the violation of Jonas Frogren's contract, under the NHL Collective Bargaining Agreement.
  Toronto previously acquired this pick as the result of a trade on March 4, 2009, that sent Richard Petiot to Tampa Bay in exchange for Olaf Kolzig, Andy Rogers, Jamie Heward and this pick.
2. The conditions of this pick was Montreal would receive a third-round pick if Montreal failed to reach the second round of the 2009 Stanley Cup playoffs or a fourth-round pick if Montreal reaches the second round of the 2009 Stanley Cup playoffs or a fifth-round pick if Montreal reaches the third round or further of the 2009 Stanley Cup playoffs. The condition of a third-round pick was converted on April 22, 2009, when Montreal were eliminated in the first round of the 2009 Stanley Cup playoffs.
3. Columbus' acquired first-round pick went to Anaheim as the result of a trade on June 26, 2009, that sent a first-round pick (#21 overall) in the 2009 entry draft to Columbus in exchange for a second-round pick in the 2009 entry draft and this pick.
  Columbus previously acquired this pick as the result of a trade on June 26, 2009, that sent a first-round pick (#16 overall) and a third-round pick (#77 overall) in the 2009 entry draft to the Islanders in exchange for a second-round pick, a third-round pick (#62 overall) and a fourth-round pick in the 2009 entry draft along with this pick.

=== March ===
March 2, 2009	To Atlanta Thrashers Anssi Salmela	To New Jersey Devils Niclas Havelid; Myles Stoesz
March 4, 2009	To Philadelphia Flyers Kyle McLaren	To San Jose Sharks 6th-round pick in 2009^{1}
March 4, 2009	To Anaheim Ducks Erik Christensen	To Atlanta Thrashers Eric O'Dell
March 4, 2009	To San Jose Sharks Travis Moen; Kent Huskins conditional 4th-round pick in 2011^{2}	To Anaheim Ducks rights to Nick Bonino; Timo Pielmeier conditional 2nd-round pick in 2009^{3} 4th-round pick in 2012^{4} (#108 - Andrew O'Brien)
March 4, 2009	To Columbus Blue Jackets Antoine Vermette	To Ottawa Senators Pascal Leclaire; 2nd-round pick in 2009 (#46 - Robin Lehner)
March 4, 2009	To Buffalo Sabres Mikael Tellqvist	To Phoenix Coyotes 4th-round pick in 2010 (MTL - #113 - Mark MacMillan)^{5}
March 4, 2009	To Los Angeles Kings Justin Williams	To Carolina Hurricanes Patrick O'Sullivan; 2nd-round pick in 2009 (#51 - Brian Dumoulin)
March 4, 2009	To Carolina Hurricanes Erik Cole; 5th-round pick in 2009 (#131 - Matt Kennedy)	To Edmonton Oilers Patrick O'Sullivan; 2nd-round pick in 2009 (TOR - #58 - Jesse Blacker)^{6}
March 4, 2009	To Edmonton Oilers Ales Kotalik	To Buffalo Sabres 2nd-round pick in 2009 (TOR - #58 - Jesse Blacker)^{7}
March 4, 2009	To Buffalo Sabres Dominic Moore	To Toronto Maple Leafs 2nd-round pick in 2009 (#58 - Jesse Blacker)
March 4, 2009	To New York Rangers Derek Morris	To Phoenix Coyotes Dmitri Kalinin; Nigel Dawes; Petr Prucha
March 4, 2009	To New York Rangers Nik Antropov	To Toronto Maple Leafs 2nd-round pick in 2009 (#50 - Kenny Ryan) conditional 4th-round pick in 2010^{8}
March 4, 2009	To Pittsburgh Penguins Andy Wozniewski	To St. Louis Blues Danny Richmond
March 4, 2009	To Pittsburgh Penguins Bill Guerin	To New York Islanders conditional pick in 2009^{9} (PHX - 3rd-round - #91 - Mike Lee)^{10}
March 4, 2009	To Florida Panthers Steve Eminger	To Tampa Bay Lightning Noah Welch; 3rd-round pick in 2009 (DET - #75 - Andrej Nestrasil)^{11}
March 4, 2009	To Tampa Bay Lightning Richard Petiot	To Toronto Maple Leafs Olaf Kolzig; Andy Rogers; Jamie Heward; 4th-round pick in 2009^{12}
March 4, 2009	To Boston Bruins Mark Recchi; 2nd-round pick in 2010 (FLA - #36 - Alexander Petrovic)^{13}	To Tampa Bay Lightning Matt Lashoff; Martins Karsums
March 4, 2009	To Philadelphia Flyers Daniel Carcillo	To Phoenix Coyotes Scottie Upshall; 2nd-round pick in 2011 (#56 - Lucas Lessio)
March 4, 2009	To Calgary Flames Jordan Leopold	To Colorado Avalanche Lawrence Nycholat; Ryan Wilson; 2nd-round pick in 2009 (#49 - Stefan Elliott)
March 4, 2009	To Columbus Blue Jackets Kevin Lalande	To Calgary Flames 4th-round pick in 2009 (FLA - #107 - Garrett Wilson)^{14}
March 4, 2009	To Calgary Flames Olli Jokinen; 3rd-round pick in 2009 (FLA - #67 - Josh Birkholz)^{15}	To Phoenix Coyotes Matthew Lombardi; Brandon Prust; Calgary's option of 1st-round pick in 2009 or 2010 entry draft (#13 - Brandon Gormley)
March 4, 2009	To Anaheim Ducks James Wisniewski; Logan Stephenson	To Chicago Blackhawks Samuel Pahlsson; Petri Kontiola future considerations
March 4, 2009	To Boston Bruins Steve Montador	To Anaheim Ducks Petteri Nokelainen

1. Trade nullified on March 9, 2009, after McLaren failed his physical.
2. The conditions were San Jose would receive this pick if Anaheim signs either Huskins or Moen as free agents after the 2008-09 NHL season. The condition was not met when Huskins re-signed with San Jose on July 1, 2009, and Moen signed with Montreal on July 9, 2009. No selections was made from this trade.
3. The condition was that Anaheim would receive this pick if San Jose reached the 2009 Stanley Cup Finals. The condition was not met when San Jose were eliminated on April 27, 2009, in the first round of the 2009 Stanley Cup playoffs.
4. The conditions were Anaheim would receive this pick if San Jose re-signs either Huskins or Moen as free agents after the 2008-09 NHL season. The condition was met when Huskins re-signed with San Jose on July 1, 2009.
5. Phoenix's acquired fourth-round pick went to Montreal as the result of a trade on June 25, 2010, that sent a first-round pick (27th overall) and a second-round pick in the 2010 entry draft to Phoenix in exchange for a first-round pick (22nd overall) in the 2010 entry draft and this pick.
6. Buffalo's acquired second-round pick went to Toronto as the result of a trade on March 4, 2009, that sent Dominic Moore to Buffalo in exchange for this pick.
  Buffalo previously acquired this pick as the result of a trade on March 4, 2009, that sent Ales Kotalik to Edmonton in exchange for this pick.
7. Buffalo's acquired second-round pick went to Toronto as the result of a trade on March 4, 2009, that sent Dominic Moore to Buffalo in exchange for this pick.
8. The condition was that Toronto would receive this pick if the Rangers reached the second round of the 2009 Stanley Cup playoffs. The condition was not met when the Rangers were eliminated on April 28, 2009, in the first round of the 2009 Stanley Cup playoffs.
9. The conditions of this pick was the Islanders would receive a third-round pick if Pittsburgh advance to the second round of the 2009 Stanley Cup playoffs or a fourth-round pick if Pittsburgh qualified for the 2009 Stanley Cup playoffs or a fifth-round pick if Pittsburgh missed the 2009 Stanley Cup playoffs. The condition of a third-round pick was converted on April 25, 2009, when Pittsburgh advanced to the second round of the 2009 Stanley Cup playoffs.
10. The Islanders' acquired third-round pick went to Phoenix as the result of a trade on June 27, 2009, that sent a third-round pick in the 2010 entry draft to the Islanders in exchange for this pick.
11. Tampa Bay's acquired third-round pick went to Detroit as the result of a trade on June 26, 2009, that sent a first-round pick in the 2009 entry draft to Tampa Bay in exchange for a second-round pick in the 2009 entry draft and this pick.
12. Toronto's acquired fourth-round pick was forfeited as punishment for the violation of Jonas Frogren's contract, under the NHL Collective Bargaining Agreement.
13. Boston's acquired second-round pick went to Florida as the result of a trade on March 3, 2010, that sent Dennis Seidenberg and Matt Bartkowski to Boston in exchange for Craig Weller, Byron Bitz and this pick.
14. Los Angeles' acquired fourth-round pick went to Florida as the result of a trade on June 27, 2009, that sent a third-round pick in the 2010 entry draft to Los Angeles in exchange for a fifth-round pick in the 2009 entry draft and this pick.
  Los Angeles previously acquired this pick as the result of a trade on June 27, 2009, that sent a third-round pick (#74 overall) in the 2009 entry draft to Calgary in exchange for a third-round pick (#84 overall) in the 2009 entry draft and this pick.
15. The Calgary's third-round pick went to Florida as the result of a trade on June 27, 2009, that sent Jay Bouwmeester to Calgary in exchange for Jordan Leopold and this pick.

=== June ===
The 2009 NHL entry draft was held on June 26–27, 2009.

June 26, 2009	To New York Islanders 1st-round pick in 2009 (MIN - #16 - Nick Leddy)^{1} 3rd-round pick in 2009 (MIN - #77 - Matt Hackett)^{3}	To Columbus Blue Jackets 1st-round pick in 2009 (ANA - #26 - Kyle Palmieri)^{2} 2nd-round pick in 2009 (ANA - #37 - Mat Clark)^{4} 3rd-round pick in 2009 (NYI - #62 - Anders Nilsson)^{5} 4th-round pick in 2009 (NYI - #92 - Casey Cizikas)^{6}
June 26, 2009	To New York Islanders 1st-round pick in 2009 (#12 - Calvin de Haan)	To Minnesota Wild 1st-round pick in 2009 (#16 - Nick Leddy); 3rd-round pick in 2009 (#77 - Matt Hackett); 7th-round pick in 2009 (#182 - Erik Haula)
June 26, 2009	To New Jersey Devils 1st-round pick in 2009 (#20 - Jacob Josefson)	To Calgary Flames 1st-round pick in 2009 (#23 - Tim Erixon); 3rd-round pick in 2009 (LAK - #84 - Nicolas Deslauriers)^{7}
June 26, 2009	To Philadelphia Flyers Chris Pronger; Ryan Dingle	To Anaheim Ducks Joffrey Lupul; Luca Sbisa; 1st-round pick in 2009 (CBJ - #21 - John Moore)^{8} 1st-round pick in 2010 (#29 - Emerson Etem) conditional 3rd-round pick in 2010 or 2011^{9}
June 26, 2009	To Columbus Blue Jackets 1st-round pick in 2009 (#21 - John Moore)	To Anaheim Ducks 1st-round pick in 2009 (#26 - Kyle Palmieri); 2nd-round pick in 2009 (#37 - Mat Clark)
June 26, 2009	To Tampa Bay Lightning 1st-round pick in 2009 (#29 - Carter Ashton)	To Detroit Red Wings 2nd-round pick in 2009 (#32 - Landon Ferraro); 3rd-round pick in 2009 (#75 - Andrej Nestrasil)
June 27, 2009	To Phoenix Coyotes Stefan Meyer	To Florida Panthers rights to Steven Reinprecht
June 27, 2009	To Columbus Blue Jackets 2nd-round pick in 2009 (#56 - Kevin Lynch)	To New York Islanders 3rd-round pick in 2009 (#62 - Anders Nilsson); 4th-round pick in 2009 (#92 - Casey Cizikas)
June 27, 2009	To Phoenix Coyotes Jim Vandermeer	To Calgary Flames Brandon Prust
June 27, 2009	To Calgary Flames rights to Jay Bouwmeester	To Florida Panthers rights to Jordan Leopold; 3rd-round pick in 2009 (#67 - Josh Birkholz)
June 27, 2009	To Calgary Flames 3rd-round pick in 2009 (#74 - Ryan Howse)	To Los Angeles Kings 3rd-round pick in 2009 (#84 - Nicolas Deslauriers); 4th-round pick in 2009 (FLA - #107 - Garrett Wilson)^{1}
June 27, 2009	To Phoenix Coyotes 3rd-round pick in 2009 (#91 - Mike Lee)	To New York Islanders 3rd-round pick in 2010 (#82 - Jason Clark)
June 27, 2009	To New York Rangers Brian Boyle	To Los Angeles Kings 3rd-round pick in 2010 (#70 - Jordan Weal)
June 27, 2009	To Los Angeles Kings 4th-round pick in 2009 (#95 - Jean-Francois Berube)	To Atlanta Thrashers 4th-round pick in 2009 (#117 - Edward Pasquale); 4th-round pick in 2009 (#120 - Ben Chiarot); 7th-round pick in 2009 (#203 - Jordan Samuels-Thomas)
June 27, 2009	To Minnesota Wild rights to Kyle Brodziak; 6th-round pick in 2009 (#161 - Darcy Kuemper)	To Edmonton Oilers 4th-round pick in 2009 (#99 - Kyle Bigos); 5th-round pick in 2009 (#133 - Olivier Roy)
June 27, 2009	To Los Angeles Kings 3rd-round pick in 2010 (TBL - #63 - Brock Beukeboom)^{2}	To Florida Panthers 4th-round pick in 2009 (#107 - Garrett Wilson); 5th-round pick in 2009 (#138 - Wade Megan)
June 27, 2009	To Tampa Bay Lightning 5th-round pick in 2009 (#148 - Michael Zador)	To Nashville Predators 5th-round pick in 2010 (#126 - Patrick Cehlin)
June 27, 2009	To New York Rangers Chad Johnson	To Pittsburgh Penguins 5th-round pick in 2009 (#151 - Andy Bathgate)
June 27, 2009	To Phoenix Coyotes Sami Lepisto	To Washington Capitals 5th-round pick in 2010 (#142 - Caleb Herbert)
June 27, 2009	To Chicago Blackhawks 6th-round pick in 2009 (#177 - David Pacan)	To Atlanta Thrashers 5th-round pick in 2010 (#150 - Yasin Cisse)
June 27, 2009	To Phoenix Coyotes rights to Shaun Heshka	To Vancouver Canucks 7th-round pick in 2009 (#187 - Steven Anthony)
June 27, 2009	To San Jose Sharks 7th-round pick in 2009 (#189 - Marek Viedensky)	To Dallas Stars 6th-round pick in 2010 (OTT - #178 - Mark Stone)^{3}
June 27, 2009	To Ottawa Senators 7th-round pick in 2009 (#191 - Michael Sdao)	To Edmonton Oilers 6th-round pick in 2010 (#166 - Drew Czerwonka)
June 27, 2009	To St. Louis Blues 7th-round pick in 2009 (#202 - Maxwell Tardy)	To Nashville Predators 7th-round pick in 2010 (#194 - David Elsner)
June 27, 2009	To Montreal Canadiens 7th-round pick in 2009 (#211 - Petteri Simila)	To Pittsburgh Penguins 6th-round pick in 2010 (ANA - #177 - Kevin Lind)^{4}
June 30, 2009	To Montreal Canadiens Scott Gomez; Tom Pyatt; Michael Busto	To New York Rangers Chris Higgins; Doug Janik; Ryan McDonagh; Pavel Valentenko
June 30, 2009	To New York Islanders rights to Tony Romano	To New Jersey Devils Ben Walter future considerations

1. The Islanders' acquired first-round pick went to Minnesota as the result of a trade on June 26, 2009, that sent a first-round pick (#12 overall) in the 2009 entry draft to the Islanders in exchange for a third-round pick and a seventh-round pick in the 2009 entry draft along with this pick.
2. Columbus' acquired first-round pick went to Anaheim as the result of a trade on June 26, 2009, that sent a first-round pick (#21 overall) in the 2009 entry draft to Columbus in exchange for a second-round pick in the 2009 entry draft and this pick.
3. The Islanders' acquired third-round pick went to Minnesota as the result of a trade on June 26, 2009, that sent a first-round pick (#12 overall) in the 2009 entry draft to the Islanders in exchange for a first-round pick (#16 overall) and a seventh-round pick in the 2009 entry draft along this pick.
4. Columbus' acquired second-round pick went to Anaheim as the result of a trade on June 26, 2009, that sent a first-round pick (#21 overall) in the 2009 entry draft to Columbus in exchange for a first-round pick (#26 overall) in the 2009 entry draft and this pick.
5. The Islanders' third-round pick was re-acquired as the result of a trade on June 27, 2009, that sent a second-round pick in the 2009 entry draft to Columbus in exchange for a fourth-round pick in the 2009 entry draft and this pick.
6. The Islanders' fourth-round pick was re-acquired as the result of a trade on June 27, 2009, that sent a second-round pick in the 2009 entry draft to Columbus in exchange for a third-round pick in the 2009 entry draft and this pick.
7. Calgary's acquired third-round pick went to Los Angeles as the result of a trade on June 27, 2009, that sent a third-round pick (#74 overall) in the 2009 entry draft to Calgary in exchange for a fourth-round pick in the 2009 entry draft and this pick.
8. Anaheim's acquired first-round pick went to Columbus as the result of a trade on June 26, 2009, that sent a first-round pick (#26 overall) and a second-round pick in the 2009 entry draft to Anaheim in exchange for this pick.
9. The conditions of this pick are that Anaheim would receive a choice of a third-round pick in either 2010 entry draft or 2011 if Philadelphia wins the 2010 Stanley Cup Finals. The conditions were not met when Philadelphia lost in the finals on June 9, 2010, against Chicago.
10. Los Angeles' acquired fourth-round pick went to Florida as the result of a trade on June 27, 2009, that sent a third-round pick in the 2010 entry draft to Los Angeles in exchange for a fifth-round pick in the 2009 entry draft and this pick.
11. Los Angeles' acquired third-round pick went to Tampa Bay as the result of a trade on March 3, 2010, that sent Jeff Halpern to Los Angeles in exchange for Teddy Purcell and this pick.
12. Dallas' acquired sixth-round pick went to Ottawa as the result of a trade on July 8, 2009, that sent Alex Auld to Dallas in exchange for this pick.
13. Pittsburgh's acquired sixth-round pick went to Anaheim as the result of a trade on May 28, 2010, that sent Mattias Modig to Pittsburgh in exchange for this pick.

== Waivers ==
Once an NHL player has played in a certain number of games or a set number of seasons has passed since the signing of his first NHL contract (see here), that player must be offered to all of the other NHL teams before he can be assigned to a minor league affiliate.

Date	Player	New team	Previous team
June 25, 2008	Kyle Wellwood	Vancouver Canucks	Toronto Maple Leafs
September 29, 2008	Thomas Pock	New York Islanders	New York Rangers
September 30, 2008	Steve MacIntyre	Edmonton Oilers	Florida Panthers
October 1, 2008	Matt Ellis	Buffalo Sabres	Los Angeles Kings
October 2, 2008	Doug Janik	Dallas Stars	Chicago Blackhawks
October 3, 2008	Joakim Lindstrom	Chicago Blackhawks	Anaheim Ducks
October 4, 2008	Nathan McIver	Anaheim Ducks	Vancouver Canucks
October 7, 2008	Joakim Lindstrom	Anaheim Ducks	Chicago Blackhawks
October 8, 2008	Nate Thompson	New York Islanders	Boston Bruins
October 8, 2008	Doug Janik	Chicago Blackhawks	Dallas Stars
October 13, 2008	Kyle Quincey	Los Angeles Kings	Detroit Red Wings
October 21, 2008	David Koci	St. Louis Blues	Tampa Bay Lightning
October 21, 2008	Matt Pettinger	Tampa Bay Lightning	Vancouver Canucks
October 28, 2008	Ken Klee	Phoenix Coyotes	Anaheim Ducks
November 11, 2008	Jesse Boulerice	Edmonton Oilers	Colorado Avalanche
November 18, 2008	B.J. Crombeen	St. Louis Blues	Dallas Stars
November 20, 2008	David Koci	Tampa Bay Lightning	St. Louis Blues
January 10, 2009	Rich Peverley	Atlanta Thrashers	Nashville Predators
January 17, 2009	Wade Dubielewicz	Columbus Blue Jackets	New York Islanders
January 19, 2009	Cory Murphy	Tampa Bay Lightning	Florida Panthers
February 6, 2009	Staffan Kronwall	Washington Capitals	Toronto Maple Leafs
February 21, 2009	Chris Gratton	Columbus Blue Jackets	Tampa Bay Lightning
February 25, 2009	Mark Bell	New York Rangers	Toronto Maple Leafs
February 27, 2009	Glen Metropolit	Montreal Canadiens	Philadelphia Flyers
February 27, 2009	Ossi Vaananen	Vancouver Canucks	Philadelphia Flyers
March 3, 2009	Lawrence Nycholat	Calgary Flames	Vancouver Canucks
March 3, 2009	Sean Avery	New York Rangers	Dallas Stars
March 4, 2009	Erik Reitz	Toronto Maple Leafs	New York Rangers
March 4, 2009	Martin Gerber	Toronto Maple Leafs	Ottawa Senators
March 4, 2009	Brendan Morrison	Dallas Stars	Anaheim Ducks
March 4, 2009	Craig Adams	Pittsburgh Penguins	Chicago Blackhawks

== See also ==
- 2008 NHL entry draft
- 2008 in sports
- 2009 in sports
- 2007–08 NHL transactions
- 2009–10 NHL transactions
