= 2009 NHL entry draft =

2009 North American ice hockey draft

General information
- Date: June 26–27, 2009
- Location: Bell Centre; Montreal, Quebec, Canada

Overview
- 211 total selections in 7 rounds
- First selection: (Canada) John Tavares (New York Islanders)

The 2009 NHL entry draft was the 47th draft for the National Hockey League. It was held on June 26–27, 2009, at the Bell Centre in Montreal. The draft was part of the centennial celebrations of the Montreal Canadiens. NHL teams took turns selecting amateur ice hockey players from junior, collegiate, or European leagues. The New York Islanders, who finished last overall in the 2008–09 NHL season, retained the first overall selection following that year's NHL draft lottery.

The Islanders used the first overall pick to select centre John Tavares from the London Knights of the Ontario Hockey League (OHL). The Tampa Bay Lightning used the second pick to draft defenceman Victor Hedman from Modo Hockey of the Eliteserien, and the Colorado Avalanche drafted Matt Duchene of the Brampton Battalion with the third overall pick. Seven players from Sweden were selected in the first round, an all-time record for the country.

As of 2026, there are 24 active NHL players from this draft.

== Top prospects ==
Source: NHL Central Scouting Bureau Final Rankings.

Ranking	North American skaters	European skaters
1	(Canada) John Tavares (C)	(Sweden) Victor Hedman (D)
2	(Canada) Matt Duchene (C)	(Sweden) Magnus Paajarvi-Svensson (LW)
3	(Canada) Evander Kane (LW)	(Sweden) Jacob Josefson (C)
4	(Canada) Brayden Schenn (C)	(Sweden) Oliver Ekman-Larsson (D)
5	(United States) Jordan Schroeder (C)	(Sweden) Tim Erixon (D)
6	(United States) John Moore (D)	(Sweden) David Rundblad (D)
7	(Canada) Scott Glennie (RW)	(Sweden) Carl Klingberg (RW)
8	(Canada) Simon Despres (D)	(Sweden) Marcus Johansson (C)
9	(Canada) Jared Cowen (D)	(Russia) Dmitry Orlov (D)
10	(Canada) Zack Kassian (RW)	(Finland) Joonas Nattinen (C)

Ranking	North American goalies	European goalies
1	(Canada) Matt Hackett	(Sweden) Robin Lehner
2	(Canada) Olivier Roy	(Finland) Mikko Koskinen
3	(Canada) Edward Pasquale	(Slovakia) Juraj Holly

== Selections by round ==
= NHL All-Star team ·	= NHL All-Star (Note: Players are identified as an All-Star if they were selected for the All-Star game at any time in their career.) ·	= NHL All-Star and NHL All-Star team ·

=== Round one ===
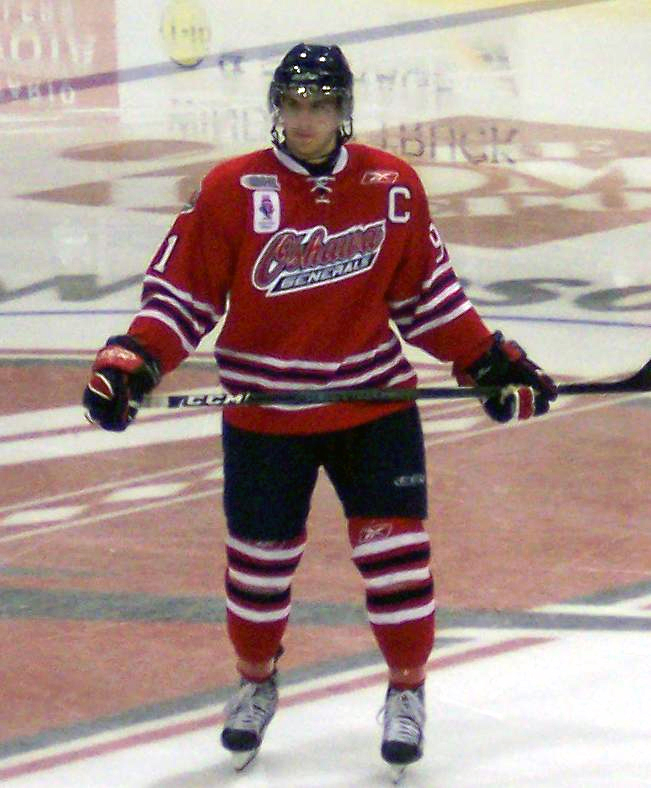
John Tavares was selected first overall by the New York Islanders.

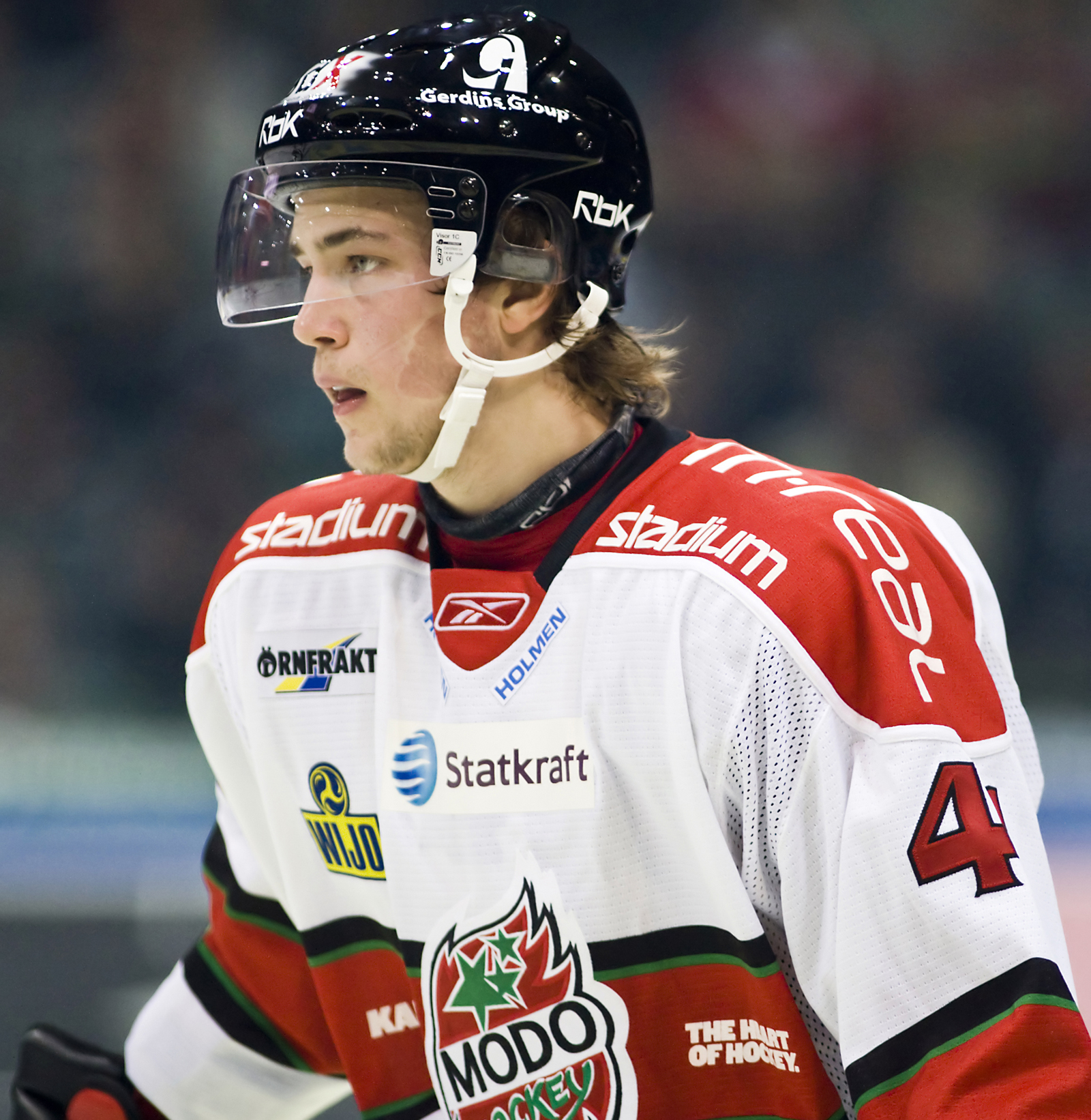
Victor Hedman was selected second overall by the Tampa Bay Lightning.

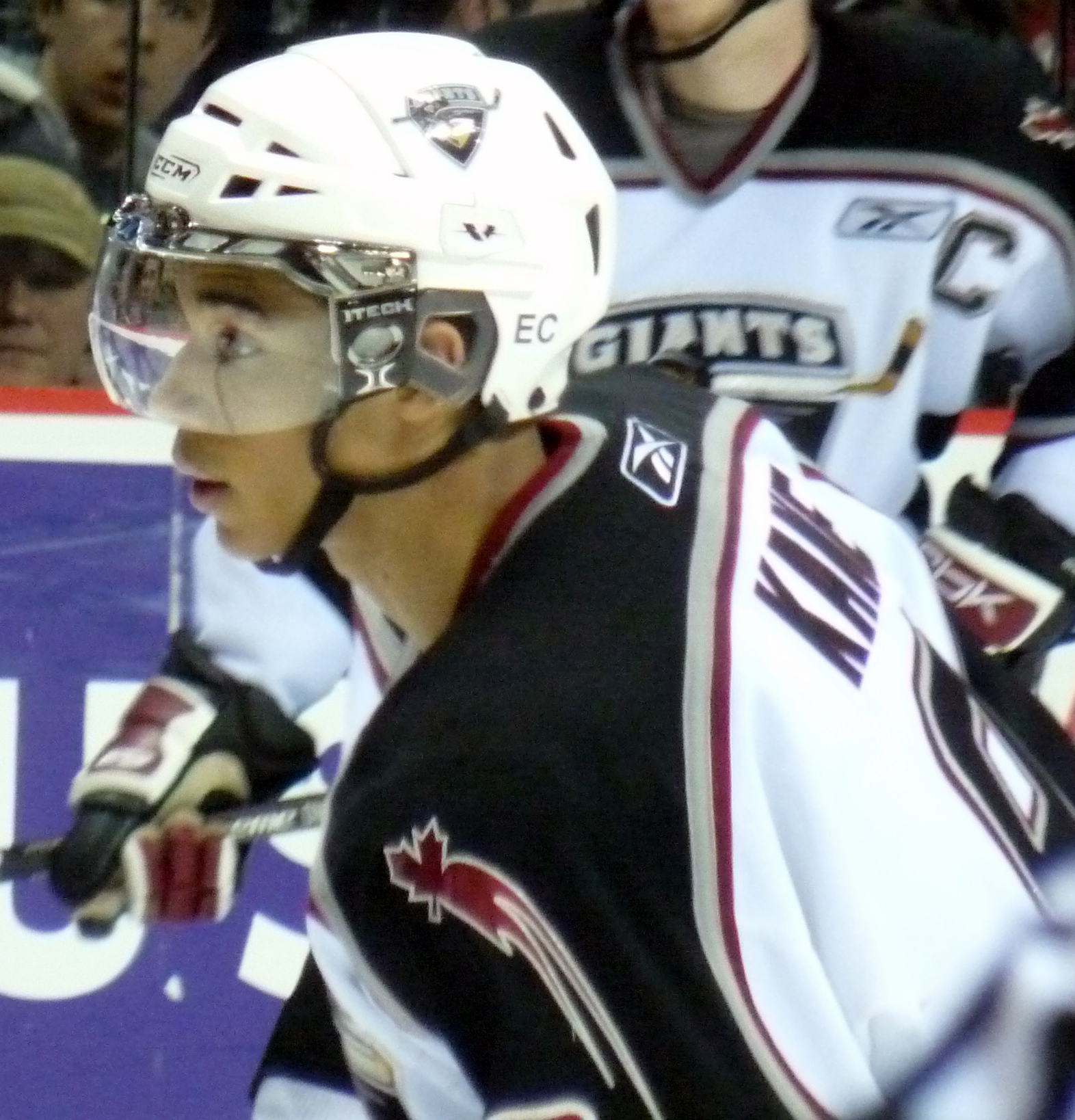
Evander Kane was selected fourth overall by the Atlanta Thrashers.

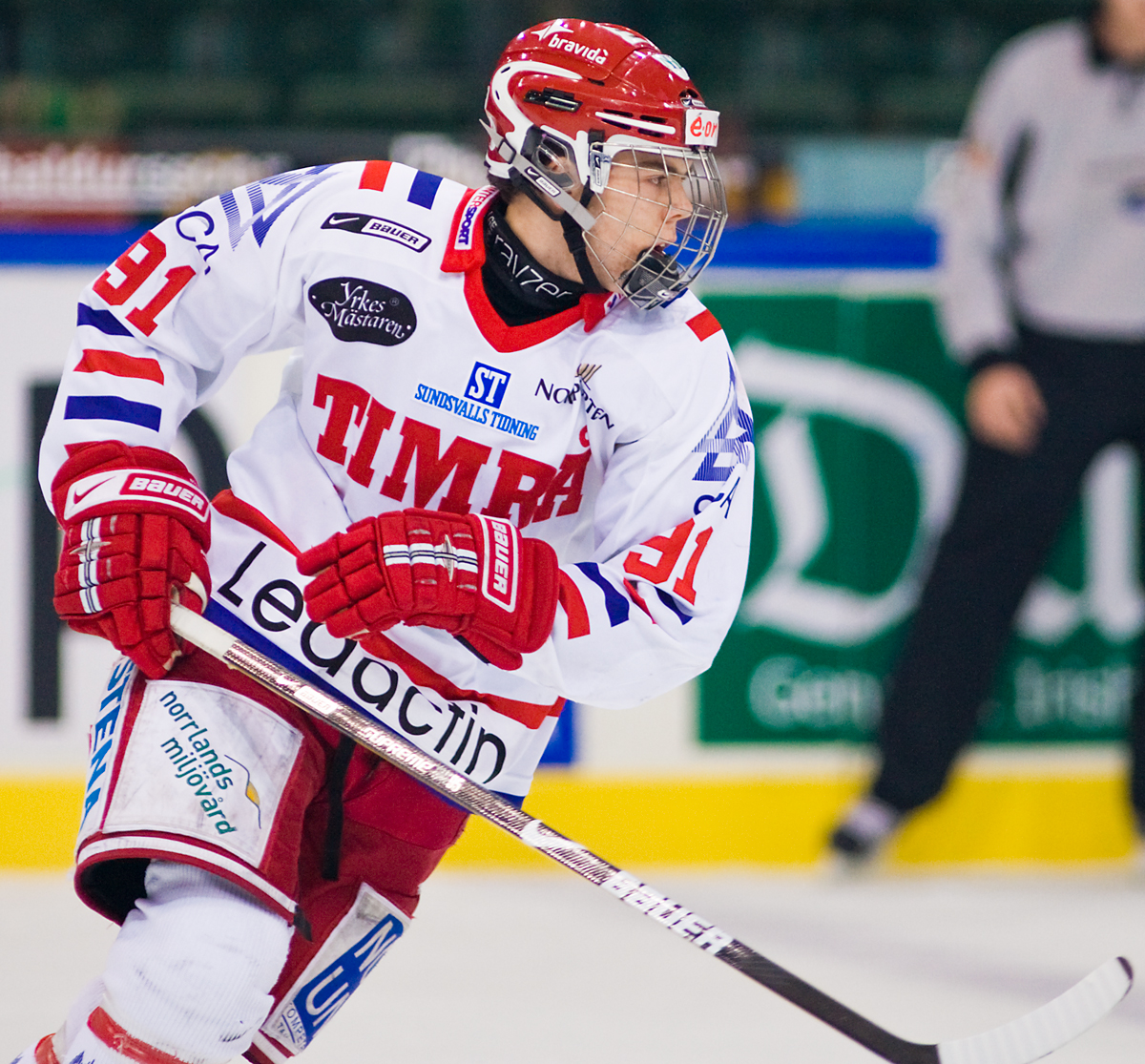
Magnus Paajarvi-Svensson was selected tenth overall by the Edmonton Oilers.

#	Player	Nationality	NHL team	College/junior/club team
1	John Tavares (C)	Canada	New York Islanders	London Knights (OHL)
2	Victor Hedman (D)	Sweden	Tampa Bay Lightning	Modo Hockey (Elitserien)
3	Matt Duchene (C)	Canada	Colorado Avalanche	Brampton Battalion (OHL)
4	Evander Kane (LW)	Canada	Atlanta Thrashers	Vancouver Giants (WHL)
5	Brayden Schenn (C)	Canada	Los Angeles Kings	Brandon Wheat Kings (WHL)
6	Oliver Ekman-Larsson (D)	Sweden	Phoenix Coyotes	Leksands IF (Allsvenskan)
7	Nazem Kadri (C)	Canada	Toronto Maple Leafs	London Knights (OHL)
8	Scott Glennie (RW)	Canada	Dallas Stars	Brandon Wheat Kings (WHL)
9	Jared Cowen (D)	Canada	Ottawa Senators	Spokane Chiefs (WHL)
10	Magnus Paajarvi-Svensson (LW)	Sweden	Edmonton Oilers	Timra IK (Elitserien)
11	Ryan Ellis (D)	Canada	Nashville Predators	Windsor Spitfires (OHL)
12	Calvin de Haan (D)	Canada	New York Islanders (from Minnesota)^{1}	Oshawa Generals (OHL)
13	Zack Kassian (RW)	Canada	Buffalo Sabres	Peterborough Petes (OHL)
14	Dmitri Kulikov (D)	Russia	Florida Panthers	Drummondville Voltigeurs (QMJHL)
15	Peter Holland (C)	Canada	Anaheim Ducks	Guelph Storm (OHL)
16	Nick Leddy (D)	United States	Minnesota Wild (from Columbus via NY Islanders)^{2}	Eden Prairie High School (USHS-Minnesota)
17	David Rundblad (D)	Sweden	St. Louis Blues	Skelleftea AIK (Elitserien)
18	Louis Leblanc (C)	Canada	Montreal Canadiens	Omaha Lancers (USHL)
19	Chris Kreider (C)	United States	New York Rangers	Phillips Academy (USHS-MA)
20	Jacob Josefson (C)	Sweden	New Jersey Devils (from Calgary)^{3}	Djurgardens IF (Elitserien)
21	John Moore (D)	United States	Columbus Blue Jackets (from Philadelphia via Anaheim)^{4}	Chicago Steel (USHL)
22	Jordan Schroeder (C)	United States	Vancouver Canucks	Minnesota Golden Gophers (WCHA)
23	Tim Erixon (D)	Sweden	Calgary Flames (from New Jersey)^{5}	Skelleftea AIK (Elitserien)
24	Marcus Johansson (C)	Sweden	Washington Capitals	Farjestad BK (Elitserien)
25	Jordan Caron (RW)	Canada	Boston Bruins	Rimouski Oceanic (QMJHL)
26	Kyle Palmieri (C/RW)	United States	Anaheim Ducks (from San Jose via Tampa Bay, Ottawa, New York Islanders, and Columbus)^{6}	U.S. NTDP (USHL)
27	Philippe Paradis (C)	Canada	Carolina Hurricanes	Shawinigan Cataractes (QMJHL)
28	Dylan Olsen (D)	Canada	Chicago Blackhawks	Camrose Kodiaks (AJHL)
29	Carter Ashton (RW)	Canada	Tampa Bay Lightning (from Detroit)^{7}	Lethbridge Hurricanes (WHL)
30	Simon Despres (D)	Canada	Pittsburgh Penguins	Saint John Sea Dogs (QMJHL)

Notes

1. The Minnesota Wild's first-round pick went to the New York Islanders as the result of a trade on June 26, 2009 that sent Columbus' first and third-round picks both in 2009 (16th and 77th overall) and a seventh-round pick in 2009 (182nd overall) to Minnesota in exchange for this pick.
2. The Columbus Blue Jackets' first-round pick went to the Minnesota Wild as the result of a trade on June 26, 2009 that sent Minnesota's first-round pick (12th overall) to the New York Islanders in exchange for Columbus' third-round pick in 2009 (77th overall), a seventh-round pick in 2009 (182nd overall) and this pick.
  New York previously acquired this pick as the result of a trade on June 26, 2009 that sent San Jose's first-round pick in 2009 (26th overall), Toronto's second-round pick in 2009 (37th overall), and a third and fourth-round pick both in 2009 (62nd and 92nd overall) to Columbus in exchange for a third-round pick in 2009 (77th overall) and this pick.
3. The Calgary Flames' first-round pick went to the New Jersey Devils as the result of a trade on June 26, 2009 that sent a first and third-round pick both in 2009 (23rd and 84th overall) to Calgary in exchange for this pick.
4. The Philadelphia Flyers' first-round pick went to the Columbus Blue Jackets as the result of a trade on June 26, 2009 that sent San Jose's first-round pick in 2009 (26th overall) and Toronto's second-round pick in 2009 (37th overall) to Anaheim in exchange for this pick.
  Anaheim previously acquired this pick as the result of a trade on June 26, 2009 that sent Chris Pronger and Ryan Dingle to Philadelphia in exchange for Joffrey Lupul, Luca Sbisa, a first-round pick in 2010, a conditional third-round pick in 2010 or 2011, and this pick.
5. The New Jersey Devils' first-round pick went to the Calgary Flames as the result of a trade on June 26, 2009 that sent a first-round pick in 2009 (20th overall) to New Jersey in exchange for a third-round pick in 2009 (84th overall) and this pick.
6. The San Jose Sharks' first-round pick went to the Anaheim Ducks as the result of a trade on June 26, 2009 that sent Philadelphia's first-round pick in 2009 (21st overall) to Columbus in exchange for Toronto's second-round pick in 2009 (37th overall) and this pick.
  Columbus previously acquired this pick as the result of a trade on June 26, 2009 that sent a first and third-round pick both in 2009 (16th and 77th overall) to the New York Islanders in exchange for Toronto's second-round pick in 2009 (37th overall), and a third and fourth-round pick both in 2009 (62nd and 92nd overall) and this pick.
  New York previously acquired this pick as the result of a trade on February 20, 2009 that sent Mike Comrie and Chris Campoli to Ottawa in exchange for Dean McAmmond and this pick.
  Ottawa previously acquired this pick as the result of a trade on August 29, 2008 that sent Andrej Meszaros to Tampa Bay in exchange for Filip Kuba, Alexandre Picard and this pick.
  Tampa Bay previously acquired this pick as the result of a trade on July 4, 2008 that sent Dan Boyle and Brad Lukowich to San Jose in exchange for Matt Carle, Ty Wishart, a fourth-round pick in 2010 and this pick.
7. The Detroit Red Wings' first-round pick went to the Tampa Bay Lightning as the result of a trade on June 26, 2009 that sent a second-round pick in 2009 (32nd overall) and Florida's third-round pick in 2009 (75th overall) to Detroit in exchange for this pick.

=== Round two ===
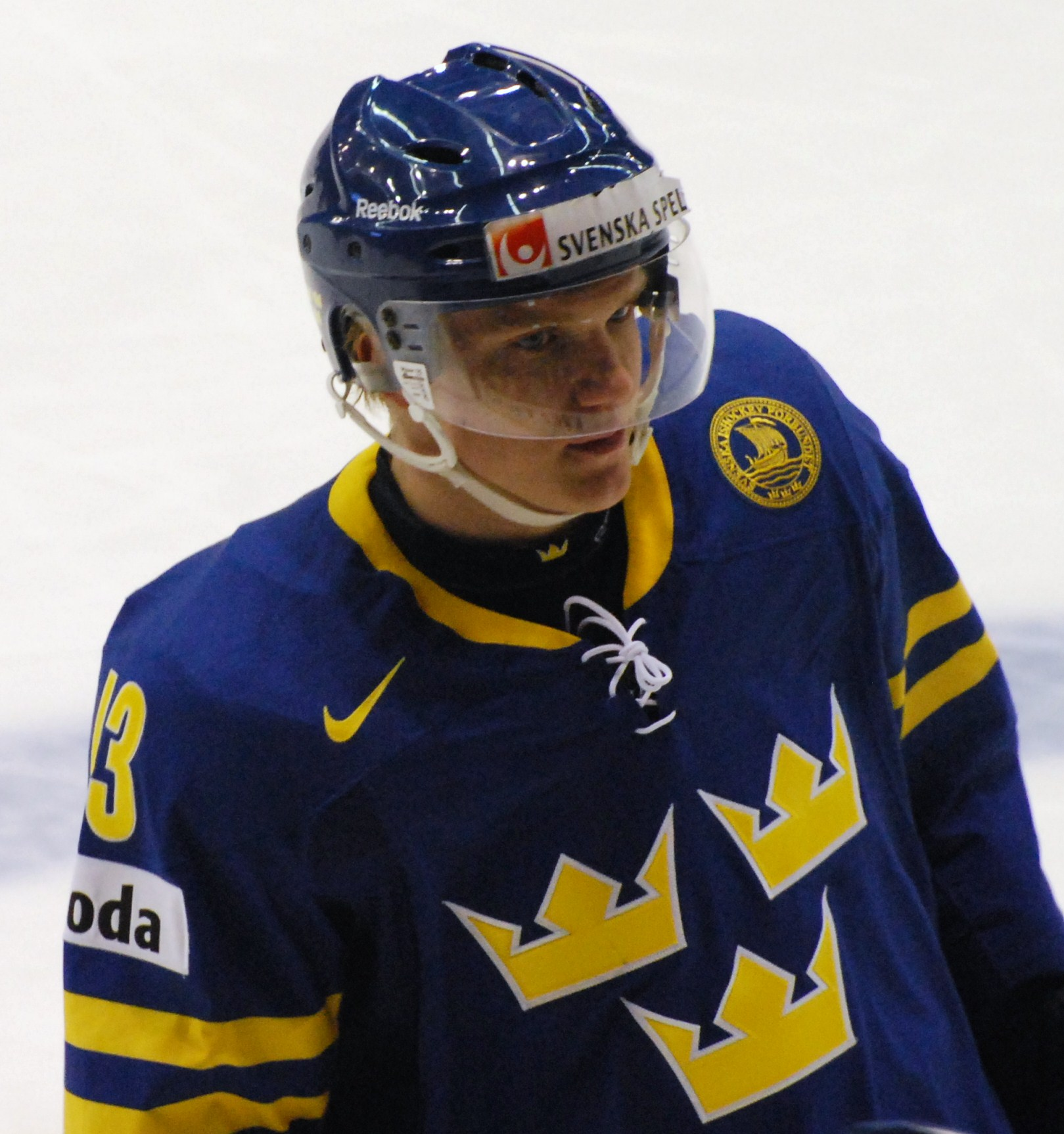
Jakob Silfverberg was selected in the second round (39th overall) by the Ottawa Senators.

#	Player	Nationality	NHL team	College/junior/club team
31	Mikko Koskinen (G)	Finland	New York Islanders	Espoo Blues (SM-liiga)
32	Landon Ferraro (C)	Canada	Detroit Red Wings (from Tampa Bay)^{1}	Red Deer Rebels (WHL)
33	Ryan O'Reilly (C)	Canada	Colorado Avalanche	Erie Otters (OHL)
34	Carl Klingberg (LW)	Sweden	Atlanta Thrashers	Frolunda HC (J20 SuperElit)
35	Kyle Clifford (LW)	Canada	Los Angeles Kings	Barrie Colts (OHL)
36	Chris Brown (C)	United States	Phoenix Coyotes	US NTDP (USHL)
37	Mat Clark (D)	Canada	Anaheim Ducks (from Toronto via NY Islanders and Columbus)^{2}	Brampton Battalion (OHL)
38	Alex Chiasson (RW)	Canada	Dallas Stars	Des Moines Buccaneers (USHL)
39	Jakob Silfverberg (W)	Sweden	Ottawa Senators	Brynas IF (J20 SuperElit)
40	Anton Lander (C)	Sweden	Edmonton Oilers	Timra IK (Elitserien)
41	Zach Budish (RW)	United States	Nashville Predators	Edina High School (USHS-MN)
42	Charles-Olivier Roussel (D)	Canada	Nashville Predators (from Minnesota)^{3}	Shawinigan Cataractes (QMJHL)
43	William Wrenn (D)	United States	San Jose Sharks (from Buffalo)^{4}	U.S. NTDP (USHL)
44	Drew Shore (C)	United States	Florida Panthers	U.S. NTDP (USHL)
45	Jeremy Morin (LW)	United States	Atlanta Thrashers (from Anaheim via Washington and Montreal)^{5}	U.S. NTDP (USHL)
46	Robin Lehner (G)	Sweden	Ottawa Senators (from Columbus)^{6}	Frolunda HC (J20 SuperElit)
47	Ethan Werek (C)	Canada	New York Rangers (compensatory)^{7}	Kingston Frontenacs (OHL)
48	Brett Ponich (D)	Canada	St. Louis Blues	Portland Winterhawks (WHL)
49	Stefan Elliott (D)	Canada	Colorado Avalanche (from Montreal via Calgary)^{8}	Saskatoon Blades (WHL)
50	Kenny Ryan (RW)	United States	Toronto Maple Leafs (from NY Rangers)^{9}	U.S. NTDP (USHL)
51	Brian Dumoulin (D)	United States	Carolina Hurricanes (from Calgary via Los Angeles)^{10}	New Hampshire Junior Monarchs (EJHL)
52	Richard Panik (RW)	Slovakia	Tampa Bay Lightning (from Philadelphia)^{11}	HC Ocelari Trinec (Czech Extraliga)
53	Anton Rodin (LW)	Sweden	Vancouver Canucks	Brynas IF (J20 SuperElit)
54	Eric Gelinas (D)	Canada	New Jersey Devils	Lewiston Maineiacs (QMJHL)
55	Dmitry Orlov (D)	Russia	Washington Capitals	Metallurg Novokuznetsk (KHL)
56	Kevin Lynch (C)	United States	Columbus Blue Jackets (from Boston via NY Islanders)^{12}	U.S. NTDP (USHL)
57	Taylor Doherty (D)	Canada	San Jose Sharks	Kingston Frontenacs (OHL)
58	Jesse Blacker (D)	Canada	Toronto Maple Leafs (from Carolina via Edmonton and Buffalo)^{13}	Windsor Spitfires (OHL)
59	Brandon Pirri (C)	Canada	Chicago Blackhawks	Georgetown Raiders (OJHL)
60	Tomas Tatar (C)	Slovakia	Detroit Red Wings	HKm Zvolen (Slovak Extraliga)
61	Philip Samuelsson (D)	United States	Pittsburgh Penguins	Chicago Steel (USHL)

Notes

1. The Tampa Bay Lightning's second-round pick went to the Detroit Red Wings as the result of a trade on June 26, 2009 that sent a first-round pick in 2009 (29th overall) to Tampa Bay in exchange for Florida's third-round pick in 2009 (75th overall) and this pick.
2. The Toronto Maple Leafs' second-round pick went to the Anaheim Ducks as the result of a trade on June 26, 2009 that sent Philadelphia's first-round pick in 2009 (21st overall) to Columbus in exchange for San Jose's first-round pick in 2009 (26th overall) and this pick.
  Columbus previously acquired this pick as the result of a trade on June 26, 2009 that sent a first and third-round pick both in 2009 (16th and 77th overall) to the New York Islanders in exchange for San Jose's first-round pick in 2009 (26th overall), a third and fourth-round pick both in 2009 (62nd and 92nd overall) and this pick.
  New York previously acquired this pick as the result of a trade on June 20, 2008 that sent a first-round pick in 2008 to Toronto in exchange for a first-round pick in 2008, a third-round pick in 2008 and this pick.
3. The Minnesota Wild's second-round pick went to the Nashville Predators as the result of a trade on July 1, 2008 that sent Marek Zidlicky to Minnesota in exchange for Ryan Jones and this pick.
4. The Buffalo Sabres' second-round pick went to the San Jose Sharks as the result of a trade on July 4, 2008 that sent Craig Rivet and a seventh-round pick in 2010 to Buffalo in exchange for a second-round pick in 2010 and this pick.
5. The Anaheim Ducks' second-round pick went to the Atlanta Thrashers as the result of a trade on February 16, 2009 that sent Mathieu Schneider and a conditional third-round pick in 2009 to Montreal in exchange for a third-round pick in 2010 and this pick.
  Montreal previously acquired this pick in a trade on February 26, 2008 that sent Cristobal Huet to Washington in exchange for this pick.
  Washington previously acquired this pick in a trade on November 19, 2007 that sent Brian Sutherby to Anaheim in exchange for this pick.
6. The Columbus Blue Jackets' second-round pick went to the Ottawa Senators as the result of a trade on March 4, 2009 that sent Antoine Vermette to Columbus in exchange for Pascal Leclaire and this pick.
7. The New York Rangers were awarded the seventeenth pick in the second-round on March 11, 2009 for deceased player Alexei Cherepanov.
8. The Montreal Canadiens' second-round pick went to the Colorado Avalanche as the result of a trade on March 4, 2009 that sent Jordan Leopold to Calgary in exchange for Lawrence Nycholat, Ryan Wilson and this pick.
  Calgary previously acquired this pick as the result of a trade on June 20, 2008 that sent Alex Tanguay and a fifth-round pick in 2008 to Montreal in exchange for a first-round pick in 2008 and this pick.
9. The New York Rangers' second-round pick went to the Toronto Maple Leafs as a result of a trade on March 4, 2009 that sent Nik Antropov to New York in exchange for a conditional fourth-round pick in 2010 and this pick.
10. The Calgary Flames' second-round pick went to the Carolina Hurricanes as the result of a trade on March 4, 2009 that sent Justin Williams to Los Angeles in exchange for Patrick O'Sullivan and this pick.
  Los Angeles previously acquired this pick as the result of a trade on June 20, 2008 that sent Michael Cammalleri and a second-round pick in 2008 to Calgary in exchange for a first-round pick in 2008 and this pick.
11. The Philadelphia Flyers' second-round pick went to the Tampa Bay Lightning as the result of a trade on February 25, 2008 that sent Vaclav Prospal to Philadelphia in exchange for Alexandre Picard and this pick (being conditional at the time of the trade). The condition – Tampa Bay will receive a second-round pick in 2009 if the Flyers qualify for the 2008 Eastern Conference Final – was converted on May 3, 2008.
12. The Boston Bruins' second-round pick went to the Columbus Blue Jackets as the result of a trade on June 27, 2009 that sent a third and fourth-round pick both in 2009 (62nd and 92nd overall) to the New York Islanders in exchange for this pick.
  New York previously acquired this pick as the result of a trade on September 11, 2007 that sent Petteri Nokelainen to Boston in exchange for Ben Walter and this pick (being conditional at the time of the trade). The condition – if Nokelainen plays in 50 or more games in either 2007–08 or 2008–09 OR appears in 90 games total over those seasons – was converted on March 22, 2008.
13. The Carolina Hurricanes' second-round pick went to the Toronto Maple Leafs as the result of a trade on March 4, 2009 that sent Dominic Moore to Buffalo in exchange for this pick.
  Buffalo previously acquired this pick as the result of a trade on March 4, 2009 that sent Ales Kotalik to Edmonton in exchange for this pick.
  Edmonton previously acquired this pick as the result of a trade on March 4, 2009 that sent Erik Cole and a fifth-round pick in 2009 to Carolina in exchange for Patrick O'Sullivan and this pick.

=== Round three ===
#	Player	Nationality	NHL team	College/junior/club team
62	Anders Nilsson (G)	Sweden	New York Islanders (from NY Islanders via Columbus)^{1}	Lulea HF (J20 SuperElit)
63	Ben Hanowski (RW)	United States	Pittsburgh Penguins (from Tampa Bay)^{2}	Little Falls, Minnesota High School (USHS-MN)
64	Tyson Barrie (D)	Canada	Colorado Avalanche	Kelowna Rockets (WHL)
65	Joonas Nattinen (C)	Finland	Montreal Canadiens (from Atlanta)^{3}	Espoo Blues (Jr. A SM-liiga)
66	Brayden McNabb (D)	Canada	Buffalo Sabres (from Los Angeles via Vancouver)^{4}	Kootenay Ice (WHL)
67	Josh Birkholz (RW)	United States	Florida Panthers (from Phoenix via Calgary)^{5}	Fargo Force (USHL)
68	Jamie Devane (LW)	Canada	Toronto Maple Leafs	Plymouth Whalers (OHL)
69	Reilly Smith (RW)	Canada	Dallas Stars	St. Michael's Buzzers (OJHL)
70	Taylor Beck (LW)	Canada	Nashville Predators (from Ottawa)^{6}	Guelph Storm (OHL)
71	Troy Hesketh (D)	United States	Edmonton Oilers	Minnetonka High School (USHS-MN)
72	Michael Latta (C)	Canada	Nashville Predators	Guelph Storm (OHL)
73	Alexander Urbom (D)	Sweden	New Jersey Devils (from Minnesota)^{7}	Djurgardens IF (Elitserien)
74	Ryan Howse (LW)	Canada	Calgary Flames (from Buffalo via Los Angeles)^{8}	Chilliwack Bruins (WHL)
75	Andrej Nestrasil (C/RW)	Czech Republic	Detroit Red Wings (from Florida via Tampa Bay)^{9}	Victoriaville Tigres (QMJHL)
76	Igor Bobkov (G)	Russia	Anaheim Ducks	Metallurg Magnitogorsk (RHFL)
77	Matt Hackett (G)	Canada	Minnesota Wild (from Columbus via New York Islanders)^{10}	Plymouth Whalers (OHL)
78	Sergei Andronov (RW)	Russia	St. Louis Blues	HC Lada Togliatti (KHL)
79	Mac Bennett (D)	United States	Montreal Canadiens	Hotchkiss School (USHS-Connecticut)
80	Ryan Bourque (C)	United States	New York Rangers	U.S. NTDP (USHL)
81	Adam Morrison (G)	Canada	Philadelphia Flyers (from Calgary)^{11}	Saskatoon Blades (WHL)
82	Cameron Abney (RW)	Canada	Edmonton Oilers (from Philadelphia)^{12}	Everett Silvertips (WHL)
83	Kevin Connauton (D)	Canada	Vancouver Canucks	Western Michigan University (CCHA)
84	Nicolas Deslauriers (D)	Canada	Los Angeles Kings (from New Jersey via Calgary)^{13}	Rouyn-Noranda Huskies (QMJHL)
85	Cody Eakin (C)	Canada	Washington Capitals	Swift Current Broncos (WHL)
86	Ryan Button (D)	Canada	Boston Bruins	Prince Albert Raiders (WHL)
87	Simon Bertilsson (D)	Sweden	Philadelphia Flyers (from San Jose via Tampa Bay)^{14}	Brynas IF (J20 SuperElit)
88	Mattias Lindstrom (LW)	Sweden	Carolina Hurricanes	Skelleftea AIK (J20 SuperElit)
89	Daniel Delisle (C/LW)	United States	Chicago Blackhawks	Totino-Grace High School (USHS-MN)
90	Gleason Fournier (D)	Canada	Detroit Red Wings	Rimouski Oceanic (QMJHL)
91	Mike Lee (G)	United States	Phoenix Coyotes (from Pittsburgh via NY Islanders)^{15}	Fargo Force (USHL)

Notes

1. The New York Islanders' third-round pick was re-acquired as the result of a trade on June 27, 2009, that sent Boston's second-round pick in 2009 (56th overall) to Columbus in exchange for a fourth-round pick in 2009 (92nd overall) and this pick.
  Columbus previously acquired this pick as the result of a trade on June 26, 2009, that sent a first and third-round pick both in 2009 (16th and 77th overall) to New York in exchange for San Jose's first-round pick, Toronto's second-round pick, a fourth-round pick all in 2009 (26th, 37th and 92nd overall) and this pick.
2. The Tampa Bay Lightning's third-round pick went to the Pittsburgh Penguins as the result of a trade on June 28, 2008, that sent Gary Roberts and Ryan Malone to Tampa Bay in exchange for this pick (being conditional at the time of the trade). The condition – Ryan Malone is signed by Tampa Bay prior to the 2008–09 season – was converted on June 30, 2008.
3. The Atlanta Thrashers' third-round pick went to the Montreal Canadiens as the result of a trade on February 17, 2009, that sent Anaheim's second-round pick in 2009 and a third-round pick in 2010 to Atlanta in exchange for Mathieu Schneider and this pick (being conditional at the time of the trade). The condition – Montreal will receive a third-round pick in 2009 if they are eliminated in the Conference Quarterfinals of the 2009 Stanley Cup playoffs – was converted on April 22, 2009.
4. The Los Angeles Kings' third-round pick went to the Buffalo Sabres as the result of a trade on July 4, 2008, that sent Steve Bernier to Vancouver in exchange for a second-round pick in 2010 and this pick.
  Vancouver previously acquired this pick as the result of a trade on July 5, 2006, that sent Dan Cloutier to Los Angeles for a second-round pick in 2007 and this pick (being conditional at time of trade). The condition – Cloutier resigning with the Los Angeles Kings – was converted on September 27, 2006.
5. The Phoenix Coyotes' third-round pick went to the Florida Panthers as the result of a trade on June 27, 2009, that sent Jay Bouwmeester to Calgary in exchange for Jordan Leopold and this pick.
  Calgary previously acquired this pick as the result of a trade on March 4, 2009, that sent Matthew Lombardi, Brandon Prust and a conditional first-round pick in either 2009 or 2010 to Phoenix in exchange for Olli Jokinen and this pick.
6. The Ottawa Senators' third-round pick went to the Nashville Predators as the result of a trade on June 20, 2008, that sent a first-round pick in 2008 to Ottawa in exchange for a first-round pick in 2008 and this pick.
7. The Minnesota Wild's third-round pick went to the New Jersey Devils as the result of a trade on June 20, 2008, that sent a first-round pick in 2008 to Minnesota in exchange for a first-round pick in 2008 and this pick.
8. The Buffalo Sabres' third-round pick went to the Calgary Flames as the result of a trade on June 27, 2009, that sent New Jersey's third-round pick and Columbus' fourth-round pick both in 2009 (84th and 107th overall) to Los Angeles in exchange for this pick.
  Los Angeles previously acquired this pick as the result of a trade on June 20, 2008, that sent a first-round pick in 2008 to Buffalo in exchange for a first-round pick in 2008 and this pick.
9. The Florida Panthers' third-round pick went to the Detroit Red Wings as the result of a trade on June 26, 2009, that sent a first-round pick in 2009 (29th overall) to Tampa Bay in exchange for a second-round pick in 2009 (32nd overall) and this pick.
  Tampa Bay previously acquired this pick as the result of a trade on March 4, 2009, that sent Steve Eminger to Florida in exchange for Noah Welch and this pick.
10. The Columbus Blue Jackets' third-round pick went to the Minnesota Wild as the result of a trade on June 26, 2009, that sent a first-round pick in 2009 (12th overall) to the New York Islanders in exchange for Columbus' first-round pick in 2009 (16th overall), a seventh-round pick in 2009 (182nd overall) and this pick.
  New York previously acquired this pick as the result of a trade on June 26, 2009, that sent San Jose's first-round pick, Toronto's second-round pick, a third-round pick and a fourth-round pick all in 2009 (26th, 37th, 62nd and 92nd overall) to Columbus in exchange for a first-round pick in 2009 (16th overall) and this pick.
11. The Calgary Flames' third-round pick went to the Philadelphia Flyers as the result of a trade on February 20, 2008, that sent Jim Vandermeer to Calgary in exchange for this pick.
12. The Philadelphia Flyers' third-round pick went to the Edmonton Oilers as the result of a trade on July 1, 2007, that sent Joffrey Lupul and Jason Smith to Philadelphia in exchange for Joni Pitkanen and Geoff Sanderson and this pick.
13. The New Jersey Devils' third-round pick went to the Los Angeles Kings as the result of a trade on June 27, 2009, that sent a third-round pick in 2009 (74th overall) to Calgary in exchange for a fourth-round pick in 2009 (107th overall) and this pick.
  Calgary previously acquired this pick as the result of a trade on June 26, 2009, that sent a first-round pick in 2009 (20th overall) to New Jersey in exchange for a first-round pick in 2009 (23rd overall) and this pick.
14. The San Jose Sharks' third-round pick went to the Philadelphia Flyers as the result of a trade on November 7, 2008, that sent Steve Downie, Steve Eminger, and Tampa Bay's fourth-round pick in 2009 to Tampa Bay in exchange for Matt Carle and this pick.
  Tampa Bay previously acquired this pick as the result of a trade on June 21, 2008, that sent a third-round pick in 2008 to San Jose in exchange for a fourth-round pick in 2008, a fifth-round pick in 2008 and this pick.
15. The Pittsburgh Penguins' third-round pick went to the Phoenix Coyotes as the result of a trade on June 27, 2009, that sent a third-round pick in 2010 to the New York Islanders in exchange for this pick.
  New York previously acquired this pick as the result of a trade on March 4, 2009, that sent Bill Guerin to Pittsburgh in exchange for this pick (being conditional at the time of the trade). The conditions – Pittsburgh advance past the first round of the 2009 Stanley Cup playoffs and Guerin plays in more than 50% of those First round games – were converted on April 21 and 25, 2009, respectively.

=== Round four ===
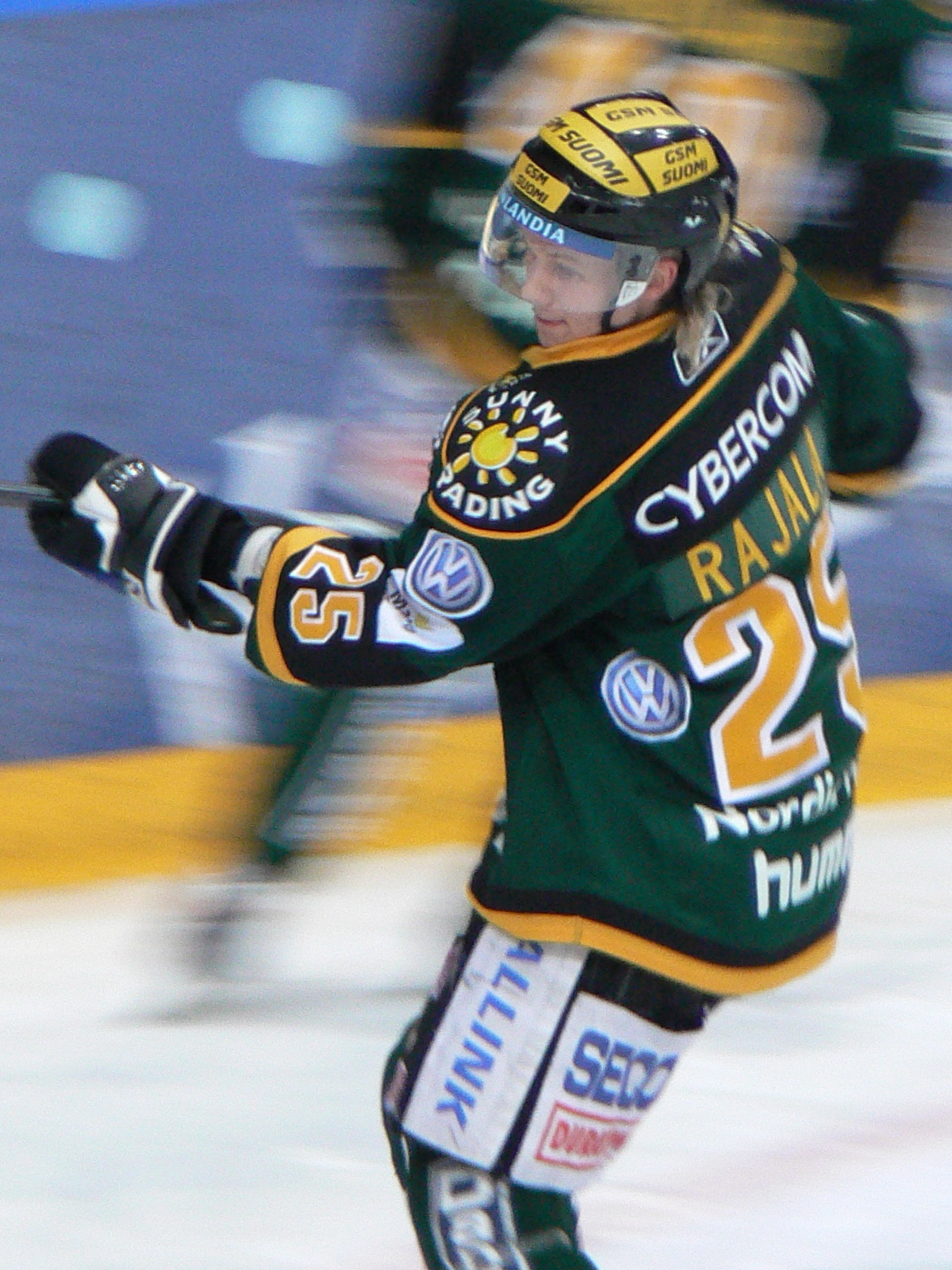
Toni Rajala, a fourth-round selection of the Edmonton Oilers.

#	Player	Nationality	NHL team	College/junior/club team
92	Casey Cizikas	Canada	New York Islanders (from NY Islanders via Columbus)^{1}	Mississauga St. Michael's Majors (OHL)
93	Alex Hutchings	Canada	Tampa Bay Lightning (from Tampa Bay via Philadelphia)^{2}	Barrie Colts (OHL)
94	David Savard	Canada	Columbus Blue Jackets (from Colorado)^{3}	Moncton Wildcats (QMJHL)
95	Jean-Francois Berube	Canada	Los Angeles Kings (from Atlanta)^{4}	Montreal Junior Hockey Club (QMJHL)
96	Linden Vey	Canada	Los Angeles Kings	Medicine Hat Tigers (WHL)
97	Jordan Szwarz	Canada	Phoenix Coyotes	Saginaw Spirit (OHL)
98	Craig Smith	United States	Nashville Predators (from Toronto via San Jose)^{5}	Waterloo Black Hawks (USHL)
99	Kyle Bigos	United States	Edmonton Oilers (from Dallas via Tampa Bay and Minnesota)^{6}	Vernon Vipers (BCHL)
100	Chris Wideman	United States	Ottawa Senators	Miami RedHawks (Central Collegiate Hockey Association)
101	Toni Rajala	Finland	Edmonton Oilers	Ilves (SM-liiga)
102	Mattias Ekholm	Sweden	Nashville Predators	Mora IK (Allsvenskan)
103	Kris Foucault	Canada	Minnesota Wild	Calgary Hitmen (WHL)
104	Marcus Foligno	Canada	Buffalo Sabres	Sudbury Wolves (OHL)
105	Justin Weller	Canada	Phoenix Coyotes (from Florida)^{7}	Red Deer Rebels (WHL)
106	Sami Vatanen	Finland	Anaheim Ducks	JYP Jyvaskyla (SM-liiga)
107	Garrett Wilson	Canada	Florida Panthers (from Columbus via Calgary and Los Angeles)^{8}	Owen Sound Attack (OHL)
108	Tyler Shattock	Canada	St. Louis Blues	Kamloops Blazers (WHL)
109	Alexander Avtsin	Russia	Montreal Canadiens	Dynamo Moscow (Russian Hockey First League)
110	Nick Oliver	United States	Nashville Predators (from NY Rangers)^{9}	Roseau High School (USHS-Minnesota)
111	Henrik Bjorklund	Sweden	Calgary Flames	Farjestad BK (Elitserien)
112	Lane MacDermid	Canada	Boston Bruins (from Philadelphia)^{10}	Windsor Spitfires (OHL)
113	Jeremy Price	Canada	Vancouver Canucks	Nepean Raiders (Central Junior A Hockey League)
114	Seth Helgeson	United States	New Jersey Devils	Sioux City Musketeers (USHL)
115	Patrick Wey	United States	Washington Capitals	Waterloo Black Hawks (USHL)
116	Alexander Fallstrom	Sweden	Minnesota Wild (from Boston)^{11}	Shattuck-St. Mary's School (Midget Major AAA)
117	Edward Pasquale	Canada	Atlanta Thrashers (from San Jose via Los Angeles)^{12}	Saginaw Spirit (OHL)
118	Forfeited pick^{13}		~~Toronto Maple Leafs (from Carolina via Tampa Bay)~~	
119	Byron Froese	Canada	Chicago Blackhawks	Everett Silvertips (WHL)
120	Ben Chiarot	Canada	Atlanta Thrashers (from Detroit via Los Angeles)^{14}	Guelph Storm (OHL)
121	Nick Petersen	Canada	Pittsburgh Penguins	Shawinigan Cataractes (QMJHL)

Notes

1. The New York Islanders' fourth-round pick temporarily went to the Columbus Blue Jackets as the result of a trade on June 26, 2009, that sent a first-round pick (#16 overall) in 2009 and a third-round pick (#77 overall) in 2009 to the New York Islanders in exchange for a first-round pick (#26 overall) in 2009, a second-round pick (#37 overall) in 2009, a third-round pick (#62 overall) in 2009 and this pick.
  New York re-acquired the pick as the result of a trade on June 27, 2009, that sent a second-round pick (#56 overall) in 2009 to Columbus in exchange for a fourth-round pick (#92 overall) in 2009 and this pick.
2. The Tampa Bay Lightning's fourth-round pick temporarily went to the Philadelphia Flyers as the result of a trade on June 18, 2008, that sent Vaclav Prospal to Tampa Bay in exchange for Nashville's seventh-round pick in 2008 and this pick (being conditional at the time of the trade). The condition – Vaclav Prospal is signed by Tampa Bay prior to the 2008–09 season – was converted on June 30, 2008.
  Tampa Bay reacquired the pick as the result of a trade on November 7, 2008, that sent Matt Carle and San Jose's third-round pick in 2009 to the Philadelphia Flyers in exchange for Steve Downie, Steve Eminger and this pick.
3. The Colorado Avalanche's pick went to the Columbus Blue Jackets as the result of a trade on February 26, 2008, that sent Adam Foote to Colorado for a conditional first-round pick in 2008 or 2009 and this pick (being conditional at the time of trade). The condition – Adam Foote is re-signed by Colorado prior to the 2008–09 season – was converted on June 30, 2008.
4. The Atlanta Thrashers' fourth-round pick went to the Los Angeles Kings as the result of a trade on June 27, 2009, that sent two fourth-round picks (#117 and No. 120 overall) in 2009 and a seventh-round pick (#203 overall) in 2009 to Atlanta in exchange for this pick.
5. The Toronto Maple Leafs' fourth-round pick went to the Nashville Predators as the result of a trade on June 21, 2008, that sent a fourth-round pick in 2008 to the San Jose Sharks in exchange for a seventh-round pick in 2008 and this pick.
  San Jose previously acquired this pick as the result of a trade on June 22, 2007, that sent Vesa Toskala and Mark Bell to Toronto in exchange for a first-round pick in 2007, a second-round pick in 2007 and this pick.
6. The Dallas Stars' fourth-round pick went to the Edmonton Oilers as the result of a trade on June 27, 2009, that sent Kyle Brodziak and a sixth-round pick (#161 overall) to the Minnesota Wild in exchange for a fifth-round pick (#133 overall) in 2009 and this pick.
  Minnesota previously acquired this pick as the result of a trade on June 29, 2008, that sent Brian Rolston to the Tampa Bay Lightning in exchange for this pick (being conditional at the time of trade). The conditions – Ryan Malone is signed by Tampa Bay, Brian Rolston is not – have been verified on June 30, 2008 and July 1, 2008, respectively.
  Tampa Bay previously acquired this pick in a trade on February 26, 2008, that sent Brad Richards and Johan Holmqvist to Dallas in exchange for Mike Smith, Jussi Jokinen, Jeff Halpern and this pick.
7. The Florida Panthers' fourth-round pick went to the Phoenix Coyotes as the result of a trade on June 21, 2008, that sent a second-round pick in 2008 to Florida in exchange for a second-round pick in 2008 and this pick.
8. The Columbus Blue Jackets' fourth-round pick went to the Florida Panthers as the result of a trade on June 27, 2009, that sent a third-round pick in 2010 to the Los Angeles Kings in exchange for a fifth-round pick (#138 overall) in 2009 and this pick.
  Los Angeles previously acquired this pick as the result of a trade on June 27, 2009, that sent a third-round pick (#74 overall) in 2009 to the Calgary Flames in exchange for a third-round pick (#84 overall) in 2009 and this pick.
  Calgary previously acquired this pick as the result of a trade on March 4, 2009, that sent Kevin Lalande to Columbus in exchange for this pick.
9. The New York Rangers' fourth-round pick went to the Nashville Predators as the result of a trade on June 21, 2008, that sent a fourth-round pick in 2008 to New York in exchange for a seventh-round pick in 2008 and this pick.
10. The Philadelphia Flyers' fourth-round pick went to the Boston Bruins as the result of a trade on October 13, 2008, that sent Andrew Alberts to Philadelphia in exchange for Ned Lukacevic and this pick (being conditional at the time of the trade). The condition – Philadelphia does not re-sign Alberts before his contract expires after the 2008–09 season – was converted prior to the draft day.
11. The Boston Bruins' fourth-round pick went to the Minnesota Wild as the result of a trade on June 30, 2007, that sent Manny Fernandez to Boston in exchange for Petr Kalus and this pick.
12. The San Jose Sharks' fourth-round pick went to the Atlanta Thrashers as the result of a trade on June 27, 2009, that sent a fourth-round pick (#95 overall) in 2009 to the Los Angeles Kings in exchange for a fourth-round pick (#120 overall) in 2009, a seventh-round pick (#203 overall) in 2009 and this pick.
  Los Angeles previously acquired this pick as the result of a trade on June 21, 2008, that sent a fourth-round pick in 2008 to San Jose in exchange for a fifth-round pick in 2010 and this pick.
13. The Carolina Hurricanes' fourth-round pick, owned by the Toronto Maple Leafs, was forfeited as punishment for the violation of Jonas Frogren's contract, under the NHL Collective Bargaining Agreement.
  Toronto previously acquired this pick as the result of a trade on March 4, 2009, that sent Richard Petiot to the Tampa Bay Lightning in exchange for Olaf Kolzig, Andy Rogers, Jamie Heward and this pick.
  Tampa Bay previously acquired this pick as the result of a trade on February 7, 2009, that sent Jussi Jokinen to Carolina in exchange for Wade Brookbank, Josef Melichar and this pick.
14. The Detroit Red Wings' fourth-round pick went to the Atlanta Thrashers as the result of a trade on June 27, 2009, that sent a fourth-round pick (#95 overall) in 2009 to the Los Angeles Kings in exchange for a fourth-round pick (#117 overall) in 2009, a seventh-round pick (#203 overall) in 2009 and this pick.
  Los Angeles previously acquired this pick as the result of a trade on February 26, 2008, that sent Brad Stuart to Detroit in exchange for a second-round pick in 2008 and this pick.

=== Round five ===
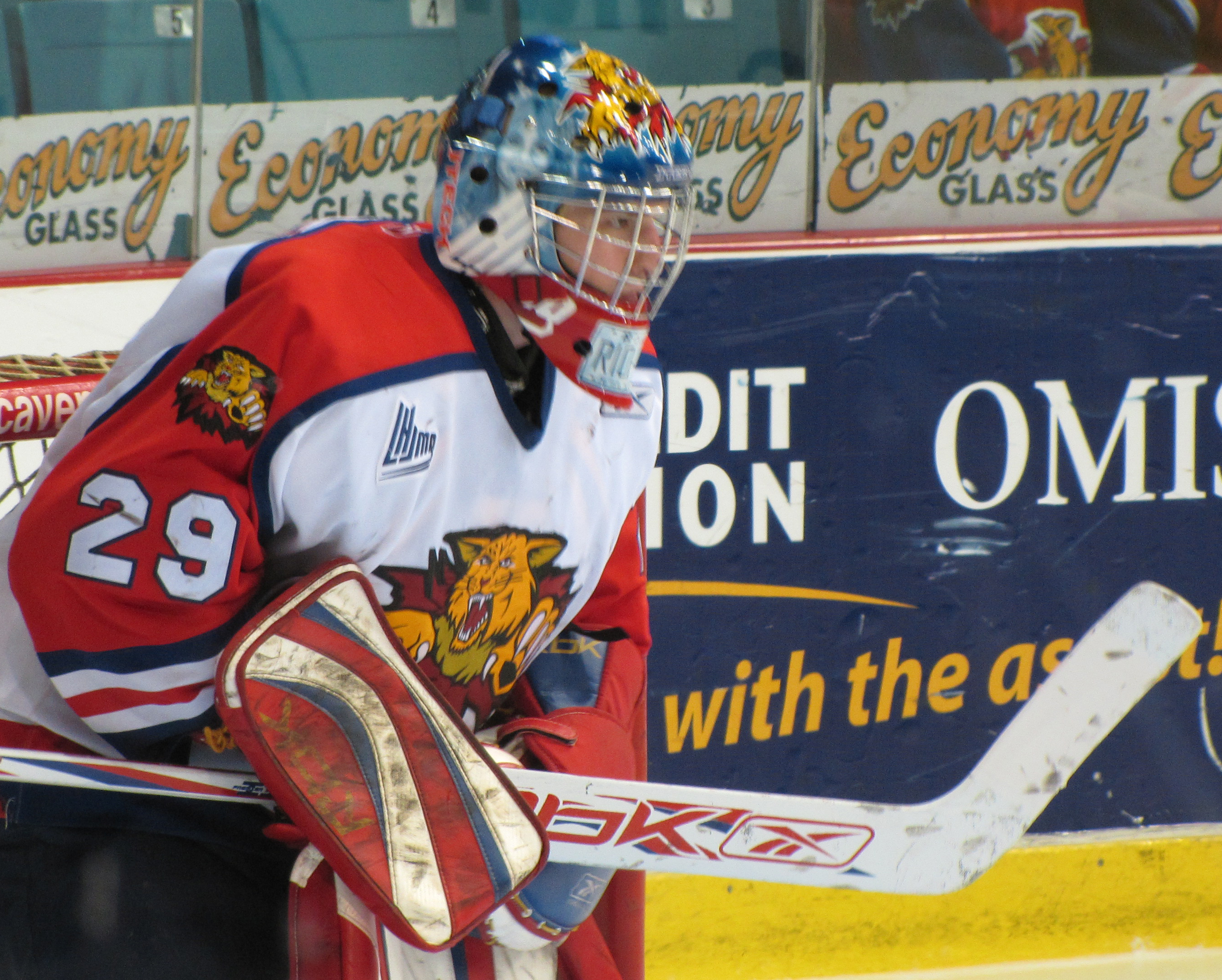
Nicola Riopel, a fifth round selection of the Philadelphia Flyers.

#	Player	Nationality	NHL team	College/junior/club team
122	Anton Klementyev	Russia	New York Islanders	Lokomotiv Yaroslavl (Russian Hockey First League)
123	Alex Velischek	Canada	Pittsburgh Penguins (from Tampa Bay)^{1}	Delbarton School (USHS-NJ)
124	Kieran Millan	Canada	Colorado Avalanche	Boston University (Hockey East)
125	Cody Sol	Canada	Atlanta Thrashers	Saginaw Spirit (OHL)
126	David Kolomatis	United States	Los Angeles Kings	Owen Sound Attack (OHL)
127	Roman Horak	Czech Republic	New York Rangers (from Phoenix)^{2}	HC Ceske Budejovice (Czech Extraliga)
128	Eric Knodel	United States	Toronto Maple Leafs	Philadelphia Junior Flyers (Atlantic Junior Hockey League)
129	Tomas Vincour	Czech Republic	Dallas Stars	Edmonton Oil Kings (WHL)
130	Mike Hoffman	Canada	Ottawa Senators	Drummondville Voltigeurs (QMJHL)
131	Matt Kennedy	Canada	Carolina Hurricanes (from Edmonton)^{3}	Guelph Storm (OHL)
132	Gabriel Bourque	Canada	Nashville Predators	Baie-Comeau Drakkar (QMJHL)
133	Olivier Roy	Canada	Edmonton Oilers (from Minnesota)^{4}	Cape Breton Screaming Eagles (QMJHL)
134	Mark Adams	United States	Buffalo Sabres	Malden Catholic (USHS-MA)
135	Corban Knight	Canada	Florida Panthers	Okotoks Oilers (AJHL)
136	Radoslav Illo	Slovakia	Anaheim Ducks	Tri-City Storm (USHL)
137	Thomas Larkin	Italy	Columbus Blue Jackets	Phillips Exeter Academy (USHS-NH)
138	Wade Megan	United States	Florida Panthers (from St. Louis via Los Angeles)^{5}	South Kent School (USHS-CT)
139	Gabriel Dumont	Canada	Montreal Canadiens	Drummondville Voltigeurs (QMJHL)
140	Scott Stajcer	Canada	New York Rangers	Owen Sound Attack (OHL)
141	Spencer Bennett	Canada	Calgary Flames	Surrey Eagles (BCHL)
142	Nicola Riopel	Canada	Philadelphia Flyers	Moncton Wildcats (QMJHL)
143	Peter Andersson	Sweden	Vancouver Canucks	Frolunda HC (J20 SuperElit)
144	Derek Rodwell	Canada	New Jersey Devils	Okotoks Oilers (AJHL)
145	Brett Flemming	Canada	Washington Capitals	Mississauga St. Michaels Majors (OHL)
146	Jeff Costello	United States	Ottawa Senators (from Boston via Phoenix)^{6}	Cedar Rapids Roughriders (USHL)
147	Phil Varone	Canada	San Jose Sharks	London Knights (OHL)
148	Michael Zador	Canada	Tampa Bay Lightning (from Carolina via Nashville)^{7}	Oshawa Generals (OHL)
149	Marcus Kruger	Sweden	Chicago Blackhawks	Djurgardens IF (Elitserien)
150	Nick Jensen	United States	Detroit Red Wings	Green Bay Gamblers (USHL)
151	Andy Bathgate	Canada	Pittsburgh Penguins (from Pittsburgh via Toronto and NY Rangers)^{8}	Belleville Bulls (OHL)

Notes

1. The Tampa Bay Lightning's fifth-round pick went to the Pittsburgh Penguins as the result of a trade on October 1, 2008, that sent Michal Sersen to Tampa Bay for this pick.
2. The Phoenix Coyotes' fifth-round pick went to the New York Rangers as the result of a trade on February 26, 2008, that sent Marcel Hossa and Al Montoya to Phoenix in exchange for Fredrik Sjostrom, Josh Gratton, David LeNeveu and this pick.
3. The Edmonton Oilers' fifth-round pick went to the Carolina Hurricanes as the result of a trade on March 4, 2009, that sent Patrick O'Sullivan and a second-round pick in 2009 to Edmonton in exchange for Erik Cole and this pick.
4. The Minnesota Wild's fifth-round pick went to the Edmonton Oilers as the result of a trade on June 27, 2009, that sent Kyle Brodziak and a sixth-round pick (#161 overall) to Minnesota in exchange for a fourth-round pick (#99 overall) in 2009 and this pick.
5. The St. Louis Blues' fifth-round pick went to the Florida Panthers as the result of a trade on June 27, 2008, that sent a third-round pick in 2010 to the Los Angeles Kings in exchange for a fifth-round pick (#107 overall) in 2009 and this pick.
  Los Angeles previously acquired this pick as the result of a trade on June 4, 2008, that sent T. J. Fast to St. Louis for this pick.
6. The Boston Bruins' fifth-round pick went to the Ottawa Senators as the result of a trade on June 25, 2008, that sent Brian McGrattan to the Phoenix Coyotes for this pick.
  Phoenix previously acquired this pick as the result of a trade on December 6, 2007, that sent Alex Auld to Boston for Nate DiCasmirro and this pick.
7. The Carolina Hurricanes' fifth-round pick went to the Tampa Bay Lightning as the result of a trade on June 27, 2008, that sent a fifth-round pick in 2010 to the Nashville Predators in exchange for this pick.
  Los Angeles previously acquired this pick as the result of a trade on June 19, 2008, that sent Darcy Hordichuk and a conditional fifth-round pick in 2010 to Carolina for this pick.
8. The Pittsburgh Penguins' re-acquired their fifth-round pick from the New York Rangers as the result of a trade on June 27, 2009, that sent Chad Johnson to New York in exchange for this pick.
  New York previously acquired this pick as the result of a trade on July 14, 2008, that sent Ryan Hollweg to the Toronto Maple Leafs in exchange for this pick.
  Toronto previously acquired this pick in a trade on February 26, 2008, that sent Hal Gill to Pittsburgh for a second-round pick in 2008 and this pick.

=== Round six ===
#	Player	Nationality	NHL team	College/junior/club team
152	Anders Lee	United States	New York Islanders	Edina High School (USHS-MN)
153	Dave Labrecque	Canada	Philadelphia Flyers (from Tampa Bay)^{1}	Shawinigan Cataractes (QMJHL)
154	Brandon Maxwell	United States	Colorado Avalanche	U.S. NTDP (USHL)
155	Jimmy Bubnick	Canada	Atlanta Thrashers	Kamloops Blazers (WHL)
156	Michael Pelech	Canada	Los Angeles Kings	Mississauga St. Michael's Majors (OHL)
157	Evan Bloodoff	Canada	Phoenix Coyotes	Kelowna Rockets (WHL)
158	Jerry D'Amigo	United States	Toronto Maple Leafs	U.S. NTDP (USHL)
159	Curtis McKenzie	Canada	Dallas Stars	Penticton Vees (BCHL)
160	Corey Cowick	Canada	Ottawa Senators	Ottawa 67's (OHL)
161	Darcy Kuemper	Canada	Minnesota Wild (from Edmonton)^{2}	Red Deer Rebels (WHL)
162	Jaroslav Janus	Slovakia	Tampa Bay Lightning (from Nashville)^{3}	Erie Otters (OHL)
163	Jere Sallinen	Finland	Minnesota Wild	Espoo Blues Junior (Jr. A SM-liiga)
164	Connor Knapp	United States	Buffalo Sabres	Miami University (CCHA)
165	Scott Timmins	Canada	Florida Panthers	Windsor Spitfires (OHL)
166	Scott Valentine	Canada	Anaheim Ducks	Oshawa Generals (OHL)
167	Anton Blomqvist	Sweden	Columbus Blue Jackets	Malmo Redhawks (J20 SuperElit)
168	David Shields	United States	St. Louis Blues	Erie Otters (OHL)
169	Dustin Walsh	Canada	Montreal Canadiens	Kingston Voyageurs (OJHL)
170	Daniel Maggio	Canada	New York Rangers	Sudbury Wolves (OHL)
171	Joni Ortio	Finland	Calgary Flames	TPS Junior (Jr. A SM-liiga)
172	Eric Wellwood	Canada	Philadelphia Flyers	Windsor Spitfires (OHL)
173	Joe Cannata	United States	Vancouver Canucks	Merrimack College (Hockey East)
174	Ashton Bernard	Canada	New Jersey Devils	Shawinigan Cataractes (QMJHL)
175	Garrett Mitchell	Canada	Washington Capitals	Regina Pats (WHL)
176	Tyler Randell	Canada	Boston Bruins	Kitchener Rangers (OHL)
177	David Pacan	Canada	Chicago Blackhawks (from San Jose via Columbus and Atlanta)^{4}	Cumberland Grads (CCHL)
178	Rasmus Rissanen	Finland	Carolina Hurricanes	KalPa Junior (Jr. A SM-liiga)
179	Brandon Kozun	Canada	Los Angeles Kings (from Chicago)^{5}	Calgary Hitmen (WHL)
180	Mitch Callahan	United States	Detroit Red Wings	Kelowna Rockets (WHL)
181	Viktor Ekbom	Sweden	Pittsburgh Penguins	IK Oskarshamn (Allsvenskan)

Notes

1. The Tampa Bay Lightning's sixth-round pick went to the Philadelphia Flyers as the result of a trade on June 30, 2008, that sent Janne Niskala to Tampa Bay in exchange for this pick.
2. The Edmonton Oilers' sixth-round pick went to the Minnesota Wild as the result of a trade on June 27, 2009, that sent a fourth-round pick (#99 overall) in 2009 and a fifth-round pick (#133 overall) in 2009 to Edmonton in exchange for Kyle Brodziak and this pick.
3. The Nashville Predators' sixth-round pick went to the Tampa Bay Lightning as the result of a trade on September 29, 2008, that sent Nick Tarnasky to Nashville in exchange for this pick (being conditional at the time of the trade). The condition – Tampa Bay receives the pick if Nick Tarnasky plays no more than 55 games for Nashville in the 2008–09 season – was verified on November 27, 2008 when Tarnasky was traded to the Florida Panthers.
4. The San Jose Sharks' sixth-round pick went to the Chicago Blackhawks as the result of a trade on June 27, 2009, that sent a fifth-round pick in 2010 to the Atlanta Thrashers in exchange for this pick.
  Atlanta previously acquired this pick as the result of a trade on January 14, 2009, that sent Jason Williams to the Columbus Blue Jackets in exchange for Clay Wilson and this pick.
  Columbus previously acquired this pick in a trade on January 29, 2008, that sent Jody Shelley to San Jose for this pick.
5. The Chicago Blackhawks' sixth-round pick went to the Los Angeles Kings as the result of a trade on June 21, 2008, that sent a sixth-round pick in 2008 to Chicago in exchange for this pick.

=== Round seven ===
#	Player	Nationality	NHL team	College/junior/club team
182	Erik Haula	Finland	Minnesota Wild (from New York Islanders)^{1}	Shattuck-St. Mary's School (Midget Major AAA)
183	Kirill Gotovets	Belarus	Tampa Bay Lightning	Shattuck-St. Mary's School (Midget Major AAA)
184	Gus Young	United States	Colorado Avalanche	Noble and Greenough School (USHS-MA)
185	Levko Koper	Canada	Atlanta Thrashers	Spokane Chiefs (WHL)
186	Jordan Nolan	Canada	Los Angeles Kings	Sault Ste. Marie Greyhounds (OHL)
187	Steven Anthony	Canada	Vancouver Canucks (from Phoenix)^{2}	Saint John Sea Dogs (QMJHL)
188	Barron Smith	United States	Toronto Maple Leafs	Peterborough Petes (OHL)
189	Marek Viedensky	Slovakia	San Jose Sharks (from Dallas)^{3}	Prince George Cougars (WHL)
190	Brad Peltz	United States	Ottawa Senators	Avon Old Farms (USHS-CT)
191	Michael Sdao	United States	Ottawa Senators (from Edmonton)^{4}	Lincoln Stars (USHL)
192	Cam Reid	Canada	Nashville Predators	Westside Warriors (BCHL)
193	Anthony Hamburg	United States	Minnesota Wild	Dallas Jr. Stars (Midget Major AAA)
194	Maxime Legault	Canada	Buffalo Sabres	Shawinigan Cataractes (QMJHL)
195	Paul Phillips	United States	Chicago Blackhawks (from Florida)^{5}	Cedar Rapids RoughRiders (USHL)
196	Oliver Lauridsen	Denmark	Philadelphia Flyers (from Anaheim)^{6}	St. Cloud State University (WCHA)
197	Kyle Neuber	Canada	Columbus Blue Jackets	Mississauga St. Michael's Majors (OHL)
198	Nic Dowd	United States	Los Angeles Kings (from St. Louis)^{7}	Wenatchee Wild (NAHL)
199	Michael Cichy	United States	Montreal Canadiens	Indiana Ice (USHL)
200	Mikhail Pashnin	Russia	New York Rangers	HC Mechel (Russian Major League)
201	Gaelan Patterson	Canada	Calgary Flames	Saskatoon Blades (WHL)
202	Maxwell Tardy	United States	St. Louis Blues (from Philadelphia via Nashville)^{8}	Duluth East High School (USHS-MN)
203	Jordan Samuels-Thomas	United States	Atlanta Thrashers (from Vancouver via Los Angeles)^{9}	Waterloo Black Hawks (USHL)
204	Curtis Gedig	Canada	New Jersey Devils	Cowichan Valley Capitals (BCHL)
205	Benjamin Casavant	Canada	Washington Capitals	P.E.I. Rocket (QMJHL)
206	Ben Sexton	Canada	Boston Bruins	Nepean Raiders (CCHL)
207	Dominik Bielke	Germany	San Jose Sharks	Eisbaren Berlin (DEL)
208	Tommi Kivisto	Finland	Carolina Hurricanes	Red Deer Rebels (WHL)
209	David Gilbert	Canada	Chicago Blackhawks	Quebec Remparts (QMJHL)
210	Adam Almqvist	Sweden	Detroit Red Wings	HV71 (J20 SuperElit)
211	Petteri Simila	Finland	Montreal Canadiens (from Pittsburgh)^{10}	Karpat (Jr. A SM-liiga)

Notes

1. The New York Islanders' seventh-round pick went to the Minnesota Wild as the result of a trade on June 26, 2009, that sent a first-round pick (#12 overall) to the New York Islanders in exchange for a first-round pick (#16 overall) in 2009, a third-round pick (#77 overall) in 2009 and this pick.
2. The Phoenix Coyotes' seventh-round pick went to the Vancouver Canucks as the result of a trade on June 27, 2009, that sent Shaun Heshka to Phoenix in exchange for this pick.
3. The Dallas Stars' seventh-round pick went to the San Jose Sharks as the result of a trade on June 27, 2009, that sent a sixth-round pick in 2010 to Dallas in exchange for this pick.
4. The Edmonton Oilers' seventh-round pick went to the Ottawa Senators as the result of a trade on June 27, 2009, that sent a sixth-round pick in 2010 to Edmonton in exchange for this pick.
5. The Florida Panthers' seventh-round pick went to the Chicago Blackhawks as the result of a trade on January 10, 2008, that sent Magnus Johansson to Florida for this pick.
6. The Anaheim Ducks' seventh-round pick went to the Philadelphia Flyers as the result of a trade on June 21, 2008, that sent a seventh-round pick in 2008 to Anaheim in exchange for this pick.
7. The St. Louis Blues' seventh-round pick went to the Los Angeles Kings as the result of a trade on June 21, 2008, that sent a seventh-round pick in 2008 to St. Louis in exchange for this pick.
8. The Philadelphia Flyers' seventh-round pick went to the St. Louis Blues as the result of a trade on June 27, 2009, that sent a seventh-round pick in 2010 to the Nashville Predators in exchange for this pick.
  Nashville previously acquired this pick as the result of a trade on June 24, 2008, that sent Janne Niskala to Philadelphia in exchange for Triston Grant and this pick.
9. The Vancouver Canucks' seventh-round pick went to the Los Angeles Kings as the result of a trade on December 30, 2008, that sent Jason LaBarbera to Vancouver for this pick.
10. The Pittsburgh Penguins' seventh-round pick went to the Montreal Canadiens as the result of a trade on June 27, 2009, that sent a sixth-round pick in 2010 to Pittsburgh in exchange for this pick.

== Draftees based on nationality ==
Rank	Country	Picks	Percent	Top selection
	North America	157	74.8%	
1	Canada	104	49.5%	John Tavares, 1st
2	United States	53	25.2%	Nick Leddy, 16th
	Europe	53	25.2%	
3	Sweden	24	11.4%	Victor Hedman, 2nd
4	Finland	10	4.8%	Mikko Koskinen, 31st
5	Russia	7	3.3%	Dmitri Kulikov, 14th
6	Slovakia	5	2.4%	Richard Panik, 52nd
7	Czech Republic	3	1.4%	Andrej Nestrasil, 75th
8	Belarus	1	0.5%	Kirill Gotovets, 183rd
8	Denmark	1	0.5%	Oliver Lauridsen, 196th
8	Germany	1	0.5%	Dominik Bielke, 207th
8	Italy	1	0.5%	Thomas Larkin, 137th

== North American draftees by state/province ==
Rank	State/Province	Selections	Top selection
1	Ontario	49	John Tavares, 1st
2	Quebec	20	Louis Leblanc, 18th
3	Minnesota	14	Nick Leddy, 16th
4	British Columbia	13	Evander Kane, 4th
5	Alberta	11	Dylan Olsen, 28th
6	Saskatchewan	9	Brayden Schenn, 5th
7	New York	6	Jeremy Morin, 45th
8	Massachusetts	5	Chris Kreider, 19th
9	New Jersey	4	Kyle Palmieri, 26th
10	Manitoba	3	Scott Glennie, 8th
10	Illinois	3	John Moore, 21st
12	Texas	2	Chris Brown, 36th
12	Wisconsin	2	Craig Smith, 98th
12	California	2	Kyle Bigos, 99th
12	Pennsylvania	2	Patrick Wey, 115th
12	Nova Scotia	2	Ashton Bernard, 174th
12	Connecticut	2	Michael Chichy, 199th
18	Alaska	1	William Wrenn, 43rd
18	Colorado	1	Drew Shore, 44th
18	Michigan	1	Kenny Ryan, 50th
18	Maine	1	Brian Dumoulin, 51st
18	Rhode Island	1	Mac Bennett, 79th
18	Missouri	1	Chris Wideman, 100th
18	Alabama	1	Nic Dowd, 198th

== See also ==
- 2008–09 NHL season
- 2009–10 NHL season
- 2007–08 NHL transactions
- 2008–09 NHL transactions
- List of NHL first overall draft choices
- List of NHL players
