= Petteri Similä =

Finnish ice hockey player

- Born: April 9, 1990 (age 36) Oulu, Finland
- Height: 6 ft 5 in (196 cm)
- Weight: 190 lb (86 kg; 13 st 8 lb)
- Position: Goaltender
- Caught: Right
- Played for: KalPa
- NHL draft: 211th overall, 2009; Montreal Canadiens
- Playing career: 2010–2016

Petteri Similä (born April 9, 1990) is a Finnish former professional ice hockey goaltender who played a single game in the Liiga for KalPa. He was selected in the seventh round, 211th overall, by the Montreal Canadiens in the 2009 NHL entry draft.

On December 12,2010, Simila played 25.1 minutes of a game in the SM-liiga with KalPa.

== Career statistics ==
=== International ===
Year	Team	Event	Result	GP	W	L	OT	MIN	GA	SO	GAA	SV%
2010	Finland	WJC	5th	2	0	0	0	40	9	0	7.50	.736
Junior totals				2	0	0	0	40	9	0	7.50	.736
