= Nick Tarnasky =

Canadian ice hockey player (born 1984)

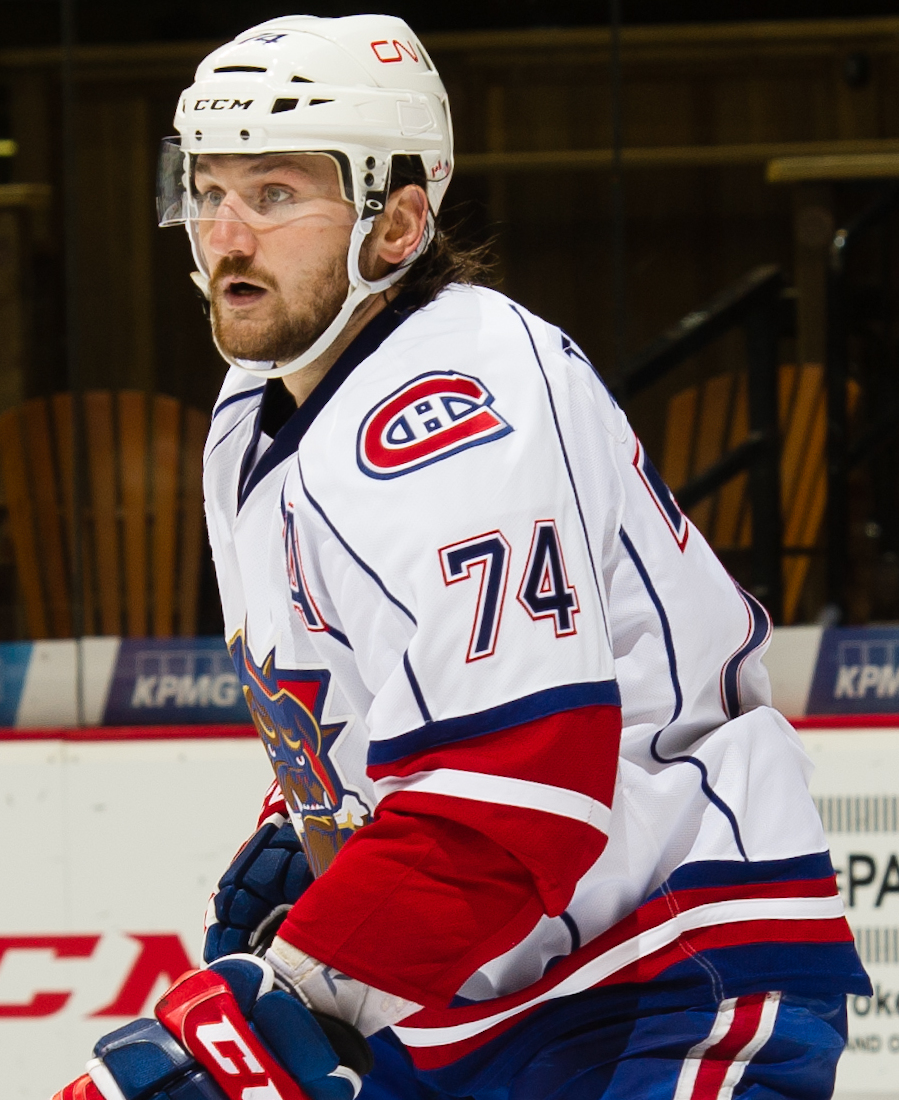
- Tarnasky with the Hamilton Bulldogs in 2013
- Born: November 25, 1984 (age 41) Rocky Mountain House, Alberta, Canada
- Height: 6 ft 2 in (188 cm)
- Weight: 224 lb (102 kg; 16 st 0 lb)
- Position: Centre
- Shot: Left
- Played for: Tampa Bay Lightning; Nashville Predators; Florida Panthers; Vityaz Chekhov
- NHL draft: 287th overall, 2003; Tampa Bay Lightning
- Playing career: 2005–2017

Nick Tarnasky (born November 25, 1984) is a Canadian former professional ice hockey centre. He most recently played for the San Diego Gulls of the American Hockey League (AHL) during the 2016–17 season. Tarnasky previously played in the National Hockey League (NHL) with the Tampa Bay Lightning, Nashville Predators and the Florida Panthers.

== Playing career ==
Tarnasky was drafted in the ninth round, 287th overall, by the Tampa Bay Lightning in the 2003 NHL entry draft. He made his NHL debut in the 2005-06 season for the Lightning, and would also play the following two seasons with the team. On September 29, 2008, he was traded to the Nashville Predators in exchange for a conditional sixth-round pick in the 2009 NHL entry draft. On November 27, 2008, he was traded to the Florida Panthers in exchange for Wade Belak. Tarnasky was released by the Panthers in 2010.

In 2010, Tarnasky attended training camp with the defending Stanley Cup champion Chicago Blackhawks. After being cut, he signed with the Columbus Blue Jackets, who assigned him to their American Hockey League (AHL) affiliate, the Springfield Falcons. Tarnasky previously played with the Falcons from 2004 through 2006.

On July 3, 2011, Tarnasky signed with Vityaz Chekhov of the Kontinental Hockey League (KHL). During the 2011–12 season, he scored 4 goals in 36 games.

On July 17, 2012, Tarnasky returned to North America to sign a one-year, two-way contract with the Buffalo Sabres. He was assigned to the club's AHL affiliate, the Rochester Americans, for the duration of the 2012–13 season.

On July 6, 2013, Tarnasky left the Sabres as a free agent to sign a one-year contract with the Montreal Canadiens. He was assigned to the club's AHL affiliate, the Hamilton Bulldogs for the duration of the 2013–14 season.

On July 3, 2014, Tarnasky signed a two-year, two-way contract with the New York Rangers.

After two seasons with the Rangers' AHL affiliate, the Hartford Wolf Pack, Tarnasky left at the conclusion of the 2015–16 season as a free agent. On September 8, 2016, he signed a one-year contract with the AHL's San Diego Gulls.

== Post-career ==
Tarnasky took on coaching role after playing in the AHL. As of 2025, he is coaching the U17 Red Deer AAA North Stars.

In July 2025, a video recording of Tarnasky engaging in a physical altercation on Alberta Springs Golf Resort outside Red Deer, Alberta with another golfer was posted on the internet. The video went viral gaining tens of millions of views on various social media sites. The RCMP conducted an investigation into the altercation, finding no probable cause to charge Tarnasky. The other man in the altercation later apologized, saying he "played 36 holes of golf, drank way too much and my mouth ran faster than my brain." Tarnasky was additionally cleared to resume coaching.

== Career statistics ==
			Regular season					Playoffs
Season	Team	League	GP	G	A	Pts	PIM	GP	G	A	Pts	PIM
2000–01	Leduc Oil Kings AAA	AMHL	35	39	29	68	95	—	—	—	—	—
2000–01	Prince Albert Raiders	WHL	2	0	0	0	4	—	—	—	—	—
2001–02	Delta Ice Hawks	PIJHL	1	1	1	2	0	—	—	—	—	—
2001–02	Drayton Valley Thunder	AJHL	20	7	4	11	10	—	—	—	—	—
2001–02	Vancouver Giants	WHL	10	1	0	1	5	—	—	—	—	—
2002–03	Kelowna Rockets	WHL	39	4	12	16	39	—	—	—	—	—
2002–03	Lethbridge Hurricanes	WHL	30	5	8	13	45	—	—	—	—	—
2003–04	Lethbridge Hurricanes	WHL	71	26	23	49	108	—	—	—	—	—
2004–05	Springfield Falcons	AHL	80	7	10	17	176	—	—	—	—	—
2005–06	Springfield Falcons	AHL	68	14	9	23	100	—	—	—	—	—
2005–06	Tampa Bay Lightning	NHL	12	0	1	1	4	—	—	—	—	—
2006–07	Tampa Bay Lightning	NHL	77	5	4	9	80	6	0	0	0	10
2007–08	Tampa Bay Lightning	NHL	80	6	4	10	78	—	—	—	—	—
2008–09	Nashville Predators	NHL	11	0	1	1	17	—	—	—	—	—
2008–09	Florida Panthers	NHL	34	1	5	6	33	—	—	—	—	—
2009–10	Florida Panthers	NHL	31	1	2	3	85	—	—	—	—	—
2009–10	Rochester Americans	AHL	5	3	0	3	7	—	—	—	—	—
2010–11	Florida Everblades	ECHL	3	1	2	3	0	—	—	—	—	—
2010–11	Springfield Falcons	AHL	66	7	13	20	150	—	—	—	—	—
2011–12	Vityaz Chekhov	KHL	36	5	7	12	173	—	—	—	—	—
2012–13	Rochester Americans	AHL	74	16	10	26	138	3	1	0	1	4
2013–14	Hamilton Bulldogs	AHL	76	13	9	22	144	—	—	—	—	—
2014–15	Hartford Wolf Pack	AHL	26	1	4	5	36	—	—	—	—	—
2015–16	Hartford Wolf Pack	AHL	59	15	5	20	77	—	—	—	—	—
2016–17	San Diego Gulls	AHL	32	4	5	9	53	—	—	—	—	—
AHL totals			486	80	65	145	881	3	1	0	1	4
NHL totals			245	13	17	30	297	6	0	0	0	10
