= Richard Petiot =

Canadian ice hockey player

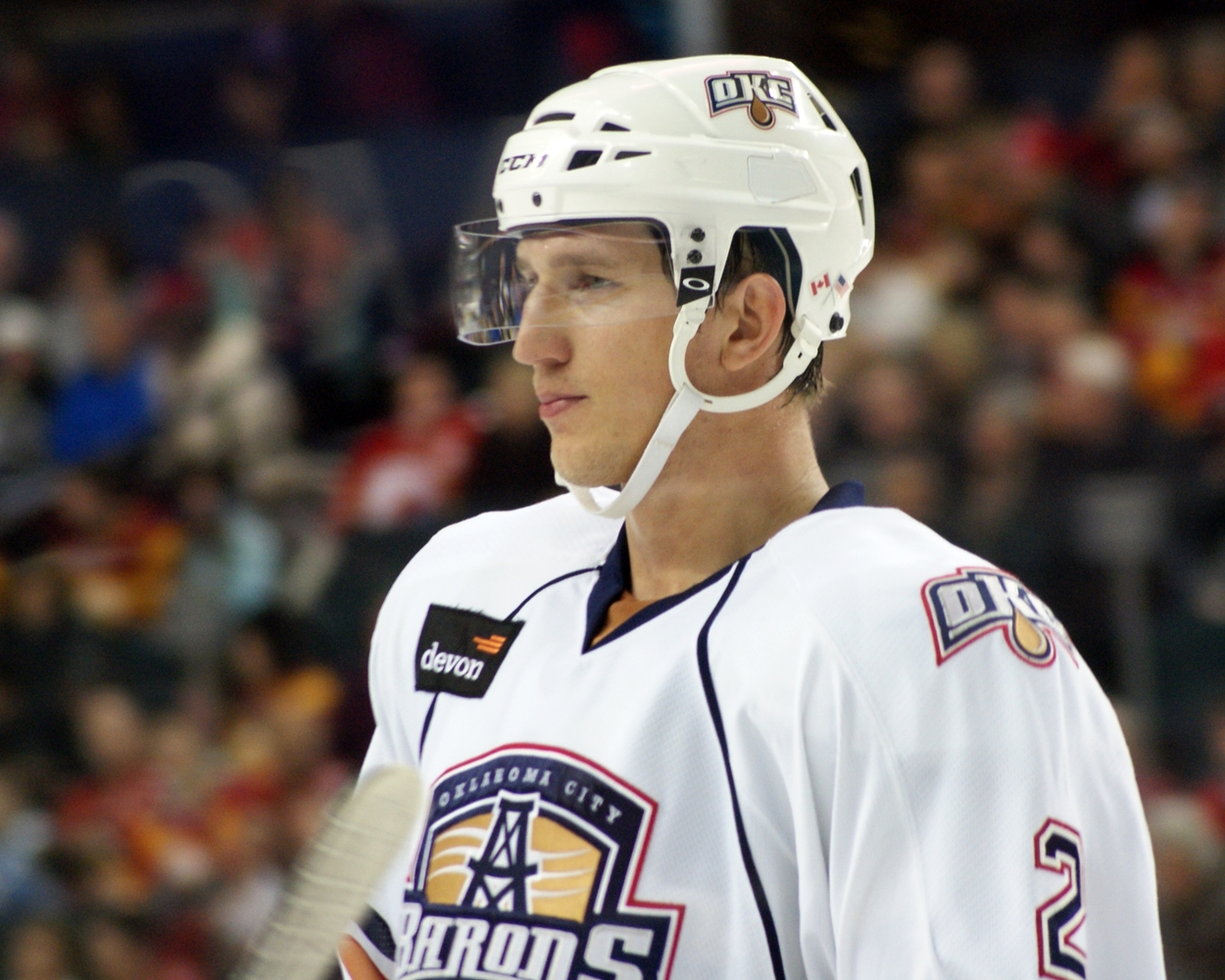
- 2010–11 Oklahoma City Barons
- Born: August 20, 1982 (age 44) Daysland, Alberta, Canada
- Height: 6 ft 3 in (191 cm)
- Weight: 215 lb (98 kg; 15 st 5 lb)
- Position: Defence
- Shot: Left
- Played for: Los Angeles Kings; Tampa Bay Lightning; Edmonton Oilers
- NHL draft: 116th overall, 2001; Los Angeles Kings
- Playing career: 2005–2013

Richard Allan Petiot (born August 20, 1982) is a Canadian former professional ice hockey defenceman. He was drafted by the Los Angeles Kings in the fourth round (116th overall) of the 2001 NHL entry draft.

== Playing career ==
The Los Angeles Kings drafted Petiot in 2001 from the Camrose Kodiaks of the AJHL. He then played four years of collegiate hockey with Colorado College. Petiot signed a two-year contract with the Kings after his senior year with the Tigers on August 11, 2005.

Petiot made his professional debut in the 2005–06 season, playing mostly with Kings affiliate, the Manchester Monarchs. Petiot spent the next two injury-plagued seasons with the Monarchs before signing as a free agent for the Toronto Maple Leafs on July 15, 2008.

In the 2008–09 season, the Leafs assigned Petiot to their affiliate, the Toronto Marlies, then traded him to the Tampa Bay Lightning for Olaf Kolzig, Andy Rogers, Jamie Heward and a fourth round selection on March 4, 2009.

On July 9, 2009, he was signed as a free agent by the Chicago Blackhawks.

On July 2, 2010, he was signed as a free agent with the Edmonton Oilers to a one-year contract. During the 2010–11 season, Petiot was called up from the Oklahoma City Barons to replace an injured Theo Peckham on March 1, 2011.

On July 2, 2011, Petiot was signed by his former team, Tampa Bay, to a one-year, two-way contract. Petiot was limited to only 6 games during the 2011–12 season with affiliate, the Norfolk Admirals, due to injury.

With the NHL lockout affecting his status as a free agent, Petiot waited until the conclusion of the dispute before signing a professional try-out contract with the St. John's IceCaps of the AHL on January 9, 2013.

== Career statistics ==
| | | | Regular season | | | | | Playoffs |
| Season | Team | League | GP | G | A | Pts | PIM | GP | G | A | Pts | PIM |
|---|---|---|---|---|---|---|---|---|---|---|---|---|
| 2000–01 | Camrose Kodiaks | AJHL | 55 | 8 | 16 | 24 | 81 | 8 | 2 | 1 | 3 | 8 |
| 2001–02 | Colorado College | WCHA | 39 | 4 | 6 | 10 | 35 | — | — | — | — | — |
| 2002–03 | Colorado College | WCHA | 38 | 1 | 6 | 7 | 86 | — | — | — | — | — |
| 2003–04 | Colorado College | WCHA | 39 | 3 | 5 | 8 | 61 | — | — | — | — | — |
| 2004–05 | Colorado College | WCHA | 25 | 3 | 5 | 8 | 38 | — | — | — | — | — |
| 2005–06 | Los Angeles Kings | NHL | 2 | 0 | 0 | 0 | 2 | — | — | — | — | — |
| 2005–06 | Manchester Monarchs | AHL | 63 | 4 | 10 | 14 | 52 | 7 | 1 | 0 | 1 | 6 |
| 2006–07 | Manchester Monarchs | AHL | 13 | 1 | 1 | 2 | 25 | 2 | 0 | 0 | 0 | 2 |
| 2007–08 | Manchester Monarchs | AHL | 40 | 2 | 5 | 7 | 56 | — | — | — | — | — |
| 2008–09 | Toronto Marlies | AHL | 45 | 3 | 11 | 14 | 59 | — | — | — | — | — |
| 2008–09 | Norfolk Admirals | AHL | 1 | 0 | 0 | 0 | 0 | — | — | — | — | — |
| 2008–09 | Tampa Bay Lightning | NHL | 11 | 0 | 3 | 3 | 21 | — | — | — | — | — |
| 2009–10 | Rockford IceHogs | AHL | 80 | 8 | 29 | 37 | 88 | 4 | 0 | 0 | 0 | 4 |
| 2010–11 | Edmonton Oilers | NHL | 2 | 0 | 0 | 0 | 2 | — | — | — | — | — |
| 2010–11 | Oklahoma City Barons | AHL | 66 | 0 | 15 | 15 | 52 | 6 | 0 | 0 | 0 | 4 |
| 2011–12 | Norfolk Admirals | AHL | 6 | 0 | 0 | 0 | 7 | — | — | — | — | — |
| 2012–13 | St. John's IceCaps | AHL | 24 | 1 | 2 | 3 | 22 | — | — | — | — | — |
| AHL totals | | | 338 | 19 | 73 | 92 | 361 | 19 | 1 | 0 | 1 | 16 |
| NHL totals | | | 15 | 0 | 3 | 3 | 25 | — | — | — | — | — |
