= Jonas Frögren =

Swedish ice hockey player

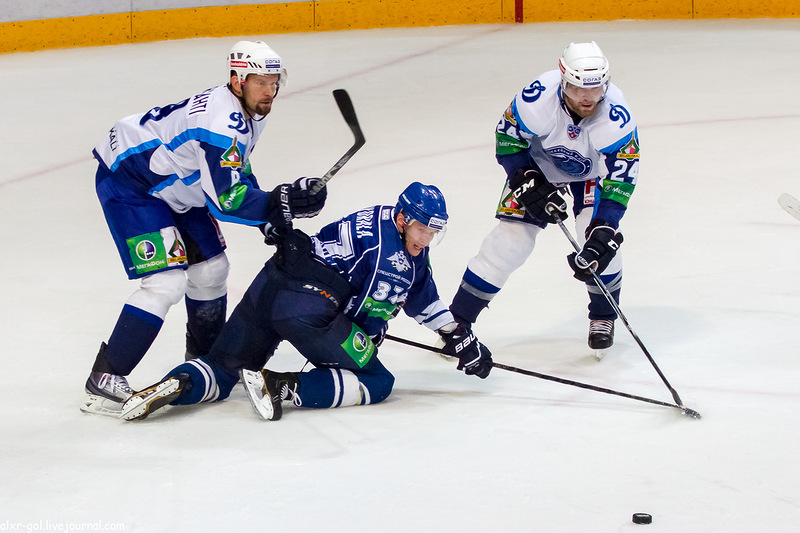
- Born: August 28, 1980 (age 45) Falun, Sweden
- Height: 6 ft 2 in (188 cm)
- Weight: 220 lb (100 kg; 15 st 10 lb)
- Position: Defence
- Shot: Left
- Played for: Färjestads BK; Toronto Maple Leafs; HC Dinamo Minsk; Atlant Moscow Oblast; Skellefteå AIK; Leksands IF
- National team: Sweden
- NHL draft: 206th overall, 1998; Calgary Flames
- Playing career: 2000–2016

Jonas Frögren (born August 28, 1980) is a Swedish former professional ice hockey player who last played for Leksands IF in the Swedish Swedish Hockey League (SHL).

== Playing career ==
Frögren was drafted by the Calgary Flames in the 1998 NHL entry draft in the 8th round as the 206th pick overall.

Frögren came to Färjestads BK as a junior in the mid-1990s and played seven seasons with Färjestads BK, having won two Swedish Championships and four Swedish Championship silver medals.

On July 9, 2008, Frögren signed a two-year contract with the Toronto Maple Leafs of the NHL. However, the contract Frögren signed was rejected by the NHL due to a dispute over his status. While the League believed he was an entry-level player (as he was drafted by the Calgary Flames in 1998 but did not sign with them), the Leafs and Frögren's agent, Don Meehan, believed he was an unrestricted free agent, thus signing him to a contract worth more than the $875,000 limit that was mandated by the NHL for entry-level players.

Frögren scored his first NHL goal on December 20, 2008, against Marc-André Fleury of the Pittsburgh Penguins.

On April 1, 2009, the NHL decided on the discipline of the handling of Frögren's contract. The Maple Leafs were fined $500,000 for paying Frögren the original contract, which included a $755,000 signing bonus. It is believed that Frögren used approximately $400,000 of his signing bonus to get out of the final year of his contract with Färjestad. The Maple Leafs were also forced to forfeit their 2009 fourth-round draft pick (previously acquired from the Carolina Hurricanes via the Tampa Bay Lightning at the 2009 NHL Trade Deadline). Neither Frögren's salary nor contractual status were affected by the NHL's decision.

On April 21, 2010, Frögren returned to Färjestads BK signing a four-year contract. Upon completion of the second year of his contract with Färjestads, Frogen sought a release from his contract to join the Kontinental Hockey League with HC Dinamo Minsk and Atlant Moscow Oblast in the 2012–13 season.

After returning to Sweden and playing the 2013–14 season with Skellefteå AIK, and providing a veteran presence on the Blueline in claiming the Championship, Frogren left as a free agent to be closer to family in signing a one-year contract in Leksands IF on May 9, 2014. Frogren announced his retirement from active play on April 27, 2016, as Captain of Leksands IF.

== Awards ==
- Swedish Champion with Färjestads BK in 2002, 2006, and 2011 and with Skellefteå AIK in 2014.

== Career statistics ==
=== Regular season and playoffs ===
			Regular season					Playoffs
Season	Team	League	GP	G	A	Pts	PIM	GP	G	A	Pts	PIM
1998–99	Färjestads BK	SEL	22	0	0	0	2	—	—	—	—	—
1999–00	Bofors IK	Allsv	43	2	7	9	40	—	—	—	—	—
2000–01	Färjestads BK	SEL	49	3	0	3	10	16	0	0	0	4
2001–02	Färjestads BK	SEL	50	3	6	9	18	10	0	0	0	4
2002–03	Färjestads BK	SEL	50	1	7	8	48	14	0	0	0	16
2003–04	Färjestads BK	SEL	47	5	5	10	38	17	2	0	2	6
2004–05	Färjestads BK	SEL	34	1	0	1	26	15	0	2	2	2
2005–06	Färjestads BK	SEL	46	3	3	6	84	17	1	1	2	6
2006–07	Färjestads BK	SEL	53	4	4	8	40	7	1	0	1	0
2007–08	Färjestads BK	SEL	47	0	1	1	38	12	0	1	1	12
2008–09	Toronto Maple Leafs	NHL	41	1	6	7	28	—	—	—	—	—
2008–09	Toronto Marlies	AHL	—	—	—	—	—	3	0	0	0	0
2009–10	Toronto Marlies	AHL	56	3	8	11	41	—	—	—	—	—
2010–11	Färjestads BK	SEL	43	0	2	2	53	14	0	3	3	8
2011–12	Färjestads BK	SEL	33	0	0	0	47	10	0	0	0	10
2012–13	HC Dinamo Minsk	KHL	8	0	3	3	6	—	—	—	—	—
2012–13	Atlant Moscow Oblast	KHL	25	0	2	2	28	2	0	0	0	2
2013–14	Skellefteå AIK	SHL	50	3	7	10	30	13	0	2	2	8
2014–15	Leksands IF	SHL	53	0	1	1	57	—	—	—	—	—
2015–16	Leksands IF	Allsv	35	0	3	3	28	14	0	1	1	8
2016–17	Ludvika HF	Div.2	1	0	0	0	2	—	—	—	—	—
SHL totals			577	23	36	59	491	145	4	9	13	76
NHL totals			41	1	6	7	28	—	—	—	—	—

=== International ===
Year	Team	Event	Result	GP	G	A	Pts	PIM
1998	Sweden	EJC	1st place, gold medalist(s)	6	0	3	3	0
2000	Sweden	WJC	5th	7	0	2	2	6
2008	Sweden	WC	4th	9	0	3	3	8
Junior totals				13	0	5	5	6
Senior totals				9	0	3	3	8
