= List of Tampa Bay Lightning draft picks =

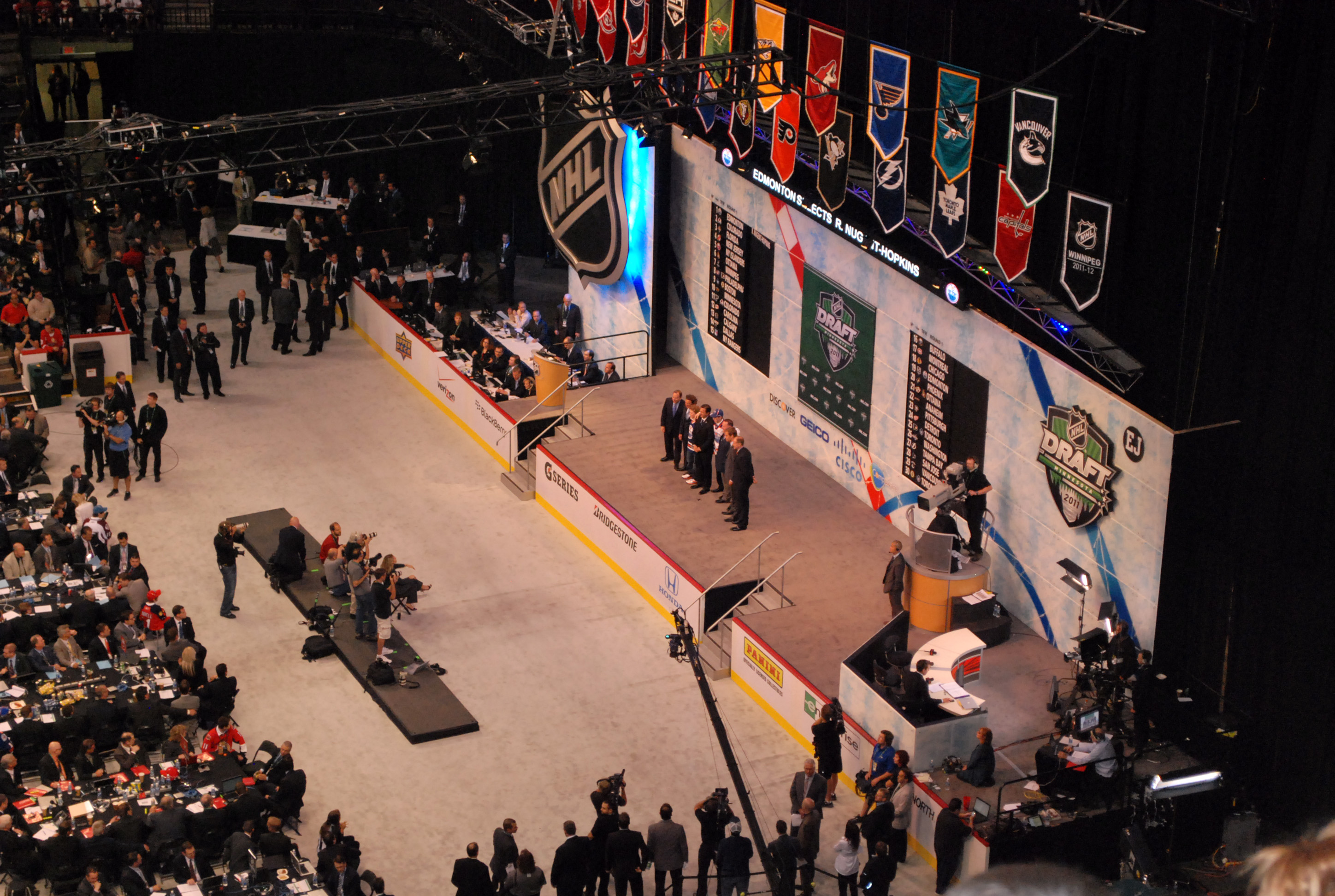
At the 2011 NHL entry draft the Lightning's first selection was 27th overall.

The Tampa Bay Lightning are a professional ice hockey team based in Tampa, Florida. They are members of the Atlantic Division of the Eastern Conference of the National Hockey League (NHL). The first entry draft they participated in was in 1992, where they selected Roman Hamrlik first overall. Since 1992, they have drafted 190 players from 13 different nations.

The NHL entry draft is held each June, allowing teams to select players who have turned 18 years old by September 15 in the year the draft is held. The draft order is determined by the previous season's order of finish, with non-playoff teams drafting first, followed by the teams that made the playoffs, with the specific order determined by the number of points earned by each team. The NHL holds a weighted lottery for the 14 non-playoff teams, allowing the winner to move up a maximum of four positions in the entry draft. The team with the fewest points has the best chance of winning the lottery, with each successive team given a lower chance of moving up in the draft. Between 1986 and 1994, the NHL also held a Supplemental Draft for players in American colleges.

The Lightning have held the first overall pick three times in franchise history. They have used these picks to select Roman Hamrlik in 1992, Vincent Lecavalier in 1998 and Steven Stamkos in 2008. They also selected first in the 1992 NHL Supplemental Draft, where they chose defenseman Cory Cross. When they won the Stanley Cup in 2003–04, only five of the 25 who dressed for Game 7 were drafted by Tampa Bay. When the Lightning won their second Stanley Cup in 2020, the roster consisted of considerably more Lightning draft picks. That roster had 12 Lightning draft picks and 3 undrafted players that developed in their system.

== Key ==
Positions
G	Goaltender	C	Center
D	Defenseman	LW	Left wing
RW	Right wing	F	Forward

Statistics
GP	Games played	G	Goals
A	Assists	Pts	Points
PIM	Penalties in minutes	GAA	Goals against average
W	Wins	L	Losses
T	Ties	OT	Overtime/Shootout losses

Statistics are complete as of the 2025–26 NHL season and show each player's career regular season totals in the NHL. Wins, losses, ties, overtime losses and goals against average apply to goaltenders and are used only for players at that position.

== First round picks ==
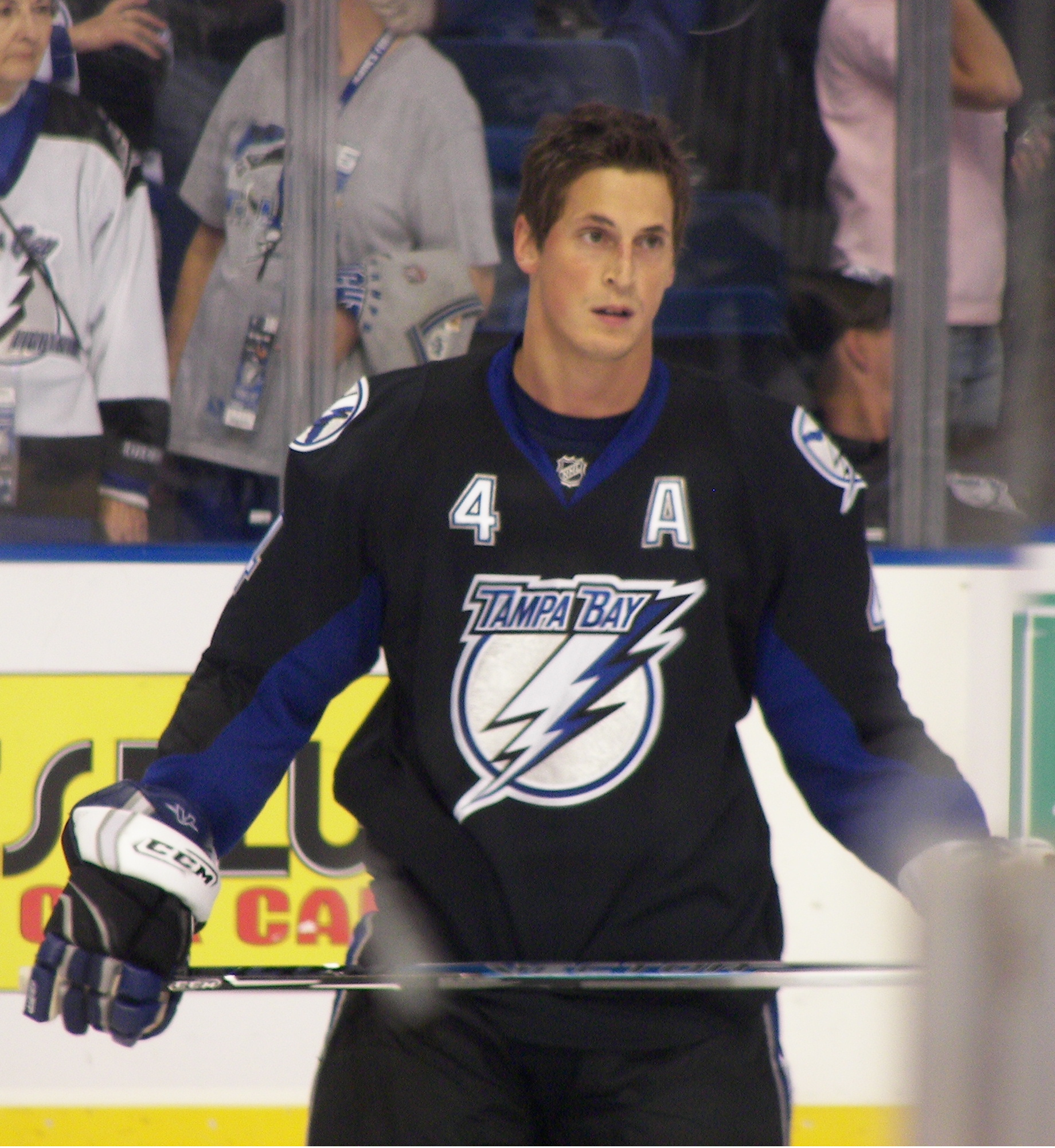
Vincent Lecavalier was the first overall pick in 1998.

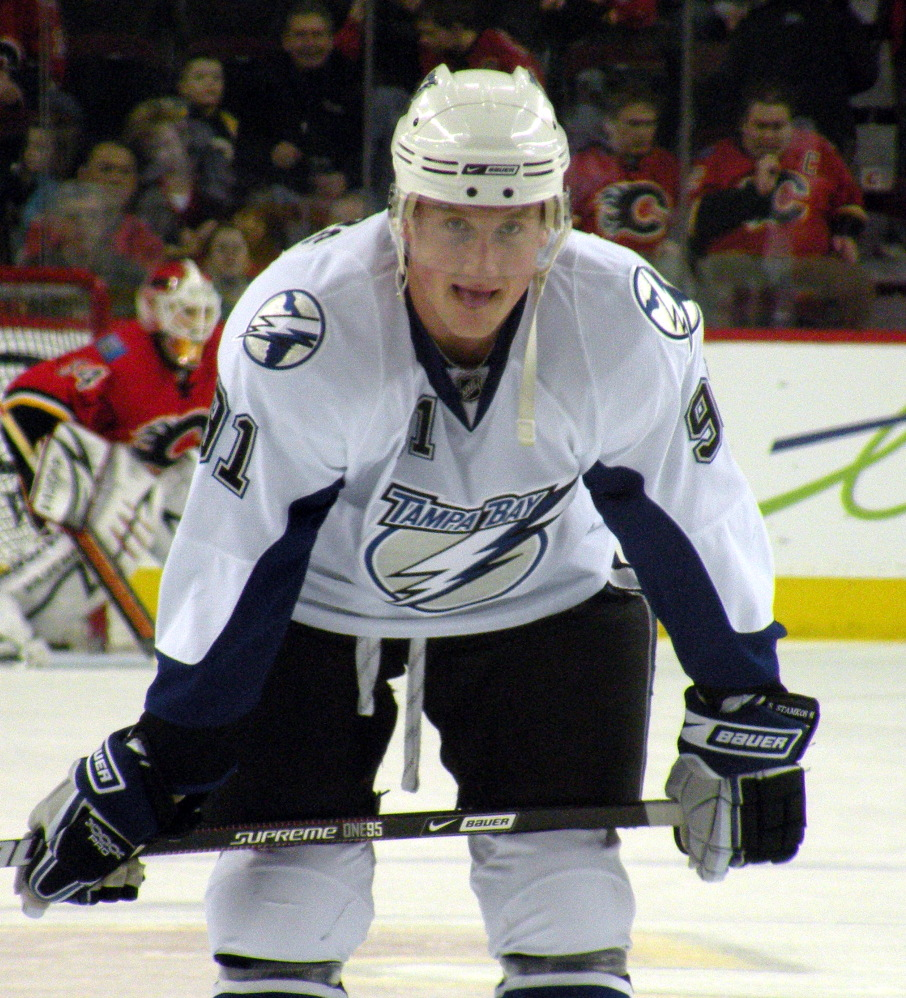
The Lightning selected Steven Stamkos first overall in 2008.

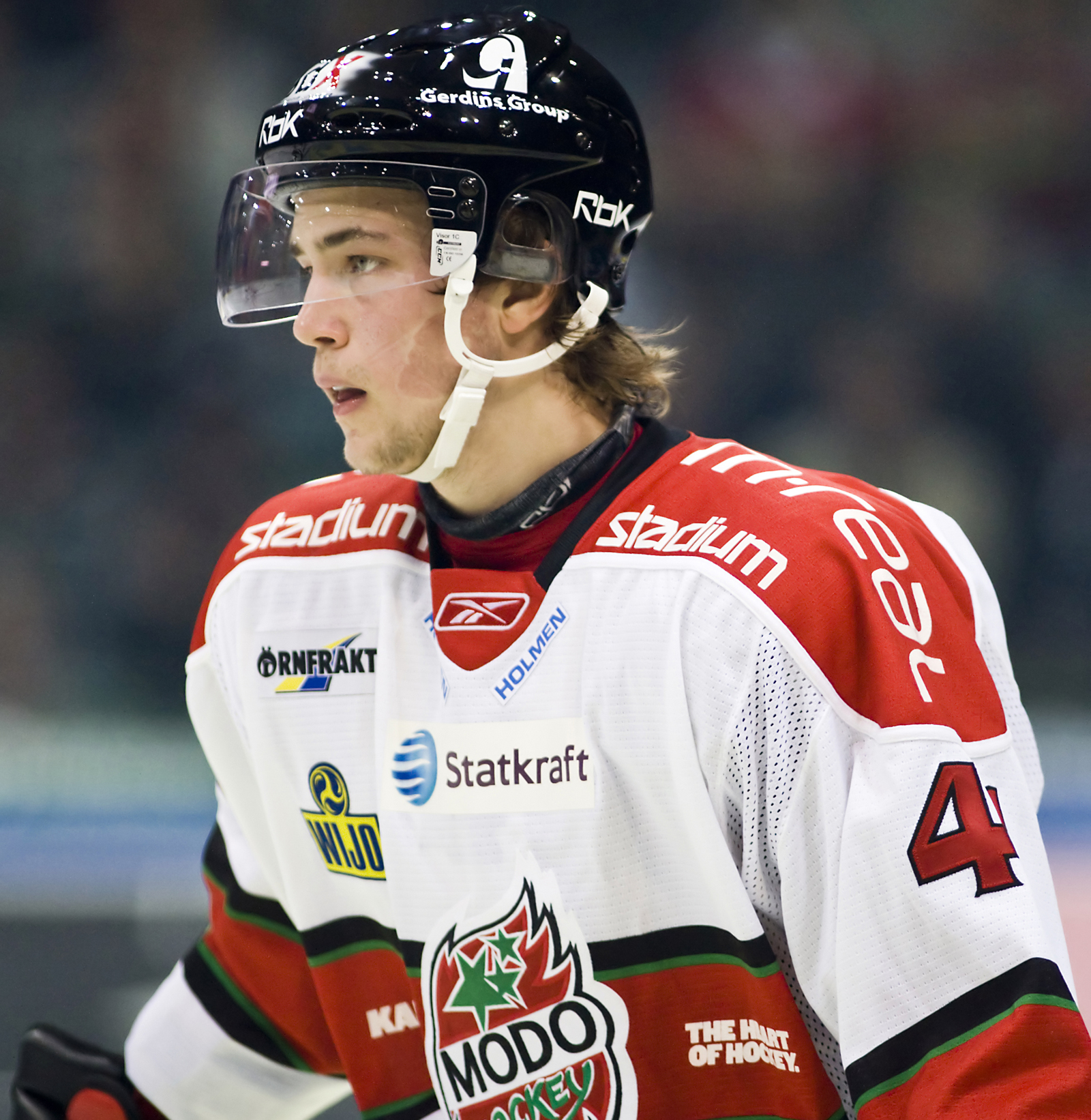
Victor Hedman was drafted second overall in 2009.

Year	Overall	Player	Nationality	Club team
1992	1	Roman Hamrlik	Czech Republic	Zlin ZPS AC (Czech)
1993	3	Chris Gratton	Canada	Kingston Frontenacs (OHL)
1994	8	Jason Wiemer	Canada	Portland Winterhawks (WHL)
1995	5	Daymond Langkow	Canada	Tri-City Americans (WHL)
1996	16	Mario Larocque	Canada	Hull Olympiques (QMJHL)
1997	7	Paul Mara	United States	Sudbury Wolves (OHL)
1998	1	Vincent Lecavalier	Canada	Rimouski Oceanic (QMJHL)
2000	8	Nikita Alexeev	Russia	Erie Otters (OHL)
2001	3	Alexander Svitov	Russia	Avangard Omsk (RSL)
2004	30	Andy Rogers	Canada	Calgary Hitmen (WHL)
2005	30	Vladimir Mihalik	Slovakia	Red Deer Rebels (WHL)
2006	15	Riku Helenius	Finland	Ilves (SM-l)
2008	1	Steven Stamkos	Canada	Sarnia Sting (OHL)
2009	2	Victor Hedman	Sweden	Modo Hockey (SEL)
2009	29	Carter Ashton	Canada	Lethbridge Hurricanes (WHL)
2010	6	Brett Connolly	Canada	Prince George Cougars (WHL)
2011	27	Vladislav Namestnikov	Russia	London Knights (OHL)
2012	10	Slater Koekkoek	Canada	Peterborough Petes (OHL)
2012	19	Andrei Vasilevskiy	Russia	Tolpar Ufa (MHL)
2013	3	Jonathan Drouin	Canada	Halifax Mooseheads (QMJHL)
2014	19	Tony DeAngelo	United States	Sarnia Sting (OHL)
2016	27	Brett Howden	Canada	Moose Jaw Warriors (WHL)
2017	14	Cal Foote	Canada	Kelowna Rockets (WHL)
2019	27	Nolan Foote	Canada	Kelowna Rockets (WHL)
2022	31	Isaac Howard	United States	U.S. National Team Development Program (USHL)

== Supplemental Draft picks ==
Year	Overall	Player	Nationality	Position	Club team	GP	G	A	Pts	PIM	W	L	T	OT	GAA	Notes
1992	1	Cory Cross	(Canada)	D	University of Alberta (CWUAA)	659	34	97	131	684	—	—	—	—	—	
1993	3	Brent Peterson	(Canada)	LW	Michigan Technological University (WCHA)	56	9	1	10	6	—	—	—	—	—	
1994	8	Francois Bouchard	(Canada)	D	Northeastern University (Hockey East)	—	—	—	—	—	—	—	—	—	—	

== 1992 Draft picks ==
Tampa Bay's draft picks at the 1992 NHL entry draft held on June 20, 1992, at the Montreal Forum in Montreal.

Round	Overall	Player	Nationality	Position	Club team	GP	G	A	Pts	PIM	W	L	T	OT	GAA	Notes
1	1	Roman Hamrlik	(Czech Republic)	D	Zlín ZPS AC (Czech)	1395	155	483	683	1408	—	—	—	—	—	
2	26	Drew Bannister	(Canada)	D	Sault Ste. Marie Greyhounds (OHL)	164	5	25	30	161	—	—	—	—	—	
3	49	Brent Gretzky	(Canada)	C	Belleville Bulls (OHL)	13	1	3	4	2	—	—	—	—	—	
4	74	Aaron Gavey	(Canada)	C	Sault Ste. Marie Greyhounds (OHL)	360	41	50	91	272	—	—	—	—	—	
6	122	Martin Tanguay	(Canada)	LW	Verdun Collège Français (QMJHL)	—	—	—	—	—	—	—	—	—	—	
7	145	Derek Wilkinson	(Canada)	G	Detroit Compuware Ambassadors (OHL)	22	0	0	0	2	3	12	3	—	3.67	
8	170	Dennis Maxwell	(United States)	LW	Niagara Falls Thunder (OHL)	—	—	—	—	—	—	—	—	—	—	
9	193	Andrew Kemper	(Canada)	D	Seattle Thunderbirds (WHL)	—	—	—	—	—	—	—	—	—	—	
10	218	Marc Tardif	(Canada)	LW	Shawinigan Cataractes (QMJHL)	—	—	—	—	—	—	—	—	—	—	
11	241	Tom MacDonald	(Canada)	D	Sault Ste. Marie Greyhounds (OHL)	—	—	—	—	—	—	—	—	—	—	

== 1993 Draft picks ==
Tampa Bay's draft picks at the 1993 NHL entry draft held on June 26, 1993, at the Colisée de Québec in Quebec City, Quebec.

Round	Overall	Player	Nationality	Position	Club team	GP	G	A	Pts	PIM	W	L	T	OT	GAA	Notes
1	3	Chris Gratton	(Canada)	C	Kingston Frontenacs (OHL)	1092	214	354	568	1638	—	—	—	—	—	
2	29	Tyler Moss	(Canada)	G	Kingston Frontenacs (OHL)	30	0	1	1	0	6	16	1	—	3.25	
3	55	Allan Egeland	(Canada)	C	Tacoma Rockets (WHL)	17	0	0	0	16	—	—	—	—	—	
4	81	Marian Kacir	(Czech Republic)	RW	Owen Sound Platers (OHL)	—	—	—	—	—	—	—	—	—	—	
5	107	Ryan Brown	(Canada)	D	Swift Current Broncos (WHL)	—	—	—	—	—	—	—	—	—	—	
6	133	Kiley Hill	(Canada)	LW	Sault Ste. Marie Greyhounds (OHL)	—	—	—	—	—	—	—	—	—	—	
7	159	Mathieu Raby	(Canada)	D	Victoriaville Tigres (QMJHL)	—	—	—	—	—	—	—	—	—	—	
8	185	Ryan Nauss	(Canada)	LW	Peterborough Petes (OHL)	—	—	—	—	—	—	—	—	—	—	
9	211	Alexandre Laporte	(Canada)	D	Victoriaville Tigres (QMJHL)	—	—	—	—	—	—	—	—	—	—	
10	237	Brett Ducan	(Canada)	D	Seattle Thunderbirds (WHL)	—	—	—	—	—	—	—	—	—	—	
11	263	Mark Szoke	(Canada)	LW	Lethbridge Hurricanes (WHL)	—	—	—	—	—	—	—	—	—	—	

== 1994 Draft picks ==
Tampa Bay's draft picks at the 1994 NHL entry draft held on June 28 and 29, 1994, at the Hartford Civic Center in Hartford, Connecticut.

Round	Overall	Player	Nationality	Position	Club team	GP	G	A	Pts	PIM	W	L	T	OT	GAA	Notes
1	8	Jason Wiemer	(Canada)	C	Portland Winterhawks (WHL)	726	90	112	202	1420	—	—	—	—	—	
2	34	Colin Cloutier	(Canada)	C	Brandon Wheat Kings (WHL)	—	—	—	—	—	—	—	—	—	—	
3	55	Vadim Epanchintsev	(Russia)	C	Spartak Moscow (Rus)	—	—	—	—	—	—	—	—	—	—	
4	86	Dmitri Klevakin	(Russia)	RW	Spartak Moscow (Rus)	—	—	—	—	—	—	—	—	—	—	
6	137	Daniel Juden	(United States)	C	Governor Dummer Academy (ISL)	—	—	—	—	—	—	—	—	—	—	
6	138	Bryce Salvador	(Canada)	D	Lethbridge Hurricanes (WHL)	786	24	86	110	696	—	—	—	—	—	
7	164	Chris Maillet	(Canada)	D	Red Deer Rebels (WHL)	—	—	—	—	—	—	—	—	—	—	
8	190	Alexei Baranov	(Russia)	D	Dynamo Moscow (Rus)	—	—	—	—	—	—	—	—	—	—	
9	216	Yuri Smirnov	(Russia)	C	Spartak Moscow (Rus)	—	—	—	—	—	—	—	—	—	—	
10	242	Shawn Gervais	(Canada)	RW	Seattle Thunderbirds (WHL)	—	—	—	—	—	—	—	—	—	—	
10	268	Brian White	(United States)	D	Arlington Catholic High School (ISL)	2	0	0	0	0	—	—	—	—	—	

== 1995 Draft picks ==
Tampa Bay's draft picks at the 1995 NHL entry draft held on July 28, 1995, at Edmonton Coliseum in Edmonton, Alberta.

Round	Overall	Player	Nationality	Position	Club team	GP	G	A	Pts	PIM	W	L	T	OT	GAA	Notes
1	4	Daymond Langkow	(Canada)	C	Tri-City Americans (WHL)	1090	270	402	672	547	—	—	—	—	—	
2	30	Mike McBain	(Canada)	D	Red Deer Rebels (WHL)	64	0	7	7	22	—	—	—	—	—	
3	55	Shane Willis	(Canada)	LW	Prince Albert Raiders (WHL)	174	31	43	74	77	—	—	—	—	—	
5	108	Konstantin Golokhvastov	(Ukraine)	RW	Dynamo Moscow (Rus)	—	—	—	—	—	—	—	—	—	—	
6	134	Eduard Pershin	(Russia)	C	Dynamo Moscow (Rus)	—	—	—	—	—	—	—	—	—	—	
7	160	Cory Murphy	(Canada)	D	Sault Ste. Marie Greyhounds (OHL)	—	—	—	—	—	—	—	—	—	—	
8	186	Joe Cardelli	(Canada)	LW	Spokane Chiefs (WHL)	—	—	—	—	—	—	—	—	—	—	
9	212	Zac Bierk	(Canada)	G	Peterborough Petes (OHL)	47	0	1	1	6	9	20	5	—	3.18	

== 1996 Draft picks ==
Tampa Bay's draft picks from the 1996 NHL entry draft held on June 22, 1996, at the Kiel Center in St. Louis, Missouri.

Round	Overall	Player	Nationality	Position	Club team	GP	G	A	Pts	PIM	W	L	T	OT	GAA	Notes
1	16	Mario Larocque	(Canada)	D	Hull Olympiques (QMJHL)	5	0	0	0	16	—	—	—	—	—	
3	69	Curtis Tipler	(Canada)	RW	Regina Pats (WHL)	—	—	—	—	—	—	—	—	—	—	
5	125	Jason Robinson	(Canada)	D	Niagara Falls Thunder (OHL)	—	—	—	—	—	—	—	—	—	—	
6	152	Nikolai Ignatov	(Russia)	D	CSKA Moscow (Rus)	—	—	—	—	—	—	—	—	—	—	
6	157	Xavier Delisle	(Canada)	C	Granby Predateurs (QMJHL)	16	3	2	5	6	—	—	—	—	—	
7	179	Pavel Kubina	(Czech Republic)	D	HC Vitkovice (Czech)	970	110	276	386	1123	—	—	—	—	—	Stanley Cup — 2004

== 1997 Draft picks ==
Tampa Bay's draft picks from the 1997 NHL entry draft held on June 21, 1997, at the Pittsburgh Civic Arena in Pittsburgh, Pennsylvania.

Round	Overall	Player	Nationality	Position	Club team	GP	G	A	Pts	PIM	W	L	T	OT	GAA	Notes
1	7	Paul Mara	(United States)	D	Sudbury Wolves (OHL)	734	64	189	253	776	—	—	—	—	—	
2	33	Kyle Kos	(Canada)	D	Red Deer Rebels (WHL	—	—	—	—	—	—	—	—	—	—	
3	61	Matt Elich	(United States)	RW	Windsor Spitfires (OHL)	16	1	1	2	0	—	—	—	—	—	
5	108	Mark Thompson	(Canada)	D	Regina Pats (WHL)	—	—	—	—	—	—	—	—	—	—	
5	109	Jan Sulc	(Czech Republic)	C	HC Litvinov Jr. (Czech)	—	—	—	—	—	—	—	—	—	—	
5	112	Karel Betik	(Czech Republic)	D	Kelowna Rockets (WHL)	3	0	2	2	2	—	—	—	—	—	
6	153	Andrei Skopintsev	(Russia)	D	HC TPS (SM-liiga	40	2	4	6	32	—	—	—	—	—	
7	168	Justin Jack	(Canada)	RW	Kelowna Rockets (WHL)	—	—	—	—	—	—	—	—	—	—	
7	170	Eero Somervuori	(Finland)	RW	Jokerit (SM-liiga	—	—	—	—	—	—	—	—	—	—	
7	185	Samuel St. Pierre	(Canada)	RW	Victoriaville Tigres (QMJHL)	—	—	—	—	—	—	—	—	—	—	
8	198	Shawn Skolney	(Canada)	D	Seattle Thunderbirds (WHL)	—	—	—	—	—	—	—	—	—	—	
9	224	Paul Comrie	(Canada)	C	University of Denver (WCHA)	15	1	2	3	4	—	—	—	—	—	

== 1998 Draft picks ==
Tampa Bay's draft picks from the 1998 NHL entry draft held on June 27, 1998, at the Marine Midland Arena in Buffalo, New York.

Round	Overall	Player	Nationality	Position	Club team	GP	G	A	Pts	PIM	W	L	T	OT	GAA	Notes
1	1	Vincent Lecavalier	(Canada)	C	Rimouski Oceanic (QMJHL)	1212	421	528	949	848	—	—	—	—	—	Stanley Cup — 2004; Maurice Richard Trophy — 2007; King Clancy Memorial Trophy—2008; NHL Foundation Player Award—2008
3	64	Brad Richards	(Canada)	C	Rimouski Oceanic (QMJHL)	1126	298	634	932	251	—	—	—	—	—	Stanley Cup — 2004; Lady Byng Trophy — 2004; Conn Smythe Trophy — 2004
3	64	Dmitry Afanasenkov	(Russia)	LW	Torpedo Yaroslavl (RSL)	227	27	27	54	52	—	—	—	—	—	Stanley Cup — 2004
4	92	Eric Beaudoin	(Canada)	LW	Guelph Storm (OHL)	53	3	8	11	41	—	—	—	—	—	
5	121	Curtis Rich	(Canada)	D	Calgary Hitmen (WHL)	—	—	—	—	—	—	—	—	—	—	
6	146	Sergei Kuznetsov	(Russia)	C	Torpedo Yaroslavl (RSL)	—	—	—	—	—	—	—	—	—	—	
7	174	Brett Allan	(Canada)	LW	Swift Current Broncos (WHL)	—	—	—	—	—	—	—	—	—	—	
7	194	Oak Hewer	(Canada)	C	Sault Ste. Marie Greyhounds (OHL)	—	—	—	—	—	—	—	—	—	—	
8	221	Daniel Hulak	(Canada)	D	Swift Current Broncos (WHL)	—	—	—	—	—	—	—	—	—	—	
9	229	Chris Lyness	(Canada)	D	Rouyn-Noranda Huskies (QMJHL)	—	—	—	—	—	—	—	—	—	—	
9	252	Martin Cibak	(Slovakia)	C	HK 32 (Slovak)	154	5	18	23	60	—	—	—	—	—	Stanley Cup — 2004

== 1999 Draft picks ==
Tampa Bay's draft picks from the 1999 NHL entry draft held on June 26, 1999, at the FleetCenter in Boston.

Round	Overall	Player	Nationality	Position	Club team	GP	G	A	Pts	PIM	W	L	T	OT	GAA	Notes
2	47	Sheldon Keefe	(Canada)	RW	Barrie Colts (OHL)	125	12	12	24	78	—	—	—	—	—	
3	67	Evgeny Konstantinov	(Russia)	G	Kazan Ak-Bars (RSL)	2	0	0	0	2	0	0	0	—	2.86	
3	75	Brett Scheffelmaier	(Canada)	RW	Medicine Hat Tigers (WHL)	—	—	—	—	—	—	—	—	—	—	
3	88	Jimmie Olvestad	(Sweden)	RW	Djurgardens IF (SEL)	111	3	14	17	40	—	—	—	—	—	
5	127	Kaspars Astasenko	(Latvia)	D	CSKA Moscow (RSL)	23	1	2	3	8	—	—	—	—	—	
5	148	Michal Lanicek	(Czech Republic)	G	Slavia Praha Jr. (Czech)	—	—	—	—	—	—	—	—	—	—	
6	182	Fedor Fedorov	(Russia)	C	Port Huron Border Cats UHL)	18	0	2	2	14	—	—	—	—	—	
7	187	Ivan Rachunek	(Czech Republic)	LW	Zlin ZPS HC (Czech)	—	—	—	—	—	—	—	—	—	—	
8	216	Erkki Rajamaki	(Finland)	LW	HIFK (SM-liiga)	—	—	—	—	—	—	—	—	—	—	
9	244	Mikko Kuparinen	(Finland)	D	Grand Rapids Griffins (IHL)	—	—	—	—	—	—	—	—	—	—	

== 2000 Draft picks ==
Tampa Bay's draft picks from the 2000 NHL entry draft held on June 24 and 25, 2000, at the Saddledome in Calgary, Alberta.

Round	Overall	Player	Nationality	Position	Club team	GP	G	A	Pts	PIM	W	L	T	OT	GAA	Notes
1	8	Nikita Alexeev	(Russia)	LW	Erie Otters (OHL)	159	20	17	37	28	—	—	—	—	—	
2	34	Ruslan Zainullin	(Russia)	RW	Ak Bars Kazan (RSL)	—	—	—	—	—	—	—	—	—	—	
3	81	Alexander Kharitonov	(Russia)	RW	Dynamo Moscow (RSL)	71	7	15	22	12	—	—	—	—	—	
4	126	Johan Hagglund	(Sweden)	C	Modo Hockey Jr. (SEL)	—	—	—	—	—	—	—	—	—	—	
5	161	Pavel Sedov	(Russia)	RW	Voskresensk (RSL)	—	—	—	—	—	—	—	—	—	—	
6	191	Aaron Gionet	(Canada)	D	Kamloops Blazers (WHL)	—	—	—	—	—	—	—	—	—	—	
7	222	Marek Priechodsky	(Slovakia)	D	Slovan Bratislava (Slovak)	—	—	—	—	—	—	—	—	—	—	
7	226	Brian Eklund	(United States)	G	Brown University (ECAC)	1	0	0	0	0	0	1	0	—	3.10	
7	233	Alexander Polukeyev	(Russia)	G	SKA Saint Petersburg (RSL)	—	—	—	—	—	—	—	—	—	—	
9	263	Thomas Ziegler	(Switzerland)	C	Ambri-Piotta (Swiss-A)	5	0	0	0	0	—	—	—	—	—	

== 2001 Draft picks ==
Tampa Bay's draft picks from the 2001 NHL entry draft held on June 23 and 24, 2001, at the National Car Rental Center in Sunrise, Florida.

Round	Overall	Player	Nationality	Position	Club team	GP	G	A	Pts	PIM	W	L	T	OT	GAA	Notes
1	3	Alexander Svitov	(Russia)	C	Avangard Omsk (RSL)	179	13	24	37	223	—	—	—	—	—	
2	47	Alexander Polushin	(Russia)	LW	THK Tver (Rus-2)	—	—	—	—	—	—	—	—	—	—	
2	61	Andreas Holmqvist	(Sweden)	D	Hammarby IF (SWE-Jr.)	—	—	—	—	—	—	—	—	—	—	
3	94	Evgeny Artyukhin	(Russia)	RW	Podolsk Vityaz (RSL)	199	19	30	49	313	—	—	—	—	—	
4	123	Aaron Lobb	(Canada)	RW	London Knights (OHL)	—	—	—	—	—	—	—	—	—	—	
5	138	Paul Lynch	(United States)	D	Valley Jr. Warriors (EJHL)	—	—	—	—	—	—	—	—	—	—	
6	188	Art Femenella	(United States)	D	Sioux City Musketeers (USHL)	—	—	—	—	—	—	—	—	—	—	
7	219	Dennis Packard	(United States)	LW	Harvard University (ECAC	—	—	—	—	—	—	—	—	—	—	
7	222	Jeremy Van Hoof	(Canada)	D	Ottawa 67's (OHL)	—	—	—	—	—	—	—	—	—	—	
2	252	Jean-Francois Soucy	(Canada)	LW	Montreal Rocket (QMJHL)	—	—	—	—	—	—	—	—	—	—	
8	259	Dmitri Bezrukov	(Russia)	D	Neftekhimik Nizhnekamsk (RSL)	—	—	—	—	—	—	—	—	—	—	
9	261	Vitali Smolyaninov	(Russia)	D	Neftekhimik Nizhnekamsk (RSL)	—	—	—	—	—	—	—	—	—	—	
9	281	Ilya Solaryov	(Kazakhstan)	LW	Perm Molot (RSL)	—	—	—	—	—	—	—	—	—	—	
9	289	Henrik Bergfors	(Sweden)	D	Sodertalje SK Jr. (SWE-Jr.)	—	—	—	—	—	—	—	—	—	—	

== 2002 Draft picks ==
Tampa Bay's draft picks from the 2002 NHL entry draft held on June 22 and 23, 2002, at the Air Canada Centre in Toronto, Ontario.

Round	Overall	Player	Nationality	Position	Club team	GP	G	A	Pts	PIM	W	L	T	OT	GAA	Notes
2	60	Adam Henrich	(Canada)	LW	Brampton Battalion (OHL)	—	—	—	—	—	—	—	—	—	—	
4	100	Dmitri Kazionov	(Russia)	C	CSKA Moscow (RSL)	—	—	—	—	—	—	—	—	—	—	
5	135	Joseph Pearce	(United States)	G	New Hampshire Jr. Monarchs (EJHL)	—	—	—	—	—	—	—	—	—	—	
5	162	Gerard Dicaire	(Canada)	D	Kootenay Ice (WHL)	—	—	—	—	—	—	—	—	—	—	
6	170	P. J. Atherton	(United States)	D	Cedar Rapids RoughRiders (USHL)	—	—	—	—	—	—	—	—	—	—	
6	174	Karri Akkanen	(Finland)	F	Ilves (SM-liiga)	—	—	—	—	—	—	—	—	—	—	
6	183	Paul Ranger	(Canada)	D	Oshawa Generals (OHL)	324	24	82	106	254	—	—	—	—	—	
7	213	Fredrik Norrena	(Finland)	G	HC TPS (SM-liiga)	100	0	1	1	6	35	45	—	11	2.79	
8	233	Vasily Koshechkin	(Russia)	G	Lada Togliatti (RSL)	—	—	—	—	—	—	—	—	—	—	
2	55	Ryan Craig	(Canada)	C	Brandon Wheat Kings (WHL)	—	—	—	—	—	—	—	—	—	—	
8	256	Darren Reid	(Canada)	RW	Medicine Hat Tigers (WHL)	21	0	1	1	18	—	—	—	—	—	
9	286	Alexei Glukhov	(Russia)	LW	Chimik (RSL)	—	—	—	—	—	—	—	—	—	—	
9	287	John Toffey	(United States)	C	Ohio State University (CCHA)	—	—	—	—	—	—	—	—	—	—	

== 2003 Draft picks ==
Tampa Bay's draft picks from the 2003 NHL entry draft held on June 21 and 22, 2003, at the Gaylord Entertainment Center in Nashville, Tennessee.

Round	Overall	Player	Nationality	Position	Club team	GP	G	A	Pts	PIM	W	L	T	OT	GAA	Notes
2	34	Mike Egener	(Germany)	D	Calgary Hitmen (WHL)	—	—	—	—	—	—	—	—	—	—	
2	41	Matt Smaby	(United States)	D	Shattuck-Saint Mary's (MSHSL)	122	0	6	6	106	—	—	—	—	—	
3	96	Jonathan Boutin	(Canada)	G	Halifax Mooseheads (QMJHL)	—	—	—	—	—	—	—	—	—	—	
6	92	Doug O'Brien	(Canada)	D	Hull Olympiques (QMJHL)	5	0	0	0	2	—	—	—	—	—	
7	224	Gerald Coleman	(United States)	G	London Knights (OHL)	2	0	0	0	0	0	0	1	—	2.79	
7	227	Jay Rosehill	(Canada)	LW	Olds Grizzlys (AJHL)	117	5	3	8	352	—	—	—	—	—	
8	255	Raimonds Danilics	(Latvia)	F	Stalkers Juniors Daugavpils (LHHL)	—	—	—	—	—	—	—	—	—	—	
8	256	Brady Greco	(United States)	D	Chicago Steel (USHL)	—	—	—	—	—	—	—	—	—	—	
9	273	Albert Vishnyakov	(Russia)	LW	Ak Bars Kazan (RSL)	—	—	—	—	—	—	—	—	—	—	
9	286	Zbynek Hrdel	(Czech Republic)	C	Rimouski Oceanic (QMJHL)	—	—	—	—	—	—	—	—	—	—	
9	287	Nick Tarnasky	(Canada)	C	Lethbridge Hurricanes (WHL)	—	—	—	—	—	—	—	—	—	—	

== 2004 Draft picks ==
Tampa Bay's draft picks from the 2004 NHL entry draft held on June 26 and 27, 2004, at the RBC Center in Raleigh, North Carolina.

Round	Overall	Player	Nationality	Position	Club team	GP	G	A	Pts	PIM	W	L	T	OT	GAA	Notes
1	30	Andy Rogers	(Canada)	D	Calgary Hitmen (WHL)	—	—	—	—	—	—	—	—	—	—	
2	65	Mark Tobin	(Canada)	LW	Rimouski Oceanic (QMJHL)	—	—	—	—	—	—	—	—	—	—	
4	102	Mike Lundin	(United States)	D	University of Maine (H-East)	252	4	32	36	54	—	—	—	—	—	
5	158	Brandon Elliott	(Canada)	D	Mississauga Steelheads (OHL)	—	—	—	—	—	—	—	—	—	—	
5	163	Dusty Collins	(United States)	C	Northern Michigan University (CCHA)	—	—	—	—	—	—	—	—	—	—	
6	188	Jan Zapletal	(Czech Republic)	D	VHK Vsetin Jr. (Czech)	—	—	—	—	—	—	—	—	—	—	
6	191	Karri Ramo	(Finland)	G	Pelicans (SM-liiga)	159	0	4	4	16	60	63	—	18	2.85	
8	245	Justin Keller	(Canada)	LW	Kelowna Rockets (WHL)	—	—	—	—	—	—	—	—	—	—	

== 2005 Draft picks ==
Tampa Bay's draft picks from the 2005 NHL entry draft held on July 30, 2005, at the Westin Hotel in Ottawa, Ontario.

Round	Overall	Player	Nationality	Position	Club team	GP	G	A	Pts	PIM	W	L	T	OT	GAA	Notes
1	30	Vladimir Mihalik	(Slovakia)	D	Presov (Slovak)	15	0	3	3	8	—	—	—	—	—	
3	73	Radek Smolenak	(Czech Republic)	LW	Kingston Frontenacs (OHL)	7	0	1	1	15	—	—	—	—	—	
3	89	Chris Lawrence	(Canada)	C	Sault Ste. Marie Greyhounds (OHL)	—	—	—	—	—	—	—	—	—	—	
4	92	Marek Bartanus	(Slovakia)	RW	HC Kosice Jr. (Slovak)	—	—	—	—	—	—	—	—	—	—	
4	102	Blair Jones	(Canada)	C	Moose Jaw Warriors (WHL)	132	7	10	17	65	—	—	—	—	—	
5	133	Stanislav Lascek	(Slovakia)	RW	Chicoutimi Sagueneens (QMJHL)	—	—	—	—	—	—	—	—	—	—	
6	163	Marek Kvapil	(Czech Republic)	LW	Saginaw Spirit (OHL)	—	—	—	—	—	—	—	—	—	—	
6	165	Kevin Beech	(Canada)	G	Sudbury Wolves (OHL)	—	—	—	—	—	—	—	—	—	—	
7	255	John Wessbecker	(United States)	D	Blake School (MSHSL)	—	—	—	—	—	—	—	—	—	—	

== 2006 Draft picks ==
Tampa Bay's draft picks from the 2006 NHL entry draft held on June 24, 2006, at General Motors Place in Vancouver, British Columbia.

Round	Overall	Player	Nationality	Position	Club team	GP	G	A	Pts	PIM	W	L	T	OT	GAA	Notes
1	15	Riku Helenius	(Finland)	G	Ilves (SM-liiga)	1	0	0	0	0	0	0	—	0	0.00	
3	78	Kevin Quick	(United States)	D	Sudbury Wolves (OHL)	6	0	1	1	0	—	—	—	—	—	
6	168	Dane Crowley	(Canada)	D	Swift Current Broncos (WHL)	—	—	—	—	—	—	—	—	—	—	
7	198	Denis Kazionov	(Russia)	LW	THK Tver (RSL)	—	—	—	—	—	—	—	—	—	—	

== 2007 Draft picks ==
Tampa Bay's draft picks at the 2007 NHL entry draft held on June 22 and 23, 2007, at Nationwide Arena in Columbus, Ohio.

Round	Overall	Player	Nationality	Position	Club team	GP	G	A	Pts	PIM	W	L	T	OT	GAA	Notes
2	47	Dana Tyrell	(Canada)	C	Prince George Cougars (WHL)	135	7	17	24	26	—	—	—	—	—	
3	75	Luca Cunti	(Switzerland)	LW	Dubendorf (Swiss-3)	—	—	—	—	—	—	—	—	—	—	
3	77	Alex Killorn	(Canada)	C	Deerfield Academy (ESA)	1032	250	322	572	605	—	—	—	—	—	Stanley Cup — 2020, 2021
4	107	Mitch Fadden	(Canada)	C	Lethbridge Hurricanes (WHL)	—	—	—	—	—	—	—	—	—	—	
6	167	Johan Harju	(Sweden)	LW	Lulea HF (SEL)	10	1	2	3	2	—	—	—	—	—	
7	183	Torrie Jung	(Canada)	G	Kelowna Rockets (WHL)	—	—	—	—	—	—	—	—	—	—	
7	197	Michael Ward	(Canada)	D	Lewiston Maineiacs (QMJHL)	—	—	—	—	—	—	—	—	—	—	
7	210	Justin Courtnall	(Canada)	LW	Burnaby Express (BCHL)	—	—	—	—	—	—	—	—	—	—	

== 2008 Draft picks ==
Tampa Bay's picks at the 2008 NHL entry draft held on June 20 and 21, 2007, at Scotiabank Place in Ottawa.

Round	Overall	Player	Nationality	Position	Club team	GP	G	A	Pts	PIM	W	L	T	OT	GAA	Notes
1	1	Steven Stamkos	(Canada)	C	Sarnia Sting (OHL)	1246	624	632	1256	737	—	—	—	—	—	Stanley Cup — 2020, 2021; Maurice "Rocket" Richard Trophy — 2010, 2012
4	117	James Wright	(Canada)	C	Vancouver Giants (WHL)	146	4	8	12	64	—	—	—	—	—	
5	122	Dustin Tokarski	(Canada)	G	Spokane Chiefs (WHL)	86	0	3	3	2	27	36	—	12	3.08	
5	147	Kyle De Coste	(Canada)	RW	Brampton Battalion (OHL)	—	—	—	—	—	—	—	—	—	—	
6	152	Mark Barberio	(Canada)	D	Moncton Wildcats (QMJHL)	272	14	42	56	115	—	—	—	—	—	
6	160	Luke Witkowski	(United States)	D/RW	Ohio Junior Blue Jackets (USHL)	132	2	11	13	162	—	—	—	—	—	
7	182	Matias Sointu	(Finland)	LW	Ilves Jr. (FIN-Jr.)	—	—	—	—	—	—	—	—	—	—	
7	203	David Carle	(United States)	D	Shattuck-Saint Mary's (MSHSL)	—	—	—	—	—	—	—	—	—	—	

== 2009 Draft picks ==
Tampa Bay's picks at the 2009 NHL entry draft held on June 26–27, 2009, at the Centre Bell in Montreal.

Round	Overall	Player	Nationality	Position	Club team	GP	G	A	Pts	PIM	W	L	T	OT	GAA	Notes
1	2	Victor Hedman	(Sweden)	D	Modo Hockey (SHL)	1164	172	639	811	782	—	—	—	—	—	Stanley Cup — 2020, 2021; Conn Smythe Trophy—2020; James Norris Memorial Trophy — 2018
1	29	Carter Ashton	(Canada)	RW	Lethbridge Hurricanes (WHL)	54	0	3	3	32	—	—	—	—	—	
2	52	Richard Panik	(Slovakia)	RW	HC Ocelari Trinec (Czech)	521	88	107	195	274	—	—	—	—	—	
4	93	Alex Hutchings	(Canada)	LW	Barrie Colts (OHL)	—	—	—	—	—	—	—	—	—	—	
5	148	Michael Zadorv	(Canada)	G	Oshawa Generals (OHL)	—	—	—	—	—	—	—	—	—	—	
6	162	Jaroslav Janus	(Slovakia)	G	Erie Otters (OHL)	—	—	—	—	—	—	—	—	—	—	
7	183	Kirill Gotovets	(Belarus)	D	Shattuck-Saint Mary's (MSHSL)	—	—	—	—	—	—	—	—	—	—	

== 2010 Draft picks ==
Tampa Bay's picks at the 2010 NHL entry draft held on June 25 and 26, 2010, at the Staples Center in Los Angeles.

Round	Overall	Player	Nationality	Position	Club team	GP	G	A	Pts	PIM	W	L	T	OT	GAA	Notes
1	6	Brett Connolly	(Canada)	RW	Prince George Cougars (WHL)	536	101	94	195	241	—	—	—	—	—	
3	63	Brock Beukeboom	(United States)	D	Sault Ste. Marie Greyhounds (OHL)	—	—	—	—	—	—	—	—	—	—	
3	66	Radko Gudas	(Czech Republic)	D	Everett Silvertips (WHL)	885	42	169	211	1124	—	—	—	—	—	
3	72	Adam Janosik	(Slovakia)	D	Gatineau Olympiques (QMJHL)	—	—	—	—	—	—	—	—	—	—	
4	96	Geoffrey Schemitsch	(Canada)	D	Owen Sound Attack (OHL)	—	—	—	—	—	—	—	—	—	—	
4	118	Jimmy Mullin	(United States)	C/RW	Shattuck-Saint Mary's (MSHSL)	—	—	—	—	—	—	—	—	—	—	
6	156	Brendan O'Donnell	(Canada)	C	Winnipeg South Blues (MJHL)	—	—	—	—	—	—	—	—	—	—	
7	186	Teigan Zahn	(Canada)	D	Saskatoon Blades (WHL)	—	—	—	—	—	—	—	—	—	—	

== 2011 Draft picks ==
Tampa Bay's picks at the 2011 NHL entry draft held on June 24 and 25, 2011, at the Xcel Energy Center in St. Paul, Minnesota

Round	Overall	Player	Nationality	Position	Club team	GP	G	A	Pts	PIM	W	L	T	OT	GAA	Notes
1	27	Vladislav Namestnikov	(Russia)	C	London Knights (OHL)	846	145	205	350	434	—	—	—	—	—	
2	58	Nikita Kucherov	(Russia)	RW	Krasnaya Armiya (MHL)	879	401	723	1124	436	—	—	—	—	—	Stanley Cup — 2020, 2021; Art Ross Trophy—2019, 2024, 2025; Hart Memorial Trophy—2019; Ted Lindsay Award—2019, 2025
5	148	Nikita Nesterov	(Russia)	D	Chelyabinsk Jr. (MHL)	170	9	28	37	101	—	—	—	—	—	
6	178	Adam Wilcox	(United States)	G	Green Bay Gamblers (USHL)	1	0	0	0	0	0	0	—	0	0.00	
7	201	Matthew Peca	(Canada)	C	Pembroke Lumber Kings (CCHL)	83	6	15	21	6	—	—	—	—	—	
7	208	Ondrej Palat	(Czech Republic)	LW	Drummondville Voltigeurs (QMJHL)	905	182	338	520	266	—	—	—	—	—	Stanley Cup — 2020, 2021

== 2012 Draft picks ==
Tampa Bay's picks at the 2012 NHL entry draft held on June 22 and 23, 2012, at the Consol Energy Center in Pittsburgh, Pennsylvania.

Round	Overall	Player	Nationality	Position	Club team	GP	G	A	Pts	PIM	W	L	T	OT	GAA	Notes
1	10	Slater Koekkoek	(Canada)	D	Peterborough Petes (OHL)	186	8	26	34	104	—	—	—	—	—	
1	19	Andrei Vasilevskiy	(Russia)	G	Tolpar Ufa (MHL)	598	0	24	24	53	370	178	—	39	2.49	Stanley Cup — 2020, 2021; Conn Smythe Trophy—2021; Vezina Trophy—2019
2	40	Dylan Blujus	(United States)	D	Brampton Battalion (OHL)	—	—	—	—	—	—	—	—	—	—	
2	53	Brian Hart	(United States)	RW	Phillips Exeter Academy (ESA)	—	—	—	—	—	—	—	—	—	—	
3	71	Tanner Richard	(Switzerland)	RW	Guelph Storm (OHL)	3	0	0	0	2	—	—	—	—	—	
4	101	Cedric Paquette	(Canada)	C	Blainville-Boisbriand Armada (QMJHL)	448	51	44	95	391	—	—	—	—	—	Stanley Cup — 2020
6	161	Jake Dotchin	(Canada)	D	Owen Sound Attack (OHL)	103	3	20	23	112	—	—	—	—	—	
7	202	Nikita Gusev	(Russia)	LW	Krasnaya Armiya (MHL)	97	17	37	54	14	—	—	—	—	—	

== 2013 Draft picks ==
Tampa Bay's picks at the 2013 NHL entry draft held on June 30, 2013, at the Prudential Center in Newark, New Jersey.

Round	Overall	Player	Nationality	Position	Club team	GP	G	A	Pts	PIM	W	L	T	OT	GAA	Notes
1	3	Jonathan Drouin	(Canada)	LW	Halifax Mooseheads (QMJHL)	671	111	287	398	238	—	—	—	—	—	
2	33	Adam Erne	(United States)	LW	Quebec Remparts (QMJHL)	424	47	52	99	199	—	—	—	—	—	
5	124	Kristers Gudlevskis	(Latvia)	G	HK Riga (MHL)	3	0	0	0	0	1	0	—	1	1.37	
6	154	Henri Ikonen	(Finland)	LW	Kingston Frontenacs (OHL)	—	—	—	—	—	—	—	—	—	—	
7	184	Saku Salminen	(Finland)	C	K-Vantaa (FIN-2)	—	—	—	—	—	—	—	—	—	—	
7	186	Joel Vermin	(Switzerland)	RW	SC Bern (NLA)	24	0	4	4	4	—	—	—	—	—	

== 2014 Draft picks ==
Tampa Bay's picks at the 2014 NHL entry draft held on June 27 and 28, 2014, at the Wells Fargo Center in Philadelphia.

Round	Overall	Player	Nationality	Position	Club team	GP	G	A	Pts	PIM	W	L	T	OT	GAA	Notes
1	19	Tony DeAngelo	(United States)	D	Sarnia Sting (OHL)	482	57	207	264	382	—	—	—	—	—	
2	35	Dominik Masin	(Czech Republic)	D	Slavia Prague Jr. (Czech-Jr.)	—	—	—	—	—	—	—	—	—	—	
2	57	Johnathan Macleod	(United States)	D	U.S. National Development Team (USHL)	—	—	—	—	—	—	—	—	—	—	
3	79	Brayden Point	(Canada)	C	Moose Jaw Warriors (WHL)	720	324	361	685	163	—	—	—	—	—	Stanley Cup — 2020, 2021
4	119	Ben Thomas	(Canada)	D	Calgary Hitmen (WHL)	5	0	0	0	0	—	—	—	—	—	
6	170	Cristiano Digiacinto	(Canada)	LW	Windsor Spitfires (OHL)	—	—	—	—	—	—	—	—	—	—	
7	185	Cameron Darcy	(United States)	C	Cape Breton Screaming Eagles (QMJHL)	—	—	—	—	—	—	—	—	—	—	

== 2015 Draft picks ==
Tampa Bay's picks at the 2015 NHL entry draft held on June 26 and 27, 2015, at BB&T Center in Sunrise, Florida.

Round	Overall	Player	Nationality	Position	Club team	GP	G	A	Pts	PIM	W	L	T	OT	GAA	Notes
2	33	Mitchell Stephens	(Canada)	C	Saginaw Spirit (OHL)	123	6	13	19	28	—	—	—	—	—	Stanley Cup — 2020
2	44	Matthew Spencer	(Canada)	D	Peterborough Petes (OHL)	—	—	—	—	—	—	—	—	—	—	
3	64	Dennis Yan	(United States)	LW	Shawinigan Cataractes (QMJHL)	—	—	—	—	—	—	—	—	—	—	
3	72	Anthony Cirelli	(Canada)	C	Oshawa Generals (OHL)	582	147	197	344	297	—	—	—	—	—	Stanley Cup — 2020, 2021
4	118	Jonne Tammela	(Finland)	RW	KalPa (SM-liiga)	—	—	—	—	—	—	—	—	—	—	
4	120	Mathieu Joseph	(Canada)	RW	Saint John Sea Dogs (QMJHL)	471	61	99	160	205	—	—	—	—	—	Stanley Cup — 2020, 2021
5	150	Ryan Zuhlsdorf	(United States)	D	Sioux City Musketeers (USHL)	—	—	—	—	—	—	—	—	—	—	
6	153	Kristian Oldham	(Canada)	G	Omaha Lancers (USHL)	—	—	—	—	—	—	—	—	—	—	
6	180	Bokondji Imama	(Canada)	LW	Saint John Sea Dogs (QMJHL)	33	2	0	2	52	—	—	—	—	—	

== 2016 Draft picks ==
Tampa Bay's picks at the 2016 NHL entry draft held on June 24 and 25, 2016, at First Niagara Center in Buffalo, New York.

Round	Overall	Player	Nationality	Position	Club team	GP	G	A	Pts	PIM	W	L	T	OT	GAA	Notes
1	27	Brett Howden	(Canada)	C	Moose Jaw Warriors (WHL)	489	74	89	163	246	—	—	—	—	—	
2	37	Libor Hajek	(Czech Republic)	D	Saskatoon Blades (WHL)	110	4	8	12	40	—	—	—	—	—	
2	44	Boris Katchouk	(Canada)	LW	Sault Ste. Marie Greyhounds (OHL)	179	15	21	36	78	—	—	—	—	—	
2	58	Taylor Raddysh	(Canada)	RW	Erie Otters (OHL)	373	52	67	119	78	—	—	—	—	—	
3	88	Connor Ingram	(Canada)	G	Kamloops Blazers (WHL)	134	0	7	7	8	55	54	—	18	3.01	
4	118	Ross Colton	(United States)	C	Cedar Rapids RoughRiders (USHL)	404	89	87	176	182	—	—	—	—	—	Stanley Cup — 2021
5	148	Christopher Paquette	(Canada)	C	Niagara IceDogs (OHL)	—	—	—	—	—	—	—	—	—	—	
6	179	Oleg Sosunov	(Russia)	D	Loko-Yunior Yaroslavl (MHL-B)	—	—	—	—	—	—	—	—	—	—	
7	206	Otto Somppi	(Finland)	C	Halifax Mooseheads (QMJHL)	—	—	—	—	—	—	—	—	—	—	
7	208	Ryan Lohin	(United States)	C	Waterloo Black Hawks (USHL)	—	—	—	—	—	—	—	—	—	—	

== 2017 NHL Draft ==
Tampa Bay's picks at the 2017 NHL entry draft held on June 23 and 24, 2017, at the United Center in Chicago, Illinois.

Round	Overall	Player	Nationality	Position	Club team	GP	G	A	Pts	PIM	W	L	T	OT	GAA	Notes
1	14	Cal Foote	(Canada)	D	Kelowna Rockets (WHL)	145	5	15	20	137	—	—	—	—	—	Stanley Cup — 2021
2	48	Alexander Volkov	(Russia)	RW	SKA-1946 St. Petersburg (MHL)	46	7	7	14	12	—	—	—	—	—	Stanley Cup — 2020
3	48	Alexey Lipanov	(Russia)	C	Dynamo Balashikha (VHL)	—	—	—	—	—	—	—	—	—	—	
6	169	Nick Perbix	(United States)	D	Elk River High School (MSHL)	299	16	60	76	72	—	—	—	—	—	
6	180	Cole Guttman	(United States)	C	Dubuque Fighting Saints (USHL)	41	8	6	14	9	—	—	—	—	—	Signed with Chicago Blackhawks.
7	200	Sammy Walker	(United States)	C	Edina High School (MSHL)	13	1	1	2	0	—	—	—	—	—	Signed with Minnesota Wild.

== 2018 NHL Draft ==
Tampa Bay's picks at the 2018 NHL entry draft held on June 22 and 23, 2018, at the American Airlines Center in Dallas, Texas.

Round	Overall	Player	Nationality	Position	Club team	GP	G	A	Pts	PIM	W	L	T	OT	GAA	Notes
2	59	Gabriel Fortier	(Canada)	LW	Baie-Comeau Drakkar (QMJHL)	11	1	0	1	4	—	—	—	—	—	
3	90	Dmitry Semykin	(Russia)	D	Kapitan Stupino (MHL)	—	—	—	—	—	—	—	—	—	—	
4	121	Alexander Green	(United States)	D	Cornell University (ECAC)	—	—	—	—	—	—	—	—	—	—	
5	152	Magnus Chrona	(Sweden)	G	Nacka HK (J18)	—	—	—	—	—	—	—	—	—	—	
6	183	Cole Koepke	(United States)	LW	Sioux City Musketeers (USHL)	165	19	18	37	35	—	—	—	—	—	
7	206	Radim Salda	(Czech Republic)	D	Saint John Sea Dogs (QMJHL)	—	—	—	—	—	—	—	—	—	—	
7	214	Ty Taylor	(Canada)	G	Vernon Vipers (BCHL)	—	—	—	—	—	—	—	—	—	—	

== 2019 NHL Draft ==
Tampa Bay's picks at the 2019 NHL entry draft held on June 21 and 22, 2019, at the Rogers Arena in Vancouver, British Columbia.

Round	Overall	Player	Nationality	Position	Club team	GP	G	A	Pts	PIM	W	L	T	OT	GAA	Notes
1	27	Nolan Foote	(Canada)	LW	Kelowna Rockets (WHL)	42	7	3	10	6	—	—	—	—	—	Traded to New Jersey Devils.
3	71	Hugo Alnefelt	(Sweden)	G	HV71 (J20 SuperElit)	1	0	0	0	0	0	0	—	0	9.00	
3	89	Maxim Cajkovic	(Slovakia)	RW	Saint John Sea Dogs (QMJHL)	—	—	—	—	—	—	—	—	—	—	
4	120	Max Crozier	(Canada)	D	Sioux Falls Stampede (USHL)	53	1	11	12	47	—	—	—	—	—	
6	182	Quinn Schmiemann	(Canada)	D	Kamloops Blazers (wHL)	—	—	—	—	—	—	—	—	—	—	
7	189	Mikhail Shalagin	(Russia)	LW	JHC Spartak (MHL)	—	—	—	—	—	—	—	—	—	—	
7	213	McKade Webster	(United States)	LW	Green Bay Gamblers (USHL)	—	—	—	—	—	—	—	—	—	—	

== 2020 NHL Draft ==
The 2020 NHL entry draft was originally scheduled to be held on June 26 and 27, 2020, at the Bell Centre in Montreal, Quebec. However, on March 25, 2020, the NHL announced that the draft was postponed due to the COVID-19 pandemic. The draft was held virtually on October 6 and 7, 2020. These are the Tampa Bay Lightning's picks at the 2020 NHL Entry Draft.

Round	Overall	Player	Nationality	Position	Club team	GP	G	A	Pts	PIM	W	L	T	OT	GAA	Notes
2	57	Jack Finley	(Canada)	C	Spokane Chiefs (WHL)	45	2	3	5	38	—	—	—	—	—	
2	62	Gage Goncalves	(Canada)	C	Everett Silvertips (WHL)	136	19	34	53	61	—	—	—	—	—	
3	85	Maxim Groshev	(Russia)	RW	HC Neftekhimik Nizhnekamsk (KHL)	2	0	1	1	0	—	—	—	—	—	
3	93	Jack Thompson	(Canada)	D	Sudbury Wolves (OHL)	34	4	6	10	10	—	—	—	—	—	
4	116	Eamon Powell	(United States)	D	U.S. National Team Development Program	—	—	—	—	—	—	—	—	—	—	
5	147	Jaydon Dureau	(Canada)	LW	Portland Winterhawks (WHL)	—	—	—	—	—	—	—	—	—	—	
6	157	Nick Capone	(United States)	RW	University of Connecticut (Hockey East)	—	—	—	—	—	—	—	—	—	—	
6	186	Amir Miftakhov	(Russia)	G	Ak Bars Kazan (KHL)	—	—	—	—	—	—	—	—	—	—	
7	217	Declan McDonnell	(United States)	RW	Kitchener Rangers (OHL)	—	—	—	—	—	—	—	—	—	—	

== 2021 NHL Draft ==
The 2021 NHL entry draft was held virtually on July 23 and 24, 2021. The draft was delated by one month from its normally scheduled time of June due to the COVID-19 pandemic and the later-than-normal finish of the 2020–21 NHL season.

Round	Overall	Player	Nationality	Position	Club team	GP	G	A	Pts	PIM	W	L	T	OT	GAA	Notes
3	96	Roman Schmidt	(United States)	D	U.S. National Development Team (USHL)	—	—	—	—	—	—	—	—	—	—	
4	126	Dylan Duke	(United States)	LW	U.S. National Development Team (USHL)	3	1	0	1	0	—	—	—	—	—	
5	160	Cameron MacDonald	(Canada)	C	Saint John Sea Dogs (QMJHL)	—	—	—	—	—	—	—	—	—	—	
6	192	Alex Gagne	(United States)	D	Muskegon Lumberjacks (USHL)	—	—	—	—	—	—	—	—	—	—	
7	196	Daniil Pylenkov	(Russia)	D	HC Vityaz (KHL)	—	—	—	—	—	—	—	—	—	—	
7	211	Robert Flinton	(United States)	LW	St. Paul's Prep School (ESA)	—	—	—	—	—	—	—	—	—	—	
7	224	Niko Huuhtanen	(Finland)	RW	Tappara Jr. (Jr. A SM-Liiga)	—	—	—	—	—	—	—	—	—	—	

== 2022 NHL Draft ==
The 2022 NHL entry draft was held on July 7 and 8, 2022, at the Bell Centre in Montreal, Quebec.

Round	Overall	Player	Nationality	Position	Club team	GP	G	A	Pts	PIM	W	L	T	OT	GAA	Notes
1	31	Isaac Howard	(United States)	LW	U.S. National Development Team (USHL)	29	2	3	5	12	—	—	—	—	—	
3	86	Lucas Edmonds	(Sweden)	RW	Kingston Frontenacs (OHL)	—	—	—	—	—	—	—	—	—	—	
5	160	Nick Malik	(Czech Republic)	G	KooKoo (Liiga)	—	—	—	—	—	—	—	—	—	—	
6	192	Connor Kurth	(United States)	RW	Dubuque Fighting Saints (USHL)	—	—	—	—	—	—	—	—	—	—	
7	223	Dyllan Gill	(Canada)	D	Rouyn-Noranda Huskies (QMJHL)	—	—	—	—	—	—	—	—	—	—	
7	224	Klavs Veinbergs	(Latvia)	LW	HK Riga (MHL)	—	—	—	—	—	—	—	—	—	—	

== 2023 NHL Draft ==
The 2023 NHL entry draft was held on June 28 and 29, 2023, at the Bridgestone Arena in Nashville, Tennessee.

Round	Overall	Player	Nationality	Position	Club team	GP	G	A	Pts	PIM	W	L	T	OT	GAA	Notes
2	37	Ethan Gauthier	(Canada)	RW	Sherbrooke Phoenix (QMJHL)	—	—	—	—	—	—	—	—	—	—	
4	115	Jayson Shaugabay	(United States)	RW	Green Bay Gamblers (USHL)	—	—	—	—	—	—	—	—	—	—	
6	179	Warren Clark	(Canada)	D	Steinbach Pistons (MJHL)	—	—	—	—	—	—	—	—	—	—	
7	193	Jack Harvey	(United States)	C	Chicago Steel (USHL)	—	—	—	—	—	—	—	—	—	—	
7	211	Ethan Hay	(Canada)	C	Flint Firebirds (OHL)	—	—	—	—	—	—	—	—	—	—	

== 2024 NHL Draft ==
The 2024 NHL entry draft was held on June 28 and 29, 2024, at the Sphere in Las Vegas, Nevada.

Round	Overall	Player	Nationality	Position	Club team	GP	G	A	Pts	PIM	W	L	T	OT	GAA	Notes
4	118	Jan Golicic	(Slovenia)	D	Gatineau Olympiques (QMJHL)	—	—	—	—	—	—	—	—	—	—	
4	128	Hagen Burrows	(United States)	RW	Minnetonka High School (USHS-MN)	—	—	—	—	—	—	—	—	—	—	
5	149	Joona Saarelainen	(Finland)	C	KalPa (Liiga)	—	—	—	—	—	—	—	—	—	—	
6	181	Kaden Pitre	(Canada)	C	Flint Firebirds (OHL)	—	—	—	—	—	—	—	—	—	—	
7	195	Joe Connor	(United States)	LW	Muskegon Lumberjacks (USHL)	—	—	—	—	—	—	—	—	—	—	
7	199	Noah Steen	(Norway)	LW	Mora IK (HockeyAllsvenskan)	—	—	—	—	—	—	—	—	—	—	
7	206	Harrisson Meneghin	(Canada)	G	Lethbridge Hurricanes (WHL)	—	—	—	—	—	—	—	—	—	—	

== 2025 NHL Draft ==
The 2025 NHL entry draft was held on June 27 and 28, 2025, at the Peacock Theater in Los Angeles, California.

Round	Overall	Player	Nationality	Position	Club team	GP	G	A	Pts	PIM	W	L	T	OT	GAA	Notes
2	56	Ethan Czata	(Canada)	C	Niagara IceDogs (OHL)	—	—	—	—	—	—	—	—	—	—	
4	108	Benjamin Rautiainen	(Finland)	C	Tappara (Liiga)	—	—	—	—	—	—	—	—	—	—	
4	127	Aiden Foster	(Canada)	C	Prince George Cougars (WHL)	—	—	—	—	—	—	—	—	—	—	
5	151	Everett Baldwin	(United States)	D	U.S. NTDP (USHL)	—	—	—	—	—	—	—	—	—	—	
7	193	Caleb Heil	(United States)	G	Madison Capitols (USHL)	—	—	—	—	—	—	—	—	—	—	
7	206	Roman Luttsev	(Russia)	C	Lokomotiv Yaroslavl (MHL)	—	—	—	—	—	—	—	—	—	—	
7	212	Grant Spada	(Canada)	D	Guelph Storm (OHL)	—	—	—	—	—	—	—	—	—	—	
7	215	Marco Mignosa	(Canada)	RW	Soo Greyhounds (OHL)	—	—	—	—	—	—	—	—	—	—	

== 2026 NHL Draft ==
The 2026 NHL entry draft was held on June 26 and 27, 2026, at the KeyBank Center in Buffalo, New York.

Round	Overall	Player	Nationality	Position	Club team	GP	G	A	Pts	PIM	W	L	T	OT	GAA	Notes
2	52	Oleg Kulebyakin	(Russia)	RW	Halifax Mooseheads (QMJHL)	—	—	—	—	—	—	—	—	—	—	
3	90	Tomas Kralovic	(Slovakia)	D	HC Slovan Bratislava (Slovak Extraliga)	—	—	—	—	—	—	—	—	—	—	
5	134	Morgan Anderberg	(Sweden)	C	Växjö Lakers (SHL)	—	—	—	—	—	—	—	—	—	—	
5	153	Cooper Soller	(United States)	C	Sioux Falls Stampede (USHL)	—	—	—	—	—	—	—	—	—	—	
6	186	Stepan Shurygin	(Russia)	G	Saginaw Spirit (OHL)	—	—	—	—	—	—	—	—	—	—	
7	218	Max Vilén	(Sweden)	D	Moncton Wildcats (QMJHL)	—	—	—	—	—	—	—	—	—	—	

== See also ==
- List of Tampa Bay Lightning players
- 1992 NHL Expansion Draft
