= Alexander Svitov =

Russian ice hockey player (born 1982)

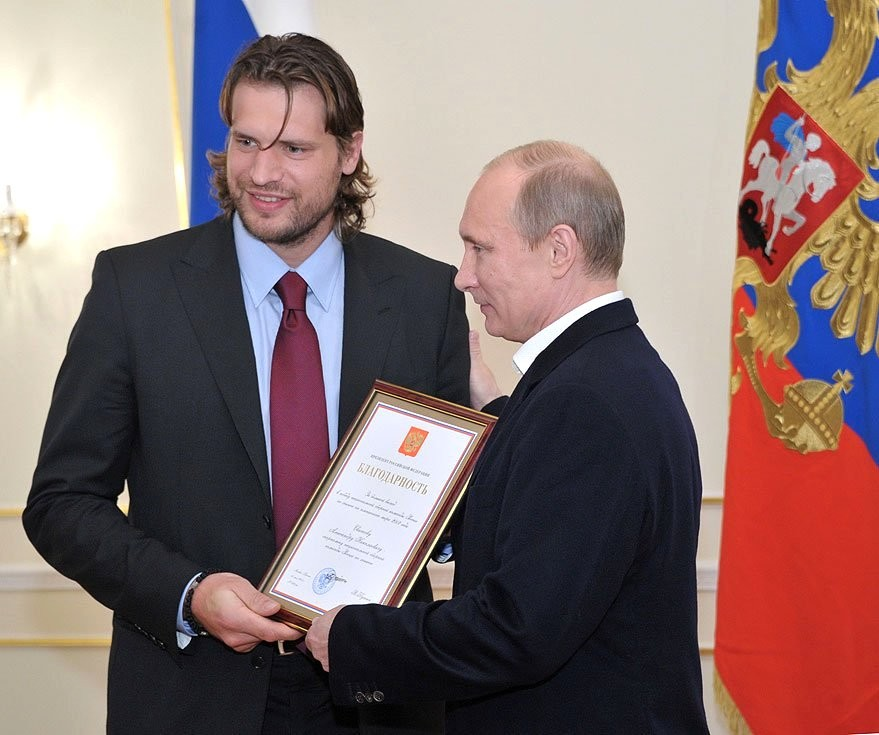
- Svitov in 2012
- Born: 3 November 1982 (age 43) Omsk, Russian SFSR, Soviet Union
- Height: 6 ft 3 in (191 cm)
- Weight: 245 lb (111 kg; 17 st 7 lb)
- Position: Centre
- Shot: Left
- Played for: Avangard Omsk; Tampa Bay Lightning; Columbus Blue Jackets; Salavat Yulaev Ufa; Ak Bars Kazan; Lokomotiv Yaroslavl
- National team: Russia
- NHL draft: 3rd overall, 2001; Tampa Bay Lightning
- Playing career: 1997–2022

Alexander Nikolayevich Svitov (Russian: Александр Николаевич Свитов; born 3 November 1982) is a Russian former professional ice hockey forward.

== Playing career ==
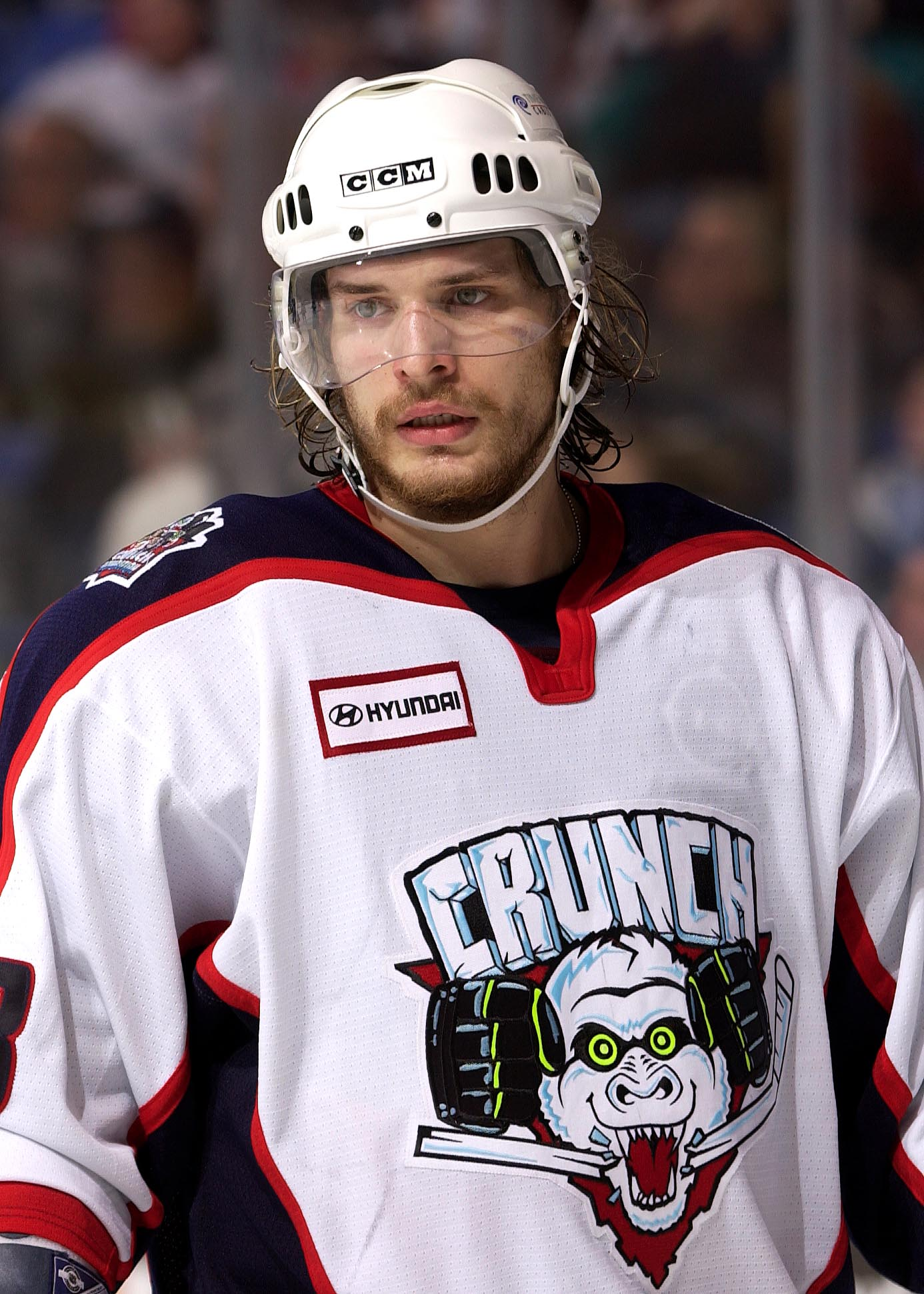
Svitov with the Syracuse Crunch in 2004

Svitov was drafted in the first round, third overall, by the Tampa Bay Lightning in the 2001 NHL entry draft.

He made his National Hockey League (NHL) debut with the Lightning in the 2002–03 season, appearing in 63 games and recording eight points. During the 2003–04 season, he was traded to the Columbus Blue Jackets in exchange for Darryl Sydor.

During the 2005–06 season, Svitov returned to Russia and played for his hometown, Avangard Omsk, in the Russian Superleague (RSL). In the following 2006–07 season, Svitov returned to the Blue Jackets and played in a career high 76 games, scoring 18 points.

On 17 August 2007, Svitov effectively ended his NHL career in signing a three-year contract with Avangard Omsk, after signing a two-year contract with the Blue Jackets on 2 July.

After a three-season stint with Salavat Yulaev Ufa, Svitov moved to Ak Bars Kazan as a free agent in the 2013–14 season. Svitov Captained Ak Bars in 5 of his 6 seasons with the club, winning the Gagarin Cup in the 2017–18 season.

On 15 June 2019, Svitov extended his professional career, agreeing to a one-year contract as a free agent with Lokomotiv Yaroslavl.

== International play ==
Svitov is the IIHF World U20 Championship all-time statistical leader in penalty minutes with 101 minutes in 11 games.

== Career statistics ==
=== Regular season and playoffs ===
			Regular season					Playoffs
Season	Team	League	GP	G	A	Pts	PIM	GP	G	A	Pts	PIM
1997–98	Metallurg–2 Magnitogorsk	RUS.3	4	0	0	0	0	—	—	—	—	—
1998–99	Avangard–2 Omsk	RUS.3	27	15	8	23	20	—	—	—	—	—
1998–99	Avangard Omsk	RSL	—	—	—	—	—	2	0	0	0	0
1999–2000	Avangard–2 Omsk	RUS.3	14	13	9	22	62	—	—	—	—	—
1999–2000	Avangard Omsk	RSL	19	3	3	6	45	6	1	0	1	16
2000–01	Avangard Omsk	RSL	39	8	6	14	111	14	2	1	3	34
2001–02	Avangard Omsk	RSL	3	0	1	1	2	—	—	—	—	—
2001–02	Avangard–2 Omsk	RUS.3	4	2	2	4	20	—	—	—	—	—
2001–02	CSKA–2 Moscow	RUS.3	2	1	0	1	2	—	—	—	—	—
2002–03	Springfield Falcons	AHL	11	4	5	9	17	—	—	—	—	—
2002–03	Tampa Bay Lightning	NHL	63	4	4	8	58	7	0	0	0	6
2003–04	Tampa Bay Lightning	NHL	11	0	3	3	4	—	—	—	—	—
2003–04	Hamilton Bulldogs	AHL	30	9	9	18	79	—	—	—	—	—
2003–04	Columbus Blue Jackets	NHL	29	2	6	8	16	—	—	—	—	—
2004–05	Syracuse Crunch	AHL	69	19	23	42	200	—	—	—	—	—
2005–06	Avangard Omsk	RSL	32	3	6	9	142	13	4	1	5	10
2006–07	Columbus Blue Jackets	NHL	76	7	11	18	145	—	—	—	—	—
2007–08	Avangard Omsk	RSL	54	10	11	21	140	4	0	3	3	10
2008–09	Avangard Omsk	KHL	32	8	8	16	86	6	1	0	1	41
2009–10	Avangard Omsk	KHL	44	7	16	23	95	3	1	0	1	4
2010–11	Salavat Yulayev Ufa	KHL	39	9	9	18	44	20	5	3	8	20
2011–12	Salavat Yulayev Ufa	KHL	42	10	9	19	40	6	1	2	3	29
2012–13	Salavat Yulayev Ufa	KHL	27	7	3	10	41	14	3	2	5	10
2013–14	Ak Bars Kazan	KHL	50	8	6	14	41	6	1	3	4	18
2014–15	Ak Bars Kazan	KHL	47	9	11	20	35	20	4	4	8	8
2015–16	Ak Bars Kazan	KHL	47	8	6	14	47	7	0	1	1	6
2016–17	Ak Bars Kazan	KHL	57	12	15	27	84	10	2	2	4	6
2017–18	Ak Bars Kazan	KHL	40	5	5	10	98	19	1	3	4	8
2018–19	Ak Bars Kazan	KHL	28	1	7	8	14	2	0	0	0	10
2018–19	Bars Kazan	VHL	3	3	0	3	0	—	—	—	—	—
2019–20	Lokomotiv Yaroslavl	KHL	40	2	10	12	32	6	0	0	0	8
2021–22	Omskie Krylia	VHL	9	2	1	3	8	—	—	—	—	—
RSL totals			147	24	27	51	446	39	7	5	12	70
NHL totals			179	13	24	37	223	7	0	0	0	6
KHL totals			493	86	106	192	657	119	19	20	39	168

=== International ===
Year	Team	Event	Result	GP	G	A	Pts	PIM
2000	Russia	WJC18	2nd place, silver medalist(s)	6	3	5	8	8
2001	Russia	WJC	7th	6	0	1	1	58
2002	Russia	WJC	1st place, gold medalist(s)	5	2	1	3	43
2012	Russia	WC	1st place, gold medalist(s)	10	0	0	0	4
2013	Russia	WC	6th	5	1	2	3	4
2014	Russia	OG	5th	0	—	—	—	—
Junior totals				17	5	8	13	109
Senior totals				15	1	2	3	8

== Awards and honours ==
Award	Year
KHL
Gagarin Cup (Salavat Yulaev Ufa)	2011
Gagarin Cup (Ak Bars Kazan)	2018

Awards and achievements
Preceded by Nikita Alexeev	Tampa Bay Lightning first-round draft pick 2001	Succeeded by Andy Rogers
