= Paul Mara =

American ice hockey player (born 1979)

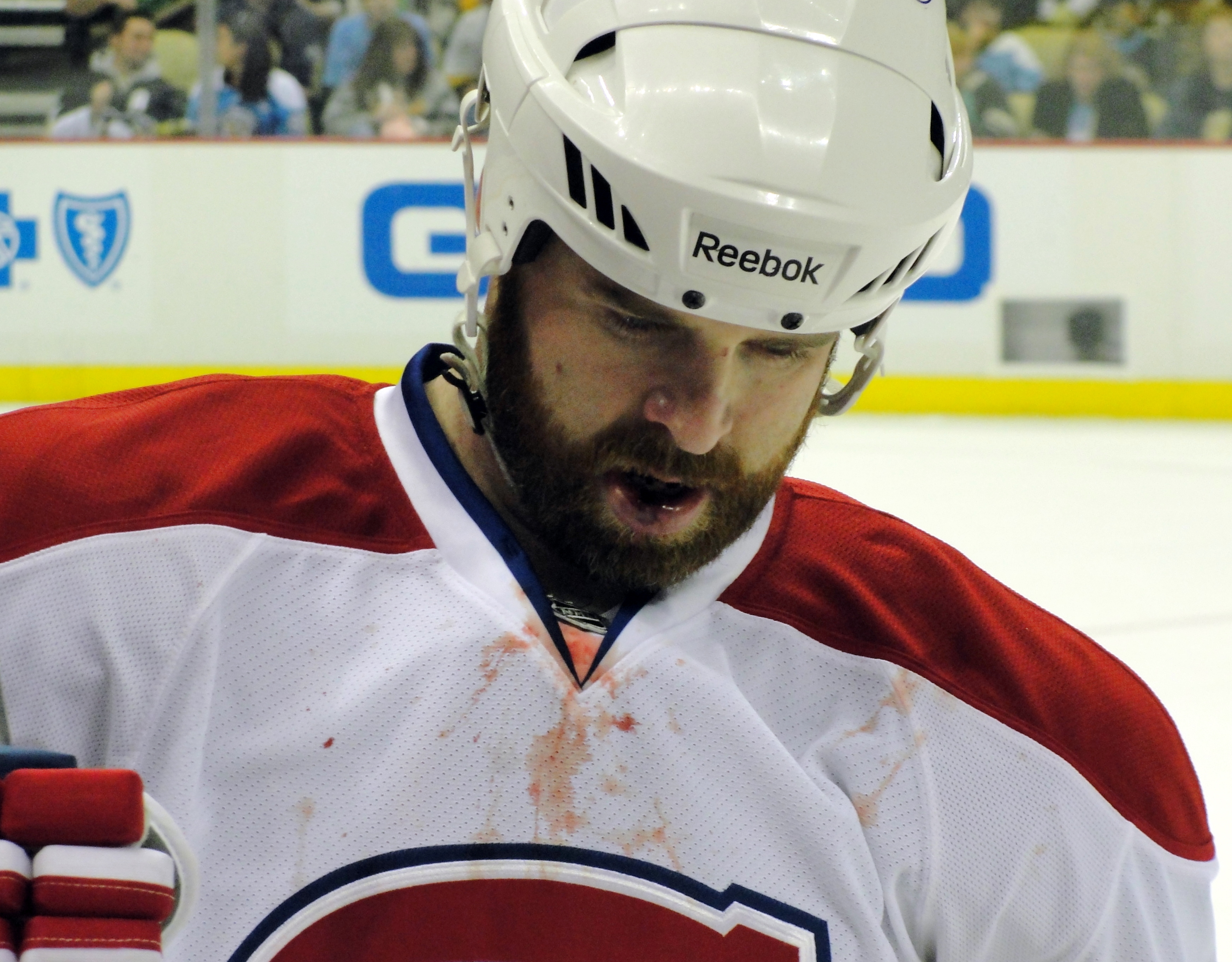
- Mara with the Montreal Canadiens in 2011
- Born: September 7, 1979 (age 47) Ridgewood, New Jersey, U.S.
- Height: 6 ft 4 in (193 cm)
- Weight: 207 lb (94 kg; 14 st 11 lb)
- Position: Defense
- Shot: Left
- Played for: Tampa Bay Lightning; Phoenix Coyotes; Boston Bruins; New York Rangers; Montreal Canadiens; Anaheim Ducks
- National team: United States
- NHL draft: 7th overall, 1997; Tampa Bay Lightning
- Playing career: 1999–2013

Paul Richard Mara (born September 7, 1979) is an American former professional ice hockey defenceman, who most recently served as the assistant coach of the Hartford Wolf Pack in the American Hockey League (AHL). He previously served as the head coach of the Boston Pride in the now defunct Premier Hockey Federation (PHF). Additionally, he served temporarily as an assistant to player development for the New York Rangers of the National Hockey League (NHL) in the 2023-24 season.

He was selected 7th overall by the Tampa Bay Lightning in the 1997 NHL entry draft, and went on to play 12 seasons in the NHL.

== Playing career ==
=== Amateur ===
As a youth, Mara played in the 1993 Quebec International Pee-Wee Hockey Tournament with a minor ice hockey team from the South Shore.

After playing two seasons of high school hockey in Massachusetts for Belmont Hill School Paul Mara joined the Sudbury Wolves of the Ontario Hockey League for the 1996–97 season. As part of a three-team trade with the Windsor Spitfires, Mara was traded to the Plymouth Whalers on December 16, 1997. In reflecting on his move from high school to Junior hockey Mara said, "It was the best decision of my life, to go up to Sudbury."

=== Professional ===
Mara was drafted in the first round, 7th overall, in the 1997 NHL entry draft by the Tampa Bay Lightning. He spent two seasons between the Lightning and their IHL affiliate team the Detroit Vipers before being traded to the Phoenix Coyotes in 2001. He played 81 games with the Coyotes in 2003–04. During the 2004 NHL lockout, Mara joined the Hannover Scorpions of the Deutsche Eishockey Liga.

After the lockout, Paul Mara scored a career-high 47 points that year. On June 26, 2006, he was traded by the Coyotes to the Boston Bruins for fellow defenseman Nick Boynton.

On February 27, 2007, Mara was traded to the New York Rangers for Aaron Ward. On July 4, 2008, Mara re-signed with the Rangers for one year at $1.95 million.

On July 10, 2009, Mara signed with the Montreal Canadiens.

On September 16, 2010, Mara signed with the Anaheim Ducks for one year at $750,000. After appearing in 33 games with the Ducks to start the 2010–11 season, on February 16, 2011, Mara was traded by the Ducks to the Montreal Canadiens in exchange for a 2012 fifth-round draft pick. He took a brief break from hockey during the 2011–12 season.

On September 26, 2012, Mara signed a one-year contract with the Ontario Reign of the ECHL.

On January 9, 2013, Mara signed with the Houston Aeros after the team became short on defensemen due to a combination of injuries and the end of the NHL lockout.

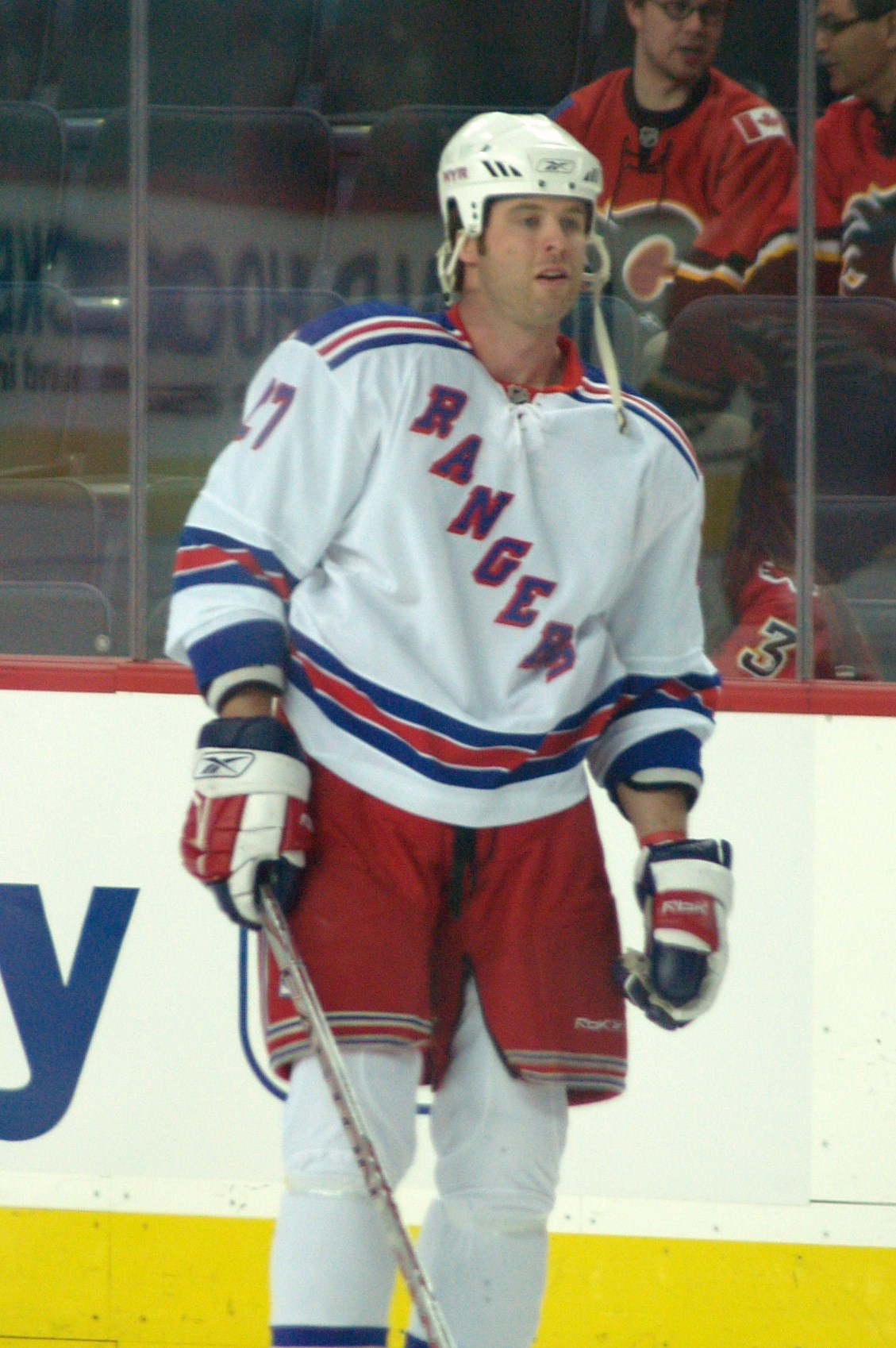
Mara with the Rangers in 2008

== Coaching career ==
Mara was the assistant coach of the 2018 Olympic United States women's national ice hockey team. On May 30, 2018, Mara was named head coach of the PHF's (formerly NWHL) Boston Pride. He is currently the head coach with the most wins in PHF history, and one of only two coaches to win more than 30 games. Mara became the first coach in PHF history to win 50 games in November 2022.

Mara served temporarily as an assistant to player development for the New York Rangers of the National Hockey League (NHL) in the 2023-24 season.

On December 3, 2023, Mara was namedas an assistant coach on the staff of the AHL’s Hartford Wolf Pack.

On May 1, 2026, Mara was fired from the Hartford Wolf Pack's staff, alongside head coach, Grant Potulny, and fellow assistant coach, Jamie Tardif.

== Personal life ==
Mara was born in Ridgewood, New Jersey, and despite his birthplace, he is of no relation to the family of Wellington Mara, who were known for their ownership of the NFL's New York Giants. Mara was raised in Belmont, Massachusetts.

His older brother, Rob Mara, was drafted by the Chicago Blackhawks in eleventh round of the 1994 NHL entry draft.

== International play ==
Mara was a member of the 1996–97, 1997–98, and 1998–99 United States World Junior Championship teams. He also played for the United States at the 2004 World Championships in Prague, Czech Republic and won the bronze medal.

== Career statistics ==
=== Regular season and playoffs ===
			Regular season					Playoffs
Season	Team	League	GP	G	A	Pts	PIM	GP	G	A	Pts	PIM
1994–95	Belmont Hill School	HS-Prep	28	5	17	22	28	—	—	—	—	—
1995–96	Belmont Hill School	HS-Prep	28	18	20	38	40	—	—	—	—	—
1996–97	Sudbury Wolves	OHL	44	9	34	43	61	—	—	—	—	—
1997–98	Sudbury Wolves	OHL	25	8	18	26	79	—	—	—	—	—
1997–98	Plymouth Whalers	OHL	25	8	15	23	30	15	3	14	17	30
1998–99	Plymouth Whalers	OHL	52	13	41	54	95	11	5	7	12	28
1998–99	Tampa Bay Lightning	NHL	1	1	1	2	0	—	—	—	—	—
1999–2000	Detroit Vipers	IHL	15	3	5	8	22	—	—	—	—	—
1999–2000	Tampa Bay Lightning	NHL	54	7	11	18	73	—	—	—	—	—
2000–01	Detroit Vipers	IHL	10	3	3	6	22	—	—	—	—	—
2000–01	Tampa Bay Lightning	NHL	46	6	10	16	40	—	—	—	—	—
2000–01	Phoenix Coyotes	NHL	16	0	4	4	14	—	—	—	—	—
2001–02	Phoenix Coyotes	NHL	75	7	17	24	58	5	0	0	0	4
2002–03	Phoenix Coyotes	NHL	73	10	15	25	78	—	—	—	—	—
2003–04	Phoenix Coyotes	NHL	81	6	36	42	48	—	—	—	—	—
2004–05	Hannover Scorpions	DEL	35	5	13	18	89	—	—	—	—	—
2005–06	Phoenix Coyotes	NHL	78	15	32	47	70	—	—	—	—	—
2006–07	Boston Bruins	NHL	59	3	15	18	95	—	—	—	—	—
2006–07	New York Rangers	NHL	19	2	3	5	18	10	2	2	4	18
2007–08	New York Rangers	NHL	61	1	16	17	52	10	0	1	1	20
2008–09	New York Rangers	NHL	76	5	16	21	94	7	1	1	2	8
2009–10	Montreal Canadiens	NHL	42	0	8	8	48	—	—	—	—	—
2010–11	Anaheim Ducks	NHL	33	1	1	2	40	—	—	—	—	—
2010–11	Montreal Canadiens	NHL	20	0	4	4	48	1	0	0	0	0
2012–13	Ontario Reign	ECHL	28	1	17	18	75	—	—	—	—	—
2012–13	Houston Aeros	AHL	36	1	10	11	89	5	0	1	1	18
NHL totals			734	64	189	253	776	33	3	4	7	50

=== International ===
Medal record

Representing United States

Ice hockey

World Championships
Bronze medal – third place	2004 Prague	

World Junior Championships
Silver medal – second place	1997 Geneva	

Year	Team	Event	Result	GP	G	A	Pts	PIM
1997	United States	WJC	2nd place, silver medalist(s)	6	0	0	0	0
1998	United States	WJC	5th	7	1	1	2	6
1999	United States	WJC	8th	6	1	4	5	22
2004	United States	WC	3rd place, bronze medalist(s)	9	1	2	3	8
Junior totals				19	2	5	7	28
Senior totals				9	1	2	3	8

Preceded by Mario Larocque	Tampa Bay Lightning first-round draft pick 1997	Succeeded by Vincent Lecavalier
