= Jason Wiemer =

Canadian ice hockey player

- Born: April 14, 1976 (age 50) Kimberley, British Columbia, Canada
- Height: 6 ft 1 in (185 cm)
- Weight: 225 lb (102 kg; 16 st 1 lb)
- Position: Centre
- Shot: Left
- Played for: Tampa Bay Lightning; Calgary Flames; Florida Panthers; New York Islanders; Minnesota Wild; New Jersey Devils
- NHL draft: 8th overall, 1994; Tampa Bay Lightning
- Playing career: 1994–2006

Jason Earl Wiemer (born April 14, 1976) is a Canadian former professional ice hockey forward. He played for 11 seasons in the National Hockey League (NHL).

== Playing career ==
Wiemer was drafted 12th overall in the 1991 WHL Bantam Draft by the Portland Winterhawks. While with the Portland, he was drafted 8th overall by the Tampa Bay Lightning in the 1994 NHL entry draft.

After starting his fourth season with the Winterhawks in 1994–95, Wiemer turned professional after 16 games and made his NHL debut with Tampa Bay. After playing in four seasons with the Lightning and struggling with the weight of offensive expectations due to his junior career, Wiemer was traded at the deadline in the 1997–98 season to the Calgary Flames for Sandy McCarthy, a third round pick (Brad Richards) and a fifth round pick in the 1998 NHL entry draft on March 24, 1998.

Wiemer then played with the Flames for three seasons establishing himself as an effective enforcer and agitator due to his size, propensity for fighting and ability to deliver hits consistently.

Prior to the 2001–02 season, Wiemer was traded by the Flames, along with Valeri Bure, to the Florida Panthers for Rob Niedermayer on June 23, 2001. Jason recorded a career high 31 points in his lone season with Panthers before he was dealt to the New York Islanders for Branislav Mezei on July 3, 2002.

In 2003–04, his second season with the Islanders, Wiemer was claimed off waivers by the Minnesota Wild on November 13, 2003.

On August 5, 2004, Wiemer signed as a free agent with the Calgary Flames. On March 9, 2006, Wiemer was traded during the 2005–06 season from the Flames to the New Jersey Devils for a fourth round pick in the 2006 NHL entry draft. Reaching the playoffs for only the third time in his career, Weimer helped the Devils advance to the Conference semifinals.

In early July, 2006, Wiemer underwent reconstructive knee surgery missing the entire 2006–07 season for the Devils. Wiemer has not played professional hockey since. He played 726 career NHL games, scoring 90 goals and 112 assists for 202 points and also compiled 1,420 penalty minutes.

== Personal life ==
Wiemer married Lindsy Goodine in 2008. The couple has two children together, Owen and Michael.

== Career statistics ==
			Regular season					Playoffs
Season	Team	League	GP	G	A	Pts	PIM	GP	G	A	Pts	PIM
1991–92	Kimberley Dynamiters	RMJHL	45	33	33	66	211	—	—	—	—	—
1991–92	Portland Winterhawks	WHL	2	0	1	1	0	—	—	—	—	—
1992–93	Portland Winterhawks	WHL	68	18	34	52	159	16	7	3	10	27
1993–94	Portland Winterhawks	WHL	72	45	51	96	236	10	4	4	8	32
1994–95	Portland Winterhawks	WHL	16	10	14	24	63	—	—	—	—	—
1994–95	Tampa Bay Lightning	NHL	36	1	4	5	44	—	—	—	—	—
1995–96	Tampa Bay Lightning	NHL	66	9	9	18	81	6	1	0	1	28
1996–97	Adirondack Red Wings	AHL	4	1	0	1	7	—	—	—	—	—
1996–97	Tampa Bay Lightning	NHL	63	9	5	14	134	—	—	—	—	—
1997–98	Tampa Bay Lightning	NHL	67	8	9	17	132	—	—	—	—	—
1997–98	Calgary Flames	NHL	12	4	1	5	28	—	—	—	—	—
1998–99	Calgary Flames	NHL	78	8	13	21	177	—	—	—	—	—
1999–00	Calgary Flames	NHL	64	11	11	22	120	—	—	—	—	—
2000–01	Calgary Flames	NHL	65	10	5	15	177	—	—	—	—	—
2001–02	Florida Panthers	NHL	70	11	20	31	178	—	—	—	—	—
2002–03	New York Islanders	NHL	81	9	19	28	116	5	0	0	0	23
2003–04	New York Islanders	NHL	13	1	3	4	24	—	—	—	—	—
2003–04	Minnesota Wild	NHL	62	7	11	18	106	—	—	—	—	—
2005–06	Calgary Flames	NHL	33	1	2	3	65	—	—	—	—	—
2005–06	New Jersey Devils	NHL	16	1	0	1	38	8	0	0	0	16
NHL totals			726	90	112	202	1420	19	1	0	1	67

Awards and achievements
Preceded by Chris Gratton	Tampa Bay Lightning first-round draft pick 1994	Succeeded by Daymond Langkow
