= Andy Rogers (ice hockey) =

Canadian ice hockey player (born 1986)

- Born: August 25, 1986 (age 40) Calgary, Alberta, Canada
- Height: 6 ft 5 in (196 cm)
- Weight: 206 lb (93 kg; 14 st 10 lb)
- Position: Defence
- Shot: Left
- Played for: Springfield Falcons; Norfolk Admirals; Toronto Marlies
- NHL draft: 30th overall, 2004; Tampa Bay Lightning
- Playing career: 2006–2010

Andy Rogers (born August 25, 1986) is a Canadian former professional ice hockey defenceman. He was drafted in the first round, 30th overall, by the Tampa Bay Lightning in the 2004 NHL entry draft.

== Playing career ==
Rogers played for the Western Hockey League's Calgary Hitmen from 2003–2005, and for the Prince George Cougars from 2005–06.

Rogers made his pro debut in the 2006–07 season with the Lightning's AHL affiliate, the Springfield Falcons. He was traded on March 4, 2009 along with Olaf Kolzig, Jamie Heward and a fourth-round draft pick to the Toronto Maple Leafs for Richard Petiot. Rogers was then sent down to their AHL farm club, the Toronto Marlies.

On October 4, 2009, Rogers was re-signed by the Marlies under a professional try-out contract. After going scoreless through six games, he was released from his contract on December 10, 2009. He then played 11 games with the Victoria Salmon Kings of the ECHL before hanging up his skates.

== Career statistics ==
=== Regular season and playoffs ===
			Regular season					Playoffs
Season	Team	League	GP	G	A	Pts	PIM	GP	G	A	Pts	PIM
2002–03	Calgary Hitmen	WHL	25	0	3	3	17	—	—	—	—	—
2003–04	Calgary Hitmen	WHL	64	1	3	4	89	7	0	0	0	11
2004–05	Calgary Hitmen	WHL	18	1	4	5	36	—	—	—	—	—
2004–05	Prince George Cougars	WHL	30	1	5	6	49	—	—	—	—	—
2005–06	Prince George Cougars	WHL	21	0	3	3	51	—	—	—	—	—
2006–07	Springfield Falcons	AHL	48	0	7	7	39	—	—	—	—	—
2007–08	Mississippi Sea Wolves	ECHL	4	1	0	1	10	—	—	—	—	—
2007–08	Norfolk Admirals	AHL	30	0	1	1	35	—	—	—	—	—
2008–09	Norfolk Admirals	AHL	34	0	2	2	38	—	—	—	—	—
2008–09	Toronto Marlies	AHL	1	0	0	0	0	2	0	0	0	2
2009–10	Toronto Marlies	AHL	6	0	0	0	29	—	—	—	—	—
2009–10	Victoria Salmon Kings	ECHL	11	0	1	1	8	—	—	—	—	—
AHL totals			119	0	10	10	141	—	—	—	—	—

=== International ===
Year	Team	Event	Result	GP	G	A	Pts	PIM
2004	Canada	WJC18	4th	7	1	2	3	26
Junior totals				7	1	2	3	26

Awards and achievements
Preceded by Alexander Svitov	Tampa Bay Lightning first-round draft pick 2004	Succeeded by Vladimír Mihálik
