= Riku Helenius =

Finnish ice hockey player (born 1988)

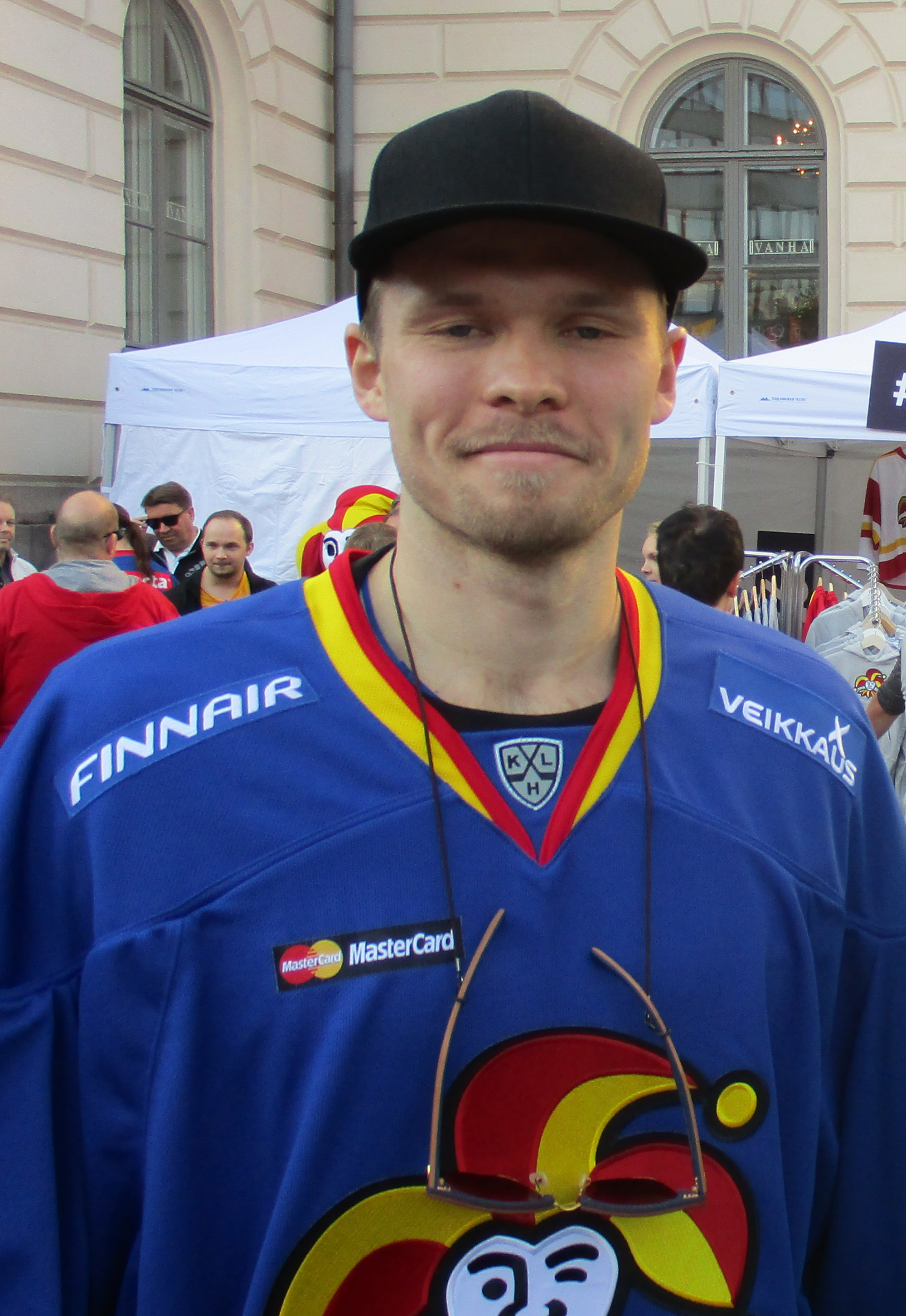
- Helenius in 2016
- Born: March 1, 1988 (age 38) Pälkäne, Finland
- Height: 6 ft 3 in (191 cm)
- Weight: 183 lb (83 kg; 13 st 1 lb)
- Position: Goaltender
- Caught: Left
- DEL2 team: Dresdner Eislöwen
- Played for: Tampa Bay Lightning; Södertälje SK; JYP Jyväskylä; Jokerit; KalPa; Ilves; Lahti Pelicans
- NHL draft: 15th overall, 2006; Tampa Bay Lightning
- Playing career: 2008–2021

Riku Helenius (born March 1, 1988) is a Finnish former professional ice hockey goaltender.

== Playing career ==
Helenius was selected 15th overall in the 2006 NHL entry draft by the Tampa Bay Lightning, partly on the strength of his silver medal-winning performance for the Finnish national men's hockey team in the 2006 under-18 World Junior Championships. He played for Ilves during the 2006–07 season, but due to a shoulder injury only played four games.

The Seattle Thunderbirds selected Helenius with the 46th overall selection in the 2007 Canadian Hockey League Import Draft. Helenius joined the Thunderbirds roster at the start of the 2007–2008 season. In December 2007, Helenius was selected as goalie for the Finnish World Junior Team in the 2008 IIHF World Junior Championships.

On October 17, 2008, Helenius was assigned to the Augusta Lynx of the ECHL. He played his first NHL game on January 30, 2009, against the Philadelphia Flyers.

In 2009, he went on to play for Södertälje SK after playing just 10 games for the Norfolk Admirals.

For the 2011–12 season he returned to Finland and signed with JYP Jyväskylä of the SM-liiga, where he won the league championship and the Urpo Ylönen trophy for best goaltender.

After a great season in Finland, Steve Yzerman, General Manager of the Tampa Bay Lightning, expressed interest in bringing Helenius back to North America, as he was still a Lightning prospect. On June 13, 2012, Helenius signed a two-year contract with the Lightning.

In the midst of the 2013–14 season, with Helenius unable to make an impact up the Lightning's depth chart, on February 22, 2014, he was placed on $125 unconditional waivers, which would bring his contract with the Tampa Bay Lightning to an mutual end.

On April 14, 2014, Helenius agreed to a multi-year contract with Finnish club Jokerit of the KHL.

== Career statistics ==
=== Regular season and playoffs ===
			Regular season									Playoffs
Season	Team	League	GP	W	L	OTL	MIN	GA	SO	GAA	SV%	GP	W	L	MIN	GA	SO	GAA	SV%
2007–08	Seattle Thunderbirds	WHL	41	22	12	6	2358	95	3	2.42	.915	9	4	5	534	24	0	2.70	.911
2008–09	Augusta Lynx	ECHL	8	3	4	1	463	34	0	4.41	.874	—	—	—	—	—	—	—	—
2008–09	Mississippi Sea Wolves	ECHL	3	1	1	1	184	7	0	2.28	.944	—	—	—	—	—	—	—	—
2008–09	Norfolk Admirals	AHL	25	9	15	0	1388	63	1	2.72	.918	—	—	—	—	—	—	—	—
2008–09	Tampa Bay Lightning	NHL	1	0	0	0	7	0	0	0.00	1.000	—	—	—	—	—	—	—	—
2008–09	Elmira Jackals	ECHL	—	—	—	—	—	—	—	—	—	2	0	1	87	10	0	6.90	.787
2009–10	Norfolk Admirals	AHL	12	5	7	0	719	33	0	2.75	.896	—	—	—	—	—	—	—	—
2009–10	Sodertalje SK	SEL	9	—	—	—	545	22	0	2.42	.922	—	—	—	—	—	—	—	—
2010–11	Sodertalje SK	SEL	18	—	—	—	911	46	0	3.03	.884	—	—	—	—	—	—	—	—
2011–12	JYP	FIN	33	17	9	5	1908	52	7	1.64	.936	13	11	2	833	24	0	1.73	—
2012–13	Syracuse Crunch	AHL	32	17	14	0	1772	76	4	2.57	.900	—	—	—	—	—	—	—	—
2013–14	Syracuse Crunch	AHL	5	2	3	0	297	17	0	3.43	.875	—	—	—	—	—	—	—	—
2013–14	Florida Everblades	ECHL	4	0	2	0	148	15	0	6.08	.797	—	—	—	—	—	—	—	—
2014–15	Jokerit	KHL	22	14	5	2	1272	50	2	2.36	.918	1	1	0	60	1	0	1.00	.944
2015–16	Jokerit	KHL	21	7	6	4	1045	42	2	2.41	.891	—	—	—	—	—	—	—	—
2016–17	Jokerit	KHL	20	10	6	4	1219	54	0	2.66	.902	—	—	—	—	—	—	—	—
2017–18	KalPa	FIN	4	0	4	0	235	11	0	2.80	.899	—	—	—	—	—	—	—	—
2017–18	Ilves	FIN	27	12	9	4	1514	71	1	2.81	.889	—	—	—	—	—	—	—	—
2018–19	Ilves	FIN	32	12	11	8	1845	86	2	2.69	.885	—	—	—	—	—	—	—	—
2019–20	JYP	FIN	1	0	1	0	60	5	0	5.00	.773	—	—	—	—	—	—	—	—
2019–20	Lahti Pelicans	FIN	3	0	1	0	98	10	0	6.13	.760	—	—	—	—	—	—	—	—
NHL totals			1	0	0	0	7	0	0	0.00	1.000	—	—	—	—	—	—	—	—

=== International ===
Year	Team	Event	Result	GP	W	L	T	MIN	GA	SO	GAA	SV%
2006	Finland	WJC18	2nd place, silver medalist(s)	6	4	1	1	360	11	1	1.83	.942
2008	Finland	WJC	6th	4	—	—	—	214	12	1	3.36	.902
Junior totals				10	—	—	—	574	23	2	—	—

Awards and achievements
Preceded by Vladimír Mihálik	Tampa Bay Lightning first-round draft pick 2006	Succeeded by Steven Stamkos
