= Vladimír Mihálik =

Slovak ice hockey player (born 1987)

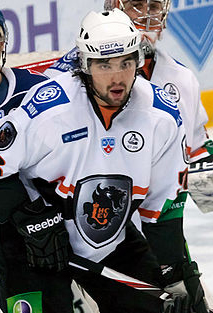
- Born: 29 January 1987 (age 39) Prešov, Czechoslovakia
- Height: 6 ft 7 in (201 cm)
- Weight: 240 lb (109 kg; 17 st 2 lb)
- Position: Defence
- Shoots: Left
- Slovak team Former teams: HC Prešov; Norfolk Admirals; Tampa Bay Lightning; HC Lev Poprad; Timrå IK; HC Slovan Bratislava; HC ’05 Banská Bystrica; HK Dukla Michalovce; HC Košice
- National team: Slovakia
- NHL draft: 30th overall, 2005; Tampa Bay Lightning
- Playing career: 2007–present

Vladimír Mihálik (born 29 January 1987) is a Slovak professional ice hockey defenceman who currently playing for HC Prešov of the Slovak 1. Liga.

== Playing career ==
Mihálik was drafted in the first round, 30th overall, in the 2005 NHL entry draft by the Tampa Bay Lightning. He was the last Slovakian taken in the first round until Marko Dano eight years later. The 6'8", 246 lb Mihálik came to North America to play junior hockey in 2005, with the Red Deer Rebels of the Western Hockey League. For the 2006–07 season, he moved to the Prince George Cougars producing 26 points in 51 games before signing a three-year entry-level contract with the Lightning on 6 April 2007.

He started his pro career in the 2007–08 season with the Norfolk Admirals of the American Hockey League posting 16 points as a rookie. Mihálik was promoted to the Tampa Bay Lightning for the start of the 2008–09.

He was signed by Lev Poprad on 14 July 2011. After only scoring 4 points in 34 games, he signed with Timrå IK of the Swedish Elitserien (SEL) on 28 January 2012.

== Career statistics ==
=== Regular season and playoffs ===
			Regular season					Playoffs
Season	Team	League	GP	G	A	Pts	PIM	GP	G	A	Pts	PIM
2003–04	PHK Prešov	SVK U18	44	2	11	13	66	—	—	—	—	—
2004–05	PHK Prešov	SVK U20	23	6	10	16	44	—	—	—	—	—
2004–05	PHK Prešov	SVK.2	32	3	1	4	24	6	0	1	1	2
2005–06	Red Deer Rebels	WHL	62	3	9	12	86	—	—	—	—	—
2006–07	Prince George Cougars	WHL	53	7	19	26	91	15	1	2	3	17
2007–08	Norfolk Admirals	AHL	68	1	15	16	68	—	—	—	—	—
2008–09	Tampa Bay Lightning	NHL	11	0	3	3	6	—	—	—	—	—
2008–09	Norfolk Admirals	AHL	61	2	13	15	58	—	—	—	—	—
2009–10	Norfolk Admirals	AHL	75	2	16	18	67	—	—	—	—	—
2009–10	Tampa Bay Lightning	NHL	4	0	0	0	2	—	—	—	—	—
2010–11	Norfolk Admirals	AHL	66	1	8	9	107	6	0	2	2	8
2011–12	HC Lev Poprad	KHL	37	1	4	5	37	—	—	—	—	—
2011–12	Timrå IK	SEL	13	0	3	3	14	—	—	—	—	—
2012–13	HC Slovan Bratislava	KHL	15	2	0	2	16	4	1	0	1	4
2013–14	HC Slovan Bratislava	KHL	38	2	3	5	20	—	—	—	—	—
2014–15	HC Slovan Bratislava	KHL	33	2	1	3	28	—	—	—	—	—
2015–16	HC Slovan Bratislava	KHL	49	1	3	4	53	4	0	0	0	4
2016–17	HC ’05 iClinic Banská Bystrica	SVK	52	2	9	11	22	14	0	0	0	8
2017–18	HC ’05 iClinic Banská Bystrica	SVK	47	4	9	13	20	16	0	1	1	20
2018–19	HC ’05 iClinic Banská Bystrica	SVK	49	4	10	14	42	16	0	2	2	8
2019–20	HC ’05 iClinic Banská Bystrica	SVK	53	3	10	13	18	—	—	—	—	—
2020–21	HK Dukla Michalovce	SVK	48	5	12	17	36	12	0	1	1	6
2021–22	HK Dukla Michalovce	SVK	26	1	2	3	12	6	1	0	1	4
2022–23	HK Dukla Michalovce	SVK	43	1	3	4	18	18	1	1	2	10
2023–24	HK Dukla Michalovce	SVK	16	0	5	5	6	—	—	—	—	—
NHL totals			15	0	3	3	8	—	—	—	—	—
KHL totals			172	8	11	19	154	8	1	0	1	8

=== International ===
Year	Team	Event	Result	GP	G	A	Pts	PIM
2005	Slovakia	WJC18	6th	6	0	0	0	10
2006	Slovakia	WJC	8th	6	0	3	3	8
2007	Slovakia	WJC	8th	6	1	0	1	4
2010	Slovakia	WC	12th	6	1	0	1	4
2013	Slovakia	WC	8th	8	0	1	1	4
2014	Slovakia	WC	9th	2	0	0	0	0
Junior totals				18	1	3	4	22
Senior totals				16	1	1	2	18

Awards and achievements
Preceded by Andy Rogers	Tampa Bay Lightning first-round draft pick 2005	Succeeded by Riku Helenius
