= Mario Larocque =

Canadian ice hockey player (born 1978)

- Born: April 24, 1978 (age 47) Montreal, Quebec, Canada
- Height: 6 ft 4 in (193 cm)
- Weight: 220 lb (100 kg; 15 st 10 lb)
- Position: Defence
- Shot: Left
- Played for: Tampa Bay Lightning; Cleveland Lumberjacks; Detroit Vipers; Rochester Americans; Wheeling Nailers; Wilkes-Barre/Scranton Penguins; Danbury Trashers; Bridgeport Sound Tigers; Fort Wayne Komets; HC TWK Innsbruck; SG Pontebba; Nottingham Panthers; Muskegon Lumberjacks; Evansville Icemen; Elmira Jackals; Arizona Sundogs; Braehead Clan; Stockton Thunder
- NHL draft: 16th overall, 1996; Tampa Bay Lightning
- Playing career: 1998–2015

Mario Larocque (born April 24, 1978) is a Canadian former professional ice hockey defenceman.

== Playing career ==
As a youth, Larocque played in the 1992 Quebec International Pee-Wee Hockey Tournament with a minor ice hockey team from Montreal.

Larocque was drafted in the first round, 16th overall by the Tampa Bay Lightning in 1996. He managed to play five NHL games for the Lightning during the 1998–99 NHL season, scoring no points with 16 penalty minutes. He spent the rest of that season in the International Hockey League with the Cleveland Lumberjacks before playing two seasons with the Detroit Vipers of the same league. After the IHL folded, he was signed by the Buffalo Sabres but was assigned to the American Hockey League with the Rochester Americans and never saw any ice time with the Sabres.

He spent the next five seasons in the ECHL with the Wheeling Nailers and the United Hockey League with the Danbury Trashers and the Fort Wayne Komets, along with brief spells in the AHL for the Wilkes-Barre/Scranton Penguins and the Bridgeport Sound Tigers. In 2007, he joined Austrian team HC TWK Innsbruck and in September 2008 he signed with Sport Ghiaccio Pontebba. He then joined the EC Red Bull Salzburg on December 1, 2008, and later signed with the Nottingham Panthers on November 5, 2009.

Larocque signed with the Muskegon Lumberjacks on February 12, 2010. Larocque joined the Evansville IceMen in October 2010, after the team relocated from Muskegon, for his 13th pro season and first full campaign under Head Coach Rich Kromm after finishing last season with Kromm in Muskegon.

On January 15, 2014, Larocque opted for another venture abroad signing for the remainder of the season with the Braehead Clan of the EIHL.

== Career statistics ==
			Regular season					Playoffs
Season	Team	League	GP	G	A	Pts	PIM	GP	G	A	Pts	PIM
1994–95	Collège Français Bourassa	QMAAA	43	0	6	6	53	—	—	—	—	—
1995–96	Hull Olympiques	QMJHL	68	7	19	26	196	14	2	5	7	16
1996–97	Hull Olympiques	QMJHL	64	13	37	50	160	14	2	5	7	34
1997–98	Sherbrooke Faucons	QMJHL	28	6	10	16	125	—	—	—	—	—
1998–99	Tampa Bay Lightning	NHL	5	0	0	0	16	—	—	—	—	—
1998–99	Cleveland Lumberjacks	IHL	59	5	7	12	202	—	—	—	—	—
1999–2000	Detroit Vipers	IHL	60	0	5	5	234	—	—	—	—	—
2000–01	Detroit Vipers	IHL	71	2	1	3	233	—	—	—	—	—
2001–02	Rochester Americans	AHL	75	8	7	15	219	2	0	0	0	0
2002–03	Wheeling Nailers	ECHL	66	18	26	44	194	—	—	—	—	—
2003–04	Wilkes-Barre/Scranton Penguins	AHL	3	0	0	0	4	—	—	—	—	—
2003–04	Wheeling Nailers	ECHL	66	13	22	35	166	5	1	2	3	12
2004–05	Danbury Trashers	UHL	68	6	26	32	271	11	3	3	6	24
2005–06	Bridgeport Sound Tigers	AHL	5	0	0	0	11	—	—	—	—	—
2005–06	Danbury Trashers	UHL	46	5	10	15	187	18	0	11	11	40
2006–07	Fort Wayne Komets	UHL	76	27	40	67	231	10	2	5	7	40
2007–08	HC Innsbruck	EBEL	37	8	9	17	123	—	—	—	—	—
2008–09	SG Pontebba	ITA	15	4	4	8	73	—	—	—	—	—
2008–09	EC Red Bull Salzburg II	AUT.2	12	1	7	8	86	4	1	1	2	33
2009–10	Nottingham Panthers	EIHL	21	2	5	7	80	—	—	—	—	—
2009–10	Muskegon Lumberjacks	IHL	31	5	19	24	57	6	1	2	3	30
2010–11	Evansville IceMen	CHL	64	17	27	44	151	—	—	—	—	—
2011–12	Elmira Jackals	ECHL	69	7	38	45	140	7	1	4	5	18
2012–13	Arizona Sundogs	CHL	49	7	15	22	118	4	2	2	4	6
2013–14	Braehead Clan	EIHL	16	2	6	8	36	3	0	1	1	8
2014–15	Stockton Thunder	ECHL	35	4	9	13	127	—	—	—	—	—
NHL totals			5	0	0	0	16	—	—	—	—	—
UHL/IHL totals			221	43	95	138	746	45	6	21	27	134
ECHL totals			236	42	95	137	627	12	2	6	8	30

Awards and achievements
Preceded by Daymond Langkow	Tampa Bay Lightning first-round draft pick 1996	Succeeded by Paul Mara
