= Jamie Heward =

Canadian ice hockey player (born 1971)

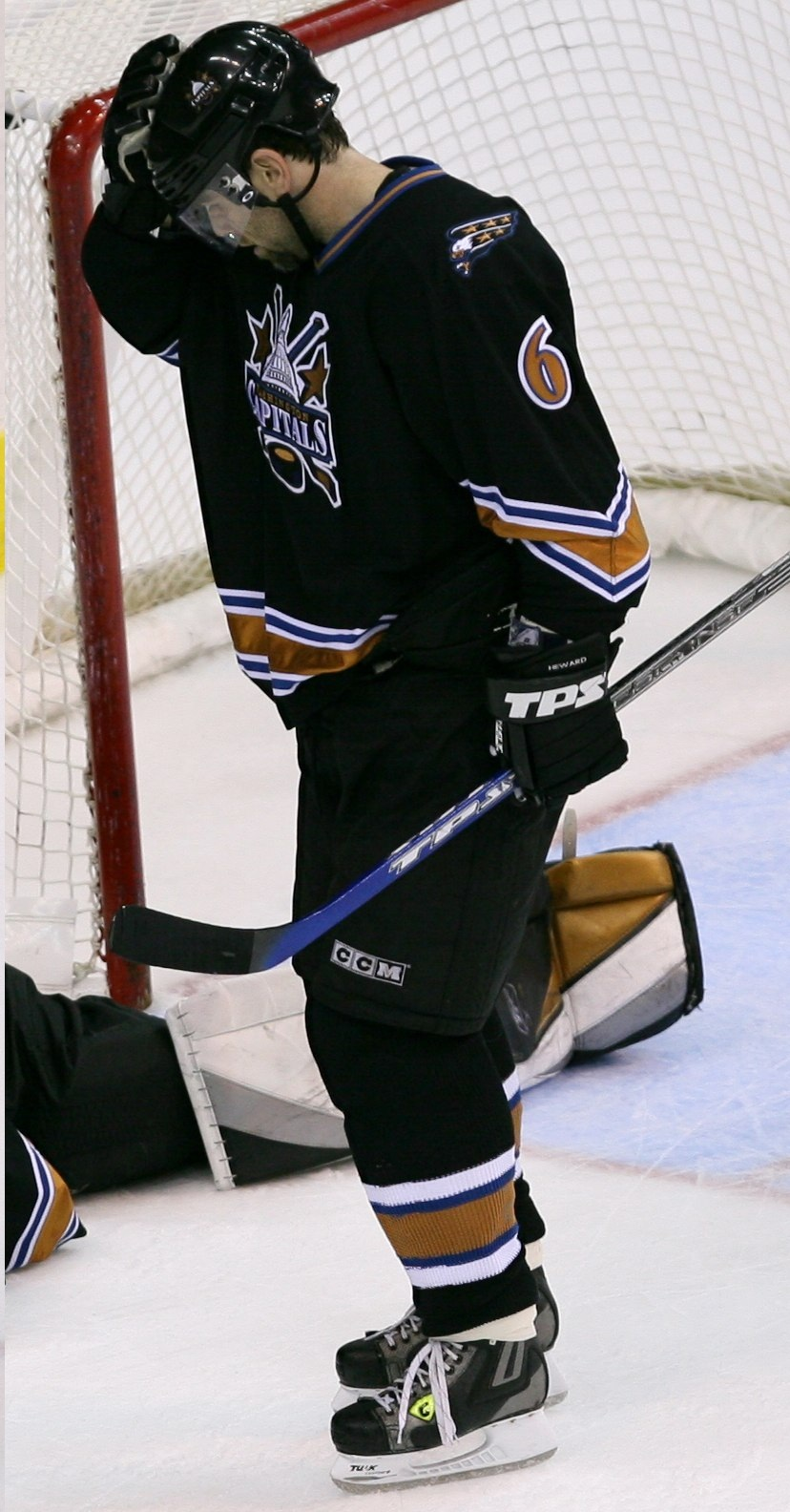
- Born: March 30, 1971 (age 55) Regina, Saskatchewan, Canada
- Height: 6 ft 2 in (188 cm)
- Weight: 207 lb (94 kg; 14 st 11 lb)
- Position: Defence
- Shot: Right
- Played for: Toronto Maple Leafs; Nashville Predators; New York Islanders; Columbus Blue Jackets; Washington Capitals; Los Angeles Kings; Tampa Bay Lightning
- National team: Canada
- NHL draft: 16th overall, 1989; Pittsburgh Penguins
- Playing career: 1991–2009

Jamie Heward
Medal record

Men's ice hockey

Representing Canada

World Championships
| Bronze medal – third place | 1995 Sweden | Ice hockey |
| Gold medal – first place | 2003 Finland | Ice hockey |
| Gold medal – first place | 2004 Czech Republic | Ice hockey |
| Silver medal – second place | 2005 Austria | Ice hockey |

James Heward (born March 30, 1971) is a Canadian former professional ice hockey defenceman, who currently serves as an associate coach for the Henderson Silver Knights.

== Playing career ==
Heward was drafted by the Pittsburgh Penguins in the first round, 16th overall, of the 1989 NHL entry draft. After several seasons in the Penguins organization without getting called up to the NHL, Heward became an unrestricted free agent and spent the 1994–95 season with the Canadian National Team scoring 5 assists in 8 games at the 1995 World Championships.

After the World Championships ended, Heward signed a contract with the Toronto Maple Leafs on May 4, 1995. Heward spent most of the 1995–96 season with Toronto's AHL affiliate the St. John's Maple Leafs before spending 5 games with the parent club in February 1996. Heward made his NHL debut against the Montreal Canadiens on February 3, 1996, recording 4 shots. Heward again spent the majority of the 1996–97 season in the AHL, however during 20 games with the Maple Leafs, Heward scored his first career NHL goal (and point) on November 2, 1996, against Mike Vernon and the Detroit Red Wings.

On July 31, 1997, Heward signed a free agent contract with the Philadelphia Flyers but spent the entire season with their AHL affiliate the Philadelphia Phantoms.

In 1998–99, Heward finally found a regular NHL job scoring 18 points in 63 games with the expansion Nashville Predators. After the Predators declined to make Heward a qualifying offer, he signed a two-way free agent deal with the New York Islanders in July 1999. He spent the 1999–2000 season with the team, then was claimed on waivers by the Columbus Blue Jackets on May 26, 2000. Heward played 97 games with Columbus during the 2000–01 and 2001–02 seasons, scoring 30 points, but was not re-signed.

After 3 seasons in Switzerland, Heward signed a 1-year free-agent contract with the Washington Capitals at the end of the 2004-05 NHL lockout, and recorded a career-high 28 points for Washington. The 1-year contract was extended on February 22, 2006, for the 2006–07 season. On February 27, 2007, the Capitals traded Heward to the Los Angeles Kings for a conditional fifth round pick in the 2007 NHL draft. After the season ended, Heward signed a deal with SKA St. Petersburg of the Russian League on August 13, 2007. On September 16, 2008, the Tampa Bay Lightning invited Heward to training camp and signed him to a 1-year deal on October 3, 2008.

On March 4, 2009, in an attempt to dump salary, the Lightning traded goaltender Olaf Kolzig, Heward, prospect Andy Rogers and a fourth round draft pick to the Toronto Maple Leafs for prospect Richard Petiot. At the date of his trade to the Maple Leafs, he had been sidelined indefinitely with a concussion.

In 2010, Heward was inducted into the Regina Sports Hall of Fame.

== Coaching career ==
On August 23, 2012, Heward was named the Assistant Coach and Director of Player Development for the Swift Current Broncos of the Western Hockey League (WHL). After six years with the Broncos, Heward was named the associate coach for the Vancouver Giants of the WHL on July 23, 2018.

Internationally, Heward has served as an Assistant Coach for Team Canada for the World U-17 Hockey Challenge tournaments in 2015 and 2016.

== Personal life ==
Heward and his family currently reside in Vancouver, British Columbia.

== Career statistics ==
=== Regular season and playoffs ===
| | | | Regular season | | | | | Playoffs |
| Season | Team | League | GP | G | A | Pts | PIM | GP | G | A | Pts | PIM |
|---|---|---|---|---|---|---|---|---|---|---|---|---|
| 1987–88 | Regina Pats | WHL | 68 | 10 | 17 | 27 | 17 | 4 | 1 | 1 | 2 | 2 |
| 1988–89 | Regina Pats | WHL | 52 | 31 | 28 | 59 | 29 | — | — | — | — | — |
| 1989–90 | Regina Pats | WHL | 72 | 14 | 44 | 58 | 42 | 11 | 2 | 2 | 4 | 10 |
| 1990–91 | Regina Pats | WHL | 71 | 23 | 61 | 84 | 41 | 8 | 2 | 9 | 11 | 6 |
| 1991–92 | Muskegon Lumberjacks | IHL | 54 | 6 | 21 | 27 | 37 | 14 | 1 | 4 | 5 | 4 |
| 1992–93 | Cleveland Lumberjacks | IHL | 58 | 9 | 18 | 27 | 64 | — | — | — | — | — |
| 1993–94 | Cleveland Lumberjacks | IHL | 73 | 8 | 16 | 24 | 72 | — | — | — | — | — |
| 1994–95 | Canada | Intl | 51 | 11 | 35 | 46 | 32 | — | — | — | — | — |
| 1995–96 | St. John's Maple Leafs | AHL | 73 | 22 | 34 | 56 | 33 | 3 | 1 | 1 | 2 | 6 |
| 1995–96 | Toronto Maple Leafs | NHL | 5 | 0 | 0 | 0 | 0 | — | — | — | — | — |
| 1996–97 | St. John's Maple Leafs | AHL | 27 | 8 | 19 | 27 | 26 | 9 | 1 | 3 | 4 | 6 |
| 1996–97 | Toronto Maple Leafs | NHL | 20 | 1 | 4 | 5 | 6 | — | — | — | — | — |
| 1997–98 | Philadelphia Phantoms | AHL | 72 | 17 | 48 | 65 | 54 | 20 | 3 | 16 | 19 | 10 |
| 1998–99 | Nashville Predators | NHL | 63 | 6 | 12 | 18 | 44 | — | — | — | — | — |
| 1999–2000 | New York Islanders | NHL | 54 | 6 | 11 | 17 | 26 | — | — | — | — | — |
| 2000–01 | Columbus Blue Jackets | NHL | 69 | 11 | 16 | 27 | 33 | — | — | — | — | — |
| 2001–02 | Columbus Blue Jackets | NHL | 28 | 1 | 2 | 3 | 7 | — | — | — | — | — |
| 2001–02 | Syracuse Crunch | AHL | 14 | 3 | 10 | 13 | 6 | 10 | 0 | 4 | 4 | 6 |
| 2002–03 | Genève–Servette HC | NLA | 39 | 8 | 23 | 31 | 60 | 6 | 1 | 1 | 2 | 22 |
| 2003–04 | ZSC Lions | NLA | 25 | 5 | 9 | 14 | 57 | 6 | 0 | 1 | 1 | 24 |
| 2004–05 | SCL Tigers | NLA | 44 | 3 | 14 | 17 | 83 | — | — | — | — | — |
| 2005–06 | Washington Capitals | NHL | 71 | 7 | 21 | 28 | 54 | — | — | — | — | — |
| 2006–07 | Washington Capitals | NHL | 52 | 4 | 12 | 16 | 27 | — | — | — | — | — |
| 2006–07 | Los Angeles Kings | NHL | 19 | 2 | 6 | 8 | 20 | — | — | — | — | — |
| 2007–08 | SKA St. Petersburg | RSL | 53 | 2 | 15 | 17 | 98 | 9 | 2 | 0 | 2 | 10 |
| 2008–09 | Norfolk Admirals | AHL | 20 | 6 | 8 | 14 | 25 | — | — | — | — | — |
| 2008–09 | Tampa Bay Lightning | NHL | 13 | 0 | 2 | 2 | 4 | — | — | — | — | — |
| IHL totals | | | 185 | 23 | 55 | 78 | 173 | 14 | 1 | 4 | 5 | 4 |
| AHL totals | | | 206 | 56 | 119 | 175 | 144 | 42 | 5 | 24 | 29 | 28 |
| NHL totals | | | 394 | 38 | 86 | 124 | 221 | — | — | — | — | — |

=== International ===
| Year | Team | Event | GP | G | A | Pts | PIM |
|---|---|---|---|---|---|---|---|
| 1995 | Canada | WC | 8 | 0 | 5 | 5 | 6 |
| 2003 | Canada | WC | 9 | 0 | 0 | 0 | 2 |
| 2004 | Canada | WC | DNP | — | — | — | — |
| 2005 | Canada | WC | DNP | — | — | — | — |
| Senior totals | | | 17 | 0 | 5 | 5 | 8 |

== Awards ==
- WHL East First All-Star Team – 1991

| Preceded by Darrin Shannon | Pittsburgh Penguins first-round draft pick 1989 | Succeeded by Jaromír Jágr |
