= Chris Gratton =

Canadian ice hockey player (born 1975)

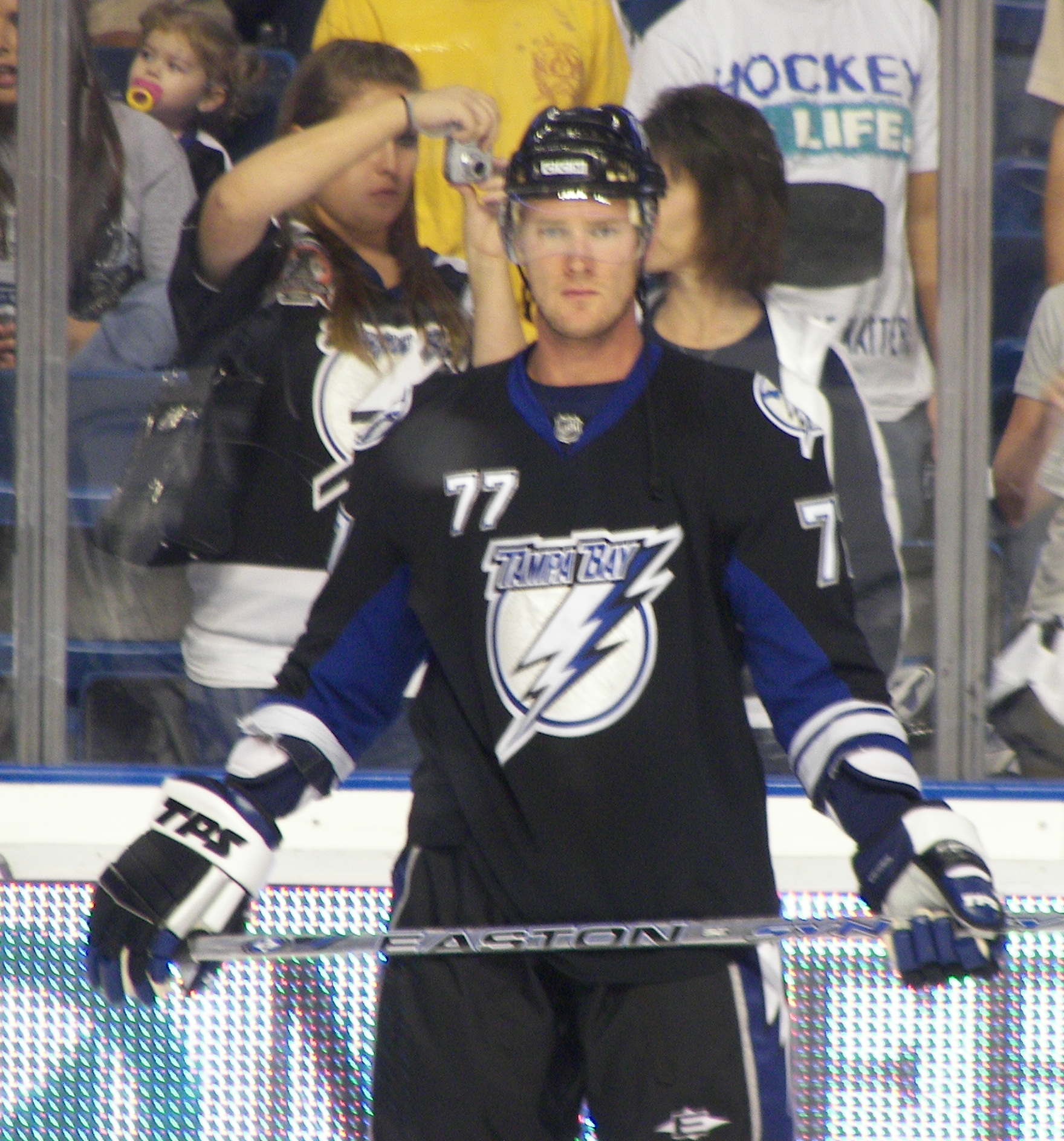
- Gratton with the Tampa Bay Lightning in 2007
- Born: July 5, 1975 (age 50) Brantford, Ontario, Canada
- Height: 6 ft 4 in (193 cm)
- Weight: 230 lb (104 kg; 16 st 6 lb)
- Position: Centre
- Shot: Left
- Played for: Tampa Bay Lightning; Philadelphia Flyers; Buffalo Sabres; Phoenix Coyotes; Colorado Avalanche; Florida Panthers; Columbus Blue Jackets
- National team: Canada
- NHL draft: 3rd overall, 1993; Tampa Bay Lightning
- Playing career: 1993–2009

Christopher Allan Gratton (born July 5, 1975) is a Canadian former professional ice hockey player who last played with the Columbus Blue Jackets of the National Hockey League (NHL). He is the cousin of Josh Gratton, who had also briefly played in the NHL as a member of the Philadelphia Flyers and the Phoenix Coyotes.

== Early life ==
Gratton's father coached him for one season during his youth.

== Playing career ==
=== Junior hockey ===
Gratton played his minor hockey in his hometown of Brantford, Ontario, playing for such programs as the Brantford Nodrofsky Steelers (the same program Wayne Gretzky played in many years earlier) and the Brantford CKPC Knights. As a 15-year-old, he played one season with the Jr B Brantford Classics.

In 1991, Gratton was selected third overall in the OHL Priority Selection by the Kingston Frontenacs. After his rookie year in the OHL, Gratton received the Emms Family Award as rookie of the year. In 1993, he was selected third overall in the NHL Draft by the Tampa Bay Lightning.

=== Tampa Bay Lightning ===
Gratton made his NHL debut for the Lightning on October 6, 1993, against the New Jersey Devils. He recorded his first career NHL point (a powerplay assist on a Bob Beers goal) in his second game against the New York Rangers the next night. He scored his first career NHL goal against Robb Stauber of the Los Angeles Kings in a 4–3 Lightning loss on October 20, 1993

=== Philadelphia Flyers ===
In 1997, Gratton signed with the Philadelphia Flyers as a free agent after four seasons with the Lightning, earning a $9 million signing bonus. In 1997–98, Gratton matched his career-high of 62 points and recorded a career-best plus/minus rating of +11. Gratton was traded back to Tampa Bay the next season.

=== Second stint with Lightning ===
Gratton served as Tampa Bay's captain during the 1999–2000 season until his trade in March, 2000, when Tampa Bay traded him to the Buffalo Sabres.

=== Buffalo Sabres ===
Gratton arrived in Buffalo, along with Doug Gilmour, near the trade deadline of the 1999–2000 season. Buffalo added both with the hope that they could revive the team's fortunes and propel them to the Stanley Cup playoffs. The Sabres eventually did qualify for the 2000 playoffs, but were eliminated in five games by the Philadelphia Flyers in the first round.

Gratton eventually played three seasons with the Sabres, scoring at least 15 goals in each year. In his first full season with Buffalo, he recorded 19 goals and again helped the Sabres reach the playoffs. He notched five goals in helping the Sabres beat the Flyers in the first round, though his production dipped to a single goal in the next round against the Pittsburgh Penguins as the Sabres were eliminated in seven games.

Gratton would still be productive in his final two years in Buffalo, though the team failed to reach the playoffs. His final year in Buffalo was his most productive, reaching 44 points and 15 goals in 66 games, good enough for second in team scoring behind Miroslav Šatan.

=== Phoenix Coyotes ===
Gratton would play for the Sabres until March 2003, when the Sabres traded him to the Phoenix Coyotes in exchange for Daniel Brière. One year later, on March 9, 2004, Phoenix traded Gratton (along with Ossi Väänänen and a second-round draft pick that was ultimately used to select Paul Stastny in the 2005 NHL entry draft) to the Colorado Avalanche in exchange for Derek Morris and Keith Ballard.

=== Florida Panthers ===
After the 2004–05 NHL lockout, Gratton signed a one-year contract with the Florida Panthers. Gratton signed a two-year contract extension with the Panthers in March 2006. He was traded back to the Tampa Bay Lightning again on June 13, 2007, in exchange for a second-round draft pick (ultimately used to select Jacob Markström).

=== Return to Tampa Bay Lightning ===
During the 2007–08 season, Gratton scored 21 points in 60 games before tearing the acetabular labrum in his left hip which required season-ending surgery. Gratton re-signed with the Lightning for the 2008–09 season but was waived in December and was assigned to Tampa Bay's American Hockey League (AHL) affiliate, the Norfolk Admirals.

=== Columbus Blue Jackets ===
Gratton was claimed off of re-entry waivers on February 21, 2009, by the Columbus Blue Jackets. He played in six games for Columbus, recording an assist, before retiring from professional hockey in 2009.

== Personal life ==
Gratton lives in Ancaster, Ontario, and has one son, Zachary, who plays hockey, and three daughters. He has coached his son in minor hockey, first in house league in Ancaster, then for AA and eventually with the Hamilton AAA Jr. Bulldogs' bantam team.

Gratton is co-owner of the Florida Jr. Blades Organization (in the 29-team Empire Junior Hockey League).

Gratton is the head coach of the Welland Jr. Canadians Greater Ontario Junior Hockey League

== Career statistics ==
=== Regular season and playoffs ===
			Regular season					Playoffs
Season	Team	League	GP	G	A	Pts	PIM	GP	G	A	Pts	PIM
1989–90	Brantford Classics	MWJHL	1	0	2	2	2	—	—	—	—	—
1990–91	Brantford Classics	MWJHL	31	30	30	60	28	—	—	—	—	—
1991–92	Kingston Frontenacs	OHL	62	27	39	66	37	—	—	—	—	—
1992–93	Kingston Frontenacs	OHL	58	55	54	109	125	16	11	18	29	42
1993–94	Tampa Bay Lightning	NHL	84	13	29	42	123	—	—	—	—	—
1994–95	Tampa Bay Lightning	NHL	46	7	20	27	89	—	—	—	—	—
1995–96	Tampa Bay Lightning	NHL	82	17	21	38	105	6	0	2	2	27
1996–97	Tampa Bay Lightning	NHL	82	30	32	62	201	—	—	—	—	—
1997–98	Philadelphia Flyers	NHL	82	22	40	62	159	5	2	0	2	10
1998–99	Philadelphia Flyers	NHL	26	1	7	8	41	—	—	—	—	—
1998–99	Tampa Bay Lightning	NHL	52	7	19	26	102	—	—	—	—	—
1999–2000	Tampa Bay Lightning	NHL	58	14	27	41	121	—	—	—	—	—
1999–2000	Buffalo Sabres	NHL	14	1	7	8	15	5	0	1	1	4
2000–01	Buffalo Sabres	NHL	82	19	21	40	102	13	6	4	10	14
2001–02	Buffalo Sabres	NHL	82	15	24	39	75	—	—	—	—	—
2002–03	Buffalo Sabres	NHL	66	15	29	44	86	—	—	—	—	—
2002–03	Phoenix Coyotes	NHL	14	0	1	1	21	—	—	—	—	—
2003–04	Phoenix Coyotes	NHL	68	11	18	29	93	—	—	—	—	—
2003–04	Colorado Avalanche	NHL	13	2	1	3	18	11	0	0	0	27
2005–06	Florida Panthers	NHL	76	17	22	39	104	—	—	—	—	—
2006–07	Florida Panthers	NHL	81	13	22	35	94	—	—	—	—	—
2007–08	Tampa Bay Lightning	NHL	60	10	11	21	77	—	—	—	—	—
2008–09	Tampa Bay Lightning	NHL	18	0	2	2	10	—	—	—	—	—
2008–09	Norfolk Admirals	AHL	24	3	12	15	8	—	—	—	—	—
2008–09	Columbus Blue Jackets	NHL	6	0	1	1	2	—	—	—	—	—
NHL totals			1,092	214	354	568	1,638	40	8	7	15	82

=== International ===
Year	Team	Event	GP	G	A	Pts	PIM
1993	Canada	WJC	7	2	2	4	6
1997	Canada	WC	11	0	5	5	14
1998	Canada	WC	4	1	0	1	4
Senior totals			15	1	5	6	18

== See also ==
- List of NHL players who have signed offer sheets
- List of NHL players with 1,000 games played

Awards and achievements
Preceded by Roman Hamrlik	Tampa Bay Lightning first-round draft pick 1993	Succeeded by Jason Wiemer
Sporting positions
Preceded by Bill Houlder	Tampa Bay Lightning captain 1999–2000	Succeeded by Vincent Lecavalier
