= You're All I Need (disambiguation) =

You're All I Need is a 1968 album by Marvin Gaye and Tammi Terrell.

"You're All I Need" may also refer to:

== Songs ==
- "You're All I Need" (song) by Mötley Crüe
- "You're All I Need", a song by Billy Eckstine from the 1994 album Everything I Have Is Yours
- "You're All I Need", a song by Bobby Bland, 1967
- "You're All I Need", a song by Carmel, 1992
- "You're All I Need", a song by En Vogue from the 1997 album EV3
- "You're All I Need", a song by Peter Kent, 1980
- "You're All I Need", a song by White Lion from Mane Attraction, 1991

== See also ==
- "You're All I Need to Get By" by Marvin Gaye and Tammi Terrell
- All I Need (disambiguation)
