= Everything I Have Is Yours =

Everything I Have Is Yours can refer to:

- "Everything I Have Is Yours" (song), a 1933 popular song by Burton Lane and Harold Adamson
- Everything I Have Is Yours (album), a compilation of songs recorded by Billy Eckstine, released in 1994
- Everything I Have Is Yours (film), a 1952 musical film directed by Robert Z. Leonard
