= Cable News Hong Kong =

Cable News is responsible for the newsgathering operation of Cable Television in Hong Kong. It is run by i-CABLE News Limited. One of its many channels is the i-CABLE News Channel.

Cable News Hong Kong incorporates 3 channels.

- i-CABLE Finance Info Channel
- i-CABLE News Channel
- i-CABLE Live News Channel

== Anchors ==
- Lizzie Chan (Chief Anchors)
- Cheryl Yuen
- Iris Leung
- Ceci Ho
- Lucas Wan
- Natalie Cheng
- Chan Tsz Ching
- Ken Lau

former well-known anchors:

- Kendrew Wong
- Oscar Lee
- Vincent Choi
- Keith Lau
- Vincent Lui
- Lavender Cheung
- Joanne Yung
- Anny Chong
- Taly Yau
- Carman Tsang
- Lap Yeung
- Max Choi
- Kimmy Ng
- Kenix Wong
- Circle Lo
- Hedy Wong
- Icy Cheung
- Trista Cheng
- Jasmine Law
- Venus Wong
- Petrina Wong
- Tommy Lee
- Jeffrey Siu
- Tracy Kwan
- Venus Cheung
- Kenix Lau
- Candace Ho
- Christy Chan
- Christina Chan
- Kammily Cheung
- Kary Chen
- Karkar Chin
- Vicky Wong
- Cherry Chan
- Sinyi Lam
- Mavis Wong
- Joshua Kwok
- Agnes Kwok
- Gordon Choi
- Ronald Tang
- Carson Leung
- Yanna Yu
- Terrie Leung
- Erica Lam
- Johnny Tsui
- Gigi Tang
- Krystal Law
- Jenny Mak
- Koris Leung
- Kelly Tse
- Victor Chung
- Jolly Wong
- Vincent Chan
- Michael Lee

== Slogan ==
At the Forefront of Facts (Chinese: 走在事實最前線)
