= Michael Lee =

Michael or Mike Lee may refer to:

== Performing arts ==
- Michael Lee (musician) (1969–2008), English rock drummer
- Michael K. Lee (born 1973), American theater actor
- Mike Lee (musician) (born 1988), American Christian musician, worship pastor, and guitarist

== Politics ==
- Mike Lee (born 1971), American politician serving as U.S. senator from Utah since 2011
- Michael Lee (Australian politician) (born 1957), Australian Labor politician
- Michael Lee (Canadian politician), BC Liberal Party MLA
- Michael V. Lee (born 1968), North Carolina state senator
- Mike Lee (New Zealand politician), Auckland councilor
- Mike Lee (Hawaii politician), member of the Hawaii House of Representatives

== Sports ==
- Michael Lee (basketball, born 1983), American basketball player and assistant coach
- Michael Lee (basketball, born 1986), American basketball player
- Michael Lee (field hockey) (born 1980), Canadian field hockey player
- Michael Lee (speedway rider) (born 1958), speedway world champion
- Michael Lee (Zimbabwean cricketer) (1935–2012), Zimbabwean cricketer
- Mike Lee (American football) (born 1991), American football cornerback
- Mike Lee (baseball) (born 1941), former baseball player
- Mike Lee (boxer) (born 1987), American boxer
- Mike Lee (bull rider) (born 1983), American bull rider
- Mike Lee (ice hockey, born 1990), American ice hockey goaltender
- Mike Lee (ice hockey, born 1996), American ice hockey defenseman
- Mike Lee (tennis) (born 1963), American tennis player
- Mikey Lee (born 1993), Irish hurler
- Arthur Lee (cricketer, born 1913) (Arthur Michael Lee, 1913–1983), English cricketer and lawyer, known as Michael Lee in his legal career

== Other uses ==
- Michael Lee (judge) (born 1965), Australian judge
- Michael Lee (The Wire), fictitious character on The Wire, played by Tristan Wilds
- Mike Lee Stakes, a New York state horse race

== See also ==
- Michael Leigh (disambiguation)
