= I-CABLE News Channel (Hong Kong) =

Hong Kong television channel

i-CABLE News Channel
- Country: Hong Kong
- Broadcast area: Hong Kong
- Headquarters: Tsuen Wan, Hong Kong

Programming
- Picture format: 1080i HDTV

Ownership
- Owner: i-CABLE News Limited i-CABLE Communications Limited

History
- Launched: 31 October 1993
- Closed: 1 June 2023 (29 years, 7 months and 1 day)

Links
- Website: http://cablenews.i-cable.com

Availability

Streaming media
- i-CABLE News App: App

i-CABLE News Channel (Chinese: 有線新聞台) was a Cantonese cable news channel in Hong Kong. It is the first 24-hour television news service in Hong Kong and Asia.

The channel forms part of Cable News Hong Kong and is owned by i-CABLE News Limited, and is seen on Channel 9 (Until 23 May 2018 in SD and Channel 209 Until 7 May 2018 in HD) on Cable TV Hong Kong's channel lineup. News bulletins are presented throughout the day, including financial, weather, sport and breaking news, updated every thirty minutes.

On 8 and 24 May 2018, i-Cable News Channel was renumbered to Channel 109 in HD and Channel 152 in SD.

== History ==
The original Cable News Channel debuted on 31 October 1993, as part of Cable TV's launch lineup. The channel was split into two services in 1995: Cable News Channel 1 (有線新聞1台) offered in-depth news analysis and business programming along with several news bulletins at various times of the day, while Cable News Channel 2 (有線新聞2台) provided headline news service 24 hours a day.

On 3 January 2006, Cable News re-organised its outputs: Cable News 1 was rebranded as Cable Finance Info Channel (有線財經資訊台), with a focus on business news; Cable News 2 was rebranded as the new Cable News Channel (有線新聞台).

On 1 December 2020, the broadcaster dismissed 40 staff members with immediate effect, citing the economic impact of the COVID-19 pandemic. Several other staff members resigned in protest.

On 1 June 2023, the channel and Finance Info Channel were closed as Cable TV discontinued its pay television operations. Both channels' programmes continue to broadcast on the free-to-air Hoy Infotainment Channel on channel 78.

== Newscasts ==
Current news sections are named as follows.

- CABLE News (Weekdays: 00:00-07:00, 09:00-18:00, and 23:00-00:00; Weekends: 00:00-18:00 and 23:00-00:00)
- CABLE Morning News (Cable早晨) (Mondays to Fridays: 07:00-09:00)
- 1230 News (午間新聞) (12:30-13:00)
- Sign-Language News (手語新聞報道) (18:00-18:30)
- 1830 News (六點半新聞報導) (Weekdays: 18:30-18:45, Weekends: 18:30-19:00)
- 1900 News (7點直播室) (Weekdays: 19:00-20:00; Weekends & Public Holidays: 19:00-19:30)
- International News (國際最前線) (20:00-20:30)
- 2100 News (晚間直播室) (Weekdays: 21:00-21:45; Weekends: 21:00-21:30)

Originally, news sections are named according to the time of day at which they are screened.

- Morning Edition (Weekdays 09:00-12:00, Weekends 07:00-12:00)
- Noon Edition (12:00-14:00)
- Afternoon Edition (14:00-18:00)
- Prime Edition (Weekdays 21:00-21:30, Weekends 21:00-22:00)
- 2400 News (午夜最前線) (Weeknights: 00:00-00:30; Weekends: 00:00-01:00)
- Late Night Edition (深夜直播室) (01:00-04:00)
- 1800 News (六點新聞報導) (18:00-18:30)
- 2300 News (晚間最前線) (23:30-00:00)
- 2330 News (十一點半最前線) (23:30-00:00)

The main cast are at 19:00 (with two anchors, jointly with Hong Kong Open TV), 19:30 (with two anchors, only on Weekends), and at mid-night(00:00 with an anchor, jointly with i-Cable Family Entertainment Channel) every day. From 3 February 2020, weekdays 1900 News extend to 1 hour during the coronavirus epidemic (with two anchors, jointly with Hong Kong Open TV), 1930 News which have the same Chinese name is cancelled during weekdays.

Programs that are broadcast jointly with i-Cable Family Entertainment Channel including:

News Section	Time	Day
CABLE Morning News	08:00-09:00	Weekdays
CABLE News	08:00-09:00	Weekends
1800 News	18:00-18:15	Weekdays
CABLE News	18:15-19:00	Weekdays
China Beat	21:30-22:00	Weekdays
2400 News	00:00-00:30	Daily
CABLE News	05:30-06:00	Daily

== Anchors ==
Anchors are responsible for the casts on the channel, reporting live news daily. Some of them are the host of programmes of i-CABLE Finance Info Channel.

There has been several changes from 2020-2022

- Jolly Wong (Chief Anchor)
- Vincent Chan (Principal Anchor)
- Cheryl Yuen (Principal Anchor)
- Cherry Chan (Senior Anchor)
- Terrie Leung (Senior Anchor)
- Yanna Yu (Senior Anchor)
- Karkar Chin (Part-Time Anchor)
- Carson Leung (Anchor)
- Krystal Law (Anchor)
- Erica Lam (Anchor)

Some Reporters may also host news occasionally.

Former anchors:

- Lavender Cheung
- Joanne Yung
- Icy Cheung
- Anny Chong
- Venus Wong
- Petrina Wong
- Circle Lo
- Hedy Wong
- Jasmine Law
- Tiffany Mak
- Trista Cheng
- Eugenea Cheung
- Lizzie Chan
- Taly Yau (currently editor)
- Carman Tsang
- Kimmy Ng
- Kenix Wong
- Tracy Kwan (currently editor)
- Mei Wong
- Venus Cheung
- Kenix Lau
- Candace Ho
- Kammily Cheung
- Vicky Wong
- Mavis Wong
- Joshua Kwok
- Agnes Kwok
- Gordon Choi
- Elmo Wong
- Suey Liu
- Sinyi Lam
- Yoyo Li
