= List of Perth Thunder players =

The Perth Thunder are an ice hockey team based in Perth, Western Australia, Australia and are members of the Australian Ice Hockey League (AIHL). Founded in 2010 the Thunder joined the AIHL in 2012 and have made the Goodall Cup playoffs on six occasions with their best result in 2019 where they finished as runners-up. Since their inception, 85 players have played at least one regular season or playoff game for the Thunder. The team's current captain is Jamie Woodman who took over the position in 2017 from Sam Wilson. Canadian Benjamin Breault, who has been playing for the club since 2016, leads the team in scoring with 197 points in 115 games.

== Legend ==
| GP | Games played | W | Wins | L | Losses |
| Pos | Position | F | Forward | D | Defenceman |
| GK | Goaltender | G | Goals | A | Assists |
| Pts | Points | PIM | Penalties in minutes | Min | Minutes played |
| GAA | Goals against average | SO | Shutouts | SV% | Save percentage |

Statistics complete as of the end of the 2019 AIHL season.

== Goaltenders ==
| Name | Nationality | Seasons | GP | W | L | MIN | SO | GAA | SV% | GP | W | L | MIN | SO | GAA | SV% | Notes |
| Name | Nationality | Seasons | Regular season | | | | | | | Playoffs | | | | | | | Notes |
|---|---|---|---|---|---|---|---|---|---|---|---|---|---|---|---|---|---|
| Evan Bowater | Australia | 2019 | 1 | 0 | 0 | 7 | 0 | 7.14 | 0.889 | — | — | — | — | — | — | — | |
| Dan Clarke | Canada | 2013 | 13 | 9 | 4 | 646 | 1 | 3.17 | 0.906 | 1 | 0 | 1 | 50 | 0 | 6.00 | 0.818 | |
| Peter Di Salvo | Canada | 2015, 2017–2018 | 62 | 41 | 21 | 3078 | 5 | 2.83 | 0.918 | 2 | 0 | 2 | 98 | 0 | 4.08 | 0.879 | |
| Mathieu Dugas | Canada | 2014 | 28 | 11 | 17 | 1396 | 1 | 3.29 | 0.916 | — | — | — | — | — | — | — | |
| Lew Fellows | Australia | 2013 | 1 | 1 | 0 | 3 | 0 | 0.00 | 1.000 | — | — | — | — | — | — | — | |
| Mark Guggenberger | United States | 2015 | 17 | 9 | 6 | 747 | 0 | 3.08 | 0.907 | 1 | 0 | 1 | 50 | 0 | 1.00 | 0.970 | |
| Thomas Heemskerk | Canada | 2016 | 27 | 20 | 7 | 1347 | 2 | 2.45 | 0.927 | 1 | 0 | 1 | 60 | 0 | 2.50 | 0.933 | |
| Mark McCann | Australia | 2015–2017 | 9 | 0 | 4 | 288 | 0 | 3.82 | 0.876 | — | — | — | — | — | — | — | |
| Ayden Millward | Australia | 2012–2013 | 2 | 0 | 2 | 31 | 0 | 14.52 | 0.591 | — | — | — | — | — | — | — | |
| Michael Smart | Australia | 2013 | 15 | 9 | 6 | 726 | 0 | 4.68 | 0.851 | — | — | — | — | — | — | — | |
| Kiefer Smiley | Canada | 2012 | 23 | 10 | 13 | 1026 | 0 | 3.41 | 0.893 | — | — | — | — | — | — | — | |
| Nico Vikstén | Finland | 2019 | 28 | 17 | 11 | 1397 | 2 | 3.61 | 0.894 | 2 | 1 | 1 | 100 | 0 | 3.50 | 0.881 | |
| Daniel Wilkinson | Australia | 2015 | 4 | 0 | 4 | 129 | 0 | 6.59 | 0.793 | — | — | — | — | — | — | — | |
| Nicholas Windle | Australia | 2019 | 1 | 0 | 0 | 3 | 0 | 0.00 | 1.000 | — | — | — | — | — | — | — | |

== Skaters ==
| Name | Nationality | Pos | Seasons | GP | G | A | Pts | PIM | GP | G | A | Pts | PIM | Notes |
| Name | Nationality | Pos | Seasons | Regular season | | | | | Playoffs | | | | | Notes |
|---|---|---|---|---|---|---|---|---|---|---|---|---|---|---|
| Sam Bavin | Australia | D | 2012 | 5 | 0 | 0 | 0 | 2 | — | — | — | — | — | |
| Brian Berger | United States | F | 2013 | 13 | 16 | 6 | 22 | 4 | — | — | — | — | — | |
| Jessyko Bernard | Canada | F | 2016–2017 | 52 | 38 | 48 | 86 | 95 | 2 | 1 | 2 | 3 | 0 | |
| Robert Bird | Australia | D | 2012, 2017–2018 | 39 | 0 | 6 | 6 | 22 | — | — | — | — | — | |
| Benjamin Breault | Canada | F | 2016–2019 | 110 | 82 | 111 | 193 | 95 | 5 | 3 | 1 | 4 | 4 | 2017 AIHL leading scorer |
| Jonathon Bremner | Australia | F | 2012–2018 | 162 | 38 | 45 | 83 | 182 | 5 | 0 | 0 | 0 | 0 | |
| Jamie Campbell | Australia | D | 2015–2017 | 27 | 0 | 2 | 2 | 14 | — | — | — | — | — | |
| Fred Coutts | Australia | D | 2013 | 13 | 0 | 0 | 0 | 16 | — | — | — | — | — | |
| Andrew Cox | New Zealand | F | 2012–2019 | 200 | 68 | 84 | 152 | 200 | 7 | 1 | 0 | 1 | 12 | |
| Zane Cunliffe | Australia | F | 2016 | 7 | 0 | 0 | 0 | 0 | — | — | — | — | — | |
| Luc Daigneault | Canada | F | 2015 | 27 | 19 | 5 | 24 | 67 | 1 | 0 | 0 | 0 | 0 | |
| Kevin Darcy | Australia | D | 2013 | 18 | 4 | 3 | 7 | 42 | 1 | 0 | 0 | 0 | 0 | |
| Riccardo Del Basso | Australia | D | 2012–2015 | 93 | 3 | 21 | 24 | 95 | 2 | 0 | 0 | 0 | 0 | |
| Michael Door | United States | F | 2016 | 28 | 20 | 31 | 51 | 16 | 1 | 0 | 2 | 2 | 0 | |
| Michael Forney | United States | F | 2013 | 16 | 11 | 36 | 47 | 12 | — | — | — | — | — | |
| Justin Fox | Canada | F | 2014 | 21 | 20 | 20 | 40 | 49 | — | — | — | — | — | |
| Pascal Gemperli | Switzerland | F | 2018 | 8 | 2 | 1 | 3 | 0 | — | — | — | — | — | |
| Jake Gilmour | Canada | F | 2019 | 5 | 4 | 5 | 9 | 12 | — | — | — | — | — | |
| Phil Ginand | United States | F | 2012 | 23 | 26 | 24 | 50 | 100 | — | — | — | — | — | |
| Per Daniel Göransson | Australia | D | 2016–2017 | 45 | 11 | 22 | 33 | 159 | 2 | 0 | 1 | 1 | 0 | |
| Kaden Goulds | Australia | F | 2014–2015, 2018 | 10 | 0 | 2 | 2 | 0 | — | — | — | — | — | |
| Paul Graham | Australia | F | 2012 | 16 | 0 | 4 | 4 | 0 | — | — | — | — | — | |
| Pier-Olivier Grandmaison | Canada | F | 2018 | 28 | 28 | 39 | 67 | 26 | 1 | 0 | 0 | 0 | 2 | 2018 AIHL Most Valuable Player; 2018 AIHL leading scorer |
| Jordan Grover | Australia | D | 2014 | 12 | 0 | 3 | 3 | 2 | — | — | — | — | — | |
| Sean Hamilton | Australia | F | 2013, 2016, 2019 | 47 | 5 | 4 | 9 | 58 | 2 | 0 | 0 | 0 | 0 | |
| Dale Harrop | New Zealand | F | 2016 | 14 | 0 | 0 | 0 | 0 | 1 | 0 | 0 | 0 | 0 | |
| Robert Haselhurst | Australia | F | 2013–2017, 2019 | 145 | 34 | 78 | 112 | 223 | 5 | 0 | 1 | 1 | 14 | 2017 AIHL Defenceman of the Year |
| Colby Hauser | Canada | F | 2012–2014 | 21 | 1 | 1 | 2 | 14 | — | — | — | — | — | |
| Josh Healey | Australia | F | 2018 | 9 | 0 | 0 | 0 | 2 | — | — | — | — | — | |
| Aaron Hoffman | Canada | D | 2013 | 6 | 0 | 1 | 1 | 10 | — | — | — | — | — | |
| Alex Hudson | United States | F | 2015 | 14 | 10 | 10 | 20 | 24 | 1 | 0 | 0 | 0 | 0 | |
| Stephen Huish | New Zealand | F | 2013 | 2 | 0 | 0 | 0 | 0 | — | — | — | — | — | |
| Greg Hyde | Australia | F | 2012, 2014–2015 | 55 | 4 | 17 | 21 | 161 | 1 | 0 | 0 | 0 | 0 | |
| Liam Jeffries | Australia | F | 2012–2019 | 84 | 6 | 22 | 28 | 34 | 4 | 0 | 0 | 0 | 0 | |
| Luke Judson | Canada | F | 2015 | 9 | 5 | 8 | 13 | 16 | — | — | — | — | — | |
| Toni Kluuskeri | Finland | F | 2015 | 26 | 16 | 21 | 37 | 26 | 1 | 0 | 0 | 0 | 0 | |
| David Kudla | Australia | D | 2012–2019 | 193 | 10 | 55 | 65 | 94 | 7 | 0 | 2 | 2 | 4 | |
| Simon Kudla | Australia | F | 2012–2014, 2017–2018 | 74 | 7 | 11 | 18 | 139 | 2 | 0 | 0 | 0 | 6 | |
| Jordan Kyros | Australia | F | 2012–2019 | 206 | 49 | 98 | 147 | 94 | 7 | 0 | 1 | 1 | 0 | |
| Richie Lamb | Australia | D | 2012–2013 | 34 | 0 | 1 | 1 | 38 | — | — | — | — | — | |
| Mitchell Levitt | Australia | D | 2015 | 1 | 0 | 0 | 0 | 0 | — | — | — | — | — | |
| Lyndon Lodge | Australia | F | 2015–2019 | 84 | 5 | 11 | 16 | 36 | 3 | 0 | 0 | 0 | 0 | |
| Yannic Lodge | Australia | F | 2019 | 6 | 0 | 0 | 0 | 0 | — | — | — | — | — | |
| David Mahood | Australia | D | 2016 | 2 | 0 | 0 | 0 | 0 | — | — | — | — | — | |
| Louick Marcotte | Canada | F | 2019 | 25 | 22 | 40 | 62 | 91 | 2 | 1 | 2 | 3 | 0 | |
| Jaymie McDonnell | Australia | F | 2017–2019 | 6 | 0 | 0 | 0 | 0 | — | — | — | — | — | |
| Jason McMahon | New Zealand | F | 2018–2019 | 49 | 5 | 10 | 15 | 22 | 3 | 0 | 0 | 0 | 0 | 2018 AIHL Rookie of the Year |
| Dan Mohle | Canada | F | 2013 | 12 | 5 | 17 | 22 | 20 | 1 | 0 | 0 | 0 | 14 | |
| Aku Nevalainen | Finland | F | 2014 | 6 | 0 | 3 | 3 | 18 | — | — | — | — | — | |
| Anthony Nottle | Australia | D | 2012–2016 | 62 | 2 | 7 | 9 | 32 | — | — | — | — | — | |
| Landon Oslanski | Canada | D | 2018 | 19 | 12 | 34 | 46 | 90 | — | — | — | — | — | 2018 AIHL Defenceman of the Year |
| Christian Ouellet | Canada | F | 2017 | 23 | 14 | 34 | 48 | 14 | 1 | 1 | 0 | 1 | 0 | |
| Alastair Punler | Australia | D | 2015–2019 | 109 | 5 | 16 | 21 | 149 | 5 | 0 | 0 | 0 | 0 | |
| Kim Ranto-Aho | Finland | F | 2014 | 4 | 1 | 2 | 3 | 0 | — | — | — | — | — | |
| Chris Roach | Australia | F | 2012–2013 | 2 | 0 | 0 | 0 | 0 | — | — | — | — | — | |
| Ken Rolph | Canada | F | 2012–2013 | 51 | 41 | 52 | 93 | 52 | 1 | 0 | 0 | 0 | 0 | |
| David Ruck | Australia | F | 2012–2015 | 80 | 15 | 20 | 35 | 22 | 1 | 0 | 0 | 0 | 0 | |
| Jakob Ruck | Australia | F | 2017–2019 | 53 | 2 | 3 | 5 | 10 | 3 | 0 | 0 | 0 | 0 | |
| Tomek Sak | Australia | F | 2015–2019 | 127 | 16 | 14 | 30 | 58 | 5 | 0 | 0 | 0 | 0 | |
| Stuart Stefan | Canada | F | 2014 | 28 | 14 | 30 | 44 | 40 | — | — | — | — | — | |
| Matt Strueby | Canada | F | 2013 | 8 | 9 | 12 | 21 | 20 | — | — | — | — | — | |
| Shaun Tobin | Australia | F | 2014, 2017, 2019 | 43 | 6 | 15 | 21 | 6 | 3 | 1 | 0 | 1 | 0 | |
| Joe Tolles | United States | D | 2013 | 8 | 9 | 10 | 19 | 30 | — | — | — | — | — | |
| Corey Toy | United States | D | 2014 | 21 | 10 | 13 | 23 | 68 | — | — | — | — | — | |
| Keven Veilleux | Canada | F | 2019 | 25 | 22 | 30 | 52 | 112 | 2 | 0 | 1 | 1 | 0 | |
| Cameron Walsh | Australia | F | 2013, 2017 | 24 | 3 | 3 | 6 | 26 | 1 | 0 | 0 | 0 | 0 | |
| Kieren Webster | Australia | F | 2014–2019 | 135 | 29 | 39 | 68 | 14 | 5 | 1 | 1 | 2 | 0 | 2015 AIHL Rookie of the Year; 2019 Local Player of the Year |
| Aaron Wilson | Canada | D | 2012 | 24 | 3 | 20 | 23 | 40 | — | — | — | — | — | |
| Sam Wilson | Australia | F | 2012–2017 | 139 | 21 | 51 | 72 | 131 | 3 | 1 | 0 | 1 | 2 | Captain, 2012–2016 |
| Jamie Woodman | Australia | D | 2014–2019 | 150 | 12 | 42 | 54 | 68 | 6 | 0 | 1 | 1 | 4 | Captain, 2017–2019 |
| Bradley Young | Australia | F | 2012–2015 | 92 | 3 | 23 | 26 | 303 | 2 | 0 | 0 | 0 | 0 | |
