= 2008–09 USHL season =

2008-09 USHL season
- League: United States Hockey League
- Sport: Ice hockey
- Duration: October 3, 2008 – May 8, 2009
- Games: 60
- Teams: 12

Draft
- Top draft pick: Michael Forney
- Picked by: Green Bay Gamblers

Regular season
- Anderson Cup: Green Bay Gamblers
- Season MVP: Andrew Miller (Chicago Steel)
- Top scorer: Andrew Miller (Chicago Steel)

Clark Cup Playoffs
- Clark Cup Playoffs MVP: Michael Cichy (Ice)
- Finals champions: Indiana Ice
- Runners-up: Fargo Force

USHL seasons
- 2007–08 2009–10

The 2008–09 USHL season is the 30th season of the United States Hockey League as an all-junior league. The regular season began on October 3, 2008, and concluded on April 5, 2009, with the regular season champion winning the Anderson Cup. The 2008–09 season was the first for the expansion Fargo Force, replacing the Ohio Junior Blue Jackets who folded after only two seasons in existence.

The Clark Cup playoffs featured the top four teams from each division competing for the league title.

== Regular season ==
Final Standings

Note: GP = Games played; W = Wins; L = Losses; OTL = Overtime losses; SL = Shootout losses; GF = Goals for; GA = Goals against; PTS = Points; x = clinched playoff berth; y = clinched division title; z = clinched league title

=== East Division ===
| Team | GP | W | L | OTL | PTS | GF | GA |
|---|---|---|---|---|---|---|---|
| zGreen Bay Gamblers | 60 | 39 | 17 | 4 | 82 | 237 | 165 |
| xCedar Rapids RoughRiders | 60 | 38 | 17 | 5 | 81 | 219 | 147 |
| xIndiana Ice | 60 | 39 | 19 | 2 | 80 | 221 | 177 |
| xWaterloo Black Hawks | 60 | 37 | 20 | 3 | 77 | 246 | 198 |
| Chicago Steel | 60 | 31 | 27 | 2 | 64 | 194 | 213 |
| Des Moines Buccaneers | 60 | 12 | 43 | 5 | 29 | 167 | 283 |

=== West Division ===
| Team | GP | W | L | OTL | PTS | GF | GA |
|---|---|---|---|---|---|---|---|
| yLincoln Stars | 60 | 37 | 17 | 6 | 80 | 191 | 155 |
| xOmaha Lancers | 60 | 32 | 21 | 7 | 71 | 218 | 192 |
| xFargo Force | 60 | 32 | 23 | 5 | 69 | 191 | 166 |
| xSioux Falls Stampede | 60 | 28 | 28 | 4 | 60 | 182 | 199 |
| Sioux City Musketeers | 60 | 24 | 30 | 6 | 54 | 194 | 210 |
| Tri-City Storm | 60 | 11 | 48 | 1 | 23 | 140 | 295 |

== Players ==
=== Scoring leaders ===
Note: GP = Games played; G = Goals; A = Assists; Pts = Points; PIM = Penalty minutes

| Player | Team | GP | G | A | Pts | PIM |
|---|---|---|---|---|---|---|
| Andrew Miller | Chicago Steel | 58 | 32 | 50 | 82 | 76 |
| Michael Cichy | Tri-City/Indiana | 56 | 34 | 42 | 76 | 23 |
| Craig Smith | Waterloo Black Hawks | 54 | 28 | 48 | 76 | 108 |
| Mike Seidel | Cedar Rapids RoughRiders | 59 | 29 | 44 | 73 | 36 |
| Stéphane Da Costa | Sioux City Musketeers | 48 | 31 | 36 | 67 | 23 |
| Kirt Hill | Lincoln Stars | 56 | 24 | 42 | 66 | 112 |
| Stanislav Galiev | Indiana Ice | 60 | 29 | 35 | 64 | 46 |
| Brandon Richardson | Indiana Ice | 55 | 21 | 42 | 63 | 145 |
| Michael Forney | Green Bay Gamblers | 59 | 26 | 34 | 60 | 53 |
| Andy Taranto | Fargo Force | 60 | 34 | 25 | 59 | 40 |
| Louis Leblanc | Omaha Lancers | 60 | 28 | 31 | 59 | 78 |

=== Leading goaltenders ===
Note: GP = Games played; Mins = Minutes played; W = Wins; L = Losses: OTL = Overtime losses; GA = Goals Allowed; SO = Shutouts; SV% = Save percentage; GAA = Goals against average

| Player | Team | GP | Mins | W | L | OTL | GA | SO | SV% | GAA |
|---|---|---|---|---|---|---|---|---|---|---|
| Kevin Murdock | Lincoln Stars | 35 | 2005 | 21 | 10 | 4 | 75 | 1 | 0.920 | 2.24 |
| Troy Grosenick | Cedar Rapids RoughRiders | 24 | 1363 | 13 | 5 | 4 | 53 | 1 | 0.910 | 2.33 |
| Steve Summerhays | Green Bay Gamblers | 23 | 1328 | 15 | 6 | 1 | 52 | 1 | 0.909 | 2.35 |
| Mike Johnson | Cedar Rapids RoughRiders | 39 | 2264 | 23 | 12 | 0 | 90 | 3 | 0.909 | 2.39 |
| Mike Lee | Fargo Force | 48 | 2745 | 26 | 15 | 0 | 110 | 3 | 0.918 | 2.40 |

== Clark Cup Playoffs ==
Quarter-finals
1 | Green Bay | 4 | 4 | 8 | – | –
4 | Waterloo | 1 | 3 | 2 | – | –
East Division
2 | Cedar Rapids | 2 | 3 | 4 | 1 | 6
3 | Indiana | 7 | 2 | 3 | 5 | 7
1 | Lincoln | 6 | 1 | 4 | 6 | –
4 | Sioux Falls | 1 | 4 | 3 | 1 | –
West Division
2 | Omaha | 2 | 2 | 3 | – | –
3 | Fargo | 6 | 4 | 4 | – | –

Semi-finals
1 | Green Bay | 1 | 4 | 2 | 3 | –
3 | Indiana | 5 | 3 | 4 | 5 | –
1 | Lincoln | 1 | 3 | 0 | – | –
3 | Fargo | 4 | 7 | 2 | – | –

Clark Cup Championship
E | Indiana | 1 | 5 | 6 | 5 | –
W | Fargo | 2 | 2 | 0 | 1 | –

== Quarterfinals ==
=== Eastern Division ===
==== (E1) Green Bay Gamblers vs. (E4) Waterloo Black Hawks ====
| April 9 | Green Bay Gamblers | 4 – 1 | Waterloo Black Hawks | Resch Center |
| No scoring | | First period | Jordan Samuels-Thomas (1) - 2:54 |
| 2:54 - Anthony Hayes (1); 8:53 - Ryan Furne (1); 13:40 - Robert Shea (1) | | Second period | No scoring |
| 18:24 - en - William Rapuzzi (1) | | Third period | No scoring |
| Reid Ellingson (29 saves / 30 shots) | | Goalie stats | Joe Howe (23 saves / 26 shots) |

| April 11 | Green Bay Gamblers | 4 – 3 | OT | Waterloo Black Hawks | Resch Center |
| 7:33 - pp - Michael Forney (1) | | First period | | J. T. Brown (1) - 2:37 |
| No scoring | | Second period | | Craig Smith (1) - 12:55 |
| 10:00 - pp - Chris Saracino (1); 19:39 - Michael Forney (2) | | Third period | | Jordan Samuels-Thomas (2) - 3:13 |
| 7:48 - pp - Ryan Furne (2) | | First overtime period | | No scoring |
| Steve Summerhays (22 saves / 25 shots) | | Goalie stats | | Parker Milner (31 saves / 35 shots) |

| April 15 | Waterloo Black Hawks | 2 – 8 | Green Bay Gamblers | Young Arena |
| 7:20 - pp - Eriah Hayes (1); Keegan Meuer (1) - 12:29 | | First period | Chris Crane (1) - 2:21; Reed Seckel (1) - pp - 17:08; Anthony Hayes (2) - sh - 19:47 |
| No scoring | | Second period | Reed Seckel (2) - 2:15 |
| No scoring | | Third period | David Makowski (1) - pp - 4:44; Chris Crane (2) - sh - en - 19:03; David Makowski (2) - en - 19:33 |
| Joe Howe (6 saves / 9 shots); Parker Milner (12 saves / 15 shots) | | Goalie stats | Reid Ellingson (26 saves / 28 shots) |

| Green Bay wins series 3 – 0 |

==== (E2) Cedar Rapids RoughRiders vs. (E3) Indiana Ice ====
| April 10 | Cedar Rapids RoughRiders | 2 – 7 | Indiana Ice | Cedar Rapids Ice Arena |
| No scoring | | First period | Brent Gwidt (1) - sh - 2:53; Zach Golembiewski (1) - sh - 14:50; Brent Gwidt (2) - 19:06; Sebastian Geoffrion (1) - 19:49 |
| 9:17 - pp - Mike Seidel (1) | | Second period | Brandon Richardson (1) - 1:56; Shane Berschbach (1) - 13:29 |
| 8:24 - Ben Lynch (1) | | Third period | Ben Albertson (1) - sh - en - 13:40 |
| Mike Johnson (9 saves / 13 shots); Troy Grosenick (7 saves / 9 shots) | | Goalie stats | Brett Bennett (37 saves / 39 shots) |

| April 11 | Cedar Rapids RoughRiders | 3 – 2 | OT | Indiana Ice | Cedar Rapids Ice Arena |
| 9:31 - pp - Kyle Flanagan (1) | | First period | | Stanislav Galiev (1) - pp - 7:43 |
| 10:14 - Kyle Flanagan (2) | | Second period | | No scoring |
| No scoring | | Third period | | Stanislav Galiev (2) - pp - 13:49 |
| 1:02 - Kyle Flanagan (3) | | First overtime period | | No scoring |
| Mike Johnson (21 saves / 23 shots) | | Goalie stats | | Brett Bennett (34 saves / 37 shots) |

| April 15 | Indiana Ice | 3 – 4 | OT | Cedar Rapids RoughRiders | Pepsi Coliseum |
| 5:37 - Brent Gwidt (3); 16:47 - pp - Michael Cichy (1) | | First period | | No scoring |
| No scoring | | Second period | | Darren Rowe (1) - 4:32; Darren Rowe (2) - 6:16; Tobias Nilsson Roos (1) - 11:36 |
| 17:55 - pp - Brandon Richardson (2) | | Third period | | No scoring |
| No scoring | | First overtime period | | Zach Lehrke (1) - 9:33 |
| Brett Bennett (28 saves / 32 shots) | | Goalie stats | | Mike Johnson (38 saves / 41 shots) |

| April 17 | Indiana Ice | 5 – 1 | Cedar Rapids RoughRiders | Pepsi Coliseum |
| 7:59 - Shane Berschbach (2); 15:51 - Michael Cichy (2) | | First period | No scoring |
| 12:00 - pp - Ben Albertson (2) | | Second period | Kyle Flanagan (4) - sh - 11:51 |
| 10:08 - pp - Zach Golembiewski (2); 17:56 - pp - Stanislav Galiev (3) | | Third period | No scoring |
| Brett Bennett (34 saves / 35 shots) | | Goalie stats | Mike Johnson (18 saves / 23 shots) |

| April 17 | Cedar Rapids RoughRiders | 6 – 7 | Indiana Ice | Cedar Rapids Ice Arena |
| 13:21 - pp - Mike Seidel (2); 15:54 - Kyle Flanagan (5); 18:48 - pp - Tobias Nilsson Roos (2) | | First period | Michael Cichy (3) - pp - 15:28 |
| 18:52 - Tobias Nilsson Roos (2) | | Second period | Brandon Richardson (3) - 12:06; Ben Albertson (3) - 16:34; Brent Gwidt (4) - 18:08 |
| 3:00 - Kyle Flanagan (6); 11:23 - Mike Seidel (3) | | Third period | Brandon Richardson (4) - 1:04; Will MacDonald (1) - 2:04; Torey Krug (1) - 19:45 |
| Mike Johnson (32 saves / 39 shots) | | Goalie stats | Brett Bennett (27 saves / 33 shots) |

| Cedar Rapids wins series 3 – 2 |

=== Western Division ===
==== (W1) Lincoln Stars vs. (W4) Sioux Falls Stampede ====
| April 10 | Lincoln Stars | 6 – 1 | Sioux Falls Stampede | Ice Box |
| 4:46 - Jimmy Siers (1); 7:42 - Jake Newton (1); 14:25 - Garrett Peterson (1); 15:12 - Jake Newton (2) | | First period | Dane Walters (1) - 16:52 |
| 19:11 - Garrett Vermeersch (1) | | Second period | No scoring |
| 6:01 - Garrett Vermeersch (2) | | Third period | No scoring |
| Kevin Murdock (35 saves / 36 shots) | | Goalie stats | Eric Hartzell (13 saves / 17 shots); Clay Witt (26 saves / 28 shots) |

| April 11 | Lincoln Stars | 1 – 4 | Sioux Falls Stampede | Ice Box |
| No scoring | | First period | Luke Greiner (1) - 7:19; Robbie Vrolyk (1) - sh - 19:59 |
| No scoring | | Second period | Dane Walters (2) - sh - 9:55 |
| 4:34 - Garrett Vermeersch (3) | | Third period | Dane Walters (3) - en - 19:13 |
| Kevin Murdock (19 saves / 22 shots) | | Goalie stats | Clay Witt (41 saves / 42 shots) |

| April 14 | Sioux Falls Stampede | 3 – 4 | OT | Lincoln Stars | Sioux Falls Arena |
| No scoring | | First period | | Ross Henry (1) - 6:31 |
| No scoring | | Second period | | Chris Forfar (1) - sh - 14:58 |
| 3:13 - Max Grover (1); 16:57 - pp - Terry Broadhurst (1); 19:39 - Terry Broadhurst (2) | | Third period | | Ryan Kretzer (1) - 4:12 |
| No scoring | | First overtime period | | Eric Alexander (1) - 4:33 |
| Clay Witt (34 saves / 38 shots) | | Goalie stats | | Anthony Borelli (27 saves / 30 shots) |

| April 16 | Sioux Falls Stampede | 1 – 6 | Lincoln Stars | Sioux Falls Arena |
| No scoring | | First period | Garrett Vermeersch (4) - 0:32; Garrett Vermeersch (5) - pp - 12:07 |
| No scoring | | Second period | Garrett Vermeersch (6) - 15:43 |
| 0:27 - pp - Robbie Vrolyk (2) | | Third period | Kirt Hill (1) - 11:42; Kirt Hill (2) - en - 19:26; Corey Chakeen (1) - 19:59 |
| Clay Witt (20 saves / 25 shots) | | Goalie stats | Anthony Borelli (34 saves / 35 shots) |

| Lincoln wins series 3 – 1 |

==== (W2) Omaha Lancers vs. (W3) Fargo Force ====
| April 10 | Omaha Lancers | 2 – 6 | Fargo Force | Omaha Civic Auditorium |
| No scoring | | First period | Andy Taranto (1) - 4:40; Corey Leivermann (1) - 14:45 |
| 6:34 - pp - Danny Kristo (1) | | Second period | Chris Stafne (1) - 12:02; Andy Taranto (2) - sh - 12:52 |
| 6:34 - pp - Jake Hauswirth (1) | | Third period | Colten St. Clair (1) - 2:30; Gavin Hartzog (1) - 3:25 |
| Kris Lazaruk (15 saves / 21 shots); Jeff Teglia (4 saves / 4 shots) | | Goalie stats | Mike Lee (25 saves / 27 shots) |

| April 11 | Omaha Lancers | 2 – 4 | Fargo Force | Omaha Civic Auditorium |
| 10:09 - pp - Danny Kristo (2) | | First period | 16:08 - pp - Andy Taranto (3) |
| 6:43 - sh - Louis Leblanc (1) | | Second period | Johnnie Searfoss (1) - 9:43 |
| No scoring | | Third period | Colten St. Clair (2) - pp - 1:19; Matt Leitner (1) - en - 19:31 |
| Kris Lazaruk (23 saves / 26 shots) | | Goalie stats | Mike Lee (33 saves / 35 shots) |

| April 12 | Fargo Force | 4 – 3 | OT | Omaha Lancers | Scheels Arena |
| 2:57 - sh - Andy Taranto (4); 19:49 - pp - Luke Witkowski (1) | | First period | | Matt White (1) - pp - 12:26 |
| No scoring | | Second period | | Louis Leblanc (2) - 10:20 |
| 9:03 - Chris Stafne (2) | | Third period | | Danny Kristo (3) - pp - 1:54 |
| 4:47 - pp - Andy Taranto (5) | | First overtime period | | No scoring |
| Mike Lee (42 saves / 45 shots) | | Goalie stats | | Kris Lazaruk (35 saves / 39 shots) |

| Fargo wins series 3 – 0 |

== Semifinals ==
=== Eastern Division ===
==== (E1) Green Bay Gamblers vs. (E3) Indiana Ice ====
| April 23 | Green Bay Gamblers | 1 – 5 | Indiana Ice | Resch Center |
| No scoring | | First period | Zach Golembiewski (3) - 2:39; Brandon Richardson (5) - 10:54 |
| No scoring | | Second period | No scoring |
| 18:19 - Anthony Hayes (3) | | Third period | Sebastian Geoffrion (2) - 3:13; Mike Cichy (4) - pp - 14:08; Will MacDonald (2) - en - 16:48 |
| Reid Ellingston (25 saves / 29 shots) | | Goalie stats | Brett Bennett (23 saves / 24 shots) |

| April 25 | Green Bay Gamblers | 4 – 3 | Indiana Ice | Resch Center |
| No scoring | | First period | No scoring |
| 14:19 - Michael Forney (3); 17:17 - Chris Saracino (2) | | Second period | Loren Barron (1) - 5:50 |
| 13:30 - Kevin Albers (1); 19:28 - Chris Saracino (3) | | Third period | Stanislav Galiev (4) - 4:54; John Parker (1) - 6:29 |
| Steve Summerhays (34 saves / 37 shots) | | Goalie stats | Brett Bennett (24 saves / 28 shots) |

| April 27 | Indiana Ice | 4 – 2 | Green Bay Gamblers | Pepsi Coliseum |
| 8:47 - Zach Golembiewski (4) | | First period | C.J. Lee (1) - sh - 15:48; David Makowski (3) - pp - 19:32 |
| No scoring | | Second period | No scoring |
| 15:52 - Max Cook (1); 19:05 - en - Brent Gwidt (5) | | Third period | No scoring |
| Brett Bennett (22 saves / 24 shots) | | Goalie stats | Reid Ellingston (20 saves / 23 shots) |

| April 28 | Indiana Ice | 5 – 3 | Green Bay Gamblers | Pepsi Coliseum |
| No scoring | | First period | Ryan Furne (4) - pp - 12:53; William Rapuzzi (2) - pp - 14:58 |
| 1:15 - Max Cook (2); 7:06 - pp - Ben Albertson (4); 10:16 - pp - Zach Golembiewski (6); 16:02 - Grant Blakey (1) | | Second period | No scoring |
| 19:34 - en - Joe Hartman (1) | | Third period | William Rapuzzi (3) - pp - 6:39 |
| Brett Bennett (21 saves / 24 shots) | | Goalie stats | Steve Summerhays (25 saves / 29 shots) |

| Indiana wins series 3 – 1 |

=== Western Division ===
==== (E1) Lincoln Stars vs. (E3) Fargo Force ====
| April 22 | Lincoln Stars | 1 – 4 | Fargo Force | Ice Box |
| 3:22 - Eric Meland (1) | | First period | No scoring |
| No scoring | | Second period | Chase Grant (1) - 14:24; Andy Taranto (6) - 16:35 |
| No scoring | | Third period | Corey Leivermann (2) - 10:00; Chase Grant (2) - en - 19:40 |
| Kevin Murdock (20 saves / 23 shots) | | Goalie stats | Mike Lee (37 saves / 38 shots) |

| April 24 | Lincoln Stars | 3 – 7 | Fargo Force | Ice Box |
| 13:06 - David Gerths (1); 14:05 - Kirt Hill (3) | | First period | Chase Grant (3) - 3:07; Eamonn McDermott (1) - pp - 9:39; Tom McCarthy (1) - pp - 11:02; Josh Birkholz (1) - pp - 16:57 |
| 3:05 - Kirt Hill (4) | | Second period | Josh Birkholz (2) - pp - 1:31 |
| No scoring | | Third period | Luke Witkowski (2) - pp - 2:41; Johnnie Searfoss (2) - sh - 15:04 |
| Anthony Borelli (3 saves / 6 shots); Kevin Murdock (19 saves / 23 shots) | | Goalie stats | Mike Lee (31 saves / 34 shots) |

| April 25 | Fargo Force | 2 – 0 | Lincoln Stars | Scheels Arena |
| 15:02 - Chris Franks (1) | | First period | No scoring |
| 9:03 - Josh Birkholz (3) | | Second period | No scoring |
| No scoring | | Third period | No scoring |
| Mike Lee (32 saves / 32 shots) | | Goalie stats | Anthony Borelli (26 saves / 28 shots) |

| Fargo wins series 3 – 0 |

== Clark Cup Finals ==
=== (E3) Indiana Ice vs. (W3) Fargo Force ===
| May 1 | Indiana Ice | 1 – 2 | Fargo Force | Pepsi Coliseum |
| No scoring | | First period | No scoring |
| 7:19 - pp - Loren Barron (2) | | Second period | No scoring |
| No scoring | | Third period | Eamonn McDermott (2) - 9:31; Steve Spinell (1) - 19:22 |
| Brett Bennett (28 saves / 30 shots) | | Goalie stats | Mike Lee (33 saves / 34 shots) |

| May 2 | Indiana Ice | 5 – 2 | Fargo Force | Pepsi Coliseum |
| No scoring | | First period | No scoring |
| 12:27 - Stanislav Galiev (5); 16:15 - John Parker (2) | | Second period | Matt Leitner (2) - 12:56 |
| 5:42 - Grant Blakey (2); 5:51 - Sebastian Geoffrion (3); 18:04 - pp - Brandon Richardson (6) | | Third period | Andy Taranto (7) - pp - 15:13 |
| Brett Bennett (23 saves / 25 shots) | | Goalie stats | Mike Lee (30 saves / 35 shots) |

| May 6 | Fargo Force | 0 – 6 | Indiana Ice | Scheels Arena |
| No scoring | | First period | Shane Berschbach (3) - pp - 3:30; Ben Albertson (5) - 4:01; Max Cook (3) - 4:14 |
| No scoring | | Second period | Michael Cichy (5) - 6:09; Michael Cichy (6) - pp - 13:04 |
| No scoring | | Third period | John Parker (3) - 16:45 |
| Mike Lee (4 saves / 7 shots); Cody Campbell (18 saves / 21 shots) | | Goalie stats | Brett Bennett (20 saves / 20 shots) |

| May 8 | Fargo Force | 1 – 5 | Indiana Ice | Scheels Arena |
| 3:47 - Nate Condon (1) | | First period | No scoring |
| No scoring | | Second period | Shane Berschbach (4) - pp - 8:36; Brandon Richardson (7) - 14:08 |
| No scoring | | Third period | Brandon Richardson (8) - 2:21; Grant Blakey (3) - 4:48; Zach Golembiewski (7) - en - 14:46 |
| Mike Lee (14 saves / 18 shots) | | Goalie stats | Brett Bennett (36 saves / 37 shots) |

| Indiana wins series 3 – 1 |

== Awards ==
- Coach of the Year: Dean Blais Fargo Force
- Curt Hammer Award: Mike Walsh Chicago Steel
- Defenseman of the Year: John Moore Chicago Steel
- Executive of the Year: Jim Pflug Lincoln Stars
- Forward of the Year: Andrew Miller Chicago Steel
- General Manager of the Year: Jon Cooper Green Bay Gamblers
- Goaltender of the Year: Mike Lee Fargo Force
- Organization of the Year: Fargo Force
- Player of the Year: Andrew Miller Chicago Steel
- Rookie of the Year: Louis Leblanc Omaha Lancers
- Scholar-Athlete of the Year: Jeff Teglia Omaha Lancers

=== First Team All-Stars ===
- Brett Bennett (Goalie) Indiana Ice
- John Moore (Defense) Chicago Steel
- Matt Donovan (Defense) Cedar Rapids RoughRiders
- Andrew Miller (Forward) Chicago Steel
- Craig Smith (Forward) Waterloo Black Hawks

=== Second Team All-Stars ===
- Kevin Murdock (Goalie) Lincoln Stars
- Jake Newton (Defense) Lincoln Stars
- David Makowski (Defense) Green Bay Gamblers
- Stephane Da Costa (Forward) Sioux City Musketeers
- Mike Seidel (Forward) Cedar Rapids RoughRiders
- Anthony Taranto (Forward) Fargo Force
