= Louis Leblanc =

Canadian ice hockey player (born 1991)

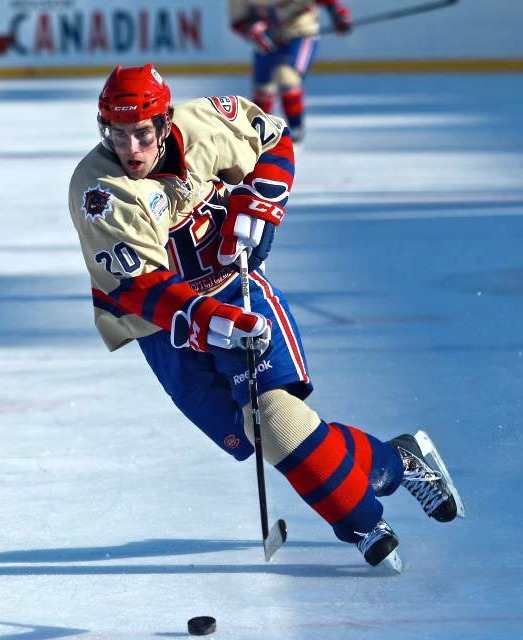
- Leblanc with the Hamilton Bulldogs in 2012
- Born: January 26, 1991 (age 35) Pointe-Claire, Quebec, Canada
- Height: 6 ft 0 in (183 cm)
- Weight: 183 lb (83 kg; 13 st 1 lb)
- Position: Centre
- Shot: Right
- Played for: Montreal Canadiens; MsHK Žilina; HC Slovan Bratislava; Lausanne HC
- NHL draft: 18th overall, 2009; Montreal Canadiens
- Playing career: 2011–2016

Louis Jean Joseph Leblanc (born January 26, 1991) is a Canadian former professional ice hockey player. A centre, Leblanc played minor hockey in the Montreal region before he moved to the United States in 2008, playing one season with the Omaha Lancers of the United States Hockey League (USHL) and becoming Rookie of the Year. Eligible for the 2009 NHL entry draft, he was selected 18th overall by the Montreal Canadiens. He then enrolled at Harvard University and spent one season with the Crimson, being named Ivy League Rookie of the Year, before he signed a contract with the Canadiens in 2010. Later that year Leblanc joined the Montreal Juniors, who had earlier acquired his Quebec Major Junior Hockey League (QMJHL) playing rights.

Leblanc spent three seasons in the Canadiens organization, mainly playing for their American Hockey League (AHL) affiliate but appearing in only 50 National Hockey League (NHL) games over two seasons, before being traded in 2014 to the Anaheim Ducks, who kept him in the AHL. In 2015, Leblanc moved to Europe, joining HC Slovan Bratislava of the Kontinental Hockey League (KHL), though he played only seven games for them before being released. After appearing in four games for Lausanne HC of the Swiss National League A, he retired from hockey. Internationally, Leblanc played in the 2008 Ivan Hlinka Memorial Tournament, where Canada won the gold medal, and in the 2011 World Junior Ice Hockey Championships, where he helped Canada win a silver medal. Leblanc was considered a draft bust, having failed to reach his potential and retiring from hockey at an early age.

== Early life ==
Leblanc was born to Yves and Marie Leblanc in Pointe-Claire, a suburb of Montreal, on January 26, 1991. Yves Leblanc was employed as a chemist by Merck Frosst, one of the world's largest pharmaceutical companies, in Montreal before transferring to their facility at Cambridge, Massachusetts, in 2009; he worked four-day weeks and returned to Montreal on weekends. Marie was a piano teacher. Louis' younger brother Jean also plays hockey. Growing up in the West Island town of Kirkland, Quebec, Leblanc skated from the age of three and entered organized hockey two years later. As a youth, he played in the 2004 Quebec International Pee-Wee Hockey Tournament with the Lakeshore Minor Hockey Association. After playing with Lakeshore, it became apparent that he could pursue the sport at a higher level; at the age of 15, he joined the Lac St-Louis Lions, a midget team based in Montreal. He played two seasons for the Lions and led the triple-A league in scoring both times.

== Playing career ==
=== Junior ===
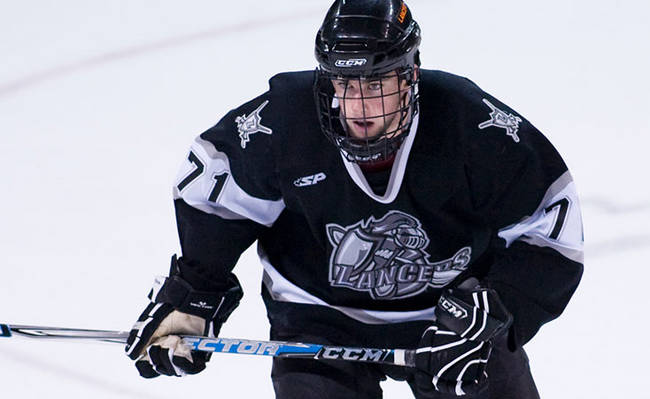
Leblanc playing for the Omaha Lancers in 2009

Leblanc was selected 18th overall by the Val-d'Or Foreurs in the 2007 Quebec Major Junior Hockey League (QMJHL) draft. As he wished to attend an American university, he went instead to the Omaha Lancers of the United States Hockey League (USHL) where he spent the 2008–09 season, playing in 60 games and finishing with 28 goals and 31 assists for 59 points. He led the team in points scored and tied for tenth overall in the USHL; his goal total was tied for eighth overall, and the six game-winning goals Leblanc scored were tied for second overall. In recognition of his performance that season, the USHL named him the league's Rookie of the Year.

At the end of the season, Leblanc was ranked by the NHL Central Scouting Bureau as a top prospect for the 2009 NHL entry draft; their final list had him 13th overall among North American skaters, and he was ultimately selected 18th overall by the Montreal Canadiens, who hosted the draft. The last francophone selected in the first round of the Entry Draft by the Canadiens had been Eric Chouinard in 1998. Coaches and scouts for the Canadiens praised Leblanc for his speed, determination, goal-scoring ability, and willingness to go to the corners for the puck. Canadiens General Manager Bob Gainey felt that Leblanc's decision to move to the United States to play in the USHL—rather than stay in his native Quebec with the QMJHL, which would have been the easier choice—would help his development as a player and displayed the type of character the team sought. Leblanc enrolled at Harvard University in September 2009, and began playing for the university's hockey team, the Crimson. In his one year at Harvard, he led the team in goals (11), assists (12) and points (23). Named the Ivy League Rookie of the Year, he was also a finalist for the ECAC Rookie of the Year.

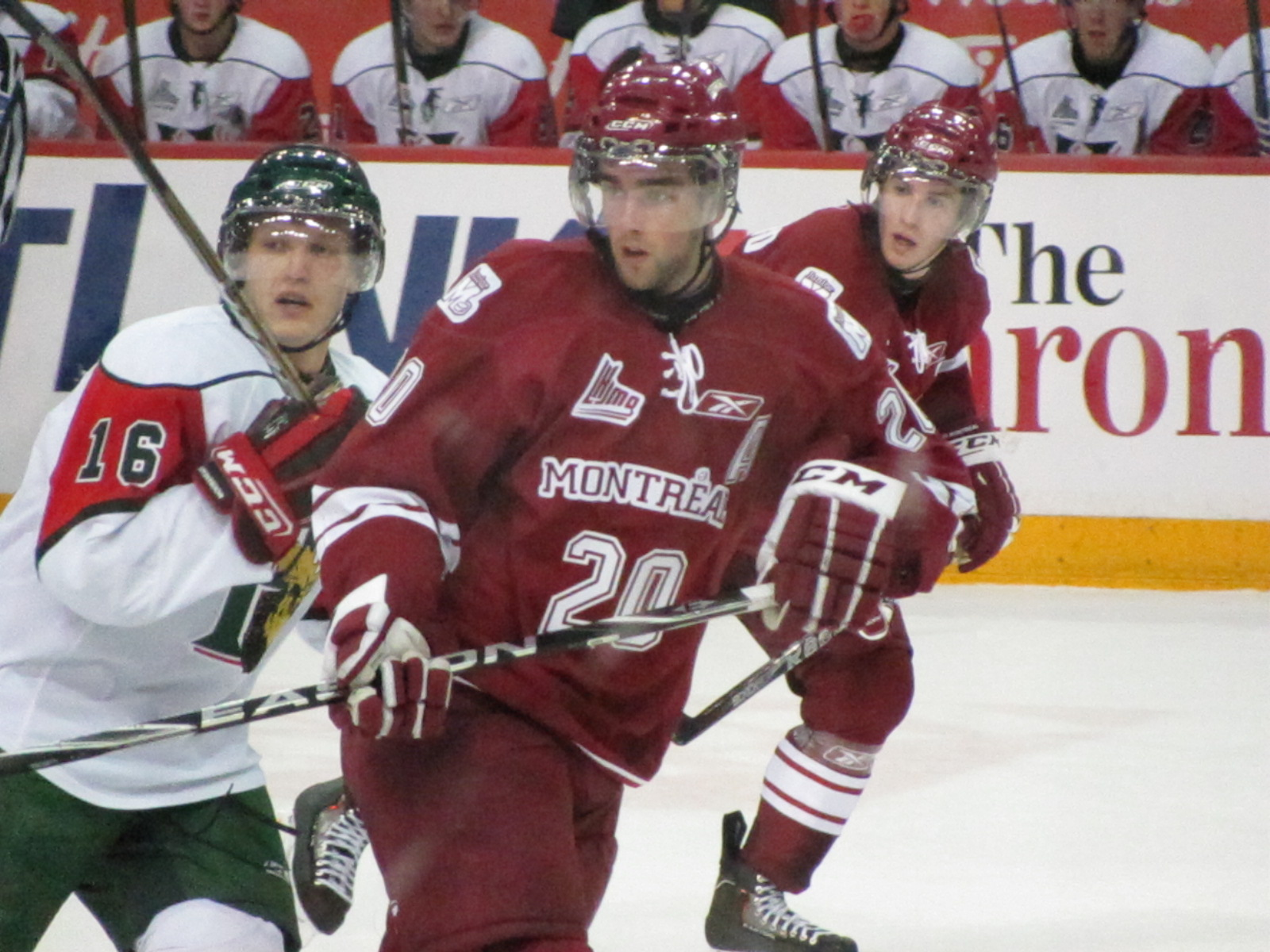
Leblanc while with the Montreal Juniors in 2010

In mid-2010, Leblanc's QMJHL rights were owned by the Montreal Junior Hockey Club (Montreal Juniors)—his rights having been traded from Val-d'Or to the Chicoutimi Saguenéens in 2009, then to the Juniors in June 2010. On July 30, Leblanc signed a three-year contract with the Canadiens, and he attended a training camp with the team in September. By signing a professional contract, he forfeited his National Collegiate Athletic Association (NCAA) eligibility and had to leave Harvard, being considered a professional according to NCAA standards. Following the camp, the Canadiens announced on September 27 that they were returning him to the Juniors for the 2010–11 season. He finished 2010–11 with 58 points in 51 games for the Juniors. In the off-season, the team relocated to Boisbriand, a suburb of Montreal, and was renamed the Blainville-Boisbriand Armada; the team traded Leblanc's major junior rights to the Shawinigan Cataractes. Before he had a chance to play for the Cataractes, the Canadiens exercised their contract rights to him, putting him in the Hamilton Bulldogs of the American Hockey League (AHL), the Canadiens' minor league affiliate.

=== Professional ===
Leblanc made his professional debut on October 27, 2011, with the Bulldogs, and scored three points, including the game-winning goal in overtime, to give his team a 3–2 victory over the Rochester Americans. After 14 games with the Bulldogs, in which he recorded 10 points, Leblanc was recalled by the Canadiens and made his NHL debut on November 30 against the Anaheim Ducks. His first point, an assist on a goal by Andrei Kostitsyn, came on December 3, against the Los Angeles Kings, while his first NHL goal was against Sergei Bobrovsky in a 4–3 loss against the Philadelphia Flyers on December 15. Leblanc split the remainder of the season between Montreal and Hamilton. He played 42 games for the Canadiens, with whom he had 5 goals and 5 assists, and 31 games with the Bulldogs, scoring 11 goals and 11 assists; he was the leading Canadien goal-scorer among rookies, and was second in both assists and points. The following season was delayed by the 2012–13 NHL lockout; when the NHL resumed play in January 2013, Leblanc stayed in the AHL with Hamilton, where he recorded 18 points in 62 games, minor injuries restricting his playing time and limiting his production. Before the 2013–14 NHL season, Leblanc was once again assigned to Hamilton, one of the first players the Canadiens cut from their roster; with his early demotion to the AHL, it was speculated in the media whether Leblanc, who had one year remaining on his contract with the Canadiens, had a future with the team. He was recalled to the Canadiens early in the season and played eight games for them, going pointless before being sent back to the AHL, his NHL career was once again questioned. In the 70 games he played for Hamilton, Leblanc scored 13 goals and recorded 15 assists. As Leblanc had failed to establish himself on the Canadiens roster, he was traded to the Anaheim Ducks on June 14, 2014, in exchange for a conditional fifth-round pick in the 2015 NHL entry draft. A restricted free agent, Leblanc signed a one-year extension with the Ducks, though he spent the season with their AHL affiliate, the Norfolk Admirals, scoring 29 points in 71 games.

On July 17, 2015, Leblanc signed as a free agent to a one-year contract with the New York Islanders. After failing to secure a spot in New York's lineup and being assigned to the team's AHL affiliate, the Bridgeport Sound Tigers, the team agreed to release him from his contract and he quickly signed with HC Slovan Bratislava of the Kontinental Hockey League (KHL). Visa issues initially prevented Leblanc from joining the team, so he was loaned to MsHK Žilina of the Slovak Extraliga. Once cleared to join Slovan, Leblanc played only seven games, failing to record a point, before being released. He was criticized by the coach, Miloš Říha, for playing "un-Canadian" (not physical enough). As the KHL had a limit on foreign players, Leblanc needed to be among the best players to retain his place; the coach did not judge Leblanc to meet that standard. Instead, he signed with Lausanne HC of the Swiss National League A (NLA). He finished the season with them, scoring one goal in four games, and decided to retire in June. He was considered one of the Canadiens' biggest draft busts in the period between 2000 and 2009, having failed to reach the potential expected at the time of his selection.

== International play ==
Louis Leblanc
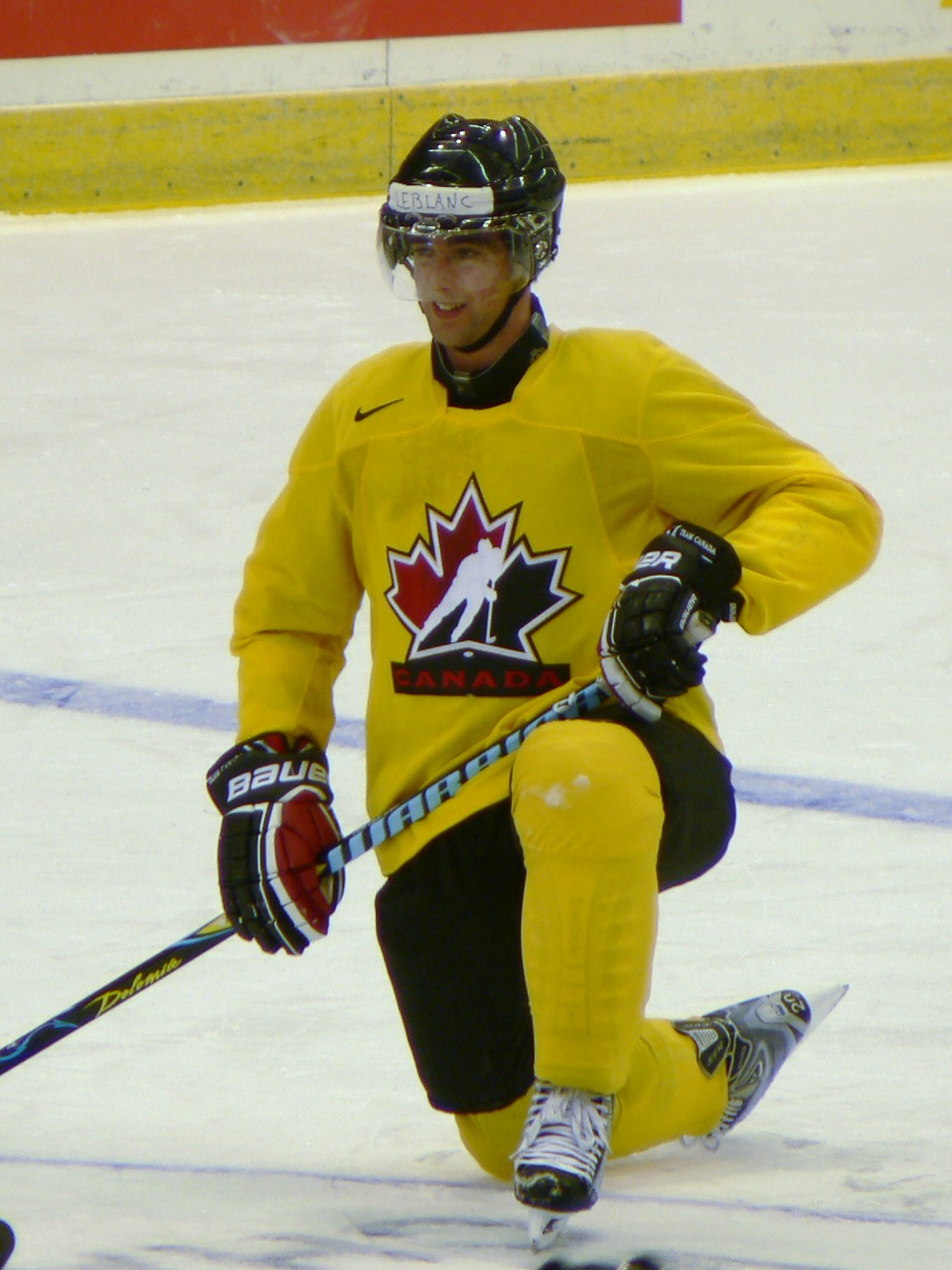
- Leblanc at training camp for Team Canada in 2009

Medal record

Representing Canada

Ice hockey

World Junior Championships
Silver medal – second place	2011 USA	

Ivan Hlinka Memorial Tournament
Gold medal – first place	2008 Slovakia	

Leblanc first participated in an international tournament when he played for the Canadian national junior team at the 2008 Ivan Hlinka Memorial Tournament in the Czech Republic and Slovakia in August 2008. He led the team with three goals and added two assists for five points as Canada won the gold medal. Leblanc was then invited to try out for the national junior team before the 2010 World Junior Ice Hockey Championships, but was one of the last players cut from the team. There was speculation that his participation in the NCAA rather than the Canadian Hockey League (CHL) hindered his chances of making the team, as CHL players had played considerably more games than those in the NCAA. Leblanc also had university exams scheduled around the time of the camp. He was invited to the summer camp the following year in St. John's, Newfoundland and Labrador, and was one of the top scorers at the camp. After the pre-tournament camp in December 2010, Leblanc was named to the final roster for the 2011 World Juniors.

In Canada's first game against Russia, Leblanc earned his first point, an assist. He scored his first goal, short-handed (Canada's first in the tournament), and added an assist in the second game, versus the Czech Republic. He later recorded an assist in the gold medal game, where Canada lost to Russia 5–3. He finished the tournament with three goals and seven points over seven games and fourth overall on the team in scoring.

== Personal life ==
Leblanc was in a relationship with tennis player Aleksandra Wozniak, who is also from the Montreal region. When Leblanc was assigned to the AHL before the 2013–14 season, Wozniak critiqued the move on Twitter, saying Leblanc had not been given "a fair shot". While at Harvard, Leblanc majored in economics. After turning pro, he took a business class at McGill University in Montreal when he moved back to the city in 2010. When he announced his retirement in 2016, it was reported he planned to return to Harvard later that year.

== Career statistics ==
=== Regular season and playoffs ===
			Regular season					Playoffs
Season	Team	League	GP	G	A	Pts	PIM	GP	G	A	Pts	PIM
2006–07	Lac St-Louis Lions	QMAAA	40	31	18	49	72	22	14	7	21	10
2007–08	Lac St-Louis Lions	QMAAA	43	54	37	91	152	14	8	14	22	76
2008–09	Omaha Lancers	USHL	60	28	31	59	78	3	2	1	3	2
2009–10	Harvard University	ECAC	31	11	12	23	50	—	—	—	—	—
2010–11	Montreal Juniors	QMJHL	51	26	32	58	100	10	6	3	9	16
2011–12	Hamilton Bulldogs	AHL	31	11	11	22	30	—	—	—	—	—
2011–12	Montreal Canadiens	NHL	42	5	5	10	28	—	—	—	—	—
2012–13	Hamilton Bulldogs	AHL	62	10	8	18	53	—	—	—	—	—
2013–14	Hamilton Bulldogs	AHL	70	13	15	28	63	—	—	—	—	—
2013–14	Montreal Canadiens	NHL	8	0	0	0	4	—	—	—	—	—
2014–15	Norfolk Admirals	AHL	71	14	15	29	38	—	—	—	—	—
2015–16	HC Slovan Bratislava	KHL	7	0	0	0	16	—	—	—	—	—
2015–16	MsHK Žilina	Slovak	4	3	1	4	10	—	—	—	—	—
2015–16	Lausanne HC	NLA	4	1	0	1	25	—	—	—	—	—
AHL totals			234	48	49	97	184	—	—	—	—	—
NHL totals			50	5	5	10	32	—	—	—	—	—

=== International ===
Year	Team	Event	Result	GP	G	A	Pts	PIM
2008	Canada Quebec	U17	7th	5	3	3	6	8
2008	Canada	IH18	1st place, gold medalist(s)	4	3	2	5	0
2011	Canada	WJC	2nd place, silver medalist(s)	7	3	4	7	2
Junior totals				16	9	9	18	10

== Awards and honours ==
Award	Year
USHL
Rookie of the Year	2009
College
Ivy League Rookie of the Year	2010
All-ECAC Rookie Team	2010

Awards and achievements
Preceded by Max Pacioretty	Montreal Canadiens first-round draft pick 2009	Succeeded by Jarred Tinordi
