= Kyle Flanagan (ice hockey) =

American ice hockey player

- Born: December 30, 1988 (age 37) Canton, New York, U.S.
- Height: 5 ft 9 in (175 cm)
- Weight: 179 lb (81 kg; 12 st 11 lb)
- Position: Center
- Shot: Left
- Played for: Adirondack Phantoms; Modo Hockey; Binghamton Senators; Belleville Senators
- NHL draft: Undrafted
- Playing career: 2013–2018

Kyle Flanagan (born December 30, 1988) is an American former professional ice hockey player who competed in the American Hockey League (AHL), playing for the Adirondack Phantoms, Binghamton Senators, and Belleville Senators during his career.

== Playing career ==
Flanagan played collegiate hockey for the St. Lawrence Saints in the NCAA Men's Division I ECAC Hockey conference. His impressive performance during his senior season earned him a spot on the 2012–13 ECAC All-Conference First Team. On March 21, 2013, he signed a one-year entry-level contract with the Philadelphia Flyers.

On August 1, 2014, Flanagan began his European career by signing a one-year contract with Modo Hockey of the Swedish Hockey League as a free agent. During the 2014–15 season, he appeared in 38 games, recording 4 goals and a total of 15 points, while the team failed to qualify for the playoffs and narrowly escaped relegation.

On September 22, 2015, Flanagan joined the Stockton Heat's training camp after receiving an invitation and was subsequently signed by their ECHL affiliate, marking his return to professional hockey with the Adirondack Thunder. Following his 44-game stint with the Binghamton Senators, he secured a two-year contract in the AHL on July 26, 2016.

After completing his contract with the Belleville Senators after the 2017-18 AHL season, Flanagan decided to step away from professional hockey. Citing the culmination of a six-year journey through various leagues and teams, he officially announced his retirement on August 22, 2018.

== Career statistics ==
			Regular season					Playoffs
Season	Team	League	GP	G	A	Pts	PIM	GP	G	A	Pts	PIM
2007–08	Cedar Rapids RoughRiders	USHL	57	12	25	37	40	3	0	0	0	0
2008–09	Cedar Rapids RoughRiders	USHL	60	17	40	57	24	5	6	1	7	8
2009–10	St. Lawrence Saints	ECAC	32	5	23	28	26	—	—	—	—	—
2010–11	St. Lawrence Saints	ECAC	39	12	23	35	38	—	—	—	—	—
2011–12	St. Lawrence Saints	ECAC	28	14	23	37	22	—	—	—	—	—
2012–13	St. Lawrence Saints	ECAC	35	15	32	47	42	—	—	—	—	—
2012–13	Adirondack Phantoms	AHL	13	1	6	7	4	—	—	—	—	—
2013–14	Adirondack Phantoms	AHL	63	6	16	22	14	—	—	—	—	—
2014–15	Modo Hockey	SHL	38	4	11	15	22	—	—	—	—	—
2015–16	Adirondack Thunder	ECHL	12	2	8	10	10	—	—	—	—	—
2015–16	Binghamton Senators	AHL	44	6	14	20	16	—	—	—	—	—
2016–17	Binghamton Senators	AHL	68	9	20	29	23	—	—	—	—	—
2017–18	Belleville Senators	AHL	17	1	3	4	8	—	—	—	—	—
AHL totals			205	23	59	82	65	—	—	—	—	—

== Awards and honors ==
Award	Year
College
All-ECAC Hockey Third Team	2011–12
All-ECAC Hockey First Team	2012–13
AHCA East First-Team All-American	2012–13
