= Laura (1945 song) =

Lyrical adaptation of "Laura" by David Raksin, lyrics written by Johnny Mercer

Song
- Published: 1945 by Robbins Music
- Composer: David Raksin
- Lyricist: Johnny Mercer

"Laura" is a 1945 popular song; its music was composed by David Raksin for the 1944 American film Laura. The song is heard frequently in the movie, which stars Gene Tierney and Dana Andrews. The film's director, Otto Preminger, had originally wanted to use Duke Ellington's "Sophisticated Lady" as the theme, but Raksin was not convinced that it was suitable. Angered, Preminger gave Raksin one weekend to compose an alternative melody. Raksin later said that when, over that weekend, his wife sent him a "Dear John" letter, the haunting theme seemed to write itself.

The lyrics were written by Johnny Mercer after the film made the tune popular, he titled song "Laura". According to Mercer, he had not yet seen the movie when he wrote the lyrics but was aware that it was a romantic, somewhat haunting story.

Laura is the face in the misty light, footsteps that you hear down the hall
The laugh that floats on the summer night that you can never quite recall
And you see Laura on a train that is passing through, those eyes how familiar they seem
She gave your very first kiss to you, that was Laura but she's only a dream

The song became a jazz standard and has been recorded more than 400 times. Some of the best-known versions are by Woody Herman, Dave Brubeck, Johnny Johnston, Emil Newman, David Rose, Billy Eckstine, Charlie Parker, J. J. Johnson, Carly Simon, Frank Sinatra, Spike Jones and Julie London (included on her 1955 debut album Julie Is Her Name, Vol. 1). The first 10 notes of the song are sometimes "quoted" during jazz solos, especially since Dizzy Gillespie did it during his "Perdido" solo at the Massey Hall concert in May 1953.

== Some notable recordings ==
- Emil Newman (first performance, October 11, 1944)
- Stan Kenton (1946)
- Sidney Bechet (1947)
- David Rose (1947)
- Frank Sinatra (1947 in The Voice of Frank Sinatra and 1957 in Where Are You?)
- Dave Brubeck (trio, 1949)
- Charlie Parker – Charlie Parker with Strings (1950)
- Charles Mingus – Mingus Three (1957)
- Coleman Hawkins – The Hawk Flies High (1957)
- Ella Fitzgerald – Ella Fitzgerald Sings the Johnny Mercer Songbook (1964)
- Harry James – Laura (Harmony HS 11326, 1969)
- Dexter Gordon – Sophisticated Giant (1977)
- Billy Eckstine – Everything I Have Is Yours (album) (1995)
- Robert Wyatt / Gilad Atzmon / Ros Stephen – For the Ghosts Within (2010)
