= Kyle Cumiskey =

Canadian ice hockey player (born 1986)

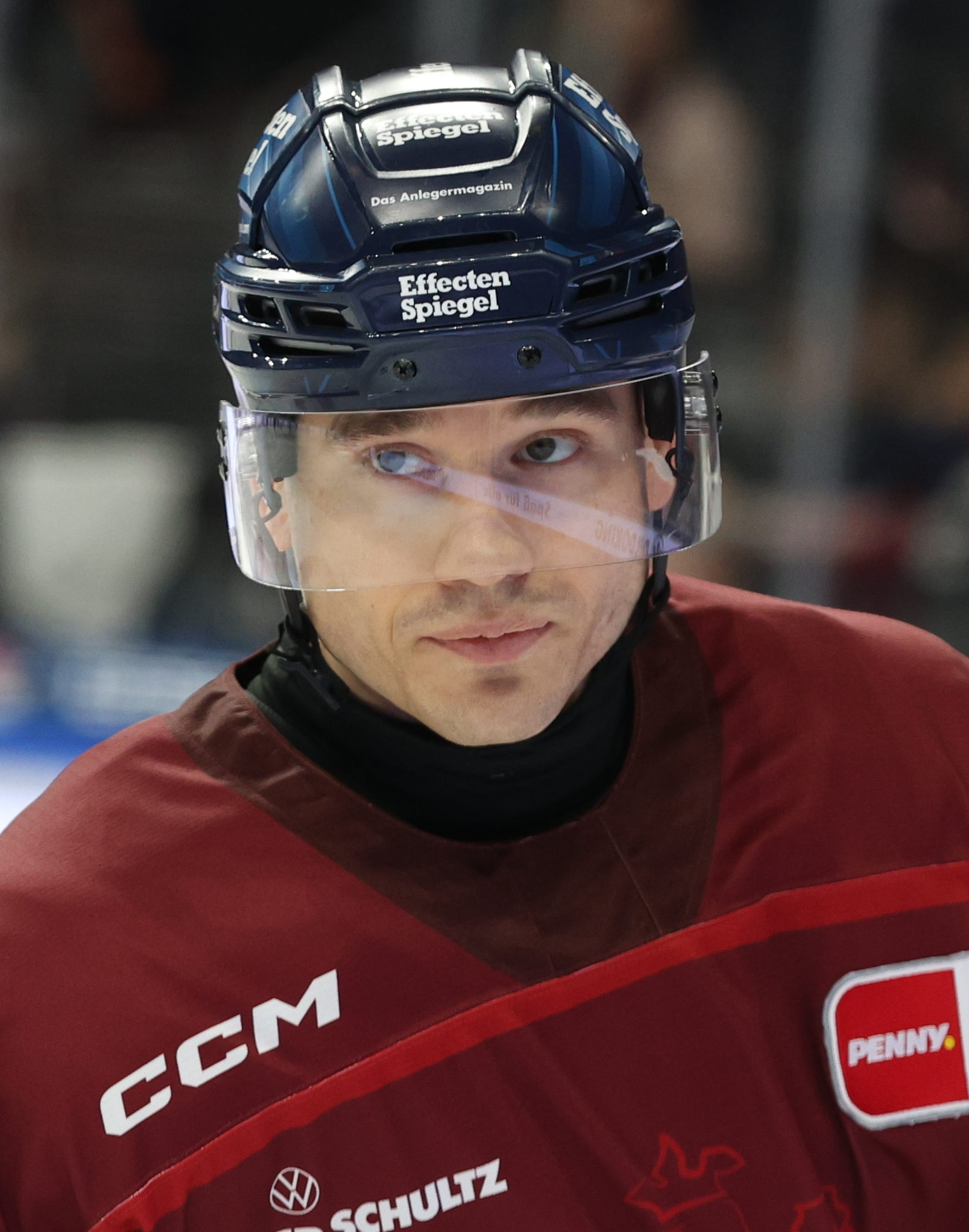
- Cumiskey with the Düsseldorfer EG in October 2024
- Born: December 2, 1986 (age 39) Abbotsford, British Columbia, Canada
- Height: 5 ft 10 in (178 cm)
- Weight: 185 lb (84 kg; 13 st 3 lb)
- Position: Defence
- Shoots: Left
- team Former teams: Free agent Colorado Avalanche; Modo Hockey; Chicago Blackhawks; Skellefteå AIK; Düsseldorfer EG
- National team: Canada
- NHL draft: 222nd overall, 2005; Colorado Avalanche
- Playing career: 2006–present

Kyle Cumiskey (born December 2, 1986) is a Canadian professional ice hockey defenceman who is currently a free agent. He last played with the Düsseldorfer EG in the Deutsche Eishockey Liga (DEL). Cumiskey won the 2015 Stanley Cup with the Chicago Blackhawks.

== Playing career ==
As a youth, Cumiskey played in the 1999 Quebec International Pee-Wee Hockey Tournament with a minor ice hockey team from Abbotsford, British Columbia. He later played one year of Jr.A. hockey with the Penticton Panthers of the BCHL. He was not selected in the 2001 WHL Bantam Draft, and signed as a free agent with the Kelowna Rockets in 2003.

Cumiskey played junior hockey for the Kelowna Rockets of the Western Hockey League for three seasons, scoring 79 points in 177 games. He was drafted by the Colorado Avalanche in the seventh round of the 2005 NHL entry draft, 222nd overall, after his second junior season.

Cumiskey played most of the 2006–07 season for the Albany River Rats of the American Hockey League but appeared in nine games for the Avalanche. His first career NHL goal was the only goal in regulation for the Avalanche in a 2–1 shootout win over Manny Fernandez and the Minnesota Wild on January 6, 2007. During the next two seasons, Cumiskey split time between the Lake Erie Monsters of the AHL and the Avalanche; however, he was sidelined by injuries for a significant amount of time in both years. A groin injury caused Cumiskey to miss 17 games in the 2007–08 season, and his 2008–09 season ended early with shoulder surgery on February 18.

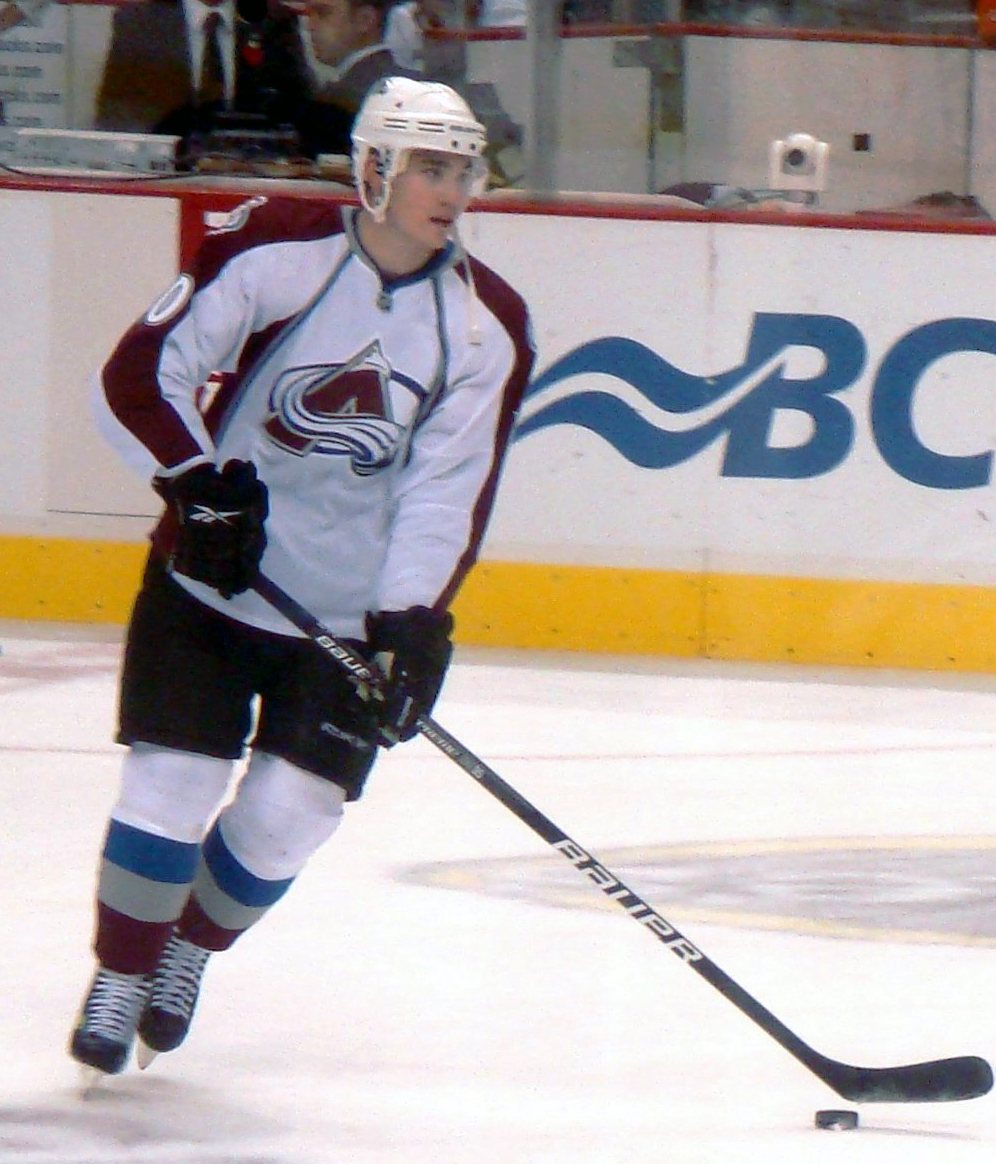
Cumiskey during his tenure with the Colorado Avalanche in November 2009

For the first time in his NHL career, Cumiskey made the opening night roster with the Avalanche at the beginning of the 2009–10 season.

In the offseason before the 2011–12 season, Cumiskey signed a one-year two-way deal with Colorado days before training camp. During the preseason Cumiskey suffered a concussion and was placed on injured reserve by Colorado. On October 7, 2011, one day before the Avs season opener, he was placed on waivers. On the following day, Cumiskey was traded to the Anaheim Ducks for Jake Newton and a conditional draft pick. Although he was recalled by Anaheim on multiple occasions, Cumiskey never made his debut for the Ducks, playing in 57 games with AHL affiliate, the Syracuse Crunch.

On July 8, 2012, with his NHL rights still owned by the Ducks, Cumiskey signed abroad to a one-year deal with Modo Hockey of the Swedish Elitserien. In the 2012-13 season, Cumiskey rebounded with a successful offensive season with Modo, finishing fifth in league scoring amongst defenseman with 32 points in 46 games.

On June 18, 2013, with the intention to resume his NHL career, Cumiskey agreed to return to the Anaheim Ducks on a one-year contract. After partaking in the Ducks 2013 training camp, Cumiskey was reassigned by the Ducks to their AHL affiliate, the Norfolk Admirals. On September 23, 2013, Cumiskey agreed to mutually terminate his contract with the Ducks and later returned to Sweden for a second consecutive season with Modo Hockey on October 2, 2013. In the 2013–14 season, Cumiskey contributed with 28 points in 45 games from the blueline to help Modo qualify for the playoffs.

On July 2, 2014, Cumiskey returned to the NHL, signing a one-year two-way contract as a free agent with the Chicago Blackhawks. Cumiskey started the 2014–15 season with the Blackhawks, but did not appear in any regular season games. On October 17, 2014, Cumiskey was assigned to the Rockford IceHogs, the Blackhawks' AHL affiliate, after clearing waivers. On February 13, 2015, Cumiskey was recalled by the Blackhawks and made his first return to the NHL since 2011, featuring in a 3–1 victory over the New Jersey Devils. He appeared in 7 scoreless games with Chicago before he was returned to end the regular season in the AHL. Cumiskey returned to Chicago to begin their playoff run, and made his post-season debut in the Conference finals against the Anaheim Ducks. Used in a depth defenseman role, Cumiskey was used sparingly but appeared in the first three Cup finals games against the Tampa Bay Lightning to help the Blackhawks claim the Stanley Cup.

In the off-season, Cumiskey underwent surgery on a lower-body injury and after going unsigned over the summer was invited to return to the Blackhawks training camp on a try-out contract. On October 15, 2015, Cumiskey signed a one-year contract with the Blackhawks. He was assigned to the Rockford IceHogs, the Blackhawks' AHL affiliate, a day later after clearing waivers. In an injury-blighted season, Cumiskey appeared in only 17 games with the IceHogs for 5 points.

A free agent the following summer, Cumiskey returned to Sweden to continue his professional career. With the demotion of former club Modo Hockey to the HockeyAllsvenskan, Cumiskey opted to sign a one-year deal with SHL club Skellefteå AIK, on July 22, 2016. In the 2016–17 season, Cumiskey began recovering from off-season surgery. In his return he was limited to just 12 games affected by injury before he mutually agreed to terminate his contract mid-season on February 6, 2017.

After a year’s hiatus and recovery from injury, Cumiskey opted to try and reignite his professional career, attending the Toronto Marlies 2018 training camp on a try-out basis on September 27, 2018. With the 2018–19 season underway, Cumiskey was soon signed to a professional try-out contract with the Marlies on October 14, 2018. He appeared in one game with Toronto before he was released from his try-out due to a roster squeeze. On October 26, 2018, Cumiskey signed an ECHL contract with the Marlies affiliate, the Newfoundland Growlers. Cumiskey potted 9 assists in 11 games with the Growlers before signing a tryout with the Providence Bruins of the AHL on November 18, 2018. After 10 games, helping stabilise the Bruins blueline, Cumiskey was signed for the remainder of the season in Providence on December 14, 2018. He finished the regular season, appearing in 35 games for 18 points.

A free agent heading into the 2019–20 season, Cumiskey signed a professional tryout contract with the Binghamton Devils, affiliate of the New Jersey Devils, on October 29, 2019. Cumiskey made 34 appearances with the Devils, compiling 3 goals and 15 points before the season was cancelled due to the COVID-19 pandemic.

With the 2020–21 North American season set to be delayed, Cumiskey opted for a European return, extending his career with a one-year contract with German club Düsseldorfer EG of the DEL, on December 13, 2020.

== International play ==
On May 1, 2010, Cumiskey was to named to the Canadian team for the 2010 Men's World Ice Hockey Championships. He made his international debut, and recorded an assist, in a 5–1 preliminary round win against Italy on May 8, 2010. Kyle finished the tournament with 3 assists and was named Canada's best player in the eliminating Quarterfinal loss against Russia.

== Career statistics ==
=== Regular season and playoffs ===
| | | | Regular season | | | | | Playoffs |
| Season | Team | League | GP | G | A | Pts | PIM | GP | G | A | Pts | PIM |
|---|---|---|---|---|---|---|---|---|---|---|---|---|
| 2002–03 | Penticton Panthers | BCHL | 59 | 10 | 11 | 21 | 36 | — | — | — | — | — |
| 2003–04 | Penticton Panthers | BCHL | 7 | 1 | 1 | 2 | 6 | — | — | — | — | — |
| 2003–04 | Kelowna Rockets | WHL | 54 | 2 | 7 | 9 | 20 | 17 | 0 | 0 | 0 | 0 |
| 2004–05 | Kelowna Rockets | WHL | 72 | 4 | 36 | 40 | 47 | 24 | 0 | 13 | 13 | 12 |
| 2005–06 | Kelowna Rockets | WHL | 51 | 6 | 24 | 30 | 52 | 12 | 0 | 6 | 6 | 8 |
| 2006–07 | Colorado Avalanche | NHL | 9 | 1 | 1 | 2 | 2 | — | — | — | — | — |
| 2006–07 | Albany River Rats | AHL | 63 | 7 | 26 | 33 | 32 | 5 | 0 | 2 | 2 | 6 |
| 2007–08 | Colorado Avalanche | NHL | 38 | 0 | 5 | 5 | 16 | — | — | — | — | — |
| 2007–08 | Lake Erie Monsters | AHL | 5 | 1 | 1 | 2 | 4 | — | — | — | — | — |
| 2008–09 | Colorado Avalanche | NHL | 6 | 0 | 0 | 0 | 0 | — | — | — | — | — |
| 2008–09 | Lake Erie Monsters | AHL | 28 | 5 | 12 | 17 | 16 | — | — | — | — | — |
| 2009–10 | Colorado Avalanche | NHL | 61 | 7 | 13 | 20 | 20 | 6 | 1 | 1 | 2 | 2 |
| 2010–11 | Colorado Avalanche | NHL | 18 | 1 | 7 | 8 | 10 | — | — | — | — | — |
| 2011–12 | Syracuse Crunch | AHL | 57 | 6 | 23 | 29 | 44 | 4 | 0 | 1 | 1 | 0 |
| 2012–13 | Modo Hockey | SEL | 46 | 7 | 25 | 32 | 30 | 5 | 1 | 4 | 5 | 4 |
| 2013–14 | Modo Hockey | SHL | 45 | 4 | 24 | 28 | 16 | 2 | 0 | 0 | 0 | 0 |
| 2014–15 | Chicago Blackhawks | NHL | 7 | 0 | 0 | 0 | 0 | 9 | 0 | 0 | 0 | 0 |
| 2014–15 | Rockford IceHogs | AHL | 54 | 2 | 18 | 20 | 10 | — | — | — | — | — |
| 2015–16 | Rockford IceHogs | AHL | 17 | 1 | 4 | 5 | 6 | — | — | — | — | — |
| 2016–17 | Skellefteå AIK | SHL | 12 | 1 | 3 | 4 | 4 | — | — | — | — | — |
| 2018–19 | Toronto Marlies | AHL | 1 | 0 | 0 | 0 | 0 | — | — | — | — | — |
| 2018–19 | Newfoundland Growlers | ECHL | 11 | 0 | 9 | 9 | 2 | — | — | — | — | — |
| 2018–19 | Providence Bruins | AHL | 35 | 3 | 15 | 18 | 12 | 3 | 0 | 1 | 1 | 0 |
| 2019–20 | Binghamton Devils | AHL | 34 | 3 | 12 | 15 | 6 | — | — | — | — | — |
| 2020–21 | Düsseldorfer EG | DEL | 37 | 1 | 15 | 16 | 10 | — | — | — | — | — |
| 2021–22 | Düsseldorfer EG | DEL | 53 | 3 | 21 | 24 | 14 | 2 | 1 | 1 | 2 | 0 |
| 2022–23 | Düsseldorfer EG | DEL | 2 | 0 | 0 | 0 | 2 | — | — | — | — | — |
| 2023–24 | Düsseldorfer EG | DEL | 18 | 7 | 9 | 16 | 6 | — | — | — | — | — |
| 2024–25 | Düsseldorfer EG | DEL | 52 | 4 | 23 | 27 | 8 | — | — | — | — | — |
| NHL totals | | | 139 | 9 | 26 | 35 | 48 | 15 | 1 | 1 | 2 | 2 |

=== International ===
| Year | Team | Event | Result | GP | G | A | Pts | PIM |
|---|---|---|---|---|---|---|---|---|
| 2010 | Canada | WC | 7th | 7 | 0 | 3 | 3 | 0 |
| Senior totals | | | | 7 | 0 | 3 | 3 | 0 |

== Awards and honours ==
| Award | Year |
|---|---|
CHL
| Memorial Cup (Kelowna Rockets) | 2004 |
AHL
| All-Star Game | 2009 |
NHL
| Stanley Cup (Chicago Blackhawks) | 2015 |
