= Michael Leigh =

Michael Leigh may refer to:

- Mike Leigh (born 1943), British writer; film/stage director
- Dr Michael Leigh, Director General, Enlargement, European Commission, Brussels, see 2012 New Year Honours
- Mike Leigh (sailor) (born 1984), Canadian sailor
- Mickey Leigh (born 1954), member of Harry Slash & The Slashtones

== See also ==
- Michael Lee (disambiguation)
