= Luke Witkowski =

American professional ice hockey player (born 1990)

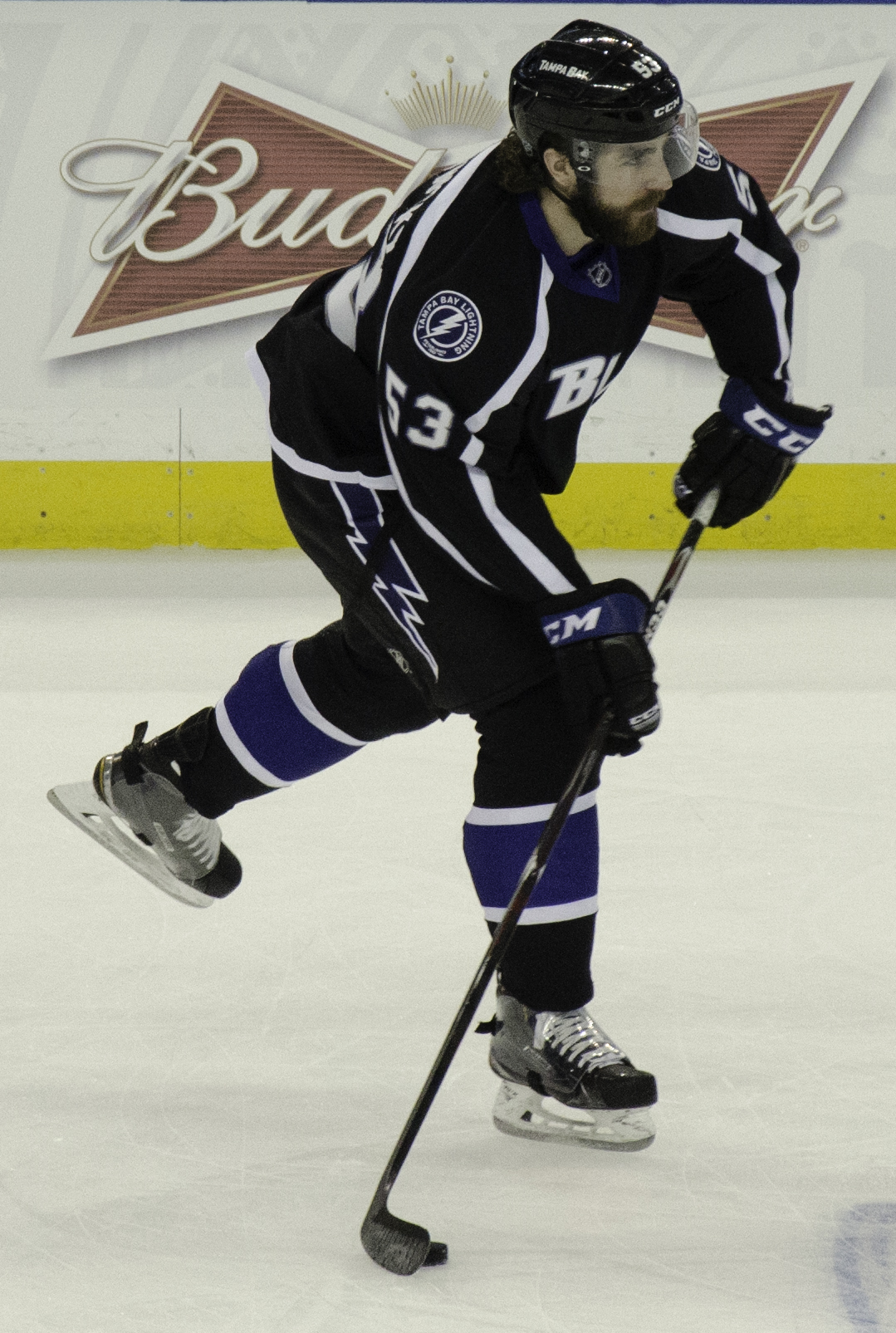
- Witkowski with the Tampa Bay Lightning in 2015
- Born: April 14, 1990 (age 36) Holland, Michigan, U.S.
- Height: 6 ft 2 in (188 cm)
- Weight: 200 lb (91 kg; 14 st 4 lb)
- Position: Defense/right wing
- Shoots: Right
- SHL team Former teams: Brynäs IF; Tampa Bay Lightning; Detroit Red Wings; Tappara; Skellefteå AIK
- NHL draft: 160th overall, 2008; Tampa Bay Lightning
- Playing career: 2012–present

Luke Witkowski (born April 14, 1990) is an American professional ice hockey player who is a defenseman for Brynäs IF of the Swedish Hockey League (SHL). He has previously played in the NHL for the Tampa Bay Lightning and the Detroit Red Wings. Witkowski was selected by the Lightning, 160th overall, in the 2008 NHL entry draft.

== Playing career ==
=== Juniors ===
Witkowski was selected by the Texas Tornado in the 2007 North American Hockey League draft, but played in the United States Hockey League (USHL) for the Fargo Force. He was drafted by the Tampa Bay Lightning in the 2008 NHL entry draft. Witkowski played college ice hockey for Western Michigan University . As captain at Western Michigan in his senior year, he was named to All-CCHA Second Team with two goals and 10 points. Witkowski played in 152 games over four years at Western Michigan. On April 1, 2013, the Tampa Bay Lightning announced signed Witkowski to a two-year, entry-level contract.

=== Professional ===
==== Tampa Bay Lightning ====
On October 19, 2014, the Tampa Bay Lightning recalled Witkowski from the Syracuse Crunch, Tampa Bay's American Hockey League (AHL) affiliate. He has played in four games for the Crunch prior to the recall, recording an assist and 15 penalty minutes. In his first professional season, he appeared in 76 games with the Crunch. During the 2013–14 season, he recorded two goals and 12 points with 204 penalty minutes. During the preseason with the Lightning, he had an assist and 11 penalty minutes. On October 23, the Lightning reassigned Witkowski back to the Crunch. During his brief stint with the Lightning, he did not appear in any games with the team.

On January 16, 2015, the Lightning recalled Witkowski from the Syracuse Crunch. He had appeared in 36 games with the Crunch at that point during the season, posting a goal and six points to go along with 75 penalty minutes. On January 20, Witkowski made his NHL debut in a 4–1 victory over the visiting Vancouver Canucks. In his NHL debut, Witkowski had 14:29 of ice time on the night. On April 14, Witkowsi was reassigned to the Syracuse Crunch. He was expected to help them finish out the regular season and during their playoff run. Witkowski played in 16 games in two stints with the Lightning during the 2014–15 NHL season, where his physical play helped the team through a series of injuries on defense. In the season finale, Witkowski had a team-high eight hits in a Lightning 3–2 shootout win over the Boston Bruins.

On July 17, 2015, the Lightning re-signed Witkowski to a one-year, two-way contract. Witkowski played in 16 games with the Lightning during the 2014–15 season, recording 15 penalty minutes. He had 37 hits and blocked 20 shots during his 16-game stint with the team. Witkowski skated in 50 games with the Crunch that season, collecting two goals and eight points along with 91 penalty minutes. He also skated in three Calder Cup playoff games with Syracuse in 2015, posting one assist and four penalty minutes.

On May 6, 2016, Wikowski played in his first career NHL playoff game, which was a 2–1 win over the New York Islanders. On June 24, the Lightning re-signed Witkowski to a one-year, two-way contract. During the 2015–16 season, Witkowski played in four regular season games with the team. Witkowski also made his Stanley Cup playoffs debut, where he appeared in two games during the second round against the New York Islanders. Witkowski has played in 20 career NHL games, all with the Lightning over the past two seasons. He has also played in 199 career games in the AHL, all with the Crunch.

On October 20, 2016, Witkowski was named as the captain of the Syracuse Crunch. He was the 15th full-time captain in team history and only the second in the Crunch's five seasons of affiliation with the Lightning. Witkowski would start his fourth season with the Crunch, and had previously been a captain for two years at Western Michigan and one with the Fargo Force of the USHL. On December 8, Witkowski recorded his first career NHL assist and point. During the 2016–17 season, Witkowski played a career-high 34 NHL games for the Lightning, recording four assists, 24 shots on goal, 81 hits and 21 blocked shots.

==== Detroit Red Wings ====
On July 1, 2017, Witkowski signed a two-year contract with the Detroit Red Wings.

On November 15, Witkowski was suspended 10 games by the NHL for returning to the ice to take part in an altercation after being escorted off by an official. On February 17, 2018, Witkowski scored his first career NHL goal in a 3–1 win against the Nashville Predators.

==== Return to Tampa ====
On July 1, 2019, having left the Red Wings as a free agent, Witkowski returned to his former club, the Tampa Bay Lightning in signing a two-year, two-way contract. He was named the Crunch's captain for the second time on December 5. Witkowski was one of the eight players called up to the Lightning for their training camp prior to the 2020 Stanley Cup playoffs.

Witkowski spent the entirety of the 2020–21 season in the AHL with Syracuse before suffering a season-ending shoulder injury.

==== Return to Detroit ====
On July 29, 2021, Witkowski returned for a second stint with the Detroit Red Wings, agreeing to a two-year, two-way contract.

==== St. Louis Blues ====
On March 21, 2022, he was traded to the St. Louis Blues, along with Nick Leddy, in exchange for Oskar Sundqvist, Jake Walman and a 2023 second-round pick.

==== Tappara ====
At the conclusion of his contract with the Blues, Witkowski left the club as a free agent. After 10 full professional seasons in North America, Wiktkowski opted to pursue a European career by signing an initial one-year contract with Finnish club, Tappara of the Liiga, on September 21, 2023.

== Career statistics ==
			Regular season					Playoffs
Season	Team	League	GP	G	A	Pts	PIM	GP	G	A	Pts	PIM
2007–08	Ohio Junior Blue Jackets	USHL	58	3	10	13	139	—	—	—	—	—
2008–09	Fargo Force	USHL	55	6	16	22	118	10	2	1	3	29
2009–10	Western Michigan University	CCHA	32	2	4	6	67	—	—	—	—	—
2010–11	Western Michigan University	CCHA	42	1	8	9	56	—	—	—	—	—
2011–12	Western Michigan University	CCHA	40	2	11	13	66	—	—	—	—	—
2012–13	Western Michigan University	CCHA	38	2	8	10	46	—	—	—	—	—
2012–13	Syracuse Crunch	AHL	3	0	0	0	4	—	—	—	—	—
2013–14	Syracuse Crunch	AHL	76	2	10	12	204	—	—	—	—	—
2014–15	Syracuse Crunch	AHL	50	2	6	8	91	3	0	1	1	4
2014–15	Tampa Bay Lightning	NHL	16	0	0	0	15	—	—	—	—	—
2015–16	Syracuse Crunch	AHL	70	3	11	14	166	—	—	—	—	—
2015–16	Tampa Bay Lightning	NHL	4	0	0	0	4	2	0	0	0	0
2016–17	Syracuse Crunch	AHL	19	0	5	5	59	—	—	—	—	—
2016–17	Tampa Bay Lightning	NHL	34	0	4	4	39	—	—	—	—	—
2017–18	Detroit Red Wings	NHL	31	1	3	4	68	—	—	—	—	—
2018–19	Detroit Red Wings	NHL	34	0	2	2	23	—	—	—	—	—
2019–20	Tampa Bay Lightning	NHL	12	1	2	3	13	—	—	—	—	—
2019–20	Syracuse Crunch	AHL	29	2	4	6	63	—	—	—	—	—
2020–21	Syracuse Crunch	AHL	14	0	2	2	32	—	—	—	—	—
2021–22	Grand Rapids Griffins	AHL	44	3	4	7	62	—	—	—	—	—
2021–22	Detroit Red Wings	NHL	1	0	0	0	0	—	—	—	—	—
2021–22	Springfield Thunderbirds	AHL	16	2	2	4	23	17	1	1	2	14
2022–23	Springfield Thunderbirds	AHL	28	0	3	3	26	—	—	—	—	—
NHL totals			132	2	11	13	162	2	0	0	0	0
