= All I Need =

All I Need may refer to:

== Music ==
=== Albums ===
- All I Need (Foxes album) or the title song, 2016
- All I Need (Jack Wagner album) or the title song (see below), 1984
- All I Need (Sylvester album) or the title song, 1982
- All I Need (Margaret EP) or the title song, 2013
- All I Need (Mike Lee EP) or the title song, 2015
- All I Need, by the Forester Sisters, 1989

=== Songs ===
- "All I Need" (Air song), 1998
- "All I Need" (Dan Hartman song), 1981
- "All I Need" (Jack Wagner song), 1984
- "All I Need" (Jake Bugg song), 2020
- "All I Need" (Jesse Powell song), 1996
- "All I Need" (Matchbox Twenty song), 2004
- "All I Need" (Radiohead song), 2009
- "All I Need" (Sterling Simms song), 2008
- "All I Need" (The Temptations song), 1967
- "All I Need" (Within Temptation song), 2007
- "All I Need", by Aaliyah from I Care 4 U, 2002
- "All I Need", by Alexandra Burke from The Truth Is, 2018
- "All I Need", by Awolnation from Megalithic Symphony, 2011
- "All I Need", by Bethany Dillon from Bethany Dillon, 2004
- "All I Need", by Christina Aguilera from Bionic, 2010
- "All I Need", by Dimitri Vegas & Like Mike, 2018
- "All I Need", by Fat Joe from Loyalty, 2002
- "All I Need", by Gabbi Garcia, 2017
- "All I Need", by the Game from Stop Snitchin, Stop Lyin, 2005
- "All I Need", by Gemma Hayes from Let It Break, 2011
- "All I Need", by Jay-Z from The Blueprint, 2001
- "All I Need", by Jacob Collier from Djesse Vol. 3, 2020
- "All I Need", by Joakim Lundell, 2017
- "All I Need", by Level 42 from Retroglide, 2006
- "All I Need", by Live from Songs from Black Mountain, 2006
- "All I Need", by Mat Kearney from Nothing Left to Lose, 2006
- "All I Need", by Method Man from Tical, 1994
- "All I Need", by Montell Jordan from More..., 1996
- "All I Need", by My Bloody Valentine from Isn't Anything, 1988
- "All I Need", by Natasha Bedingfield from Strip Me, 2010
- "All I Need", by Popcaan from Fixtape, 2020
- "All I Need", by Sara Groves from The Other Side of Something, 2004
- "All I Need", by Slushii, 2020
- "All I Need", by Stiff Little Fingers from Hope Street, 1999
- "All I Need", by Switchfoot from Native Tongue, 2019
- "All I Need", by Xscape from Traces of My Lipstick, 1998
- "All I Need", by YoungBoy Never Broke Again from Sincerely, Kentrell, 2021
- "All I Need", by Zebrahead from Yellow, 1998
- "All I Need (All I Don't)", by Girls Aloud from Sound of the Underground, 2003
- "All I Need (Is Not to Need You)", by Patty Loveless from Only What I Feel, 1993

== See also ==
- "All That I Need", a song by Boyzone, 1998
- "I'll Be There for You/You're All I Need to Get By", a remixed version of the Method Man song, 1995
- "Say (All I Need)", a song by OneRepublic, 2008
