= Jake Newton (ice hockey) =

American ice hockey player (born 1988)

- Born: September 22, 1988 (age 37) San Jacinto, California, U.S.
- Height: 6 ft 3 in (191 cm)
- Weight: 200 lb (91 kg; 14 st 4 lb)
- Position: Defense
- Shoots: Left
- GET team Former teams: Storhamar; Syracuse Crunch; Lake Erie Monsters; Bridgeport Sound Tigers; HC Gherdëina; Vaasan Sport; Mountfield HK; KooKoo; JYP Jyväskylä; IK Oskarshamn
- NHL draft: Undrafted
- Playing career: 2010–present

Jake Newton (born September 22, 1988) is an American professional ice hockey defenseman. He is currently playing for Storhamar in the Norwegian GET-ligaen.

== Playing career ==
Upon completing his freshman year in 2009–10 with Northeastern University and selected to the Hockey East All-Rookie Team, Newton was signed as an undrafted free-agent to a three-year entry-level contract with the Anaheim Ducks on March 17, 2010. He was traded to the Colorado Avalanche from the Anaheim Ducks along with a conditional draft pick for defenseman Kyle Cumiskey on October 8, 2011. He was then immediately assigned to AHL affiliate, the Lake Erie Monsters before finishing the 2011–12 season with the Avalanche's secondary affiliate, the Allen Americans of the Central Hockey League.

On August 29, 2012, Newton signed as a free agent to his first European contract with a one-year deal with HC Eppan Pirates of the Italian second division Serie A2. During the 2012–13 season, Newton scored an impressive 41 points in 45 games, to help the Pirates win the Championships and was selected as the League's best player.

On July 26, 2013, Newton returned to North America and signed a one-year ECHL contract with the Ontario Reign. During the 2013–14 season he made a return to the AHL when he was loaned to the Bridgeport Sound Tigers for 18 games.

Newton decided to continue his professional career again in Italy, signing a one-year contract with Serie A outfit, HC Gherdëina on August 20, 2014. In the 2014–15 season, Newton excelled as Gherdëina's best player, contributing with 24 goals and 52 points in 39 games to lead the league in both categories in scoring from the blueline. After Gherdëina's elimination in the Quarter-finals, Newton signed a one-year contract with Finnish Liiga club, Sport on March 7, 2015.

In the 2015–16 season, Newton adapted quickly to the pace of the Liiga, contributing to Sports' blueline with 9 goals and 24 points from 58 games in Vaasa. After two seasons abroad, Newton opted to return to North America, securing a one-year deal with ECHL outfit, the Idaho Steelheads, on September 8, 2016. Newton was released from his contract with the Steelheads prior to the season, after agreeing to a one-year deal in the Czech Republic with Mountfield HK on October 4, 2016.

Into the 2018–19 season, Newton continued his playing career in agreeing to terms with the Bayreuth Tigers of the DEL2 on November 5, 2018. He played in 13 games with the Tigers for 10 points, before joining the Thomas Sabo Ice Tigers for the Spengler Cup. On January 2, 2019, Newton opted to return to close out the season in a second stint with JYP of the Liiga.

As a free agent, Newton opted to sign a one-year contract with newly promoted Swedish club, IK Oskarshamn of the SHL, on May 22, 2019.

== Family ==
Newton's older brother Josh played in the ECHL with the San Diego Gulls during the 2005–06 season.

== Career statistics ==
			Regular season					Playoffs
Season	Team	League	GP	G	A	Pts	PIM	GP	G	A	Pts	PIM
2006–07	Texas Tornado	NAHL	61	12	15	27	35	10	2	5	7	2
2007–08	Lincoln Stars	USHL	56	11	14	25	22	8	3	3	6	4
2008–09	Lincoln Stars	USHL	59	10	28	38	22	7	2	2	4	0
2009–10	Northeastern University	HE	34	9	13	22	10	—	—	—	—	—
2010–11	Syracuse Crunch	AHL	48	2	7	9	6	—	—	—	—	—
2011–12	Lake Erie Monsters	AHL	31	1	2	3	8	—	—	—	—	—
2011–12	Allen Americans	CHL	11	1	6	7	15	6	0	2	2	0
2012–13	HC Eppan Pirates	ITL2	45	22	19	41	12	7	4	2	6	2
2013–14	Ontario Reign	ECHL	36	12	17	29	4	4	1	0	1	2
2013–14	Bridgeport Sound Tigers	AHL	18	2	6	8	2	—	—	—	—	—
2014–15	HC Gherdëina	ITL	39	24	28	52	14	2	0	0	0	0
2015–16	Sport	Liiga	58	9	15	24	14	2	0	1	1	2
2016–17	Mountfield HK	ELH	43	5	10	15	12	11	0	1	1	10
2017–18	KooKoo	Liiga	52	12	23	35	10	—	—	—	—	—
2017–18	JYP Jyväskylä	Liiga	8	1	1	2	6	6	1	2	3	0
2018–19	Bayreuth Tigers	DEL2	13	4	6	10	0	—	—	—	—	—
2018–19	JYP Jyväskylä	Liiga	22	7	2	9	8	1	0	0	0	0
2019–20	Storhamar Hockey	GET-ligaen	26	6	10	16	14	—	—	—	—	—
2022	Team Trottier	3ICE	13	5	3	8	—	—	—	—	—	—
2023	Team Fuhr	3ICE	6	4	2	6	—	—	—	—	—	—
AHL totals			97	5	15	20	16	—	—	—	—	—

== Awards and honors ==
Award	Year
USHL
All-Star Game	2008–09
Second All-Star Team	2008–09
College
All-Hockey East Rookie Team	2009–10
3ICE
Patrick Cup Champion	2022
