= Mike Lee (ice hockey, born 1990) =

American ice hockey player (born 1990)

- Born: October 5, 1990 (age 35) Fargo, North Dakota, U.S.
- Height: 6 ft 1 in (185 cm)
- Weight: 194 lb (88 kg; 13 st 12 lb)
- Position: Goaltender
- Caught: Left
- Played for: Portland Pirates
- NHL draft: 91st overall, 2009; Phoenix Coyotes
- Playing career: 2012–2015

Michael Lee (born October 5, 1990) is an American former professional ice hockey player. He played as a goaltender for the Portland Pirates of the American Hockey League (AHL) and the Gwinnett Gladiators of the ECHL. He was selected 91st overall in the third round of the 2009 NHL entry draft by the Phoenix Coyotes. Although born in Fargo, North Dakota, Lee was raised in Roseau, Minnesota.

== Playing career ==
Before beginning his collegiate career at St. Cloud State University, Lee was the starting goaltender for the Fargo Force during the 2008–09 season in the United States Hockey League (USHL). Despite it being the franchise's inaugural season, Lee's steady play and leadership in net were instrumental in helping the expansion team achieve an impressive run to the USHL playoff finals. Before his time in the USHL, Lee had already built a strong hockey résumé in high school, where he backstopped the Roseau Rams to a Minnesota state championship.

Lee was the first American goaltender chosen in the 2009 NHL entry draft. He was also a member of the United States junior team that won the 2010 World Junior Championships. Although he started in the gold medal game, he was replaced by Jack Campbell during the second period. Later, when the Arizona Coyotes traded backup goaltender Devan Dubnyk, Lee was promoted to serve as Mike Smith's backup, marking his first time on an NHL roster. However, before he could appear in a game, he was reassigned in favor of Mike McKenna.

== Awards and honors ==
Medal record

Men's ice hockey

Representing the United States

World Junior Championships
Gold medal – first place	2010 Canada	

World Junior A Challenge
Gold medal – first place	2008 Camrose	

Award	Year	Ref
USHL
All-Rookie Team	2009	
All-Star Game	2009	
Goaltender of the Year	2009	
College
WCHA All-Academic Team	2011, 2012	
ECHL
All-Star Game	2013	
