= All I Need (Mike Lee EP) =

EP by Mike Lee
- Released: June 16, 2015
- Genre: CCM, worship
- Length: 24:29
- Label: Mike Lee
- Producer: Ed Cash, Scott Cash, Cody Norris

Mike Lee chronology
| Awakening Hearts (2014) | All I Need (2015) |

All I Need is the second extended play from Mike Lee. Mike Lee Music released the EP on June 16, 2015. Lee worked with Ed Cash, Scott Cash, and Cody Norris, in the production of this album.

== Critical reception ==
Professional ratings
Review scores
| Source | Rating |
|---|---|
| CCM Magazine | 4/5 stars |
| Cross Rhythms | 8/10 squares |
| Louder Than the Music | 4.5/5 stars |
| New Release Today | 3/5 stars |
| Worship Leader | 4/5 stars |

Awarding the EP four stars from CCM Magazine, Andy Argyrakis states, "Mike Lee makes another artistic and spiritual leap forward on this impressive EP". Amanda Furbeck, giving the EP four stars at Worship Leader, writes, "All I Need lends itself well to personal times of devotion". Rating the EP an eight out of ten for Cross Rhythms, Stephen Curry says, "Lee has a habit of coming up with singable lines". Jonathan J. Francesco, signaling in a three star review by New Release Today, describes, "Mike Lee has crafted a deeply personal and relevant EP. Filled with honest reflections, powerful worship, and effective music...it's a success on many fronts, and it is a commendable achievement". Indicating in a four and a half star review from Louder Than the Music, Jono Davies replies, "The word that keeps coming to mind with this release is beauty."

== Track list ==
Track list
| No. | Title | Length |
|---|---|---|
| 1. | "Awaken Me" | 4:10 |
| 2. | "Different (Acoustic Version)" | 5:04 |
| 3. | "Come On Come On" | 3:24 |
| 4. | "All I Need" | 3:37 |
| 5. | "Freedom" | 2:03 |
| 6. | "I'll Be Least" | 4:41 |
| 7. | "Reprise" | 1:30 |
| Total length: | | 24:29 |
