= Mike Lee (musician) =

American musician, and guitarist (born 1988)

- Birth name: Michael Gregory Lee
- Born: March 18, 1988 (age 37)
- Origin: Fort Wayne, Indiana
- Genres: Pop contemporary Worship music
- Occupation(s): Singer, songwriter
- Instrument(s): Vocals, singer-songwriter, guitar
- Years active: 2012–present
- Labels: independent
- Website: mikeleemusic.com

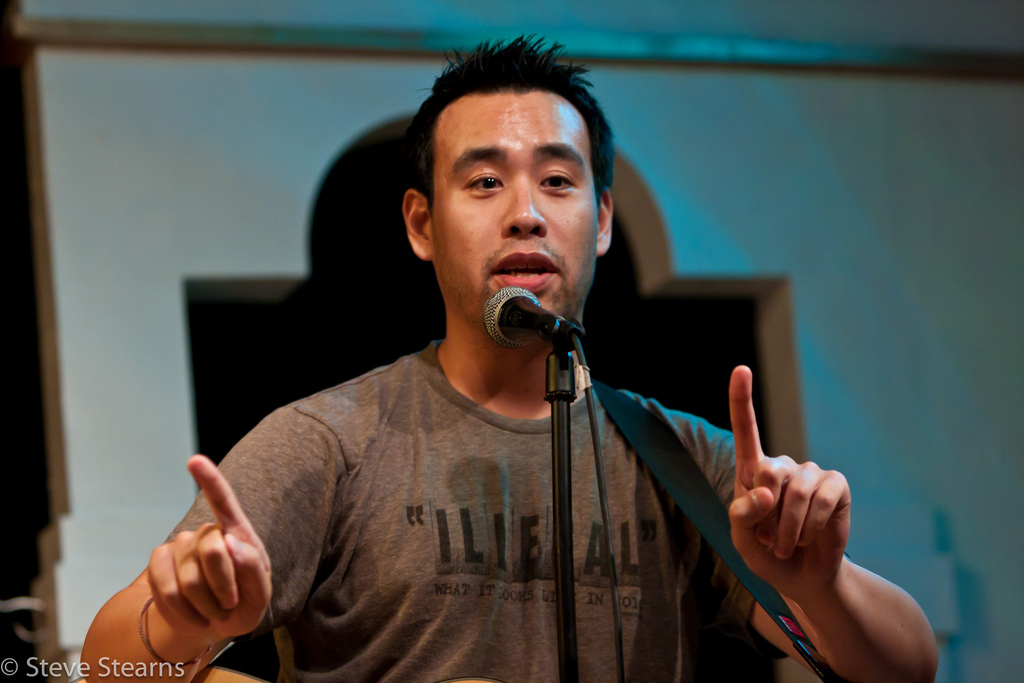
Mike Lee in 2010

Michael Gregory Lee (born March 18, 1988) is an American musician, and guitarist, who primarily plays a Pop and contemporary Worship music style of music. He has released two extended plays, Awakening Hearts in 2014 and All I Need in 2015, both independently released. In 2017 he released an 11 track LP Worth It (Mike Lee LP).

== Early life ==
Mike was born on March 18, 1988, into a musical family. He started writing songs at fourteen years old, on an acoustic guitar. He was raised in Fort Wayne, Indiana, where he would eventually become the worship pastor at Liquid Church.

== Music career ==
His music recording career began in 2012, with the recording sessions done by Ed Cash and Scott Cash, and this led to his first extended play, Awakening Hearts, which was released independently on February 11, 2014. The subsequent extended play, All I Need, was released independently on June 16, 2015. His second extended play was reviewed by CCM Magazine, Worship Leader, Cross Rhythms, New Release Today, and Louder Than the Music.

== Personal life ==
Mike Lee married Michelle (née Carlisle), who both reside in Fort Wayne, Indiana, with their sons, Preston and Stetson.

== Discography ==
- Awakening Hearts (February 11, 2014)
- All I Need (June 16, 2015)
- Worth It (July 22, 2017)
