= Lavender Cheung =

Hong Kong television presenter

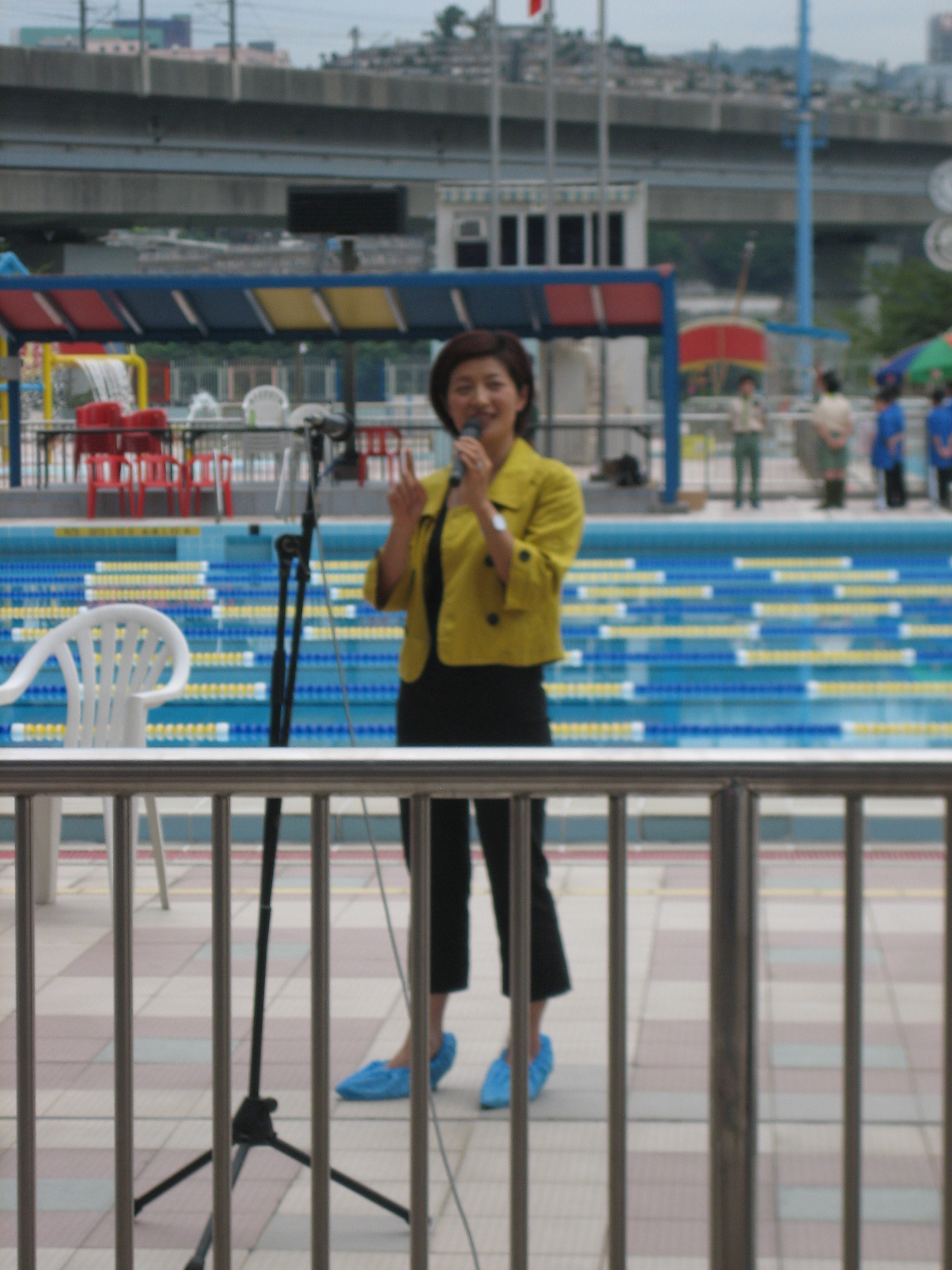
Lavender Cheung.JPG

Lavender Cheung (張宏艷) (born 1970 in Beijing, China) is a former news anchor of Cable TV Hong Kong of Hong Kong. Cheung graduated from The Chinese University of Hong Kong and she received Monbusho Scholarship from Japanese Government in 1995. She then attended Keio University in Japan for a master's degree in Law, majored in Political Studies.

Cheung joined Cable News Hong Kong in 1993 and left in 1995 to complete her studies in Japan. During her stay in Japan, she worked as Japanese Correspondent for Cable TV. She returned to Cable TV in 1998 and was promoted to Senior Anchor and then Chief Anchor in i-Cable News. She resigned from Cable TV in 2009 and changed to work as corporate promotion in the Hong Kong General Chamber of Commerce. After a subsequent stint at the Hong Kong Hospital Authority, she returned to the Chinese University of Hong Kong to take up the position of Director of Communications and Public Relations.

== Career in CUHK ==
During the 2019 Chinese University of Hong Kong conflict, Cheung once represented the students and staff negotiating with the Hong Kong Police. Agreement was once reached, but it was nevertheless overthrown by the police.
