= Michael Forney =

American ice hockey player (born 1988)

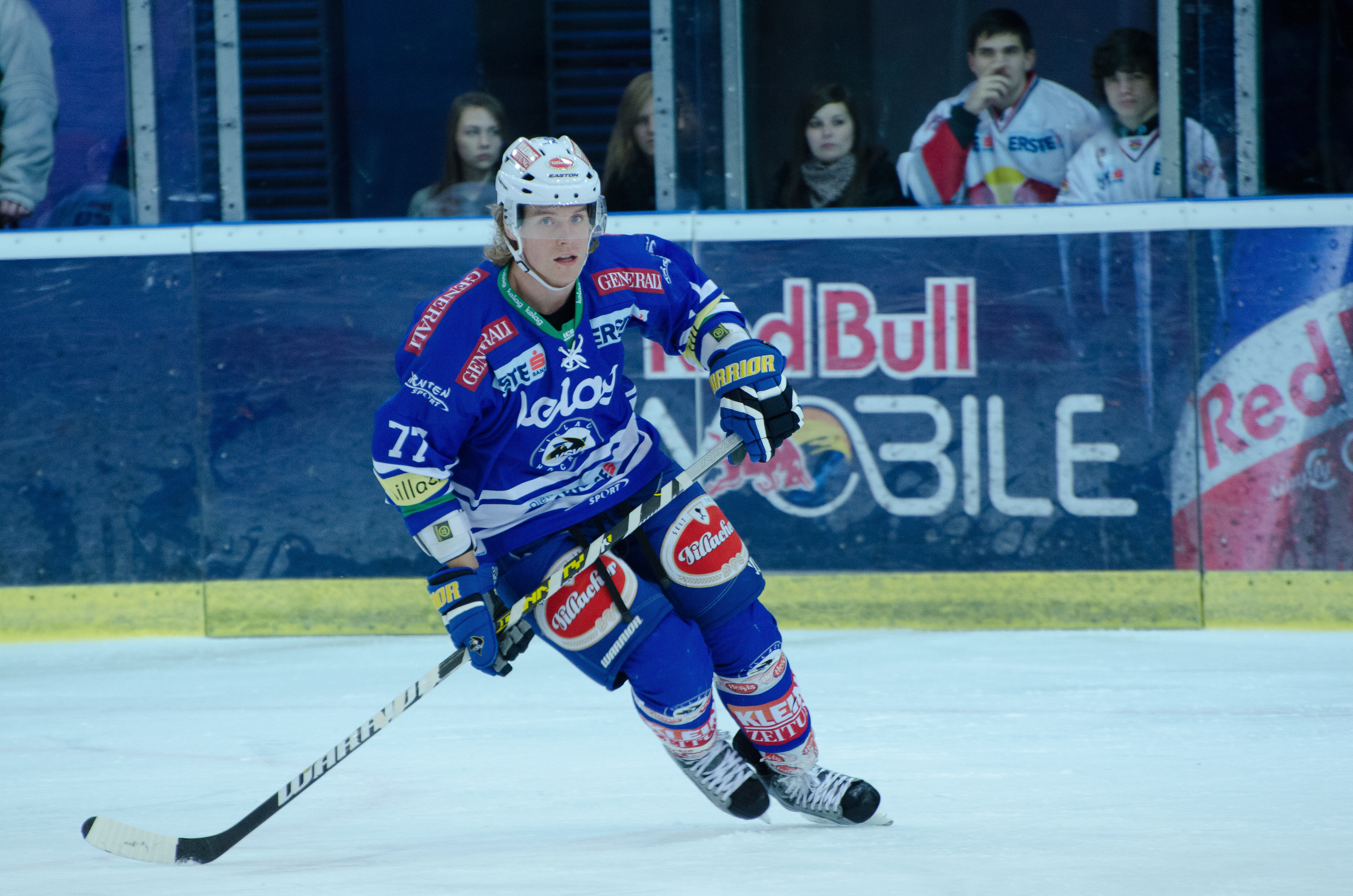
- Born: May 14, 1988 (age 37) Thief River Falls, Minnesota, U.S.
- Height: 6 ft 2 in (188 cm)
- Weight: 185 lb (84 kg; 13 st 3 lb)
- Position: Left wing
- Shot: Right
- Played for: Chicago Wolves; St. John's IceCaps; Texas Stars; EC VSV; Sparta Warriors; Sheffield Steelers; Belfast Giants
- NHL draft: 80th overall, 2006; Atlanta Thrashers
- Playing career: 2009–2017

Michael Forney (born May 14, 1988) is an American former professional ice hockey player. He last played with the Belfast Giants in the Elite Ice Hockey League (EIHL). Forney was drafted 80th overall by the Atlanta Thrashers in the 2006 NHL entry draft.

== Playing career ==
Forney played in the 2010–11 ECHL All-Star Game. Without an extension offered from his entry-level contract with the Winnipeg Jets. Forney returned to the Eagles on a full-time basis, signing a one-year deal on August 16, 2012.

In the 2012–13 season, Forney led the Eagles in scoring, finishing second in the league, with 79 points in 71 games. He was rewarded with a selection to the ECHL First All-Star Team. A free agent, with the intention of keeping in shape, Forney went on a working holiday of sorts, signing a short-term contract with the Perth Thunder of the Australian Ice Hockey League. In only 16 games with the Thunder, Forney scored an impressive 47 points, before leaving in preparation to join his new Austrian club, EC VSV, on a one-year contract for the 2013–14 season.

After a spell with Sheffield Steelers, Forney signed for EIHL counterparts Belfast Giants in 2015. Following two seasons in Northern Ireland, Forney announced his return to his native Minnesota in April 2017.

== Career statistics ==
=== Regular season and playoffs ===
			Regular season					Playoffs
Season	Team	League	GP	G	A	Pts	PIM	GP	G	A	Pts	PIM
2002–03	Thief River Falls High School	HSMN	28	4	10	14		—	—	—	—	—
2003–04	Thief River Falls High School	HSMN	24	14	22	36		—	—	—	—	—
2004–05	Thief River Falls High School	HSMN	28	34	33	67		—	—	—	—	—
2005–06	Thief River Falls High School	HSMN	21	23	37	60	28	—	—	—	—	—
2005–06	Des Moines Buccaneers	USHL	3	0	0	0	0	—	—	—	—	—
2005–06	US NTDP U18	USDP	4	1	0	1	0	—	—	—	—	—
2006–07	University of North Dakota	WCHA	16	0	2	2	10	—	—	—	—	—
2007–08	University of North Dakota	WCHA	3	0	0	0	2	—	—	—	—	—
2008–09	Green Bay Gamblers	USHL	59	26	34	60	53	7	3	7	10	2
2009–10	Gwinnett Gladiators	ECHL	63	11	15	26	66	—	—	—	—	—
2009–10	Chicago Wolves	AHL	3	0	0	0	0	—	—	—	—	—
2010–11	Chicago Wolves	AHL	9	0	2	2	0	—	—	—	—	—
2010–11	Gwinnett Gladiators	ECHL	66	21	45	66	79	—	—	—	—	—
2011–12	Colorado Eagles	ECHL	52	20	31	51	57	1	0	1	1	0
2011–12	St. John's IceCaps	AHL	3	0	0	0	0	—	—	—	—	—
2011–12	Texas Stars	AHL	11	1	1	2	2	—	—	—	—	—
2012–13	Colorado Eagles	ECHL	71	35	44	79	110	6	1	3	4	4
2012–13	Perth Thunder	AUS	16	11	36	47	12	—	—	—	—	—
2013–14	EC VSV	AUT	35	10	11	21	28	—	—	—	—	—
2013–14	Sparta Warriors	NOR	10	5	6	11	2	5	0	3	3	6
2013–14	Arizona Sundogs	CHL	3	1	3	4	2	10	3	6	9	14
2014–15	Sheffield Steelers	EIHL	52	33	34	67	63	4	1	2	3	0
2015–16	Belfast Giants	EIHL	52	20	28	48	43	2	1	1	2	0
2016–17	Belfast Giants	EIHL	49	15	23	38	36	3	0	2	2	0
AHL totals			26	1	3	4	2	—	—	—	—	—
ECHL totals			253	87	135	222	312	7	1	4	5	4
EIHL totals			153	68	85	153	142	9	2	5	7	0

=== International ===
Year	Team	Event	GP	G	A	Pts	PIM
2005	United States	U18	5	5	3	8	4
Junior totals			5	5	3	8	4

== Awards and honours ==
Award	Year
ECHL
First All-Star Team	2012–13
