= Everything I Have Is Yours (album) =

Compilation album by Billy Eckstine
- Released: March 7, 1991
- Recorded: May 20, 1947 – April 26, 1957
- Length: 2:12:58
- Label: Verve
- Producer: Bob Porter; Richard Seidel

Everything I Have Is Yours is a 1991 compilation album of songs by Billy Eckstine, subtitled "The Best of the M-G-M Years". It was released by Verve Records as a double LP.

== Reception ==
Professional ratings
Review scores
Source	Rating
AllMusic	5/5 stars
The Encyclopedia of Popular Music	4/5 stars

The editors of AllMusic awarded the album a full five stars, and Scott Yanow wrote: "Although not as essential from the jazz standpoint as Billy Eckstine's earlier big-band dates, this two-fer features the singer at the peak of his powers."

Max Morath, author of The NPR Curious Listener's Guide to Popular Standards, listed the album as among "Billy's Best," calling it "fine."

== Track listing ==
Disc One
No.	Title	Writer(s)	Length
1.	"Everything I Have Is Yours"	Harold Adamson, Burton Lane	3:13
2.	"Fools Rush In (Where Angels Fear to Tread)"	Rube Bloom, Johnny Mercer	2:59
3.	"Blue Moon"	Lorenz Hart, Richard Rodgers	3:11
4.	"Mr. B's Blues"	Billy Eckstine	2:28
5.	"Temptation"	Nacio Herb Brown, Arthur Freed	2:54
6.	"Somehow"	Mort Maser	3:13
7.	"Caravan"	Duke Ellington, Irving Mills, Juan Tizol	2:50
8.	"Bewildered"	Teddy Powell, Leonard Whitcup	3:13
9.	"Body and Soul"	Frank Eyton, Johnny Green, Edward Heyman, Robert Sour	2:54
10.	"My Foolish Heart"	Ned Washington, Victor Young	3:03
11.	"Ev'ryday (I Fall In Love)"	Sammy Fain, Irving Kahal	2:57
12.	"I Love You"	Cole Porter	2:39
13.	"Dedicated to You"	Sammy Cahn, Saul Chaplin, Hy Zaret	2:44
14.	"You're All I Need"	Walter Jurmann, Gus Kahn, Bronislaw Kaper	3:05
15.	"I Wanna Be Loved"	Johnny Green, Edward Heyman, Billy Rose	2:56
16.	"You've Got Me Crying Again"	Isham Jones, Charles Newman	3:28
17.	"I've Never Been In Love Before"	Frank Loesser	3:01
18.	"I Apologize""	Al Goodhart, Al Hoffman, Ed G. Nelson	2:52
19.	"As Long As I Live"	Harold Arlen, Ted Koehler	2:48
20.	"I Left My Hat In Haiti"	Burton Lane, Alan Jay Lerner	2:41

Disc Two
No.	Title	Writer(s)	Length
1.	"Here Comes the Blues"	Wynonie Harris, Illinois Jacquet	3:09
2.	"Life Is Just a Bowl of Cherries"	Lew Brown, Ray Henderson	2:43
3.	"Wonder Why"	Nicholas Brodszky, Sammy Cahn	2:53
4.	"I'm a Fool to Want You"	Joel Herron, Frank Sinatra, Jack Wolf	3:07
5.	"Taking a Chance on Love"	Vernon Duke, Ted Fetter, John Latouche	2:38
6.	"You're Driving Me Crazy"	Walter Donaldson	3:08
7.	"Early Autumn"	Ralph Burns, Woody Herman, Johnny Mercer	3:18
8.	"Tenderly"	Walter Gross, Jack Lawrence	3:42
9.	"One for My Baby (And One More for the Road)"	Harold Arlen, Johnny Mercer	3:37
10.	"If You Could See Me Now"	Tadd Dameron, Carl Sigman	3:24
11.	"Smoke Gets In Your Eyes"	Otto Harbach, Jerome Kern	3:42
12.	"Laura"	Johnny Mercer, David Raksin	3:16
13.	"Mister You've Gone And Got the Blues"	Billy Eckstine, Bob Russell	3:31
14.	"Ill Wind (You're Blowin' Me No Good)"	Harold Arlen, Ted Koehler	3:38
15.	"April in Paris"	Vernon Duke, Yip Harburg	3:06
16.	"Coquette"	Johnny Green, Gus Kahn, Carmen Lombardo	3:07
17.	"Send My Baby Back to Me"	Milton Delugg, Bob Hilliard	2:56
18.	"How High the Moon"	Nancy Hamilton, Morgan Lewis	5:20
19.	"St. Louis Blues"	W.C. Handy	6:18
20.	"Don't Get Around Much Anymore"	Duke Ellington, Bob Russell	2:31
21.	"Lost in Loveliness"	Leo Robin, Sigmund Romberg	2:57
22.	"Passing Strangers"	Barry Mann, Rita Mann, Sidney Mitchell	2:38
