= List of Tampa Bay Lightning players =

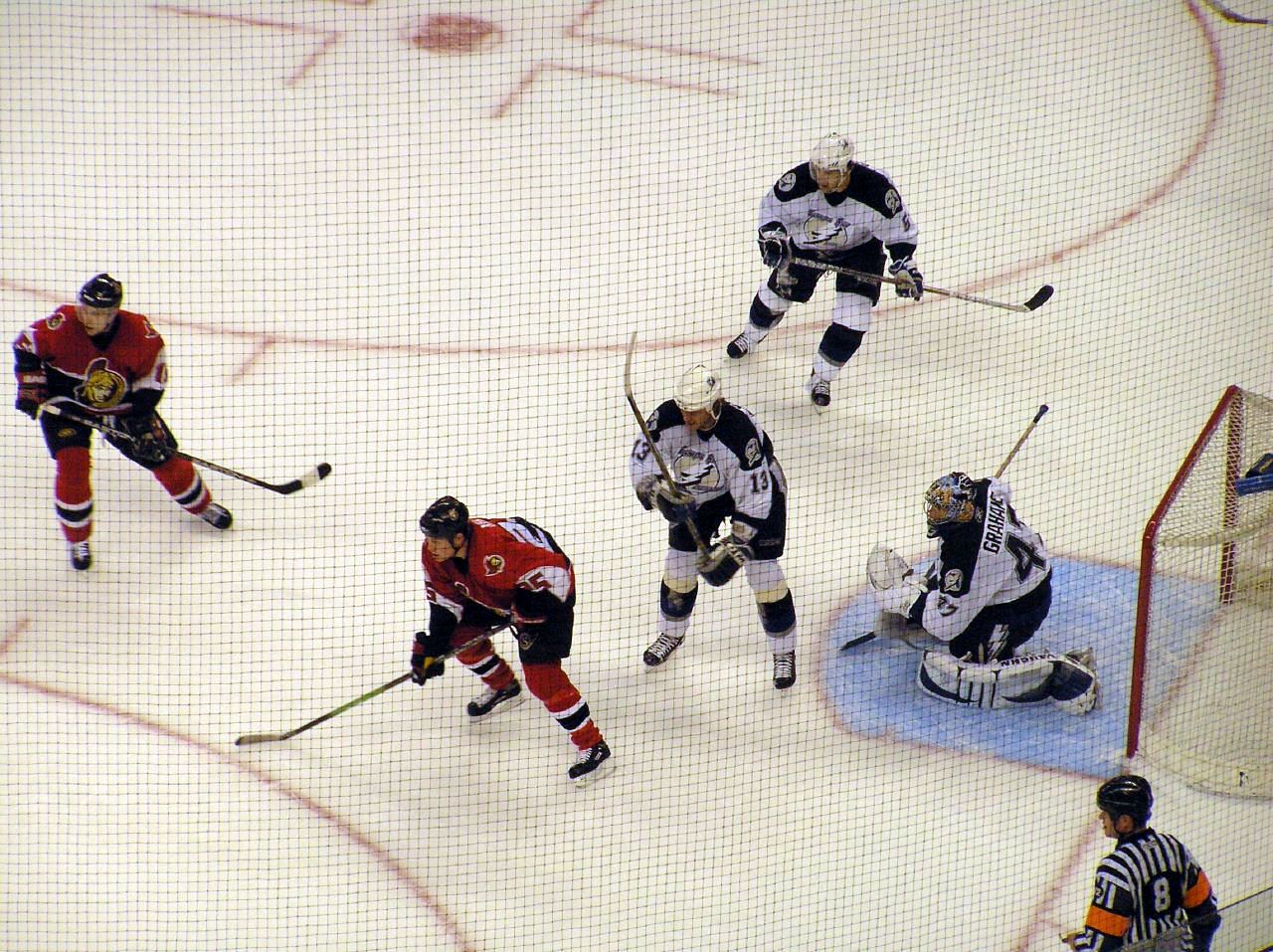
Tampa playing the Ottawa Senators during the 2006 Stanley Cup Playoffs.

This is a complete list of ice hockey players who have played for the Tampa Bay Lightning in the National Hockey League (NHL). It includes players that have played at least one regular season or playoff game for the Tampa Bay Lightning since the franchise was established in 1992. Founded in 1992 as an expansion team along with the Ottawa Senators, 478 different players have played with the Lightning. The Lightning have won three Stanley Cup championships: 2004, 2020, and 2021. They also reached the Stanley Cup Finals in 2015 and in 2022. The Lightning have had five players, Dave Andreychuk, Dino Ciccarelli, Mark Recchi, Denis Savard, and Martin St. Louis, inducted into the Hockey Hall of Fame.

As of May 4, 2026, 54 goaltenders and 424 skaters (forwards and defensemen) have appeared in at least one regular-season or playoff game with the Tampa Bay Lightning since the team joined the league in the 1992–93 NHL season. The 478 all-time members of the Lightning are listed below, with statistics complete through the end of the 2025–26 season.

== Key ==
- † Stanley Cup winner, Hockey Hall of Famer, or retired number.
- * Appeared in a Lightning game during the 2025–26 season.

Abbreviations
Nat	Nationality
GP	Games played
SC	Stanley Cup winner
HHOF	Hockey Hall of Fame inductee

Goaltenders
W	Wins	SO	Shutouts
L	Losses	GAA	Goals against average
T	Ties	SV%	Save percentage
OTL	Overtime loss		

Skaters
Pos	Position	RW	Right wing	A	Assists
D	Defenseman	C	Centre	P	Points
LW	Left wing	G	Goals	PIM	Penalty minutes

The "Seasons" column lists the first year of the season of the player's first game and the last year of the season of the player's last game. For example, a player who played one game in the 2000–2001 season would be listed as playing with the team from 2000–2001, regardless of what calendar year the game occurred within.

Statistics complete as of the 2025–2026 NHL season.

== Goaltenders ==
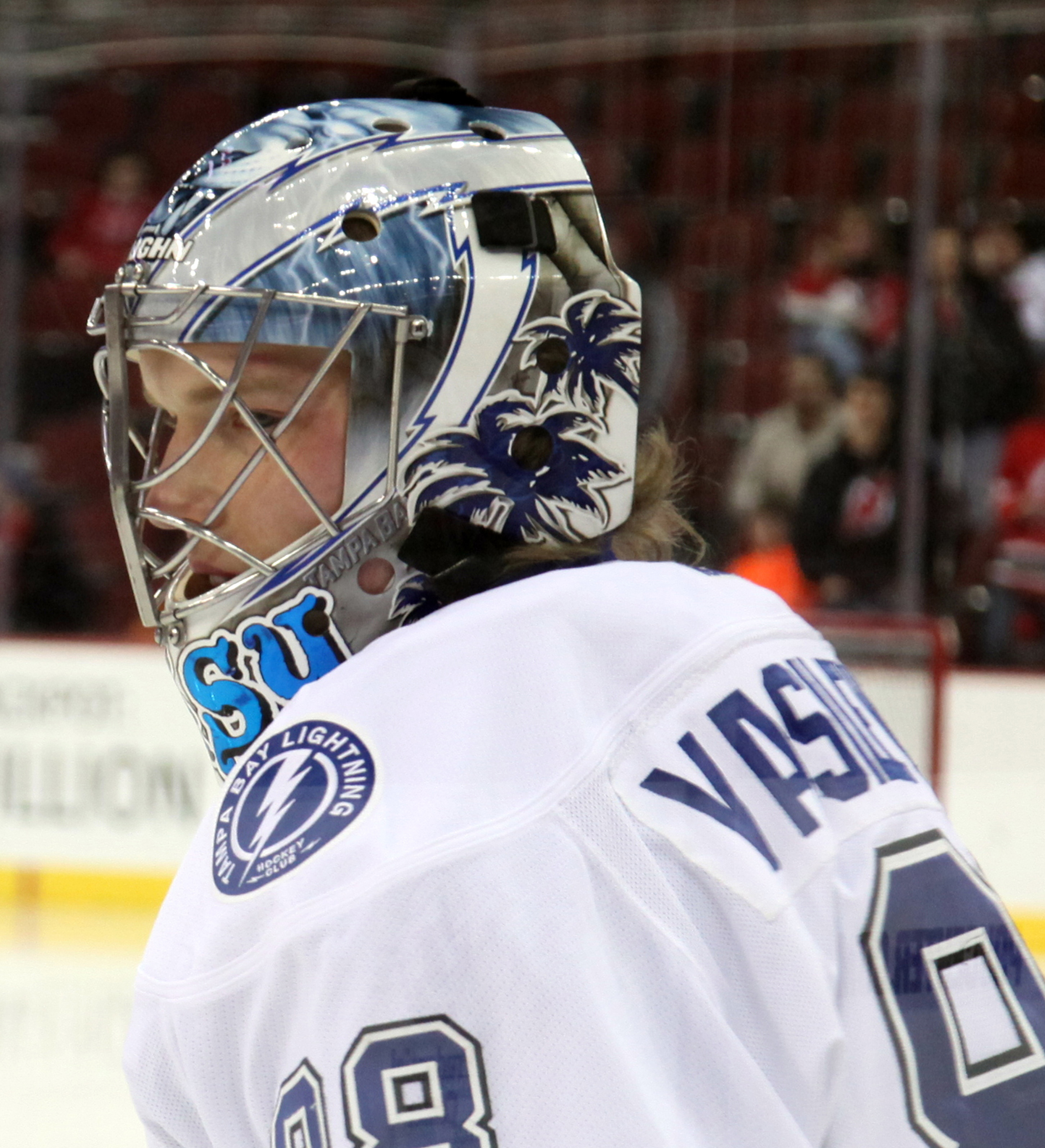
The 19th overall pick in 2012, Andrei Vasilevskiy has won the Conn Smythe Trophy, Vezina Trophy (2x) and the Stanley Cup (2x). Vasilevskiy is the Lightning all-time leader for goalie games played (598), wins (370), shutouts (42), shots against (17589), and saves (16122). Vasilevskiy holds the single season record for most shutouts (8) and wins (44).

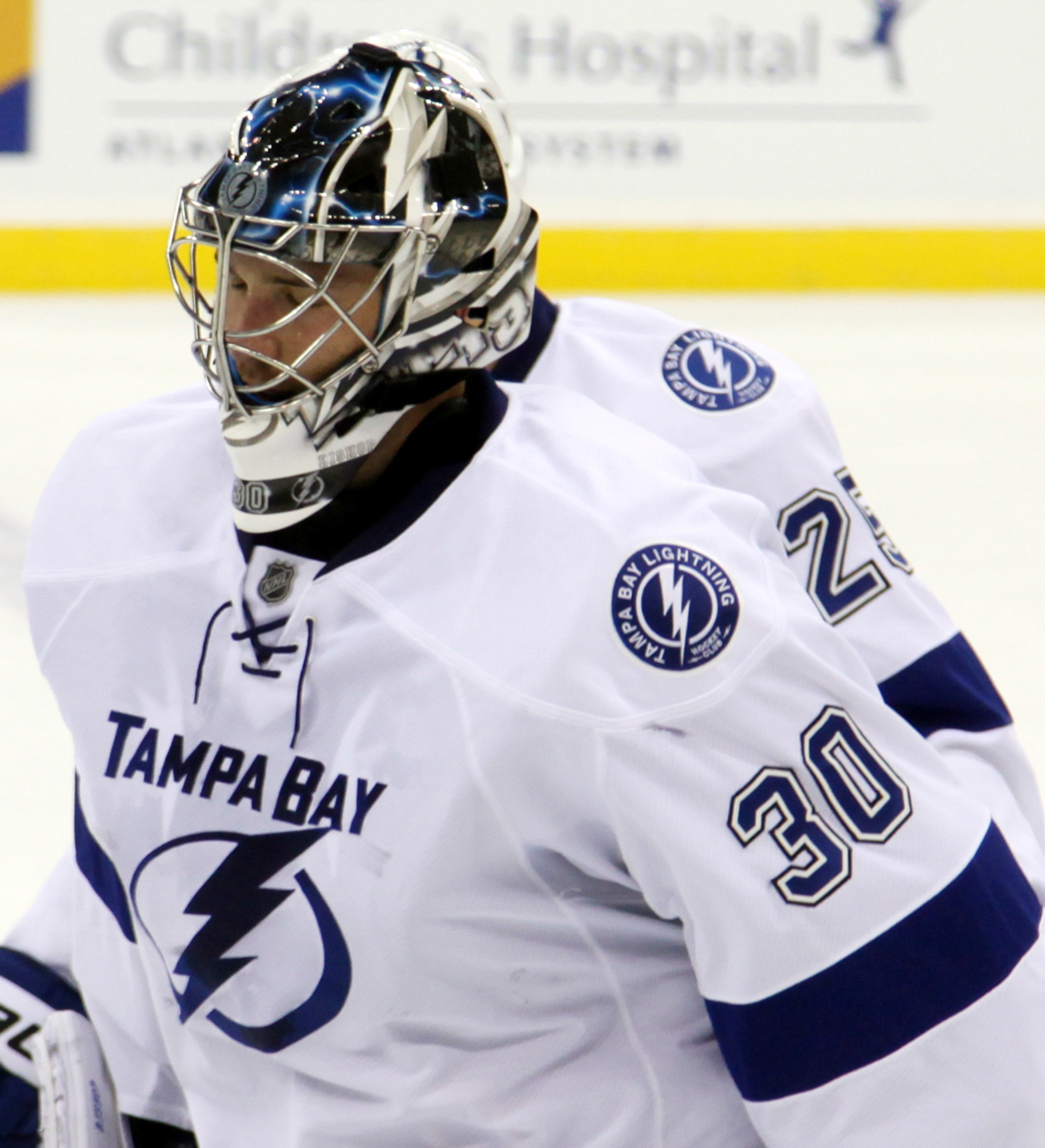
Ben Bishop was the Lightning all-time leader in all statistical categories when he left the team. He has since been surpassed by Vasilevskiy. He finished his Tampa Bay career with a 2.28 GAA and a .921 save percentage.

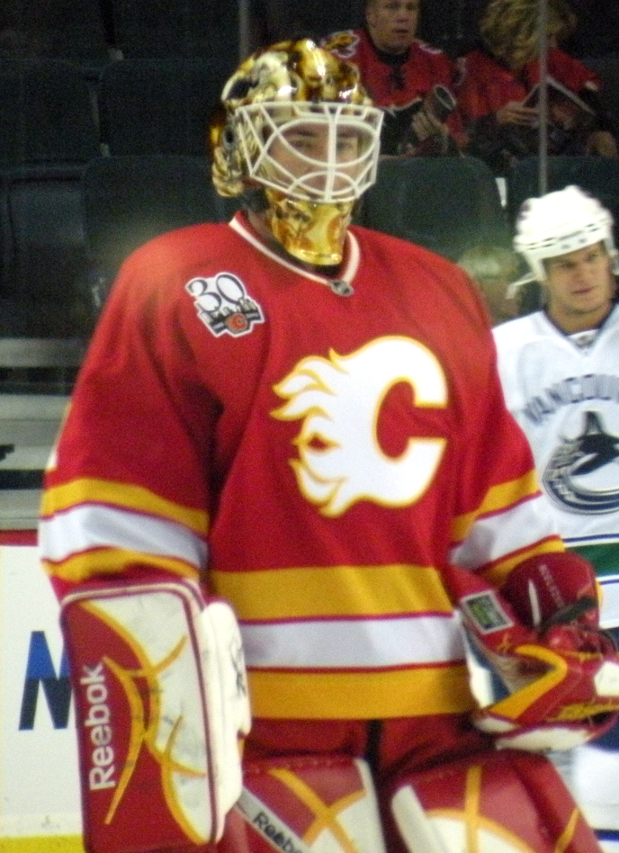
Shown with the Calgary Flames, Curtis McElhinney won the Stanley Cup as the backup goaltender in 2020 and 2021.

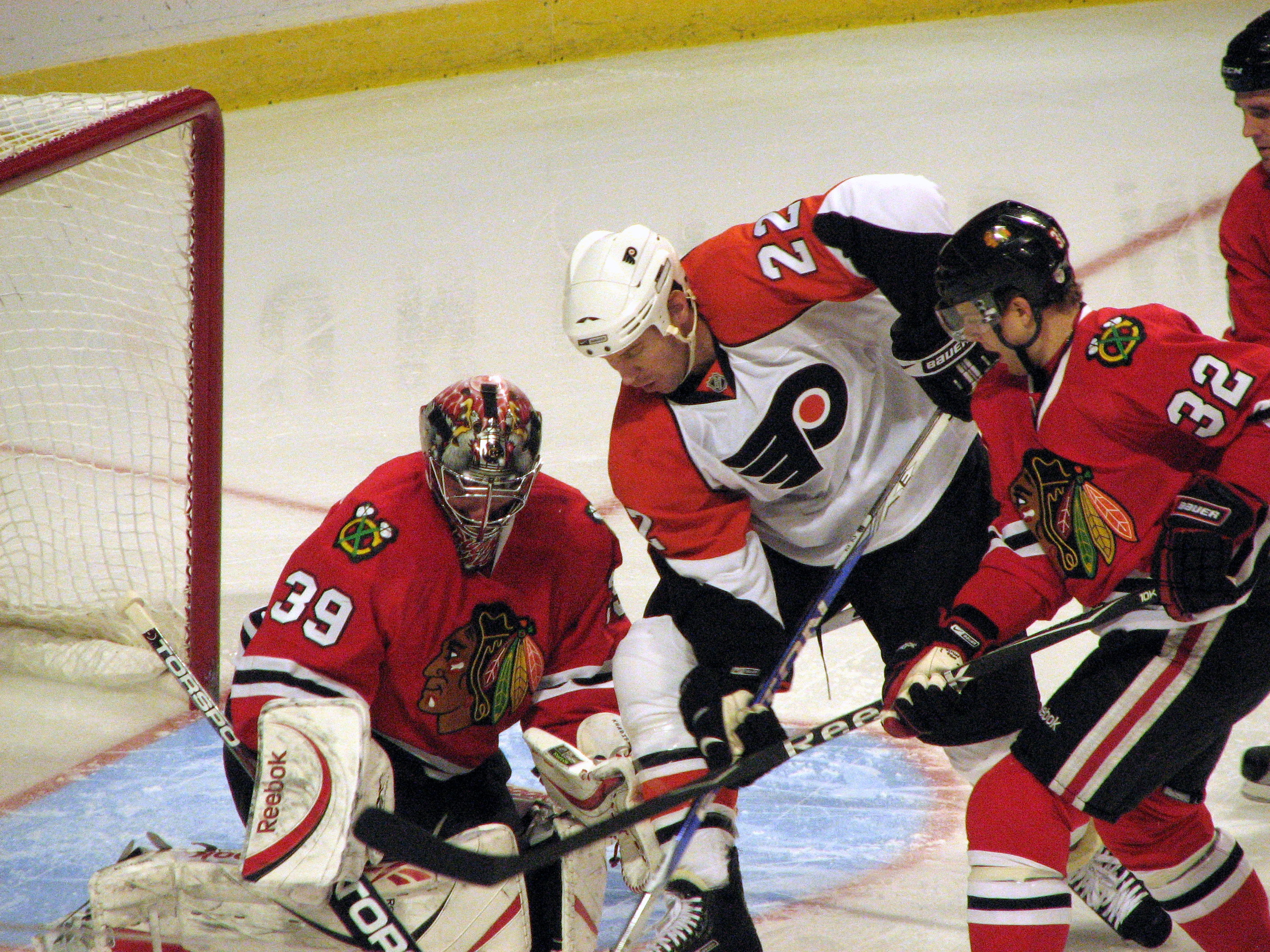
Shown with the Chicago Blackhawks, Nikolai Khabibulin appeared in 192 games with the Lightning and won the Stanley Cup as the starting goaltender in 2004.

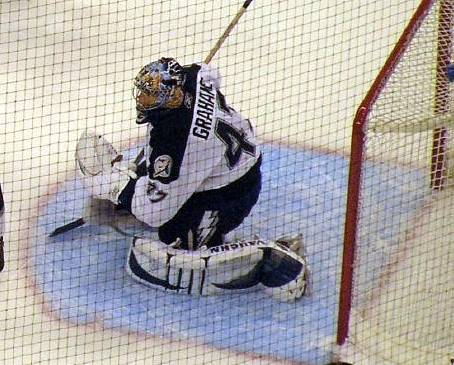
John Grahame spent four years with the Lightning and won the Stanley Cup as the backup goaltender in 2004.

	Nat	Seasons	Regular season								Playoffs						Notes
	Nat	Seasons	GP	W	L	T	OTL	SO	GAA	SV%	GP	W	L	SO	GAA	SV%	Notes
Alnefelt, Hugo	(Sweden)	2021–2022	1	0	0	—	0	0	9.00	.700	—	—	—	—	—	—	
Bergeron, Jean-Claude	(Canada)	1992–1996	53	14	26	5	—	1	3.65	.867	—	—	—	—	—	—	
Bierk, Zac	(Canada)	1997–2000	26	5	9	2	—	0	3.78	.883	—	—	—	—	—	—	
Bishop, Ben	(United States)	2012–2017	227	131	64	—	20	17	2.28	.921	36	21	13	5	2.09	.927	
Budaj, Peter	(Slovakia)	2016–2018	15	6	4	—	0	0	3.39	.884	—	—	—	—	—	—	
Burke, Sean	(Canada)	2005–2006	35	14	10	—	0	2	2.80	.895	3	0	1	0	3.84	.877	
Caron, Sebastien	(Canada)	2011–2012	3	1	1	—	0	0	3.12	.877	—	—	—	—	—	—	
Cloutier, Dan	(Canada)	1999–2000	76	12	43	6	—	1	3.50	.887	—	—	—	—	—	—	
Coleman, Gerald	(United States)	2005–2006	2	0	0	—	0	0	2.77	.882	—	—	—	—	—	—	
Denis, Marc	(Canada)	2006–2008	54	18	23	—	2	1	3.32	.879	—	—	—	—	—	—	
Desjardins, Cedrick	(Canada)	2010–2011; 2012–2014	6	1	4	—	0	0	2.41	.919	—	—	—	—	—	—	
Domingue, Louis	(Canada)	2017–2019	38	28	8	—	1	0	2.88	.910	1	0	0	0	0.00	1.00	
Eklund, Brian	(United States)	2005–2006	1	0	1	—	0	0	3.09	.842	—	—	—	—	—	—	
Elliott, Brian	(Canada)	2021–2023	41	23	12	—	5	3	2.96	.900	—	—	—	—	—	—	
Ellis, Dan	(Canada)	2010–2011	31	13	7	—	6	2	2.93	.889	—	—	—	—	—	—	
Fitzpatrick, Mark	(Canada)	1997–1998	34	7	24	1	—	1	3.16	.895	—	—	—	—	—	—	
Flaherty, Wade	(Canada)	2000–2001	2	0	2	0	—	0	4.07	.855	—	—	—	—	—	—	
Garon, Mathieu	(Canada)	2011–2013	66	28	25	—	6	1	2.86	.900	—	—	—	—	—	—	
Gibson, Christopher	(Finland)	2020–2021	2	1	1	—	0	0	2.66	.875	—	—	—	—	—	—	
Grahame, John^{†}	(United States)	2002–2006	103	53	36	5	0	8	2.64	.900	6	1	4	0	3.42	.883	SC — 2004
Gudlevskis, Kristers	(Latvia)	2013–2017	3	1	0	—	1	0	1.37	.959	2	0	1	0	3.00	.900	
Halverson, Brandon*	(United States)	2024–2026	3	0	2	—	0	0	4.70	.800	—	—	—	—	—	—	
Helenius, Riku	(Finland)	2008–2009	1	0	0	—	0	0	0.00	1.000	—	—	—	—	—	—	
Hodson, Kevin	(Canada)	1998–2000; 2002–2003	36	4	11	6	—	0	3.26	.872	—	—	—	—	—	—	
Holmqvist, Johan	(Sweden)	2006–2008	93	47	31	—	9	3	2.93	.892	6	2	4	0	2.92	.893	
Jablonski, Pat	(United States)	1992–1994	58	13	30	7	—	1	3.95	.870	—	—	—	—	—	—	
Johansson, Jonas*	(Sweden)	2023–2026	70	32	23	10	—	3	3.28	.889	—	—	—	—	—	—	
Khabibulin, Nikolai^{†}	(Russia)	2000–2004	192	83	74	28	—	14	2.39	.914	33	21	12	5	1.94	.926	SC — 2004
Kochan, Dieter	(Canada)	1999–2002	20	1	10	1	—	0	3.88	.865	—	—	—	—	—	—	
Kolzig, Olaf	(Germany)	2008–2009	8	2	4	—	1	0	3.66	.898	—	—	—	—	—	—	
Konstantinov, Evgeny	(Russia)	2000–2001; 2002–2003	2	0	0	0	—	0	2.94	.833	—	—	—	—	—	—	
Lagace, Maxime	(Canada)	2021–2022	2	1	1	—	0	0	6.11	.828	—	—	—	—	—	—	
Lindback, Anders	(Sweden)	2012–2014	47	18	22	—	3	1	2.90	.896	3	0	3	0	3.91	.881	
Littman, David	(United States)	1992–1993	1	0	1	0	—	0	9.24	.667	—	—	—	—	—	—	
McElhinney, Curtis^{†}	(Canada)	2019–2021	30	12	13	—	5	2	2.97	.895	—	—	—	—	—	—	SC — 2020, 2021
McKenna, Mike	(United States)	2008–2009	15	4	8	—	1	1	3.56	.887	—	—	—	—	—	—	
Nabokov, Evgeni	(Russia)	2014–2015	11	3	6	—	2	0	3.15	.882	—	—	—	—	—	—	
Niittymaki, Antero	(Finland)	2009–2010	49	21	18	—	5	1	2.87	.908	—	—	—	—	—	—	
Parent, Rich	(Canada)	1999–2000	14	2	7	1	—	0	3.70	.878	—	—	—	—	—	—	
Pasquale, Edward	(Canada)	2018–2019	3	2	1	—	0	0	3.96	.882	—	—	—	—	—	—	
Puppa, Daren	(Canada)	1993–2000	206	77	91	26	—	12	2.68	.905	4	1	3	0	4.85	.837	
Ramo, Karri	(Finland)	2006–2009	48	11	21	—	10	0	3.35	.895	—	—	—	—	—	—	
Ranford, Bill	(Canada)	1998–1999	32	3	18	3	—	1	3.90	.881	—	—	—	—	—	—	
Reese, Jeff	(Canada)	1995–1996	19	7	7	1	—	0	3.26	.884	5	1	1	0	3.64	.880	
Roloson, Dwayne	(Canada)	2010–2012	74	31	28	—	7	5	3.12	.898	17	10	6	1	2.51	.924	
Schwab, Corey	(Canada)	1996–1999	87	21	46	5	—	3	3.25	.893	—	—	—	—	—	—	
Smith, Mike	(Canada)	2007–2011	118	43	52	—	17	6	2.85	.905	3	1	1	0	1.00	.958	
Tabaracci, Rick	(Canada)	1996–1997	55	20	25	6	—	4	2.75	.902	—	—	—	—	—	—	
Tokarski, Dustin	(Canada)	2009–2012	7	1	3	—	1	0	3.54	.871	—	—	—	—	—	—	
Tomkins, Matt	(Canada)	2023–2024	6	3	2	—	1	0	3.33	.892	—	—	—	—	—	—	
Vasilevskiy, Andrei^{†}*	(Russia)	2014–2026	598	370	178	—	39	42	2.50	.917	127	70	54	8	2.43	.917	SC — 2020, 2021; Vezina Trophy — 2019, 2026; Conn Smythe Trophy — 2021
Weekes, Kevin	(Canada)	2000–2002	80	23	42	3	—	6	3.09	.902	—	—	—	—	—	—	
Wilkinson, Derek	(Canada)	1995–1999	22	3	12	3	—	0	3.67	.874	—	—	—	—	—	—	
Young, Wendell	(Canada)	1992–1994	40	9	22	3	—	1	3.39	.879	—	—	—	—	—	—	

== Skaters ==
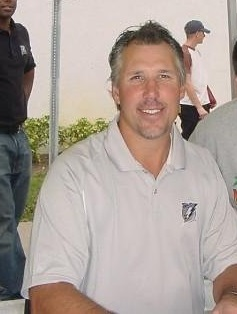
Dave Andreychuk signed as a free agent with the lightning in 2001. Andreychuk was made captain of the team in 2002. He led the team to its first Stanley Cup championship in 2004. He finished his NHL career with the team after four seasons. Andreychuk was inducted in the Hockey Hall of Fame in 2017.

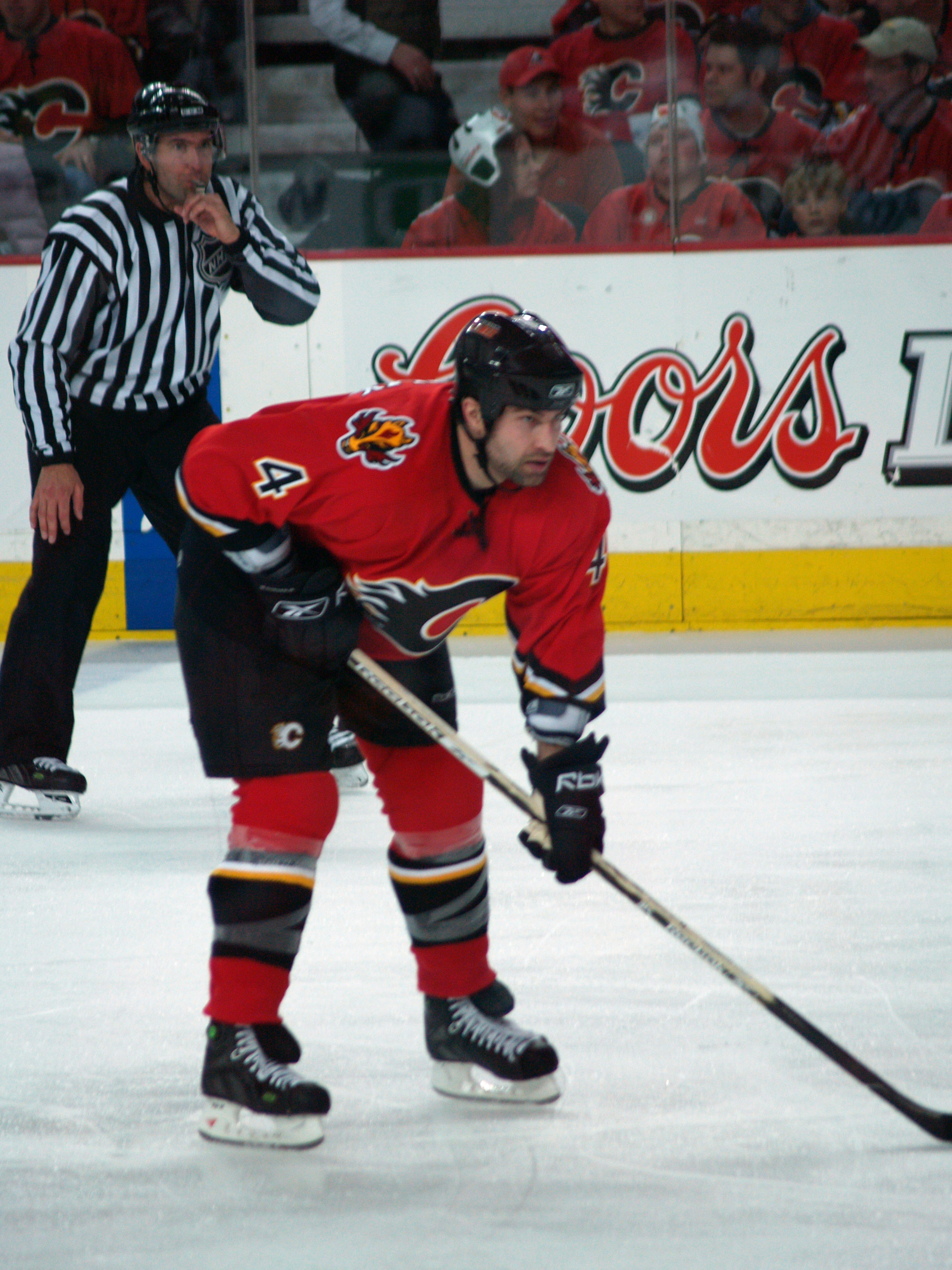
Roman Hamrlik, shown with the Calgary Flames, was the first overall pick in 1992 and the first draft pick in franchise history. Hamrlik played six seasons with the Lightning.

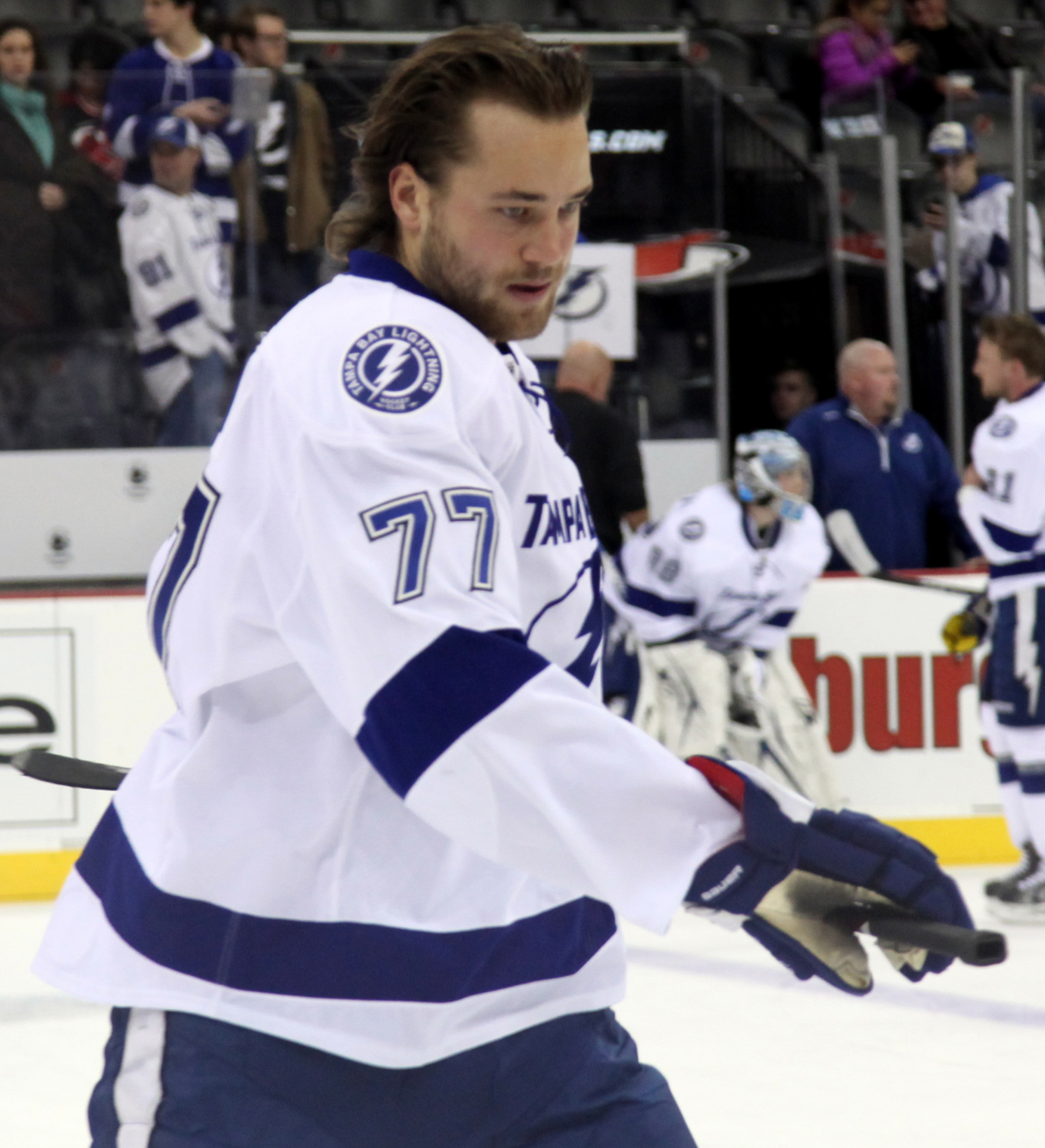
The second overall pick in 2009, Victor Hedman has won the James Norris Memorial Trophy, Conn Smythe Trophy and the Stanley Cup (2x). Hedman has the most games played (1131), goals (171), assists (623), and points (794) by a defenseman in team history. Hedman also holds the team single season record for the most goals (20), assists (65), and points (85) by a defenseman.

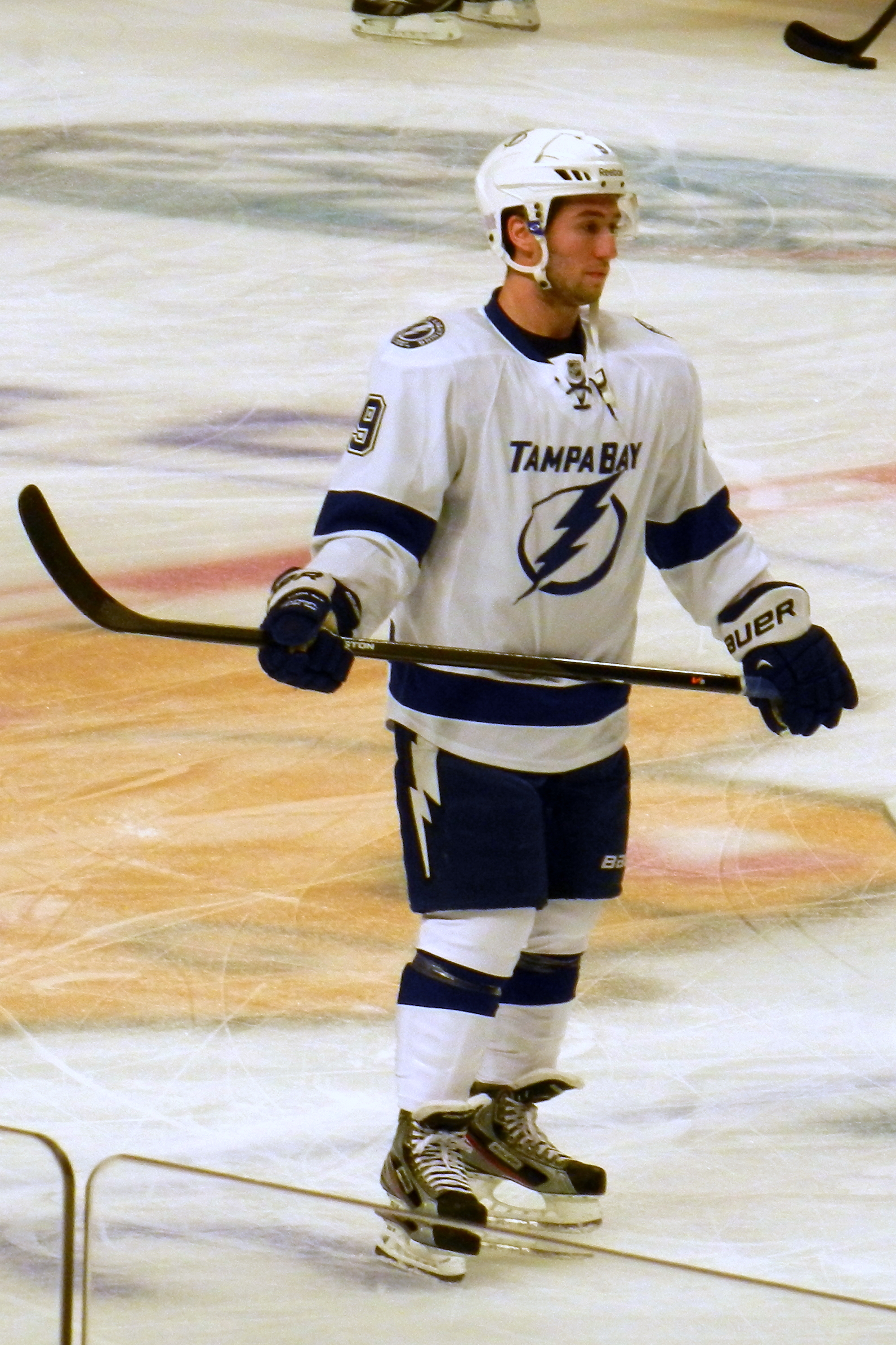
Signed as an undrafted free agent in 2011, Tyler Johnson won the Stanley Cup (2x). Johnson appeared in 589 games with the Lightning. Johnson finished his tenure with the Lightning in the top-10 in games played (7th), goals (5th), assists (9th) and points (9th).

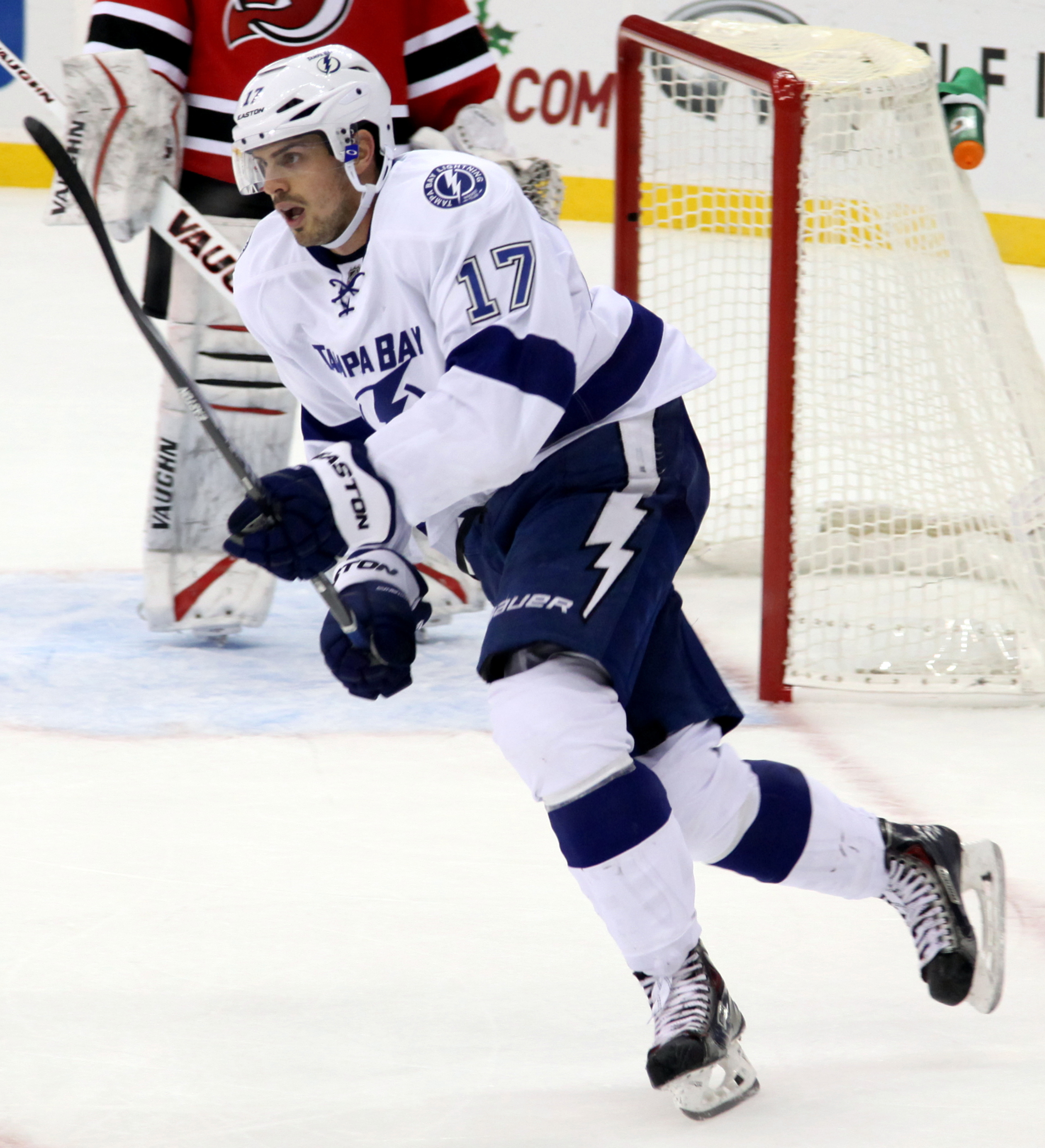
The 77th overall pick in 2007, Alex Killorn won the Stanley Cup (2x). Killorn appeared in 805 games with the Lightning. Killorn finished his tenure with the Lightning in the top-10 in games played (5th), goals (6th), assists (8th) and points (7th).

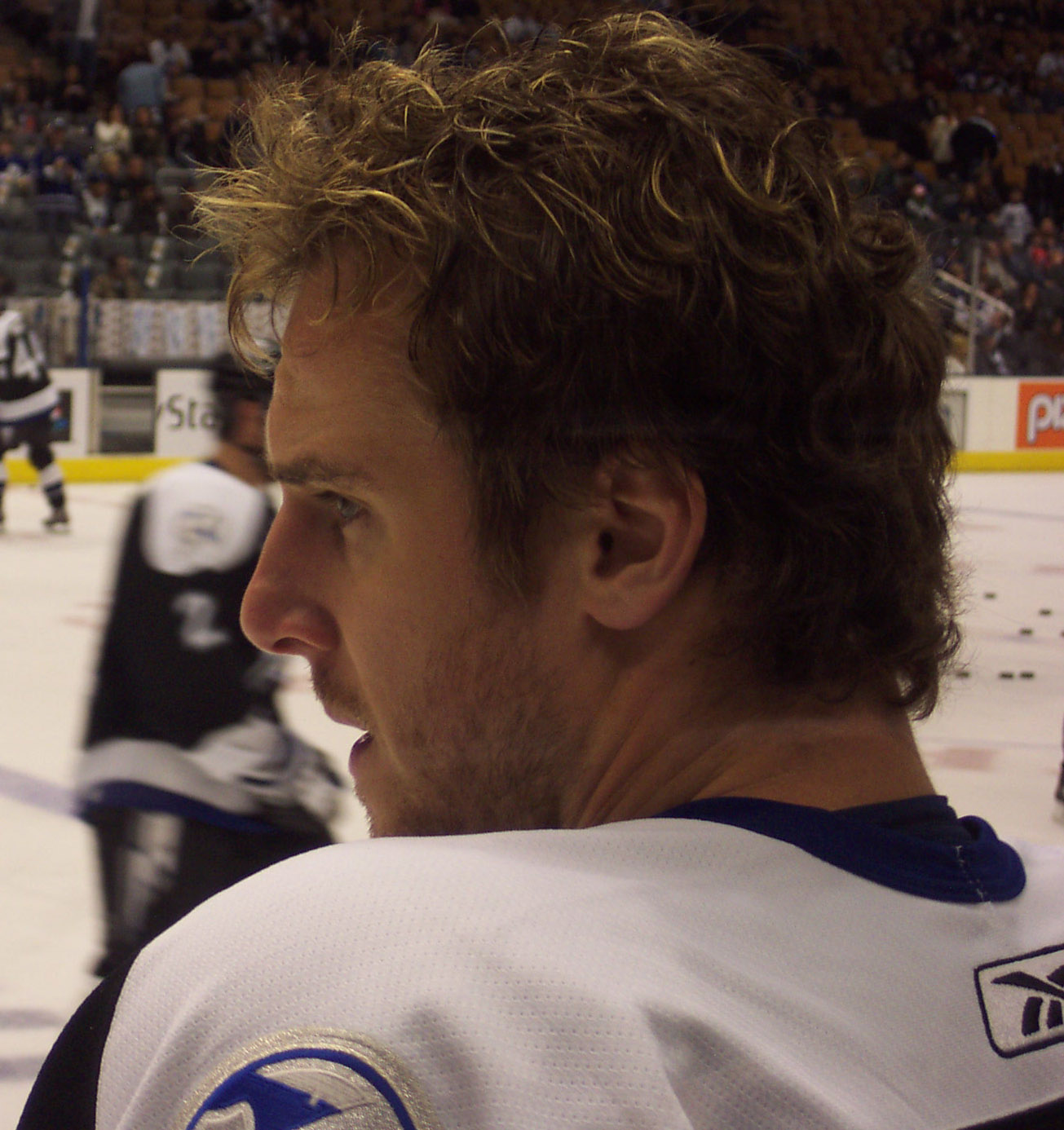
The 179th overall pick in 1996, Pavel Kubina won the Stanley Cup in 2004. Kubina spent ten seasons with the Lightning over two separate stints.

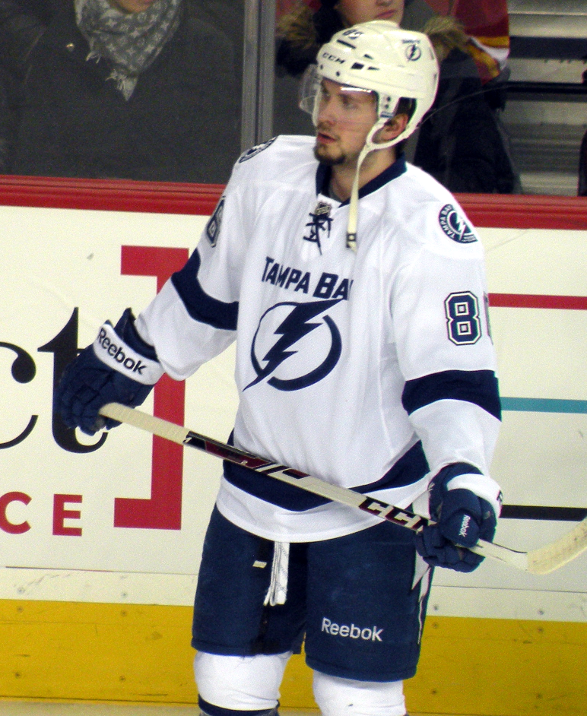
The 58th overall pick in 2011, Nikita Kucherov has won the Art Ross Trophy (3x), Hart Memorial Trophy (2x), Ted Lindsay Award (2x) and the Stanley Cup (2x). Kucherov holds the franchise record for most assists (637). Kucherov also holds the team single season record for assists (100) and points (144).

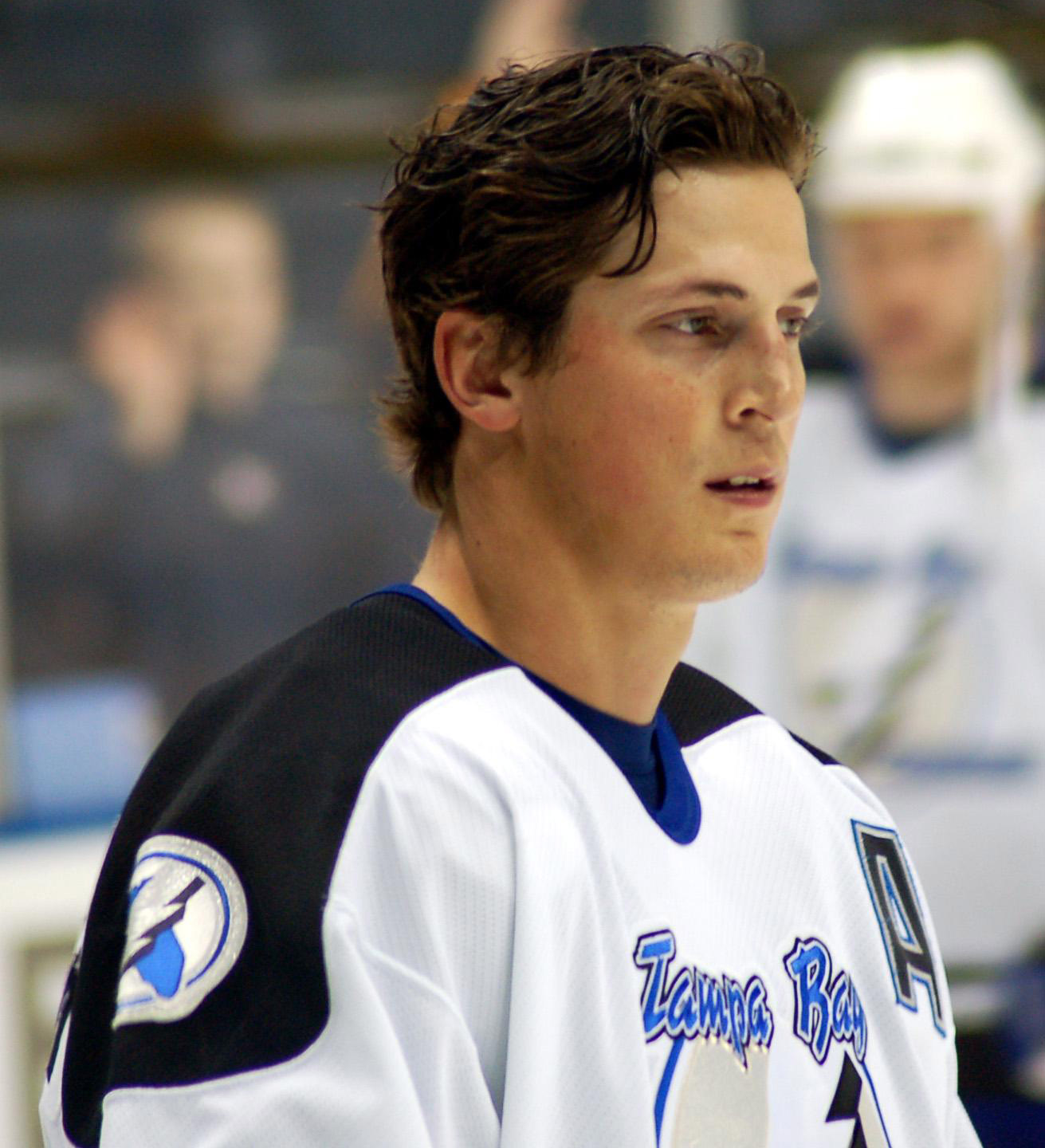
The first-overall draft pick in 1998, Vincent Lecavalier won a Stanley Cup, Rocket Richard Trophy, King Clancy Memorial Trophy and the NHL Foundation Player Award in his 14 seasons with the Lightning. Lecavalier was the second player in team history to have their jersey retired.

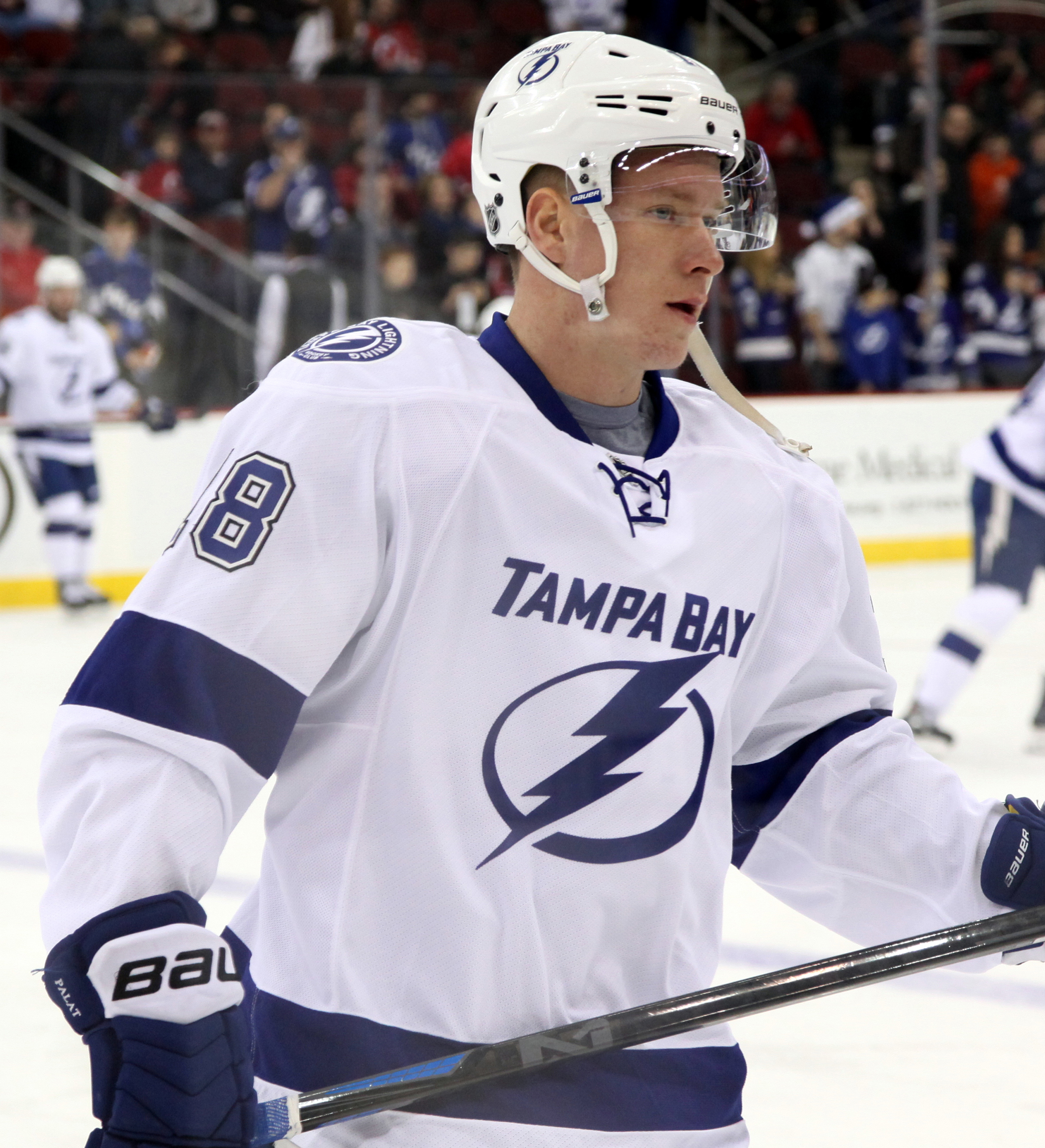
The 208th overall pick in 2011, Ondrej Palat won the Stanley Cup (2x). Palat appeared in 628 games with the Lightning. Palat finished his tenure with the Lightning in the top-10 in franchise history in games played (7th), goals (10th), assists (7th) and points (7th).

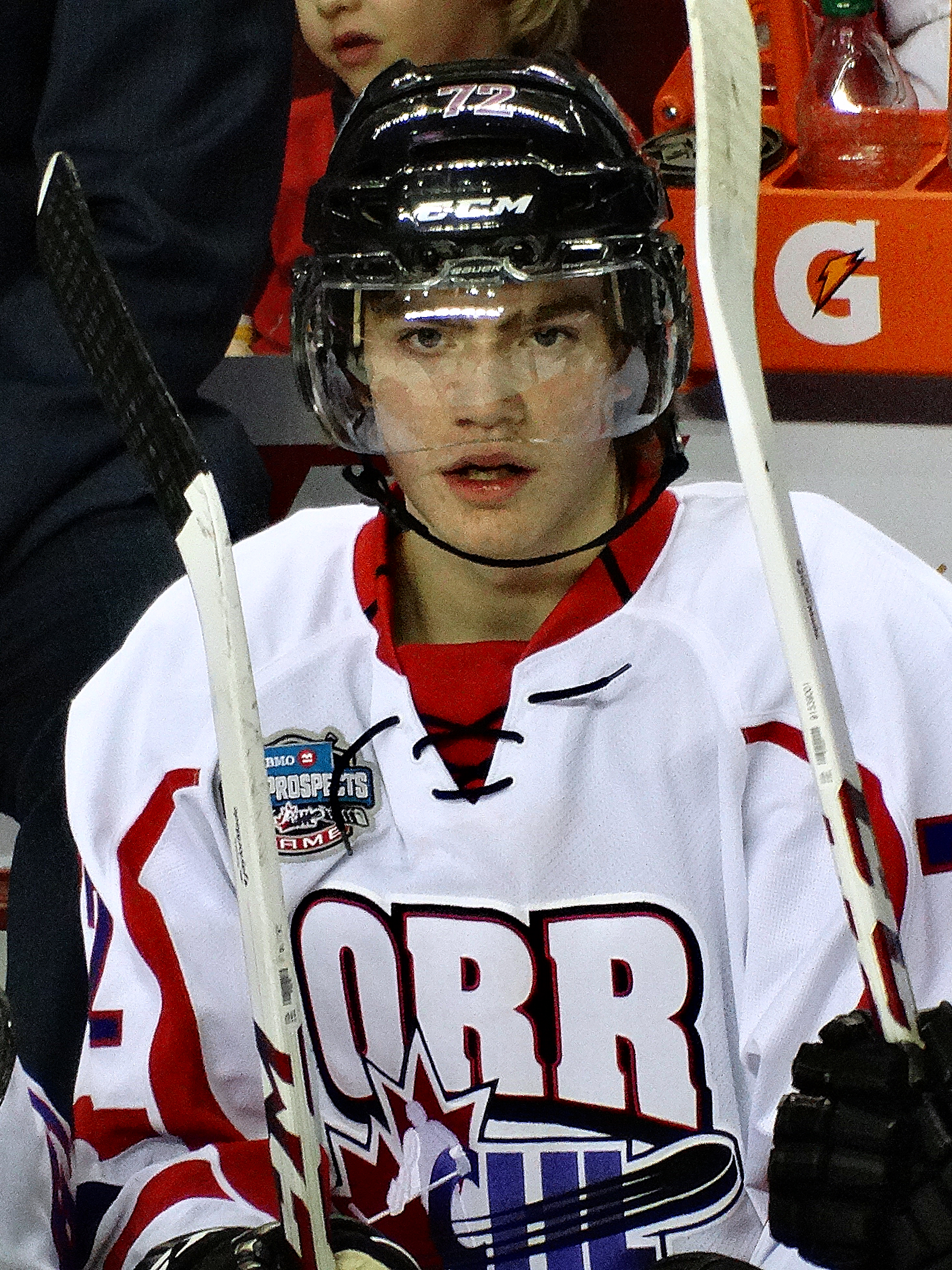
The 79th overall pick in 2014, Brayden Point has won the Stanley Cup (2x). Point has appeared in 499 games. Point is in the top-10 in franchise history in goals, assists and points.

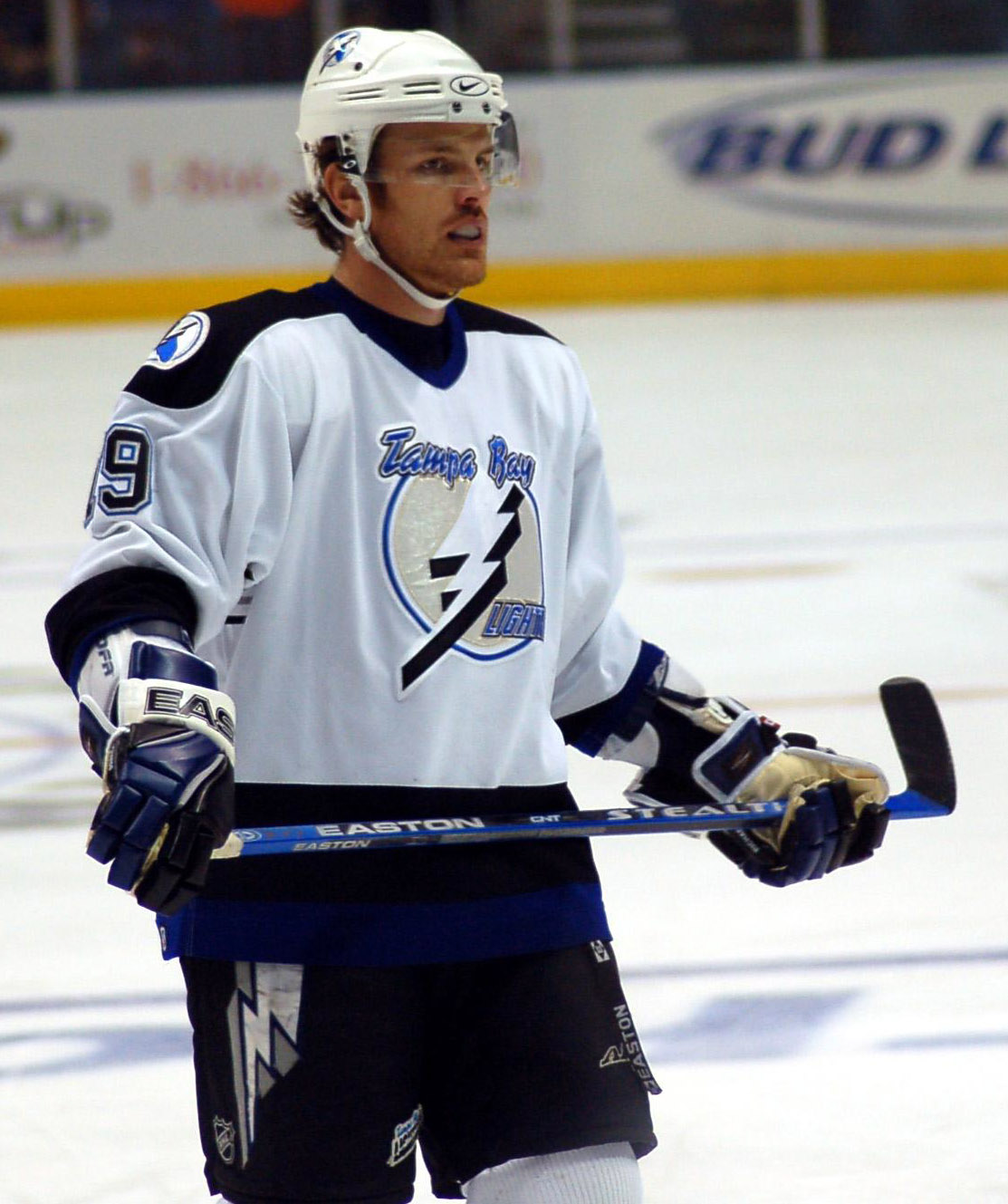
The 64th overall pick in 1998, Brad Richards won the Conn Smythe Trophy, the Lady Byng Trophy and the Stanley Cup in 2004.

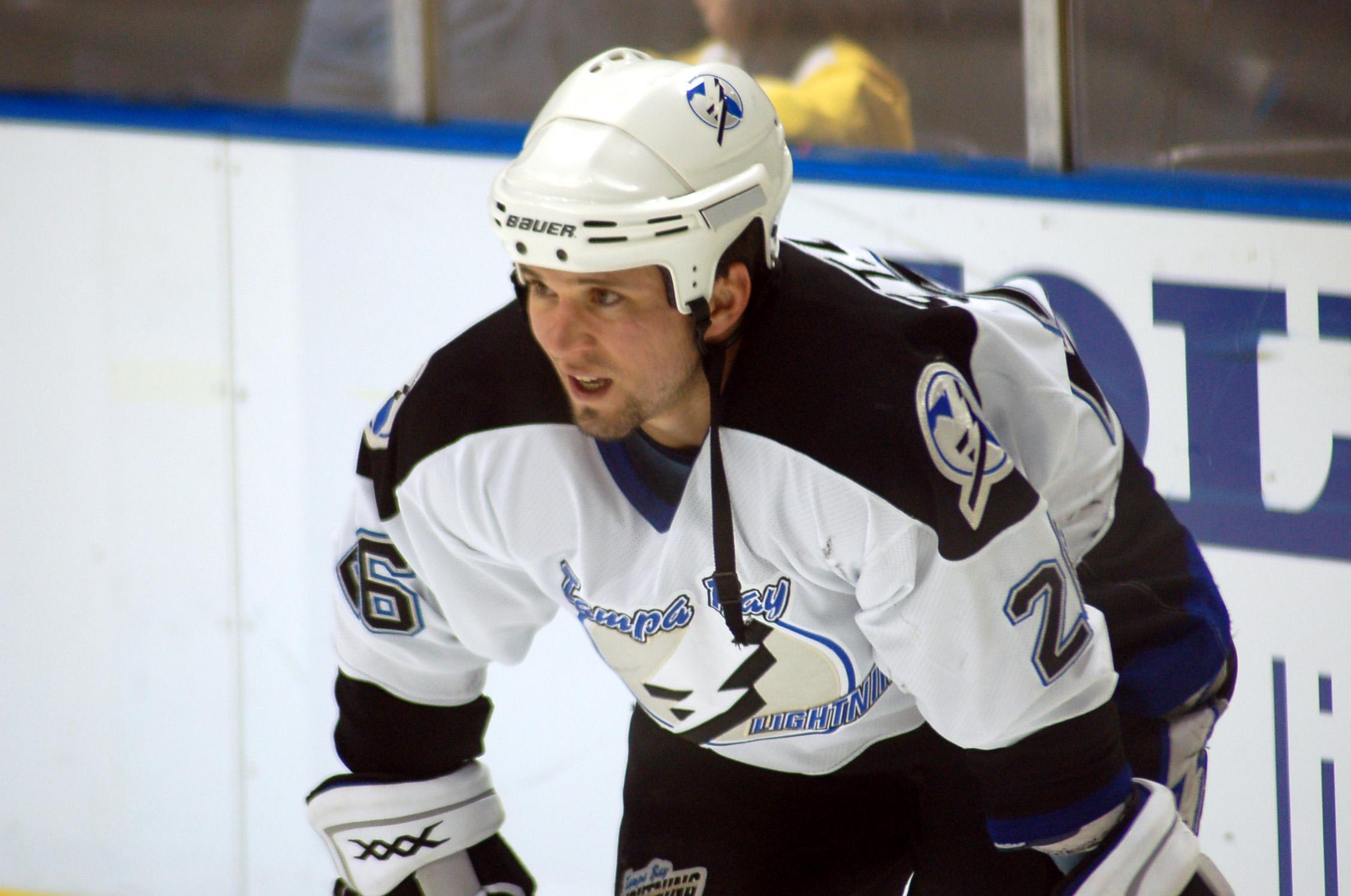
Martin St. Louis played for the Lightning from 2000 to 2014. He won the Hart Memorial Trophy, Lester B. Pearson Award, Art Ross Trophy (2x), Lady Byng Trophy (3x) and the Stanley Cup. St. Louis was the first player in franchise history to have their jersey retired. St. Louis was also inducted into the Hockey Hall of Fame in 2018.

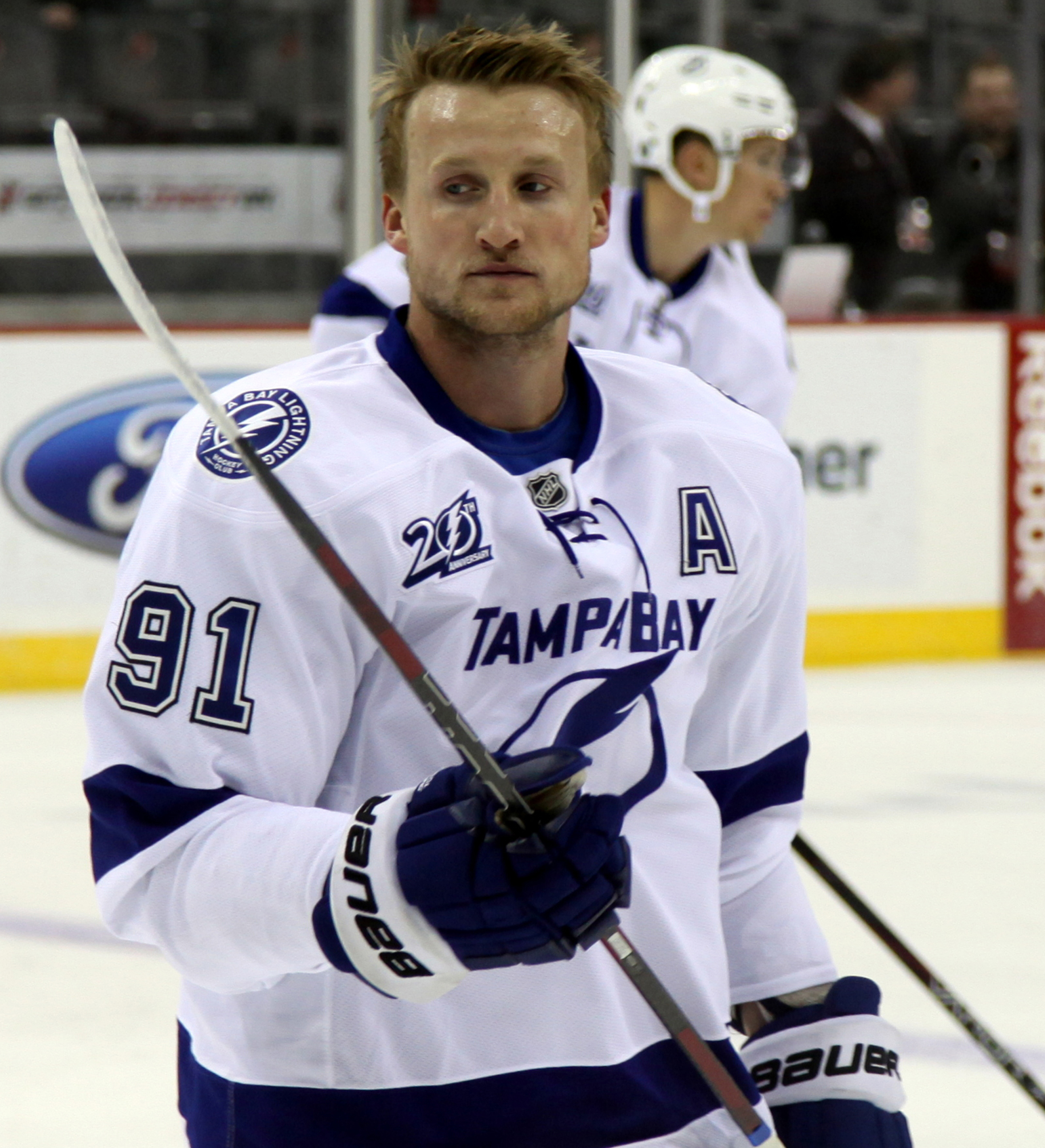
The first overall pick in 2008, Steven Stamkos won the Maurice "Rocket" Richard Trophy (2x), Mark Messier Leadership Award and the Stanley Cup (2x). Stamkos finished his career with the Lightning with the franchise record for most games played (1082), points (1137), power-play goals (214), even strength goals (336) and goals (555). Stamkos also holds the team single season record for goals (60).

	Nat	Pos	Seasons	Regular season					Playoffs					Notes
	Nat	Pos	Seasons	GP	G	A	P	PIM	GP	G	A	P	PIM	Notes
Afanasenkov, Dmitry^{†}	(Russia)	LW	2000–2007	186	19	20	39	40	28	1	3	4	8	SC — 2004
Alexeev, Nikita	(Russia)	RW	2001–2003; 2006–2007	144	18	17	35	28	11	1	0	1	0	
Andersson, Mikael	(Sweden)	RW	1992–1999	435	54	69	123	84	6	1	1	2	0	
Andreychuk, Dave^{†}	(Canada)	LW	2001–2006	278	68	61	129	201	34	4	16	20	24	Captain, 2002–2006; SC — 2004; HHOF — 2017
Angelidis, Mike	(Canada)	LW	2011–2016	14	2	0	2	22	—	—	—	—	—	
Artyukhin, Evgeny	(Russia)	RW	2005–2006; 2008–2009	145	10	23	33	241	5	1	0	1	6	
Astashenko, Kaspars	(Latvia)	D	1999–2001	23	1	2	3	8	—	—	—	—	—	
Atkinson, Cam	(United States)	RW	2024–2025	39	4	5	9	11	—	—	—	—	—	
Aucoin, Adrian	(Canada)	D	2000–2001	26	1	11	12	25	—	—	—	—	—	
Aulie, Keith	(Canada)	D	2011–2014	79	2	7	9	82	1	0	0	0	0	
Balcers, Rudolfs	(Latvia)	LW	2022–2023	3	1	0	1	0	—	—	—	—	—	
Bannister, Drew	(Canada)	D	1995–1997; 1998–1999	98	5	16	21	72	—	—	—	—	—	
Barberio, Mark	(Canada)	D	2012–2015	103	6	11	17	44	3	0	0	0	6	
Barnaby, Matthew	(Canada)	RW	2000–2002	58	4	4	8	167	—	—	—	—	—	
Barre-Boulet, Alex	(Canada)	C	2020–2024	68	12	6	18	14	—	—	—	—	—	
Beers, Bob	(United States)	D	1992–1994	80	13	29	42	82	—	—	—	—	—	
Bellemare, Pierre-Edouard	(France)	C	2021–2023	153	13	20	33	53	29	3	2	5	6	
Bellows, Brian	(Canada)	LW	1995–1997	86	24	28	52	39	—	—	—	—	—	
Bergenheim, Sean	(Finland)	LW	2010–2011	80	14	15	29	56	16	9	2	11	8	
Bergeron, Marc-Andre	(Canada)	D	2010–2013	78	7	30	37	32	14	2	1	3	9	
Bergevin, Marc	(Canada)	D	1992–1995; 2002–2003	206	5	31	36	204	—	—	—	—	—	
Bergland, Tim	(United States)	RW	1992–1994	78	9	8	17	17	—	—	—	—	—	
Betik, Karel	(Czech Republic)	D	1998–1999	3	0	2	2	2	—	—	—	—	—	
Biron, Mathieu	(Canada)	D	2001–2002	36	0	0	0	12	—	—	—	—	—	
Bjorkstrand, Oliver*	(Denmark)	RW	2024–2026	98	17	24	41	20	4	0	0	0	0	
Blunden, Mike	(Canada)	RW	2014–2016	22	3	2	5	36	7	0	0	0	4	
Bochenski, Brandon	(United States)	RW	2008–2010	35	4	10	14	4	—	—	—	—	—	
Bogosian, Zach^{†}	(United States)	D	2019–2020; 2021–2024	106	4	11	15	107	47	0	8	8	23	SC — 2020
Bonsignore, Jason	(United States)	C	1997–1999	58	2	11	13	30	—	—	—	—	—	
Borgman, Andreas	(Sweden)	D	2020–2021	7	0	2	2	4	—	—	—	—	—	
Boumedienne, Josef	(Sweden)	D	2001–2002	3	0	0	0	4	—	—	—	—	—	
Bournival, Michael	(Canada)	LW	2016–2018	24	2	1	3	2	—	—	—	—	—	
Boyle, Brian	(United States)	C	2014–2017	212	41	25	66	159	42	6	1	7	30	
Boyle, Dan^{†}	(Canada)	D	2001–2008	394	66	187	253	288	45	3	19	22	30	SC — 2004
Bradley, Brian	(Canada)	C	1992–1998	328	111	189	300	289	5	0	3	3	6	
Brewer, Eric	(Canada)	D	2010–2015	246	10	46	56	162	18	1	6	7	14	
Brousseau, Paul	(Canada)	RW	1996–1998	17	0	2	2	27	—	—	—	—	—	
Brown, J. T.	(United States)	RW	2011–2018	286	19	42	61	180	37	1	5	6	2	
Bureau, Marc	(Canada)	C	1992–1995	186	20	40	60	171	—	—	—	—	—	
Burr, Shawn	(Canada)	LW	1995–1997; 1999–2000	159	27	38	65	225	6	0	2	2	8	
Butsayev, Vyacheslav	(Russia)	C	1999–2000	2	0	0	0	0	—	—	—	—	—	
Callahan, Ryan	(United States)	RW	2013–2019	306	54	78	132	160	62	6	9	15	51	
Callander, Jock	(Canada)	RW	1992–1993	8	1	1	2	2	—	—	—	—	—	
Campbell, Jim	(United States)	RW	2005–2006	1	0	0	0	2	—	—	—	—	—	
Capuano, Dave	(United States)	LW	1992–1993	6	1	1	2	2	—	—	—	—	—	
Carle, Matt	(United States)	D	2008–2009; 2012–2016	265	14	68	82	90	43	1	8	9	8	
Carlile, Declan*	(United States)	D	2023–2026	46	2	2	4	40	2	0	0	0	0	
Cernak, Erik^{†}*	(Slovakia)	D	2018–2026	502	26	94	120	441	91	3	19	22	50	SC — 2020, 2021
Chaffee, Mitchell*	(United States)	RW	2023–2026	107	16	10	26	29	9	1	0	1	2	
Chambers, Shawn	(United States)	D	1992–1995	145	23	64	87	65	—	—	—	—	—	
Charron, Eric	(Canada)	D	1993–1996	63	1	4	5	46	—	—	—	—	—	
Cibak, Martin^{†}	(Slovakia)	C	2001–2002; 2003–2006	154	5	18	23	60	11	0	1	1	0	SC — 2004
Ciccarelli, Dino^{†}	(Canada)	RW	1996–1998	111	46	31	77	158	—	—	—	—	—	HHOF — 2010
Ciccone, Enrico	(Canada)	D	1993–1996; 1997–1999	135	5	9	14	604	—	—	—	—	—	
Ciger, Zdeno	(Slovakia)	LW	2001–2002	27	6	6	12	10	—	—	—	—	—	
Cirelli, Anthony^{†}*	(Canada)	C	2017–2026	582	147	197	344	297	115	18	27	45	58	SC — 2020, 2021
Claesson, Fredrik	(Sweden)	D	2020–2022	11	0	0	0	12	—	—	—	—	—	
Clark, Brett	(Canada)	D	2010–2012	164	11	35	46	34	21	3	2	5	4	
Clark, Wendel	(Canada)	LW	1998–1999	65	28	14	42	35	—	—	—	—	—	
Clymer, Ben^{†}	(United States)	RW	1999–2004	295	29	47	76	251	16	0	2	2	6	SC — 2004
Coburn, Braydon^{†}	(Canada)	D	2014–2020	350	12	54	66	202	65	1	8	9	52	SC — 2020
Cole, Danton	(United States)	RW	1992–1995	174	35	41	76	61	—	—	—	—	—	
Cole, Ian	(United States)	D	2022–2023	78	3	14	17	61	6	1	2	3	4	
Coleman, Blake^{†}	(United States)	C	2019–2021	64	14	18	32	53	48	8	16	24	53	SC — 2020, 2021
Colton, Ross^{†}	(United States)	C	2020–2023	190	47	36	83	90	52	10	9	19	29	SC — 2021
Commodore, Mike	(Canada)	D	2011–2012	13	0	0	0	17	—	—	—	—	—	
Conacher, Cory	(Canada)	LW	2012–2013; 2016–2020	87	18	23	41	50	2	0	0	0	10	
Condra, Erik	(United States)	RW	2015–2017	67	6	5	11	38	3	0	0	0	0	
Connolly, Brett	(Canada)	RW	2011–2015	134	18	14	32	72	—	—	—	—	—	
Cote, Alain	(Canada)	D	1992–1993	2	0	0	0	0	—	—	—	—	—	
Cote, Jean-Philippe	(Canada)	D	2013–2014	19	0	4	4	22	—	—	—	—	—	
Craig, Ryan	(Canada)	C	2005–2010	184	32	31	63	126	11	0	0	0	22	
Creighton, Adam	(Canada)	C	1992–1994	136	29	30	59	147	—	—	—	—	—	
Crombeen, B. J.	(United States)	RW	2012–2014	99	4	14	18	191	2	0	0	0	0	
Cross, Cory	(Canada)	D	1993–1999	336	12	46	58	377	6	0	0	0	22	
Crossman, Doug	(Canada)	D	1992–1993	40	8	21	29	18	—	—	—	—	—	
Crozier, Max*	(Canada)	D	2023–2026	53	1	11	12	47	5	0	0	0	4	
Cullen, John	(Canada)	C	1995–1997; 1998–1999	150	34	71	105	162	5	3	3	6	0	Bill Masterton Trophy — 1999
Cullimore, Jassen^{†}	(Canada)	D	1997–2004	408	15	38	53	396	22	1	3	4	10	SC — 2004
Cummins, Jim	(United States)	RW	1993–1995	14	1	0	1	54	—	—	—	—	—	
D'Astous, Charle-Edouard*	(Canada)	D	2025–2026	70	6	23	29	112	3	0	1	1	2	
Daigle, Alexandre	(Canada)	RW	1998–1999	32	6	6	12	2	—	—	—	—	—	
Darche, Mathieu	(Canada)	LW	2007–2008	73	7	15	22	20	—	—	—	—	—	
Day, Sean	(Canada)	D	2021–2022	2	0	0	0	0	—	—	—	—	—	
de Haan, Calvin	(Canada)	D	2023–2024	59	3	7	10	22	1	0	0	0	0	
DeBrusk, Louie	(Canada)	LW	1997–1998	54	1	2	3	166	—	—	—	—	—	
Delisle, Xavier	(Canada)	C	1998–1999	2	0	0	0	0	—	—	—	—	—	
DiMaio, Rob	(Canada)	RW	1992–1994; 2005–2006	154	21	35	56	132	2	0	0	0	0	
Dingman, Chris^{†}	(Canada)	LW	2001–2006	173	3	11	14	279	36	2	1	3	86	SC — 2004
Dotchin, Jake	(Canada)	D	2016–2018	83	3	19	22	73	—	—	—	—	—	
Douglas, Curtis*	(Canada)	C	2025–2026	29	0	2	2	92	—	—	—	—	—	
Downie, Steve	(Canada)	RW	2008–2012	214	47	65	112	554	17	2	12	14	40	
Drouin, Jonathan	(Canada)	LW	2014–2017	164	29	66	95	54	23	5	9	14	16	
Drulia, Stan	(United States)	RW	1992–1993; 1999–2001	126	15	27	42	52	—	—	—	—	—	
Duclair, Anthony	(Canada)	LW	2023–2024	17	8	7	15	6	5	0	2	2	0	
Dufresne, Donald	(Canada)	D	1993–1994	51	2	6	8	48	—	—	—	—	—	
Duke, Dylan*	(United States)	LW	2024–2026	3	1	0	1	0	—	—	—	—	—	
Dumba, Matt	(Canada)	D	2023–2024	18	0	2	2	33	5	0	0	0	0	
Dumont, Gabriel	(Canada)	C	2016–2018	46	2	2	4	33	—	—	—	—	—	
Dwyer, Gordie	(Canada)	LW	1999–2001	78	0	4	4	291	—	—	—	—	—	
Dykhuis, Karl	(Canada)	D	1997–1999	111	7	10	17	128	—	—	—	—	—	
Egeland, Allan	(Canada)	C	1995–1998	17	0	0	0	16	—	—	—	—	—	
Ekman, Nils	(Sweden)	RW	1999–2001	71	11	13	24	76	—	—	—	—	—	
Elich, Matt	(United States)	RW	1999–2001	16	1	1	2	0	—	—	—	—	—	
Elie, Remi	(Canada)	LW	2021–2022	1	0	0	0	0	—	—	—	—	—	
Elynuik, Pat	(Canada)	RW	1993–1994	63	12	14	26	64	—	—	—	—	—	
Eminger, Steve	(Canada)	D	2008–2009	50	4	19	23	36	—	—	—	—	—	
Emmons, John	(United States)	C	2000–2001	12	1	1	2	22	—	—	—	—	—	
Erne, Adam	(United States)	LW	2016–2019	114	13	14	27	62	3	0	0	0	2	
Eyssimont, Michael	(United States)	C	2022–2025	153	17	20	37	170	8	1	1	2	2	
Fedoruk, Todd	(Canada)	LW	2009–2010	50	3	3	6	54	—	—	—	—	—	
Fedotenko, Ruslan^{†}	(Ukraine)	LW	2002–2007	313	74	70	144	170	42	12	3	15	40	SC — 2004
Filppula, Valtteri	(Finland)	C	2013–2017	292	52	119	171	114	47	5	17	22	4	
Finley, Jack*	(United States)	C	2024–2026	23	2	1	3	21	—	—	—	—	—	
Finn, Steven	(Canada)	D	1995–1996	16	0	0	0	24	—	—	—	—	—	
Fleury, Haydn	(Canada)	D	2022–2024	53	1	5	6	34	1	0	0	0	0	
Foote, Cal^{†}	(Canada)	D	2020–2023	117	4	11	15	86	13	0	2	2	6	SC — 2021
Forbes, Colin	(Canada)	LW	1998–2000	22	3	1	4	28	—	—	—	—	—	
Fortier, Gabriel	(Canada)	LW	2021–2023	11	1	0	1	4	—	—	—	—	—	
Foster, Kurtis	(Canada)	D	2009–2010	71	8	34	42	48	—	—	—	—	—	
Freadrich, Kyle	(Canada)	LW	1999–2001	23	0	1	1	75	—	—	—	—	—	
Froese, Byron	(Canada)	C	2016–2017	4	0	0	0	0	—	—	—	—	—	
Gagne, Simon	(Canada)	LW	2010–2011	63	17	23	40	20	15	5	7	12	4	
Galanov, Maxim	(Russia)	D	2000–2001	25	0	5	5	8	—	—	—	—	—	
Gallant, Gerard	(Canada)	LW	1993–1995	52	4	9	13	74	—	—	—	—	—	
Gardiner, Bruce	(Canada)	RW	1999–2000	41	3	6	9	37	—	—	—	—	—	
Garrison, Jason	(Canada)	D	2014–2017	212	10	40	50	51	40	3	11	14	20	
Gaunce, Cameron	(Canada)	D	2018–2020	5	1	3	4	11	—	—	—	—	—	
Gavey, Aaron	(Canada)	C	1995–1997	89	9	6	15	68	6	0	0	0	4	
Geekie, Conor*	(Canada)	C	2024–2026	66	9	8	17	24	6	0	1	1	4	
Gervais, Bruno	(Canada)	D	2011–2012	50	6	7	13	8	—	—	—	—	—	
Gilhen, Randy	(Canada)	C	1992–1993	11	0	2	2	6	—	—	—	—	—	
Gilroy, Matt	(United States)	D	2011–2012	53	2	15	17	16	—	—	—	—	—	
Girardi, Dan	(Canada)	D	2017–2019	138	10	23	33	39	21	2	1	3	6	
Girgensons, Zemgus*	(Latvia)	C	2024–2026	156	11	15	26	78	12	0	0	0	4	
Glendening, Luke	(United States)	C	2023–2025	158	14	4	18	49	10	1	1	2	0	
Goc, Sascha	(Germany)	D	2001–2002	9	0	0	0	0	—	—	—	—	—	
Goncalves, Gage*	(Canada)	C	2023–2026	136	19	34	53	61	12	2	5	7	2	
Goodrow, Barclay^{†}	(Canada)	RW	2019–2021	63	6	16	22	69	43	3	9	12	42	SC — 2020, 2021
Gourde, Yanni^{†}*	(Canada)	LW	2015–2021; 2024–2026	413	90	139	229	301	81	16	15	31	50	SC — 2020, 2021
Gratton, Chris	(Canada)	C	1993–1997; 1998–2000; 2007–2009	482	98	161	259	828	6	0	2	2	27	Captain, 1999–2000
Gretzky, Brent	(Canada)	C	1993–1995	13	1	3	4	2	—	—	—	—	—	
Groshev, Maxim*	(Russia)	D	2025–2026	2	0	1	1	0	—	—	—	—	—	
Gudas, Radko	(Czech Republic)	D	2012–2015	126	7	25	32	224	3	0	1	1	9	
Guentzel, Jake*	(United States)	C	2024–2026	161	79	89	168	85	12	5	9	14	14	
Guolla, Steve	(Canada)	C	1999–2000	46	6	10	16	11	—	—	—	—	—	
Gusev, Sergei	(Russia)	D	1998–2001	58	3	6	9	26	—	—	—	—	—	
Hagel, Brandon*	(Canada)	LW	2021–2026	338	131	179	310	257	44	12	12	24	45	
Hale, David	(United States)	D	2009–2010	39	0	4	4	25	—	—	—	—	—	
Halkidis, Bob	(Canada)	D	1994–1996	30	1	3	4	47	—	—	—	—	—	
Hall, Adam	(United States)	RW	2008–2009; 2010–2013	233	14	25	39	101	18	1	4	5	8	
Halpern, Jeff	(United States)	C	2007–2010	126	26	25	51	73	—	—	—	—	—	
Hamrlik, Roman	(Czech Republic)	D	1992–1998	377	52	133	185	474	5	0	1	1	4	
Hankinson, Ben	(United States)	RW	1994–1995	18	0	2	2	6	—	—	—	—	—	
Harju, Johan	(Sweden)	LW	2010–2011	10	1	2	3	2	—	—	—	—	—	
Hartman, Mike	(United States)	LW	1992–1993	58	4	4	8	154	—	—	—	—	—	
Hay, Dwayne	(Canada)	LW	1999–2000	13	1	1	2	2	—	—	—	—	—	
Hedman, Victor^{†}*	(Sweden)	D	2009–2026	1164	172	639	811	782	170	23	97	120	94	Captain, 2024–Current; SC — 2020, 2021; Conn Smythe Trophy — 2020; James Norris Memorial Trophy — 2018
Helbling, Timo	(Switzerland)	D	2005–2006	9	0	1	1	6	—	—	—	—	—	
Helenius, Sami	(Finland)	D	1998–1999	4	1	0	1	15	—	—	—	—	—	
Herbers, Ian	(Canada)	D	1999–2000	37	0	0	0	45	—	—	—	—	—	
Hervey, Matt	(United States)	D	1992–1993	17	0	4	4	38	—	—	—	—	—	
Heward, Jamie	(Canada)	D	2008–2009	13	0	2	2	4	—	—	—	—	—	
Hlavac, Jan	(Czech Republic)	LW	2007–2008	62	9	13	22	32	—	—	—	—	—	
Hodge Jr., Ken	(Canada)	C	1992–1993	25	2	7	9	2	—	—	—	—	—	
Hogue, Benoit	(Canada)	LW	1998–1999	62	11	14	25	50	—	—	—	—	—	
Holmberg, Pontus*	(Sweden)	RW	2025–2026	70	11	11	22	31	—	—	—	—	—	
Holzinger, Brian	(United States)	C	1999–2003	112	15	31	46	91	—	—	—	—	—	
Houlder, Bill	(Canada)	D	1995–1997; 1999–2000	154	10	46	56	54	6	0	1	1	4	Captain, 1999–2000
Hull, Jody	(Canada)	RW	1997–1998	28	2	4	6	4	—	—	—	—	—	
Huscroft, Jamie	(Canada)	D	1996–1998	57	0	4	4	156	—	—	—	—	—	
Hutchinson, Andrew	(United States)	D	2008–2009	2	0	0	0	0	—	—	—	—	—	
Jackson, Scott	(Canada)	D	2009–2010	1	0	0	0	0	—	—	—	—	—	
James, Dominic*	(United States)	C	2025–2026	43	7	8	15	8	7	2	1	3	0	
Jancevski, Dan	(Canada)	D	2007–2008	2	0	0	0	2	—	—	—	—	—	
Janik, Doug	(United States)	D	2006–2008	136	3	12	15	98	1	0	0	0	0	
Janney, Craig	(United States)	C	1998–1999	38	4	18	22	10	—	—	—	—	—	USHHOF — 2016
Jeannot, Tanner	(Canada)	LW	2022–2024	75	8	10	18	97	7	0	1	1	7	
Johansson, Andreas	(Sweden)	LW	1999–2000	12	2	3	5	8	—	—	—	—	—	
Johnson, Mike	(Canada)	RW	1999–2001	92	21	39	60	42	—	—	—	—	—	
Johnson, Ryan	(Canada)	C	1999–2001	94	7	16	23	46	—	—	—	—	—	
Johnson, Tyler^{†}	(United States)	C	2012–2021	589	161	200	361	186	116	32	33	65	53	SC — 2020, 2021
Jokinen, Jussi	(Finland)	LW	2007–2009	66	8	22	30	20	—	—	—	—	—	
Jones, Blair	(Canada)	C	2006–2012	78	4	6	10	24	7	0	0	0	2	
Jones, Randy	(Canada)	D	2010–2011	61	1	12	13	15	5	0	1	1	2	
Joseph, Chris	(Canada)	D	1993–1994	66	10	19	29	108	—	—	—	—	—	
Joseph, Mathieu^{†}	(Canada)	RW	2018–2022	221	37	33	70	75	10	0	2	2	0	SC — 2020, 2021
Karlsson, Andreas	(Sweden)	C	2006–2010	111	5	8	13	22	6	0	0	0	0	
Karsums, Martins	(Latvia)	RW	2008–2009	18	1	4	5	6	—	—	—	—	—	
Kasper, Steve	(Canada)	C	1992–1993	47	3	4	7	18	—	—	—	—	—	
Katchouk, Boris*	(Canada)	LW	2021–2022; 2025–2026	41	2	4	6	25	—	—	—	—	—	
Keefe, Sheldon	(Canada)	RW	2000–2003	125	12	12	24	78	—	—	—	—	—	
Kelly, Steve	(Canada)	C	1997–1999	58	3	4	7	42	—	—	—	—	—	
Kesa, Dan	(Canada)	RW	1999–2000	50	4	10	14	21	—	—	—	—	—	
Kharitonov, Alexander	(Russia)	RW	2000–2001	66	7	15	22	8	—	—	—	—	—	
Killorn, Alex^{†}	(Canada)	LW	2012–2023	805	198	268	466	481	140	37	40	77	121	SC — 2020, 2021
Kinrade, Geoff	(Canada)	D	2008–2009	1	0	0	0	0	—	—	—	—	—	
Klima, Petr	(Czech Republic)	RW	1993–1996	189	63	70	133	170	4	2	0	2	14	
Koci, David	(Czech Republic)	LW	2008–2009	33	1	1	2	132	—	—	—	—	—	
Koekkoek, Slater	(Canada)	D	2014–2019	85	5	9	14	34	10	0	1	1	2	
Koepke, Cole	(United States)	LW	2022–2024	26	1	2	3	2	—	—	—	—	—	
Konopka, Zenon	(Canada)	C	2008–2010	81	2	4	6	294	—	—	—	—	—	
Kontos, Chris	(Canada)	C	1992–1993	66	27	24	51	12	—	—	—	—	—	
Korobov, Dimitry	(Belarus)	D	2013–2014	3	0	1	1	2	—	—	—	—	—	
Kostka, Michael	(Canada)	D	2013–2014	19	2	6	8	0	3	0	2	2	0	
Krajicek, Lukas	(Czech Republic)	D	2008–2010	94	2	18	20	69	—	—	—	—	—	
Kuba, Filip	(Czech Republic)	D	2006–2008	156	21	47	68	76	6	1	4	5	4	
Kubina, Pavel^{†}	(Czech Republic)	D	1997–2006; 2010–2012	662	72	171	243	784	46	3	6	9	98	SC — 2004
Kucherov, Nikita^{†}*	(Russia)	RW	2013–2026	879	401	723	1124	436	159	54	123	177	126	SC — 2020, 2021; Art Ross Trophy — 2019, 2024, 2025; Ted Lindsay Award — 2019, 2025; Hart Memorial Trophy — 2019, 2026
Kudroc, Kristian	(Slovakia)	D	2000–2002	24	2	2	4	36	—	—	—	—	—	
Kunitz, Chris	(Canada)	LW	2017–2018	82	13	16	29	35	17	0	1	1	16	
Kunyk, Cody	(Canada)	RW	2013–2014	1	0	0	0	0	—	—	—	—	—	
Labrie, Pierre-Cedric	(Canada)	LW	2011–2014	46	2	3	5	65	—	—	—	—	—	
Lafreniere, Jason	(Canada)	C	1992–1994	12	3	3	6	4	—	—	—	—	—	
Langkow, Daymond	(Canada)	C	1995–1999	173	27	34	61	112	—	—	—	—	—	
Larocque, Mario	(Canada)	D	1998–1999	5	0	0	0	16	—	—	—	—	—	
Lashoff, Matt	(United States)	D	2008–2010	17	0	7	7	31	—	—	—	—	—	
Laukkanen, Janne	(Finland)	D	2002–2003	2	1	0	1	0	2	0	0	0	2	
Leach, Jay	(United States)	D	2007–2008	2	0	0	0	2	—	—	—	—	—	
Lecavalier, Vincent^{†}	(Canada)	C	1998–2013	1037	383	491	874	746	63	24	28	52	80	Captain, 2000–2001, 2008–2013; Ret #4; SC — 2004; Maurice "Rocket" Richard Trophy — 2007; King Clancy Memorial Trophy — 2008; NHL Foundation Player Award — 2008
Ledyard, Grant	(Canada)	D	2000–2002	67	3	5	8	24	—	—	—	—	—	
Lee, Brian	(United States)	D	2011–2013	42	0	8	8	24	—	—	—	—	—	
Lessard, Junior	(Canada)	RW	2007–2008	19	1	1	2	9	—	—	—	—	—	
Lilleberg, Emil*	(Norway)	D	2023–2026	163	5	31	36	182	17	0	1	1	10	
LiPuma, Chris	(United States)	D	1992–1996	64	0	9	9	124	—	—	—	—	—	
Lukowich, Brad^{†}	(Canada)	D	2002–2004; 2007–2008	208	7	34	41	90	27	0	3	3	8	SC — 2004
Lundin, Mike	(United States)	D	2007–2011	224	4	29	33	50	18	0	2	2	2	
Lundmark, Simon*	(Sweden)	D	2025–2026	1	0	0	0	0	—	—	—	—	—	
MacDonald, Craig	(Canada)	C	2007–2008	65	2	9	11	16	—	—	—	—	—	
Malik, Marek	(Czech Republic)	D	2008–2009	42	0	5	5	36	—	—	—	—	—	
Mallette, Troy	(Canada)	LW	1997–1998	3	0	0	0	7	—	—	—	—	—	
Malone, Ryan	(United States)	LW	2008–2014	342	92	102	201	388	18	3	3	6	24	
Maltais, Steve	(Canada)	LW	1992–1993	63	7	13	20	35	—	—	—	—	—	
Mara, Paul	(United States)	D	1998–2001	101	14	22	36	113	—	—	—	—	—	
Marchessault, Jonathan	(Canada)	C	2014–2016	47	8	11	19	17	7	0	1	1	6	
Marchment, Bryan	(Canada)	D	1997–1998	22	2	4	6	43	—	—	—	—	—	
Maroon, Patrick^{†}	(United States)	LW	2019–2023	280	29	53	82	415	77	7	10	17	117	SC — 2020, 2021
Martel, Danick	(Canada)	LW	2018–2019	9	0	2	2	8	—	—	—	—	—	
Martins, Steve	(Canada)	C	1999–2001	77	6	8	14	50	—	—	—	—	—	
McAlpine, Chris	(United States)	D	1999–2000	10	1	1	2	10	—	—	—	—	—	
McBain, Mike	(Canada)	D	1997–1999	64	0	7	7	22	—	—	—	—	—	
McCarthy, Sandy	(Canada)	RW	1997–1999	81	5	12	17	206	—	—	—	—	—	
McDonagh, Ryan^{†}*	(United States)	D	2017–2022; 2024–2026	397	30	121	151	111	101	2	25	27	52	SC — 2020, 2021
McDougall, Bill	(Canada)	C	1993–1994	22	3	3	6	8	—	—	—	—	—	
McGinn, Tye	(Canada)	LW	2015–2016	2	0	0	0	0	—	—	—	—	—	
McKegg, Greg	(Canada)	LW	2016–2017	15	0	1	1	11	—	—	—	—	—	
McRae, Basil	(Canada)	LW	1992–1993	14	2	3	5	71	—	—	—	—	—	
Melichar, Josef	(Czech Republic)	D	2008–2009	24	0	5	5	29	—	—	—	—	—	
Merela, Waltteri	(Finland)	C	2023–2024	19	1	0	1	0	—	—	—	—	—	
Meszaros, Andrej	(Slovakia)	D	2008–2010	133	8	25	33	86	—	—	—	—	—	
Metropolit, Glen	(Canada)	C	2001–2002	2	0	0	0	0	—	—	—	—	—	
Mihalik, Vladimir	(Slovakia)	D	2008–2010	15	0	3	3	8	—	—	—	—	—	
Mikkelson, Brendan	(Canada)	D	2011–2013	45	1	3	4	19	—	—	—	—	—	
Millar, Craig	(Canada)	D	2000–2001	16	1	1	2	10	—	—	—	—	—	
Miller, Drew	(United States)	RW	2009–2010	14	0	0	0	2	—	—	—	—	—	
Miller, J. T.	(United States)	C/RW	2017–2019	93	23	40	63	42	21	2	8	10	15	
Milley, Norm	(Canada)	RW	2005–2006	14	2	1	3	4	—	—	—	—	—	
Modin, Fredrik^{†}	(Sweden)	LW	1999–2006	445	145	141	286	224	39	10	11	21	34	SC — 2004
Mongeau, Michel	(Canada)	C	1992–1993	4	1	1	2	2	—	—	—	—	—	
Moore, Dominic	(Canada)	C	2010–2012	133	22	29	51	100	18	3	8	11	18	
Morrow, Brenden	(Canada)	LW	2014–2015	70	3	5	8	64	24	0	0	0	0	
Moser, J.J.*	(Switzerland)	D	2024–2026	133	9	34	43	91	12	1	2	3	2	
Motte, Tyler	(United States)	C	2023–2024	69	6	3	9	28	5	0	1	1	2	
Muir, Bryan	(Canada)	D	1999–2001	40	1	4	5	47	—	—	—	—	—	
Murphy, Cory	(Canada)	D	2008–2009	25	5	10	15	12	—	—	—	—	—	
Myers, Philippe	(Canada)	D	2022–2024	16	1	2	3	6	—	—	—	—	—	
Myhres, Brantt	(Canada)	RW	1994–1995; 1996–1997	62	5	1	6	217	—	—	—	—	—	
Namestnikov, Vladislav	(Russia)	C	2013–2018; 2022–2023	320	59	79	138	147	29	1	3	4	4	
Nash, Riley	(Canada)	C	2021–2022	10	0	0	0	2	8	0	0	0	2	
Nazarov, Andrei	(Russia)	LW	1997–1999	40	3	1	4	101	—	—	—	—	—	
Neckar, Stan^{†}	(Czech Republic)	D	2000–2004	163	2	13	15	75	9	0	2	2	2	SC — 2004
Nesterov, Nikita	(Russia)	D	2014–2017	119	9	19	28	77	26	1	6	7	17	
Niskala, Janne	(Finland)	D	2008–2009	6	1	2	3	6	—	—	—	—	—	
Norton, Jeff	(United States)	D	1996–1998	50	4	11	15	42	—	—	—	—	—	
Nylander, Michael	(Sweden)	C	1998–2000	35	3	9	12	10	—	—	—	—	—	
O'Brien, Doug	(Canada)	D	2005–2006	5	0	0	0	2	—	—	—	—	—	
O'Brien, Shane	(Canada)	D	2006–2009	96	4	19	23	190	6	0	0	0	12	
Oberg, Even	(Canada)	D	2011–2012	3	0	0	0	0	—	—	—	—	—	
Ohlund, Mattias	(Sweden)	D	2009–2011	139	0	18	18	129	18	1	2	3	8	
Olvestad, Jimmie	(Sweden)	LW	2001–2003	111	3	14	17	40	—	—	—	—	—	
Osborne, Keith	(Canada)	RW	1992–1993	11	1	1	2	8	—	—	—	—	—	
Ouellet, Michel	(Canada)	RW	2007–2008	64	17	19	36	12	—	—	—	—	—	
Palat, Ondrej^{†}	(Czech Republic)	LW	2012–2022	628	143	280	423	177	138	48	46	94	60	SC — 2020, 2021
Panik, Richard	(Slovakia)	RW	2012–2014	75	8	14	28	25	2	0	0	0	4	
Paquette, Cedric^{†}	(Canada)	C	2013–2020	377	47	38	85	345	91	5	7	12	121	SC — 2020
Parrish, Mark	(United States)	RW	2009–2010	16	0	2	2	4	—	—	—	—	—	
Paul, Nick*	(Canada)	LW	2021–2026	310	75	73	148	139	45	10	4	14	20	
Peca, Matthew	(Canada)	C	2016–2018	20	3	3	5	2	—	—	—	—	—	
Pelletier, Jakob*	(Canada)	LW	2025–2026	5	0	0	0	0	—	—	—	—	—	
Perbix, Nick	(United States)	D	2022–2025	220	13	50	63	52	13	0	4	4	6	
Perrin, Eric^{†}	(Canada)	C	2003–2004; 2006–2007	86	13	23	36	30	18	1	2	3	8	SC — 2004
Perry, Corey	(Canada)	RW	2021–2023	163	31	34	65	161	36	8	8	16	37	
Peterson, Brent	(Canada)	LW	1996–1999	56	9	1	10	6	—	—	—	—	—	
Petiot, Richard	(Canada)	D	2008–2009	11	0	3	3	21	—	—	—	—	—	
Petit, Michel	(Canada)	D	1995–1996	45	4	7	11	108	6	0	0	0	20	
Petrovicky, Robert	(Slovakia)	C	1998–2000	71	10	14	24	20	—	—	—	—	—	
Pettinger, Matt	(Canada)	LW	2008–2009	59	8	7	15	24	—	—	—	—	—	
Picard, Alexandre	(Canada)	D	2007–2008	20	3	3	6	8	—	—	—	—	—	
Plavsic, Adrien	(Canada)	D	1994–1996	22	3	3	6	10	—	—	—	—	—	
Poeshek, Rudy	(Canada)	D	1993–1997	213	5	16	21	418	3	0	0	0	12	
Point, Brayden^{†}*	(Canada)	C	2016–2026	720	324	361	685	163	99	45	45	90	47	SC — 2020, 2021
Posmyk, Marek	(Czech Republic)	D	1999–2001	19	1	2	3	20	—	—	—	—	—	
Poulin, Patrick	(Canada)	LW	1995–1998	125	14	22	36	75	2	0	0	0	0	
Pouliot, Benoit	(Canada)	LW	2012–2013	34	8	12	20	15	—	—	—	—	—	
Pouliot, Marc-Antoine	(Canada)	C	2010–2011	3	0	0	0	0	—	—	—	—	—	
Pratt, Nolan^{†}	(Canada)	D	2001–2007	334	3	29	32	232	35	0	1	1	20	SC — 2004
Primeau, Wayne	(Canada)	C	1999–2001	64	4	16	20	102	—	—	—	—	—	
Prospal, Vaclav	(Czech Republic)	C	2001–2003; 2005–2008; 2008–2009	468	127	244	371	268	22	5	8	13	12	
Purcell, Teddy	(Canada)	RW	2009–2014	310	67	136	203	58	22	7	11	18	2	
Pyatt, Tom	(Canada)	C	2011–2014	144	23	19	42	24	1	0	0	0	0	
Quick, Kevin	(United States)	D	2008–2009	6	0	1	1	0	—	—	—	—	—	
Racine, Yves	(Canada)	D	1997–1998	60	0	8	8	41	—	—	—	—	—	
Raddysh, Darren*	(Canada)	D	2021–2026	249	35	108	143	111	20	2	2	4	8	
Raddysh, Taylor	(Canada)	RW	2021–2022	53	5	7	12	8	—	—	—	—	—	
Raglan, Herb	(Canada)	RW	1992–1993	2	0	0	0	0	—	—	—	—	—	
Ramage, Rob	(Canada)	D	1992–1993	66	5	12	17	138	—	—	—	—	—	
Ranger, Paul	(Canada)	D	2005–2010	270	18	74	92	218	11	2	5	7	4	
Recchi, Mark^{†}	(Canada)	RW	2008–2009	62	13	32	45	20	—	—	—	—	—	HHOF — 2017
Reekie, Joe	(Canada)	D	1992–1994	115	3	22	25	196	—	—	—	—	—	
Reid, Darren	(Canada)	RW	2005–2006	7	0	1	1	0	—	—	—	—	—	
Renberg, Mikael	(Sweden)	RW	1997–1999	88	20	30	50	38	—	—	—	—	—	Captain, 1997–1998
Richard, Tanner	(Switzerland)	C	2016–2017	3	0	0	0	2	—	—	—	—	—	
Richards, Brad^{†}	(Canada)	C	2000–2008	552	150	339	489	133	45	18	29	47	28	SC — 2004; Lady Byng Trophy — 2004; Conn Smythe Trophy — 2004
Richardson, Luke	(Canada)	D	2006–2007	27	0	3	3	16	—	—	—	—	—	
Richer, Stephane	(Canada)	D	1992–1993	3	0	0	0	0	—	—	—	—	—	
Richer, Stephane	(Canada)	RW	1997–2000	110	28	37	65	62	—	—	—	—	—	
Ritola, Mattias	(Sweden)	C	2010–2012	36	4	4	8	17	1	0	0	0	0	
Rivers, Shawn	(Canada)	D	1992–1993	4	0	2	2	2	—	—	—	—	—	
Roberts, Gary	(Canada)	LW	2008–2009	30	4	3	7	27	—	—	—	—	—	
Rochefort, Normand	(Canada)	D	1993–1994	6	0	0	0	10	—	—	—	—	—	
Rominski, Dale	(United States)	RW	1999–2000	3	0	1	1	2	—	—	—	—	—	
Roy, Andre^{†}	(Canada)	RW	2001–2004; 2006–2008	218	17	14	31	484	32	1	3	4	98	SC — 2004
Roy, Mathieu	(Canada)	D	2010–2013	5	0	0	0	2	—	—	—	—	—	
Royer, Gaetan	(Canada)	RW	2001–2002	3	0	0	0	2	—	—	—	—	—	
Ruff, Jason	(Canada)	LW	1992–1994	7	1	2	3	2	—	—	—	—	—	
Rumble, Darren^{†}	(Canada)	D	2002–2004	24	0	0	0	8	—	—	—	—	—	SC — 2004
Rutta, Jan^{†}	(Czech Republic)	D	2018–2022	158	4	31	35	87	49	3	8	11	37	SC — 2020, 2021
Sabourin, Scott*	(Canada)	RW	2025–2026	26	1	4	5	89	2	0	0	0	2	
Salo, Sami	(Finland)	D	2012–2014	117	6	28	34	34	2	0	0	0	0	
Samuelsson, Kjell	(Sweden)	D	1998–1999	46	1	4	5	38	—	—	—	—	—	
Santini, Steven*	(United States)	D	2024–2026	13	0	1	1	2	—	—	—	—	—	
Sarich, Cory^{†}	(Canada)	D	1999–2007	490	10	75	85	554	45	0	5	5	2	SC — 2004
Savard, David^{†}	(Canada)	D	2020–2021	14	0	0	0	0	20	0	5	5	6	SC — 2021
Savard, Denis^{†}	(Canada)	C	1993–1995	105	24	39	63	116	—	—	—	—	—	HHOF — 2000
Schenn, Luke^{†}	(Canada)	D	2019–2021	63	3	4	7	74	19	1	2	3	16	SC — 2020, 2021
Segal, Brandon	(Canada)	RW	2008–2012	12	0	0	0	4	—	—	—	—	—	
Selivanov, Alexander	(Russia)	RW	1994–1999	304	78	77	155	271	6	2	2	4	6	
Semak, Alexander	(Russia)	C	1994–1995	22	5	5	10	12	—	—	—	—	—	
Semenov, Anatoli	(Russia)	C	1992–1993	13	2	3	5	4	—	—	—	—	—	
Sergachev, Mikhail^{†}	(Russia)	D	2017–2024	471	48	209	257	282	100	9	25	34	90	SC — 2020, 2021
Shannon, Ryan	(United States)	RW	2011–2012	45	4	8	12	10	—	—	—	—	—	
Shattenkirk, Kevin^{†}	(United States)	D	2019–2020	70	8	26	34	38	25	3	10	13	6	SC — 2020
Shaw, David	(Canada)	D	1995–1998	137	2	23	25	148	6	0	1	1	4	
Sheary, Conor	(United States)	LW	2023–2025	62	4	11	15	16	—	—	—	—	—	
Shevalier, Jeff	(Canada)	LW	1999–2000	5	0	0	0	2	—	—	—	—	—	
Sillinger, Mike	(Canada)	C	1998–2000	121	27	27	54	114	—	—	—	—	—	
Simard, Martin	(Canada)	RW	1992–1993	7	0	0	0	11	—	—	—	—	—	
Simpson, Reid	(Canada)	LW	1999–2000	26	1	0	1	103	—	—	—	—	—	
Skopintsev, Andrei	(Russia)	D	1998–2000	23	1	1	2	16	—	—	—	—	—	
Smaby, Matt	(United States)	D	2007–2011	122	0	6	6	106	—	—	—	—	—	
Smith, Gemel	(Canada)	C	2019–2021	8	0	4	4	15	—	—	—	—	—	
Smith, Trevor	(Canada)	C	2011–2012	16	2	3	5	4	—	—	—	—	—	
Smolenak, Radek	(Czech Republic)	LW	2008–2009	6	0	1	1	10	—	—	—	—	—	
Spring, Corey	(Canada)	C	1997–1999	16	1	1	2	12	—	—	—	—	—	
St. Louis, Martin^{†}	(Canada)	RW	2000–2014	972	365	588	953	258	63	33	35	68	28	Captain, 2013–2014; Ret # 26; SC — 2004; HHOF — 2018; Hart Memorial Trophy — 2004; Art Ross Trophy — 2004, 2013; NHL Plus-Minus Award — 2004; Lester B. Pearson Award — 2004; Lady Byng Trophy — 2010, 2011, 2013
Stamkos, Steven^{†}	(Canada)	C	2008–2024	1082	555	582	1137	631	128	50	51	101	78	Captain, 2014–2024; SC — 2020, 2021; Maurice "Rocket" Richard Trophy — 2010, 2012; Mark Messier Leadership Award — 2023
Stephens, Mitchell^{†}	(Canada)	C	2019–2021	44	3	4	7	10	7	1	0	1	2	SC — 2020
Stevenson, Shayne	(Canada)	RW	1992–1993	8	0	1	1	7	—	—	—	—	—	
Stewart, Karl	(Canada)	LW	2006–2008	16	0	0	0	4	—	—	—	—	—	
Stillman, Cory^{†}	(Canada)	LW	2003–2004	81	25	55	80	36	21	2	5	7	15	SC — 2004
Stralman, Anton	(Sweden)	D	2014–2019	355	29	101	130	92	49	3	12	15	18	
Sustr, Andrej	(Czech Republic)	D	2012–2018; 2021–2022	333	11	53	64	147	46	2	3	5	36	
Sutter, Rich	(Canada)	RW	1994–1995	4	0	0	0	0	—	—	—	—	—	
Svejkovsky, Jaroslav	(Czech Republic)	RW	1999–2000	29	5	5	10	28	—	—	—	—	—	
Svitov, Alexander	(Russia)	C	2002–2004	74	4	7	11	62	7	0	0	0	6	
Svoboda, Petr	(Czech Republic)	D	1998–2001	123	4	42	46	264	—	—	—	—	—	
Sydor, Darryl^{†}	(Canada)	D	2003–2006	111	5	25	30	36	28	0	7	7	9	SC — 2004
Sykora, Michal	(Czech Republic)	D	1998–1999	10	1	2	3	0	—	—	—	—	—	
Szczechura, Paul	(Canada)	C	2008–2010	83	9	7	16	30	—	—	—	—	—	
Taglianetti, Peter	(United States)	D	1992–1993	61	1	8	9	150	—	—	—	—	—	
Tanguay, Alex	(Canada)	LW	2009–2010	80	10	27	37	32	—	—	—	—	—	
Taormina, Matt	(United States)	D	2012–2014; 2015–2016	12	0	0	0	0	3	0	0	0	0	
Tarnasky, Nick	(Canada)	C	2005–2008	169	11	9	20	162	6	0	0	0	10	
Taylor, Tim^{†}	(Canada)	C	2001–2008	365	23	38	61	126	45	2	4	6	39	Captain, 2006–2008; SC — 2004
Thomas, Ben	(Canada)	D	2020–2021	5	0	0	0	0	—	—	—	—	—	
Thompson, Jack	(Canada)	D	2023–2024	1	0	0	0	0	—	—	—	—	—	
Thompson, Nate	(United States)	C	2009–2014	305	36	39	75	111	22	1	3	4	4	
Tobler, Ryan	(Canada)	LW	2001–2002	4	0	0	0	5	—	—	—	—	—	
Toms, Jeff	(Canada)	LW	1995–1998	48	3	10	13	17	—	—	—	—	—	
Torgayev, Pavel	(Russia)	D	1999–2000	5	0	2	2	2	—	—	—	—	—	
Tucker, Darcy	(Canada)	RW	1997–2000	167	41	50	91	373	—	—	—	—	—	
Tucker, John	(Canada)	RW	1992–1996	253	49	82	131	129	2	0	0	0	2	
Tyrell, Dana	(Canada)	C	2010–2014	132	7	17	24	26	7	0	0	0	2	
Ulanov, Igor	(Russia)	D	1995–1998	115	5	15	20	217	5	0	0	0	15	
Veilleux, Stephane	(Canada)	LW	2009–2010	77	3	6	9	48	—	—	—	—	—	
Verhaeghe, Carter^{†}	(Canada)	C	2019–2020	52	9	4	13	8	8	0	2	2	2	SC — 2020
Vermin, Joel	(Switzerland)	RW	2015–2017	24	0	4	4	4	—	—	—	—	—	
Vernace, Michael	(Canada)	D	2010–2011	10	0	1	1	2	—	—	—	—	—	
Volkov, Alexander^{†}	(Russia)	LW	2019–2021	28	3	3	6	10	1	0	0	0	0	SC — 2020
Vrbata, Radim	(Czech Republic)	RW	2008–2009	18	3	3	6	8	—	—	—	—	—	
Vujtek, Vladimir	(Czech Republic)	LW	1997–1998	30	2	4	6	16	—	—	—	—	—	
Vukota, Mick	(Canada)	RW	1997–1998	42	1	0	1	116	—	—	—	—	—	
Walcott, Daniel	(Canada)	LW	2020–2021	1	0	0	0	5	—	—	—	—	—	
Walker, Matt	(Canada)	D	2009–2010	66	2	3	5	90	—	—	—	—	—	
Wallace, Tim	(United States)	RW	2011–2012	18	3	5	8	10	—	—	—	—	—	
Wanvig, Kyle	(Canada)	RW	2006–2008	11	1	0	1	7	—	—	—	—	—	
Ward, Jason	(Canada)	RW	2006–2010	97	12	10	22	54	6	0	1	1	6	
Warriner, Todd	(Canada)	LW	1999–2001	119	21	24	45	80	—	—	—	—	—	
Watson, Austin	(United States)	LW	2023–2024	33	2	2	4	93	—	—	—	—	—	
Welch, Noah	(United States)	D	2008–2009	17	0	0	0	14	—	—	—	—	—	
Wells, Jay	(Canada)	D	1996–1997	21	0	0	0	13	—	—	—	—	—	
Wiemer, Jason	(Canada)	C	1994–1998	232	27	27	54	391	6	1	0	1	28	
Wilkie, David	(United States)	D	1997–1999	75	2	12	14	86	—	—	—	—	—	
Willis, Shane	(Canada)	RW	2001–2002; 2003–2004	33	4	9	13	8	—	—	—	—	—	
Wishart, Ty	(Canada)	D	2008–2009	5	0	1	1	0	—	—	—	—	—	
Witkowski, Luke	(United States)	D/RW	2014–2017; 2019–2020	66	1	6	7	71	2	0	0	0	0	
Wolanin, Craig	(United States)	D	1996–1997	15	0	0	0	8	—	—	—	—	—	
Wright, James	(Canada)	C	2009–2011	49	2	3	5	18	—	—	—	—	—	
Wyman, J. T.	(United States)	RW	2011–2013	41	2	9	11	8	—	—	—	—	—	
Ylonen, Juha	(Finland)	C	2001–2002	65	3	10	13	8	—	—	—	—	—	
Ysebaert, Paul	(Canada)	LW	1994–1999	215	42	66	108	5	0	0	0	0	0	Captain, 1995–1997
Zamuner, Rob	(Canada)	LW	1992–1999	475	84	116	200	323	6	2	3	5	10	Captain, 1998–1999
Ziegler, Thomas	(Switzerland)	C	2000–2001	5	0	0	0	0	—	—	—	—	—	
Zyuzin, Andrei	(Russia)	D	1999–2002	107	6	27	33	115	—	—	—	—	—	
