= 1993 NHL supplemental draft =

Player selection draft

General information
- Date(s): June 25, 1993

Overview
- 10 total selections in 1 rounds
- First selection: (Canada) Eric Flinton (Ottawa Senators)

The 1993 NHL supplemental draft was the eighth NHL supplemental draft. It was held on June 25, 1993. It was limited to the eight teams that missed the 1993 Stanley Cup playoffs and the expansion Mighty Ducks of Anaheim and Florida Panthers.

== Selections ==
Pick #	Player	Nationality	NHL team	College (league)
1	Eric Flinton (LW)	Canada	Ottawa Senators	University of New Hampshire (Hockey East)
2	Dean Sylvester (RW)	United States	San Jose Sharks	Kent State University (CCHA)
3	Brent Peterson (LW)	Canada	Tampa Bay Lightning	Michigan Technological University (WCHA)
4	Chris Imes (D)	United States	Florida Panthers	University of Maine (Hockey East)
5	Patrick Thompson (D)	Canada	Mighty Ducks of Anaheim	Brown University (ECAC)
6	Kent Fearns (D)	Canada	Hartford Whalers	Colorado College (WCHA)
7	Brett Abel (G)	United States	Edmonton Oilers	University of New Hampshire (Hockey East)
8	Wayne Strachan (RW)	Canada	New York Rangers	Lake Superior State University (CCHA)
9	Jacques Joubert (C)	United States	Dallas Stars	Boston University (Hockey East)
10	Shannon Finn (D)	Canada	Philadelphia Flyers	University of Illinois at Chicago (CCHA)

== See also ==
- 1993 NHL entry draft
- 1993 NHL expansion draft
- 1993–94 NHL season
- List of NHL players
