= Ron Finn =

Canadian ice hockey official

- Born: December 1, 1940 (age 85) Toronto, Ontario, Canada
- Position: Linesman

Ron Finn (born December 1, 1940, in Toronto, Ontario) is a Canadian retired National Hockey League linesman. His career started in 1969 and ended in 2000. During his career, he officiated 2,373 regular season games and two All-Star games as well as Rendez-vous '87, and four Canada Cups. He worked twelve Stanley Cup Finals from 1979 to 1990. His uniform number is #26 and #77 when the NHL reinstated issuing numbers to officials in 1995 (it was discontinued in 1977). He had two sons, Sean and Shannon, who also played.

== General references ==
- ISBN 1-880141-43-4 The National Hockey League Official Guide & Record Book/1993-94
