= Shannon Finn =

Canadian ice hockey player

- Born: January 25, 1972 (age 54) Toronto, Ontario, Canada
- Height: 6 ft 2 in (188 cm)
- Weight: 195 lb (88 kg; 13 st 13 lb)
- Position: Defence
- Shot: Left
- Played for: Minnesota Moose; Peoria Rivermen; Fort Wayne Komets; Utah Grizzlies; Milwaukee Admirals; Hershey Bears; Houston Aeros; Detroit Vipers
- National team: Canada
- NHL draft: 1993 NHL Supplemental Draft; Philadelphia Flyers
- Playing career: 1995–2000

Shannon Finn (born January 25, 1972) is a Canadian former professional ice hockey player who played in the International Hockey League and American Hockey League. He also played for the Minnesota Moose, Peoria Rivermen, Fort Wayne Komets, Utah Grizzlies, Milwaukee Admirals, Hershey Bears, Houston Aeros, and Detroit Vipers. He was drafted in the 1993 NHL Supplemental Draft by the Philadelphia Flyers. He is the son of former NHL linesman Ron Finn.

== Career statistics ==
			Regular season					Playoffs
Season	Team	League	GP	G	A	Pts	PIM	GP	G	A	Pts	PIM
1991–92	University of Illinois Chicago	NCAA	36	6	14	20	80	—	—	—	—	—
1992–93	University of Illinois Chicago	NCAA	36	6	13	19	48	—	—	—	—	—
1993–94	University of Illinois Chicago	NCAA	39	5	22	27	42	—	—	—	—	—
1994–95	University of Illinois Chicago	NCAA	37	9	23	32	40	—	—	—	—	—
1994–95	Minnesota Moose	IHL	3	0	2	2	6	—	—	—	—	—
1995–96	Peoria Rivermen	IHL	67	4	22	26	75	12	1	1	2	10
1996–97	Fort Wayne Komets	IHL	1	0	1	1	0	—	—	—	—	—
1996–97	Utah Grizzlies	IHL	2	0	2	2	0	—	—	—	—	—
1996–97	Milwaukee Admirals	IHL	70	7	8	15	83	3	1	1	2	2
1997–98	Milwaukee Admirals	IHL	74	5	28	33	108	10	4	5	9	10
1998–99	Hershey Bears	AHL	42	4	15	19	57	—	—	—	—	—
1998–99	Milwaukee Admirals	IHL	35	6	11	17	22	2	0	0	0	6
1999–00	Houston Aeros	IHL	8	0	0	0	6	—	—	—	—	—
1999–00	Detroit Vipers	IHL	28	2	0	2	48	—	—	—	—	—
AHL totals			42	4	15	19	57	—	—	—	—	—
IHL totals			288	24	74	98	348	27	6	7	13	28
