= Dean Sylvester =

American ice hockey player

- Born: December 30, 1972 (age 53) Weymouth, Massachusetts, U.S.
- Height: 6 ft 2 in (188 cm)
- Weight: 200 lb (91 kg; 14 st 4 lb)
- Position: Right wing
- Shot: Right
- Played for: Buffalo Sabres; Atlanta Thrashers
- NHL draft: 1993 NHL Supplemental Draft; San Jose Sharks
- Playing career: 1995–2001

Dean M. Sylvester (born December 30, 1972) is an American former professional ice hockey player who played in the National Hockey League (NHL).

== Career ==
Sylverster was drafted by the San Jose Sharks in the 1993 NHL Supplemental Draft and spent three seasons in the International Hockey League with the Kansas City Blades, he also played in the East Coast Hockey League for the Mobile Mysticks. In 1998, he signed with the Buffalo Sabres and played one game for the team before being traded to the new expansion team, the Atlanta Thrashers. In the 1999–2000 NHL season, Sylvester scored 16 goals and 26 points in 52 games, placing third and fifth on the Thrashers in goals and points respectively. After one more season with the Thrashers, Sylvester retired from hockey.

== Career statistics ==
			Regular season					Playoffs
Season	Team	League	GP	G	A	Pts	PIM	GP	G	A	Pts	PIM
1990–91	Boston College High School	HS-MA	18	19	13	32	—	—	—	—	—	—
1991–92	Kent State University	NCAA	31	7	21	28	10	—	—	—	—	—
1992–93	Kent State University	NCAA	38	33	20	53	28	—	—	—	—	—
1993–94	Kent State University	NCAA	39	22	24	46	28	—	—	—	—	—
1994–95	Michigan State University	CCHA	40	15	15	30	38	—	—	—	—	—
1995–96	Mobile Mysticks	ECHL	44	24	27	51	35	—	—	—	—	—
1995–96	Kansas City Blades	IHL	36	11	10	21	15	4	0	0	0	2
1996–97	Kansas City Blades	IHL	77	23	22	45	47	3	1	1	2	0
1997–98	Kansas City Blades	IHL	77	33	20	53	63	11	5	2	7	4
1998–99	Buffalo Sabres	NHL	1	0	0	0	0	4	0	0	0	2
1998–99	Rochester Americans	AHL	76	35	30	65	46	18	12	5	17	8
1999–00	Orlando Solar Bears	IHL	16	4	3	7	43	—	—	—	—	—
1999–00	Atlanta Thrashers	NHL	52	16	10	26	24	—	—	—	—	—
2000–01	Orlando Solar Bears	IHL	27	9	9	18	20	9	0	1	1	6
2000–01	Atlanta Thrashers	NHL	43	5	6	11	8	—	—	—	—	—
IHL totals			233	80	64	144	188	27	6	4	10	12
NHL totals			96	21	16	37	32	4	0	0	0	2
