= Brent Peterson (ice hockey, born 1972) =

Canadian ice hockey player

- Born: July 20, 1972 (age 54) Calgary, Alberta, Canada
- Height: 6 ft 3 in (191 cm)
- Weight: 200 lb (91 kg; 14 st 4 lb)
- Position: Left wing
- Shot: Left
- Played for: Tampa Bay Lightning
- NHL draft: 1993 NHL Supplemental Draft; Tampa Bay Lightning
- Playing career: 1995–2004

Brent Peterson (born July 20, 1972) is a Canadian former professional ice hockey player. Peterson, a left winger, played in 56 National Hockey League (NHL) games over three seasons with the Tampa Bay Lightning, scoring nine goals and assisting on one. After his three NHL seasons, Peterson spent four seasons in Europe, playing for teams in Switzerland and Germany.

== Early years ==
Peterson joined the United States Hockey League's Thunder Bay Flyers for the 1990–91 season, at the age of eighteen. In 48 regular season games, he recorded 27 goals and 40 assists, and added eight goals and nine assists in 10 playoff games. In 1991–92, Peterson began playing college hockey with the Western Collegiate Hockey Association's Michigan Tech Huskies. After scoring 20 points in the 1992–93 season, Peterson increased his point total to 42 in 1993–94. In 1994–95, he scored 25 goals and had 21 assists; both totals were the highest of his college career, as was his 46 points. He was named Michigan Tech's most valuable player for his performance that season. Peterson's statistical production declined slightly in his last college season, 1995–96, as he posted 20 goals and 16 assists. In one October 1995 game against Northern Michigan, he had four goals. For his college career, Peterson had 80 goals and 64 assists in 158 games.

== Professional career ==
In the 1993 NHL Supplemental Draft, Peterson was chosen as the third overall selection by the Tampa Bay Lightning. Following the end of his college career, he was sent to the Atlanta Knights, the Lightning's affiliate in the minor league International Hockey League (IHL). With the Knights, Peterson had 28 points in 69 regular season games, but went scoreless in three playoff games. In 1996–97, Peterson spent most of his playing time with the American Hockey League's Adirondack Red Wings, for whom he scored 45 points in the regular season and four in the playoffs. During that season, he made his NHL debut with the Lightning, and scored two goals in 17 games. The 1997–98 season saw Peterson again split time between the NHL and minor league hockey; he tallied five goals in 19 games for the Lightning, and 20 goals and 39 assists for the IHL's Milwaukee Admirals. He played his final NHL games in the 1998–99 season, when he posted two goals and his only NHL assist in 20 games for the Lightning. In addition, he had 13 goals and 12 assists in 35 games for two IHL clubs.

In March 1999, the Lightning traded Peterson to the Pittsburgh Penguins organization. He became a free agent after the season, and the Nashville Predators signed him. During the 1999–00 season, Peterson spent the entire campaign with the Admirals, the Predators' IHL affiliate, scoring 32 points in the regular season and five in the playoffs. Peterson moved to Europe for the 2000–01 season, beginning the season with the SCL Tigers in Switzerland's National League A. In 10 games, he recorded three goals and two assists before moving to Germany to play for the Deutsche Eishockey Liga's Kassel Huskies. Peterson finished 2000–01 season with the Tigers and spent three more seasons with the club; his best statistical season in Germany was 2002–03, when he had 25 regular season points, along with three in the playoffs.

== Post-hockey career ==
In 2016, Peterson was inducted into Michigan Tech's Sports Hall of Fame. As of 2017, he works as a financial analyst.

== Career statistics ==
=== Regular season and playoffs ===
			Regular season					Playoffs
Season	Team	League	GP	G	A	Pts	PIM	GP	G	A	Pts	PIM
1990–91	Thunder Bay Flyers	USHL	48	27	40	67	10	—	—	—	—	—
1991–92	Michigan Tech	WCHA	39	11	9	20	18	—	—	—	—	—
1992–93	Michigan Tech	WCHA	37	24	18	42	32	—	—	—	—	—
1993–94	Michigan Tech	WCHA	43	25	21	46	30	—	—	—	—	—
1994–95	Michigan Tech	WCHA	39	20	16	36	27	—	—	—	—	—
1995–96	Atlanta Knights	IHL	69	9	19	28	33	3	0	0	0	0
1996–97	Adirondack Red Wings	AHL	52	22	23	45	56	4	3	1	4	2
1996–97	Tampa Bay Lightning	NHL	17	2	0	2	4	—	—	—	—	—
1997–98	Milwaukee Admirals	IHL	63	20	39	59	48	8	5	3	8	22
1997–98	Tampa Bay Lightning	NHL	19	5	0	5	2	—	—	—	—	—
1998–99	Cleveland Lumberjacks	IHL	18	6	7	13	31	—	—	—	—	—
1998–99	Grand Rapids Griffins	IHL	17	7	5	12	14	—	—	—	—	—
1998–99	Tampa Bay Lightning	NHL	20	2	1	3	0	—	—	—	—	—
1999–00	Milwaukee Admirals	IHL	66	8	24	32	62	3	3	2	5	4
2000–01	Langnau Tigers	NLA	10	3	2	5	8	—	—	—	—	—
2000–01	Kassel Huskies	DEL	28	7	14	21	40	8	2	2	4	8
2001–02	Kassel Huskies	DEL	51	8	15	23	46	7	1	2	3	10
2002–03	Kassel Huskies	DEL	49	10	15	25	46	7	2	1	3	16
2003–04	Kassel Huskies	DEL	50	10	9	19	46	—	—	—	—	—
NHL totals			56	9	1	10	6	—	—	—	—	—
