= 2009–10 Dallas Stars season =

National Hockey League team season

2009–10 Dallas Stars
- Division: 5th place Pacific
- Conference: 12th place Western
- 2009–10 record: 37–31–14
- Home record: 23–11–7
- Road record: 14–20–7
- Goals for: 237
- Goals against: 254

Team information
- General manager: Joe Nieuwendyk
- Coach: Marc Crawford
- Captain: Brenden Morrow
- Alternate captains: Mike Modano; Steve Ott; Brad Richards; Stephane Robidas
- Arena: American Airlines Center

Team leaders
- Goals: Loui Eriksson (29)
- Assists: Brad Richards (67)
- Points: Brad Richards (91)
- Penalty minutes: Steve Ott (153)
- Plus/minus: Mark Fistric (+27)
- Wins: Marty Turco (22)
- Goals against average: Marty Turco (2.72)

The 2009–10 Dallas Stars season was the 43rd season in the National Hockey League. (NHL) franchise that was established on June 5, 1967. The Stars introduce Joe Nieuwendyk as their new general manager, replacing Les Jackson and Brett Hull, who were both reassigned within the organization. On June 11, head coach Dave Tippett was fired and replaced with Marc Crawford.

== Preseason ==
2009 Pre-season Game Log: 4-4–0 (Home: 2–2–0; Road: 2–2–0)
| # | Date | Visitor | Score | Home | OT | Decision | Record | Recap |
| 1 | September 16 | Tampa Bay Lightning | 3 - 4 | Dallas Stars | SO | Turco | 1-0-0 |
| 2 | September 17 | Dallas Stars | 1 - 3 | Colorado Avalanche | | Auld | 1-1-0 |
| 3 | September 19 | Dallas Stars | 4 - 2 | St. Louis Blues | | Turco | 2-1-0 |
| 4 | September 22 | Florida Panthers | 3 - 1 | Dallas Stars | | Krahn | 2-2-0 |
| 5 | September 23 | Dallas Stars | 1 - 4 | Florida Panthers | | Turco | 2-3-0 |
| 6 | September 24 | Colorado Avalanche | 2 - 3 | Dallas Stars | | Auld | 3-3-0 |
| 7 | September 26 | St. Louis Blues | 5 - 0 | Dallas Stars | | Turco | 3-4-0 |
| 8 | September 30 | Dallas Stars | 5 - 1 | Texas Stars (AHL) | | Turco | 4-4-0 |

== Regular season ==
=== Divisional standings ===
Pacific Division
| | | GP | W | L | OTL | GF | GA | Pts |
|---|---|---|---|---|---|---|---|---|
| **1** | **z – San Jose Sharks** | **82** | **51** | **20** | **11** | **264** | **215** | **113** |
| **2** | **Phoenix Coyotes** | **82** | **50** | **25** | **7** | **225** | **202** | **107** |
| **3** | **Los Angeles Kings** | **82** | **46** | **27** | **9** | **241** | **219** | **101** |
| 4 | Anaheim Ducks | 82 | 39 | 32 | 11 | 238 | 251 | 89 |
| 5 | Dallas Stars | 82 | 37 | 31 | 14 | 237 | 254 | 88 |

=== Conference standings ===
Western Conference
| R | | Div | GP | W | L | OTL | GF | GA | Pts |
|---|---|---|---|---|---|---|---|---|---|
| **1** | **z – San Jose Sharks** | **PA** | **82** | **51** | **20** | **11** | **264** | **215** | 113 |
| **2** | **y – Chicago Blackhawks** | **CE** | **82** | **52** | **22** | **8** | **271** | **209** | 112 |
| **3** | **y – Vancouver Canucks** | **NW** | **82** | **49** | **28** | **5** | **272** | **222** | 103 |
| **4** | **Phoenix Coyotes** | **PA** | **82** | **50** | **25** | **7** | **225** | **202** | 107 |
| **5** | **Detroit Red Wings** | **CE** | **82** | **44** | **24** | **14** | **229** | **216** | 102 |
| **6** | **Los Angeles Kings** | **PA** | **82** | **46** | **27** | **9** | **241** | **219** | 101 |
| **7** | **Nashville Predators** | **CE** | **82** | **47** | **29** | **6** | **225** | **225** | 100 |
| **8** | **Colorado Avalanche** | **NW** | **82** | **43** | **30** | **9** | **244** | **233** | 95 |
8.5
| 9 | Calgary Flames | NW | 82 | 40 | 32 | 10 | 225 | 223 | 90 |
| 10 | St. Louis Blues | CE | 82 | 40 | 32 | 10 | 204 | 210 | 90 |
| 11 | Anaheim Ducks | PA | 82 | 39 | 32 | 11 | 238 | 251 | 89 |
| 12 | Dallas Stars | PA | 82 | 37 | 31 | 14 | 237 | 254 | 88 |
| 13 | Minnesota Wild | NW | 82 | 38 | 36 | 8 | 219 | 246 | 84 |
| 14 | Columbus Blue Jackets | CE | 82 | 32 | 35 | 15 | 216 | 259 | 79 |
| 15 | Edmonton Oilers | NW | 82 | 27 | 47 | 8 | 214 | 284 | 62 |

bold – Qualified for playoffs; y – Won division; z – Won conference (and division)

== Schedule and results ==
2009–10 Game Log

October: 6–3–5 (Home: 2–2–2; Road: 4–1–3)
| # | Date | Visitor | Score | Home | OT | Decision | Attendance | Record | Pts | Recap |
| 1 | October 3 | Nashville Predators | 3-2 | Dallas Stars | SO | Turco 0-0-1 | 18,532 | 0-0-1 | 1 |
| 2 | October 6 | Dallas Stars | 4-5 | Edmonton Oilers | SO | Turco 0-0-2 | 16,839 | 0-0-2 | 2 |
| 3 | October 9 | Dallas Stars | 5-2 | Calgary Flames | | Auld 1-0-0 | 19,289 | 1-0-2 | 4 |
| 4 | October 11 | Dallas Stars | 3-4 | Vancouver Canucks | SO | Turco 0-0-3 | 18,810 | 1-0-3 | 5 |
| 5 | October 14 | Nashville Predators | 0-6 | Dallas Stars | | Turco 1-0-3 | 16,365 | 2-0-3 | 7 |
| 6 | October 16 | Boston Bruins | 3-0 | Dallas Stars | | Turco 1-1-3 | 17,811 | 2-1-3 | 7 |
| 7 | October 17 | Dallas Stars | 4-3 | Chicago Blackhawks | | Auld 2-0-0 | 20,424 | 3-1-3 | 9 |
| 8 | October 19 | Los Angeles Kings | 4-1 | Dallas Stars | | Turco 1-2-3 | 16,210 | 3-2-3 | 9 |
| 9 | October 21 | Dallas Stars | 4-2 | Anaheim Ducks | | Turco 2-2-3 | 14,503 | 4-2-3 | 11 |
| 10 | October 22 | Dallas Stars | 4-5 | Los Angeles Kings | OT | Auld 2-0-1 | 15,025 | 4-2-4 | 12 |
| 11 | October 24 | Dallas Stars | 4-1 | St. Louis Blues | | Turco 3-2-3 | 19,150 | 5-2-4 | 14 |
| 12 | October 28 | Toronto Maple Leafs | 3-4 | Dallas Stars | OT | Turco 4-2-3 | 16,302 | 6-2-4 | 16 |
| 13 | October 30 | Florida Panthers | 6-5 | Dallas Stars | SO | Auld 2-0-2 | 16,824 | 6-2-5 | 17 |
| 14 | October 31 | Dallas Stars | 2-4 | Nashville Predators | | Auld 2-1-2 | 12,520 | 6-3-5 | 17 |

November: 6-5–2 (Home: 4–1–2; Road: 2–4–0)
| # | Date | Visitor | Score | Home | OT | Decision | Attendance | Record | Pts | Recap |
| 15 | November 4 | Calgary Flames | 3-2 | Dallas Stars | OT | Turco 4-2-4 | 16,369 | 6-3-6 | 18 |
| 16 | November 6 | Vancouver Canucks | 1-2 | Dallas Stars | | Turco 5-2-4 | 16,839 | 7-3-6 | 20 |
| 17 | November 7 | Dallas Stars | 2-3 | Minnesota Wild | | Auld 2-2-2 | 18,558 | 7-4-6 | 20 |
| 18 | November 12 | Dallas Stars | 3-2 | San Jose Sharks | SO | Turco 6-2-4 | 17,562 | 8-4-6 | 22 |
| 19 | November 14 | Dallas Stars | 2-3 | Phoenix Coyotes | | Turco 6-3-4 | 11,319 | 8-5-6 | 22 |
| 20 | November 18 | Dallas Stars | 3-1 | Detroit Red Wings | | Auld 3-2-2 | 18,112 | 9-5-6 | 24 |
| 21 | November 19 | Columbus Blue Jackets | 4-1 | Dallas Stars | | Turco 6-4-4 | 16,155 | 9-6-6 | 24 |
| 22 | November 21 | New Jersey Devils | 3-5 | Dallas Stars | | Turco 7-4-4 | 17,514 | 10-6-6 | 26 |
| 23 | November 23 | Carolina Hurricanes | 0-2 | Dallas Stars | | Turco 8-4-4 | 16,243 | 11-6-6 | 28 |
| 24 | November 25 | St. Louis Blues | 4-3 | Dallas Stars | SO | Turco 8-4-5 | 18,156 | 11-6-7 | 29 |
| 25 | November 27 | Dallas Stars | 2-5 | Phoenix Coyotes | | Turco 8-5-5 | 10,691 | 11-7-7 | 29 |
| 26 | November 28 | Tampa Bay Lightning | 3-4 | Dallas Stars | OT | Auld 4-2-2 | 17,334 | 12-7-7 | 31 |
| 27 | November 30 | Dallas Stars | 1-4 | Detroit Red Wings | | Turco 8-6-5 | 17,645 | 12-8-7 | 31 |

December: 6-3–4 (Home: 5–1–1; Road: 1–2–3)
| # | Date | Visitor | Score | Home | OT | Decision | Attendance | Record | Pts | Recap |
| 28 | December 3 | Anaheim Ducks | 1-3 | Dallas Stars | | Turco 9-6-5 | 16,217 | 13-8-7 | 33 |
| 29 | December 5 | Edmonton Oilers | 3-2 | Dallas Stars | SO | Turco 9-6-6 | 15,860 | 13-8-8 | 34 |
| 30 | December 8 | Dallas Stars | 3-4 | Anaheim Ducks | OT | Turco 9-6-7 | 13,861 | 13-8-9 | 35 |
| 31 | December 11 | Dallas Stars | 3-2 | San Jose Sharks | SO | Turco 10-6-7 | 17,562 | 14-8-9 | 37 |
| 32 | December 12 | Dallas Stars | 2-3 | Los Angeles Kings | SO | Auld 4-2-3 | 18,118 | 14-8-10 | 38 |
| 33 | December 16 | Dallas Stars | 3-5 | Carolina Hurricanes | | Turco 10-7-7 | 13,954 | 14-9-10 | 38 |
| 34 | December 17 | Dallas Stars | 5-6 | Atlanta Thrashers | OT | Auld 4-2-4 | 11,957 | 14-9-11 | 39 |
| 35 | December 19 | Detroit Red Wings | 3-4 | Dallas Stars | | Turco 11-7-7 | 18,532 | 15-9-11 | 41 |
| 36 | December 21 | San Jose Sharks | 4-2 | Dallas Stars | | Turco 11-8-7 | 18,532 | 15-10-11 | 41 |
| 37 | December 23 | Columbus Blue Jackets | 1-3 | Dallas Stars | | Auld 5-2-4 | 16,532 | 16-10-11 | 43 |
| 38 | December 26 | Dallas Stars | 1-4 | Colorado Avalanche | | Auld 5-3-4 | 18,007 | 16-11-11 | 43 |
| 39 | December 29 | Chicago Blackhawks | 4-5 | Dallas Stars | | Turco 12-8-7 | 18,532 | 17-11-11 | 45 |
| 40 | December 31 | Anaheim Ducks | 3-5 | Dallas Stars | | Turco 13-8-7 | 18,532 | 18-11-11 | 47 |

January: 6-9–0 (Home: 5–2–0; Road: 1–7–0)
| # | Date | Visitor | Score | Home | OT | Decision | Attendance | Record | Pts | Recap |
| 41 | January 2 | Vancouver Canucks | 3-1 | Dallas Stars | | Turco 13-9-7 | 17,059 | 18-12-11 | 47 |
| 42 | January 5 | Dallas Stars | 0-4 | New Jersey Devils | | Auld 5-4-4 | 14,202 | 18-13-11 | 47 |
| 43 | January 6 | Dallas Stars | 2-5 | New York Rangers | | Turco 13-10-7 | 18,200 | 18-14-11 | 47 |
| 44 | January 8 | New York Islanders | 3-4 | Dallas Stars | | Turco 14-10-7 | 17,430 | 19-14-11 | 49 |
| 45 | January 10 | Dallas Stars | 0-2 | Columbus Blue Jackets | | Turco 14-11-7 | 14,501 | 19-15-11 | 49 |
| 46 | January 12 | Dallas Stars | 3-6 | Philadelphia Flyers | | Turco 14-12-7 | 19,133 | 19-16-11 | 49 |
| 47 | January 14 | Dallas Stars | 3-5 | Montreal Canadiens | | Turco 14-13-7 | 21,273 | 19-17-11 | 49 |
| 48 | January 16 | Detroit Red Wings | 2-3 | Dallas Stars | SO | Auld 6-4-4 | 18,532 | 20-17-11 | 51 |
| 49 | January 18 | Minnesota Wild | 3-4 | Dallas Stars | | Auld 7-4-4 | 16,302 | 21-17-11 | 53 |
| 50 | January 21 | Dallas Stars | 3-4 | Vancouver Canucks | | Auld 7-5-4 | 18,810 | 21-18-11 | 53 |
| 51 | January 22 | Dallas Stars | 4-3 | Edmonton Oilers | | Turco 15-13-7 | 16,839 | 22-18-11 | 55 |
| 52 | January 24 | Dallas Stars | 0-4 | Colorado Avalanche | | Turco 15-14-7 | 11,741 | 22-19-11 | 55 |
| 53 | January 27 | Calgary Flames | 3-4 | Dallas Stars | SO | Auld 8-5-4 | 16,807 | 23-19-11 | 57 |
| 54 | January 29 | Colorado Avalanche | 2-3 | Dallas Stars | | Auld 9-5-4 | 18,532 | 24-19-11 | 59 |
| 55 | January 31 | Phoenix Coyotes | 4-2 | Dallas Stars | | Auld 9-6-4 | 16,498 | 24-20-11 | 59 |

February: 3-1–1 (Home: 2–0–0; Road: 1–1–1)
| # | Date | Visitor | Score | Home | OT | Decision | Attendance | Record | Pts | Recap |
| 56 | February 2 | Minnesota Wild | 2-4 | Dallas Stars | | Turco 15-14-7 | 16,729 | 25-20-11 | 61 |
| 57 | February 4 | Dallas Stars | 1-2 | Columbus Blue Jackets | | Turco 15-15-7 | 14,028 | 25-21-11 | 61 |
| 58 | February 6 | Phoenix Coyotes | 0-4 | Dallas Stars | | Turco 16-15-7 | 18,532 | 26-21-11 | 63 |
| 59 | February 9 | Dallas Stars | 3-4 | Chicago Blackhawks | SO | Turco 16-15-8 | 21,446 | 26-21-12 | 64 |
| 60 | February 11 | Dallas Stars | 3-1 | Calgary Flames | | Turco 17-15-8 | 19,289 | 27-21-12 | 66 |
| 61 | February 13 | Dallas Stars | 3-0 | Phoenix Coyotes | | Turco 18-15-8 | 16,734 | 28-21-12 | 68 |

March: 6-8-2 (Home: 3-4-2; Road: 3-4-0)
| # | Date | Visitor | Score | Home | OT | Decision | Attendance | Record | Pts | Recap |
| 62 | March 2 | Los Angeles Kings | 5-1 | Dallas Stars | | Turco 18-16-8 | 15,571 | 28-22-12 | 68 |
| 63 | March 4 | St. Louis Blues | 6-1 | Dallas Stars | | Turco 18-17-8 | 17,132 | 28-23-12 | 68 |
| 64 | March 6 | Dallas Stars | 3-6 | Pittsburgh Penguins | | Lehtonen 0-1-0 | 17,132 | 28-24-12 | 68 |
| 65 | March 8 | Dallas Stars | 4-3 | Washington Capitals | SO | Turco 19-17-8 | 18,277 | 29-24-12 | 70 |
| 66 | March 10 | Dallas Stars | 3-5 | Buffalo Sabres | | Turco 19-18-8 | 18,690 | 29-25-12 | 70 |
| 67 | March 12 | Los Angeles Kings | 2-1 | Dallas Stars | SO | Turco 19-18-9 | 16,651 | 29-25-13 | 71 |
| 68 | March 14 | Colorado Avalanche | 5-3 | Dallas Stars | | Turco 19-19-9 | 16,246 | 29-26-13 | 71 |
| 69 | March 16 | San Jose Sharks | 2-8 | Dallas Stars | | Lehtonen 1-1-0 | 18,532 | 30-26-13 | 73 |
| 70 | March 18 | Philadelphia Flyers | 3-2 | Dallas Stars | | Lehtonen 1-2-0 | 17,529 | 30-27-13 | 73 |
| 71 | March 20 | Ottawa Senators | 4-5 | Dallas Stars | | Lehtonen 2-2-0 | 17,110 | 31-27-13 | 75 |
| 72 | March 21 | Phoenix Coyotes | 3-2 | Dallas Stars | SO | Turco 19-19-10 | 16,114 | 31-27-14 | 76 |
| 73 | March 23 | Dallas Stars | 3-1 | Nashville Predators | | Lehtonen 3-2-0 | 15,501 | 32-27-14 | 78 |
| 74 | March 25 | Dallas Stars | 0-3 | San Jose Sharks | | Turco 19-20-10 | 17,562 | 32-28-14 | 78 |
| 75 | March 27 | Dallas Stars | 4-1 | Los Angeles Kings | | Lehtonen 4-2-0 | 18,118 | 33-28-14 | 80 |
| 76 | March 29 | Dallas Stars | 3-1 | Anaheim Ducks | | Lehtonen 4-3-0 | 15,070 | 33-29-14 | 80 |
| 77 | March 31 | San Jose Sharks | 1-5 | Dallas Stars | | Turco 20-20-10 | 17,263 | 34-29-14 | 82 |

April: 3-2-0 (Home: 2-1-0; Road: 1-1-0)
| # | Date | Visitor | Score | Home | OT | Decision | Attendance | Record | Pts | Recap |
| 78 | April 2 | Edmonton Oilers | 3-6 | Dallas Stars | | Lehtonen 5-3-0 | 17,626 | 35-29-14 | 84 |
| 79 | April 3 | Dallas Stars | 1-2 | St. Louis Blues | | Lehtonen 5-4-0 | 19,150 | 35-30-14 | 84 |
| 80 | April 6 | Chicago Blackhawks | 5-2 | Dallas Stars | | Climie 0-1-0 | 17,826 | 35-31-14 | 84 |
| 81 | April 8 | Anaheim Ducks | 2-3 | Dallas Stars | SO | Turco 21-20-10 | 18,009 | 36-31-14 | 86 |
| 82 | April 10 | Dallas Stars | 4-3 | Minnesota Wild | SO | Turco 22-20-10 | 19,109 | 37-31-14 | 88 |

Legend: Win (2 points) Loss (0 points) Overtime/shootout loss (1 point)

== Player statistics ==
=== Skaters ===
Note: GP = Games played; G = Goals; A = Assists; Pts = Points; +/− = Plus/minus; PIM = Penalty minutes

Regular season

| Player | GP | G | A | Pts | +/− | PIM |
|---|---|---|---|---|---|---|
| Brad Richards | 80 | 24 | 67 | 91 | -12 | 14 |
| Loui Eriksson | 82 | 29 | 42 | 71 | -4 | 26 |
| James Neal | 78 | 27 | 28 | 55 | -5 | 64 |
| Mike Ribeiro | 66 | 19 | 34 | 53 | -5 | 38 |
| Brenden Morrow | 76 | 20 | 26 | 46 | -3 | 69 |
| Stephane Robidas | 82 | 10 | 31 | 41 | -10 | 70 |
| Jamie Benn | 82 | 22 | 19 | 41 | -1 | 45 |
| Steve Ott | 73 | 22 | 14 | 36 | -14 | 153 |
| Mike Modano | 59 | 14 | 16 | 30 | -6 | 22 |
| Trevor Daley | 77 | 6 | 16 | 22 | 3 | 25 |
| Jere Lehtinen | 58 | 4 | 13 | 17 | -8 | 8 |
| Toby Petersen | 78 | 9 | 6 | 15 | 3 | 6 |
| Matt Niskanen | 74 | 3 | 12 | 15 | -15 | 18 |
| Tom Wandell | 50 | 5 | 10 | 15 | 2 | 14 |
| Karlis Skrastins | 79 | 2 | 11 | 13 | -4 | 24 |
| Fabian Brunnstrom | 44 | 2 | 9 | 11 | -3 | 10 |
| Mark Fistric | 67 | 1 | 9 | 10 | 27 | 69 |
| Brandon Segal^{†} | 19 | 5 | 5 | 10 | 3 | 18 |
| Brian Sutherby | 46 | 5 | 4 | 9 | 8 | 66 |
| Nicklas Grossmann | 71 | 0 | 7 | 7 | -3 | 32 |
| Krys Barch | 63 | 0 | 6 | 6 | 0 | 130 |
| Jeff Woywitka | 36 | 0 | 3 | 3 | -6 | 11 |
| Warren Peters | 11 | 1 | 0 | 1 | 1 | 2 |
| Philip Larsen | 2 | 0 | 1 | 1 | 1 | 0 |
| Maxime Fortunus | 8 | 0 | 0 | 0 | -6 | 4 |
| Francis Wathier | 5 | 0 | 0 | 0 | 0 | 5 |
| Raymond Sawada | 5 | 0 | 0 | 0 | 1 | 0 |
| Aaron Gagnon | 2 | 0 | 0 | 0 | 0 | 0 |
| Perttu Lindgren | 1 | 0 | 0 | 0 | 0 | 0 |
| Ivan Vishnevskiy^{‡} | 2 | 0 | 0 | 0 | -2 | 0 |

=== Goaltenders ===
Note: GP = Games played; TOI = Time on ice (minutes); W = Wins; L = Losses; OT = Overtime losses; GA = Goals against; GAA= Goals against average; SA= Shots against; SV= Saves; Sv% = Save percentage; SO= Shutouts

Regular season

| Player | GP | TOI | W | L | OT | GA | GAA | SA | Sv% | SO | G | A | PIM |
|---|---|---|---|---|---|---|---|---|---|---|---|---|---|
| Marty Turco | 53 | 3088 | 22 | 20 | 11 | 140 | 2.72 | 1605 | .913 | 4 | 0 | 4 | 10 |
| Kari Lehtonen | 12 | 663 | 6 | 4 | 0 | 31 | 2.81 | 350 | .911 | 0 | 0 | 1 | 0 |
| Matt Climie | 1 | 60 | 0 | 1 | 0 | 5 | 5.00 | 38 | .868 | 0 | 0 | 0 | 0 |
| Alex Auld^{‡} | 21 | 1181 | 9 | 6 | 3 | 59 | 3.00 | 558 | .894 | 0 | 0 | 2 | 2 |

^{†}Denotes player spent time with another team before joining Stars. Stats reflect time spent with the Stars only.
^{‡}Traded mid-season
Bold/italics denotes franchise record

== Awards and records ==
=== Awards ===
Regular Season
| Player | Award | Awarded |
| Loui Eriksson | NHL Third Star of the Week | January 4, 2010 |
| Marty Turco | NHL Third Star of the Week | February 15, 2010 |

=== Milestones ===
Regular Season
| Player | Milestone | Reached |
| Jamie Benn | 1st Career NHL Game | October 3, 2009 |
| Jamie Benn | 1st Career NHL Assist; 1st Career NHL Point | October 6, 2009 |
| Jamie Benn | 1st Career NHL Goal | October 11, 2009 |
| Aaron Gagnon | 1st Career NHL Game | October 16, 2009 |
| Perttu Lindgren | 1st Career NHL Game | October 19, 2009 |
| Francis Wathier | 1st Career NHL Game | October 21, 2009 |
| Mike Modano | 800th Career NHL Assist | April 2, 2010 |

== Transactions ==
The Stars have been involved in the following transactions during the 2009–10 season.

=== Trades ===
| Date | Details |
| June 27, 2009 | To San Jose Sharks 7th-round pick (189th overall) in 2009 | To Dallas Stars 6th-round pick in 2010 |
| July 8, 2009 | To Ottawa Senators 6th-round pick in 2010 | To Dallas Stars Alex Auld |
| February 9, 2010 | To Atlanta Thrashers Ivan Vishnevskiy; 4th-round pick in 2010 | To Dallas Stars Kari Lehtonen |

=== Free agents acquired ===
| Player | Former team | Contract terms |
| Karlis Skrastins | Florida Panthers | 2 years, $2.75 million |
| Warren Peters | Calgary Flames | 1 year, 2-way contract |
| Jeff Woywitka | St. Louis Blues | 2 years, $1.3 million |
| Mathieu Tousignant | Texas Stars | 3-year entry-level contract |
| Sean Backman | Yale University | 1 year |

=== Free agents lost ===
| Player | New team | Contract terms |
| Steve Begin | Boston Bruins | 1 year, $850,000 |
| Chris Conner | Pittsburgh Penguins | 1 year |
| Brendan Morrison | Washington Capitals | 1 year, $1.5 million |
| Joel Lundqvist | Frolunda HC | 6 years |
| Sergei Zubov | SKA Saint Petersburg | 6 years |
| Darryl Sydor | St. Louis Blues | 1 year |
| Mark Parrish | Tampa Bay Lightning | 1 year, 2-way contract |

=== Claimed via waivers ===
| Player | Former team | Date claimed off waivers |
|---|---|---|
| Brandon Segal | Los Angeles Kings | February 11, 2010 |

=== Lost via waivers ===
| Player | New team | Date claimed off waivers |
|---|---|---|
| Alex Auld | New York Rangers | February 27, 2010 |

=== Player signings ===
| Player | Contract terms |
| Matt Climie | 1 year, 2-way contract |
| Brent Krahn | 1 year, 2-way contract |
| Jere Lehtinen | 1 year, $1.5 million |
| Mark Fistric | 3 years, $3 million |
| Aaron Gagnon | 1 year, 2-way contract |
| Tyler Beskorowany | 3-year entry-level contract |
| Tristan King | 3-year entry-level contract |
| Hubert Labrie | 3-year entry-level contract |
| Stephane Robidas | 4 years, $13.2 million contract extension |
| Loui Eriksson | 6 years, $25.5 million contract extension |
| Ondrej Roman | 3-year entry-level contract |
| Steve Ott | 4 years, $11.8 million contract extension |
| Tomas Vincour | 3-year entry-level contract |
| Tom Wandell | 2 years, $1.55 million contract extension |
| Toby Petersen | 2 years, $1.55 million contract extension |
| Kari Lehtonen | 3 years, $10.65 million contract extension |

== Draft picks ==
The Stars' picks at the 2009 NHL entry draft in Montreal.

| Round | # | Player | Position | Nationality | College/Junior/Club team (League) |
|---|---|---|---|---|---|
| 1 | 8 | Scott Glennie | (RW) | Canada | Brandon Wheat Kings (WHL) |
| 2 | 38 | Alex Chiasson | (RW) | Canada | Des Moines Buccaneers (USHL) |
| 3 | 69 | Reilly Smith | (RW) | Canada | St. Michael's Buzzers (OJHL) |
| 5 | 129 | Tomas Vincour | (C) | Czech Republic | Edmonton Oil Kings (WHL) |
| 6 | 159 | Curtis McKenzie | (LW) | Canada | Penticton Vees (BCHL) |

== See also ==
- 2009–10 NHL season

== Farm teams ==
=== Texas Stars (AHL) ===
The Texas Stars played their inaugural season in 2009-10 after being granted limited membership into the league. The Stars finished the regular season second in the Western Division. In the 2010 Calder Cup Playoffs They swept Rockford in the first round, then beat Chicago and Hamilton in seven games to win the Western Division and Western Conference respectively. They lost to the Hershey Bears in game six of the 2010 Calder Cup Finals.

=== Idaho Steelheads (ECHL) ===
In 2009–10, the Steelheads clinched their first Brabham Cup with one week remaining in the season. They received a bye in the first round of the 2010 Kelly Cup Playoffs before sweeping the Utah Grizzlies in the conference semifinals and the Stockton Thunder in six games to win the National Conference Championship to advance to their 3rd Kelly Cup Finals since joining the league in 2003. They met the Cincinnati Cyclones in the finals, but lost the series 4–1, with each game being decided by only one goal.

=== Allen Americans (CHL) ===
On April 15, 2009, the Central Hockey League announced an expansion team for Allen, Texas, to begin play in the 2009–10 season. The Allen Americans finished second in the Southern Conference. In the playoffs, Allen beat Laredo and Odessa in seven games. The Rapid City Rush beat the Americans in game six of the 2010 Ray Miron President's Cup Finals.
