= 2009–10 Detroit Red Wings season =

National Hockey League team season

2009–10 Detroit Red Wings
- Division: 2nd Central
- Conference: 5th Western
- 2009–10 record: 44–24–14
- Home record: 25–10–6
- Road record: 19–14–8
- Goals for: 229
- Goals against: 216

Team information
- General manager: Ken Holland
- Coach: Mike Babcock
- Captain: Nicklas Lidstrom
- Alternate captains: Pavel Datsyuk; Kris Draper; Henrik Zetterberg
- Arena: Joe Louis Arena

Team leaders
- Goals: Pavel Datsyuk (27)
- Assists: Henrik Zetterberg (47)
- Points: Pavel Datsyuk and Henrik Zetterberg (70)
- Penalty minutes: Todd Bertuzzi (80)
- Plus/minus: Brian Rafalski (23)
- Wins: Jimmy Howard (37)
- Goals against average: Jimmy Howard (2.26)

The 2009–10 Detroit Red Wings season was the team's 84th season of play for the franchise (78th as the Detroit Red Wings). The Red Wings once again qualified for the Stanley Cup playoffs, but lost in the Western Conference Semifinal. Additionally, for the first time since 1999–2000, the Red Wings did not win their division.

== Regular season ==
During the regular season, the Red Wings were shut-out an NHL-high nine times. They also tied the Calgary Flames for the fewest shorthanded goals allowed, with just one.

=== October ===
As part of the NHL Premiere, the Red Wings began their season on Friday, October 2 in Stockholm, Sweden, against the St. Louis Blues. Their home opener was on October 8 against the Chicago Blackhawks.

== 2009–10 season standings ==
=== Divisional standings ===
Central Division
		GP	W	L	OTL	GF	GA	Pts
**1**	**y – Chicago Blackhawks**	**82**	**52**	**22**	**8**	**271**	**209**	**112**
**2**	**Detroit Red Wings**	**82**	**44**	**24**	**14**	**229**	**216**	**102**
**3**	**Nashville Predators**	**82**	**47**	**29**	**6**	**225**	**225**	**100**
4	St. Louis Blues	82	40	32	10	225	223	90
5	Columbus Blue Jackets	82	32	35	15	216	259	79

=== Conference standings ===
Western Conference
R		Div	GP	W	L	OTL	GF	GA	Pts
**1**	**z – San Jose Sharks**	**PA**	**82**	**51**	**20**	**11**	**264**	**215**	113
**2**	**y – Chicago Blackhawks**	**CE**	**82**	**52**	**22**	**8**	**271**	**209**	112
**3**	**y – Vancouver Canucks**	**NW**	**82**	**49**	**28**	**5**	**272**	**222**	103
**4**	**Phoenix Coyotes**	**PA**	**82**	**50**	**25**	**7**	**225**	**202**	107
**5**	**Detroit Red Wings**	**CE**	**82**	**44**	**24**	**14**	**229**	**216**	102
**6**	**Los Angeles Kings**	**PA**	**82**	**46**	**27**	**9**	**241**	**219**	101
**7**	**Nashville Predators**	**CE**	**82**	**47**	**29**	**6**	**225**	**225**	100
**8**	**Colorado Avalanche**	**NW**	**82**	**43**	**30**	**9**	**244**	**233**	95
8.5
9	Calgary Flames	NW	82	40	32	10	225	223	90
10	St. Louis Blues	CE	82	40	32	10	204	210	90
11	Anaheim Ducks	PA	82	39	32	11	238	251	89
12	Dallas Stars	PA	82	37	31	14	237	254	88
13	Minnesota Wild	NW	82	38	36	8	219	246	84
14	Columbus Blue Jackets	CE	82	32	35	15	216	259	79
15	Edmonton Oilers	NW	82	27	47	8	214	284	62

bold – Qualified for playoffs; y – Won division; z – Won conference (and division)

=== Game log ===
2009–10 Game Log
October: 5–4–3 (Home: 3–1–1; Road: 2–3–2)

#	Date	Visitor	Score	Home	OT	Decision	Attendance	Record	Pts
1	October 2	**Detroit**	3 – 4	St. Louis		Osgood	13,850	0–1–0	0
2	October 3	St. Louis	5 – 3	**Detroit**		Howard	13,850	0–2–0	0
3	October 8	Chicago	2 – 3	**Detroit**		Osgood	20,066	1–2–0	2
4	October 10	Washington	2 – 3	**Detroit**		Osgood	19,122	2–2–0	4
5	October 13	**Detroit**	2 – 6	Buffalo		Osgood	17,459	2–3–0	4
6	October 15	Los Angeles	2 – 5	**Detroit**		Osgood	17,782	3–3–0	6
7	October 17	Colorado	4 – 3	**Detroit**	SO	Osgood	19,763	3–3–1	7
8	October 22	**Detroit**	2 – 3	Phoenix	OT	Osgood	11,938	3–3–2	8
9	October 24	**Detroit**	1 – 3	Colorado		Howard	17,690	3–4–2	8
10	October 27	**Detroit**	5 – 4	Vancouver		Howard	18,810	4–4–2	10
11	October 29	**Detroit**	5 – 6	Edmonton	SO	Howard	16,839	4–4–3	11
12	October 31	**Detroit**	3 – 1	Calgary		Osgood	19,289	5–4–3	13
**^1**Played at Ericsson Globe in Stockholm, Sweden as part of the NHL Premiere.

November: 8–5–1 (Home: 5–3–1; Road: 3–2–0)

#	Date	Visitor	Score	Home	OT	Decision	Attendance	Record	Pts
13	November 3	Boston	0 – 2	Detroit		Osgood	19,167	6–4–3	15
14	November 5	San Jose	1 – 2	Detroit	SO	Osgood	19,558	7–4–3	17
15	November 7	Detroit	1 – 5	Toronto		Osgood	19,303	7–5–3	17
16	November 11	Detroit	9 – 1	Columbus		Howard	15,304	8–5–3	19
17	November 12	Vancouver	1 – 3	Detroit		Howard	20,066	9–5–3	21
18	November 14	Anaheim	4 – 7	Detroit		Howard	20,066	10–5–3	23
19	November 18	Dallas	3 – 1	Detroit		Howard	18,112	10–6–3	23
20	November 20	Florida	2 – 1	Detroit	OT	Osgood	18,634	10–6–4	24
21	November 21	Detroit	3 – 2	Montreal	SO	Howard	21,273	11–6–4	26
22	November 23	Detroit	1 – 3	Nashville		Osgood	14,410	11–7–4	26
23	November 25	Atlanta	2 – 0	Detroit		Howard	20,066	11–8–4	26
24	November 27	Calgary	3 – 0	Detroit		Osgood	20,066	11–9–4	26
25	November 28	Detroit	4 – 3	St. Louis	SO	Howard	19,150	12–9–4	28
26	November 30	Dallas	1 – 4	Detroit		Howard	17,645	13–9–4	30

December: 7–5–2 (Home: 5–3–0; Road: 2–2–2)

#	Date	Visitor	Score	Home	OT	Decision	Attendance	Record	Pts
27	December 3	Edmonton	4 – 1	Detroit		Howard	18,018	13–10–4	30
28	December 5	Detroit	3 – 4	New Jersey	SO	Osgood	17,625	13–10–5	31
29	December 6	Detroit	3 – 1	NY Rangers		Howard	18,200	14–10–5	33
30	December 9	St. Louis	1 – 0	Detroit		Howard	18,165	14–11–5	33
31	December 11	Anaheim	2 – 3	Detroit	OT	Howard	20,066	15–11–5	35
32	December 12	Detroit	3 – 2	Nashville	OT	Osgood	16,673	16–11–5	37
33	December 14	Phoenix	2 – 3	Detroit		Howard	18,795	17–11–5	39
34	December 17	Tampa Bay	0 – 3	Detroit		Howard	19,474	18–11–5	41
35	December 19	Detroit	3 – 4	Dallas		Howard	18,532	18–12–5	41
36	December 20	Detroit	0 – 3	Chicago		Osgood	21,781	18–13–5	41
37	December 23	Chicago	3 – 0	Detroit		Howard	20,066	18–14–5	41
38	December 26	Columbus	1 – 2	Detroit		Howard	20,066	19–14–5	43
39	December 28	Detroit	0 – 1	Columbus	OT	Howard	18,421	19–14–6	44
40	December 31	Colorado	2 – 4	Detroit		Howard	20,066	20–14–6	46

January: 6–5–4 (Home: 2–1–2; Road: 4–4–2)

#	Date	Visitor	Score	Home	OT	Decision	Attendance	Record	Pts
41	January 2	Detroit	4 – 1	Phoenix		Howard	17,125	21–14–6	48
42	January 5	Detroit	1 – 4	Anaheim		Howard	15,531	21–15–6	48
43	January 7	Detroit	2 – 1	Los Angeles		Howard	18,118	22–15–6	50
44	January 9	Detroit	4 – 1	San Jose		Howard	17,562	23–15–6	52
45	January 12	Detroit	0 – 6	NY Islanders		Howard	12,254	23–16–6	52
46	January 14	Carolina	1 – 3	Detroit		Howard	20,066	24–16–6	54
47	January 16	Detroit	2 – 3	Dallas	SO	Howard	18,532	24–16–7	55
48	January 17	Chicago	4 – 3	Detroit	SO	Howard	20,066	24–16–8	56
49	January 19	Detroit	2 – 3	Chicago		Osgood	18,277	24–17–8	56
50	January 21	Detroit	4 – 3	Minnesota	SO	Howard	18,330	25–17–8	58
51	January 23	Los Angeles	3 – 2	Detroit		Howard	20,066	25–18–8	58
52	January 26	Phoenix	5 – 4	Detroit	OT	Howard	19,843	25–18–9	59
53	January 27	Detroit	2 – 5	Minnesota		Osgood	18,316	25–19–9	59
54	January 29	Nashville	2 – 4	Detroit		Howard	20,066	26–19–9	61
55	January 31	Detroit	1 – 2	Pittsburgh	SO	Howard	17,105	26–19–10	62

February: 2–2–1 (Home: 1–0–0; Road: 1–2–1)

#	Date	Visitor	Score	Home	OT	Decision	Attendance	Record	Pts
56	February 2	Detroit	4 – 2	San Jose		Howard	17,562	27–19–10	64
57	February 3	Detroit	1 – 3	Anaheim		Howard	15,180	27–20–10	64
58	February 6	Detroit	3 - 4	Los Angeles		Howard	18,118	27-21-10	64
59	February 9	Detroit	3 – 4	St. Louis	SO	Howard	19,150	27–21–11	65
60	February 11	San Jose	3 – 2	Detroit	SO	Howard	20,066	27–21–12	66
61	February 13	Ottawa	1 – 4	Detroit		Howard	20,066	28–21–12	68

March: 12–2–1 (Home: 7–2–0; Road: 5–0–1)

#	Date	Visitor	Score	Home	OT	Decision	Attendance	Record	Pts
62	March 1	Detroit	3 – 2	Colorado		Howard	18,007	29–21–12	70
63	March 3	Vancouver	6 - 3	Detroit		Osgood	19,536	29-22-12	70
64	March 5	Nashville	2 - 5	Detroit		Howard	19,608	30-22-12	72
65	March 7	Detroit	5 - 4	Chicago		Howard	22,309	31-22-12	74
66	March 9	Calgary	4 - 2	Detroit		Howard	20,066	31-23-12	74
67	March 11	Minnesota	1 - 5	Detroit		Howard	19,327	32-23-12	76
68	March 13	Buffalo	2 - 3	Detroit	OT	Howard	20,066	33-23-12	78
69	March 15	Detroit	3 - 2	Calgary		Howard	19,289	34-23-12	80
70	March 19	Detroit	2 - 3	Edmonton	SO	Howard	16,829	34-23-13	81
71	March 20	Detroit	4 - 3	Vancouver	OT	Howard	18,810	35-23-13	83
72	March 22	Pittsburgh	1 - 3	Detroit		Howard	20,066	36-23-13	85
73	March 24	St. Louis	2 - 4	Detroit		Howard	19,625	37-23-13	87
74	March 26	Minnesota	2 - 6	Detroit		Howard	20,066	38-23-13	89
75	March 27	Detroit	1 - 0	Nashville	SO	Howard	17,113	39-23-13	91
76	March 30	Edmonton	4 - 5	Detroit		Howard	19,343	40-23-13	93

April: 4–1–1 (Home: 1–0–1; Road: 3–1–0)

#	Date	Visitor	Score	Home	OT	Decision	Attendance	Record	Pts
77	April 1	Columbus	2 - 3	Detroit		Howard	19,259	41-23-13	95
78	April 3	Nashville	4 - 3	Detroit	OT	Howard	20,066	41-23-14	96
79	April 4	Detroit	3 - 4	Philadelphia		Howard	19,596	41-24-14	96
80	April 7	Columbus	3 - 4	Detroit		Howard	20,066	42-24-14	98
81	April 9	Detroit	1 - 0	Columbus	SO	Howard	18,512	43-24-14	100
82	April 11	Detroit	3 - 2	Chicago	OT	Howard	22,428	44-24-14	102

**Legend**: Win (2 points) Loss (0 points) Overtime/shootout loss (1 point)

== Playoffs ==
As of the conclusion of the previous season, the Red Wings have made the Stanley Cup playoffs for 18 consecutive seasons, the longest current post-season streak for a single team in all of North American major professional sports. As of 4 April 2010, the Red Wings have made the playoffs for 19 consecutive seasons.

2010 Stanley Cup playoffs
Western Conference quarter-final vs. (4) Phoenix Coyotes: Detroit won series 4–3

#	Date	Visitor	Score	Home	OT	Decision	Attendance	Series
1	Apr 14	Detroit	2 – 3	Coyotes		Howard	17,125	0–1
2	Apr 16	Detroit	7 – 4	Coyotes		Howard	17,386	1–1
3	Apr 18	Coyotes	4 – 2	Detroit		Howard	20,066	1–2
4	Apr 20	Coyotes	0 – 3	Detroit		Howard	20,066	2–2
5	Apr 23	Detroit	4 – 1	Coyotes		Howard	17,458	3–2
6	Apr 25	Coyotes	5 – 2	Detroit		Howard	20,066	3–3
7	Apr 27	Detroit	6 – 1	Coyotes		Howard	17,543	4–3

Western Conference semi-final vs. (1) San Jose Sharks: San Jose won series 4-1

#	Date	Visitor	Score	Home	OT	Decision	Attendance	Series
1	Apr 29	Detroit	3 – 4	Sharks		Howard	17,562	0–1
2	May 2	Detroit	3 – 4	Sharks		Howard	17,562	0–2
3	May 4	Sharks	4 – 3	Detroit	OT	Howard	20,066	0–3
4	May 6	Sharks	1 – 7	Detroit		Howard	20,066	1–3
5	May 8	Detroit	1 – 2	Sharks		Howard	17,562	1–4

Legend: Win Loss

== Player statistics ==
=== Skaters ===
Note: GP = Games played; G = Goals; A = Assists; Pts = Points; +/− = Plus/minus; PIM = Penalty minutes

Regular season

Player	GP	G	A	Pts	+/−	PIM
Pavel Datsyuk	80	27	43	70	+17	18
Henrik Zetterberg	74	23	47	70	+12	26
Nicklas Lidstrom	82	9	40	49	+22	24
Tomas Holmstrom	68	25	20	45	+5	60
Todd Bertuzzi	82	18	26	44	-7	80
Brian Rafalski	78	8	34	42	+23	26
Valtteri Filppula	55	11	24	35	-4	24
Dan Cleary	64	15	19	34	-3	29
Darren Helm	75	11	13	24	-2	18
Kris Draper	81	7	15	22	-2	28
Niklas Kronwall	48	7	15	22	+5	32
Patrick Eaves	65	12	10	22	0	26
Johan Franzen	27	10	11	21	+1	22
Brad Stuart	82	4	16	20	-12	22
Drew Miller^{†}	66	10	9	19	5	10
Jason Williams	44	6	9	15	-7	8
Jonathan Ericsson	62	4	9	13	-15	44
Brett Lebda	63	1	7	8	-2	24
Ville Leino^{‡}	42	4	3	7	-10	6
Kirk Maltby	52	4	2	6	+1	32
Derek Meech	49	2	4	6	-12	19
Justin Abdelkader	50	3	3	6	-11	35
Doug Janik	13	0	2	2	-3	18
Andreas Lilja	20	1	1	2	-2	4
Brad May	40	0	1	1	-5	66
Kris Newbury^{‡}	4	1	0	1	+1	4
Mattias Ritola	5	0	0	0	0	0
Jakub Kindl	3	0	0	0	-2	0

Playoffs

Player	GP	G	A	Pts	+/−	PIM
Johan Franzen	12	6	12	18	+8	16
Henrik Zetterberg	12	7	8	15	+11	6
Pavel Datsyuk	12	6	7	13	+3	8
Todd Bertuzzi	12	2	9	11	+4	12
Brian Rafalski	12	3	8	11	+4	2
Nicklas Lidstrom	12	4	6	10	+7	2
Valtteri Filppula	12	4	5	9	+1	6
Tomas Holmstrom	12	4	3	7	+3	12
Brad Stuart	12	2	4	6	+6	8
Niklas Kronwall	12	0	5	5	+2	12
Dan Cleary	12	2	0	2	+3	4
Jonathan Ericsson	12	0	2	2	+1	8
Drew Miller	12	1	1	2	+2	4
Justin Abdelkader	11	1	1	2	+1	36
Darren Helm	12	1	0	1	-4	4
Kris Draper	12	0	0	0	0	16
Andreas Lilja	11	0	0	0	+1	14
Jason Williams	3	0	0	0	-1	0
Patrick Eaves	8	0	0	0	-3	2
Brett Lebda	2	0	0	0	0	0
Mattias Ritola	1	0	0	0	0	0

=== Goaltenders ===
Note: GP = Games played; TOI = Time on ice (minutes); W = Wins; L = Losses; OT = Overtime losses; GA = Goals against; SO = Shutouts; Sv% = Save percentage; GAA = Goals against average

Regular season

Player	GP	TOI	W	L	OT	GA	GAA	SA	Sv%	SO	G	A	PIM
Jimmy Howard	63	3740	37	15	10	141	2.26	1849	.924	3	0	2	2
Chris Osgood	23	1252	7	9	4	63	3.02	561	.888	1	0	1	0

Playoffs

Player	GP	TOI	W	L	GA	GAA	SA	Sv%	SO	G	A	PIM
Jimmy Howard	12	720	5	7	33	2.75	387	.915	1	0	0	2

^{†}Denotes player spent time with another team before joining Red Wings. Stats reflect time with the Red Wings only.
^{‡}Traded mid-season
Bold/italics denotes franchise record

== Awards and records ==
=== Milestones ===
Regular Season
Player	Milestone	Reached
Nicklas Lidstrom	1,000th career NHL point	October 15, 2009
Tomas Holmstrom	200th career NHL goal	December 5, 2009
Henrik Zetterberg	200th career NHL goal	March 3, 2010

=== Awards ===
Regular Season
Player	Award	Awarded
Henrik Zetterberg	NHL First Star of the Week	November 16, 2009
Jimmy Howard	NHL Second Star of the Week	March 29, 2010
Jimmy Howard	NHL Second Star of the Month	March 2010
Jimmy Howard	NHL Rookie of the Month	March 2010
Pavel Datsyuk	Selke Trophy winner	June 23, 2010

== Transactions ==
The Red Wings were involved in the following transactions during the 2009–10 season.

=== Trades ===
Date	Details
February 6, 2010	To Philadelphia Flyers Ville Leino	To Detroit Red Wings Ole-Kristian Tollefsen; 5th-round pick in 2011
March 3, 2010	To New York Rangers Kris Newbury	To Detroit Red Wings Jordan Owens
March 3, 2010	To Calgary Flames Andy Delmore	To Detroit Red Wings Riley Armstrong

=== Free agents acquired ===
Player	Former team	Contract terms
Doug Janik	Montreal Canadiens	One year, $500,000
Kris Newbury	Toronto Maple Leafs	One year, $500,000
Jeremy Williams	Toronto Maple Leafs	One year, $500,000
Travis Ehrhardt	Portland Winterhawks	Three-year entry-level contract
Andy Delmore	Hamburg Freezers	One year, $500,000
Patrick Eaves	Boston Bruins	One year, $500,000
Jason Williams	Columbus Blue Jackets	One year, $1.5 million
Todd Bertuzzi	Calgary Flames	One year, $1.5 million
Brad May	Toronto Maple Leafs	One year, $500,000

=== Free agents lost ===
Player	New team	Contract terms
Marian Hossa	Chicago Blackhawks	12 years, $62.8 million
Tomas Kopecky	Chicago Blackhawks	Two years, $2.4 million
Ty Conklin	St. Louis Blues	Two years, $2.6 million
Mikael Samuelsson	Vancouver Canucks	Three years, $7.5 million
Darren Haydar	Colorado Avalanche	One year, $525,000

=== Claimed via waivers ===
Player	Former team	Date claimed off waivers
Drew Miller	Tampa Bay Lightning	November 11, 2009

=== Lost via waivers ===
Player	New team	Date claimed off waivers

=== Lost via retirement ===
Player
Darren McCarty

=== Player signings ===
Player	Contract terms
Ville Leino	Two years, $1.6 million
Jakub Kindl	Three years, $2.65 million contract extension
Tomas Tatar	Three years, entry-level contract

== Draft picks ==
The 2009 NHL entry draft was held in Montreal, Quebec, on June 26–27, 2009. Detroit made following picks:

Round	Overall Pick	Player	Position	Nationality	College/Junior/Club team (League)
2	32 (from Tampa Bay)	Landon Ferraro	C	Canada	Red Deer Rebels (WHL)
2	60	Tomas Tatar	C	Slovakia	HKm Zvolen (Slovak Extraliga)
3	75 (from Florida)	Andrej Nestrasil	C/RW	Czech Republic	Victoriaville Tigres (QMJHL)
3	90	Gleason Fournier	D	Canada	Rimouski Oceanic (QMJHL)
5	150	Nick Jensen	D	United States	Green Bay Gamblers (USHL)
6	180	Mitch Callahan	RW	United States	Kelowna Rockets (WHL)
7	210	Adam Almqvist	D	Sweden	HV71 (Elitserien)

== See also ==
- 2009–10 NHL season

== Farm teams ==
The Grand Rapids Griffins remain Detroit's American Hockey League affiliate in 2009–10 and the Toledo Walleye will become the team's ECHL affiliate in 2009-10.
