= 2009–10 St. Louis Blues season =

National Hockey League team season

2009–10 St. Louis Blues
- Division: 4th Central
- Conference: 10th (tied) Western
- 2009–10 record: 40–32–10
- Home record: 18–18–5
- Road record: 22–14–5
- Goals for: 225
- Goals against: 223

Team information
- General manager: Larry Pleau
- Coach: Davis Payne
- Captain: Eric Brewer
- Alternate captains: David Backes (Mar.–Apr.); Barret Jackman; Paul Kariya (Oct.–Mar.); Keith Tkachuk (Oct.–Mar.)
- Arena: Scottrade Center
- Average attendance: 18,883

Team leaders
- Goals: Andy McDonald; Alexander Steen (24)
- Assists: Andy McDonald (33)
- Points: Andy McDonald (57)
- Penalty minutes: Cam Janssen (190)
- Plus/minus: Mike Weaver (+10)
- Wins: Chris Mason (30)
- Goals against average: Ty Conklin (2.48)

The 2009–10 St. Louis Blues season was the team's 43rd season in the National Hockey League (NHL).

The Blues fired Andy Murray as head coach on January 2, 2010, after a below expectation record (17–17–6, 40 points), sitting in 12th place in the Western Conference. Especially galling were the frequent blown leads after two periods, and with the poorest home record (6–13–3, including one win in Sweden) in the NHL. Davis Payne was named the Blues' interim head coach, the 23rd head coach in the Blues' history. Payne was previously head coach of the Blues' top minor league affiliate, the Peoria Rivermen of the American Hockey League (AHL). After the season, Payne was named as Head Coach, removing the interim tag.

On January 18, 2010, the Blues hired goaltending consultant Tyler Love.

Keith Tkachuk announced his retirement from professional hockey on April 7, 2010, three days before the final game of the season, April 10, which he declined to play. The Blues saluted him in a tribute after the last home game, his final game ever in the NHL on April 9. The Blues missed the playoffs for the first time since the 2007–08 season

== Preseason ==
=== Game log ===
2009 pre-season game log: 5–1–1 (home: 2–1–0; road: 3–0–1)
#	Date	Visitor	Score	Home	OT	Decision	Record	Recap
1	September 15	Minnesota Wild	1–3	St. Louis Blues		Mason	1–0–0
2	September 18	Colorado Avalanche	2–6	St. Louis Blues		Conklin	2–0–0
3	September 19	Dallas Stars	4–2	St. Louis Blues		Mason	2–1–0
4	September 20	St. Louis Blues	1–2	Colorado Avalanche		Conklin	2–1–1
5	September 24	St. Louis Blues	4–1	Minnesota Wild		Conklin	3–1–1
6	September 26	St. Louis Blues	5–0	Dallas Stars		Mason	4–1–1
7	September 29 (in Linköping, Sweden)	St. Louis Blues	6–0	Linköpings HC (Sweden)		Mason	5–1–1

== Regular season ==
Despite being the most penalized team in the League with 342 power-play opportunities against, the Blues had the best penalty-kill percentage, at 86.84%.

=== Divisional standings ===
Central Division
		GP	W	L	OTL	GF	GA	Pts
**1**	**y – Chicago Blackhawks**	**82**	**52**	**22**	**8**	**271**	**209**	**112**
**2**	**Detroit Red Wings**	**82**	**44**	**24**	**14**	**229**	**216**	**102**
**3**	**Nashville Predators**	**82**	**47**	**29**	**6**	**225**	**225**	**100**
4	St. Louis Blues	82	40	32	10	225	223	90
5	Columbus Blue Jackets	82	32	35	15	216	259	79

=== Conference standings ===
Western Conference
R		Div	GP	W	L	OTL	GF	GA	Pts
**1**	**z – San Jose Sharks**	**PA**	**82**	**51**	**20**	**11**	**264**	**215**	113
**2**	**y – Chicago Blackhawks**	**CE**	**82**	**52**	**22**	**8**	**271**	**209**	112
**3**	**y – Vancouver Canucks**	**NW**	**82**	**49**	**28**	**5**	**272**	**222**	103
**4**	**Phoenix Coyotes**	**PA**	**82**	**50**	**25**	**7**	**225**	**202**	107
**5**	**Detroit Red Wings**	**CE**	**82**	**44**	**24**	**14**	**229**	**216**	102
**6**	**Los Angeles Kings**	**PA**	**82**	**46**	**27**	**9**	**241**	**219**	101
**7**	**Nashville Predators**	**CE**	**82**	**47**	**29**	**6**	**225**	**225**	100
**8**	**Colorado Avalanche**	**NW**	**82**	**43**	**30**	**9**	**244**	**233**	95
8.5
9	Calgary Flames	NW	82	40	32	10	225	223	90
10	St. Louis Blues	CE	82	40	32	10	204	210	90
11	Anaheim Ducks	PA	82	39	32	11	238	251	89
12	Dallas Stars	PA	82	37	31	14	237	254	88
13	Minnesota Wild	NW	82	38	36	8	219	246	84
14	Columbus Blue Jackets	CE	82	32	35	15	216	259	79
15	Edmonton Oilers	NW	82	27	47	8	214	284	62

bold – Qualified for playoffs; y – Won division; z – Won conference (and division)

=== Game log ===
- Green background indicates win (2 points).
- Red background indicates regulation loss (0 points).
- White background indicates overtime/shootout loss (1 point).

2009–10 game log

October: 5–6–1 (home: 2–5–0; road: 3–1–1)
#	**Date**	**Visitor**	**Score**	**Home**	**OT**	**Decision**	**Attendance**	**Record**	**Pts**	**Recap**
1	October 2 (Stockholm, SWE)	Detroit Red Wings	3–4	St. Louis Blues		Mason	13,850	1–0–0	2	StL 4, Det. 3
2	October 3 (Stockholm, SWE)	St. Louis Blues	5–3	Detroit Red Wings		Conklin	13,850	2–0–0	4	StL 5, Det. 3
3	October 8	Atlanta Thrashers	4–2	St. Louis Blues		Mason	19,150	2–1–0	4	Atl 4, StL 2
4	October 10	Los Angeles Kings	2–1	St. Louis Blues		Mason	19,150	2–2–0	4	L.A. 2, StL 1
5	October 15	St. Louis Blues	2–3	Phoenix Coyotes	OT	Mason	6,899	2–2–1	5	Pho 3, StL 2 (OT)
6	October 17	St. Louis Blues	5–0	Anaheim Ducks		Conklin	14,902	3–2–1	7	StL 5, Ana 0
7	October 20	St. Louis Blues	1–5	Pittsburgh Penguins		Mason	17,132	3–3–1	7	Pit. 5, StL 1
8	October 23	Minnesota Wild	1–3	St. Louis Blues		Mason	19,150	4–3–1	9	StL 3, Min. 1
9	October 24	Dallas Stars	4–1	St. Louis Blues		Conklin	19,150	4–4–1	9	Dal 4, StL 1
10	October 28	St. Louis Blues	5–2	Carolina Hurricanes		Mason	15,549	5–4–1	11	StL 5, Car 2
11	October 29	Phoenix Coyotes	2–0	St. Louis Blues		Conklin	18,087	5–5–1	11	Pho 2, StL 0
12	October 31	Florida Panthers	4–0	St. Louis Blues		Mason	17,943	5–6–1	11	FL 4, Stl 0

- Green background indicates win (2 points).
- Red background indicates regulation loss (0 points).
- White background indicates overtime/shootout loss (1 point).

November: 5–4–4 (home: 3–3–2; road: 2–1–2)
#	**Date**	**Visitor**	**Score**	**Home**	**OT**	**Decision**	**Attendance**	**Record**	**Pts**	**Recap**
13	November 5	Calgary Flames	2–1	St. Louis Blues	OT	Mason	17,559	5–6–2	12	Cal 2, StL 1 (OT)
14	November 7	St. Louis Blues	1–2	Philadelphia Flyers	SO	Mason	19,542	5–6–3	13	Phi. 2, StL 1 (SO)
15	November 8	St. Louis Blues	2–3	Atlanta Thrashers	SO	Conklin	10,904	5–6–4	14	Atl 3, StL 2 (SO)
16	November 10	Vancouver Canucks	1–6	St. Louis Blues		Mason	17,175	6–6–4	16	StL 6, Van. 1
17	November 12	Nashville Predators	3–1	St. Louis Blues		Mason	19,150	6–7–4	16	Nsh 3, StL 1
18	November 14	San Jose Sharks	3–1	St. Louis Blues		Mason	19,150	6–8–4	16	SJ 3, StL 1
19	November 19	Phoenix Coyotes	2–3	St. Louis Blues	OT	Mason	17,107	7–8–4	18	StL 3, Pho 2 (OT)
20	November 21	New York Islanders	1–4	St. Louis Blues		Mason	19,150	8–8–4	20	StL 4, NYI 1
21	November 23	Boston Bruins	4–2	St. Louis Blues		Mason	19,150	8–9–4	20	Bos 4, StL 2
22	November 25	St. Louis Blues	4–3	Dallas Stars	SO	Conklin	18,156	9–9–4	22	StL 4, Dal 3 (SO)
23	November 27	St. Louis Blues	3–1	Nashville Predators		Mason	13,170	10–9–4	24	StL 3, Nsh 1
24	November 28	Detroit Red Wings	4–3	St. Louis Blues	SO	Mason	19,150	10–9–5	25	Det. 4, StL 3 (SO)
25	November 30	St. Louis Blues	2–5	Columbus Blue Jackets		Mason	12,391	10–10–5	25	Col. 5, StL 2

- Green background indicates win (2 points).
- Red background indicates regulation loss (0 points).
- White background indicates overtime/shootout loss (1 point).

December: 7–7–1 (home: 1–5–1; road: 6–2–0)
#	**Date**	**Visitor**	**Score**	**Home**	**OT**	**Decision**	**Attendance**	**Record**	**Pts**	**Recap**
26	December 3	St. Louis Blues	3–2	San Jose Sharks	SO	Conklin	17,424	11–10–5	27	StL 3, SJ 2 (SO)
27	December 5	St. Louis Blues	5–4	Los Angeles Kings	SO	Mason	17,519	12–10–5	29	StL 5, L.A. 4 (SO)
28	December 7	Colorado Avalanche	4–0	St. Louis Blues		Mason	19,150	12–11–5	29	CO 4, StL 0
29	December 9	St. Louis Blues	1–0	Detroit Red Wings		Conklin	18,165	13–11–5	31	StL 1, Det. 0
30	December 11	Edmonton Oilers	5–3	St. Louis Blues		Conklin	19,150	13–12–5	31	Edm 5, StL 3
31	December 15	Calgary Flames	3–4	St. Louis Blues		Mason	19,150	14–12–5	33	StL 4, Cgy 3
32	December 16	St. Louis Blues	0–3	Chicago Blackhawks		Conklin	21,137	14–13–5	33	Chi 3, StL 0
33	December 18	Tampa Bay Lightning	6–3	St. Louis Blues		Mason	19,150	14–14–5	33	TB 6, StL 3
34	December 20	St. Louis Blues	3–1	Vancouver Canucks		Conklin	18,810	15–14–5	35	StL 3, Van 1
35	December 21	St. Louis Blues	7–2	Edmonton Oilers		Mason	16,839	16–14–5	37	StL 7, Edm 2
36	December 23	St. Louis Blues	2–1	Calgary Flames	SO	Mason	19,289	17–14–5	39	StL 2, Cal 1 (SO)
37	December 26	St. Louis Blues	3–4	Minnesota Wild		Mason	18,554	17–15–5	39	Min. 4, SrL 3
38	December 27	Buffalo Sabres	5–3	St. Louis Blues		Conklin	19,150	17–16–5	39	Buf. 5, StL 3
39	December 29	Nashville Predators	4–3	St. Louis Blues		Mason	19,150	17–17–5	39	Nsh 4, StL 3
40	December 31	Vancouver Canucks	4–3	St. Louis Blues	OT	Mason	19,150	17–17–6	40	Van 4, StL 3 (OT)

- Green background indicates win (2 points).
- Red background indicates regulation loss (0 points).
- White background indicates overtime/shootout loss (1 point).

January: 7–5–3 (home: 3–1–2; road: 4–4–1)
#	**Date**	**Visitor**	**Score**	**Home**	**OT**	**Decision**	**Attendance**	**Record**	**Pts**	**Recap**
41	January 2	Chicago Blackhawks	6–3	St. Louis Blues		Conklin	19,150	17–18–6	40	Chi 6, StL 3
42	January 6	St. Louis Blues	1–2	San Jose Sharks	OT	Mason	17,562	17–18–7	41	SJ 2, StL 1 (OT)
43	January 7	St. Louis Blues	2–4	Anaheim Ducks		Mason	14,248	17–19–7	41	Ana 4, StL 2
44	January 9	St. Louis Blues	4–3	Los Angeles Kings		Mason	18,118	18–19–7	43	StL 4, L.A. 3
45	January 12	Columbus Blue Jackets	1–4	St. Louis Blues		Mason	17,900	19–19–7	45	StL 4, CBJ 1
46	January 14	Minnesota Wild	0–1	St. Louis Blues		Mason	19,150	20–19–7	47	StL 1, Min. 0
47	January 16	New York Rangers	1–4	St. Louis Blues		Mason	19,150	21–19–7	49	StL 4, NYR 1
48	January 18	St. Louis Blues	2–4	Columbus Blue Jackets		Mason	14,505	21–20–7	49	Col. 4, StL 2
49	January 20	St. Louis Blues	4–3	Montreal Canadiens	OT	Conklin	21,273	22–20–7	51	StL 4, Mon. 3 (OT)
50	January 21	St. Louis Blues	2–3	Ottawa Senators		Mason	16,063	22–21–7	51	Ott 3, StL 2
51	January 23	Anaheim Ducks	4–3	St. Louis Blues	SO	Mason	19,150	22–21–8	52	Ana 4, StL 3 (SO)
52	January 25	St. Louis Blues	2–0	Calgary Flames		Conklin	19,289	23–21–8	54	StL 2, Cal. 0
53	January 27	St. Louis Blues	2–3	Vancouver Canucks		Conklin	18,810	23–22–8	54	Van 3, StL 2
54	January 28	St. Louis Blues	2–1	Edmonton Oilers		Mason	16,839	24–22–8	56	StL 2, Edm 1
55	January 30	Columbus Blue Jackets	3–2	St. Louis Blues	OT	Mason	19,150	24–22–9	57	CBJ 3, StL 2 (OT)

- Green background indicates win (2 points).
- Red background indicates regulation loss (0 points).
- White background indicates overtime/shootout loss (1 point).

February: 4–3–0 (home: 3–2–0; road: 1–1–0)
#	**Date**	**Visitor**	**Score**	**Home**	**OT**	**Decision**	**Attendance**	**Record**	**Pts**	**Recap**
56	February 3	St. Louis Blues	3–2	Chicago Blackhawks		Mason	21,836	25–22–9	59	StL 3, Chi. 2
57	February 4	San Jose Sharks	4–2	St. Louis Blues		Conklin	19,150	25–23–9	59	SJ 4, StL 2
58	February 6	Chicago Blackhawks	2–1	St. Louis Blues		Mason	19,150	25–24–9	59	Chi 2, StL 1
59	February 8	St. Louis Blues	2–5	Colorado Avalanche		Mason	11,261	25–25–9	59	CO 5, StL 2
60	February 9	Detroit Red Wings	3–4	St. Louis Blues	SO	Mason	19,150	26–25–9	61	StL 4, Det 3 (SO)
61	February 12	Toronto Maple Leafs	0–4	St. Louis Blues		Mason	19,150	27–25–9	63	StL 4, Tor 0
62	February 13	Washington Capitals	3–4	St. Louis Blues	SO	Mason	19,150	28–25–9	65	StL 4, Wsh 3 (SO)

- Green background indicates win (2 points).
- Red background indicates regulation loss (0 points).
- White background indicates overtime/shootout loss (1 point).

March: 9–5–0 (home: 3–2–0; road: 6–3–0)
#	**Date**	**Visitor**	**Score**	**Home**	**OT**	**Decision**	**Attendance**	**Record**	**Pts**	**Recap**
63	March 2	St. Louis Blues	5–2	Phoenix Coyotes		Mason	10,385	29–25–9	67	StL 5, Pho 2
64	March 4	St. Louis Blues	6–1	Dallas Stars		Mason	17,132	30–25–9	69	StL 6, Dal 1
65	March 6	St. Louis Blues	3–7	Colorado Avalanche		Mason	18,007	30–26–9	69	CO 7, StL 3
66	March 11	St. Louis Blues	2–1	New York Islanders	SO	Mason	11,335	31–26–9	71	StL 2, NYI 1 (SO)
67	March 13	St. Louis Blues	5–1	Columbus Blue Jackets		Mason	16,453	32–26–9	73	StL 5, CBJ 1
68	March 14	St. Louis Blues	2–4	Minnesota Wild		Mason	18,580	32–27–9	73	Min. 4, StL 2
69	March 16	Colorado Avalanche	5–3	St. Louis Blues		Mason	19,150	32–28–9	73	CO 5, StL 3
70	March 18	St. Louis Blues	4–3	New York Rangers		Conklin	18,200	33–28–9	75	StL 4, NYR 3
71	March 20	St. Louis Blues	1–0	New Jersey Devils		Conklin	17,625	34–28–9	77	StL 1, NJ 0
72	March 21	Nashville Predators	3–2	St. Louis Blues		Mason	19,150	34–29–9	77	Nsh 3, StL 2
73	March 24	St. Louis Blues	2–4	Detroit Red Wings		Conklin	19,625	34–30–9	77	Det. 4, StL 2
74	March 25	Los Angeles Kings	1–3	St. Louis Blues		Mason	19,150	35–30–9	79	StL 3, L.A. 1
75	March 28	Edmonton Oilers	1–2	St. Louis Blues		Mason	19,150	36–30–9	81	StL 2, Edm 1
76	March 30	Chicago Blackhawks	2–4	St. Louis Blues		Mason	19,150	37–30–9	83	StL 4, Chi 2

- Green background indicates win (2 points).
- Red background indicates regulation loss (0 points).
- White background indicates overtime/shootout loss (1 point).

April: 3–2–1 (home: 3–0–0; road: 0–2–1)
#	**Date**	**Visitor**	**Score**	**Home**	**OT**	**Decision**	**Attendance**	**Record**	**Pts**	**Recap**
77	April 1	St. Louis Blues	2–3	Nashville Predators		Mason	15,242	37–31–9	83	Nsh 3, StL 2
78	April 3	Dallas Stars	1–2	St. Louis Blues		Mason	19,150	38–31–9	85	StL 2, Dal 1
79	April 5	Columbus Blue Jackets	1–2	St. Louis Blues	OT	Mason	17,601	39–31–9	87	StL 2, CBJ 1 (OT)
80	April 7	St. Louis Blues	5–6	Chicago Blackhawks		Conklin	22,155	39–32–9	87	Chi 6, StL 5
81	April 9	Anaheim Ducks	3–6	St. Louis Blues		Mason	19,150	40–32–9	89	StL 6, Ana 3
82	April 10	St. Louis Blues	1–2	Nashville Predators	SO	Conklin	16,702	40–32–10	90	Nsh 2, StL 1 (SO)

== Playoffs ==
The St. Louis Blues attempted to make the playoffs in back-to-back seasons for the first time since the 2004–05 NHL lockout, but were eliminated with 3 games remaining in the season after the Colorado Avalanche achieved 93 points in locking up the 8th and final playoff spot on April 6, 2010.

== Player statistics ==
=== Skaters ===
(final, April 10, 2010) Stats

Note: GP = Games played; G = Goals; A = Assists; Pts = Points; +/− = Plus/minus; PIM = Penalty minutes

Regular season

Player	GP	G	A	Pts	+/−	PIM
Andy McDonald	79	24	33	57	-9	18
David Backes	79	17	31	48	-4	106
T. J. Oshie	76	18	30	48	-1	36
Alexander Steen	68	24	23	47	6	30
David Perron	82	20	27	47	-10	60
Paul Kariya	75	18	25	43	-7	36
Brad Boyes	82	14	28	42	1	26
Erik Johnson	79	10	29	39	1	79
Keith Tkachuk	67	13	19	32	-2	56
Carlo Colaiacovo	67	7	25	32	8	60
Jay McClement	82	11	18	29	0	22
Patrik Berglund	71	13	13	26	-5	16
Roman Polak	78	4	17	21	7	59
Barret Jackman	66	2	15	17	3	81
Eric Brewer	59	8	7	15	-17	46
B. J. Crombeen	79	7	8	15	-5	168
Mike Weaver	77	1	9	10	10	29
Darryl Sydor	47	0	8	8	-6	15
Brad Winchester	64	3	5	8	3	108
Alex Pietrangelo	9	1	1	2	-9	6
Tyson Strachan	8	0	2	2	3	4
Jonas Junland	3	0	2	2	-3	0
Lars Eller	7	2	0	2	2	4
Yan Stastny^{‡}	4	1	0	1	1	0
Derek Armstrong	6	0	0	0	-2	2
Cam Janssen	43	0	0	0	-3	190
D. J. King	12	0	0	0	-4	33
Matt D'Agostini^{†}	7	0	0	0	-3	2

^{‡}Traded mid-season. Stats reflect time with Blues only.
^{†}Denotes D'Agostini spent time with another team before joining Blues. Stats reflect time with Blues only.

=== Goaltenders ===
(final, April 10, 2010)

Note: GP = Games played; TOI = Time on ice (minutes); W = Wins; L = Losses; OT = Overtime losses; GA = Goals against; GAA= Goals against average; SA= Shots against; SV= Saves; Sv% = Save percentage; SO= Shutouts

Regular season

Player	GP	Min	W	L	OT	GA	GAA	SA	Sv%	SO	G	A	PIM
Chris Mason	61	3,512	30	22	8	148	2.53	1,699	.913	2	0	0	0
Ty Conklin	26	1,451	10	10	2	60	2.48	764	.921	4	0	1	4
TOTALS	82	4,963	40	32	10	208	2.51	2,463	.916	6	0	1	4

== Awards and records ==
=== Milestones ===
Regular season
Player	Milestone	Reached
B. J. Crombeen	100th NHL game	October 29, 2009
Lars Eller	1st NHL game, goal	November 5, 2009
David Perron	1st Hat Trick	November 10, 2009
David Perron	Highlight goal	November 21, 2009
Keith Tkachuk	200th NHL goal with Blues	November 23, 2009
Davis Payne (coach)	1st NHL win	January 9, 2010
T. J. Oshie	100th NHL game	January 16, 2010
David Perron	200th NHL game (youngest Blue ever)	February 4, 2010
Mike Weaver	1st NHL goal in 185 games (3/23/07)	March 18, 2010
Paul Kariya	400th NHL goal	March 18, 2010

=== Awards ===
Regular season
Player	Award	Awarded
Keith Tkachuk	NHL Third Star of the Week	October 5, 2009
Chris Mason	NHL Second Star of the Week	January 18, 2010
Alex Pietrangelo	Named #1 NHL Prospect	March 6, 2010

== Transactions ==
The Blues have been involved in the following transactions during the 2009–10 season.

=== Trades ===
Date	Details
June 27, 2009	To Nashville Predators 7th-round pick in 2010	To St. Louis Blues 7th-round pick (202nd overall) in 2009
December 8, 2009	To Columbus Blue Jackets Brendan Bell; Tomas Kana	To St. Louis Blues Pascal Pelletier
February 11, 2010	To Pittsburgh Penguins Steven Wagner	To St. Louis Blues Nate Guenin
March 1, 2010	To Chicago Blackhawks Hannu Toivonen; Danny Richmond	To St. Louis Blues Joe Fallon
March 2, 2010	To Montreal Canadiens Aaron Palushaj	To St. Louis Blues Matt D'Agostini
March 3, 2010	To Vancouver Canucks Yan Stastny	To St. Louis Blues Pierre-Cedric Labrie

=== Free agents acquired ===
Player	Former team	Contract terms
Ty Conklin	Detroit Red Wings	2 years, $2.6 million
Hannu Toivonen	Ilves	undisclosed
Adam Cracknell	Quad City Flames	undisclosed
Barry Tallackson	Lowell Devils	undisclosed
Bryce Lampman	Amur Khabarovsk	undisclosed
Brendan Bell	Ottawa Senators	undisclosed
Derek Armstrong	Los Angeles Kings	2-way contract
Darryl Sydor	Dallas Stars	1 year

=== Free agents lost ===
Player	New team	Contract terms
Jeff Woywitka	Dallas Stars	2 years, $1.3 million
Trent Whitfield	Boston Bruins	2 years, 2-way contract
Jay McKee	Pittsburgh Penguins	1 year, $800,000
Manny Legace	Carolina Hurricanes	1 year, $500,000

=== Claimed via waivers ===
Player	Former team	Date claimed off waivers

=== Lost via waivers ===
Player	New team	Date claimed off waivers

=== Player signings ===
Player	Contract terms
Jay McClement	3 years, $4.35 million
Keith Tkachuk	1 year, $2.15 million
Mike Weaver	1 year, $800,000
Brad Winchester	1 year, $800,000
B. J. Crombeen	2 years, $1.745 million
Ian Schultz	undisclosed
Justin Fletcher	undisclosed
Danny Richmond	undisclosed
Steven Wagner	undisclosed
Roman Polak	undisclosed
Brett Ponich	undisclosed
Tyler Shattock	undisclosed
Anthony Nigro	undisclosed

== Draft picks ==
St. Louis's picks at the 2009 NHL entry draft in Montreal on June 26–27, 2009.

Round	Pick	Player	Position	Nationality	Team (League)
1	17	David Rundblad	D	Sweden	Skelleftea AIK (Elitserien)
2	48	Brett Ponich	D	Canada	Portland Winterhawks (WHL)
3	78	Sergei Andronov	RW	Russia	Lada Togliatti (KHL)
4	108	Tyler Shattock	F	Canada	Kamloops Blazers (WHL)
6	168	David Shields	D	United States	Erie Otters (OHL)
7	202 (from Philadelphia via Nashville)	Maxwell Tardy	C	United States	East High School (Duluth) (USHS-MN)

== See also ==
- 2009–10 NHL season
- St. Louis Blues seasons
- St. Louis (sports)

== Farm teams ==
=== Peoria Rivermen ===
The Peoria Rivermen are the Blues American Hockey League affiliate in 2009–10.

=== Alaska Aces ===
The Alaska Aces are the Blues affiliate in the ECHL.
