= 2009–10 Nashville Predators season =

Professional ice hockey team season

2009–10 Nashville Predators
- Division: 3rd Central
- Conference: 7th Western
- 2009–10 record: 47–29–6
- Home record: 24–14–3
- Road record: 23–15–3
- Goals for: 225
- Goals against: 225

Team information
- General manager: David Poile
- Coach: Barry Trotz
- Captain: Jason Arnott
- Alternate captains: Steve Sullivan; Shea Weber
- Arena: Bridgestone Arena
- Average attendance: 14,979 (41 games) (87.5 % of capacity); Total: 614,143

Team leaders
- Goals: Patric Hornqvist (30)
- Assists: Steve Sullivan (34)
- Points: Patric Hornqvist (51); Steve Sullivan (51)
- Penalty minutes: Wade Belak (58)
- Plus/minus: Patric Hornqvist (+18)
- Wins: Pekka Rinne (32)
- Goals against average: Pekka Rinne (2.53)

The 2009–10 Nashville Predators season was the Nashville Predators' 12th season in the National Hockey League (NHL).

== Pre-season ==
2009 pre-season game log: 4–2–0 (home: 2–1–0; road: 2–1–0)
#	Date	Visitor	Score	Home	OT	Decision	Attendance	Record	Recap
1	September 17	Atlanta Thrashers	0 - 5	Nashville Predators		Dan Ellis	14,103	1-0-0
2	September 18	Nashville Predators	4 - 2	Carolina Hurricanes		Pekka Rinne	8,495	2-0-0
3	September 19	Columbus Blue Jackets	2 - 3	Nashville Predators		Pekka Rinne	10,703	3-0-0
4	September 23	Nashville Predators	4 - 5	Atlanta Thrashers		Pekka Rinne	5,017	3-1-0
5	September 26	Carolina Hurricanes	5 - 2	Nashville Predators		Pekka Rinne	10,973	3-2-0
6	September 27	Nashville Predators	4 - 2	Columbus Blue Jackets		Dan Ellis	13,761	4-2-0

== Regular season ==
=== Divisional standings ===
Central Division
		GP	W	L	OTL	GF	GA	Pts
**1**	**y – Chicago Blackhawks**	**82**	**52**	**22**	**8**	**271**	**209**	**112**
**2**	**Detroit Red Wings**	**82**	**44**	**24**	**14**	**229**	**216**	**102**
**3**	**Nashville Predators**	**82**	**47**	**29**	**6**	**225**	**225**	**100**
4	St. Louis Blues	82	40	32	10	225	223	90
5	Columbus Blue Jackets	82	32	35	15	216	259	79

=== Conference standings ===
Western Conference
R		Div	GP	W	L	OTL	GF	GA	Pts
**1**	**z – San Jose Sharks**	**PA**	**82**	**51**	**20**	**11**	**264**	**215**	113
**2**	**y – Chicago Blackhawks**	**CE**	**82**	**52**	**22**	**8**	**271**	**209**	112
**3**	**y – Vancouver Canucks**	**NW**	**82**	**49**	**28**	**5**	**272**	**222**	103
**4**	**Phoenix Coyotes**	**PA**	**82**	**50**	**25**	**7**	**225**	**202**	107
**5**	**Detroit Red Wings**	**CE**	**82**	**44**	**24**	**14**	**229**	**216**	102
**6**	**Los Angeles Kings**	**PA**	**82**	**46**	**27**	**9**	**241**	**219**	101
**7**	**Nashville Predators**	**CE**	**82**	**47**	**29**	**6**	**225**	**225**	100
**8**	**Colorado Avalanche**	**NW**	**82**	**43**	**30**	**9**	**244**	**233**	95
8.5
9	Calgary Flames	NW	82	40	32	10	225	223	90
10	St. Louis Blues	CE	82	40	32	10	204	210	90
11	Anaheim Ducks	PA	82	39	32	11	238	251	89
12	Dallas Stars	PA	82	37	31	14	237	254	88
13	Minnesota Wild	NW	82	38	36	8	219	246	84
14	Columbus Blue Jackets	CE	82	32	35	15	216	259	79
15	Edmonton Oilers	NW	82	27	47	8	214	284	62

bold – Qualified for playoffs; y – Won division; z – Won conference (and division)

=== Game log ===
2009–10 game log

October: 6-6–1 (home: 3–3–0; road: 3–3–1)
#	**Date**	**Visitor**	**Score**	**Home**	**OT**	**Decision**	**Attendance**	**Record**	**Pts**	**Recap**
1	October 3	Nashville Predators	3 - 2	Dallas Stars	SO	Dan Ellis	18,532	1-0-0	2
2	October 8	Colorado Avalanche	2 - 3	Nashville Predators		Dan Ellis	14,797	2-0-0	4
3	October 10	Buffalo Sabres	1 - 0	Nashville Predators		Pekka Rinne	14,209	2-1-0	4
4	October 12	Edmonton Oilers	6 - 1	Nashville Predators		Pekka Rinne	12,179	2-2-0	4
5	October 14	Nashville Predators	0 - 6	Dallas Stars		Dan Ellis	16,365	2-3-0	4
6	October 15	Chicago Blackhawks	3 - 1	Nashville Predators		Pekka Rinne	13,103	2-4-0	4
7	October 17	Nashville Predators	2 - 3	Washington Capitals	SO	Dan Ellis	18,277	2-4-1	5
8	October 21	Nashville Predators	2 - 3	Boston Bruins		Dan Ellis	16,715	2-5-1	5
9	October 22	Nashville Predators	6 - 5	Ottawa Senators	OT	Pekka Rinne	18,970	3-5-1	7
10	October 24	Nashville Predators	0 - 2	Chicago Blackhawks		Dan Ellis	20,272	3-6-1	7
11	October 28	Nashville Predators	4 - 3	Minnesota Wild		Pekka Rinne	18,199	4-6-1	9
12	October 29	Chicago Blackhawks	0 - 2	Nashville Predators		Pekka Rinne	13,585	5-6-1	11
13	October 31	Dallas Stars	2 - 4	Nashville Predators		Pekka Rinne	12,520	6-7-1	13

November: 9–4–0 (home: 5–2–0; road: 4–2–0)
#	**Date**	**Visitor**	**Score**	**Home**	**OT**	**Decision**	**Attendance**	**Record**	**Pts**	**Recap**
14	November 5	Nashville Predators	0 - 4	Anaheim Ducks		Pekka Rinne	14,298	6-7-1	13
15	November 7	Nashville Predators	3 - 1	Los Angeles Kings		Dan Ellis	15,237	7-7-1	15
16	November 10	Nashville Predators	3 - 4	San Jose Sharks		Dan Ellis	17,562	7-8-1	15
17	November 12	Nashville Predators	3 - 1	St. Louis Blues		Pekka Rinne	19,150	8-8-1	17
18	November 14	Montreal Canadiens	0 - 2	Nashville Predators		Pekka Rinne	15,604	9-8-1	19
19	November 17	San Jose Sharks	3 - 4	Nashville Predators		Pekka Rinne	13,324	10-8-1	21
20	November 19	New Jersey Devils	2 - 3	Nashville Predators	SO	Pekka Rinne	13,445	11-8-1	23
21	November 21	Columbus Blue Jackets	3 - 4	Nashville Predators	SO	Pekka Rinne	13,790	12-8-1	25
22	November 23	Detroit Red Wings	1 - 3	Nashville Predators		Pekka Rinne	14,410	13-8-1	27
23	November 25	Nashville Predators	4 - 3	Colorado Avalanche	OT	Pekka Rinne	12,356	14-8-1	29
24	November 27	St. Louis Blues	3 - 1	Nashville Predators		Pekka Rinne	13,170	14-9-1	29
25	November 28	Florida Panthers	1 - 3	Nashville Predators		Dan Ellis	14,120	15-9-1	31
26	November 30	Calgary Flames	5 - 0	Nashville Predators		Pekka Rinne	10,581	15-10-1	31

December: 9–4–2 (home: 3–2–1; road: 6–2–1)
#	**Date**	**Visitor**	**Score**	**Home**	**OT**	**Decision**	**Attendance**	**Record**	**Pts**	**Recap**
27	December 2	Nashville Predators	4 - 5	Minnesota Wild	OT	Pekka Rinne	18,071	15-10-2	32
28	December 4	Nashville Predators	4 - 1	Chicago Blackhawks		Dan Ellis	20,887	16-10-2	34
29	December 5	Minnesota Wild	5 - 3	Nashville Predators		Dan Ellis	13,145	16-11-2	34
30	December 8	Vancouver Canucks	2 - 4	Nashville Predators		Pekka Rinne	12,565	17-11-2	36
31	December 10	Columbus Blue Jackets	3 - 4	Nashville Predators	SO	Pekka Rinne	14,601	18-11-2	38
32	December 12	Detroit Red Wings	3 - 2	Nashville Predators	OT	Pekka Rinne	16,673	18-11-3	39
33	December 14	Nashville Predators	5 - 3	Columbus Blue Jackets		Dan Ellis	12,856	19-11-3	41
34	December 15	Tampa Bay Lightning	4 - 7	Nashville Predators		Pekka Rinne	15,084	20-11-3	43
35	December 17	Nashville Predators	6 - 3	Edmonton Oilers		Dan Ellis	16,839	21-11-3	45
36	December 19	Nashville Predators	5 - 3	Calgary Flames		Dan Ellis	19,289	22-11-3	47
37	December 22	Nashville Predators	1 - 4	Vancouver Canucks		Dan Ellis	18,810	22-12-3	47
38	December 26	Chicago Blackhawks	4 - 1	Nashville Predators		Pekka Rinne	17,113	22-13-3	47
39	December 27	Nashville Predators	4 - 5	Chicago Blackhawks		Dan Ellis	21,746	22-14-3	47
40	December 29	Nashville Predators	4 - 3	St. Louis Blues		Pekka Rinne	19,150	23-14-3	49
41	December 31	Nashville Predators	2 - 1	Columbus Blue Jackets	OT	Dan Ellis	18,221	24-14-3	51

January: 6–7–0 (home: 3–3–0; road: 3–4–0)
#	**Date**	**Visitor**	**Score**	**Home**	**OT**	**Decision**	**Attendance**	**Record**	**Pts**	**Recap**
42	January 2	Anaheim Ducks	1 - 3	Nashville Predators		Pekka Rinne	16,654	25-14-3	53
43	January 5	Calgary Flames	3 - 1	Nashville Predators		Dan Ellis	15,030	25-15-3	53
44	January 7	Carolina Hurricanes	2 - 4	Nashville Predators		Pekka Rinne	14,910	26-15-3	55
45	January 9	Anaheim Ducks	3 - 2	Nashville Predators		Pekka Rinne	17,113	26-16-3	55
46	January 11	Nashville Predators	3 - 2	Vancouver Canucks		Dan Ellis	18,810	27-16-3	57
47	January 12	Nashville Predators	5 - 3	Edmonton Oilers		Pekka Rinne	16,839	28-16-3	59
48	January 15	Nashville Predators	1 - 0	Calgary Flames		Dan Ellis	19,289	29-16-3	61
49	January 18	Toronto Maple Leafs	4 - 3	Nashville Predators		Dan Ellis	16,501	29-17-3	61
50	January 21	Nashville Predators	2 - 4	Phoenix Coyotes		Dan Ellis	9,412	29-18-3	61
51	January 22	Nashville Predators	1 - 2	Colorado Avalanche		Pekka Rinne	12,452	29-19-3	61
52	January 26	Nashville Predators	2 - 3	Columbus Blue Jackets		Pekka Rinne	13,775	29-20-3	61
53	January 29	Nashville Predators	2 - 4	Detroit Red Wings		Dan Ellis	20,066	29-21-3	61
54	January 30	Atlanta Thrashers	3 - 4	Nashville Predators		Pekka Rinne	16,646	30-21-3	63

February: 3–2–2 (home: 1–1–1; road: 2–1–1)
#	**Date**	**Visitor**	**Score**	**Home**	**OT**	**Decision**	**Attendance**	**Record**	**Pts**	**Recap**
55	February 2	Phoenix Coyotes	1 - 0	Nashville Predators	SO	Pekka Rinne	14,196	30-21-4	64
56	February 4	Colorado Avalanche	3 - 5	Nashville Predators		Pekka Rinne	17,113	31-21-4	66
57	February 6	San Jose Sharks	4 - 3	Nashville Predators		Pekka Rinne	16,007	31-22-4	66
58	February 9	Nashville Predators	3 - 4	New York Islanders	SO	Pekka Rinne	11,487	31-22-5	67
59	February 10	Nashville Predators	2 - 1	New York Rangers		Dan Ellis	13,128	32-22-5	69
60	February 12	Nashville Predators	2 - 5	New Jersey Devils		Pekka Rinne	17,625	32-23-5	69
61	February 14	Nashville Predators	4 - 3	Pittsburgh Penguins	SO	Dan Ellis	17,132	33-23-5	71

March: 11–5–1 (home: 6–3–1; road: 5–2–0)
#	**Date**	**Visitor**	**Score**	**Home**	**OT**	**Decision**	**Attendance**	**Record**	**Pts**	**Recap**
62	March 2	Edmonton Oilers	3 - 4	Nashville Predators		Pekka Rinne	15,682	34-23-5	73
63	March 4	Los Angeles Kings	2 - 4	Nashville Predators		Pekka Rinne	15,653	35-23-5	75
64	March 5	Nashville Predators	2 - 5	Detroit Red Wings		Dan Ellis	19,608	35-24-5	75
65	March 7	Vancouver Canucks	4 - 2	Nashville Predators		Pekka Rinne	16,096	35-25-5	75
66	March 9	Nashville Predators	2 - 1	Atlanta Thrashers		Dan Ellis	11,106	36-25-5	77
67	March 11	Nashville Predators	5 - 8	San Jose Sharks		Dan Ellis	17,562	36-26-5	77
68	March 12	Nashville Predators	1 - 0	Anaheim Ducks		Pekka Rinne	15,077	37-26-5	79
69	March 14	Nashville Predators	3 - 2	Los Angeles Kings		Pekka Rinne	18,118	38-26-5	81
70	March 16	Philadelphia Flyers	3 - 4	Nashville Predators	SO	Pekka Rinne	16,585	39-26-5	83
71	March 18	Minnesota Wild	0 - 5	Nashville Predators		Pekka Rinne	16,615	40-26-5	85
72	March 20	Columbus Blue Jackets	0 - 1	Nashville Predators	OT	Pekka Rinne	16,363	41-26-5	87
73	March 21	Nashville Predators	3 - 2	St. Louis Blues		Pekka Rinne	19,153	42-26-5	89
74	March 23	Dallas Stars	3 - 1	Nashville Predators		Pekka Rinne	15,501	42-27-5	89
75	March 25	Phoenix Coyotes	3 - 4	Nashville Predators	SO	Pekka Rinne	15,970	43-27-5	91
76	March 27	Detroit Red Wings	1 - 0	Nashville Predators	SO	Pekka Rinne	17,113	43-27-6	92
77	March 29	Nashville Predators	3 - 2	Florida Panthers	OT	Dan Ellis	13,679	44-27-6	94
78	March 30	Los Angeles Kings	2 - 0	Nashville Predators		Pekka Rinne	14,443	44-28-6	94

April: 3–1–0 (home: 2–0–0; road: 1–1–0)
#	**Date**	**Visitor**	**Score**	**Home**	**OT**	**Decision**	**Attendance**	**Record**	**Pts**	**Recap**
79	April 1	St. Louis Blues	2 - 3	Nashville Predators		Pekka Rinne	15,242	45-28-6	96
80	April 3	Nashville Predators	4 - 3	Detroit Red Wings	OT	Pekka Rinne	20,066	46-28-6	98
81	April 7	Nashville Predators	2 - 5	Phoenix Coyotes		Pekka Rinne	17,136	46-29-6	98
82	April 10	St. Louis Blues	1 - 2	Nashville Predators	SO	Pekka Rinne	16,702	47-29-6	100

**Legend**: Win (2 points) Loss (0 points) Overtime/shootout loss (1 point)

== Playoffs ==
2010 Stanley Cup playoffs

Western Conference Quarter-final vs. (2) Chicago Blackhawks - Blackhawks won series 4–2
Game	Date	Opponent	Score	OT	Decision	Arena	Attendance	Series	Recap
1	April 16	@ Chicago Blackhawks	4 – 1		Rinne	United Center	22,256	Predators lead 1–0
2	April 18	@ Chicago Blackhawks	2 – 0		Rinne	United Center	22,158	Series tied 1–1
3	April 20	Chicago Blackhawks	4 – 1		Rinne	Bridgestone Arena	16,075	Predators lead 2–1
4	April 22	Chicago Blackhawks	3 – 0		Rinne	Bridgestone Arena	17,113	Series tied 2–2
5	April 24	@ Chicago Blackhawks	5 – 4	4:07 OT	Rinne	United Center	22,115	Blackhawks lead 3–2
6	April 26	Chicago Blackhawks	5 – 3		Rinne	Bridgestone Arena	17,113	Blackhawks win 4–2

== Player stats ==
=== Skaters ===
Note: GP = Games played; G = Goals; A = Assists; Pts = Points; +/− = Plus/minus; PIM = Penalty minutes

Regular season

Player	GP	G	A	Pts	+/−	PIM
Steve Sullivan	82	17	34	51	2	35
Patric Hornqvist	80	30	21	51	18	40
Martin Erat	74	21	28	49	-7	50
Jason Arnott	63	19	27	46	0	26
Jean-Pierre Dumont	74	17	28	45	8	20
Shea Weber	78	16	27	43	0	36
David Legwand	82	11	27	38	-5	24
Ryan Suter	82	4	33	37	4	48
Joel Ward	71	13	21	34	-5	18
Marcel Goc	73	12	18	30	10	14
Dan Hamhuis	78	5	19	24	4	49
Cody Franson	61	6	15	21	15	16
Jordin Tootoo	51	6	10	16	2	40
Colin Wilson	35	8	7	15	-2	7
Jerred Smithson	69	9	4	13	-4	54
Francis Bouillon	81	3	8	11	5	50
Kevin Klein	81	1	10	11	-13	27
Cal O'Reilly	31	2	9	11	1	4
Ryan Jones^{‡}	41	7	4	11	3	18
Dave Scatchard	16	3	2	5	3	17
Dustin Boyd^{†}	18	3	2	5	1	4
Michael Santorelli	25	2	1	3	-8	8
Andreas Thuresson	22	1	2	3	-5	4
Nick Spaling	28	0	3	3	3	0
Alexander Sulzer	20	0	2	2	4	4
Wade Belak	39	0	2	2	0	58
Denis Grebeshkov^{†}	4	1	1	2	0	6
Ben Guite	6	0	0	0	-3	4
Triston Grant	3	0	0	0	-1	9
Peter Olvecky	1	0	0	0	0	0
Teemu Laakso	7	0	0	0	-2	2

Playoffs

Player	GP	G	A	Pts	+/−	PIM
David Legwand	6	2	5	7	5	8
Martin Erat	6	4	1	5	-2	4
Jean-Pierre Dumont	6	2	2	4	3	0
Joel Ward	6	2	2	4	1	2
Steve Sullivan	6	0	3	3	2	2
Shea Weber	6	2	1	3	-1	4
Jason Arnott	6	2	0	2	-3	0
Dan Hamhuis	6	0	2	2	-1	2
Denis Grebeshkov	2	0	2	2	2	0
Kevin Klein	6	0	2	2	1	4
Jerred Smithson	6	1	0	1	-1	6
Marcel Goc	6	0	1	1	-2	2
Jordin Tootoo	6	0	1	1	0	2
Cody Franson	4	0	1	1	1	2
Patric Hornqvist	2	0	1	1	-2	4
Colin Wilson	6	0	1	1	-1	0
Francis Bouillon	6	0	0	0	-1	6
Ryan Suter	6	0	0	0	-1	0
Dustin Boyd	4	0	0	0	-1	0
Nick Spaling	6	0	0	0	0	0

=== Goaltenders ===
Note: GP = Games played; TOI = Time on ice (minutes); W = Wins; L = Losses; OT = Overtime losses; GA = Goals against; GAA= Goals against average; SA= Shots against; SV= Saves; Sv% = Save percentage; SO= Shutouts

Regular season

Player	GP	TOI	W	L	OT	GA	GAA	SA	Sv%	SO	G	A	PIM
Pekka Rinne	58	3246	32	16	5	137	2.53	1541	.911	7	0	0	2
Dan Ellis	31	1715	15	13	1	77	2.69	848	.909	1	0	1	4

Playoffs

Player	GP	TOI	W	L	GA	GAA	SA	Sv%	SO	G	A	PIM
Pekka Rinne	6	358	2	4	16	2.68	179	.911	0	0	0	0

^{†}Denotes player spent time with another team before joining Predators. Stats reflect time with the Predators only.
^{‡}Traded mid-season
Bold/italics denotes franchise record

== Awards ==
Regular season
Player	Award	Awarded
Pekka Rinne	NHL First Star of the Week	November 2, 2009
Patric Hornqvist	NHL Third Star of the Week	December 21, 2009
Pekka Rinne	NHL Third Star of the Week	March 15, 2010
Pekka Rinne	NHL First Star of the Week	March 22, 2010

== Transactions ==
The Predators have been involved in the following transactions during the 2009–10 season.

=== Trades ===
Date	Details
June 27, 2009	To Tampa Bay Lightning 5th-round pick (148th overall) in 2009	To Nashville Predators 5th-round pick in 2010
June 27, 2009	To St. Louis Blues 7th-round pick (202nd overall) in 2009	To Nashville Predators 7th-round pick in 2010
March 1, 2010	To Edmonton Oilers 2nd-round pick in 2010	To Nashville Predators Denis Grebeshkov
March 3, 2010	To Calgary Flames 4th-round pick in 2010	To Nashville Predators Dustin Boyd

=== Free agents acquired ===
Player	Former team	Contract terms
Ben Guite	Colorado Avalanche	1 year, $550,000 2-way contract
Peter Olvecky	Minnesota Wild	1 year, $500,000 2-way contract
Ben Eaves	Espoo Blues	1 year, $600,000 2-way contract
Marcel Goc	San Jose Sharks	1 year, $550,000 2-way contract
Francis Bouillon	Montreal Canadiens	1 year, $750,000
Dave Scatchard	Milwaukee Admirals	1 year, $550,000 2-way contract

=== Free agents lost ===
Player	New team	Contract terms
Greg Zanon	Minnesota Wild	3 years, $5.8 million
Vernon Fiddler	Phoenix Coyotes	2 years, $2.2 million
Ville Koistinen	Florida Panthers	2 years, $2.4 million
Scott Nichol	San Jose Sharks	1 year, $750,000
Jed Ortmeyer	San Jose Sharks	1 year
Radek Bonk	Ocelari Trinec	

=== Claimed via waivers ===
Player	Former team	Date claimed off waivers

=== Lost via waivers ===
Player	New team	Date claimed off waivers
Ryan Jones	Edmonton Oilers	March 3, 2010

=== Player signings ===
Player	Contract terms
Triston Grant	1 year, $500k 2-way contract
Joel Ward	2 years, $3 million
Steve Sullivan	2 years, $7.5 million
Nolan Yonkman	1 year, $500,000 2-way contract
Ryan Maki	1 year, $500,000 2-way contract
Ryan Jones	2 years, $975,000
Cal O'Reilly	2 years, $1.125 million 2-way contract
Kevin Klein	3 years, $4.05 million contract extension
Marcel Goc	1 year, $775,000 contract extension
Jordin Tootoo	2 years, $2.5 million contract extension
Pekka Rinne	2 years, $6.8 million contract extension
Ryan Thang	2 years, $1.05 million entry-level contract
Ryan Flynn	2 years, $1.05 million entry-level contract
Michael Latta	3-year entry-level contract
Gabriel Bourque	3-year entry-level contract
Charles-Olivier Roussel	3-year entry-level contract

== Draft picks ==
Nashville's picks at the 2009 NHL entry draft in Montreal, Quebec.

Round	Pick	Player	Position	Nationality	College
1	11	Ryan Ellis	(D)	Canada	Windsor Spitfires (OHL)
2	41	Zach Budish	(RW)	United States	Edina High School (USHS-MN)
2	42 (Minnesota)	Charles-Olivier Roussel	(D)	Canada	Shawinigan Cataractes (QMJHL)
3	70 (from Ottawa)	Taylor Beck	(LW)	Canada	Guelph Storm (OHL)
3	72	Michael Latta	(C)	Canada	Guelph Storm (OHL)
4	98 (from Toronto via San Jose)	Craig Smith	(C)	United States	Waterloo Black Hawks (USHL)
4	102	Mattias Ekholm	(D)	Sweden	Mora IK (HockeyAllsvenskan)
4	110 (from NY Rangers)	Nick Oliver	(C/F)	United States	Roseau High School (USHS-MN)
5	132	Gabriel Bourque	(LW)	Canada	Baie-Comeau Drakkar (QMJHL)
7	192	Cameron Reid	(C)	Canada	Westside Warriors (BCHL)

== See also ==
- 2009–10 NHL season
