= 2009–10 Chicago Blackhawks season =

Professional ice hockey team season of play

2009–10 Chicago Blackhawks
- Stanley Cup champions
- Western Conference champions
- Central Division champions
- Division: 1st Central
- Conference: 2nd Western
- 2009–10 record: 52–22–8
- Home record: 29–8–4
- Road record: 23–14–4
- Goals for: 271
- Goals against: 209

Team information
- General manager: Stan Bowman
- Coach: Joel Quenneville
- Captain: Jonathan Toews
- Alternate captains: Duncan Keith; Patrick Sharp
- Arena: United Center
- Average attendance: 21,356 (108.3%); Total: 854,267

Team leaders
- Goals: Patrick Kane (30 goals)
- Assists: Patrick Kane (58 assists)
- Points: Patrick Kane (88 points)
- Penalty minutes: Ben Eager (120)
- Plus/minus: Patrick Sharp; Marian Hossa (+24)
- Wins: Cristobal Huet; Antti Niemi (26)
- Goals against average: Antti Niemi (2.25 per game)

The 2009–10 Chicago Blackhawks season was the 84th season for the National Hockey League (NHL) franchise that was established on September 25, 1926. The season began on October 2, 2009, with a pair of games against the Florida Panthers in Helsinki, and ended on June 9, 2010, when the Blackhawks defeated the Philadelphia Flyers 4–2 in the 2010 Stanley Cup Finals, giving the organization its first NHL championship since 1961 and fourth overall. For the first time since the 1996–97 season, the Blackhawks made the playoffs in back-to-back seasons. The 2009–10 Chicago Blackhawks were voted by fans on NHL.com as one of the top 20 greatest teams in NHL history.

In May 2021, two former players from the 2009–10 Blackhawks roster publicly accused the team's video coach at the time of sexually assaulting them during this season, sparking controversy.

== Off-season ==
The Blackhawks were coming off one of their best years in recent history during the 2008–09 season, going 46–24–12 and finishing with 104 points. They finished second in the Central Division and fourth in the Western Conference. The Blackhawks' 46 wins were their most since winning 47 in the 1992–93 NHL season. The Blackhawks' reached the 100-point mark for the first time since 1992–93 season and improved by 16 points over the past season, when their 88-point total left them three points away of a playoff berth. They were the only NHL to improve on its record in each of the previous four seasons. The Blackhawks made it to the playoffs for the first time since 2002 and it was their second playoff appearance in the previous 11 years. In the playoffs, the Blackhawks defeated the Calgary Flames and the Vancouver Canucks before losing to the Detroit Red Wings in the Western Conference Finals. It was the Blackhawks' first appearance in the Western Conference Finals since 1995.

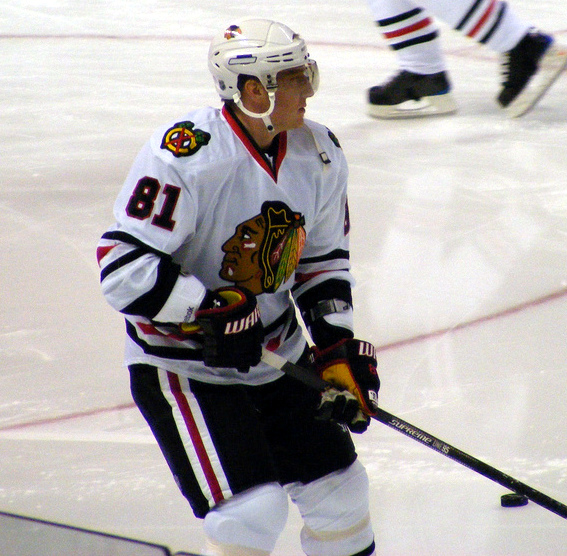
Marian Hossa was a key addition to the Blackhawks as he led his previous two teams to the Stanley Cup Finals.

The Blackhawks, however, had a turbulent off-season. The Blackhawks saw Assistant General Manager Rick Dudley resign from his position and join the Atlanta Thrashers as associate general manager. On July 1, 2009, the Blackhawks made a significant acquisition to the team when they signed five-time NHL All-Star Marian Hossa to a 12-year contract worth $62.8 million. At the time, it was the most lucrative deal in team history. The signing of Hossa by the Blackhawks coincided with the departure of the team's leading scorer from the previous season, Martin Havlat, to the Minnesota Wild. Other key additions for the Blackhawks were John Madden and Tomas Kopecky. Along with Havlat, Nikolai Khabibulin, Samuel Pahlsson and Matt Walker were notable losses for the team.

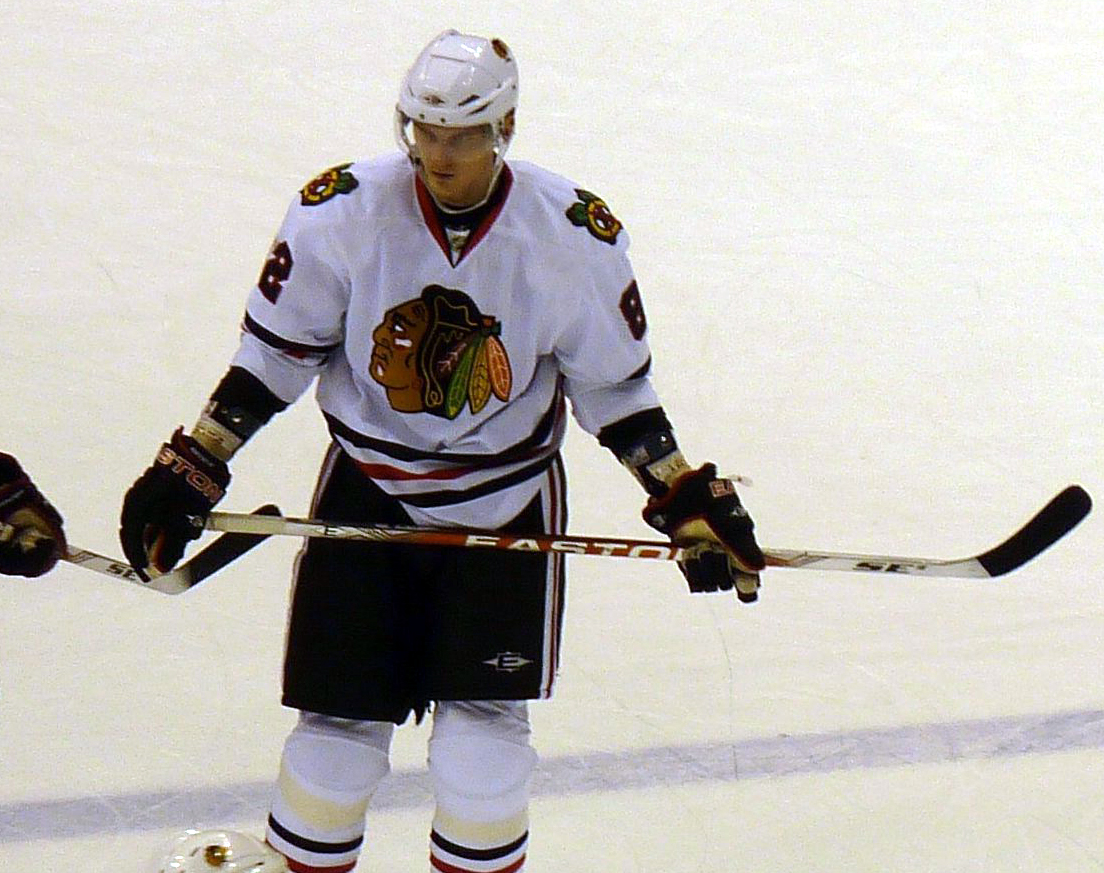
Tomas Kopecky was also another key addition, previously helping the Detroit Red Wings win the Stanley Cup in 2008.

Shortly after signing Hossa, the team disclosed that he was still rehabilitating a shoulder injury he sustained during the previous post-season. He underwent shoulder surgery and ended up missing the first 22 games of the season. During the off-season, The NHL Players' Association (NHLPA) filed a grievance, stating that the Blackhawks missed the deadline for giving qualifying offers to restricted free agents. This caused General Manager Dale Tallon to quickly sign eight players to make sure they did not end up as unrestricted free agents. The mistake proved to be a large influence in the removing of Tallon as general manager. He was replaced with Stan Bowman, the assistant general manager and son of Hockey Hall of Fame coach Scotty Bowman. The NHL also investigated Hossa's contract as well. The Blackhawks named Kevin Cheveldayoff, the general manager of the Chicago Wolves of the American Hockey League (AHL), as assistant general manager. The team also promoted Assistant Coach Marc Bergevin to the position of director of player personnel.

In August, the Blackhawks saw star player Patrick Kane embroiled in controversy when he and his cousin were arrested in Buffalo, New York. Kane was apprehended in the early morning hours after allegedly punching a cab driver when he claimed to not have proper change for their trip fare. Kane was charged with second-degree robbery, a Class C felony and fourth-degree criminal mischief and theft-of-services, both of which were Class A misdemeanors. He pleaded not guilty. On August 17, Kane apologized for the arrest. Kane and his cousin appeared before a grand jury on August 19. While they were cleared of any felony charges, the two were still indicted on misdemeanor assault, theft and harassment charges. Kane and his cousin reiterated their not guilty pleas when appearing in court the next day. On August 27, Kane and his cousin pleaded guilty to noncriminal disorderly conduct charges, and were both given conditional discharges.

The Blackhawks entered the 2009–10 season with high expectations. Bob Duff of NBC Sports predicted that the Blackhawks would finish with 101 points, finish second in the division and be a fourth seed in the Western Conference. Jim Neveau of The Hockey Writer's wrote that the Blackhawks would win the division and be a second seed in the conference.

== Regular season ==
- On October 12, the Calgary Flames scored the first five goals in the first period, but the Blackhawks rallied to win 6–5 in overtime.
- On November 25, the Blackhawks scored three short-handed goals in a 7–2 win over the San Jose Sharks
- On April 6, the Blackhawks won their 50th game of the season against the Dallas Stars, setting a new franchise record for wins in a season.
- On April 7, the 'Hawks notched their 109th point of the season against the St. Louis Blues, setting another franchise record.
- On April 9, the 'Hawks won their 23rd game of the season on the road against the Colorado Avalanche, setting yet another franchise record.

The 'Hawks had solid goaltending during the regular season, finishing first in the League in shutouts, with 11. They also led the NHL in shorthanded goals scored, with 13.

== Playoffs ==
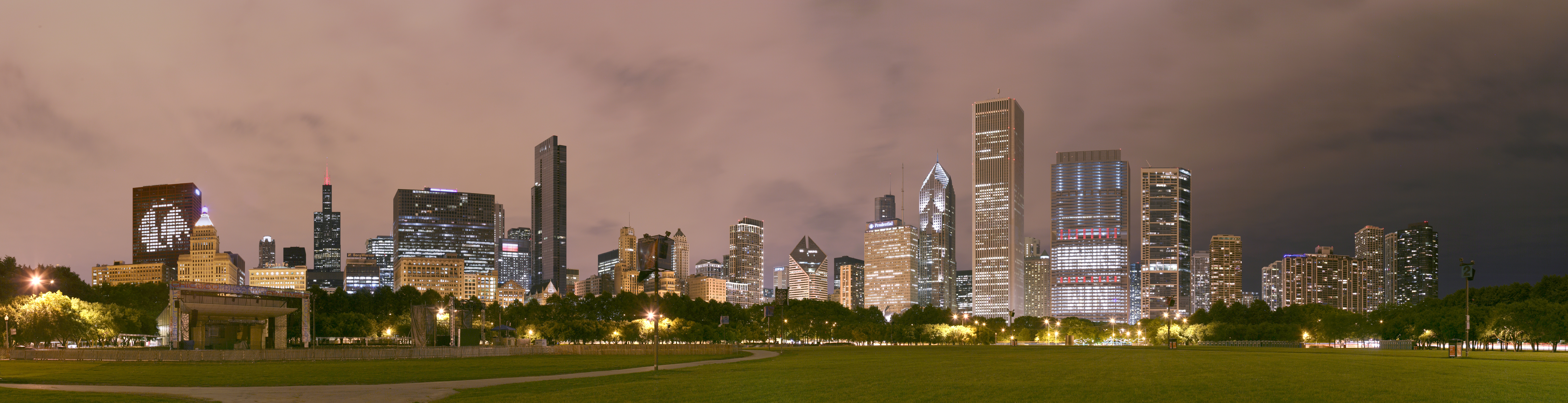
Chicago skyline with the CNA Center showing the Chicago Blackhawks' logo, the Smurfit-Stone Building saying Go Hawks and the Blue Cross Blue Shield Tower saying Hawks win the night after the Chicago Blackhawks won the 2010 Stanley Cup Finals, viewed from the Petrillo Music Shell lawn in Grant Park

- The Chicago Blackhawks have qualified for the playoffs in back-to-back years for the first time since 1996 and 1997.
- The Blackhawks have won their division for the first time since the 1992–93 season.
- The Blackhawks have reached the Western Conference Finals for the 2nd year in a row.
- On May 18, the Blackhawks tied an NHL playoff record of 7 straight wins on the road.
- Jonathan Toews set a franchise playoff record on May 21 by earning a point in 12 consecutive games, breaking Stan Mikita's record. His streak ended at 13 games after failing to register a point in game one of the 2010 Stanley Cup Finals
- On May 23, the Blackhawks won their first Conference Final since the 1991–92 season.
- Marian Hossa became the first player in history to make three consecutive Stanley Cup Finals with three different teams after accomplishing the feat with the 2008 Pittsburgh Penguins and 2009 Detroit Red Wings
- Jonathan Toews became the 25th member of hockey's Triple Gold Club after winning the Stanley Cup with the Blackhawks, an Olympic gold medal with Canada earlier in the year, and a World Championship, also with Canada, in 2007.
- The Stanley Cup win gave the city of Chicago the distinction of being the only city to have at least a championship in each of the four professional sports leagues since 1985, following championships by the Bears in Super Bowl XX, the Bulls in the 1990s, (1991, 1992, 1993, 1996, 1997, 1998) and the White Sox in 2005.

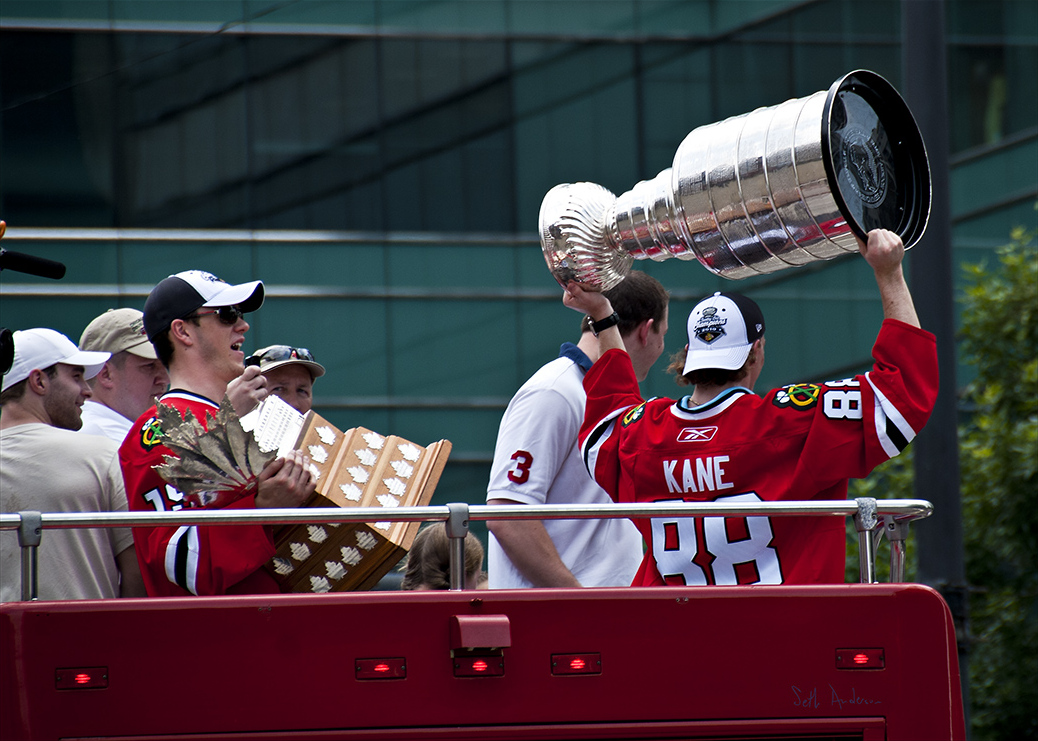
Patrick Kane hoisting the Stanley Cup and Jonathan Toews holding the Conn Smythe Playoff MVP Trophy, during the Blackhawks' parade and rally.

== Sexual abuse scandal ==
On May 7, 2021, a former Blackhawks player accused former video coach from 2008–2010, Brad Aldrich, of sexually assaulting him in May 2010 during the 2010 playoffs, initially staying anonymous under the moniker "John Doe", alleging that Aldrich also threatened him physically, emotionally, and financially after an off-ice assault at Aldrich's apartment. John Doe filed a lawsuit against the Blackhawks for failing to adequately address Aldrich's wrongdoings or to file police reports.

According to a months-long independent investigation by law firm Jenner & Block that was sanctioned by the team, on May 23, 2010, the same day the Blackhawks finished a four game sweep of the top-seeded San Jose Sharks in the Western Conference Finals to clinch their spot in the finals for the first time since 1992, Blackhawks executives held a meeting about the sexual assault claims and decided they would not address them until after the Stanley Cup Finals and not risk messing up team chemistry. The matter was not discussed again, and on June 14, five days after Chicago won the Stanley Cup against the Philadelphia Flyers in six games, the Blackhawks human resources director gave Aldrich the option to resign or face termination if John Doe's claims turned out to be true. Aldrich chose to resign and was permitted to participate in postseason celebrations, according to the investigation findings. He then went on to work for University of Notre Dame (where he previously worked from 2006–2008) and later Miami University. He resigned from his position at Miami University in November 2012 after he was accused of sexual assault there, and was convicted of having sexual contact with a minor in September 2013 while serving as a high school assistant coach in Houghton, Michigan in March 2013. As a result, Aldrich is accused or convicted of sexual assaults in connection with coaching jobs at the NHL, college, and high school levels. He served nine months in prison, being released in June 2014, required to register as a sex offender in the state of Michigan and serve five years of probation, which concluded in January 2019. On October 27, 2021, Kyle Beach gave an interview on SportsCentre confirming that he was John Doe, and spoke about his experiences with the Blackhawks organization after the fact.

In the fallout of the investigation, on October 26, 2021, the Blackhawks announced that general manager and hockey operations president Stan Bowman and senior vice president of hockey operations Al MacIsaac, the two remaining executives from the 2009–10 team, resigned. The Blackhawks appointed Kyle Davidson to serve as the team's interim general manager. The NHL also fined the Blackhawks $2 million for "inadequate internal procedures and insufficient and untimely response in the handling of matters related to former video coach Brad Aldrich's employment." Quenneville, who was by then the head coach of the Florida Panthers after being fired by the Blackhawks on November 6, 2018, for unrelated reasons, resigned from that position with the Panthers on October 28 after meeting with NHL commissioner Gary Bettman. Blackhawks owner Rocky Wirtz also requested that the engraving of Aldrich's name be redacted from the Stanley Cup (which was eventually granted days later as the 2020–21 Tampa Bay Lightning were added). The Blackhawks reached a confidential settlement with Beach on December 15. The second case filed by the former Michigan high school student was dismissed on December 27.

On February 3, 2022, Blackhawks owner Rocky Wirtz refused to address the controversy and became aggravated during a town hall meeting. CEO Danny Wirtz, Rocky's son, offered to explain what the team is doing to move forward to prevent future abuse from occurring at another meeting. That same day after the town hall event, reports surfaced about three more lawsuits potentially coming by a John Doe 3, a former student at Miami University whom Aldrich assaulted in November 2012; another former Blackhawks prospect from 2010 referred to as "Black Ace 1", who claimed no physical assault ever happened between him and Aldrich but was on the receiving end of inappropriate text messages from him; and former Blackhawks assistant/skills coach from 2008–2011 Paul Vincent, who claimed the Blackhawks management blacklisted him from the organization for alerting them about the allegations and pressuring them to respond to Aldrich's misdeeds in the May 23, 2010 meeting.

On November 5, 2023, another former Blackhawks prospect filed a negligence lawsuit against the team for suppressing his complaints of sexual harassment and physical threats of violence from Aldrich in May 2010 during the 2010 playoffs.

On July 1, 2024, the NHL announced Bowman, MacIsaac and Quenneville, would be reinstated into the league and allowed to sign contracts with other teams. Bowman was hired as general manager of the Edmonton Oilers on July 24, succeeding Ken Holland, who resigned from his role earlier in the 2024 off-season.

In March 2025, Bowman filed a motion to quash a subpoena for his deposition in the second sexual assault lawsuit related to his time at the Blackhawks, arguing that he was not properly served the subpoena and lack of jurisdiction because of his Canadian citizenship and current residence in Edmonton. The Blackhawks reached an undisclosed out-of-court settlement with "Black Ace 1" in September 2025.

On May 8, 2025, Quenneville was hired as head coach of the Anaheim Ducks, replacing Greg Cronin.

== Schedule and results ==
=== Division standings ===
Central Division
		GP	W	L	OTL	GF	GA	Pts
**1**	**y – Chicago Blackhawks**	**82**	**52**	**22**	**8**	**271**	**209**	**112**
**2**	**Detroit Red Wings**	**82**	**44**	**24**	**14**	**229**	**216**	**102**
**3**	**Nashville Predators**	**82**	**47**	**29**	**6**	**225**	**225**	**100**
4	St. Louis Blues	82	40	32	10	225	223	90
5	Columbus Blue Jackets	82	32	35	15	216	259	79

=== Conference standings ===
Western Conference
R		Div	GP	W	L	OTL	GF	GA	Pts
**1**	**z – San Jose Sharks**	**PA**	**82**	**51**	**20**	**11**	**264**	**215**	113
**2**	**y – Chicago Blackhawks**	**CE**	**82**	**52**	**22**	**8**	**271**	**209**	112
**3**	**y – Vancouver Canucks**	**NW**	**82**	**49**	**28**	**5**	**272**	**222**	103
**4**	**Phoenix Coyotes**	**PA**	**82**	**50**	**25**	**7**	**225**	**202**	107
**5**	**Detroit Red Wings**	**CE**	**82**	**44**	**24**	**14**	**229**	**216**	102
**6**	**Los Angeles Kings**	**PA**	**82**	**46**	**27**	**9**	**241**	**219**	101
**7**	**Nashville Predators**	**CE**	**82**	**47**	**29**	**6**	**225**	**225**	100
**8**	**Colorado Avalanche**	**NW**	**82**	**43**	**30**	**9**	**244**	**233**	95
8.5
9	Calgary Flames	NW	82	40	32	10	225	223	90
10	St. Louis Blues	CE	82	40	32	10	204	210	90
11	Anaheim Ducks	PA	82	39	32	11	238	251	89
12	Dallas Stars	PA	82	37	31	14	237	254	88
13	Minnesota Wild	NW	82	38	36	8	219	246	84
14	Columbus Blue Jackets	CE	82	32	35	15	216	259	79
15	Edmonton Oilers	NW	82	27	47	8	214	284	62

bold – Qualified for playoffs; y – Won division; z – Won conference (and division)

=== Pre-season ===
Legend: Win (2 points) Loss (0 points) Overtime/shootout loss (1 point)

2009 Pre-season Game Log: 1–2–1 (Home: 1–0–1; Road: 0–2–0)
#	**Date**	**Opponent**	**Score**	**OT**	**Decision**	**Arena**	**Attendance**	**Record**	**Recap**
1	September 19	Washington Capitals	3–2	OT	Huet	United Center	19,734	0–0–1	OTL1
2	September 20	@ Minnesota Wild	3–0		Niemi	Xcel Energy Center	N/A	0–1–1	L1
3	September 23	@ Washington Capitals	6–2		Crawford	Verizon Center	18,229	0–2–1	L2
4	September 25	Minnesota Wild	4–3		Huet	United Center	19,415	1–2–1	W1
5*	September 28*	@ HC Davos (Switzerland)	9–2		Niemi	Hallenstadion	7,252	–	W2
6*	September 29*	@ ZSC Lions (Switzerland)	2–1		Huet	Hallenstadion	9,744	–	L1
*Played in Zürich, Switzerland.

*Games against non-NHL teams don't count in the standings.

=== Regular season ===
2009–10 Game Log

October: 8–4–1 (Home: 6–2–1; Road: 2–2–0 ) Pts. 17
#	**Date**	**Opponent**	**Score**	**OT**	**Decision**	**Arena**	**Attendance**	**Record**	**Pts**	**Recap**
1	October 2*	Florida Panthers	4–3	SO	Huet	Hartwall Areena	12,056	0–0–1	1	OTL1
2	October 3*	@ Florida Panthers	4–0		Niemi	Hartwall Areena	11,526	1–0–1	3	W1
3	October 8	@ Detroit Red Wings	3–2		Huet	Joe Louis Arena	20,066	1–1–1	3	L1
4	October 10	Colorado Avalanche	4–3	SO	Huet	United Center	20,655	2–1–1	5	W1
5	October 12	Calgary Flames	6–5	OT	Niemi	United Center	20,074	3–1–1	7	W2
6	October 14	Edmonton Oilers	4–3		Niemi	United Center	20,124	4–1–1	9	W3
7	October 15	@ Nashville Predators	3–1		Huet	Sommet Center	13,103	5–1–1	11	W4
8	October 17	Dallas Stars	4–3		Huet	United Center	20,424	5–2–1	11	L1
9	October 21	Vancouver Canucks	3–2		Niemi	United Center	20,077	5–3–1	11	L2
10	October 24	Nashville Predators	2–0		Huet	United Center	20,272	6–3–1	13	W1
11	October 26	Minnesota Wild	3–1		Huet	United Center	20,046	7–3–1	15	W2
12	October 29	@ Nashville Predators	2–0		Huet	Sommet Center	13,585	7–4–1	15	L1
13	October 30	Montreal Canadiens	3–2		Huet	United Center	20,807	8–4–1	17	W1
*Played in Helsinki, Finland.

November: 8–2–2 (Home: 4–0–0; Road: 4–2–2) Pts. 18
#	**Date**	**Opponent**	**Score**	**OT**	**Decision**	**Arena**	**Attendance**	**Record**	**Pts**	**Recap**
14	November 5	@ Phoenix Coyotes	3–1		Huet	Jobing.com Arena	10,362	8–5–1	17	L1
15	November 6	@ Colorado Avalanche	4–3	SO	Niemi	Pepsi Center	15,616	8–5–2	18	OTL1
16	November 9	Los Angeles Kings	4–1		Huet	United Center	20,293	9–5–2	20	W1
17	November 11	Colorado Avalanche	3–2	SO	Huet	United Center	20,879	10–5–2	22	W2
18	November 13	Toronto Maple Leafs	3–2		Huet	United Center	21,036	11–5–2	24	W3
19	November 15	San Jose Sharks	4–3	OT	Huet	United Center	21,130	12–5–2	26	W4
20	November 19	@ Calgary Flames	7–1		Huet	Pengrowth Saddledome	19,289	13–5–2	28	W5
21	November 21	@ Edmonton Oilers	5–2		Huet	Rexall Place	16,839	14–5–2	30	W6
22	November 22	@ Vancouver Canucks	1–0		Niemi	General Motors Place	18,810	15–5–2	32	W7
23	November 25	@ San Jose Sharks	7–2		Huet	HP Pavilion at San Jose	17,562	16–5–2	34	W8
24	November 27	@ Anaheim Ducks	3–0		Huet	Honda Center	15,068	16–6–2	34	L1
25	November 28	@ Los Angeles Kings	2–1	SO	Huet	Staples Center	18,118	16–6–3	35	OTL1

December: 11–4–0 (Home: 8–2–0; Road: 3–2–0) Pts. 22
#	**Date**	**Opponent**	**Score**	**OT**	**Decision**	**Arena**	**Attendance**	**Record**	**Pts**	**Recap**
26	December 1	Columbus Blue Jackets	4–3	SO	Huet	United Center	20,363	17–6–3	37	W1
27	December 4	Nashville Predators	4–1		Huet	United Center	20,887	17–7–3	37	L1
28	December 5	@ Pittsburgh Penguins	2–1	OT	Niemi	Mellon Arena	17,132	18–7–3	39	W1
29	December 9	New York Rangers	2–1	OT	Huet	United Center	21,022	19–7–3	41	W2
30	December 11	@ Buffalo Sabres	2–1		Huet	HSBC Arena	18,009	19–8–3	41	L1
31	December 13	Tampa Bay Lightning	4–0		Niemi	United Center	21,081	20–8–3	43	W1
32	December 16	St. Louis Blues	3–0		Huet	United Center	21,137	21–8–3	45	W2
33	December 18	Boston Bruins	5–4	SO	Niemi	United Center	21,717	22–8–3	47	W3
34	December 20	Detroit Red Wings	3–0		Huet	United Center	21,781	23–8–3	49	W4
35	December 22	San Jose Sharks	3–2		Huet	United Center	21,614	23–9–3	49	L1
36	December 23	@ Detroit Red Wings	3–0		Niemi	Joe Louis Arena	20,066	24–9–3	51	W1
37	December 26	@ Nashville Predators	4–1		Huet	Sommet Center	17,113	25–9–3	53	W2
38	December 27	Nashville Predators	5–4		Niemi	United Center	21,746	26–9–3	55	W3
39	December 29	@ Dallas Stars	5–4		Niemi	American Airlines Center	18,532	26–10–3	55	L1
40	December 31	New Jersey Devils	5–1		Huet	United Center	21,614	27–10–3	57	W1

January: 10–4–1 (Home: 3–1–0; Road: 7–3–1) Pts. 21
#	**Date**	**Opponent**	**Score**	**OT**	**Decision**	**Arena**	**Attendance**	**Record**	**Pts**	**Recap**
41	January 2	@ St. Louis Blues	6–3		Huet	Scottrade Center	19,150	28–10–3	59	W2
42	January 3	Anaheim Ducks	5–2		Niemi	United Center	21,662	29–10–3	61	W3
43	January 5	Minnesota Wild	4–1		Huet	United Center	21,381	30–10–3	63	W4
44	January 7	@ Boston Bruins	5–2		Niemi	TD Garden	17,565	31–10–3	65	W5
45	January 9	@ Minnesota Wild	6–5	SO	Huet	Xcel Energy Center	19,310	31–10–4	66	OTL1
46	January 10	Anaheim Ducks	3–1		Niemi	United Center	21,708	31–11–4	66	L1
47	January 14	Columbus Blue Jackets	3–0		Huet	United Center	21,884	32–11–4	68	W1
48	January 16	@ Columbus Blue Jackets	6–5		Huet	Nationwide Arena	18,738	33–11–4	70	W2
49	January 17	@ Detroit Red Wings	4–3	SO	Niemi	Joe Louis Arena	20,066	34–11–4	72	W3
50	January 19	@ Ottawa Senators	4–1		Huet	Scotiabank Place	17,556	34–12–4	72	L1
51	January 21	@ Calgary Flames	3–1		Niemi	Pengrowth Saddledome	19,289	35–12–4	74	W1
52	January 23	@ Vancouver Canucks	5–1		Niemi	General Motors Place	18,810	35–13–4	74	L1
53	January 26	@ Edmonton Oilers	4–2		Huet	Rexall Place	16,839	36–13–4	76	W1
54	January 28	@ San Jose Sharks	4–3	OT	Huet	HP Pavilion at San Jose	17,562	37–13–4	78	W2
55	January 30	@ Carolina Hurricanes	4–2		Huet	RBC Center	6,896	37–14–4	78	L1

February: 4–1–1 (Home: 2–1–1; Road: 2–0–0) Pts. 9
#	**Date**	**Opponent**	**Score**	**OT**	**Decision**	**Arena**	**Attendance**	**Record**	**Pts**	**Recap**
56	February 3	St. Louis Blues	3–2		Huet	United Center	21,836	37–15–4	78	L2
57	February 5	Phoenix Coyotes	2–1	SO	Huet	United Center	22,169	37–15–5	79	OTL1
58	February 6	@ St. Louis Blues	2–1		Niemi	Scottrade Center	19,150	38–15–5	81	W1
59	February 9	Dallas Stars	4–3	SO	Niemi	United Center	21,446	39–15–5	83	W2
60	February 13	Atlanta Thrashers	5–4	SO	Niemi	United Center	22,275	40–15–5	85	W3
61	February 14	@ Columbus Blue Jackets	5–4	SO	Niemi	Nationwide Arena	17,673	41–15–5	87	W4

March: 6–7–2 (Home: 4–2–1; Road: 2–5–1) Pts. 14
#	**Date**	**Opponent**	**Score**	**OT**	**Decision**	**Arena**	**Attendance**	**Record**	**Pts**	**Recap**
62	March 2	@ New York Islanders	5–3		Huet	Nassau Veterans Memorial Coliseum	13,486	41–16–5	87	L1
63	March 3	Edmonton Oilers	5–2		Huet	United Center	22,204	42–16–5	89	W1
64	March 5	Vancouver Canucks	6–3		Huet	United Center	22,235	43–16–5	91	W2
65	March 7	Detroit Red Wings	5–4		Niemi	United Center	22,309	43–17–5	91	L1
66	March 10	Los Angeles Kings	3–2	OT	Niemi	United Center	21,850	44–17–5	93	W1
67	March 13	@ Philadelphia Flyers	3–2		Huet	Wachovia Center	19,858	44–18–5	93	L1
68	March 14	Washington Capitals	4–3	OT	Niemi	United Center	22,289	44–18–6	94	OTL1
69	March 17	@ Anaheim Ducks	4–2		Crawford	Honda Center	15,243	44–19–6	94	L1
70	March 18	@ Los Angeles Kings	3–0		Niemi	Staples Center	18,118	45–19–6	96	W1
71	March 20	@ Phoenix Coyotes	5–4	SO	Niemi	Jobing.com Arena	17,534	45–19–7	97	OTL1
72	March 23	Phoenix Coyotes	2–0		Niemi	United Center	22,077	46–19–7	99	W1
73	March 25	@ Columbus Blue Jackets	8–3		Huet	Nationwide Arena	14,573	46–20–7	99	L1
74	March 28	Columbus Blue Jackets	4–2		Niemi	United Center	22,043	46–21–7	99	L2
75	March 30	@ St. Louis Blues	4–2		Niemi	Scottrade Center	19,150	46–22–7	99	L3
76	March 31	@ Minnesota Wild	4–0		Niemi	Xcel Energy Center	18,933	47–22–7	101	W1

April: 5–0–1 (Home: 2–0–1; Road: 3–0–0) Pts. 11
#	**Date**	**Opponent**	**Score**	**OT**	**Decision**	**Arena**	**Attendance**	**Record**	**Pts**	**Recap**
77	April 2	@ New Jersey Devils	2–1	SO	Niemi	Prudential Center	17,625	48–22–7	103	W2
78	April 4	Calgary Flames	4–1		Niemi	United Center	21,537	49–22–7	105	W3
79	April 6	@ Dallas Stars	5–2		Niemi	American Airlines Center	17,826	50–22–7	107	W4
80	April 7	St. Louis Blues	6–5		Niemi	United Center	22,155	51–22–7	109	W5
81	April 9	@ Colorado Avalanche	5–2		Niemi	Pepsi Center	16,327	52–22–7	111	W6
82	April 11	Detroit Red Wings	3–2	OT	Niemi	United Center	22,428	52–22–8	112	OTL1

=== Playoffs ===
2010 Stanley Cup Playoffs

Western Conference Quarterfinals vs. Nashville Predators (7) - Blackhawks won series 4–2
**Game**	**Date**	**Opponent**	**Score**	**OT**	**Decision**	**Arena**	**Attendance**	**Series**	**Recap**
1	April 16	Nashville Predators	4–1		Niemi	United Center	22,256	0–1	L1
2	April 18	Nashville Predators	2–0		Niemi	United Center	22,158	1–1	W1
3	April 20	@ Nashville Predators	4–1		Niemi	Bridgestone Arena	16,075	1–2	L1
4	April 22	@ Nashville Predators	3–0		Niemi	Bridgestone Arena	17,113	2–2	W1
5	April 24	Nashville Predators	5–4	4:07 OT	Niemi	United Center	22,115	3–2	W2
6	April 26	@ Nashville Predators	5–3		Niemi	Bridgestone Arena	17,113	4–2	W3

Western Conference Semifinals vs. Vancouver Canucks (3) - Blackhawks won series 4–2
**Game**	**Date**	**Opponent**	**Score**	**OT**	**Decision**	**Arena**	**Attendance**	**Series**	**Recap**
1	May 1	Vancouver Canucks	5–1		Niemi	United Center	22,184	0–1	L1
2	May 3	Vancouver Canucks	4–2		Niemi	United Center	22,142	1–1	W1
3	May 5	@ Vancouver Canucks	5–2		Niemi	General Motors Place	18,810	2–1	W2
4	May 7	@ Vancouver Canucks	7–4		Niemi	General Motors Place	18,810	3–1	W3
5	May 9	Vancouver Canucks	4–1		Niemi	United Center	22,192	3–2	L1
6	May 11	@ Vancouver Canucks	5–1		Niemi	General Motors Place	18,810	4–2	W1

Western Conference Finals vs. San Jose Sharks (1) - Blackhawks won series 4–0
**Game**	**Date**	**Opponent**	**Score**	**OT**	**Decision**	**Arena**	**Attendance**	**Series**	**Recap**
1	May 16	@ San Jose Sharks	2–1		Niemi	HP Pavilion at San Jose	17,562	1–0	W2
2	May 18	@ San Jose Sharks	4–2		Niemi	HP Pavilion at San Jose	17,562	2–0	W3
3	May 21	San Jose Sharks	3–2	12:24 OT	Niemi	United Center	22,311	3–0	W4
4	May 23	San Jose Sharks	4–2		Niemi	United Center	22,224	4–0	W5

Stanley Cup Finals vs. Philadelphia Flyers (E7) - Blackhawks won series 4–2
**Game**	**Date**	**Opponent**	**Score**	**OT**	**Decision**	**Arena**	**Attendance**	**Series**	**Recap**
1	May 29	Philadelphia Flyers	6–5		Niemi	United Center	22,312	1–0	W6
2	May 31	Philadelphia Flyers	2–1		Niemi	United Center	22,275	2–0	W7
3	June 2	@ Philadelphia Flyers	4–3	5:59 OT	Niemi	Wachovia Center	20,297	2–1	L1
4	June 4	@ Philadelphia Flyers	5–3		Niemi	Wachovia Center	20,304	2–2	L2
5	June 6	Philadelphia Flyers	7–4		Niemi	United Center	22,305	3–2	W1
6	June 9	@ Philadelphia Flyers	4–3	4:06 OT	Niemi	Wachovia Center	20,327	4–2	W2

**Legend**: Win Loss

== Player statistics ==
=== Skaters ===
Note: GP = Games played; G = Goals; A = Assists; Pts = Points; PIM = Penalty minutes

Regular season

Player	GP	G	A	Pts	+/−	PIM
Patrick Kane	82	30	58	88	16	20
Duncan Keith	82	14	55	69	21	51
Jonathan Toews	76	25	43	68	22	47
Patrick Sharp	82	25	41	66	24	28
Marian Hossa	57	24	27	51	24	18
Kris Versteeg	79	20	24	44	8	35
Troy Brouwer	78	22	18	40	9	66
Brian Campbell	68	7	31	38	18	18
Andrew Ladd	82	17	21	38	2	67
Dustin Byfuglien	82	17	17	34	-7	94
Brent Seabrook	78	4	26	30	20	59
John Madden	79	10	13	23	-2	12
Tomas Kopecky	74	10	11	21	0	28
Colin Fraser	70	7	12	19	6	44
Niklas Hjalmarsson	77	2	15	17	9	20
Ben Eager	60	7	9	16	9	120
Dave Bolland	39	6	10	16	5	28
Cam Barker^{‡}	51	4	10	14	7	58
Brent Sopel	73	1	7	8	3	34
Jordan Hendry	43	2	6	8	5	10
Adam Burish	13	1	3	4	2	14
Bryan Bickell	16	3	1	4	4	5
Kim Johnsson^{†}	8	1	2	3	7	4
Jake Dowell	3	1	1	2	1	5
Jack Skille	6	1	1	2	-3	0
Nick Boynton^{†}	7	0	1	1	4	12
Andrew Ebbett^{†‡}	10	1	0	1	1	2
Radek Smolenak^{‡}	1	0	0	0	0	5

Playoffs

Player	GP	G	A	Pts	+/−	PIM
Jonathan Toews	22	7	22	29	-1	4
Patrick Kane	22	10	18	28	-2	6
Patrick Sharp	22	11	11	22	10	16
Duncan Keith	22	2	15	17	2	10
Dave Bolland	22	8	8	16	6	30
Dustin Byfuglien	22	11	5	16	-4	20
Marian Hossa	22	3	12	15	7	25
Kris Versteeg	22	6	8	14	4	14
Brent Seabrook	22	4	7	11	8	14
Niklas Hjalmarsson	22	1	7	8	9	6
Troy Brouwer	19	4	4	8	-1	8
Brent Sopel	22	1	5	6	7	8
Tomas Kopecky	17	4	2	6	2	8
Andrew Ladd	19	3	3	6	4	12
Brian Campbell	19	1	4	5	11	2
Ben Eager	18	1	2	3	2	20
John Madden	22	1	1	2	-2	2
Bryan Bickell	4	0	1	1	3	2
Adam Burish	15	0	0	0	-1	2
Jordan Hendry	15	0	0	0	-4	2
Colin Fraser	3	0	0	0	0	0
Nick Boynton	3	0	0	0	2	2

=== Goaltenders ===
Note: GP = Games played; TOI = Time on ice (minutes); W = Wins; L = Losses; OT = Overtime losses; GA = Goals against; GAA= Goals against average; SA= Shots against; SV= Saves; Sv% = Save percentage; SO= Shutouts

Regular season

Player	GP	TOI	W	L	OT	GA	GAA	SA	Sv%	SO	G	A	PIM
Cristobal Huet	48	2731	26	14	4	114	2.50	1083	.895	4	0	0	4
Antti Niemi	39	2190	26	7	4	82	2.25	936	.912	7	0	1	0
Corey Crawford	1	59	0	1	0	3	3.05	35	.914	0	0	0	0

Playoffs

Player	GP	TOI	W	L	GA	GAA	SA	Sv%	SO	G	A	PIM
Antti Niemi	22	1322	16	6	58	2.63	645	.910	2	0	0	2
Cristobal Huet	1	20	0	0	0	0.00	3	1.000	0	0	0	0

^{†}Denotes player spent time with another team before joining Blackhawks. Stats reflect time with the Blackhawks only.
^{‡}Traded mid-season
Bold/italics denotes franchise record

=== Detailed records ===
Western Conference
Opponent	Home	Away	Total	Pts.	Goals scored	Goals allowed
Central Division
Chicago Blackhawks	-	-	-	-	-	-
Columbus Blue Jackets	2–1–0	2–1–0	4–2–0	8	23	24
Detroit Red Wings	1–1–1	2–1–0	3–2–1	7	18	14
Nashville Predators	2–1–0	2–1–0	4–2–0	8	15	12
St. Louis Blues	2–1–0	2–1–0	4–2–0	8	19	16
	7–4–1	8–4–0	15–8–1	31	75	66
Northwest Division
Calgary Flames	2–0–0	2–0–0	4–0–0	8	20	8
Colorado Avalanche	2–0–0	1–0–1	3–0–1	7	15	11
Edmonton Oilers	2–0–0	2–0–0	4–0–0	8	18	9
Minnesota Wild	2–0–0	1–0–1	3–0–1	7	16	8
Vancouver Canucks	1–1–0	1–1–0	2–2–0	4	10	11
	9–1–0	7–1–2	16–2–2	34	79	47
Pacific Division
Anaheim Ducks	1–1–0	0–2–0	1–3–0	2	8	12
Dallas Stars	1–1–0	1–1–0	2–2–0	4	16	14
Los Angeles Kings	2–0–0	1–0–1	3–0–1	7	11	5
Phoenix Coyotes	1–0–1	0–1–1	1–1–2	4	8	10
San Jose Sharks	1–1–0	2–0–0	3–1–0	6	17	11
	6–3–1	4–4–2	10–7–3	23	60	52

Eastern Conference
Opponent	Home	Away	Total	Pts.	Goals scored	Goals allowed
Atlantic Division
New Jersey Devils	1–0–0	1–0–0	2–0–0	4	7	2
New York Islanders	0–0–0	0–1–0	0–1–0	0	3	5
New York Rangers	1–0–0	0–0–0	1–0–0	2	2	1
Philadelphia Flyers	0–0–0	0–1–0	0–1–0	0	2	3
Pittsburgh Penguins	0–0–0	1–0–0	1–0–0	2	2	1
	2–0–0	2–2–0	4–2–0	8	16	12
Northeast Division
Boston Bruins	1–0–0	1–0–0	2–0–0	4	10	6
Buffalo Sabres	0–0–0	0–1–0	0–1–0	0	1	2
Montreal Canadiens	1–0–0	0–0–0	1–0–0	2	3	2
Ottawa Senators	0–0–0	0–1–0	0–1–0	0	1	4
Toronto Maple Leafs	1–0–0	0–0–0	1–0–0	2	3	2
	3–0–0	1–2–0	4–2–0	8	18	16
Southeast Division
Atlanta Thrashers	1–0–0	0–0–0	1–0–0	2	5	4
Carolina Hurricanes	0–0–0	0–1–0	0–1–0	0	2	4
Florida Panthers	0–0–1	1–0–0	1–0–1	3	7	3
Tampa Bay Lightning	1–0–0	0–0–0	1–0–0	2	4	0
Washington Capitals	0–0–1	0–0–0	0–0–1	1	3	4
	2–0–2	1–1–0	3–1–2	8	21	15

== Awards and records ==
=== Awards ===
Regular Season
Player	Award	Reached
Cristobal Huet	NHL First Star of the Week	December 21, 2009
Patrick Kane	NHL Second Star of the Week	December 28, 2009
Patrick Kane	NHL Third Star of the Month	December 2009
Duncan Keith	James Norris Memorial Trophy winner	June 23, 2010

Playoffs
Player	Award	Reached
Jonathan Toews	Conn Smythe Trophy	June 9, 2010

=== Milestones ===
Regular season
Player	Milestone	Reached

== Transactions ==
The Blackhawks have been involved in the following transactions during the 2009–10 season.

=== Trades ===
Date	Details
June 27, 2009	To Atlanta Thrashers 5th-round pick in 2010	To Chicago Blackhawks 6th-round pick (177th overall) in 2009
September 6, 2009	To Toronto Maple Leafs 2nd-round pick in 2010	To Chicago Blackhawks 2nd-round pick in 2011; 3rd-round pick in 2011
October 7, 2009	To Calgary Flames Aaron Johnson	To Chicago Blackhawks Kyle Greentree
February 12, 2010	To Minnesota Wild Cam Barker	To Chicago Blackhawks Kim Johnsson; Nick Leddy
March 1, 2010	To St. Louis Blues Joe Fallon	To Chicago Blackhawks Hannu Toivonen; Danny Richmond
March 2, 2010	To Anaheim Ducks Future considerations	To Chicago Blackhawks Nick Boynton

=== Free agents acquired ===
Player	Former team	Contract terms
Rob Klinkhammer	Rockford IceHogs	undisclosed
Jonathan Carlsson	Brynas IF	undisclosed
Alec Richards	Yale University	undisclosed
Marian Hossa	Detroit Red Wings	12 years, $62.8 million
Tomas Kopecky	Detroit Red Wings	2 years, $2.4 million
John Madden	New Jersey Devils	1 year, $2.75 million
Richard Petiot	Tampa Bay Lightning	1 year
Mark Cullen	Manitoba Moose	1 year
Danny Bois	Binghamton Senators	1 year
Jassen Cullimore	Florida Panthers	undisclosed
Ryan Stanton	Moose Jaw Warriors	3 year entry-level contract
Brandon Bollig	St. Lawrence University	2 year entry-level contract

=== Free agents lost ===
Player	New team	Contract terms
Matt Walker	Tampa Bay Lightning	4 years, $6.8 million
Nikolai Khabibulin	Edmonton Oilers	4 years, $15 million
Samuel Pahlsson	Columbus Blue Jackets	3 years, $7.95 million
Martin Havlat	Minnesota Wild	6 years, $30 million
Tim Brent	Toronto Maple Leafs	1 year
Pascal Pelletier	Columbus Blue Jackets	1 year, 2-way contract

=== Claimed via waivers ===
Player	Former team	Date claimed off waivers
Radek Smolenak	Tampa Bay Lightning	September 25, 2009
Andrew Ebbett	Anaheim Ducks	October 17, 2009

=== Lost via waivers ===
Player	New team	Date claimed off waivers
Radek Smolenak	Tampa Bay Lightning	October 10, 2009
Andrew Ebbett	Minnesota Wild	November 21, 2009

=== Player signings ===
Player	Contract terms
Kyle Beach	3 years
Dave Bolland	5 years, $16.875 million
Jake Dowell	2 years
Antti Niemi	1 year
Troy Brouwer	2 years, $2 million
Corey Crawford	2 years
Ben Eager	1 year, $965,000
Colin Fraser	1 year, $700,000
Aaron Johnson	1 year, $540,000
Brian Connelly	undisclosed
Cam Barker	3 years, $9.25 million
Simon Danis-Pepin	3 years
Kris Versteeg	3 years, $9.2 million
Bryan Bickell	1 year
Peter MacArthur	1 year
Jonathan Toews	5 year, $31.5 million contract extension
Duncan Keith	13 year, $72 million contract extension
Patrick Kane	5 year, $31.5 million contract extension
Ben Smith	2 years

== Draft picks ==
The 2009 NHL entry draft was hosted at Bell Centre in Montreal on June 26 and 27. The Blackhawks made a total of six picks.

Round	#	Player	Position	Nationality	College/Junior/Club team (League)
1	28	Dylan Olsen	(D)	Canada	Camrose Kodiaks (AJHL)
2	59	Brandon Pirri	(C)	Canada	Georgetown Raiders (OJHL)
3	89	Daniel Delisle	(C/LW)	United States	Totino-Grace High School (USHS-MN)
4	119	Byron Froese	(C)	Canada	Everett Silvertips (WHL)
5	149	Marcus Kruger	(C)	Sweden	Djurgardens IF (Elitserien)
6	177 (from San Jose via Columbus and Atlanta)	David Pacan	(C)	Canada	Cumberland Grads (CCHL)
7	195 (from Florida)	Paul Phillips	(D)	United States	Cedar Rapids RoughRiders (USHL)
7	209	David Gilbert	(C)	Canada	Quebec Remparts (QMJHL)

== See also ==
- 2009–10 NHL season
