= 2009–10 Colorado Avalanche season =

National Hockey League team season

2009–10 Colorado Avalanche
- Division: 2nd Northwest
- Conference: 8th Western
- 2009–10 record: 43–30–9
- Home record: 24–14–3
- Road record: 19–16–6
- Goals for: 244
- Goals against: 233

Team information
- General manager: Greg Sherman
- Coach: Joe Sacco
- Captain: Adam Foote
- Alternate captains: Milan Hejduk; Paul Stastny
- Arena: Pepsi Center
- Average attendance: 13,948 (77.4%); Total: 571,849

Team leaders
- Goals: Chris Stewart (28)
- Assists: Paul Stastny (59)
- Points: Paul Stastny (79)
- Penalty minutes: Cody McLeod (138)
- Plus/minus: Ryan Wilson (+13)
- Wins: Craig Anderson (38)
- Goals against average: Craig Anderson, Peter Budaj (2.64)

The 2009–10 Colorado Avalanche season was the franchise's 38th season, 31st in the National Hockey League (NHL) and 15th as the Colorado Avalanche.

== Off-season ==
On June 3, 2009, the Avalanche began a complete overhaul of the coaching staff by firing head coach Tony Granato, along with assistants coaches Jacques Cloutier and Dave Barr, goaltending coach Jeff Hackett, assistant to the general manager Michel Goulet and video coordinator PJ DeLuca. Also on June 3, the Avalanche hired Greg Sherman as their new general manager, replacing Francois Giguere, who had been fired in April. On June 4, Joe Sacco was hired to be the new head coach. Before Sacco's hiring, an offer had been made to former Avalanche goaltender Patrick Roy to become head coach, which Roy declined.

Defenceman Adam Foote was named team captain following the retirement of long-time captain Joe Sakic.

== Preseason ==
2009 Pre-season Game Log: 3–3–0 (Home: 3–0–0; Road: 0–3–0)

#	Date	Visitor	Score	Home	OT	Decision	Record	Recap
1	September 17	Dallas Stars	1 - 3	Colorado Avalanche		Anderson	1-0-0	
2	September 18	Colorado Avalanche	2 - 6	St. Louis Blues		Weiman	1-1-0	
3	September 20	St. Louis Blues	1 - 2	Colorado Avalanche	OT	Budaj	2-1-0	
4	September 23	Los Angeles Kings	2 - 3	Colorado Avalanche		Anderson	3-1-0	
5	September 24	Colorado Avalanche	2 - 3	Dallas Stars		Budaj	3-2-0	
6	September 26 (in Las Vegas)	Colorado Avalanche	3 - 5	Los Angeles Kings		Anderson	3-3-0	

== Regular season ==
On July 9, 2009, Avalanche captain Joe Sakic announced his retirement from the NHL after 20 seasons. The Avalanche retired Sakic's jersey #19 in a ceremony before the October 1, 2009 home opener of the 2009-10 season. On November 12, 2009, the Avalanche unveiled a new third jersey.

On February 10, 2010, Kyle Cumiskey scored just 9 seconds into the overtime period to give the Avalanche a 4-3 home win over the Atlanta Thrashers. It would prove to be the fastest overtime goal scored during the 2009-10 NHL regular season.

=== Divisional standings ===
Northwest Division
		GP	W	L	OTL	GF	GA	Pts
**1**	**y – Vancouver Canucks**	**82**	**49**	**28**	**5**	**272**	**222**	**103**
**2**	**Colorado Avalanche**	**82**	**43**	**30**	**9**	**244**	**233**	**95**
3	Calgary Flames	82	40	32	10	204	210	90
4	Minnesota Wild	82	38	36	8	219	246	84
5	Edmonton Oilers	82	27	47	8	214	284	62

=== Conference standings ===
Western Conference
R		Div	GP	W	L	OTL	GF	GA	Pts
**1**	**z – San Jose Sharks**	**PA**	**82**	**51**	**20**	**11**	**264**	**215**	113
**2**	**y – Chicago Blackhawks**	**CE**	**82**	**52**	**22**	**8**	**271**	**209**	112
**3**	**y – Vancouver Canucks**	**NW**	**82**	**49**	**28**	**5**	**272**	**222**	103
**4**	**Phoenix Coyotes**	**PA**	**82**	**50**	**25**	**7**	**225**	**202**	107
**5**	**Detroit Red Wings**	**CE**	**82**	**44**	**24**	**14**	**229**	**216**	102
**6**	**Los Angeles Kings**	**PA**	**82**	**46**	**27**	**9**	**241**	**219**	101
**7**	**Nashville Predators**	**CE**	**82**	**47**	**29**	**6**	**225**	**225**	100
**8**	**Colorado Avalanche**	**NW**	**82**	**43**	**30**	**9**	**244**	**233**	95
8.5
9	Calgary Flames	NW	82	40	32	10	225	223	90
10	St. Louis Blues	CE	82	40	32	10	204	210	90
11	Anaheim Ducks	PA	82	39	32	11	238	251	89
12	Dallas Stars	PA	82	37	31	14	237	254	88
13	Minnesota Wild	NW	82	38	36	8	219	246	84
14	Columbus Blue Jackets	CE	82	32	35	15	216	259	79
15	Edmonton Oilers	NW	82	27	47	8	214	284	62

bold – Qualified for playoffs; y – Won division; z – Won conference (and division)

=== Game log ===
Win (2 points) Loss (0 points) Overtime/shootout loss (1 point)

2009–10 Game log
October: 10–2–2 (Home: 4–0–0; Road: 6–2–2)

#	Date	Visitor	Score	Home	OT	Decision	Attendance	Record	Pts	Recap
1	October 1	San Jose Sharks	2 – 5	Colorado Avalanche		Anderson	18,007	1–0–0	2	
2	October 3	Vancouver Canucks	0 – 3	Colorado Avalanche		Anderson	13,416	2–0–0	4	
3	October 8	Colorado Avalanche	2 - 3	Nashville Predators		Anderson	14,797	2-1-0	4	
4	October 10	Colorado Avalanche	3 - 4	Chicago Blackhawks	SO	Anderson	20,655	2-1-1	5	
5	October 12	Colorado Avalanche	4 - 3	Boston Bruins		Anderson	16,393	3-1-1	7	
6	October 13	Colorado Avalanche	4 - 1	Toronto Maple Leafs		Anderson	19,148	4-1-1	9	
7	October 15	Colorado Avalanche	3 - 2	Montreal Canadiens		Anderson	21,273	5-1-1	11	
8	October 17	Colorado Avalanche	4 - 3	Detroit Red Wings	SO	Anderson	19,763	6-1-1	13	
9	October 21	Colorado Avalanche	2 - 3	Minnesota Wild	SO	Anderson	18,175	6-1-2	14	
10	October 23	Carolina Hurricanes	4 - 5	Colorado Avalanche		Anderson	13,673	7-1-2	16	
11	October 24	Detroit Red Wings	1 - 3	Colorado Avalanche		Anderson	17,690	8-1-2	18	
12	October 27	Colorado Avalanche	3 - 0	Edmonton Oilers		Anderson	16,839	9-1-2	20	
13	October 28	Colorado Avalanche	3 - 2	Calgary Flames		Anderson	19,289	10-1-2	22	
14	October 30	Colorado Avalanche	1 - 3	San Jose Sharks		Anderson	17,562	10-2-2	22	

November: 5–6–3 (Home: 3–2–2; Road: 2–4–1)

#	Date	Visitor	Score	Home	OT	Decision	Attendance	Record	Pts	Recap
15	November 1	Colorado Avalanche	0 - 3	Vancouver Canucks		Anderson	18,810	10-3-2	22	
16	November 4	Phoenix Coyotes	1 - 4	Colorado Avalanche		Budaj	11,012	11-3-2	24	
17	November 6	Chicago Blackhawks	3 - 4	Colorado Avalanche	SO	Anderson	15,616	12-3-2	26	
18	November 8	Edmonton Oilers	5 - 3	Colorado Avalanche		Anderson	12,118	12-4-2	26	
19	November 11	Colorado Avalanche	2 - 3	Chicago Blackhawks	SO	Anderson	20,879	12-4-3	27	
20	November 14	Vancouver Canucks	8 - 2	Colorado Avalanche		Anderson	15,823	12-5-3	27	
21	November 17	Colorado Avalanche	3 - 2	Calgary Flames		Anderson	19,289	13-5-3	29	
22	November 18	Colorado Avalanche	4 - 6	Edmonton Oilers		Budaj	16,839	13-6-3	29	
23	November 20	Colorado Avalanche	2 - 5	Vancouver Canucks		Anderson	18,810	13-7-3	29	
24	November 23	Philadelphia Flyers	4 - 5	Colorado Avalanche		Anderson	13,281	14-7-3	31	
25	November 25	Nashville Predators	4 - 3	Colorado Avalanche	OT	Anderson	12,356	14-7-4	32	
26	November 27	Colorado Avalanche	3 - 5	Minnesota Wild		Anderson	18,365	14-8-4	32	
27	November 28	Minnesota Wild	3 - 2	Colorado Avalanche	SO	Anderson	15,303	14-8-5	33	
28	November 30	Colorado Avalanche	3 - 0	Tampa Bay Lightning		Anderson	12,214	15-8-5	35	

December: 8–5–1 (Home: 4–3–0; Road: 4–2–1)

#	Date	Visitor	Score	Home	OT	Decision	Attendance	Record	Pts	Recap
29	December 2	Colorado Avalanche	5 - 6	Florida Panthers	SO	Anderson	12,403	15-8-6	36	
30	December 3	Colorado Avalanche	1 - 4	Pittsburgh Penguins		Budaj	16,968	15-9-6	36	
31	December 5	Colorado Avalanche	3 - 2	Columbus Blue Jackets		Budaj	14,909	16-9-6	38	
32	December 7	Colorado Avalanche	4 - 0	St. Louis Blues		Budaj	19,150	17-9-6	40	
33	December 9	Minnesota Wild	1 - 0	Colorado Avalanche		Budaj	11,435	17-10-6	40	
34	December 11	Tampa Bay Lightning	1 - 2	Colorado Avalanche	SO	Anderson	12,188	18-10-6	42	
35	December 13	Calgary Flames	2 - 3	Colorado Avalanche		Anderson	11,448	19-10-6	44	
36	December 15	Washington Capitals	6 - 1	Colorado Avalanche		Anderson	14,172	19-11-6	44	
37	December 19	Columbus Blue Jackets	2 - 5	Colorado Avalanche		Anderson	11,782	20-11-6	46	
38	December 21	Colorado Avalanche	4 - 3	Minnesota Wild		Anderson	18,244	21-11-6	48	
39	December 22	Anaheim Ducks	4 - 2	Colorado Avalanche		Anderson	12,171	21-12-6	48	
40	December 26	Dallas Stars	1 - 4	Colorado Avalanche		Budaj	18,007	22-12-6	50	
41	December 30	Colorado Avalanche	4 - 3	Ottawa Senators		Anderson	17,823	23-12-6	52	
42	December 31	Colorado Avalanche	2 - 4	Detroit Red Wings		Anderson	20,066	23-13-6	52	

January: 7–5–0 (Home: 4–3–0; Road: 3–2–0)

#	Date	Visitor	Score	Home	OT	Decision	Attendance	Record	Pts	Recap
43	January 2	Colorado Avalanche	3 - 2	Columbus Blue Jackets		Anderson	17,371	24-13-6	54	
44	January 6	New York Islanders	3 - 2	Colorado Avalanche		Anderson	13,898	24-14-6	54	
45	January 8	Colorado Avalanche	1 - 2	Carolina Hurricanes		Budaj	14,071	24-15-6	54	
46	January 9	Colorado Avalanche	4 - 3	Buffalo Sabres	SO	Anderson	18,690	25-15-6	56	
47	January 11	Colorado Avalanche	3 - 2	Calgary Flames	SO	Anderson	19,289	26-15-6	58	
48	January 16	New Jersey Devils	1 - 3	Colorado Avalanche		Anderson	17,816	27-15-6	60	
49	January 18	Edmonton Oilers	0 - 6	Colorado Avalanche		Anderson	11,232	28-15-6	62	
50	January 22	Nashville Predators	1 - 2	Colorado Avalanche		Anderson	12,452	29-15-6	64	
51	January 24	Dallas Stars	0 - 4	Colorado Avalanche		Anderson	11,741	30-15-6	66	
52	January 28	Minnesota Wild	1 - 0	Colorado Avalanche		Anderson	11,597	30-16-6	66	
53	January 29	Colorado Avalanche	2 - 3	Dallas Stars		Anderson	18,532	30-17-6	66	
54	January 31	New York Rangers	3 - 1	Colorado Avalanche		Anderson	15,264	30-18-6	66	

February: 5–2–0 (Home: 5–0–0; Road: 0–2–0)

#	Date	Visitor	Score	Home	OT	Decision	Attendance	Record	Pts	Recap
55	February 2	Columbus Blue Jackets	1 - 5	Colorado Avalanche		Anderson	11,213	31-18-6	68	
56	February 4	Colorado Avalanche	3 - 5	Nashville Predators		Anderson	17,113	31-19-6	68	
57	February 6	Edmonton Oilers	0 - 3	Colorado Avalanche		Anderson	16,571	32-18-6	70	
58	February 8	St. Louis Blues	2 - 5	Colorado Avalanche		Anderson	11,261	33-18-6	72	
59	February 10	Atlanta Thrashers	3 - 4	Colorado Avalanche	OT	Anderson	11,644	34-18-6	74	
60	February 12	Phoenix Coyotes	1 - 2	Colorado Avalanche		Anderson	14,129	35-18-6	76	
61	February 13	Colorado Avalanche	0 - 3	Los Angeles Kings		Anderson	18,118	35-20-6	76	

March: 6–8–1 (Home: 3–4–0; Road: 3–4–1)

#	Date	Visitor	Score	Home	OT	Decision	Attendance	Record	Pts	Recap
62	March 1	Detroit Red Wings	3 - 2	Colorado Avalanche		Anderson	18,007	35-21-6	76	
63	March 3	Colorado Avalanche	4 - 3	Anaheim Ducks		Anderson	14,840	36-20-6	78	
64	March 4	Colorado Avalanche	1 - 3	Phoenix Coyotes		Anderson	12,426	36-22-6	78	
65	March 6	St. Louis Blues	3 - 7	Colorado Avalanche		Anderson	18,007	37-21-6	80	
66	March 9	Vancouver Canucks	6 - 4	Colorado Avalanche		Anderson	12,861	37-23-6	80	
67	March 11	Florida Panthers	0 - 3	Colorado Avalanche		Anderson	11,458	38-22-6	82	
68	March 14	Colorado Avalanche	5 - 3	Dallas Stars		Anderson	16,246	39-22-6	84	
69	March 16	Colorado Avalanche	5 - 3	St. Louis Blues		Budaj	19,150	40-22-6	86	
70	March 17	Calgary Flames	3 - 2	Colorado Avalanche		Anderson	12,770	40-24-6	86	
71	March 21	Colorado Avalanche	2 - 5	Anaheim Ducks		Anderson	15,528	40-25-6	86	
72	March 22	Colorado Avalanche	3 - 4	Los Angeles Kings	OT	Anderson	17,845	40-24-7	87	
73	March 24	Los Angeles Kings	3 - 4	Colorado Avalanche	SO	Anderson	13,667	41-24-7	89	
74	March 27	Colorado Avalanche	2 - 6	Phoenix Coyotes		Anderson	17,188	41-26-7	89	
75	March 28	Colorado Avalanche	3 - 4	San Jose Sharks		Anderson	17,562	41-27-7	89	
76	March 31	Anaheim Ducks	5 - 2	Colorado Avalanche		Anderson	13,862	41-28-7	89	

April: 2–2–2 (Home: 1–2–1; Road: 1–0–1)

#	Date	Visitor	Score	Home	OT	Decision	Attendance	Record	Pts	Recap
77	April 2	Calgary Flames	2 - 1	Colorado Avalanche		Anderson	18,007	41-29-7	89	
78	April 4	San Jose Sharks	4 - 5	Colorado Avalanche	OT	Anderson	12,893	42-29-7	91	
79	April 6	Colorado Avalanche	4 - 3	Vancouver Canucks	SO	Anderson	18,810	43-29-7	93	
80	April 7	Colorado Avalanche	4 - 5	Edmonton Oilers	OT	Budaj	16,839	43-29-8	94	
81	April 9	Chicago Blackhawks	5 - 2	Colorado Avalanche		Budaj	16,327	43-30-8	94	
82	April 11	Los Angeles Kings	2 - 1	Colorado Avalanche	OT	Anderson	15,674	43-30-9	95	

== Playoffs ==
Key: Win Loss

2010 Stanley Cup Playoffs
Western Conference Quarterfinals: vs. (1) San Jose Sharks: Sharks win series 4–2

#	Date	Visitor	Score	Home	OT	Decision	Attendance	Series	Recap
1	April 14	Colorado Avalanche	2–1	San Jose Sharks		Anderson	17,562	Avalanche lead 1–0	
2	April 16	Colorado Avalanche	5–6	San Jose Sharks	OT	Anderson	17,562	Series tied 1–1	
3	April 18	San Jose Sharks	0–1^{*}	Colorado Avalanche	OT	Anderson	18,007	Avalanche lead 2–1	
4	April 20	San Jose Sharks	2–1	Colorado Avalanche	OT	Anderson	18,007	Series tied 2–2	
5	April 22	Colorado Avalanche	0–5	San Jose Sharks		Anderson	17,562	Sharks lead 3–2	
6	April 24	San Jose Sharks	5–2	Colorado Avalanche		Anderson	18,007	Sharks win 4–2	
^{*}Game 3 ended in overtime on an own goal when Dan Boyle accidentally put the puck into the Sharks' net. Ryan O'Reilly was credited with the goal for Colorado.

== Player statistics ==
=== Skaters ===
Note: GP = Games played; G = Goals; A = Assists; Pts = Points; +/− = Plus/minus; PIM = Penalty minutes

Regular season

Player	GP	G	A	Pts	+/−	PIM
Paul Stastny	81	20	59	79	2	50
Chris Stewart	77	28	36	64	4	73
Matt Duchene	81	24	31	55	1	16
Wojtek Wolski^{‡}	62	17	30	47	15	21
Milan Hejduk	56	23	21	44	6	10
TJ Galiardi	70	15	24	39	6	28
John-Michael Liles	59	6	25	31	-2	30
Kyle Quincey	79	6	23	29	9	76
Ryan O'Reilly	81	8	18	26	4	18
Darcy Tucker	71	10	14	24	-3	47
Ryan Wilson	61	3	18	21	13	36
Brett Clark	64	3	17	20	6	28
Kyle Cumiskey	61	7	13	20	0	20
Peter Mueller^{†}	15	9	11	20	4	8
Brandon Yip	32	11	8	19	5	22
Cody McLeod	74	7	11	18	-13	138
Scott Hannan	81	2	14	16	2	40
David Jones	23	10	6	16	1	2
Matt Hendricks	56	9	7	16	1	74
Marek Svatos	54	7	4	11	-13	35
Adam Foote	67	0	9	9	8	64
Chris Durno	41	4	4	8	3	47
Ruslan Salei	14	1	5	6	-1	10
T. J. Hensick	7	1	2	3	0	0
Ryan Stoa	12	2	1	3	-3	0
Kevin Porter^{†}	16	2	1	3	-4	0
Justin Mercier	9	1	1	2	2	0
Philippe Dupuis	4	0	1	1	1	2
David Koci	43	1	0	1	-2	84
Tom Preissing	4	0	1	1	-6	0
Stephane Yelle^{†}	11	0	1	1	0	4
Wes O'Neill	2	0	0	0	1	2
Darren Haydar	1	0	0	0	0	0
Derek Peltier	3	0	0	0	0	0
Brian Willsie	4	0	0	0	-1	0

Playoffs

Player	GP	G	A	Pts	+/−	PIM
Paul Stastny	6	1	4	5	-2	4
Brandon Yip	6	2	2	4	-3	6
Chris Stewart	6	3	0	3	-1	4
Matt Duchene	6	0	3	3	-2	0
John-Michael Liles	6	1	1	2	-2	4
Kyle Cumiskey	6	1	1	2	-7	2
TJ Galiardi	6	0	2	2	-1	6
Adam Foote	6	0	1	1	-4	10
Milan Hejduk	3	1	0	1	0	0
Marek Svatos	3	1	0	1	-1	2
Ryan Wilson	4	0	1	1	-1	0
Ryan O'Reilly	6	1	0	1	0	2
Stephane Yelle	6	0	0	0	-1	2
Darcy Tucker	6	0	0	0	-1	2
Ruslan Salei	1	0	0	0	0	0
Brett Clark	1	0	0	0	0	0
Scott Hannan	6	0	0	0	3	4
Matt Hendricks	6	0	0	0	-2	0
Kyle Quincey	6	0	0	0	2	8
Kevin Porter	4	0	0	0	-2	0
Cody McLeod	6	0	0	0	-2	5
Ryan Stoa	1	0	0	0	0	2
Chris Durno	1	0	0	0	0	0

=== Goaltenders ===
Note: GP = Games played; TOI = Time on ice (minutes); W = Wins; L = Losses; OT = Overtime losses; GA = Goals against; GAA= Goals against average; SA= Shots against; Sv% = Save percentage; SO= Shutouts; G= Goals; A= Assists; PIM= Penalties in minutes

Regular season

Player	GP	TOI	W	L	OT	GA	GAA	SA	Sv%	SO	G	A	PIM
Craig Anderson	71	4235	38	25	7	186	2.64	2233	.917	7	0	3	16
Peter Budaj	15	728	5	5	2	32	2.64	386	.917	1	0	1	0

Playoffs

Player	GP	TOI	W	L	GA	GAA	SA	Sv%	SO	G	A	PIM
Craig Anderson	6	366	2	4	16	2.62	239	.933	1	0	1	0
Peter Budaj	1	9	0	0	1	6.67	4	.750	0	0	0	0

^{†}Denotes player spent time with another team before joining Avalanche. Stats reflect time with the Avalanche only.
^{‡}Traded mid-season

== Awards and records ==
=== Milestones ===
Regular Season
Player	Milestone	Reached
Matt Duchene	1st Career NHL Game; 1st Career NHL Assist; 1st Career NHL Point	October 1, 2009
Ryan O'Reilly	1st Career NHL Game; 1st Career NHL Assist; 1st Career NHL Point	October 1, 2009
John-Michael Liles	200th Career NHL Point	October 1, 2009
Matt Hendricks	1st Career NHL Goal; 1st Career NHL Point	October 10, 2009
Ryan O'Reilly	1st Career NHL Goal	October 15, 2009
Ryan Wilson	1st Career NHL Game	October 15, 2009
Paul Stastny	200th Career NHL Game	October 15, 2009
Matt Duchene	1st Career NHL Goal	October 17, 2009
Ryan Wilson	1st Career NHL Assist; 1st Career NHL Point	October 23, 2009
Kyle Quincey	100th Career NHL Game	November 1, 2009
Paul Stastny	200th Career NHL Point	November 4, 2009
Philippe Dupuis	1st Career NHL Assist; 1st Career NHL Point	November 4, 2009
Milan Hejduk	800th Career NHL Game	November 6, 2009
Ryan Wilson	1st Career NHL Goal	November 17, 2009
Chris Durno	1st Career NHL Assist; 1st Career NHL Point	November 18, 2009
Wojtek Wolski	100th Career NHL Assist	November 20, 2009
John-Michael Liles	400th Career NHL Game	November 23, 2009
Scott Hannan	700th Career NHL Game	December 2, 2009
Darcy Tucker	900th Career NHL Game	December 7, 2009
Justin Mercier	1st Career NHL Game	December 9, 2009
Ryan Stoa	1st Career NHL Game	December 13, 2009
Brandon Yip	1st Career NHL Game	December 19, 2009
Brandon Yip	1st Career NHL Goal; 1st Career NHL Point	December 22, 2009
Matt Hendricks	1st Career NHL Assist	December 22, 2009
Brett Clark	100th Career NHL Assist	December 26, 2009
Chris Durno	1st Career NHL Goal	December 26, 2009
Brandon Yip	1st Career NHL Assist	December 30, 2009
David Koci	100th Career NHL Game	January 18, 2010
Ryan Stoa	1st Career NHL Assist; 1st Career NHL Point	January 22, 2010
Chris Stewart	100th Career NHL Game	January 28, 2010
Brett Clark	500th Career NHL Game	January 29, 2010
Justin Mercier	1st Career NHL Assist; 1st Career NHL Point	January 31, 2010
Justin Mercier	1st Career NHL Goal	February 4, 2010
Marek Svatos	300th Career NHL Game	February 4, 2010
Wojtek Wolski	300th Career NHL Game	February 12, 2010
Chris Stewart	1st Career NHL Hat Trick	March 6, 2010
Kyle Cumiskey	100th Career NHL Game	March 14, 2010
Adam Foote	300th Career NHL Point	April 4, 2010
Milan Hejduk	700th Career NHL Point	April 4, 2010
Ryan Stoa	1st Career NHL Goal	April 9, 2010

Playoffs
Player	Milestone	Reached
Chris Stewart	1st Career NHL Playoff Game; 1st Career NHL Playoff Goal; 1st Career NHL Playoff Point	April 14, 2010
Matt Duchene	1st Career NHL Playoff Game; 1st Career NHL Playoff Assist; 1st Career NHL Playoff Point	April 14, 2010
TJ Galiardi	1st Career NHL Playoff Game; 1st Career NHL Playoff Assist; 1st Career NHL Playoff Point	April 14, 2010
Brandon Yip	1st Career NHL Playoff Game	April 14, 2010
Kyle Cumiskey	1st Career NHL Playoff Game	April 14, 2010
Ryan Wilson	1st Career NHL Playoff Game	April 14, 2010
Ryan O'Reilly	1st Career NHL Playoff Game	April 14, 2010
Matt Hendricks	1st Career NHL Playoff Game	April 14, 2010
Kevin Porter	1st Career NHL Playoff Game	April 14, 2010
Craig Anderson	1st Career NHL Playoff Game; 1st Career NHL Playoff Win	April 14, 2010
Brandon Yip	1st Career NHL Playoff Goal; 1st Career NHL Playoff Assist; 1st Career NHL Playoff Point	April 16, 2010
Kyle Cumiskey	1st Career NHL Playoff Goal; 1st Career NHL Playoff Point	April 16, 2010
Ryan Wilson	1st Career NHL Playoff Assist; 1st Career NHL Playoff Point	April 16, 2010
Ryan O'Reilly	1st Career NHL Playoff Goal; 1st Career NHL Playoff Point	April 18, 2010
Ryan Stoa	1st Career NHL Playoff Game	April 18, 2010
Craig Anderson	1st Career NHL Playoff Shutout	April 18, 2010
Chris Durno	1st Career NHL Playoff Game	April 20, 2010

=== Awards ===
Regular Season
Player	Award	Awarded
Craig Anderson	NHL Second Star of the Week	October 5, 2009
Craig Anderson	NHL Second Star of the Week	October 19, 2009
Craig Anderson	NHL First Star of the Month	October 2009
Matt Duchene	NHL Third Star of the Week	December 7, 2009
Matt Duchene	NHL Rookie of the Month	December 2009
Craig Anderson	NHL Second Star of the Week	January 25, 2010
Chris Stewart	NHL First Star of the Week	March 8, 2010

== Transactions ==
The Avalanche were involved in the following transactions during the 2009–10 season.

=== Trades ===
Date	Details
July 3, 2009	To Los Angeles Kings Ryan Smyth	To Colorado Avalanche Kyle Quincey; Tom Preissing; 5th-round draft pick in 2010
July 16, 2009	To New York Rangers Nigel Williams	To Colorado Avalanche Brian Fahey
March 3, 2010	To Phoenix Coyotes Wojtek Wolski	To Colorado Avalanche Peter Mueller; Kevin Porter
March 3, 2010	To Carolina Hurricanes Cedric Lalonde-McNicoll; 6th-round draft pick in 2010	To Colorado Avalanche Stephane Yelle; Harrison Reed

=== Free agents acquired ===
Player	Former team	Contract terms
Craig Anderson	Florida Panthers	2 years, $3.6 million
David Koci	Tampa Bay Lightning	1 year, $575,000
Darren Haydar	Grand Rapids Griffins	undisclosed
Brett Skinner	Chicago Wolves	undisclosed
Zach Cohen	Boston University	entry-level contract

=== Free agents lost ===
Player	New team	Contract terms
Ian Laperriere	Philadelphia Flyers	3 years, $3.5 million
Lawrence Nycholat	Vancouver Canucks	1 year, $500,000
Tyler Arnason	New York Rangers	2-way contract
Andrew Raycroft	Vancouver Canucks	1 year, $500,000
Ben Guite	Nashville Predators	1 year, $550,000
Michael Vernace	Atlanta Thrashers	undisclosed
Cody McCormick	Buffalo Sabres	1 year, $522,500

=== Lost via retirement ===
Player
Joe Sakic

=== Player signings ===
Player	Contract terms
Cameron Gaunce	undisclosed
Trevor Cann	undisclosed
Cody McLeod	3 years, $3.1 million
Peter Budaj	1 year, $1.25 million
David Jones	undisclosed
Chris Durno	undisclosed
Matt Hendricks	undisclosed
Brian Willsie	undisclosed
Tyler Weiman	undisclosed
Philippe Dupuis	undisclosed
Kyle Cumiskey	undisclosed
Justin Mercier	undisclosed
Matt Duchene	3 year entry-level contract
Brandon Yip	entry-level contract
Ryan O'Reilly	3 year entry-level contract
Milan Hejduk	1-year contract extension
Mike Carman	entry-level contract
Mark Olver	entry-level contract
Kevin Shattenkirk	entry-level contract
Colby Cohen	entry-level contract

== Draft picks ==
Colorado had 7 picks at the 2009 NHL entry draft in Montreal, Quebec.

Round	#	Player	Position	Nationality	College/Junior/Club team (League)
1	3	Matt Duchene	Center	Canada	Brampton Battalion (OHL)
2	33	Ryan O'Reilly	Center	Canada	Erie Otters (OHL)
2	49 (from Montreal via Calgary)	Stefan Elliott	Defense	Canada	Saskatoon Blades (WHL)
3	64	Tyson Barrie	Defense	Canada	Kelowna Rockets (WHL)
5	124	Kieran Millan	Goaltender	Canada	Boston University (Hockey East)
6	154	Brandon Maxwell	Goaltender	United States	U.S. National Team Development Program (USHL)
7	184	Gus Young	Defense	United States	Noble and Greenough School (USHS-MA)

== Farm teams ==
=== Lake Erie Monsters ===
The Avalanche's American Hockey League affiliate was the Lake Erie Monsters, based in Cleveland, Ohio.

=== Johnstown Chiefs ===
The Johnstown Chiefs of the ECHL were the Avalanche's second-tier affiliate.

== See also ==
- 2009–10 NHL season
