= 2009–10 Anaheim Ducks season =

"Hopes shattered as Ducks miss playoffs"

2009–10 Anaheim Ducks
- Division: 4th Pacific
- Conference: 11th Western
- 2009–10 record: 39–32–11
- Home record: 25–11–5
- Road record: 14–21–6
- Goals for: 238
- Goals against: 251

Team information
- General manager: Bob Murray
- Coach: Randy Carlyle
- Captain: Scott Niedermayer
- Alternate captains: Ryan Getzlaf; Saku Koivu
- Arena: Honda Center
- Average attendance: 15,168 (88.3%); Total: 621,903

Team leaders
- Goals: Bobby Ryan (35)
- Assists: Ryan Getzlaf (50)
- Points: Corey Perry (76)
- Penalty minutes: George Parros (136)
- Plus/minus: Saku Koivu (+14)
- Wins: Jonas Hiller (30)
- Goals against average: Jonas Hiller (2.73)

The 2009–10 Anaheim Ducks season was the team's 17th season of operation (16th season of play) in the National Hockey League (NHL). The Ducks first game of the season was held at home, on October 3, 2009, against the San Jose Sharks. The season began with high hopes, but ended with disappointment for its fans and players as the Ducks failed to make the Stanley Cup playoffs for the first time since 2003–04.

== Off-season ==
The Ducks made a major trade at the 2009 NHL entry draft on June 26, trading Chris Pronger and Ryan Dingle to the Philadelphia Flyers in exchange for Joffrey Lupul, Luca Sbisa, two first-round draft picks and a conditional third-round pick. The Ducks then traded the Flyers' first-round pick for a later first-round pick and a second-round pick. The trades were the first in a series of 16 trades made by the Ducks in the 2009–10 season. The club signed former Montreal Canadiens captain Saku Koivu as a free agent, while Francois Beauchemin and Rob Niedermayer departed the Ducks for other teams.

== Regular season ==
The Ducks started the season poorly, playing under .500 for the first month. The team's top goalie, Jean-Sebastien Giguere struggled, failing to win a game until November 23. The Ducks increasingly played Jonas Hiller and the club reached the .500 mark in January. The team was not able to catch up in the standings despite improved play in the second half. Nearing the NHL trade deadline, general manager Bob Murray traded Giguere to the Toronto Maple Leafs and made several trades at the deadline.

== Schedule and results ==
=== Preseason ===
2009 Preseason Game Log
September: 5–3–0 (Home: 3–1-0; Road: 2–2–0)

#	Date	Opponent	Score	OT	Win	Loss	Attendance	Record	Arena	Box
1	September 16	Coyotes	3–2	SO	Pielmeier (1–0–0)	LaBarbera (0–1–0)	13,869	1–0–0	Honda Center	W1
2	September 17	Canucks	3–0		Luongo (1–0–0)	Giguere (0–1–0)	14,528	1–1–0	Honda Center	L1
3	September 18	@ Coyotes	4–3	OT	Pielmeier (2–0–0)	Tordjman (0–1–0)	6,169*	2–1–0	Jobing.com Arena	W1
4	September 19	@ Kings	4–1		Bernier (2–0–0)	Hiller (0–1–0)	11,995	2–2–0	Staples Center	L1
5	September 21	Sharks	3–2		Giguere (1–1–0)	Nabokov (1–1–0)	14,300*	3–2–0	Honda Center	W1
6	September 24	@ Canucks	3–2	OT	Hiller (1–1–0)	Raycroft (2–1–0)	18,630	4–2–0	General Motors Place	W2
7	September 25	@ Sharks	6–0		Nabokov (2–2–0)	Pogge (0–1–0)	16,237	4–3–0	HP Pavilion at San Jose	L1
8	September 27	Kings	5–4		Giguere (2–1–0)	Ersberg (0–3–0)	15,677*	5–3–0	Honda Center	W1
*Attendance Figure provided by ESPN

Legend: Ducks Win Ducks loss

=== Regular season ===
2009–10 Game Log
October: 4–6–2 (Home: 2–5–0; Road: 2–1–2)

#	Date	Opponent	Score	OT	Win	Loss	Attendance	Record	Arena	Box	Points
1	October 3	Sharks	4–1		Nabokov (1–1–0)	Hiller (0–1–0)	17,281	0–1–0	Honda Center	L1	0
2	October 6	@ Wild	4–3	OT	Backstrom (1–1–0)	Giguere (0–0–1)	18,256	0–1–1	Xcel Energy Center	O1	1
3	October 8	@ Bruins	6–1		Hiller (1–1–0)	Thomas (1–2–0)	16,158	1–1–1	TD Garden	W1	3
4	October 10	@ Flyers	3–2	SO	Hiller (2–1–0)	Emery (3–1–1)	19,603	2–1–1	Wachovia Center	W2	5
5	October 11	@ Rangers	3–0		Valiquette (1–0–0)	Giguere (0–1–1)	18,200	2–2–1	Madison Square Garden	L1	5
6	October 14	Wild	3–2		Hiller (3–1–0)	Backstrom (1–3–0)	15,111	3–2–1	Honda Center	W1	7
7	October 17	Blues	5–0		Conklin (2–0–0)	Hiller (3–2–0)	14,902	3–3–1	Honda Center	L1	7
8	October 21	Stars	4–2		Turco (2–3–3)	Hiller (3–3–0)	14,503	3–4–1	Honda Center	L2	7
9	October 24	Blue Jackets	6–4		Mason (5–2–0)	Giguere (0–2–1)	14,468	3–5–1	Honda Center	L3	7
10	October 26	Maple Leafs	6–3		Gustavsson (1–2–0)	Hiller (3–4–0)	14,291	3–6–1	Honda Center	L4	7
11	October 30	Canucks	7–2		Hiller (4–4–0)	Raycroft (1–3–0)	14,756	4–6–1	Honda Center	W1	9
12	October 31	@ Coyotes	3–2	SO	Bryzgalov (8–3–1)	Hiller (4–4–1)	6,495	4–6–2	Jobing.com Arena	O1	10

November: 6–5–2 (Home: 6–2–1; Road: 0–3–1)

#	Date	Opponent	Score	OT	Win	Loss	Attendance	Record	Arena	Box	Points
13	November 3	Penguins	4–3		Fleury (10–2–0)	Hiller (4–5–1)	16,128	4–7–2	Honda Center	L1	10
14	November 5	Predators	4–0		Hiller (5–5–1)	Rinne (4–5–0)	14,298	5–7–2	Honda Center	W1	12
15	November 7	Coyotes	4–3		Hiller (6–5–1)	Bryzgalov (9–5–1)	15,269	6–7–2	Honda Center	W2	14
16	November 11	@ Devils	3–1		Brodeur (10–4–0)	Hiller (6–6–1)	14,123	6–8–2	Prudential Center	L1	14
17	November 13	@ Blue Jackets	3–2	SO	Garon (4–3–0)	Giguere (0–2–2)	15,577	6–8–3	Nationwide Arena	O1	15
18	November 14	@ Red Wings	7–4		Howard (4–3–1)	Hiller (6–7–1)	20,066	6–9–3	Joe Louis Arena	L1	15
19	November 16	@ Penguins	5–2		Fleury (11–6–1)	Giguere (0–3–2)	17,052	6–10–3	Mellon Arena	L2	15
20	November 19	Lightning	4–3	OT	Hiller (7–7–1)	Smith (3–3–4)	14,555	7–10–3	Honda Center	W1	17
21	November 21	Sharks	3–2		Nabokov (14–4–4)	Hiller (7–8–1)	15,066	7–11–3	Honda Center	L1	17
22	November 23	Flames	3–2	SO	Giguere (1–3–2)	Kiprusoff (12–5–3)	15,348	8–11–3	Honda Center	W1	19
23	November 25	Hurricanes	3–2		Giguere (2–3–2)	Legace (2–3–2)	14,766	9–11–3	Honda Center	W2	21
24	November 27	Blackhawks	3–0		Giguere (3–3–2)	Huet (13–5–1)	15,068	10–11–3	Honda Center	W3	23
25	November 29	Coyotes	3–2	OT	Bryzgalov (14–8–1)	Giguere (3–3–3)	13,023	10–11–4	Honda Center	O1	24

December: 6–5–3 (Home: 3–1–1; Road: 3–4–2)

#	Date	Opponent	Score	OT	Win	Loss	Attendance	Record	Arena	Box	Points
26	December 1	Kings	4–3		Quick (15–9–2)	Hiller (7–9–1)	14,231	10–12–4	Honda Center	L1	24
27	December 3	@ Stars	3–1		Turco (9–6–5)	Giguere (3–4–3)	16,217	10–13–4	American Airlines Center	L2	24
28	December 4	@ Wild	5–4	SO	Backstrom (11–9–3)	Hiller (7–9–2)	18,265	10–13–5	Xcel Energy Center	O1	25
29	December 6	Senators	4–3	SO	Elliott (6–5–3)	Giguere (3–4–4)	14,946	10–13–6	Honda Center	O2	26
30	December 8	Stars	4–3	OT	Giguere (4–4–4)	Turco (9–6–7)	13,861	11–13–6	Honda Center	W1	28
31	December 11	@ Red Wings	3–2	OT	Howard (9–7–1)	Giguere (4–4–5)	20,066	11–13–7	Joe Louis Arena	O1	29
32	December 12	@ Blue Jackets	3–1		Hiller (8–9–2)	Mason (10–10–5)	14,461	12–13–7	Nationwide Arena	W1	31
33	December 16	@ Canucks	3–2		Hiller (9–9–2)	Luongo (15–12–0)	18,810	13–13–7	General Motors Place	W2	33
34	December 17	@ Sharks	4–1		Nabokov (17–6–)	Giguere (4–5–5)	17,562	13–14–7	HP Pavilion at San Jose	L1	33
35	December 19	Coyotes	4–2		Hiller (10–9–2)	Bryzgalov (19–10–2)	15,107	14–14–7	Honda Center	W1	35
36	December 22	@ Avalanche	4–2		Hiller (11–9–2)	Anderson (18–9–6)	12,171	15–14–7	Pepsi Center	W2	37
37	December 23	@ Coyotes	4–0		Bryzgalov (21–10–2)	Hiller (11–10–2)	10,030	15–15–7	Jobing.com Arena	L1	37
38	December 26	@ Sharks	5–2		Nabokov (20–6–7)	Giguere (4–6–5)	17,562	15–16–7	HP Pavilion at San Jose	L2	37
39	December 29	Wild	4–2		Hiller (12–10–2)	Harding (2–6–0)	16,960	16–16–7	Honda Center	W1	39
40	December 31	@ Stars	5–3		Turco (13–8–8)	Hiller (12–11–2)	18,532	16–17–7	American Airlines Center	L1	39

January: 9–6–0 (Home: 5–0–0; Road: 4–6–0)

#	Date	Opponent	Score	OT	Win	Loss	Attendance	Record	Arena	Box	Points
41	January 2	@ Predators	3–1		Rinne (17–9–2)	Hiller (12–12–2)	16,654	16–18–7	Sommet Center	L2	39
42	January 3	@ Blackhawks	5–2		Niemi (10–2–1)	Giguere (4–7–5)	21,662	16–19–7	United Center	L3	39
43	January 5	Red Wings	4–1		Hiller (13–12–2)	Howard (14–9–2)	15,531	17–19–7	Honda Center	W1	41
44	January 7	Blues	4–2		Hiller (14–12–2)	Mason (11–13–6)	14,248	18–19–7	Honda Center	W2	43
45	January 9	@ Predators	3–2		Hiller (15–12–2)	Rinne (18–10–2)	17,113	19–19–7	Sommet Center	W3	45
46	January 10	@ Blackhawks	3–1		Hiller (16–12–2)	Niemi (11–3–1)	21,708	20–19–7	United Center	W4	47
47	January 13	Bruins	4–3		Hiller (17–12–2)	Rask (10–7–2)	14,957	21–19–7	Honda Center	W5	49
48	January 14	@ Kings	4–0		Quick (24–15–3)	Hiller (17–13–2)	18,118	21–20–7	Staples Center	L1	49
49	January 17	Flames	5–4		Hiller (18–13–2)	McElhinney (3–6–0)	16,153	22–20–7	Honda Center	W1	51
50	January 19	Sabres	5–4		Hiller (19–13–2)	Miller (28–9–4)	15,570	23–20–7	Honda Center	W2	53
51	January 21	@ Sharks	3–1		Nabokov (29–8–8)	Hiller (19–14–2)	17,562	23–21–7	HP Pavilion at San Jose	L1	53
52	January 23	@ Blues	4–3	SO	Hiller (20–14–2)	Mason (15–15–7)	19,150	24–21–7	Scottrade Center	W1	55
53	January 26	@ Thrashers	2–1		Hedberg (11–12–4)	Hiller (20–15–2)	12,984	24–22–7	Philips Arena	L1	55
54	January 27	@ Capitals	5–1		Neuvirth (9–5–0)	Giguere ‡ (4–8–5)	18,277	24–23–7	Verizon Center	L2	55
55	January 29	@ Lightning	2–1	SO	Hiller (21–15–2)	Niittymaki (12–11–5)	15,230	25–23–7	St. Pete Times Forum	W1	57

February: 5–2–0 (Home: 3–0–0; Road: 2–2–0)

#	Date	Opponent	Score	OT	Win	Loss	Attendance	Record	Arena	Box	Points
56	February 1	@ Panthers	3–0		Hiller (22–15–2)	Vokoun (19–18–9)	10,843	26–23–7	BankAtlantic Center	W2	59
57	February 3	Red Wings	3–1		Hiller (23–15–2)	Howard (20–13–6)	15,180	27–23–7	Honda Center	W3	61
58	February 4	@ Kings	6–4		Quick (33–16–3)	Hiller (23–16–2)	18,118	27–24–7	Staples Center	L1	61
59	February 8	Kings	4–2		Hiller (24–16–2)	Quick (34–17–3)	16,033	28–24–7	Honda Center	W1	63
60	February 10	Oilers	3–2		Hiller (25–16–2)	Deslauriers (11–20–3)	14,766	29–24–7	Honda Center	W2	65
61	February 13	@ Flames	3–1		Kiprusoff (27–19–9)	Hiller (25–17–2)	19,289	29–25–7	Pengrowth Saddledome	L1	65
62	February 14	@ Oilers	7–3		Hiller (26–17–2)	Deslauriers (12–21–3)	16,839	30–25–7	Rexall Place	W1	67
Feb. 16–28: 2010 Winter Olympics			Canada United States Finland						Canada Hockey Place	Vancouver, BC	

March: 7–6–1 (Home: 5–3–1; Road: 2–3–0)

#	Date	Opponent	Score	OT	Win	Loss	Attendance	Record	Arena	Box	Points
63	March 3	Avalanche	4–3		Anderson (32–17–5)	Hiller (26–18–2)	14,840	30–26–7	Honda Center	L1	67
64	March 6	@ Coyotes	4–0		Bryzgalov (34–18–4)	Hiller (26–19–2)	14,965	30–27–7	Jobing.com Arena	L2	67
65	March 7	Canadiens	4–3	SO	Halak (19–10–2)	Hiller (26–19–3)	15,883	30–27–8	Honda Center	O1	68
66	March 9	Blue Jackets	5–2		Garon (10–9–4)	Hiller (26–20–3)	13,700	30–28–8	Honda Center	L1	68
67	March 12	Predators	1–0		Rinne (23–13–4)	Hiller (26–21–3)	15,077	30–29–8	Honda Center	L2	68
68	March 14	Sharks	4–2		Hiller (27–21–3)	Nabokov (37–11–9)	16,317	31–29–8	Honda Center	W1	70
69	March 17	Blackhawks	4–2		Hiller (28–21–3)	Crawford (0–1–0)	15,243	32–29–8	Honda Center	W2	72
70	March 19	Islanders	5–4	OT	McElhinney † (1–0–0)	Biron (5–12–4)	14,665	33–29–8	Honda Center	W3	74
71	March 21	Avalanche	4–2		Hiller (29–21–3)	Anderson (35–21–5)	15,528	34–29–8	Honda Center	W4	76
72	March 23	@ Flames	3–1		Kiprusoff (32–23–9)	Hiller (29–22–3)	19,289	34–30–8	Pengrowth Saddledome	L1	76
73	March 24	@ Canucks	4–1		Raycroft (8–4–1)	Hiller (29–23–3)	18,810	34–31–8	General Motors Place	L2	76
74	March 26	@ Oilers	3–2		McElhinney (2–0–0)	Deslauriers (15–26–3)	16,839	35–31–8	Rexall Place	W1	78
75	March 29	Stars	3–1		McElhinney (3–0–0)	Lehtonen (4–3–0)	15,070	36–31–8	Honda Center	W2	80
76	March 31	@ Avalanche	5–2		McElhinney (4–0–0)	Anderson (36–24–6)	13,862	37–31–8	Pepsi Center	W3	82

April: 2–1–3 (Home: 1–0–2; Road: 1–1–1)

#	Date	Opponent	Score	OT	Win	Loss	Attendance	Record	Arena	Box	Points
77	April 2	Canucks	5–4	SO	Raycroft (9–4–1)	McElhinney (4–0–1)	16,534	37–31–9	Honda Center	O1	83
78	April 3	@ Kings	2–1	SO	McElhinney (5–0–1)	Quick (39–24–5)	18,118	38–31–9	Staples Center	W1	85
79	April 6	Kings	5–4	SO	Ersberg (3–3–2)	McElhinney (5–0–2)	16,278	38–31–10	Honda Center	O1	86
80	April 8	@ Stars	3–2	SO	Turco (22–20–11)	Hiller (29–23–4)	18,009	38–31–11	American Airlines Center	O2	87
81	April 9	@ Blues	6–3		Mason (30–22–8)	McElhinney (5–1–2)	19,150	38–32–11	Scottrade Center	L1	87
82	April 11	Oilers	7–2		Hiller (30–23–4)	Deslauriers (16–28–4)	16,392	39–32–11	Honda Center	W1	89

Legend:

Ducks Win (2 pts.) Ducks Loss (0 pts.) Winter Olympics OT Loss (1 pt.) Eliminated

"Points" Legend:

1st (Pacific Division) Not in Playoff Position In Playoff Position

== Standings ==
=== Divisional standings ===
Pacific Division
		GP	W	L	OTL	GF	GA	Pts
**1**	**z – San Jose Sharks**	**82**	**51**	**20**	**11**	**264**	**215**	**113**
**2**	**Phoenix Coyotes**	**82**	**50**	**25**	**7**	**225**	**202**	**107**
**3**	**Los Angeles Kings**	**82**	**46**	**27**	**9**	**241**	**219**	**101**
4	Anaheim Ducks	82	39	32	11	238	251	89
5	Dallas Stars	82	37	31	14	237	254	88

=== Conference standings ===
Western Conference
R		Div	GP	W	L	OTL	GF	GA	Pts
**1**	**z – San Jose Sharks**	**PA**	**82**	**51**	**20**	**11**	**264**	**215**	113
**2**	**y – Chicago Blackhawks**	**CE**	**82**	**52**	**22**	**8**	**271**	**209**	112
**3**	**y – Vancouver Canucks**	**NW**	**82**	**49**	**28**	**5**	**272**	**222**	103
**4**	**Phoenix Coyotes**	**PA**	**82**	**50**	**25**	**7**	**225**	**202**	107
**5**	**Detroit Red Wings**	**CE**	**82**	**44**	**24**	**14**	**229**	**216**	102
**6**	**Los Angeles Kings**	**PA**	**82**	**46**	**27**	**9**	**241**	**219**	101
**7**	**Nashville Predators**	**CE**	**82**	**47**	**29**	**6**	**225**	**225**	100
**8**	**Colorado Avalanche**	**NW**	**82**	**43**	**30**	**9**	**244**	**233**	95
8.5
9	Calgary Flames	NW	82	40	32	10	225	223	90
10	St. Louis Blues	CE	82	40	32	10	204	210	90
11	Anaheim Ducks	PA	82	39	32	11	238	251	89
12	Dallas Stars	PA	82	37	31	14	237	254	88
13	Minnesota Wild	NW	82	38	36	8	219	246	84
14	Columbus Blue Jackets	CE	82	32	35	15	216	259	79
15	Edmonton Oilers	NW	82	27	47	8	214	284	62

bold – Qualified for playoffs; y – Won division; z – Won conference (and division)

== Player statistics ==
=== Skaters ===
Note: GP = Games played; G = Goals; A = Assists; Pts = Points; +/− = Plus/minus; PIM = Penalty minutes

Regular season

Player	GP	G	A	Pts	+/−	PIM
Corey Perry	82	27	49	76	0	111
Ryan Getzlaf	66	19	50	69	4	79
Bobby Ryan	81	35	29	64	9	81
Saku Koivu	71	19	33	52	14	36
Teemu Selanne	54	27	21	48	3	16
Scott Niedermayer	80	10	38	48	-9	38
James Wisniewski	69	3	27	30	-5	56
Ryan Whitney^{‡}	62	4	24	28	-6	48
Todd Marchant	78	9	13	22	-16	32
Dan Sexton	41	9	10	19	-3	16
Matt Beleskey	60	11	7	18	-10	35
Steve Eminger	63	4	12	16	1	30
Jason Blake^{†}	26	6	9	15	-6	10
Joffrey Lupul	23	10	4	14	3	18
Lubomir Visnovsky^{†}	16	5	8	13	-6	4
Kyle Chipchura^{†}	55	6	6	12	-2	56
Petteri Nokelainen^{‡}	50	4	7	11	-7	21
Sheldon Brookbank	66	0	9	9	10	114
Ryan Carter	38	4	5	9	0	31
Evgeny Artyukhin^{‡}	37	4	5	9	0	41
Troy Bodie	44	5	2	7	-8	80
Mike Brown	75	6	1	7	1	106
Nick Boynton^{‡}	42	1	6	7	1	59
George Parros	57	4	0	4	4	136
Brett Festerling	42	0	3	3	1	15
Kyle Calder	14	0	2	2	-7	8
Brendan Mikkelson	28	0	2	2	-5	14
Nick Bonino	9	1	1	2	0	6
Aaron Ward^{†}	17	0	2	2	2	8
Nathan Oystrick	3	0	0	0	-1	2
Luca Sbisa	8	0	0	0	-1	6
MacGregor Sharp	8	0	0	0	0	0
Erik Christensen^{‡}	9	0	0	0	-3	2
Andrew Ebbett^{‡}	2	0	0	0	-1	0

=== Goaltenders ===
Note: GP = Games played; GS = Games started; TOI = Time on ice (minutes); W = Wins; L = Losses; OT = Overtime losses; GA = Goals against; GAA= Goals against average; SA= Shots against; SV= Saves; Sv% = Save percentage; SO= Shutouts

Regular season

Player	GP	GS	TOI	W	L	OT	GA	GAA	SA	Sv%	SO	G	A	PIM
Jonas Hiller	59	58	3338	30	23	4	152	2.73	1860	.918	2	0	2	0
Jean-Sebastien Giguere^{‡}	20	17	1108	4	8	5	58	3.14	580	.900	1	0	0	2
Curtis McElhinney^{†}	10	7	521	5	1	2	24	2.76	288	.917	0	0	0	0

^{†}Denotes player spent time with another team before joining Ducks. Stats reflect time with Ducks only.
^{‡}Traded mid-season.
Bold/italics denotes franchise record

== Awards and records ==
=== Awards ===
Regular Season
Player	Award	Awarded
Jonas Hiller	NHL Second Star of the Week	January 11, 2010
Teemu Selanne	NHL Third Star of the Week	March 22, 2010
Saku Koivu	NHL Second Star of the Week	April 5, 2010

=== Milestones ===
Regular Season
Player	Milestone	Reached
Ryan Getzlaf	300th NHL Game	October 8, 2009 (vs. Boston Bruins)
Corey Perry	200th NHL Point	October 10, 2009 (vs. Philadelphia Flyers)
Teemu Selanne	600th NHL Goal	March 21, 2010 (vs. Colorado Avalanche)
Teemu Selanne	602nd NHL Goal (Highest scoring Finnish player in NHL History)	March 31, 2010 (vs. Colorado Avalanche)

== Transactions ==
The Ducks have been involved in the following transactions during the 2009–10 season.

=== Trades ===
Date	Details
June 26, 2009	To Philadelphia Flyers Chris Pronger; Ryan Dingle	To Anaheim Ducks Joffrey Lupul; Luca Sbisa; 1st-round pick (21st overall) in 2009; 1st-round pick in 2010; Conditional 3rd-round pick in 2010 or 2011 (Note: Condition not satisfied.)
June 26, 2009	To Columbus Blue Jackets 1st-round pick (21st overall) in 2009	To Anaheim Ducks 1st-round pick (26th overall) in 2009; 2nd-round pick (37th overall) in 2009
August 10, 2009	To Toronto Maple Leafs Conditional 6th-round pick in 2011 (Note: Condition satisfied.)	To Anaheim Ducks Justin Pogge
August 13, 2009	To Tampa Bay Lightning Drew Miller; 3rd-round pick in 2010	To Anaheim Ducks Evgeny Artyukhin
September 4, 2009	To Ottawa Senators Jason Bailey	To Anaheim Ducks Shawn Weller
September 24, 2009	To Atlanta Thrashers Steve McCarthy	To Anaheim Ducks Future considerations
December 2, 2009	To Montreal Canadiens 4th-round pick in 2011	To Anaheim Ducks Kyle Chipchura
January 31, 2010	To Toronto Maple Leafs Jean-Sebastien Giguere	To Anaheim Ducks Jason Blake; Vesa Toskala
March 1, 2010	To Atlanta Thrashers Evgeny Artyukhin	To Anaheim Ducks Nathan Oystrick; Conditional pick in 2011 (Note: Condition not satisfied.)
March 2, 2010	To Boston Bruins Steven Kampfer	To Anaheim Ducks Conditional 4th-round pick in 2010 (Note: Condition satisfied.)
March 2, 2010	To Chicago Blackhawks Nick Boynton	To Anaheim Ducks Future considerations
March 3, 2010	To Carolina Hurricanes Justin Pogge; Conditional 4th-round pick in 2010 (Note: Condition satisfied.)	To Anaheim Ducks Aaron Ward
March 3, 2010	To Calgary Flames Vesa Toskala	To Anaheim Ducks Curtis McElhinney
March 3, 2010	To Toronto Maple Leafs 7th-round pick in 2011	To Anaheim Ducks Joey MacDonald
March 3, 2010	To Edmonton Oilers Ryan Whitney; 6th-round pick in 2010	To Anaheim Ducks Lubomir Visnovsky
March 3, 2010	To Phoenix Coyotes Petteri Nokelainen	To Anaheim Ducks 6th-round pick in 2011

=== Free agents acquired ===
Player	Former team	Contract terms
Dan Sexton	Bowling Green State University	2 year, $1.5 million, entry-level contract
Saku Koivu	Montreal Canadiens	1 year, $3.25 million
Nick Boynton	Florida Panthers	1 year, $1.5 million
Steve McCarthy	Ufa Salavat Yulayev	1 year
Steve Eminger	Florida Panthers	2 years
Jake Newton	Northeastern University	3 year entry-level contract
Rob Bordson	University of Minnesota Duluth	2 year entry-level contract

=== Free agents lost ===
Player	New team	Contract terms
Francois Beauchemin	Toronto Maple Leafs	3 years, $11.4 million
Rob Niedermayer	New Jersey Devils	1 year, $1 million

=== Claimed via waivers ===
Player	Former team	Date claimed off waivers

=== Lost via waivers ===
Player	New team	Date claimed off waivers
Andrew Ebbett	Chicago Blackhawks	October 17, 2009
Erik Christensen	New York Rangers	December 2, 2009

=== Lost via retirement ===
Player
Bret Hedican

=== Player signings ===
Player	Contract terms
Mike Brown	2 years
Troy Bodie	2 years
Erik Christensen	1 year, $750,000
Scott Niedermayer	1 year, $6 million
Brian Salcido	1 year
Todd Marchant	2 years, $2.25 million
James Wisniewski	1 year, $2.75 million
Nicolas Deschamps	3-year entry-level contract
Petteri Nokelainen	1-year contract extension
Brett Festerling	2 years
Jonas Hiller	4 years, $18 million contract extension
Nick Bonino	2 year entry-level contract
Mat Clark	3 year entry-level contract
Peter Holland	3 year entry-level contract

== Draft picks ==
The Ducks picks at the 2009 NHL entry draft in Montreal.

Round	#	Player	Position	Nationality	College/Junior/Club team (League)
1	15	Peter Holland	(C)	Canada	Guelph Storm (OHL)
1	26 (from San Jose via Tampa Bay, Ottawa, New York Islanders and Columbus)	Kyle Palmieri	(C/RW)	United States	U.S. National Team Development Program (USHL)
2	37 (from Toronto via NY Islanders and Columbus)	Mat Clark	(D)	Canada	Brampton Battalion (OHL)
3	76	Igor Bobkov	(G)	Russia	Metallurg Magnitogorsk (KHL)
4	106	Sami Vatanen	(D)	Finland	JYP (SM-liiga)
5	136	Radoslav Illo	(F)	Slovakia	Tri-City Storm (USHL)
6	166	Scott Valentine	(D)	Canada	Oshawa Generals (OHL)

== See also ==
- Anaheim Ducks
- Honda Center
- 2009–10 NHL season

=== Other Anaheim–based teams in 2009–10 ===
- Los Angeles Angels of Anaheim (Angel Stadium of Anaheim)
  - 2009 Los Angeles Angels of Anaheim season
  - 2010 Los Angeles Angels of Anaheim season
