= 2009–10 San Jose Sharks season =

National Hockey League team season

2009–10 San Jose Sharks
- Pacific Division champions
- Division: 1st Pacific
- Conference: 1st Western
- 2009–10 record: 51–20–11
- Home record: 27–6–8
- Road record: 24–14–3
- Goals for: 264
- Goals against: 215

Team information
- General manager: Doug Wilson
- Coach: Todd McLellan
- Captain: Rob Blake
- Alternate captains: Dan Boyle; Joe Thornton
- Arena: HP Pavilion at San Jose

The 2009–10 San Jose Sharks season was the team's 19th season of operation in the National Hockey League (NHL).

== Off-season ==
At the 2010 NHL entry draft, the Sharks picked William Wrenn in the second round with their first choice. The Sharks had traded their first-round pick to the Tampa Bay Lightning as part of the trade to acquire defenseman Dan Boyle.

Forward Patrick Marleau was replaced as team captain by defenseman Rob Blake.

== Pre-season ==
2009 Pre-season Game Log: 3–3–1 (Home: 2–1–0; Road: 1–2–1)
#	Date	Visitor	Score	Home	OT	Decision	Record	Recap
1	September 17 (in Ontario, CA)	San Jose Sharks	2-1	Los Angeles Kings	SO	Greiss	1-0-0
2	September 18	Vancouver Canucks	6-2	San Jose Sharks		Greiss	1-1-0
3	September 19	Phoenix Coyotes	4-5	San Jose Sharks	OT	Nabokov	2-1-0
4	September 21	San Jose Sharks	2-3	Anaheim Ducks		Nabokov	2-2-0
5	September 23	San Jose Sharks	3-4	Vancouver Canucks	SO	Nabokov	2-2-1
6	September 25	Anaheim Ducks	0-6	San Jose Sharks		Nabokov	3-2-1
7	September 26	San Jose Sharks	0-2	Phoenix Coyotes		Greiss	3-3-1

== Standings ==
=== Divisional standings ===
Pacific Division
		GP	W	L	OTL	GF	GA	Pts
**1**	**z – San Jose Sharks**	**82**	**51**	**20**	**11**	**264**	**215**	**113**
**2**	**Phoenix Coyotes**	**82**	**50**	**25**	**7**	**225**	**202**	**107**
**3**	**Los Angeles Kings**	**82**	**46**	**27**	**9**	**241**	**219**	**101**
4	Anaheim Ducks	82	39	32	11	238	251	89
5	Dallas Stars	82	37	31	14	237	254	88

=== Conference standings ===
Western Conference
R		Div	GP	W	L	OTL	GF	GA	Pts
**1**	**z – San Jose Sharks**	**PA**	**82**	**51**	**20**	**11**	**264**	**215**	113
**2**	**y – Chicago Blackhawks**	**CE**	**82**	**52**	**22**	**8**	**271**	**209**	112
**3**	**y – Vancouver Canucks**	**NW**	**82**	**49**	**28**	**5**	**272**	**222**	103
**4**	**Phoenix Coyotes**	**PA**	**82**	**50**	**25**	**7**	**225**	**202**	107
**5**	**Detroit Red Wings**	**CE**	**82**	**44**	**24**	**14**	**229**	**216**	102
**6**	**Los Angeles Kings**	**PA**	**82**	**46**	**27**	**9**	**241**	**219**	101
**7**	**Nashville Predators**	**CE**	**82**	**47**	**29**	**6**	**225**	**225**	100
**8**	**Colorado Avalanche**	**NW**	**82**	**43**	**30**	**9**	**244**	**233**	95
8.5
9	Calgary Flames	NW	82	40	32	10	225	223	90
10	St. Louis Blues	CE	82	40	32	10	204	210	90
11	Anaheim Ducks	PA	82	39	32	11	238	251	89
12	Dallas Stars	PA	82	37	31	14	237	254	88
13	Minnesota Wild	NW	82	38	36	8	219	246	84
14	Columbus Blue Jackets	CE	82	32	35	15	216	259	79
15	Edmonton Oilers	NW	82	27	47	8	214	284	62

bold – Qualified for playoffs; y – Won division; z – Won conference (and division)

== Schedule and results ==
- Green background indicates win (2 points).
- Red background indicates regulation loss (0 points).
- White background indicates overtime/shootout loss (1 point).

2009–10 Game Log

October: 9–4–1 (Home: 4–0–1; Road: 5–4–0)
#	Date	Visitor	Score	Home	OT	Decision	Attendance	Record	Pts	Recap
1	October 1	San Jose Sharks	2-5	Colorado Avalanche		Nabokov	18,007	0-1-0	0
2	October 3	San Jose Sharks	4-1	Anaheim Ducks		Nabokov	17,281	1-1-0	2
3	October 6	San Jose Sharks	4-6	Los Angeles Kings		Nabokov	15,053	1-2-0	2
4	October 8	Columbus Blue Jackets	3-6	San Jose Sharks		Nabokov	17,562	2-2-0	4
5	October 10	Minnesota Wild	2-4	San Jose Sharks		Nabokov	17,562	3-2-0	6
6	October 12	Phoenix Coyotes	1-0	San Jose Sharks	SO	Nabokov	17,562	3-2-1	7
7	October 15	San Jose Sharks	1-4	Washington Capitals		Nabokov	18,277	3-3-1	7
8	October 17	San Jose Sharks	4-1	New York Islanders		Nabokov	11,287	4-3-1	9
9	October 19	San Jose Sharks	7-3	New York Rangers		Nabokov	18,200	5-3-1	11
10	October 22	San Jose Sharks	2-5	Tampa Bay Lightning		Nabokov	13,343	5-4-1	11
11	October 24	San Jose Sharks	4-3	Atlanta Thrashers		Nabokov	14,945	6-4-1	13
12	October 25	San Jose Sharks	4-1	Philadelphia Flyers		Greiss	19,126	7-4-1	15
13	October 28	Los Angeles Kings	1-2	San Jose Sharks	SO	Nabokov	17,562	8-4-1	17
14	October 30	Colorado Avalanche	1-3	San Jose Sharks		Nabokov	17,562	9-4-1	19

November: 9–2–3 (Home: 3–1–1; Road: 6–1–2)
#	Date	Visitor	Score	Home	OT	Decision	Attendance	Record	Pts	Recap
15	November 1	San Jose Sharks	5-1	Carolina Hurricanes		Nabokov	15,089	10-4-1	21
16	November 4	San Jose Sharks	3-2	Columbus Blue Jackets	SO	Nabokov	13,401	11-4-1	23
17	November 5	San Jose Sharks	1-2	Detroit Red Wings	SO	Nabokov	19,558	11-4-2	24
18	November 7	Pittsburgh Penguins	0-5	San Jose Sharks		Nabokov	17,562	12-4-2	26
19	November 10	Nashville Predators	3-4	San Jose Sharks		Greiss	17,562	13-4-2	28
20	November 12	Dallas Stars	3-2	San Jose Sharks	SO	Nabokov	17,562	13-4-3	29
21	November 14	San Jose Sharks	3-1	St. Louis Blues		Nabokov	19,150	14-4-3	31
22	November 15	San Jose Sharks	3-4	Chicago Blackhawks	OT	Nabokov	21,130	14-4-4	32
23	November 17	San Jose Sharks	3-4	Nashville Predators		Greiss	13,324	14-5-4	32
24	November 20	Philadelphia Flyers	3-6	San Jose Sharks		Nabokov	17,562	15-5-4	34
25	November 21	San Jose Sharks	3-2	Anaheim Ducks		Nabokov	15,066	16-5-4	36
26	November 25	Chicago Blackhawks	7-2	San Jose Sharks		Nabokov	17,562	16-6-4	36
27	November 27	San Jose Sharks	5-4	Edmonton Oilers	SO	Nabokov	16,839	17-6-4	38
28	November 29	San Jose Sharks	4-2	Vancouver Canucks		Nabokov	18,810	18-6-4	40

December: 8–2–3 (Home: 5–1–3; Road: 3–1–0)
#	Date	Visitor	Score	Home	OT	Decision	Attendance	Record	Pts	Recap
29	December 1	Ottawa Senators	2-5	San Jose Sharks		Greiss	17,562	19-6-4	42
30	December 3	St. Louis Blues	3-2	San Jose Sharks	SO	Nabokov	17,424	19-6-5	43
31	December 5	Calgary Flames	2-1	San Jose Sharks		Nabokov	17,562	19-7-5	43
32	December 9	Los Angeles Kings	5-4	San Jose Sharks	OT	Nabokov	17,562	19-7-6	44
33	December 11	Dallas Stars	3-2	San Jose Sharks	SO	Nabokov	17,562	19-7-7	45
34	December 12	San Jose Sharks	1-2	Phoenix Coyotes		Greiss	10,650	19-8-7	45
35	December 17	Anaheim Ducks	1-4	San Jose Sharks		Nabokov	17,562	20-8-7	47
36	December 21	San Jose Sharks	4-2	Dallas Stars		Nabokov	18,532	21-8-7	49
37	December 22	San Jose Sharks	3-2	Chicago Blackhawks		Nabokov	21,614	22-8-7	51
38	December 26	Anaheim Ducks	2-5	San Jose Sharks		Nabokov	17,562	23-8-7	53
39	December 28	Phoenix Coyotes	2-3	San Jose Sharks	SO	Nabokov	17,562	24-8-7	55
40	December 30	Washington Capitals	2-5	San Jose Sharks		Nabokov	17,562	25-8-7	57
41	December 31	San Jose Sharks	3-2	Phoenix Coyotes	SO	Greiss	12,472	26-8-7	59

January: 10–2–2 (Home: 7–2–2; Road: 3–0–0)
#	Date	Visitor	Score	Home	OT	Decision	Attendance	Record	Pts	Recap
42	January 2	Edmonton Oilers	1-4	San Jose Sharks		Nabokov	17,562	27-8-7	61
43	January 4	Los Angeles Kings	6-2	San Jose Sharks		Nabokov	17,562	27-9-7	61
44	January 6	St. Louis Blues	1-2	San Jose Sharks	OT	Nabokov	17,562	28-9-7	63
45	January 9	Detroit Red Wings	4-1	San Jose Sharks		Nabokov	17,562	28-10-7	63
46	January 11	San Jose Sharks	2-1	Los Angeles Kings		Nabokov	17,821	29-10-7	65
47	January 12	San Jose Sharks	3-1	Phoenix Coyotes		Nabokov	9,248	30-10-7	67
48	January 14	Boston Bruins	2-1	San Jose Sharks	SO	Nabokov	17,562	30-10-8	68
49	January 16	Edmonton Oilers	2-4	San Jose Sharks		Greiss	17,562	31-10-8	70
50	January 18	Calgary Flames	1-9	San Jose Sharks		Nabokov	17,562	32-10-8	72
51	January 19	San Jose Sharks	5-1	Los Angeles Kings		Nabokov	16,212	33-10-8	74
52	January 21	Anaheim Ducks	1-3	San Jose Sharks		Nabokov	17,562	34-10-8	76
53	January 23	Buffalo Sabres	2-5	San Jose Sharks		Nabokov	17,562	35-10-8	78
54	January 28	Chicago Blackhawks	4-3	San Jose Sharks	OT	Nabokov	17,562	35-10-9	79
55	January 30	Minnesota Wild	2-5	San Jose Sharks		Nabokov	17,562	36-10-9	81

February: 4–3–0 (Home: 0–1–0; Road: 4–2–0)
#	Date	Visitor	Score	Home	OT	Decision	Attendance	Record	Pts	Recap
56	February 2	Detroit Red Wings	4-2	San Jose Sharks		Nabokov	17,562	36-11-9	81
57	February 4	San Jose Sharks	4-2	St. Louis Blues		Greiss	19,150	37-11-9	83
58	February 6	San Jose Sharks	4-3	Nashville Predators		Nabokov	16,007	38-11-9	85
59	February 8	San Jose Sharks	3-2	Toronto Maple Leafs		Nabokov	19,460	39-11-9	87
60	February 10	San Jose Sharks	0-3	Columbus Blue Jackets		Greiss	15,234	39-12-9	87
61	February 11	San Jose Sharks	3-2	Detroit Red Wings	SO	Nabokov	20,066	40-12-9	89
62	February 13	San Jose Sharks	1-3	Buffalo Sabres		Nabokov	18,690	40-13-9	89

March: 7–7–1 (Home: 6–1–1; Road: 1–6–0)
#	Date	Visitor	Score	Home	OT	Decision	Attendance	Record	Pts	Recap
63	March 2	New Jersey Devils	4-3	San Jose Sharks		Nabokov	17,562	40-14-9	89
64	March 4	Montreal Canadiens	2-3	San Jose Sharks		Nabokov	17,562	41-14-9	91
65	March 6	Columbus Blue Jackets	1-2	San Jose Sharks		Nabokov	17,562	42-14-9	93
66	March 11	Nashville Predators	5-8	San Jose Sharks		Nabokov	17,562	43-14-9	95
67	March 13	Florida Panthers	3-2	San Jose Sharks	OT	Greiss	17,562	43-14-10	96
68	March 14	San Jose Sharks	2-4	Anaheim Ducks		Nabokov	16,317	43-15-10	96
69	March 16	San Jose Sharks	2-8	Dallas Stars		Nabokov	18,532	43-16-10	96
70	March 18	San Jose Sharks	2-3	Vancouver Canucks		Nabokov	18,810	43-17-10	96
71	March 19	San Jose Sharks	3-4	Calgary Flames		Nabokov	19,289	43-18-10	96
72	March 21	San Jose Sharks	1-5	Edmonton Oilers		Nabokov	16,839	43-19-10	96
73	March 23	San Jose Sharks	4-1	Minnesota Wild		Nabokov	18,551	44-19-10	98
74	March 25	Dallas Stars	0-3	San Jose Sharks		Nabokov	17,562	45-19-10	100
75	March 27	Vancouver Canucks	2-4	San Jose Sharks		Nabokov	17,562	46-19-10	102
76	March 28	Colorado Avalanche	3-4	San Jose Sharks		Greiss	17,562	47-19-10	104
77	March 31	San Jose Sharks	1-5	Dallas Stars		Nabokov	17,263	47-20-10	104

April: 4–0–1 (Home: 2–0–0; Road: 2–0–1)
#	Date	Visitor	Score	Home	OT	Decision	Attendance	Record	Pts	Recap
78	April 2	San Jose Sharks	3-2	Minnesota Wild		Nabokov	18,584	48-20-10	106
79	April 4	San Jose Sharks	4-5	Colorado Avalanche	OT	Nabokov	12,893	48-20-11	107
80	April 6	San Jose Sharks	2-1	Calgary Flames		Nabokov	19,289	49-20-11	109
81	April 8	Vancouver Canucks	2-4	San Jose Sharks		Nabokov	17,562	50-20-11	111
82	April 10	Phoenix Coyotes	2-3	San Jose Sharks	SO	Nabokov	17,562	51-20-11	113

== Playoffs ==
2010 Stanley Cup Playoffs

Western Conference Quarter-finals: vs. (8) Colorado Avalanche
#	Date	Visitor	Score	Home	OT	Decision	Attendance	Series	Recap
1	April 14	Colorado	2–1	San Jose		Nabokov	17,562	0–1
2	April 16	Colorado	5–6	San Jose	OT	Nabokov	17,562	1–1
3	April 18	San Jose	0–1	Colorado	OT	Nabokov	18,007	1–2
4	April 20	San Jose	2–1	Colorado	OT	Nabokov	18,007	2–2
5	April 22	Colorado	0–5	San Jose		Nabokov	17,562	3–2
6	April 24	San Jose	5–2	Colorado		Nabokov	18,007	4–2

Western Conference Semi-finals: vs. (5) Detroit Red Wings
#	Date	Visitor	Score	Home	OT	Decision	Attendance	Series	Recap
1	April 29	Detroit	3–4	San Jose		Nabokov	17,562	1–0
2	May 2	Detroit	3–4	San Jose		Nabokov	17,562	2–0
3	May 4	San Jose	4–3	Detroit	OT	Nabokov	20,066	3–0
4	May 6	San Jose	1–7	Detroit		Nabokov	20,066	3–1
5	May 8	Detroit	1–2	San Jose		Nabokov	17,562	4–1

Western Conference Finals: vs. (2) Chicago Blackhawks
#	Date	Visitor	Score	Home	OT	Decision	Attendance	Series	Recap
1	May 16	Chicago	2–1	San Jose		Nabokov	17,562	0–1
2	May 18	Chicago	4–2	San Jose		Nabokov	17,562	0–2
3	May 21	San Jose	2–3	Chicago	OT	Nabokov	22,311	0–3
4	May 23	San Jose	2–4	Chicago		Nabokov	22,224	0–4

Legend: Win Loss

== Player statistics ==
=== Skaters ===
Note: GP = Games played; G = Goals; A = Assists; Pts = Points; +/− = Plus/minus; PIM = Penalty minutes

Updated September 18, 2010.

Regular season

Player	GP	G	A	Pts	+/−	PIM
Joe Thornton	79	20	69	89	17	54
Patrick Marleau	82	44	39	83	21	22
Dany Heatley	82	39	43	82	14	54
Dan Boyle	76	15	43	58	6	70
Ryane Clowe	82	19	38	57	0	131
Joe Pavelski	67	25	26	51	1	26
Devin Setoguchi	70	20	16	36	0	19
Manny Malhotra	71	14	19	33	17	41
Rob Blake	70	7	23	30	14	60
Kent Huskins	82	3	19	22	6	47
Jason Demers	51	4	17	21	5	21
Scott Nichol	79	4	15	19	0	72
Jed Ortmeyer	76	8	11	19	4	37
Douglas Murray	79	4	13	17	3	66
Marc-Edouard Vlasic	64	3	13	16	21	33
Jamie McGinn	59	10	3	13	-3	38
Torrey Mitchell	56	2	9	11	6	27
Logan Couture	25	5	4	9	4	6
Frazer McLaren	23	1	5	6	6	54
Brad Staubitz	47	3	3	6	0	110
Ryan Vesce	9	3	2	5	-1	0
Benn Ferriero	24	2	3	5	4	8
Derek Joslin	24	0	3	3	1	12
Jody Shelley^{‡}	36	0	3	3	1	78
Niclas Wallin^{†}	23	0	2	2	0	23
Jay Leach^{†}	28	1	1	2	3	20
Joe Callahan	1	0	1	1	1	0
Dwight Helminen	4	1	0	1	-1	0
Steven Zalewski	3	0	0	0	-2	0
John McCarthy	4	0	0	0	-3	0

Playoffs

Player	GP	G	A	Pts	+/−	PIM
Joe Pavelski	15	9	8	17	6	6
Dan Boyle	15	2	12	14	-1	8
Patrick Marleau	14	8	5	13	-3	8
Dany Heatley	14	2	11	13	-7	16
Joe Thornton	15	3	9	12	-11	18
Ryane Clowe	15	2	8	10	4	28
Devin Setoguchi	15	5	4	9	3	6
Douglas Murray	15	1	6	7	-1	8
Jason Demers	15	1	4	5	0	8
Logan Couture	15	4	0	4	1	4
Marc-Edouard Vlasic	15	0	3	3	0	4
Rob Blake	15	1	1	2	0	10
Scott Nichol	15	1	1	2	-1	17
Torrey Mitchell	15	0	2	2	-5	2
Manny Malhotra	15	1	0	1	-1	0
Dwight Helminen	7	1	0	1	0	4
Jed Ortmeyer	4	0	1	1	-1	0
Kent Huskins	15	0	0	0	-5	6
Niclas Wallin	6	0	0	0	-3	2
Jamie McGinn	15	0	0	0	1	8

=== Goaltenders ===
Note: GP = Games played; TOI = Time on ice (minutes); W = Wins; L = Losses; OT = Overtime losses; GA = Goals against; GAA= Goals against average; SA= Shots against; SV= Saves; Sv% = Save percentage; SO= Shutouts

Regular season

Player	GP	Min	W	L	OT	GA	GAA	SA	Sv%	SO	G	A	PIM
Evgeni Nabokov	71	4194	44	16	10	170	2.43	2168	.922	3	0	0	6
Thomas Greiss	16	782	7	4	1	35	2.69	399	.912	0	0	0	2

Playoffs

Player	GP	Min	W	L	GA	GAA	SA	Sv%	SO	G	A	PIM
Evgeni Nabokov	15	890	8	7	38	2.56	407	.907	1	0	0	0
Thomas Greiss	1	40	0	0	2	3.00	28	.929	0	0	0	0

^{†}Denotes player spent time with another team before joining Sharks. Stats reflect time with the Sharks only.
^{‡}Traded mid-season
Bold/italics denotes franchise record

== Awards and records ==
=== Awards ===
Regular Season
Player	Award	Awarded
Dany Heatley	NHL First Star of the Week	October 12, 2009
Patrick Marleau	NHL Third Star of the Week	October 26, 2009
Evgeni Nabokov	NHL Third Star of the Week	November 2, 2009
Evgeni Nabokov	NHL Second Star of the Week	November 9, 2009
Joe Thornton	NHL First Star of the Week	November 23, 2009
Joe Thornton	NHL Second Star of the Month	November 2009

== Transactions ==
The Sharks have been involved in the following transactions during the 2009–10 season.

=== Trades ===
Date	Details
June 27, 2009	To Dallas Stars 6th-round pick in 2010	To San Jose Sharks 7th-round pick (189th overall) in 2009
August 28, 2009	To Vancouver Canucks Christian Ehrhoff; Brad Lukowich	To San Jose Sharks Patrick White; Daniel Rahimi
September 12, 2009	To Ottawa Senators Jonathan Cheechoo; Milan Michalek; 2nd-round pick in 2010	To San Jose Sharks Dany Heatley; 5th-round pick in 2010
February 7, 2010	To Carolina Hurricanes 2nd-round pick in 2010	To San Jose Sharks Niclas Wallin; 5th-round pick in 2010
February 12, 2010	To New York Rangers Jody Shelley	To San Jose Sharks Conditional 6th-round pick in 2011 (Note: Condition satisfied.)

=== Free agents acquired ===
Player	Former team	Contract terms
Scott Nichol	Nashville Predators	1 year, $750,000
Joe Callahan	New York Islanders	1 year
Danny Groulx	Rockford IceHogs	1 year
Dwight Helminen	Carolina Hurricanes	1 year
Jed Ortmeyer	Nashville Predators	1 year
Henrik Karlsson	Malmo Redhawks	1 year
Benn Ferriero	Boston College	2 years
Manny Malhotra	Columbus Blue Jackets	1 year, $700,000
Thomas Heemskerk	Everett Silvertips	entry-level contract
Nick Schaus	University of Massachusetts Lowell	entry-level contract
Matt Irwin	University of Massachusetts Amherst	entry-level contract
James Marcou	University of Massachusetts Amherst	entry-level contract
Cam MacIntyre	Princeton University	entry-level contract

=== Free agents lost ===
Player	New team	Contract terms
Brian Boucher	Philadelphia Flyers	2 years, $1.85 million
Travis Moen	Montreal Canadiens	3 years, $4.5 million
Lukas Kaspar	Philadelphia Flyers	1 year
Riley Armstrong	Calgary Flames	undisclosed
Mike Grier	Buffalo Sabres	1 year
Marcel Goc	Nashville Predators	1 year, $550,000 2-way contract
Alexei Semenov	Dynamo Moscow	2 years, $1.5 million

=== Claimed via waivers ===
Player	Former team	Date claimed off waivers
Jay Leach	Montreal Canadiens	December 1, 2009

=== Lost via waivers ===
Player	New team	Date claimed off waivers

=== Lost via retirement ===
Player
Claude Lemieux
Jeremy Roenick

=== Players re-signed ===
Player	Contract terms
Rob Blake	1 year, $3.5 million
Kent Huskins	2 years, $3.4 million
Ryane Clowe	4 years, $14 million
Ryan Vesce	1 year
Thomas Greiss	2 years
Torrey Mitchell	3 years, $4.1 million
Brad Staubitz	1 year, $500,000
Tony Lucia	entry-level contract
Justin Braun	entry-level contract

=== Draft picks ===
San Jose's picks at the 2009 NHL entry draft in Montreal.

Round	#	Player	Position	Nationality	College/Junior/Club team (League)
2	43 (from Buffalo)	William Wrenn	(D)	United States	U.S. National Team Development Program (USHL)
2	57	Taylor Doherty	(D)	Canada	Kingston Frontenacs (OHL)
5	147	Phil Varone	(C)	Canada	London Knights (OHL)
7	189 (from Dallas)	Marek Viedensky	(C)	Slovakia	Prince George Cougars (WHL)
7	207	Dominik Bielke	(D)	Germany	Eisbaren Berlin (DEL)

== Farm teams ==
The Sharks' affiliate in the American Hockey League is the Worcester Sharks.
