= Scott Valentine =

Scott Valentine may refer to:

- Scott Valentine (actor) (born 1958), American actor
- Scott Valentine (ice hockey) (born 1991), Canadian ice hockey defenceman
