= 2009–10 Minnesota Wild season =

National Hockey League team season

2009–10 Minnesota Wild
- Division: 4th Northwest
- Conference: 13th Western
- 2009–10 record: 38–36–8
- Home record: 25–12–4
- Road record: 13–24–4

Team information
- General manager: Chuck Fletcher
- Coach: Todd Richards
- Captain: Mikko Koivu
- Alternate captains: Andrew Brunette; Martin Havlat; Kim Johnsson (Oct.–Feb.); Owen Nolan; Nick Schultz; Greg Zanon
- Arena: Xcel Energy Center
- Average attendance: 18,415 (101.9%)

The 2009–10 Minnesota Wild season was the team's tenth season in the National Hockey League (NHL). On May 22, Chuck Fletcher was named as the new general manager of the Wild, replacing Doug Risebrough. On June 16, the Wild named Todd Richards as the new head coach, replacing Jacques Lemaire, who had resigned from the position in April. On August 30, the Wild unveiled their new third jersey, which they debuted on October 21 against the Colorado Avalanche. The team ended its de facto policy of rotating the captaincy monthly by naming Mikko Koivu the team's permanent captain.

== Preseason ==
2009 Pre-season Game Log: 3–4–0 (Home: 2–1–0; Road: 1–3–0)
#	Date	Visitor	Score	Home	OT	Decision	Record	Recap
1	September 15	Minnesota Wild	1 - 3	St. Louis Blues		Khudobin	0-1-0
2	September 18	Columbus Blue Jackets	0 - 2	Minnesota Wild		Backstrom	1-1-0
3	September 20	Chicago Blackhawks	0 - 3	Minnesota Wild		Khudobin	2-1-0
4	September 21	Minnesota Wild	1 - 5	Columbus Blue Jackets		Harding	2-2-0
5	September 24	St. Louis Blues	4 - 1	Minnesota Wild		Backstrom	2-3-0
6	September 25	Minnesota Wild	3 - 4	Chicago Blackhawks		Harding	2-4-0
7	September 29	Minnesota Wild	5 - 4	Philadelphia Flyers	SO	Backstrom	3-4-0

== Regular season ==
The Wild allowed the most shorthanded goals in the League, with 13.

The Wild did not qualify for the 2010 Stanley Cup Playoffs, making it the second year in a row that they've missed the playoffs.

=== Divisional standings ===
Northwest Division
		GP	W	L	OTL	GF	GA	Pts
**1**	**y – Vancouver Canucks**	**82**	**49**	**28**	**5**	**272**	**222**	**103**
**2**	**Colorado Avalanche**	**82**	**43**	**30**	**9**	**244**	**233**	**95**
3	Calgary Flames	82	40	32	10	204	210	90
4	Minnesota Wild	82	38	36	8	219	246	84
5	Edmonton Oilers	82	27	47	8	214	284	62

=== Conference standings ===
Western Conference
R		Div	GP	W	L	OTL	GF	GA	Pts
**1**	**z – San Jose Sharks**	**PA**	**82**	**51**	**20**	**11**	**264**	**215**	113
**2**	**y – Chicago Blackhawks**	**CE**	**82**	**52**	**22**	**8**	**271**	**209**	112
**3**	**y – Vancouver Canucks**	**NW**	**82**	**49**	**28**	**5**	**272**	**222**	103
**4**	**Phoenix Coyotes**	**PA**	**82**	**50**	**25**	**7**	**225**	**202**	107
**5**	**Detroit Red Wings**	**CE**	**82**	**44**	**24**	**14**	**229**	**216**	102
**6**	**Los Angeles Kings**	**PA**	**82**	**46**	**27**	**9**	**241**	**219**	101
**7**	**Nashville Predators**	**CE**	**82**	**47**	**29**	**6**	**225**	**225**	100
**8**	**Colorado Avalanche**	**NW**	**82**	**43**	**30**	**9**	**244**	**233**	95
8.5
9	Calgary Flames	NW	82	40	32	10	225	223	90
10	St. Louis Blues	CE	82	40	32	10	204	210	90
11	Anaheim Ducks	PA	82	39	32	11	238	251	89
12	Dallas Stars	PA	82	37	31	14	237	254	88
13	Minnesota Wild	NW	82	38	36	8	219	246	84
14	Columbus Blue Jackets	CE	82	32	35	15	216	259	79
15	Edmonton Oilers	NW	82	27	47	8	214	284	62

bold – Qualified for playoffs; y – Won division; z – Won conference (and division)

=== Game log ===
2009–10 Game Log

October: 5–9–0 (Home: 4–1–0; Road: 1–8–0)
#	**Date**	**Visitor**	**Score**	**Home**	**OT**	**Decision**	**Attendance**	**Record**	**Pts**	**Recap**
1	October 3	Minnesota Wild	1 - 2	Columbus Blue Jackets		Niklas Backstrom	18,159	0-1-0	0
2	October 6	Anaheim Ducks	3 - 4	Minnesota Wild	OT	Backstrom	18,256	1-1-0	2
3	October 8	Minnesota Wild	3 - 6	Los Angeles Kings		Josh Harding	14,995	1-2-0	2
4	October 10	Minnesota Wild	2 - 4	San Jose Sharks		Backstrom	17,652	1-3-0	2
5	October 14	Minnesota Wild	2 - 3	Anaheim Ducks		Backstrom	15,111	1-4-0	2
6	October 16	Minnesota Wild	2 - 5	Edmonton Oilers		Harding	16,839	1-5-0	2
7	October 17	Minnesota Wild	1 - 2	Vancouver Canucks		Backstrom	18,810	1-6-0	2
8	October 21	Colorado Avalanche	2 - 3	Minnesota Wild	SO	Backstrom	18,175	2-6-0	4
9	October 23	Minnesota Wild	1 - 3	St. Louis Blues		Harding	19,150	2-7-0	4
10	October 24	Carolina Hurricanes	2 - 3	Minnesota Wild	OT	Backstrom	18,145	3-7-0	6
11	October 26	Minnesota Wild	1 - 3	Chicago Blackhawks		Backstrom	20,046	3-8-0	6
12	October 28	Nashville Predators	4 - 3	Minnesota Wild		Harding	18,199	3-9-0	6
13	October 30	New York Rangers	2 - 3	Minnesota Wild		Backstrom	18,106	4-9-0	8
14	October 31	Minnesota Wild	2 - 1	Pittsburgh Penguins		Backstrom	16,980	5-9-0	10

November: 5–3–3 (Home: 3–2–1; Road: 2–1–2)
#	**Date**	**Visitor**	**Score**	**Home**	**OT**	**Decision**	**Attendance**	**Record**	**Pts**	**Recap**
15	November 5	Vancouver Canucks	5 - 2	Minnesota Wild		Backstrom	18,105	5-10-0	10
16	November 7	Dallas Stars	2 - 3	Minnesota Wild		Backstrom	18,558	6-10-0	12
17	November 10	Minnesota Wild	5 - 2	Toronto Maple Leafs		Backstrom	19,063	7-10-0	14
18	November 12	Minnesota Wild	3 - 4	Tampa Bay Lightning	SO	Backstrom	14,530	7-10-1	15
19	November 13	Minnesota Wild	1 - 3	Washington Capitals		Harding	18,277	7-11-1	15
20	November 15	Minnesota Wild	4 - 5	Carolina Hurricanes	SO	Backstrom	12,194	7-11-2	16
21	November 18	Phoenix Coyotes	3 - 2	Minnesota Wild		Backstrom	18,110	7-12-2	16
22	November 20	New York Islanders	2 - 3	Minnesota Wild		Backstrom	18,114	8-12-2	18
23	November 25	Boston Bruins	2 - 1	Minnesota Wild	SO	Backstrom	18,208	8-12-3	19
24	November 27	Colorado Avalanche	3 - 5	Minnesota Wild		Backstrom	18,365	9-12-3	21
25	November 28	Minnesota Wild	3 - 2	Colorado Avalanche	SO	Harding	15,303	10-12-3	23

December: 10–6–0 (Home: 5–2–0; Road: 5–4–0)
#	**Date**	**Visitor**	**Score**	**Home**	**OT**	**Decision**	**Attendance**	**Record**	**Pts**	**Recap**
26	December 2	Nashville Predators	4 - 5	Minnesota Wild	OT	Backstrom	18,071	11-12-3	25
27	December 4	Anaheim Ducks	4 - 5	Minnesota Wild	SO	Backstrom	18,265	12-12-3	27
28	December 5	Minnesota Wild	5 - 3	Nashville Predators		Harding	13,145	13-12-3	29
29	December 7	Minnesota Wild	0 - 2	Phoenix Coyotes		Backstrom	8,981	13-13-3	31
30	December 9	Minnesota Wild	1 - 0	Colorado Avalanche		Backstrom	11,435	14-13-3	33
31	December 11	Minnesota Wild	2 - 1	Calgary Flames	OT	Backstrom	19,289	15-13-3	35
32	December 12	Minnesota Wild	3 - 4	Vancouver Canucks		Harding	18,810	15-14-3	35
33	December 15	Columbus Blue Jackets	1 - 2	Minnesota Wild		Backstrom	18,086	16-14-3	37
34	December 17	Minnesota Wild	3 - 1	Montreal Canadiens		Backstrom	21,273	17-14-3	39
35	December 19	Minnesota Wild	1 - 4	Ottawa Senators		Backstrom	16,259	17-15-3	39
36	December 21	Colorado Avalanche	4 - 3	Minnesota Wild		Backstrom	18,244	17-16-3	39
37	December 23	Edmonton Oilers	1 - 3	Minnesota Wild		Backstrom	18,250	18-16-3	39
38	December 26	St. Louis Blues	3 - 4	Minnesota Wild		Backstrom	18,554	19-16-3	41
39	December 28	Minnesota Wild	4 - 3	Los Angeles Kings		Backstrom	18,118	20-16-3	43
40	December 29	Minnesota Wild	2 - 4	Anaheim Ducks		Harding	16,960	20-17-3	45
41	December 31	Los Angeles Kings	5 - 2	Minnesota Wild		Backstrom	18,504	20-18-3	45

January: 7–6–1 (Home: 6–1–1; Road: 1–5–0)
#	**Date**	**Visitor**	**Score**	**Home**	**OT**	**Decision**	**Attendance**	**Record**	**Pts**	**Recap**
42	January 2	New Jersey Devils	5 - 3	Minnesota Wild		Backstrom	19,155	20-19-3	45
43	January 5	Minnesota Wild	1 - 4	Chicago Blackhawks		Harding	21,381	20-20-3	45
44	January 6	Calgary Flames	1 - 4	Minnesota Wild		Backstrom	18,137	21-20-3	45
45	January 9	Chicago Blackhawks	5 - 6	Minnesota Wild	SO	Harding	19,310	22-20-3	47
46	January 11	Pittsburgh Penguins	3 - 4	Minnesota Wild		Backstrom	19,044	23-20-3	49
47	January 13	Vancouver Canucks	2 - 5	Minnesota Wild		Backstrom	18,356	24-20-3	51
48	January 14	Minnesota Wild	0 - 1	St. Louis Blues		Harding	19,150	24-21-3	51
49	January 16	Minnesota Wild	4 - 6	Phoenix Coyotes		Backstrom	12,631	24-22-3	51
50	January 18	Minnesota Wild	3 - 4	Dallas Stars		Backstrom	16,302	24-23-3	51
51	January 21	Detroit Red Wings	4 - 3	Minnesota Wild	SO	Backstrom	18,330	24-23-4	52
52	January 23	Columbus Blue Jackets	2 - 4	Minnesota Wild		Backstrom	18,173	25-23-4	54
53	January 27	Detroit Red Wings	2 - 5	Minnesota Wild		Harding	18,316	26-23-4	56
54	January 28	Minnesota Wild	1 - 0	Colorado Avalanche		Harding	11,597	27-23-4	58
55	January 30	Minnesota Wild	2 - 5	San Jose Sharks		Harding	17,562	27-24-4	58

February: 3–3–0 (Home: 3–2–0; Road: 0–1–0)
#	**Date**	**Visitor**	**Score**	**Home**	**OT**	**Decision**	**Attendance**	**Record**	**Pts**	**Recap**
56	February 2	Minnesota Wild	2 - 4	Dallas Stars		Wade Dubielewicz	16,729	27-25-4	58
57	February 4	Edmonton Oilers	2 - 4	Minnesota Wild		Anton Khudobin	18,168	28-25-4	60
58	February 6	Philadelphia Flyers	1 - 2	Minnesota Wild		Khudobin	18,640	29-25-4	62
59	February 10	Phoenix Coyotes	3 - 2	Minnesota Wild		Backstrom	18,178	29-26-4	62
60	February 12	Atlanta Thrashers	3 - 2	Minnesota Wild		Backstrom	18,257	29-27-4	62
61	February 14	Vancouver Canucks	2 - 6	Minnesota Wild		Backstrom	19,342	30-27-4	64

March: 7–7–2 (Home: 4–3–1; Road: 3–4–1)
#	**Date**	**Visitor**	**Score**	**Home**	**OT**	**Decision**	**Attendance**	**Record**	**Pts**	**Recap**
62	March 3	Minnesota Wild	4 - 0	Calgary Flames		Backstrom	19,289	31-27-4	66
63	March 5	Minnesota Wild	1 - 2	Edmonton Oilers	SO	Backstrom	16,839	31-27-5	67
64	March 7	Calgary Flames	5 - 2	Minnesota Wild		Backstrom	18,217	31-28-5	67
65	March 9	Florida Panthers	3 - 2	Minnesota Wild	SO	Backstrom	18,191	31-28-6	68
66	March 11	Minnesota Wild	1 - 5	Detroit Red Wings		Harding	19,327	31-29-6	68
67	March 12	Minnesota Wild	3 - 2	Buffalo Sabres		Harding	18,690	32-29-6	70
68	March 14	St. Louis Blues	2 - 4	Minnesota Wild		Harding	18,580	33-29-6	72
69	March 16	Edmonton Oilers	2 - 4	Minnesota Wild		Harding	18,474	34-29-6	74
70	March 18	Minnesota Wild	0 - 5	Nashville Predators		Harding	16,615	34-30-6	74
71	March 19	Minnesota Wild	2 - 4	Columbus Blue Jackets		Harding	16,419	34-31-6	74
72	March 21	Calgary Flames	3 - 4	Minnesota Wild		Harding	18,411	35-31-6	76
73	March 23	San Jose Sharks	4 - 1	Minnesota Wild		Backstrom	18,551	35-32-6	76
74	March 25	Minnesota Wild	4 - 3	Philadelphia Flyers	OT	Backstrom	19,716	36-32-6	78
75	March 26	Minnesota Wild	2 - 6	Detroit Red Wings		Harding	20,066	36-33-6	78
76	March 29	Los Angeles Kings	2 - 3	Minnesota Wild		Backstrom	18,284	37-33-6	80
77	March 31	Chicago Blackhawks	4 - 0	Minnesota Wild		Backstrom	18,933	37-34-6	80

April: 1–2–2 (Home: 0–1–1; Road: 1–1–1)
#	**Date**	**Visitor**	**Score**	**Home**	**OT**	**Decision**	**Attendance**	**Record**	**Pts**	**Recap**
78	April 2	San Jose Sharks	3 - 2	Minnesota Wild		Backstrom	18,584	37-35-6	80
79	April 4	Minnesota Wild	3 - 4	Vancouver Canucks	OT	Backstrom	18,810	37-35-7	81
80	April 5	Minnesota Wild	1 - 4	Edmonton Oilers		Backstrom	16,839	37-36-7	81
81	April 8	Minnesota Wild	2 - 1	Calgary Flames	SO	Dubielewicz	19,289	38-36-7	83
82	April 10	Dallas Stars	4 - 3	Minnesota Wild	SO	Backstrom	19,109	38-36-8	84

**Legend**: Win (2 points) Loss (0 points) Overtime/shootout loss (1 point)

== Player statistics ==
=== Skaters ===
Note: GP = Games played; G = Goals; A = Assists; Pts = Points; +/− = Plus/minus; PIM = Penalty minutes

Regular season

Player	GP	G	A	Pts	+/−	PIM
Mikko Koivu	80	22	49	71	-2	50
Andrew Brunette	82	25	36	61	-5	12
Martin Havlat	73	18	36	54	-19	34
Marek Zidlicky	78	6	37	43	-16	67
Antti Miettinen	79	20	22	42	-2	44
Guillaume Latendresse^{†}	55	25	12	37	1	12
Eric Belanger^{‡}	60	13	22	35	-1	28
Owen Nolan	73	16	17	33	-12	40
Kyle Brodziak	82	9	23	32	-3	22
Cal Clutterbuck	74	13	8	21	-8	52
Nick Schultz	80	1	19	20	-8	43
Brent Burns	47	3	17	20	-15	32
Greg Zanon	81	2	13	15	-10	36
Shane Hnidy	70	2	12	14	-6	66
Kim Johnsson^{‡}	52	6	8	14	3	26
Chuck Kobasew^{†}	42	9	5	14	-9	16
Andrew Ebbett^{†}	49	8	6	14	-8	6
Cam Barker^{†}	19	1	6	7	-2	10
Robbie Earl	32	6	0	6	1	6
James Sheppard	64	2	4	6	-14	38
Derek Boogaard	57	0	4	4	-12	105
Casey Wellman	12	1	3	4	-2	0
Benoit Pouliot^{‡}	14	2	2	4	0	12
Petr Sykora^{‡}	14	2	1	3	-7	8
Clayton Stoner	8	0	2	2	1	12
John Scott	51	1	1	2	-3	90
Cody Almond	7	1	0	1	-3	9
Nate Prosser	3	0	1	1	2	8
Pierre-Marc Bouchard	1	0	0	0	0	2
Nathan Smith	9	0	0	0	-4	12
Andy Hilbert	4	0	0	0	-2	2
Danny Irmen	2	0	0	0	-1	0
Petr Kalus	2	0	0	0	0	0
Jaime Sifers	14	0	0	0	1	6
Justin Falk	3	0	0	0	-2	0
Maxim Noreau	1	0	0	0	0	0

=== Goaltenders ===
Note: GP = Games played; TOI = Time on ice (minutes); W = Wins; L = Losses; OT = Overtime losses; GA = Goals against; GAA= Goals against average; SA= Shots against; SV= Saves; Sv% = Save percentage; SO= Shutouts

Regular season

Player	GP	TOI	W	L	OT	GA	GAA	SA	Sv%	SO	G	A	PIM
Niklas Backstrom	60	3489	26	23	8	158	2.72	1632	.903	2	0	1	4
Josh Harding	25	1300	9	12	0	66	3.05	692	.905	1	0	1	4
Wade Dubielewicz	3	101	1	1	0	5	2.97	34	.853	0	0	0	0
Anton Khudobin	2	69	2	0	0	1	0.87	48	.979	0	0	0	0

^{†}Denotes player spent time with another team before joining Wild. Stats reflect time with Wild only.
^{‡}Traded mid-season. Stats reflect time with Wild only.

== Awards and records ==
=== Awards ===
Regular Season
Player	Award	Awarded
Guillaume Latendresse	NHL Third Star of the Week	January 18, 2010

== Transactions ==
The Wild have been involved in the following transactions during the 2009–10 season.

=== Trades ===
Date	Details
June 26, 2009	To New York Islanders 1st-round pick (12th overall) in 2009	To Minnesota Wild 1st-round pick (16th overall) in 2009; 3rd-round pick (77th overall) in 2009; 7th-round pick (182nd overall) in 2009
June 27, 2009	To Edmonton Oilers 4th-round pick (99th overall) in 2009; 5th-round pick (133rd overall) in 2009	To Minnesota Wild Kyle Brodziak; 6th-round pick (161st overall) in 2009
October 18, 2009	To Boston Bruins Alexander Fallstrom; Craig Weller; 2nd-round pick in 2011	To Minnesota Wild Chuck Kobasew
November 23, 2009	To Montreal Canadiens Benoit Pouliot	To Minnesota Wild Guillaume Latendresse
February 12, 2010	To Chicago Blackhawks Kim Johnsson; Nick Leddy	To Minnesota Wild Cam Barker
March 3, 2010	To Washington Capitals Eric Belanger	To Minnesota Wild 2nd-round pick in 2010

=== Free agents acquired ===
Player	Former team	Contract terms
Greg Zanon	Nashville Predators	3 years, $5.8 million
Martin Havlat	Chicago Blackhawks	6 years, $30 million
Shane Hnidy	Boston Bruins	1 year, $750,000
Jamie Fraser	New York Islanders	1 year
Jaime Sifers	Toronto Maple Leafs	1 year
Duncan Milroy	ERC Ingolstadt	undisclosed
Jon DiSalvatore	Lowell Devils	undisclosed
Wade Dubielewicz	Columbus Blue Jackets	undisclosed
Nathan Smith	Lake Erie Monsters	1 year
Ryan Lannon	San Antonio Rampage	1 year
Petr Sykora	Pittsburgh Penguins	1 year, $1.6 million
Bjorn Krupp	Belleville Bulls	entry-level contract
Andy Hilbert	New York Islanders	1 year
Casey Wellman	University of Massachusetts Amherst	Entry-level contract
Nate Prosser	Colorado College	Entry-level contract
Jarod Palmer	Miami University	1-year entry-level contract

=== Free agents lost ===
Player	New team	Contract terms
Marian Gaborik	New York Rangers	5 years, $37.5 million
Stephane Veilleux	Tampa Bay Lightning	1 year, $750,000
Kurtis Foster	Tampa Bay Lightning	1 year, $600,000
Peter Olvecky	Nashville Predators	1 year, $500,000
Krys Kolanos	Philadelphia Flyers	1 year
Martin Skoula	Pittsburgh Penguins	1 year, $575,000
Marc-Andre Bergeron	Montreal Canadiens	1 year, $750,000

=== Claimed via waivers ===
Player	Former team	Date claimed off waivers
Andrew Ebbett	Chicago Blackhawks	November 21, 2009

=== Lost via waivers ===
Player	New team	Date claimed off waivers

=== Player signings ===
Player	Contract terms
Tyler Cuma	undisclosed
Clayton Stoner	undisclosed
Danny Irmen	undisclosed
Benoit Pouliot	undisclosed
Robbie Earl	undisclosed
Kyle Brodziak	3 years
Josh Harding	1 year, $1.1 million
Cal Clutterbuck	3 years, $4.2 million contract extension
Clayton Stoner	2 years, $1.1 million contract extension
Marek Zidlicky	3 years, $12 million contract extension
Matt Hackett	3-year entry-level contract

== Draft picks ==
Minnesota's picks at the 2009 NHL entry draft in Montreal, Quebec.

Round	#	Player	Position	Nationality	College/Junior/Club team (League)
1	16 (from Columbus via NY Islanders)	Nick Leddy	(D)	United States	Eden Prairie High School (USHS-MN)
3	77 (from NY Islanders via Columbus)	Matt Hackett	(G)	Canada	Plymouth Whalers (OHL)
4	103	Kris Foucault	(LW)	Canada	Calgary Hitmen (WHL)
4	116 (from Boston)	Alexander Fallstrom	(F)	Sweden	Shattuck-Saint Mary's (USHS-MN)
6	161 (from Edmonton)	Darcy Kuemper	(G)	Canada	Red Deer Rebels (WHL)
6	163	Jere Sallinen	(RW/LW)	Finland	Espoo Blues (SM-liiga)
7	182 (from NY Islanders)	Erik Haula	(LW)	Finland	Shattuck-Saint Mary's (USHS-MN)
7	193	Anthony Hamburg	(C)	United States	Dallas Stars (Midget AAA)

== See also ==
- 2009–10 NHL season
