= 2009–10 Columbus Blue Jackets season =

National Hockey League season

2009–10 Columbus Blue Jackets
- Division: 5th Central
- Conference: 14th Western
- 2009–10 record: 32–35–15
- Home record: 20–12–9
- Road record: 12–23–6
- Goals for: 216
- Goals against: 259

Team information
- General manager: Scott Howson
- Coach: Ken Hitchcock (Oct.–Feb.); Claude Noel (Feb.–Apr.) (interim)
- Captain: Rick Nash
- Alternate captains: Mike Commodore; Rostislav Klesla; Fredrik Modin (Oct-Mar); Samuel Pahlsson (Mar.–Apr.); R. J. Umberger; Antoine Vermette
- Arena: Nationwide Arena
- Average attendance: 15,416 (84.9%); Total: 632,056

Team leaders
- Goals: Rick Nash (33)
- Assists: Kristian Huselius (40)
- Points: Rick Nash (67)
- Penalty minutes: Jared Boll (149)
- Plus/minus: Derek Dorsett (+6)
- Wins: Steve Mason (20)
- Goals against average: Mathieu Garon (2.81)

The 2009–10 Columbus Blue Jackets season was the team's tenth season of play in the National Hockey League (NHL). The Blue Jackets were unable to qualify for the playoffs for the first time since the 2007–08 season, despite qualifying the previous year.

== Regular season ==
On February 3, 2010, the Jackets fired head coach Ken Hitchcock and named Claude Noel as interim head coach.

=== Divisional standings ===
Central Division
		GP	W	L	OTL	GF	GA	Pts
**1**	**y – Chicago Blackhawks**	**82**	**52**	**22**	**8**	**271**	**209**	**112**
**2**	**Detroit Red Wings**	**82**	**44**	**24**	**14**	**229**	**216**	**102**
**3**	**Nashville Predators**	**82**	**47**	**29**	**6**	**225**	**225**	**100**
4	St. Louis Blues	82	40	32	10	225	223	90
5	Columbus Blue Jackets	82	32	35	15	216	259	79

=== Conference standings ===
Western Conference
R		Div	GP	W	L	OTL	GF	GA	Pts
**1**	**z – San Jose Sharks**	**PA**	**82**	**51**	**20**	**11**	**264**	**215**	113
**2**	**y – Chicago Blackhawks**	**CE**	**82**	**52**	**22**	**8**	**271**	**209**	112
**3**	**y – Vancouver Canucks**	**NW**	**82**	**49**	**28**	**5**	**272**	**222**	103
**4**	**Phoenix Coyotes**	**PA**	**82**	**50**	**25**	**7**	**225**	**202**	107
**5**	**Detroit Red Wings**	**CE**	**82**	**44**	**24**	**14**	**229**	**216**	102
**6**	**Los Angeles Kings**	**PA**	**82**	**46**	**27**	**9**	**241**	**219**	101
**7**	**Nashville Predators**	**CE**	**82**	**47**	**29**	**6**	**225**	**225**	100
**8**	**Colorado Avalanche**	**NW**	**82**	**43**	**30**	**9**	**244**	**233**	95
8.5
9	Calgary Flames	NW	82	40	32	10	225	223	90
10	St. Louis Blues	CE	82	40	32	10	204	210	90
11	Anaheim Ducks	PA	82	39	32	11	238	251	89
12	Dallas Stars	PA	82	37	31	14	237	254	88
13	Minnesota Wild	NW	82	38	36	8	219	246	84
14	Columbus Blue Jackets	CE	82	32	35	15	216	259	79
15	Edmonton Oilers	NW	82	27	47	8	214	284	62

bold – Qualified for playoffs; y – Won division; z – Won conference (and division)

== Schedule and results ==
- Green background indicates win (2 points).
- Red background indicates regulation loss (0 points).
- Silver background indicates overtime/shootout loss (1 point).

=== Pre-season ===
2009 Pre-season game log: 4–3–1 (home: 3–1–0; road: 1–2–1)
#	Date	Visitor	Score	Home	OT	Decision	Attendance	Record
1	September 15	Columbus Blue Jackets	4 - 5	Pittsburgh Penguins	OT	LaCosta	15,766	0-0-1
2	September 18	Columbus Blue Jackets	0 - 2	Minnesota Wild		Mason	18,064	0-1-1
3	September 19	Columbus Blue Jackets	2 - 3	Nashville Predators		LaCosta	10,703	0-2-1
4	September 21	Minnesota Wild	1 - 5	Columbus Blue Jackets		Mason	10,056	1-2-1
5	September 22	Boston Bruins	5 - 6	Columbus Blue Jackets	SO	Garon	10,571	2-2-1
6	September 24	Pittsburgh Penguins	2 - 5	Columbus Blue Jackets		Mason	12,638	3-2-1
7	September 26	Columbus Blue Jackets	4 - 2	Boston Bruins		Garon	16,711	4-2-1
8	September 27	Nashville Predators	4 - 2	Columbus Blue Jackets		Mason	13,761	4-3-1

=== Regular season ===
2009–10 game log

October: 6–5–1 (home: 3–1–1; road: 3–4–0)
#	Date	Visitor	Score	Home	OT	Decision	Attendance	Record	Pts
1	October 3	Minnesota Wild	1 - 2	Columbus Blue Jackets		Mason	18,159	1-0-0	2
2	October 5	Columbus Blue Jackets	5 - 3	Vancouver Canucks		Mason	18,810	2-0-0	4
3	October 8	Columbus Blue Jackets	3 - 6	San Jose Sharks		Mason	17,562	2-1-0	4
4	October 10	Columbus Blue Jackets	2 - 0	Phoenix Coyotes		Garon	17,532	3-1-0	6
5	October 13	Calgary Flames	1 - 2	Columbus Blue Jackets		Mason	13,280	4-1-0	8
6	October 17	Los Angeles Kings	1 - 4	Columbus Blue Jackets		Mason	15,251	5-1-0	10
7	October 20	Columbus Blue Jackets	3 - 6	Calgary Flames		Mason	19,289	5-2-0	10
8	October 22	Columbus Blue Jackets	4 - 6	Edmonton Oilers		Garon	16,839	5-3-0	10
9	October 24	Columbus Blue Jackets	6 - 4	Anaheim Ducks		Mason	14,468	6-3-0	12
10	October 25	Columbus Blue Jackets	2 - 6	Los Angeles Kings		Mason	15,820	6-4-0	12
11	October 28	Phoenix Coyotes	4 - 1	Columbus Blue Jackets		Mason	13,184	6-5-0	12
12	October 30	Pittsburgh Penguins	4 - 3	Columbus Blue Jackets	SO	Mason	19,136	6-5-1	13

November: 7–4–3 (home: 4–1–2; road: 3–3–1)
#	Date	Visitor	Score	Home	OT	Decision	Attendance	Record	Pts
13	November 1	Columbus Blue Jackets	5 - 4	Washington Capitals	OT	Mason	18,277	7-5-1	15
14	November 4	San Jose Sharks	3 - 2	Columbus Blue Jackets	SO	Mason	13,401	7-5-2	16
15	November 5	Columbus Blue Jackets	4 - 3	Atlanta Thrashers		Garon	10,878	8-5-2	18
16	November 7	Carolina Hurricanes	2 - 3	Columbus Blue Jackets		Mason	14,850	9-5-2	20
17	November 11	Detroit Red Wings	9 - 1	Columbus Blue Jackets		Mason	15,304	9-6-2	20
18	November 13	Anaheim Ducks	2 - 3	Columbus Blue Jackets	SO	Garon	15,577	10-6-2	22
19	November 16	Edmonton Oilers	2 - 3	Columbus Blue Jackets	SO	Garon	13,030	11-6-2	24
20	November 19	Columbus Blue Jackets	4 - 1	Dallas Stars		Mason	16,155	12-6-2	26
21	November 21	Columbus Blue Jackets	3 - 4	Nashville Predators	SO	Mason	13,790	12-6-3	27
22	November 23	Columbus Blue Jackets	4 - 7	New York Rangers		Garon	18,200	12-7-3	27
23	November 24	Columbus Blue Jackets	3 - 5	Montreal Canadiens		Garon	21,273	12-8-3	27
24	November 26	Columbus Blue Jackets	1 - 2	Ottawa Senators		Mason	19,244	12-9-3	27
25	November 28	Calgary Flames	4 - 3	Columbus Blue Jackets	SO	Mason	17,772	12-9-4	28
26	November 30	St. Louis Blues	2 - 5	Columbus Blue Jackets		Mason	12,391	13-9-4	30

December: 2–9–5 (home: 2–4–2; road: 0–5–3)
#	Date	Visitor	Score	Home	OT	Decision	Attendance	Record	Pts
27	December 1	Columbus Blue Jackets	3 - 4	Chicago Blackhawks	SO	Mason	20,363	13-9-5	31
28	December 3	Toronto Maple Leafs	6 - 2	Columbus Blue Jackets		Mason	13,825	13-10-5	31
29	December 5	Colorado Avalanche	3 - 2	Columbus Blue Jackets		Mason	14,909	13-11-5	31
30	December 9	Florida Panthers	0 - 3	Columbus Blue Jackets		Mason	12,800	14-11-5	33
31	December 10	Columbus Blue Jackets	3 - 4	Nashville Predators	SO	Garon	14,601	14-11-6	34
32	December 12	Anaheim Ducks	3 - 1	Columbus Blue Jackets		Mason	14,461	14-12-6	34
33	December 14	Nashville Predators	5 - 3	Columbus Blue Jackets		Mason	12,856	14-13-6	34
34	December 15	Columbus Blue Jackets	1 - 2	Minnesota Wild		Mason	18,086	14-14-6	34
35	December 17	Phoenix Coyotes	2 - 1	Columbus Blue Jackets	SO	Garon	13,363	14-14-7	35
36	December 19	Columbus Blue Jackets	2 - 5	Colorado Avalanche		Mason	11,782	14-15-7	35
37	December 21	Columbus Blue Jackets	2 - 5	Phoenix Coyotes		Garon	9,348	14-16-7	35
38	December 23	Columbus Blue Jackets	1 - 3	Dallas Stars		Mason	16,532	14-17-7	35
39	December 26	Columbus Blue Jackets	1 - 2	Detroit Red Wings		Garon	20,066	14-18-7	35
40	December 28	Detroit Red Wings	0 - 1	Columbus Blue Jackets	OT	Mason	18,421	15-18-7	37
41	December 29	Columbus Blue Jackets	1 - 2	New York Islanders	SO	Mason	12,192	15-18-8	38
42	December 31	Nashville Predators	2 - 1	Columbus Blue Jackets	OT	Garon	18,221	15-18-9	39

January: 7–8–0 (home: 3-3–0; road: 4–5–0)
#	Date	Visitor	Score	Home	OT	Decision	Attendance	Record	Pts
43	January 2	Colorado Avalanche	3 - 2	Columbus Blue Jackets		Mason	17,371	15-19-9	39
44	January 5	Columbus Blue Jackets	3 - 7	Vancouver Canucks		Mason	18,810	15-20-9	39
45	January 7	Columbus Blue Jackets	4 - 2	Edmonton Oilers		Garon	16,839	16-20-9	41
46	January 8	Columbus Blue Jackets	3 - 2	Calgary Flames		Garon	19,289	17-20-9	43
47	January 10	Dallas Stars	0 - 2	Columbus Blue Jackets		Garon	14,501	18-20-9	45
48	January 12	Columbus Blue Jackets	1 - 4	St. Louis Blues		Garon	17,900	18-21-9	45
49	January 14	Columbus Blue Jackets	0 - 3	Chicago Blackhawks		Garon	21,884	18-22-9	45
50	January 16	Chicago Blackhawks	6 - 5	Columbus Blue Jackets		Mason	18,738	18-23-9	45
51	January 18	St. Louis Blues	2 - 4	Columbus Blue Jackets		Garon	14,505	19-23-9	47
52	January 19	Columbus Blue Jackets	3 - 5	Philadelphia Flyers		Garon	19,126	19-24-9	47
53	January 21	Columbus Blue Jackets	3 - 2	Boston Bruins		Mason	17,565	20-24-9	49
54	January 23	Columbus Blue Jackets	2 - 4	Minnesota Wild		Mason	18,173	20-25-9	49
55	January 26	Nashville Predators	2 - 3	Columbus Blue Jackets		Mason	13,775	21-25-9	51
56	January 28	Los Angeles Kings	4 - 1	Columbus Blue Jackets		Mason	13,709	21-26-9	51
57	January 30	Columbus Blue Jackets	3 - 2	St. Louis Blues		Garon	19,150	22-26-9	53

February: 3–2–1 (home: 3–1–1; road: 0–1–0)
#	Date	Visitor	Score	Home	OT	Decision	Attendance	Record	Pts
58	February 2	Columbus Blue Jackets	1 - 5	Colorado Avalanche		Garon	11,213	22-27-9	53
59	February 4	Dallas Stars	1 - 2	Columbus Blue Jackets		Mason	14,028	23-27-9	55
60	February 6	Buffalo Sabres	0 - 4	Columbus Blue Jackets		Mason	18,576	24-27-9	57
61	February 10	San Jose Sharks	0 - 3	Columbus Blue Jackets		Mason	15,234	25-27-9	59
62	February 12	Vancouver Canucks	4 - 3	Columbus Blue Jackets		Mason	16,564	25-28-9	59
63	February 14	Chicago Blackhawks	5 - 4	Columbus Blue Jackets	SO	Garon	17,673	25-28-10	60

March: 7–4-3 (home: 5–1–2; road: 2–3–1)
#	Date	Visitor	Score	Home	OT	Decision	Attendance	Record	Pts
64	March 2	Vancouver Canucks	4 - 3	Columbus Blue Jackets	OT	Mason	14,513	25-28-11	61
65	March 6	Columbus Blue Jackets	1 - 2	San Jose Sharks		Mason	17,562	25-29-11	61
66	March 8	Columbus Blue Jackets	0 - 6	Los Angeles Kings		Mason	17,524	25-30-11	61
67	March 9	Columbus Blue Jackets	5 - 2	Anaheim Ducks		Garon	13,700	26-30-11	63
68	March 11	Atlanta Thrashers	1 - 2	Columbus Blue Jackets		Garon	13,459	27-30-11	65
69	March 13	St. Louis Blues	5 - 1	Columbus Blue Jackets		Mason	16,453	27-31-11	65
70	March 15	Edmonton Oilers	3 - 5	Columbus Blue Jackets		Mason	13,603	28-31-11	67
71	March 19	Minnesota Wild	2 - 4	Columbus Blue Jackets		Garon	16,419	29-31-11	69
72	March 20	Columbus Blue Jackets	0 - 1	Nashville Predators	OT	Mason	16,363	29-31-12	70
73	March 23	Columbus Blue Jackets	3 - 6	New Jersey Devils		Mason	14,202	29-32-12	70
74	March 25	Chicago Blackhawks	3 - 8	Columbus Blue Jackets		Mason	14,573	30-32-12	72
75	March 27	New York Islanders	4 - 3	Columbus Blue Jackets	OT	Garon	16,972	30-32-13	73
76	March 28	Columbus Blue Jackets	4 - 2	Chicago Blackhawks		Mason	22,043	31-32-13	75
77	March 30	Tampa Bay Lightning	2 - 3	Columbus Blue Jackets		Mason	15,760	32-32-13	77

April: 0–3–2 (home: 0–1–1; road: 0–2–1)
#	Date	Visitor	Score	Home	OT	Decision	Attendance	Record	Pts
78	April 1	Columbus Blue Jackets	2 - 3	Detroit Red Wings		Mason	19,259	32-33-13	77
79	April 3	Washington Capitals	3 - 2	Columbus Blue Jackets		Mason	16,957	32-34-13	77
80	April 5	Columbus Blue Jackets	1 - 2	St. Louis Blues	OT	Garon	17,601	32-34-14	78
81	April 7	Columbus Blue Jackets	3 - 4	Detroit Red Wings		Mason	20,066	32-35-14	78
82	April 9	Detroit Red Wings	1 - 0	Columbus Blue Jackets	SO	Mason	18,512	32-35-15	79

== Player statistics ==
=== Skaters ===
Note: GP = Games played; G = Goals; A = Assists; Pts = Points; +/− = Plus/minus; PIM = Penalty minutes

Regular season

Player	GP	G	A	Pts	+/−	PIM
Rick Nash	76	33	34	67	-2	58
Antoine Vermette	82	27	38	65	+2	32
Kristian Huselius	74	23	40	63	-4	36
R. J. Umberger	82	23	32	55	-16	40
Jakub Voracek	81	16	34	50	-7	26
Derick Brassard	79	9	27	36	-17	48
Anton Stralman	73	6	28	34	-17	37
Fedor Tyutin	80	6	26	32	-7	49
Raffi Torres^{‡}	60	19	12	31	-8	32
Kris Russell	70	7	15	22	+3	32
Jason Chimera^{‡}	39	8	9	17	-7	47
Samuel Pahlsson	79	3	13	16	-9	32
Derek Dorsett	51	4	10	14	+6	105
Jan Hejda	62	3	10	13	-14	36
Mike Commodore	57	2	9	11	-9	62
Mathieu Roy^{‡}	31	0	10	10	-2	17
Rostislav Klesla	26	2	6	8	-7	26
Marc Methot	60	2	6	8	-8	51
Andrew Murray	46	5	2	7	-6	6
Jared Boll	68	4	3	7	-8	149
Fredrik Modin^{‡}	24	2	4	6	-6	12
Chris Clark^{†}	36	3	2	5	-8	21
Derek MacKenzie	18	1	3	4	+3	0
Mike Blunden	40	2	2	4	+3	59
Milan Jurcina^{†‡}	17	1	2	3	+2	10
Grant Clitsome	11	1	2	3	0	6
Nikita Filatov	13	2	0	2	0	8
Tomas Kana	6	0	2	2	+2	2
Alexandre Picard^{‡}	9	0	0	0	-3	10
Tom Sestito	3	0	0	0	0	7
Trevor Frischmon	3	0	0	0	0	4
Maksim Mayorov	4	0	0	0	-1	0
Nathan Paetsch^{†}	10	0	0	0	-5	6
Greg Moore	4	0	0	0	0	0
Chad Kolarik	2	0	0	0	-1	0

=== Goaltenders ===
Note: GP = Games played; TOI = Time on ice (minutes); W = Wins; L = Losses; OT = Overtime losses; GA = Goals against; GAA= Goals against average; SA= Shots against; SV= Saves; Sv% = Save percentage; SO= Shutouts

Regular season

Player	GP	TOI	W	L	OT	GA	GAA	SA	Sv%	SO	G	A	PIM
Steve Mason	58	3201	20	26	9	163	3.06	1653	.901	5	0	2	2
Mathieu Garon	35	1771	12	9	6	83	2.81	858	.903	2	0	0	2

^{†}Denotes player spent time with another team before joining Blue Jackets. Stats reflect time with the Blue Jackets only.
^{‡}Traded mid-season
Italics denotes franchise record

== Awards and records ==
=== Awards ===
Regular season
Player	Award	Awarded
Mathieu Garon	NHL Third Star of the Week	January 11, 2010

=== Records ===
Player	Record	Number	Reached
Steve Mason	Career Shutouts	13	February 6, 2010

=== Milestones ===
Regular season
Player	Milestone	Reached
Rick Nash	200th NHL Goal	October 24, 2009
Antoine Vermette	100th NHL Goal	January 8, 2010
Mathieu Garon	100th NHL Win	January 8, 2010
Grant Clitsome	1st NHL Point; 1st NHL Assist	March 2, 2010
Mike Blunden	1st NHL Point; 1st NHL Assist	March 9, 2010
Fedor Tyutin	100th NHL Assist	March 11, 2010
Mike Blunden	1st NHL Goal	March 25, 2010
Grant Clitsome	1st NHL Goal	March 27, 2010
Tomas Kana	1st NHL Point; 1st NHL Assist	April 7, 2010

== Transactions ==
The Blue Jackets have been involved in the following transactions during the 2009–10 season.

=== Trades ===
Date	Details
June 26, 2009	To New York Islanders 1st-round pick (16th overall) in 2009; 3rd-round pick (77th overall) in 2009	To Columbus Blue Jackets 1st-round pick (26th overall) in 2009; 2nd-round pick (37th overall) in 2009; 3rd-round pick (62nd overall) in 2009; 4th-round pick (92nd overall) in 2009
June 26, 2009	To Anaheim Ducks 1st-round pick (26th overall) in 2009; 2nd-round pick (37th overall) in 2009	To Columbus Blue Jackets 1st-round pick (21st overall) in 2009
June 27, 2009	To New York Islanders 3rd-round pick (62nd overall) in 2009; 4th-round pick (92nd overall) in 2009	To Columbus Blue Jackets 2nd-round pick (56th overall) in 2009
September 28, 2009	To Calgary Flames 3rd-round pick in 2010	To Columbus Blue Jackets Anton Stralman
October 8, 2009	To Atlanta Thrashers Future considerations	To Columbus Blue Jackets Jordan LaVallee-Smotherman
October 20, 2009	To Philadelphia Flyers Stefan Legein	To Columbus Blue Jackets Michael Ratchuk
December 8, 2009	To St. Louis Blues Pascal Pelletier	To Columbus Blue Jackets Brendan Bell; Tomas Kana
December 28, 2009	To Washington Capitals Jason Chimera	To Columbus Blue Jackets Chris Clark; Milan Jurcina
March 1, 2010	To New York Islanders Dylan Reese	To Columbus Blue Jackets Greg Moore
March 3, 2010	To Buffalo Sabres Raffi Torres	To Columbus Blue Jackets Nathan Paetsch; 2nd-round pick in 2010
March 3, 2010	To Washington Capitals Milan Jurcina	To Columbus Blue Jackets Conditional 6th-round pick in 2010 (Note: Condition not satisfied.)
March 3, 2010	To Los Angeles Kings Fredrik Modin	To Columbus Blue Jackets Conditional 7th-round pick in 2010 (Note: Condition not satisfied.)
March 3, 2010	To Florida Panthers Mathieu Roy	To Columbus Blue Jackets Matt Rust
March 3, 2010	To Phoenix Coyotes Alexandre Picard	To Columbus Blue Jackets Chad Kolarik

=== Free agents acquired ===
Player	Former team	Contract terms
Samuel Pahlsson	Chicago Blackhawks	3 years, $7.95 million
Mathieu Garon	Pittsburgh Penguins	2 years, $2.4 million
Pascal Pelletier	Chicago Blackhawks	1 year, 2-way contract
Mathieu Roy	Springfield Falcons	1 year, 2-way contract
David Liffiton	EfB Ishockey	2-way contract
Dylan Reese	San Antonio Rampage	2-way contract

=== Free agents lost ===
Player	New team	Contract terms
Aaron Rome	Vancouver Canucks	1 year, $550,000
Wade Dubielewicz	Minnesota Wild	undisclosed
Ole-Kristian Tollefsen	Philadelphia Flyers	1 year, $600,000
Jason Williams	Detroit Red Wings	1 year, $1.5 million
Craig MacDonald	DEG Metro Stars	undisclosed
Mike York	Rochester Americans	1 year
Manny Malhotra	San Jose Sharks	1 year, $700,000

=== Claimed via waivers ===
Player	Former team	Date claimed off waivers

=== Lost via waivers ===
Player	New team	Date claimed off waivers

=== Lost via retirement ===
Player
Michael Peca

=== Player signings ===
Player	Contract terms
Brent Regner	3-year entry-level contract
Trevor Frischmon	1 year, 2-way contract
Rick Nash	8 years, $62.4 million extension
Jonathan Sigalet	2 year, 2-way contract
Mike Blunden	1 year, 2-way contract
John Moore	3-year entry-level contract
Marc Methot	2 years
Dan LaCosta	1 year, 2-way contract
Derick Brassard	4 years, $13 million extension
Alexandre Picard	1 year
Derek Dorsett	2 year contract extension
Antoine Vermette	5 year, $18.75 million contract extension
Matt Calvert	3-year entry-level contract

== Draft picks ==
Columbus had six picks at the 2009 NHL entry draft in Montreal, Quebec.

Round	#	Player	Position	Nationality	College/Junior/Club team (League)
1	21 (from Philadelphia via Anaheim)	John Moore	(D)	United States	Chicago Steel (USHL)
2	56 (from Boston via NY Islanders)	Kevin Lynch	(C)	United States	U.S. National Team Development Program (USHL)
4	94 (from Colorado)	David Savard	(D)	Canada	Moncton Wildcats (QMJHL)
5	137	Thomas Larkin	(D)	Italy	(Exeter High School) (USHS-NH)
6	167	Anton Blomqvist	(D)	Sweden	Malmo Redhawks Jr. (J20 SuperElit)
7	197	Kyle Neuber	(RW)	Canada	Mississauga St. Michael's Majors (OHL)

== See also ==
- 2009–10 NHL season

== Farm teams ==
The American Hockey League's Syracuse Crunch and the ECHL's Gwinnett Gladiators are the Blue Jackets' minor league affiliates for the 2009–10 season.
