= Chris Durno =

Canadian ice hockey player (born 1980)

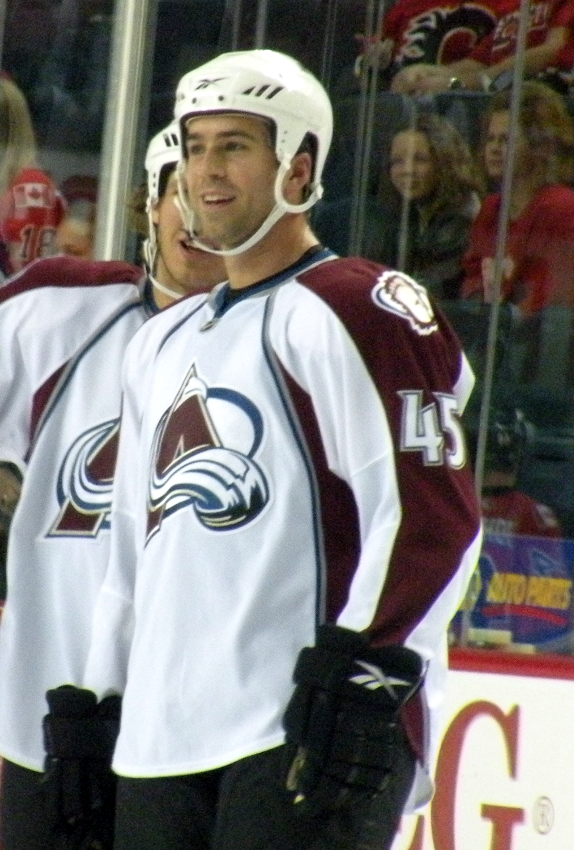
- Born: October 31, 1980 (age 45) Scarborough, Ontario, Canada
- Height: 6 ft 4 in (193 cm)
- Weight: 205 lb (93 kg; 14 st 9 lb)
- Position: Left wing
- Shot: Left
- Played for: Colorado Avalanche; Ritten-Renon
- NHL draft: Undrafted
- Playing career: 2003–2013

Christopher Scott Durno (born October 31, 1980) is a Canadian former professional ice hockey player who played in the National Hockey League (NHL) for the Colorado Avalanche.

== Playing career ==
As a youth, Durno played in the 1994 Quebec International Pee-Wee Hockey Tournament with a minor ice hockey team from North York.

Undrafted, Durno spent four years playing collegiate hockey with Michigan Tech. After turning pro, Durno spent time in the ECHL with the Gwinnett Gladiators and the Milwaukee Admirals of the American Hockey League (AHL). After being invited to the Chicago Blackhawks training camp for the start of the 2006–07 season, Durno was signed on September 25, 2006, and assigned to the affiliate, the Norfolk Admirals.

On December 28, 2006, Durno was traded along with Sébastien Caron and Matt Keith to the Anaheim Ducks in exchange for Bruno St. Jacques and P. A. Parenteau. Durno's tenure with the Ducks only lasted one month before he was traded to the Nashville Predators for Shane Endicott on January 26, 2007. The Predators then sent Durno to their affiliate, the Milwaukee Admirals, and in result became just the third player to represent both Norfolk and Milwaukee Admirals in the same season.

Durno spent the 2007–08 season with the San Antonio Rampage of the AHL. On July 3, 2008, Durno signed as a free agent with the Colorado Avalanche to a one-year deal. He started the 2008–09 season with the Lake Erie Monsters and received his first ever NHL callup on December 30, 2008, however did not play a game. On January 18, 2009, Durno was re-called again for the Avalanche, and made his NHL debut in a 6–2 win over the Calgary Flames.

Moving back and forth between the Avs and the Monsters for much of the first half of the 2009–10 campaign, Durno finally scored his first NHL goal on December 26, 2009, against Alex Auld of the Dallas Stars in front of a sold-out crowd at the Pepsi Center, a game the Avalanche won 4–1.

On July 25, 2010, Durno signed a one-year contract as a free agent with the Tampa Bay Lightning. He failed to debut with the Lightning during the 2010–11 season, playing as captain in his return to the AHL affiliate, the Norfolk Admirals.

Durno signed a one-year contract with the Carolina Hurricanes on July 15, 2011, and was assigned to their AHL affiliate, the Charlotte Checkers. On October 6, 2011, he was named as an alternate captain for the team. With injury limiting Durno's effectiveness, he suffered a downturn in scoring to post just 5 goals in 53 games during the 2011–12 season with the Checkers.

Once again a free agent in the off-season, Durno's effort for a new contract was hampered by the 2012–13 NHL lockout. Midway into the 2012–13 season, Durno was signed to his first European contract with Italian club, Sport Ritten-Renon, on November 20, 2012.

Prior to pursuing a career as a professional hockey player, Durno played lacrosse for the Toronto Beaches, where he earned enough recognition for his services that he was drafted by the Toronto Rock in the 5th round (64th overall) 2001 NLL Entry Draft.

== Career statistics ==
			Regular season					Playoffs
Season	Team	League	GP	G	A	Pts	PIM	GP	G	A	Pts	PIM
1999–00	Michigan Tech	WCHA	24	1	1	2	30	—	—	—	—	—
2000–01	Michigan Tech	WCHA	35	9	6	15	46	—	—	—	—	—
2001–02	Michigan Tech	WCHA	36	7	8	15	48	—	—	—	—	—
2002–03	Michigan Tech	WCHA	35	5	11	16	60	—	—	—	—	—
2003–04	Gwinnett Gladiators	ECHL	68	20	26	46	46	13	7	5	12	10
2004–05	Gwinnett Gladiators	ECHL	66	20	36	56	101	8	5	2	7	8
2005–06	Gwinnett Gladiators	ECHL	13	12	10	22	19	—	—	—	—	—
2005–06	Milwaukee Admirals	AHL	57	20	20	40	52	21	2	2	4	18
2006–07	Norfolk Admirals	AHL	22	4	1	5	61	—	—	—	—	—
2006–07	Portland Pirates	AHL	12	1	1	2	2	—	—	—	—	—
2006–07	Milwaukee Admirals	AHL	29	13	3	16	24	4	1	2	3	10
2007–08	San Antonio Rampage	AHL	80	23	26	49	109	7	0	2	2	26
2008–09	Lake Erie Monsters	AHL	76	18	27	45	131	—	—	—	—	—
2008–09	Colorado Avalanche	NHL	2	0	0	0	0	—	—	—	—	—
2009–10	Lake Erie Monsters	AHL	17	10	8	18	20	—	—	—	—	—
2009–10	Colorado Avalanche	NHL	41	4	4	8	47	1	0	0	0	0
2010–11	Norfolk Admirals	AHL	73	19	17	36	120	3	0	0	0	4
2011–12	Charlotte Checkers	AHL	53	5	7	12	58	—	—	—	—	—
2012–13	Ritten-Renon	ITL	22	10	12	22	40	7	3	3	6	6
NHL totals			43	4	4	8	47	1	0	0	0	0
