= Joe Callahan (ice hockey) =

American ice hockey player (born 1982)

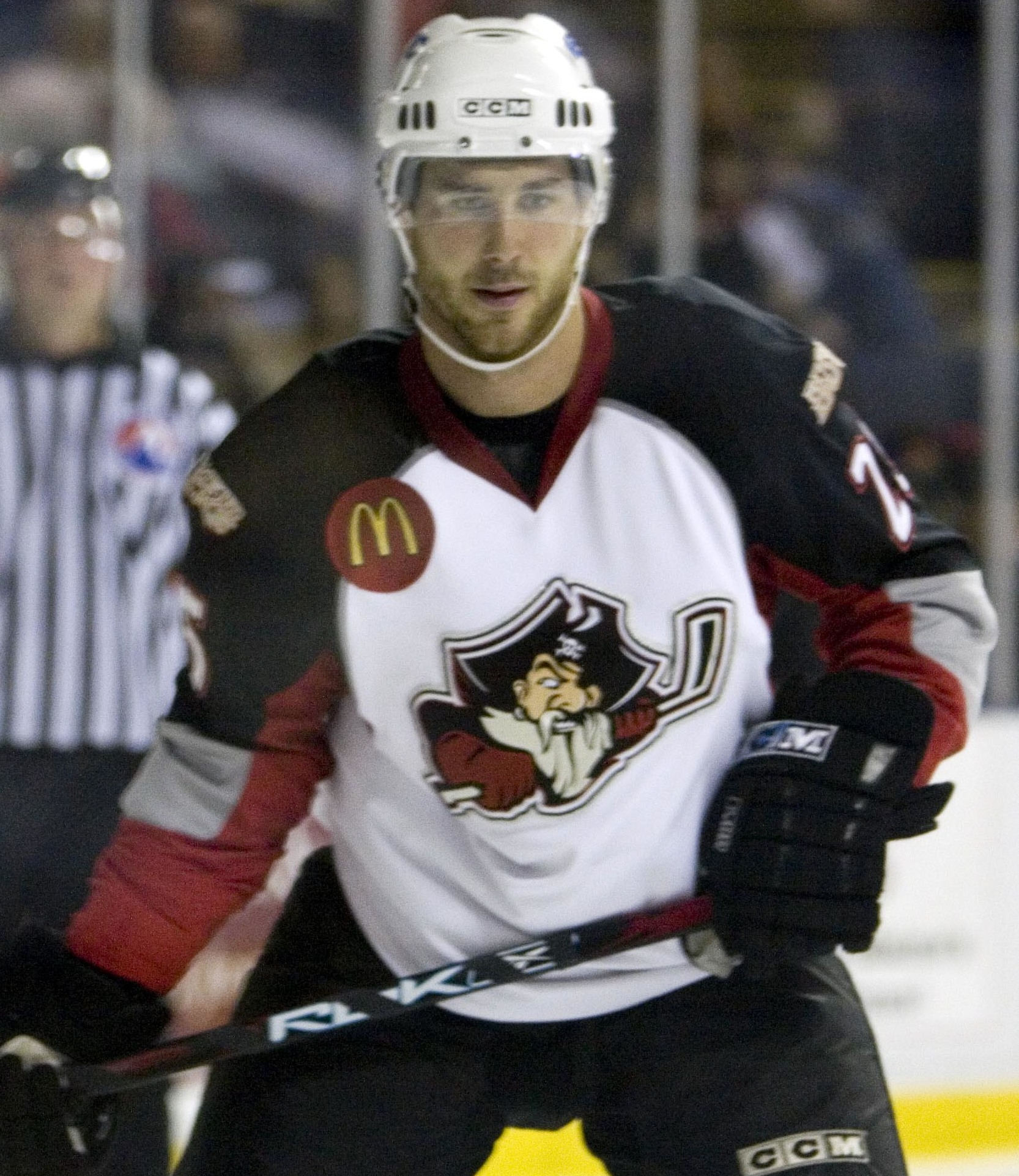
- Callahan with the Portland Pirates in 2007
- Born: December 20, 1982 (age 43) Brockton, Massachusetts, U.S.
- Height: 6 ft 3 in (191 cm)
- Weight: 221 lb (100 kg; 15 st 11 lb)
- Position: Defense
- Shot: Right
- Played for: New York Islanders; San Jose Sharks; Florida Panthers
- NHL draft: 70th overall, 2002; Phoenix Coyotes
- Playing career: 2004–2013

Joseph Michael Callahan (born December 20, 1982) is an American former professional ice hockey defenseman who played in the National Hockey League. Callahan was born in Brockton, Massachusetts, but grew up in nearby Abington.

== Playing career ==
Callahan was drafted 70th overall in the 2002 NHL entry draft by the Phoenix Coyotes. After three years of Collegiate Hockey with Yale University, he made his professional debut with the Coyotes affiliate, the Springfield Falcons of the AHL, at the end of the 2003–04 season.

After three years with the Coyotes' minor league affiliates, Callahan signed as a free agent with the Anaheim Ducks on July 12, 2007. Joe was then assigned to the Ducks affiliate, the Portland Pirates, where he spent the entire 2007–08 season.

On July 8, 2008, he signed a one-year contract with the New York Islanders. After starting the 2008–09 season with the Bridgeport Sound Tigers, Callahan made his NHL debut with the Islanders in a 4–3 defeat against the Philadelphia Flyers on December 9, 2008. Callahan finished the season, playing in 18 games.

On July 16, 2009, Callahan was signed by the San Jose Sharks on a one-year contract for the 2009–10 season. He scored 15 points in 35 games with the AHL's Worcester Sharks and recorded an assist in his lone San Jose appearance in a 2–1 defeat to the Detroit Red Wings on November 5, 2009.

On August 3, 2010, Callahan left the Sharks and signed a one-year free agent contract with the Florida Panthers. He split the 2010–11 season, between the Rochester Americans and the Panthers, appearing in a career-high 27 games.

On October 7, 2011, the Montreal Canadiens signed Callahan to a one-year, two-way contract. He was later reassigned by the Canadiens to AHL affiliate, the Hamilton Bulldogs, for the duration of his contract.

On July 24, 2012, Callahan signed a one-year AHL contract with the Abbotsford Heat.

== Personal life ==
At Yale, Callahan's roommate was fellow professional hockey player and ex-Florida Panther teammate Chris Higgins.

== Career statistics ==
			Regular season					Playoffs
Season	Team	League	GP	G	A	Pts	PIM	GP	G	A	Pts	PIM
2000–01	Boston College High School	HSMA
2001–02	Yale University	ECAC	31	3	8	11	20	—	—	—	—	—
2002–03	Yale University	ECAC	32	2	11	13	38	—	—	—	—	—
2003–04	Yale University	ECAC	31	6	14	20	38	—	—	—	—	—
2003–04	Springfield Falcons	AHL	13	0	4	4	12	—	—	—	—	—
2004–05	Utah Grizzlies	AHL	75	4	7	11	66	—	—	—	—	—
2005–06	San Antonio Rampage	AHL	80	1	5	6	88	—	—	—	—	—
2006–07	San Antonio Rampage	AHL	78	1	13	14	65	—	—	—	—	—
2007–08	Portland Pirates	AHL	65	1	23	24	59	18	1	11	12	35
2008–09	Bridgeport Sound Tigers	AHL	56	4	9	13	38	5	1	2	3	4
2008–09	New York Islanders	NHL	18	0	2	2	4	—	—	—	—	—
2009–10	Worcester Sharks	AHL	35	4	11	15	19	2	0	0	0	2
2009–10	San Jose Sharks	NHL	1	0	1	1	0	—	—	—	—	—
2010–11	Rochester Americans	AHL	48	4	9	13	12	—	—	—	—	—
2010–11	Florida Panthers	NHL	27	0	1	1	12	—	—	—	—	—
2011–12	Hamilton Bulldogs	AHL	60	3	17	20	50	—	—	—	—	—
2012–13	Abbotsford Heat	AHL	64	0	10	10	44	—	—	—	—	—
AHL totals			574	22	108	130	453	25	2	13	15	31
NHL totals			46	0	4	4	16	—	—	—	—	—
