= Scott Valentine (ice hockey) =

Canadian ice hockey player (born 1991)

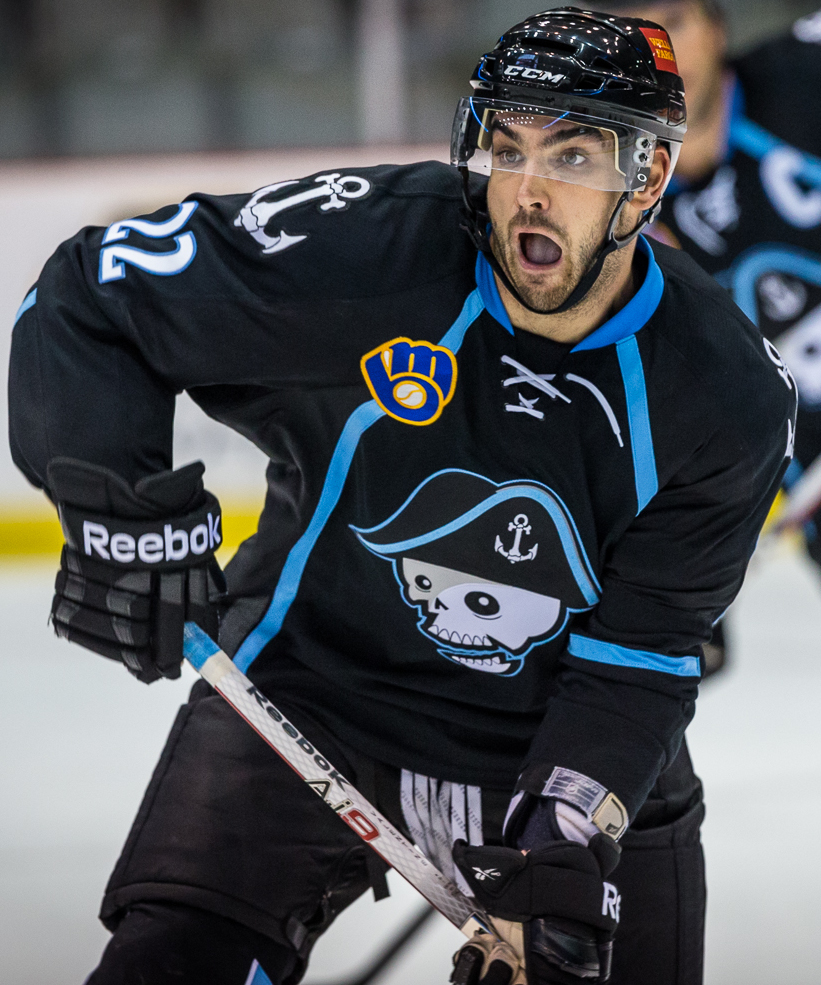
- Valentine with the Milwaukee Admirals in 2013
- Born: May 2, 1991 (age 35) Metcalfe, Ontario, Canada
- Height: 6 ft 2 in (188 cm)
- Weight: 196 lb (89 kg; 14 st 0 lb)
- Position: Defence
- Shoots: Left
- ICEHL team Former teams: HC Bolzano; Milwaukee Admirals; Texas Stars; Krefeld Pinguine; Augsburger Panther
- NHL draft: 166th overall, 2009; Anaheim Ducks
- Playing career: 2011–present

Scott Valentine (born May 2, 1991) is a Canadian professional ice hockey defenceman. He is currently playing for HC Bolzano of the ICE Hockey League (ICEHL). Valentine was selected by the Anaheim Ducks in the sixth round (166th overall) of the 2009 NHL entry draft. He was born in Metcalfe, Ontario (now Ottawa, Ontario).

== Playing career ==
Valentine played major junior hockey in the Ontario Hockey League (OHL). On September 30, 2011, the Nashville Predators of the National Hockey League (NHL) signed Valentine as a free agent to a three-year, entry-level contract. For the duration of his entry-level contract Valentine was assigned to AHL affiliate, the Milwaukee Admirals.

Unsigned by the Predators, and released to free agency, Valentine began the 2014–15 season, with the Idaho Steelheads of the ECHL. After posting six assists in 12 games with the Steelheads, Valentine was signed by AHL affiliate, the Texas Stars, for the remainder of the season on November 19, 2014.

As a free agent, Valentine left North America to sign a contract during the 2015–16 season in Germany with Krefeld Pinguine of the DEL on October 4, 2015.

Valentine opted to continue in the German league the following season, signing as a free agent with rivals, Augsburger Panther to a one-year deal on May 13, 2016.

Valentine played six seasons on the blueline in Augsburg, before leaving as a free agent to sign a one-year deal with Italian based, HC Bolzano of the ICEHL, on July 27, 2022.
