= 2009–10 Phoenix Coyotes season =

NHL hockey team season

2009–10 Phoenix Coyotes
- Division: 2nd Pacific
- Conference: 4th Western
- 2009–10 record: 50–25–7
- Home record: 29–10–2
- Road record: 21–15–5
- Goals for: 223
- Goals against: 199

Team information
- General manager: Don Maloney
- Coach: Dave Tippett
- Captain: Shane Doan
- Alternate captains: Ed Jovanovski; Zbynek Michalek
- Arena: Jobing.com Arena
- Average attendance: 11,989 (68.5%)

Team leaders
- Goals: Lee Stempniak (27)
- Assists: Wojtek Wolski (42)
- Points: Wojtek Wolski (65)
- Penalty minutes: Paul Bissonnette (117)
- Plus/minus: Wojtek Wolski (+20)
- Wins: Ilya Bryzgalov (42)
- Goals against average: Jason LaBarbera (2.13)

The 2009–10 Phoenix Coyotes season was the franchise's 38th overall season, its 31st in the National Hockey League (NHL) and its 14th season as the Phoenix Coyotes. After numerous seasons of losing money, the team was placed into bankruptcy and taken over by the NHL. A plan to move the team to Hamilton, Ontario, was rejected by the bankruptcy court.

== Bankruptcy ==
Coyotes owner Jerry Moyes put the team into Chapter 11 bankruptcy during the off-season, and proposed to the court that an offer by Canadian Jim Balsillie for over $200 million be accepted and the team moved to Hamilton, Ontario. The NHL challenged the plan in court and court hearings were held over the summer in Arizona Court. Two other prospective buyers were recruited by the NHL to submit bids to purchase the team but neither made any formal offers to the bankruptcy court. The NHL was the only other group that made a formal offer in court. At first, neither offer had been accepted by the court; Balsillie's bid was rejected outright by the court, stating that it recognized the right of the league to control ownership and relocation, and not allow bankruptcy to be used as a back door. The NHL's bid was rejected because it did not propose to pay Moyes or Wayne Gretzky any money owed. The NHL and Moyes later came to an agreement and the transfer to the NHL was accepted by the court.

After the sale of the team to the NHL, the team fell under the supervision of the NHL. The team arranged a budget under the NHL ownership while allowing general manager Don Maloney to run the club. At the trade deadline, Maloney was the most active trader, making seven trades to improve his club for the playoffs. This was reported to have caused complaints to NHL Commissioner Gary Bettman from other general managers.

Fan attendance was a disappointment for the club, however, and figures supplied to the bankruptcy court showed that the club lost $5 million for the month of October alone. The club finished with the league's worst attendance, and in a lawsuit filed by the NHL against Moyes, the NHL estimated that the team would lose $20 million for the season.

== Off-season ==
In the Entry Draft, the Coyotes picked Oliver Ekman-Larsson with their first-round pick, sixth overall. Otherwise, it was a quiet off-season.

The team signed numerous NHL veteran free agents in the off-season, including Vernon Fiddler, Jason LaBarbera, Adrian Aucoin, Taylor Pyatt, Ryan Hollweg and Robert Lang. This represented a change in direction from previous seasons, which emphasized the development of young prospects.

== Preseason ==
Head coach Gretzky resigned during the training camp period. Neither Balsillie nor the NHL proposed to retain Gretzky on his $8 million contract. On September 24, the Coyotes hired Dave Tippett as their new head coach after Gretzky had resigned earlier the same day.

2009 Pre-season game log: 3–2–3 (Home: 2–1–1; Road: 1–1–2)
#	Date	Visitor	Score	Home	OT	Decision	Record	Recap
1	September 15	Los Angeles Kings	2–4	Phoenix Coyotes		Bryzgalov	1–0–0
2	September 15	Phoenix Coyotes	3–4	Los Angeles Kings		Montoya	1–1–0
3	September 16	Phoenix Coyotes	2–3	Anaheim Ducks	SO	LaBarbera	1–1–1
4	September 18	Anaheim Ducks	4–3	Phoenix Coyotes	OT	Tordjman	1–1–2
5	September 19	Phoenix Coyotes	4–5	San Jose Sharks	OT	LaBarbera	1–1–3
3	September 22 (in Everett, WA)	Tampa Bay Lightning	2–1	Phoenix Coyotes		Bryzgalov	1–2–3
4	September 23 (in Loveland, CO)	Phoenix Coyotes	4–3	Tampa Bay Lightning	SO	LaBarbera	2–2–3
5	September 26	San Jose Sharks	0–2	Phoenix Coyotes		Bryzgalov	3–2–3

== Regular season ==
Despite all the uncertainty surrounding the team, the Coyotes started well, compiling a 9–4–0 record in October.

The regular season was, statistically speaking, the best in the franchise's 38-year history. The team finished with 107 points, the most the team has ever earned in any season, NHL or WHA.

On March 13, the Coyotes won their 41st regular season game over the Carolina Hurricanes, breaking the Coyotes previous one-season record for wins (40 in 2001–02). On March 18, the Coyotes beat the Vancouver Canucks 4–3 in a shootout to record the 44th win of the season, setting a new franchise record for wins as an NHL team with 44. The franchise's previous NHL record was 43 wins, by the Winnipeg Jets. On March 27, the Coyotes defeated the Dallas Stars 3–2 in a shootout to notch their 97th point for the season, passing the 1984–85 Jets for the highest point total in the NHL portion of franchise history. On March 27, the Coyotes defeated the Colorado Avalanche 6–2 to surpass the 100-point mark for the first time ever as an NHL team, and for the first time since 1977–78 in the WHA.

=== Division standings ===
Pacific Division
		GP	W	L	OTL	GF	GA	Pts
**1**	**z – San Jose Sharks**	**82**	**51**	**20**	**11**	**264**	**215**	**113**
**2**	**Phoenix Coyotes**	**82**	**50**	**25**	**7**	**225**	**202**	**107**
**3**	**Los Angeles Kings**	**82**	**46**	**27**	**9**	**241**	**219**	**101**
4	Anaheim Ducks	82	39	32	11	238	251	89
5	Dallas Stars	82	37	31	14	237	254	88

=== Conference standings ===
Western Conference
R		Div	GP	W	L	OTL	GF	GA	Pts
**1**	**z – San Jose Sharks**	**PA**	**82**	**51**	**20**	**11**	**264**	**215**	113
**2**	**y – Chicago Blackhawks**	**CE**	**82**	**52**	**22**	**8**	**271**	**209**	112
**3**	**y – Vancouver Canucks**	**NW**	**82**	**49**	**28**	**5**	**272**	**222**	103
**4**	**Phoenix Coyotes**	**PA**	**82**	**50**	**25**	**7**	**225**	**202**	107
**5**	**Detroit Red Wings**	**CE**	**82**	**44**	**24**	**14**	**229**	**216**	102
**6**	**Los Angeles Kings**	**PA**	**82**	**46**	**27**	**9**	**241**	**219**	101
**7**	**Nashville Predators**	**CE**	**82**	**47**	**29**	**6**	**225**	**225**	100
**8**	**Colorado Avalanche**	**NW**	**82**	**43**	**30**	**9**	**244**	**233**	95
8.5
9	Calgary Flames	NW	82	40	32	10	225	223	90
10	St. Louis Blues	CE	82	40	32	10	204	210	90
11	Anaheim Ducks	PA	82	39	32	11	238	251	89
12	Dallas Stars	PA	82	37	31	14	237	254	88
13	Minnesota Wild	NW	82	38	36	8	219	246	84
14	Columbus Blue Jackets	CE	82	32	35	15	216	259	79
15	Edmonton Oilers	NW	82	27	47	8	214	284	62

bold – Qualified for playoffs; y – Won division; z – Won conference (and division)

=== Game log ===
2009–10 game log

October: 9–4–0 (Home: 4–2–0; Road: 5–2–0)
#	**Date**	**Visitor**	**Score**	**Home**	**OT**	**Decision**	**Attendance**	**Record**	**Pts**	**Recap**
1	October 3	Phoenix Coyotes	6–3	Los Angeles Kings		Bryzgalov	18,118	1–0–0	2
2	October 7	Phoenix Coyotes	3–0	Pittsburgh Penguins		Bryzgalov	16,975	2–0–0	4
3	October 8	Phoenix Coyotes	1–2	Buffalo Sabres		LaBarbera	18,690	2–1–0	4
4	October 10	Columbus Blue Jackets	2–0	Phoenix Coyotes		Bryzgalov	17,532	2–2–0	4
5	October 12	Phoenix Coyotes	1–0	San Jose Sharks	SO	Bryzgalov	17,562	3–2–0	6
6	October 15	St. Louis Blues	2–3	Phoenix Coyotes	OT	Bryzgalov	6,899	4–2–0	8
7	October 17	Boston Bruins	1–4	Phoenix Coyotes		Bryzgalov	9,162	5–2–0	10
8	October 22	Detroit Red Wings	2–3	Phoenix Coyotes	OT	Bryzgalov	11,938	6–2–0	12
9	October 24	Los Angeles Kings	5–3	Phoenix Coyotes		Bryzgalov	7,968	6–3–0	12
10	October 26	Phoenix Coyotes	2–5	New York Rangers		Bryzgalov	18,200	6–4–0	12
11	October 28	Phoenix Coyotes	4–1	Columbus Blue Jackets		LaBarbera	13,184	7–4–0	14
12	October 29	Phoenix Coyotes	2–0	St. Louis Blues		Bryzgalov	18,087	8–4–0	16
13	October 31	Anaheim Ducks	2–3	Phoenix Coyotes	SO	Bryzgalov	6,495	9–4–0	18

November: 6–7–1 (Home: 4–3–0; Road: 2–4–1)
#	**Date**	**Visitor**	**Score**	**Home**	**OT**	**Decision**	**Attendance**	**Record**	**Pts**	**Recap**
14	November 2	Los Angeles Kings	5–3	Phoenix Coyotes		Labarbera	5,855	9–5–0	18
15	November 4	Phoenix Coyotes	1–4	Colorado Avalanche		Bryzgalov	11,012	9–6–0	18
16	November 5	Chicago Blackhawks	1–3	Phoenix Coyotes		Bryzgalov	10,362	10–6–0	20
17	November 7	Phoenix Coyotes	3–4	Anaheim Ducks		Bryzgalov	15,269	10–7–0	20
18	November 12	Montreal Canadiens	4–2	Phoenix Coyotes		Bryzgalov	10,064	10–8–0	20
19	November 14	Dallas Stars	2–3	Phoenix Coyotes		Bryzgalov	11,319	11–8–0	22
20	November 16	Tampa Bay Lightning	4–1	Phoenix Coyotes		LaBarbera	9,503	11–9–0	22
21	November 18	Phoenix Coyotes	3–2	Minnesota Wild		Bryzgalov	18,110	12–9–0	24
22	November 19	Phoenix Coyotes	2–3	St. Louis Blues	OT	Bryzgalov	17,107	12–9–1	25
23	November 21	Philadelphia Flyers	1–3	Phoenix Coyotes		Bryzgalov	11,106	13–9–1	27
24	November 23	Phoenix Coyotes	0–4	Edmonton Oilers		Bryzgalov	16,839	13–10–1	27
25	November 25	Phoenix Coyotes	1–2	Calgary Flames		Bryzgalov	19,289	13–11–1	27
26	November 27	Dallas Stars	2–5	Phoenix Coyotes		Bryzgalov	10,691	14–11–1	29
27	November 29	Phoenix Coyotes	3–2	Anaheim Ducks	OT	Bryzgalov	13,023	15–11–1	31

December: 10–2–3 (Home: 8–0–1; Road: 2–2–2)
#	**Date**	**Visitor**	**Score**	**Home**	**OT**	**Decision**	**Attendance**	**Record**	**Pts**	**Recap**
28	December 3	Calgary Flames	1–2	Phoenix Coyotes		Bryzgalov	9,868	16–11–1	33
29	December 5	Ottawa Senators	2–3	Phoenix Coyotes		Bryzgalov	8,642	17–11–1	35
30	December 7	Minnesota Wild	0–2	Phoenix Coyotes		Bryzgalov	8,981	18–11–1	37
31	December 10	Phoenix Coyotes	2–3	Los Angeles Kings	SO	Bryzgalov	15,259	18–11–2	38
32	December 12	San Jose Sharks	1–2	Phoenix Coyotes		Bryzgalov	10,650	19–11–2	40
33	December 14	Phoenix Coyotes	2–3	Detroit Red Wings		Bryzgalov	18,795	19–12–2	40
34	December 16	Phoenix Coyotes	6–3	Toronto Maple Leafs		Bryzgalov	19,088	20–12–2	42
35	December 17	Phoenix Coyotes	2–1	Columbus Blue Jackets	SO	LaBarbera	13,363	21–12–2	44
36	December 19	Phoenix Coyotes	2–4	Anaheim Ducks		Bryzgalov	15,107	21–13–2	44
37	December 21	Columbus Blue Jackets	2–5	Phoenix Coyotes		Bryzgalov	9,348	22–13–2	46
38	December 23	Anaheim Ducks	0–4	Phoenix Coyotes		Bryzgalov	10,030	23–13–2	48
39	December 26	Los Angeles Kings	2–3	Phoenix Coyotes		Bryzgalov	16,131	24–13–2	50
40	December 28	Phoenix Coyotes	2–3	San Jose Sharks	SO	Bryzgalov	17,562	24–13–3	51
41	December 29	Vancouver Canucks	2–3	Phoenix Coyotes	SO	LaBarbera	13,976	25–13–3	53
42	December 31	San Jose Sharks	3–2	Phoenix Coyotes	SO	Bryzgalov	12,472	25–13–4	54

January: 8–5–1 (Home: 5–3–1; Road: 3–2–0)
#	**Date**	**Visitor**	**Score**	**Home**	**OT**	**Decision**	**Attendance**	**Record**	**Pts**	**Recap**
43	January 2	Detroit Red Wings	4–1	Phoenix Coyotes		Bryzgalov	17,125	25–14–4	54
44	January 5	Phoenix Coyotes	5–4	Edmonton Oilers	OT	Bryzgalov	16,839	26–14–4	56
45	January 7	Phoenix Coyotes	0–4	Vancouver Canucks		Bryzgalov	18,810	26–15–4	56
46	January 9	New York Islanders	5–4	Phoenix Coyotes	SO	LaBarbera	11,454	26–15–5	57
47	January 12	San Jose Sharks	3–1	Phoenix Coyotes		LaBarbera	9,248	26–16–5	57
48	January 14	New Jersey Devils	3–4	Phoenix Coyotes		Bryzgalov	9,430	27–16–5	59
49	January 16	Minnesota Wild	4–6	Phoenix Coyotes		Bryzgalov	12,631	28–16–5	61
50	January 18	Buffalo Sabres	7–2	Phoenix Coyotes		Bryzgalov	11,309	28–17–5	61
51	January 21	Nashville Predators	2–4	Phoenix Coyotes		Bryzgalov	9,142	29–17–5	63
52	January 23	Phoenix Coyotes	2–4	Washington Capitals		Bryzgalov	18,277	29–18–5	63
53	January 26	Phoenix Coyotes	5–4	Detroit Red Wings	OT	Bryzgalov	19,843	30–18–5	65
54	January 28	Calgary Flames	2–3	Phoenix Coyotes	SO	Bryzgalov	12,725	31–18–5	67
55	January 30	New York Rangers	2–3	Phoenix Coyotes		LaBarbera	16,687	32–18–5	69
56	January 31	Phoenix Coyotes	4–2	Dallas Stars		Bryzgalov	16,498	33–18–5	71

February: 4–3–0 (Home: 1–1–0; Road: 3–2–0)
#	**Date**	**Visitor**	**Score**	**Home**	**OT**	**Decision**	**Attendance**	**Record**	**Pts**	**Recap**
57	February 2	Phoenix Coyotes	1–0	Nashville Predators	SO	Bryzgalov	14,196	34–18–5	73
58	February 5	Phoenix Coyotes	2–1	Chicago Blackhawks	SO	LaBarbera	22,169	35–18–5	75
59	February 6	Phoenix Coyotes	0–4	Dallas Stars		Bryzgalov	18,532	35–19–5	75
60	February 8	Edmonton Oilers	1–6	Phoenix Coyotes		Bryzgalov	13,421	36–19–5	77
61	February 10	Phoenix Coyotes	3–2	Minnesota Wild		Bryzgalov	18,178	37–19–5	79
62	February 12	Phoenix Coyotes	1–2	Colorado Avalanche		Bryzgalov	14,129	37–20–5	79
63	February 13	Dallas Stars	3–0	Phoenix Coyotes		Bryzgalov	16,734	37–21–5	79

March: 10–4–1 (Home: 5–1–0; Road: 5–3–1)
#	**Date**	**Visitor**	**Score**	**Home**	**OT**	**Decision**	**Attendance**	**Record**	**Pts**	**Recap**
64	March 2	St. Louis Blues	5–2	Phoenix Coyotes		Bryzgalov	10,385	37–22–5	79
65	March 4	Colorado Avalanche	1–3	Phoenix Coyotes		Bryzgalov	12,426	38–22–5	81
66	March 6	Anaheim Ducks	0–4	Phoenix Coyotes		Bryzgalov	14,965	39–22–5	83
67	March 10	Vancouver Canucks	3–4	Phoenix Coyotes	SO	Bryzgalov	15,883	40–22–5	85
68	March 13	Phoenix Coyotes	4–0	Carolina Hurricanes		Bryzgalov	17,690	41–22–5	87
69	March 14	Phoenix Coyotes	3–2	Atlanta Thrashers	SO	LaBarbera	15,914	42–22–5	89
70	March 16	Phoenix Coyotes	2–1	Tampa Bay Lightning		Bryzgalov	14,517	43–22–5	91
71	March 18	Phoenix Coyotes	4–3	Florida Panthers	SO	Bryzgalov	12,282	44–22–5	93
72	March 20	Chicago Blackhawks	4–5	Phoenix Coyotes	SO	Bryzgalov	17,534	45–22–5	95
73	March 21	Phoenix Coyotes	3–2	Dallas Stars	SO	LaBarbera	16,114	46–22–5	97
74	March 23	Phoenix Coyotes	0–2	Chicago Blackhawks		Bryzgalov	22,077	46–23–5	97
75	March 25	Phoenix Coyotes	3–4	Nashville Predators	SO	Bryzaglov	15,970	46–23–6	98
76	March 27	Colorado Avalanche	2–6	Phoenix Coyotes		Bryzgalov	17,188	47–23–6	100
77	March 30	Phoenix Coyotes	1–4	Vancouver Canucks		Bryzgalov	18,810	47–24–6	100
78	March 31	Phoenix Coyotes	1–2	Calgary Flames		LaBarbera	19,289	47–25–6	100

April: 3–0–1 (Home: 2–0–0; Road: 1–0–1)
#	**Date**	**Visitor**	**Score**	**Home**	**OT**	**Decision**	**Attendance**	**Record**	**Pts**	**Recap**
79	April 3	Edmonton Oilers	2–3	Phoenix Coyotes	SO	Bryzgalov	17,143	48–25–6	102
80	April 7	Nashville Predators	2–5	Phoenix Coyotes		Bryzgalov	17,136	49–25–6	104
81	April 8	Phoenix Coyotes	3–2	Los Angeles Kings	SO	LaBarbera	18,118	50–25–6	106
82	April 10	Phoenix Coyotes	2–3	San Jose Sharks	SO	Bryzgalov	17,562	50–25–7	107

**Legend**: Win (2 points) Loss (0 points) Overtime/shootout loss (1 point)

Source
Phoenix Coyotes.

== Playoffs ==
On March 27, 2010, the Coyotes clinched a playoff spot, their first playoff spot since the 2001–02 season, and in the process, reached the 100-point mark for the first time in franchise history. Their first-round opponent in the Stanley Cup playoffs was the Detroit Red Wings. As the fourth seed in the West, the Coyotes had home ice advantage in a playoff series for the first time since 1998-1999, when they lost to the St. Louis Blues in seven games.

=== Coyotes vs. Red Wings ===
The teams split their season series this year, with both Coyote victories coming in overtime, including a 5–4 road victory on January 26 in Detroit. The Coyotes were down 4–2 with less than two minutes to play in regulation and scored two goals with an extra attacker, one by defenseman Keith Yandle via a one-timer from the point which he didn't get much wood on and the second by defenseman Ed Jovanovski, who took a pass from captain Shane Doan from behind the net and going five-hole on Jimmy Howard. In overtime, Doan eventually scored the winning goal after taking a kick-pass from center Matthew Lombardi and taking his time to put the puck past Howard and giving the Coyotes an improbable 5–4 come-from-behind victory and setting the tone for the rest of Phoenix's season.

The Coyotes organization has planned their playoff tradition of a WhiteOut, which dates back to the franchise's days in Winnipeg. The last WhiteOut that the organization attempted was early in the season, a 2–0 loss to the visiting Columbus Blue Jackets on October 10.

On April 12, an article on Yahoo! Sports surfaced revealing that the Coyotes must counter the Red Wings tradition of throwing octopus onto the ice by having Phoenix fans throw rubber or plastic snakes onto the surface. The article's source was a Coyotes blog entitled "Five For Howling," authored by longtime fan Travis Hair. The movement gained wide popularity by way of Twitter with the hashtag of #throwthesnake. However, when Hair informed the organization of the idea, the front office rejected the plan, citing league rules of delay of game penalties and arena rules of nothing entering the playing area.

Many experts picked the Red Wings to win the series because of their torrid pace of play since the Olympic break and the play of rookie goaltender and Calder Memorial Trophy candidate Jimmy Howard. However, there are members of the media who favored the Coyotes in the series, citing their home-ice advantage and regular season home record, Tippett's coaching, the play of Vezina Trophy and Hart Memorial Trophy candidate Ilya Bryzgalov, and the additions of wingers Wojtek Wolski and Lee Stempniak, who have provided an offensive punch to a team built on defense.

The series has also been selected by many analysts to be the most intriguing out of all the first-round series due to the contrast in styles of Detroit's high-octane offense and Phoenix's suffocating defense. The experience of Detroit's squad matched up with the veteran, but playoff-inexperienced Phoenix club also plays a factor.

On April 14, the Coyotes won the first game of the best-of-seven series by a score of 3–2. Tomas Holmstrom and Nicklas Lidstrom scored for the Red Wings while Phoenix's three goals came via the power play, which was a rare occurrence for a team that had been struggling with the man-advantage all season. Defenseman Keith Yandle scored the first goal, trade deadline acquisition Wojtek Wolski tallied one early in the second, and defenseman Derek Morris fired home the eventual game winner in the third.

Two days later, on April 16, the Red Wings evened up the series at 1–1 behind a strong game from Henrik Zetterberg who recorded a hat trick to propel Detroit to a 7–4 win. The Coyotes struck first off a tip-in from Keith Yandle but the Wings got back into it. The second period was an eventful one, with the teams combining for five goals in a span of 3:58. However, Detroit added four goals in the third period, including the eventual game winner by Zetterberg, to take home the win.

In Detroit for the third game, the Coyotes responded from their disappointing second game by scoring first. With just 29 seconds elapsed in the first period, defenseman Sami Lepisto followed up a rebound given up by Jimmy Howard off a shot Petr Prucha and fired it into the net. Early in the second period, the Phoenix captain and on ice inspiration, Shane Doan was injured after tripping over Jimmy Howard in the goal crease and crashing heavily into the boards. It would later be revealed that Doan suffered a grade 3 shoulder separation, and he would not play the rest of the series. The Red Wings would tie the game up at 1 off a shot by Valtteri Filppula that snuck past Ilya Bryzgalov on the short side and crossed the goal line just enough. Later, with less than a minute in the second period, Wojtek Wolski broke the tie, punching a rebound in off a shot by Matthew Lombardi to give the Coyotes a 2–1 lead heading into the third. In the third period, Prucha scored for Phoenix off a pass from Radim Vrbata. Vrbata took a pass from Prucha off the boards and then fed a pass to Prucha between two defenders, and then tucked it past Howard. The Wings would get back into it however off of a goal by Johan Franzen that also snuck past Bryzgalov's short side, making the game 3–2. Later in the third, Vrbata would propel the puck past Howard from the left faceoff circle, giving the Coyotes a 4–2 lead, which would be the final score.

In the fourth game, on April 20, the game was scoreless until Henrik Zetterberg scored on the power play by deflecting a shot from Niklas Kronwall, upwards into the net. Pavel Datsyuk scored 15:53 minutes in on a one-timer from Johan Franzen (with captain Nicklas Lidstrom getting an assist as well). Henrik Zetterberg had the final goal of the game at 16:18 minutes played in the third, with assists from Todd Bertuzzi and Brad Stuart. Jimmy Howard was the first star of the game, producing 29 saves and a shutout.

Headed back to Phoenix for the fifth game on April 23, the coyotes were 0 for 14 on the power play after going 3 for 3 in game one. The Phoenix power play would be held scoreless once again, going 0 for 5. The scoring started for Detroit when Drew Miller scored a wrap around goal on Ilya Bryzgalov at 17:04 of the first period. Ed Jovanovski would tie the score 1–1 at 9:45 in the second period when an Adrian Aucoin shot from the point bounced off of Jimmy Howard's right pad and lay just outside the crease when Jovanowski spun around and slipped the puck in short side. The game remained tied until 11:09 of the third when a Nicklas Lidstrom shot from the point hit Tomas Holmstrom in front of the net while he was skating through the crease behind Bryzgalov, the puck got tangled up in Holmstrom's equipment until he stopped in the crease, behind Bryzgalov and the puck fell to the ice. Holmstrom shot the puck into the empty net as no one but Holmstrom could locate the puck. 70 seconds later, Pavel Datsyuk scored another goal on the backhand at 12:19 and Henrik Zetterberg added an empty net goal at 19:04.

On April 25, in game six in Detroit, Phoenix's power play had gone 0 for 19 after an amazing start in game one. The game didn't start out well for Phoenix when they took three penalties in the first 5 minutes of the game, but Bryzgalov came up huge on the penalty kill, blanking the Red Wings on three chances including a short 5 on 3 power play and then Lauri Korpikoski scored a shorthanded goal at 4:10 of the first period and momentum in hand, Phoenix never looked back. Phoenix took over in the second period when Mathieu Schneider scored a power play goal, Radim Vrbata added another power play goal and Wojtek Wolski tipped in an even strength goal. Taylor Pyatt added another power play goal in the third Brad Stuart and Darren Helm scored for Detroit.

After an impressive 5–2 game 6 win where Phoenix excelled on the penalty kill and the power play and controlled much of the play, people were expecting more of the same from Phoenix in game seven at home. However it was just the opposite. Detroit came out and controlled the play from the puck drop, outshooting Phoenix 17–6 in the first period and 50–33 in the game. Thanks to an impressive display by Ilya Bryzgalov the score remained tied 0–0 at the end of the first. But Detroit would not let up, they continued dominating in the second and finally perforated Bryzgalov at 2:01 of the second on the power play when a scramble in front of the net let loose a puck in the slot that Pavel Datsyuk shot in between Bryzgalov's legs. 1:41 seconds later, Datsyuk would score again on a breakaway that Henrik Zetterberg helped set up with a precise pass through the neutral zone during a four-on-four sequence. Vernon Fiddler would cut the Detroit lead in half when he shot a puck instantly off the face off that caught Jimmy Howard by surprise, but Detroit's Nicklas Lidstrom restored the two-goal lead when he scored a power play goal with a slap shot. The back-breaking point for the Coyotes came at the end of the second period when Phoenix was rewarded with a 1:12 5 on 3 power play with the score 3–1. Detroit killed off the disadvantage masterfully with defenseman Nicklas Kronwall blocking multiple shots and Jimmy Howard making timely saves, at the end of the disadvantage they Coyotes defenseman Keith Yandle missed a Lee Stempniak pass back to the point which bounced off the boards into the neutral zone just as Detroit player, Brad Stuart was coming out of the penalty box, Stuart picked up the puck and scored on the break away, roofing the puck over Bryzgalov's right shoulder. Yandle clearly showed signs of frustration and a general lack of class when he intentionally tripped Henrik Zetterberg as he was skating behind the net to celebrate the goal with Stuart, sending Zetterberg crashing heavily into the end boards, Zetterberg was not injured on the play and Yandle escaped punishment. Todd Bertuzzi would add another goal in the third, scoring on the rebound of a Valtteri Filppula shot and Lidstrom added another power play goal when he scored on a wrist shot from the circle. At the end of the game, after the handshake line the Phoenix fans gave the team a standing ovation and the players saluted the fans by raising their sticks at center ice, a tradition that almost all NHL teams participate in.

Key: Win Loss

2010 Stanley Cup Playoffs

Western Conference Quarter-finals: vs. (5) Detroit Red Wings – Detroit wins series 4–3
#	Date	Visitor	Score	Home	OT	Decision	Attendance	Series	Recap
1	April 14	Detroit Red Wings	2–3	Phoenix Coyotes		Bryzgalov	17,125	Coyotes lead 1–0
2	April 16	Detroit Red Wings	7–4	Phoenix Coyotes		Bryzgalov	17,386	Series tied 1–1
3	April 18	Phoenix Coyotes	4–2	Detroit Red Wings		Bryzgalov	20,066	Coyotes lead 2–1
4	April 20	Phoenix Coyotes	0–3	Detroit Red Wings		Bryzgalov	20,066	Series tied 2–2
5	April 23	Detroit Red Wings	4–1	Phoenix Coyotes		Bryzgalov	17,458	Red Wings lead 3–2
6	April 25	Phoenix Coyotes	5–2	Detroit Red Wings		Bryzgalov	20,066	Series tied 3–3
7	April 27	Detroit Red Wings	6–1	Phoenix Coyotes		Bryzgalov	17,543	Red Wings win series 4–3

== Player statistics ==
=== Skaters ===
Regular season

Player	GP	G	A	Pts	+/−	PIM
Shane Doan	82	18	37	55	3	41
Matthew Lombardi	78	19	34	53	8	36
Radim Vrbata	82	24	19	43	6	24
Keith Yandle	82	12	29	41	16	45
Ed Jovanovski	66	10	24	34	−12	55
Martin Hanzal	81	11	22	33	0	104
Scottie Upshall	49	18	14	32	5	50
Vernon Fiddler	76	8	22	30	13	46
Robert Lang	64	9	20	29	−4	28
Adrian Aucoin	82	8	20	28	2	56
Taylor Pyatt	74	12	11	23	13	39
Petr Prucha	79	13	9	22	−2	23
Daniel Winnik	74	4	15	19	1	12
Lee Stempniak^{†}	18	14	4	18	10	8
Wojtek Wolski^{†}	18	6	12	18	6	6
Zbynek Michalek	72	3	14	17	5	30
Peter Mueller^{‡}	54	4	13	17	−5	8
James Vandermeer	62	4	8	12	3	60
Lauri Korpikoski	71	5	6	11	−10	16
Sami Lepisto	66	1	10	11	14	60
David Schlemko	17	1	4	5	1	8
Paul Bissonnette	41	3	2	5	−2	117
Derek Morris^{†}	18	1	3	4	4	11
Mathieu Schneider^{†}	8	0	4	4	5	4
Mikkel Boedker	14	1	2	3	2	0
Anders Eriksson^{‡}	12	0	3	3	0	2
Shaun Heshka	8	0	2	2	0	4
Joel Perrault	2	1	0	1	−1	0
Petteri Nokelainen^{†}	12	0	1	1	−3	6
Kurt Sauer	1	0	0	0	1	0
Jeff Hoggan	4	0	0	0	−1	2
Kevin Porter^{‡}	4	0	0	0	1	0

Playoffs

Player	GP	G	A	Pts	+/−	PIM
Matthew Lombardi	7	1	5	6	2	2
Wojtek Wolski	7	4	1	5	1	0
Keith Yandle	7	2	3	5	−1	4
Derek Morris	7	1	3	4	−1	11
Radim Vrbata	7	2	2	4	−2	4
Petr Prucha	7	1	2	3	1	4
Martin Hanzal	7	0	3	3	−3	10
Adrian Aucoin	7	0	2	2	3	10
Shane Doan	3	1	1	2	0	4
Taylor Pyatt	7	1	1	2	−4	2
Vernon Fiddler	6	1	1	2	−4	14
Zbynek Michalek	7	0	2	2	−4	2
Lee Stempniak	7	0	2	2	−4	0
Mathieu Schneider	3	1	0	1	−1	0
Robert Lang	4	0	1	1	0	0
Ed Jovanovski	7	1	0	1	−7	4
Lauri Korpikoski	7	1	0	1	−4	2
Sami Lepisto	7	1	0	1	−1	6
Petteri Nokelainen	5	0	0	0	−1	2
Daniel Winnik	7	0	0	0	−2	0

=== Goaltenders ===
Regular season

Player	GP	Min	W	L	OTL	GA	GAA	SA	Sv%	SO	G	A	PIM
Ilya Bryzgalov	69	4084	42	20	6	156	2.29	1961	.920	8	0	1	4
Jason LaBarbera	17	928	8	5	1	33	2.13	459	.928	0	0	0	0

Playoffs

Player	GP	Min	W	L	GA	GAA	SA	Sv%	SO	G	A	PIM
Ilya Bryzgalov	7	419	3	4	24	3.44	255	.906	0	0	0	0

^{†}Denotes player spent time with another team before joining Coyotes. Stats reflect time with the Coyotes only.
^{‡}Traded mid-season.
Bold/italics denotes franchise record.

Note:

Pos = Position;GP = Games played; G = Goals; A = Assists; Pts = Points; PIM = Penalty minutes; +/- = Plus/minus; PPG = Power-play goals; SHG = Short-handed goals; GWG = Game-winning goals
Pos = Position;GP = Games played; Min, TOI = Minutes played; W = Wins; L = Losses; T,T/OT = Ties; OTL = Overtime losses; GA = Goals-against; GAA = Goals-against average; SO = Shutouts; SA = Shots against; SV = Shots saved;SV% = Save percentage;

== Awards ==
Regular season
Player	Award	Date
Ilya Bryzgalov	NHL First Star of the Week	October 19, 2009
Ilya Bryzgalov	NHL Third Star of the Month	October 2009
Ilya Bryzgalov	NHL Third Star of the Week	December 14, 2009
Ilya Bryzgalov	NHL Second Star of the Month	December 2009
Shane Doan	NHL First Star of the Week	February 1, 2010
Lee Stempniak	NHL Second Star of the Week	March 15, 2010
Lee Stempniak	NHL First Star of the Month	March 2010
Don Maloney	NHL general manager of the Year	2009–10 NHL season
Dave Tippett	Jack Adams Trophy winner	June 23, 2010
Shane Doan	King Clancy Trophy winner	June 23, 2010

== Transactions ==
The Coyotes have been involved in the following transactions during the 2009–10 season.

=== Trades ===
Date	Details
June 19, 2009	To Florida Panthers Steven Reinprecht	To Phoenix Coyotes Stefan Meyer
June 27, 2009	To Vancouver Canucks 7th-round pick (187th overall) in 2009	To Phoenix Coyotes Shaun Heshka
June 27, 2009	To Calgary Flames Brandon Prust	To Phoenix Coyotes Jim Vandermeer
June 27, 2009	To Washington Capitals 5th-round pick in 2010	To Phoenix Coyotes Sami Lepisto
June 27, 2009	To New York Islanders 3rd-round pick in 2010	To Phoenix Coyotes 3rd-round pick (91st overall) in 2009
July 13, 2009	To New York Rangers Enver Lisin	To Phoenix Coyotes Lauri Korpikoski
July 21, 2009	To Tampa Bay Lightning Todd Fedoruk; David Hale	To Phoenix Coyotes Radim Vrbata
March 3, 2010	To Boston Bruins Conditional 3rd-round pick in 2011 (Note: Condition satisfied.)	To Phoenix Coyotes Derek Morris
March 3, 2010	To Colorado Avalanche Peter Mueller; Kevin Porter	To Phoenix Coyotes Wojtek Wolski
March 3, 2010	To Vancouver Canucks Sean Zimmerman; Conditional 6th-round pick in 2010 (Note: Condition satisfied.)	To Phoenix Coyotes Mathieu Schneider
March 3, 2010	To Toronto Maple Leafs Matt Jones; 4th-round pick in 2010; 7th-round pick in 2010	To Phoenix Coyotes Lee Stempniak
March 3, 2010	To New York Rangers Anders Eriksson	To Phoenix Coyotes Miika Wiikman; 7th-round pick in 2011
March 3, 2010	To Columbus Blue Jackets Chad Kolarik	To Phoenix Coyotes Alexandre Picard
March 3, 2010	To Anaheim Ducks 6th-round pick in 2011	To Phoenix Coyotes Petteri Nokelainen

=== Free agents acquired ===
Player	Former team	Contract terms
Vernon Fiddler	Nashville Predators	2 years, $2.2 million
Jason LaBarbera	Vancouver Canucks	2 years, $2 million
Adrian Aucoin	Calgary Flames	1 year, $2.25 million
Taylor Pyatt	Vancouver Canucks	1 year
Ryan Hollweg	Toronto Maple Leafs	1 year
Robert Lang	Montreal Canadiens	1 year
Matt Watkins	University of North Dakota	entry-level contract
Anders Eriksson	Calgary Flames	undisclosed
Josh Lunden	University of Alaska Anchorage	entry-level contract

=== Free agents lost ===
Player	New team	Contract terms
Steven Goertzen	Carolina Hurricanes	1 year, $500,000 2-way contract
Brian McGrattan	Calgary Flames	1 year, $550,000
Garth Murray	Calgary Flames	undisclosed
Dmitri Kalinin	Salavat Yulaev Ufa	2 years

=== Claimed via waivers ===
Player	Former team	Date claimed off waivers
Paul Bissonnette	Pittsburgh Penguins	September 30, 2009

=== Lost via waivers ===
Player	New team	Date claimed off waivers
Nigel Dawes	Calgary Flames	July 16, 2009

=== Player signings ===
Player	Contract terms
Petr Prucha	2 years, $2.2 million
Stefan Meyer	1 year
Shaun Heshka	1 year
Lauri Korpikoski	2 years, $1.4 million
Keith Yandle	2 years, $2.4 million
David Spina	undisclosed
Jeff Hoggan	undisclosed
Sean Sullivan	undisclosed
Daniel Winnik	undisclosed
Scottie Upshall	1 year, $1.5 million
Josh Tordjman	1 year
Colin Long	entry-level contract
Paul Bissonnette	2-year contract extension
Chris Summers	entry-level contract
Mathieu Brodeur	entry-level contract

== Draft picks ==
Phoenix's picks at the 2009 NHL entry draft in Montreal, Quebec.

Round	#	Player	Position	Nationality	College/junior/club team (league)
1	6	Oliver Ekman-Larsson	(D)	Sweden	Leksands IF (HockeyAllsvenskan)
2	36	Chris Brown	(C)	United States	U.S. National Team Development Program (USHL)
3	91 (from Pittsburgh via NY Islanders)	Michael Lee	(G)	United States	Fargo Force (USHL)
4	97	Jordan Szwarz	(RW)	Canada	Saginaw Spirit (OHL)
4	105 (from Florida)	Justin Weller	(D)	Canada	Red Deer Rebels (WHL)
6	157	Evan Bloodoff	(LW)	Canada	Kelowna Rockets (WHL)

== See also ==
- 2009–10 NHL season

== Farm teams ==
San Antonio Rampage

The San Antonio Rampage are the Coyotes American Hockey League affiliate in 2009–10.

Arizona Sundogs

The Arizona Sundogs were the Coyotes affiliate in the CHL but are no longer affiliated.
