= 2009–10 Edmonton Oilers season =

NHL team season

2009–10 Edmonton Oilers
- Division: 5th Northwest
- Conference: 15th Western
- 2009–10 record: 27–47–8
- Home record: 18–19–4
- Road record: 9–28–4
- Goals for: 214
- Goals against: 284

Team information
- General manager: Steve Tambellini
- Coach: Pat Quinn
- Captain: Ethan Moreau
- Alternate captains: Ales Hemsky; Shawn Horcoff; Sheldon Souray; Steve Staios (Oct.–Mar.)
- Arena: Rexall Place
- Average attendance: 16,839 (100%)
- Minor league affiliates: Springfield Falcons (AHL); Stockton Thunder (ECHL)

Team leaders
- Goals: Dustin Penner (32)
- Assists: Dustin Penner (31)
- Points: Dustin Penner (63)
- Penalty minutes: Zack Stortini (155)
- Plus/minus: Ales Hemsky (+7); Ryan Whitney (+7)
- Wins: Jeff Deslauriers (16)
- Goals against average: Nikolai Khabibulin (3.03)

The 2009–10 Edmonton Oilers season was the team's 38th season of play, its 31st as a member of the National Hockey League (NHL). The 2009–10 season was one of the poorest in franchise history as the Oilers finished last in the NHL. The team's 62 points were the second-lowest point total in franchise history (the lowest point total was 60 points obtained back in 1992–93). However, despite the misery endured that season, the Oilers were compensated on April 13, 2010, when they won the 2010 NHL Draft Lottery to pick first overall for the first time in franchise history.

This season the Oilers missed the Stanley Cup playoffs for the fourth consecutive season for the first time since the 1992–93 season and the 1995–96 season having not appeared in a playoff game since Game 7 of the 2006 Stanley Cup Finals against the Carolina Hurricanes. This would continue until their 2016–17 season.

== Preseason ==
- On May 26, Pat Quinn was named as the new head coach of the Oilers, replacing Craig MacTavish. Tom Renney and Wayne Fleming were named associate coach and assistant coach, respectively.
- On June 30, Oilers general manager Steve Tambellini aggressively pursued disgruntled winger and sniper Dany Heatley, who wanted a trade from the Ottawa Senators. A deal was in place that would have sent Andrew Cogliano, Dustin Penner and Ladislav Smid to Ottawa. However, Heatley who had a no-movement clause rejected the trade. Tambellini would eventually give up pursuing Heatley, and he was eventually traded to the San Jose Sharks.
- On September 10, former Oiler Mike Comrie signed a one-year contract worth $1.125 million with the team that began his career. After a six-year hiatus, Comrie was finally able to mend the fences with the Oilers faithful. This was shown in a game against the Florida Panthers when Comrie dropped the gloves against Eric Himelfarb. After the fight, the fans showed appreciation by chanting his name. The Oilers won that game 4–0.

2009 Pre-season Game Log: 4–3–1 (Home: 3–1–0; Road: 1–1–0; Neutral: 0–1–1)
#	Date	Visitor	Score	Home	OT	Decision	Attendance	Record
1	September 15	Edmonton Oilers	4-1	Calgary Flames		Jeff Deslauriers (1-0-0)	19,289	1-0-0
2	September 16	New York Islanders	2-3	Edmonton Oilers		Devan Dubnyk (1-0-0)	16,386	2-0-0
3	September 18	Florida Panthers	0-4	Edmonton Oilers		Nikolai Khabibulin (1-0-0)	16,601	3-0-0
4	September 19	Edmonton Oilers	1-3	Vancouver Canucks		Jeff Deslauriers (1-1-0)	18,630	3-1-0
5	September 20 (in Saskatoon, SK)	Edmonton Oilers	1-3	New York Islanders		Devan Dubnyk (1-1-0)	12,843	3-2-0
6	September 23	Calgary Flames	5-3	Edmonton Oilers		Nikolai Khabibulin (1-1-0)	16,839	3-3-0
7	September 24 (in Winnipeg, MB)	Edmonton Oilers	3-4	Tampa Bay Lightning		Jeff Deslauriers (1-2-0)	11,644	3-3-1
8	September 27	Vancouver Canucks	4-5	Edmonton Oilers		Nikolai Khabibulin (2-1-0)	16,839	4-3-1

== Regular season ==
The Oilers allowed 278 goals (excluding 6 shootout goals), the most in the League.

=== Divisional standings ===
Northwest Division
		GP	W	L	OTL	GF	GA	Pts
**1**	**y – Vancouver Canucks**	**82**	**49**	**28**	**5**	**272**	**222**	**103**
**2**	**Colorado Avalanche**	**82**	**43**	**30**	**9**	**244**	**233**	**95**
3	Calgary Flames	82	40	32	10	204	210	90
4	Minnesota Wild	82	38	36	8	219	246	84
5	Edmonton Oilers	82	27	47	8	214	284	62

=== Conference standings ===
Western Conference
R		Div	GP	W	L	OTL	GF	GA	Pts
**1**	**z – San Jose Sharks**	**PA**	**82**	**51**	**20**	**11**	**264**	**215**	113
**2**	**y – Chicago Blackhawks**	**CE**	**82**	**52**	**22**	**8**	**271**	**209**	112
**3**	**y – Vancouver Canucks**	**NW**	**82**	**49**	**28**	**5**	**272**	**222**	103
**4**	**Phoenix Coyotes**	**PA**	**82**	**50**	**25**	**7**	**225**	**202**	107
**5**	**Detroit Red Wings**	**CE**	**82**	**44**	**24**	**14**	**229**	**216**	102
**6**	**Los Angeles Kings**	**PA**	**82**	**46**	**27**	**9**	**241**	**219**	101
**7**	**Nashville Predators**	**CE**	**82**	**47**	**29**	**6**	**225**	**225**	100
**8**	**Colorado Avalanche**	**NW**	**82**	**43**	**30**	**9**	**244**	**233**	95
8.5
9	Calgary Flames	NW	82	40	32	10	225	223	90
10	St. Louis Blues	CE	82	40	32	10	204	210	90
11	Anaheim Ducks	PA	82	39	32	11	238	251	89
12	Dallas Stars	PA	82	37	31	14	237	254	88
13	Minnesota Wild	NW	82	38	36	8	219	246	84
14	Columbus Blue Jackets	CE	82	32	35	15	216	259	79
15	Edmonton Oilers	NW	82	27	47	8	214	284	62

bold – Qualified for playoffs; y – Won division; z – Won conference (and division)

== Schedule and results ==
2009–10 Game Log

October: 7–6–1 (Home: 6–2–1; Road: 1–4–0)
#	Date	Visitor	Score	Home	OT	Decision	Attendance	Record	Pts	Recap
1	October 3	Calgary Flames	4 – 3	Edmonton Oilers		Khabibulin	16,839	0–1–0	0
2	October 6	Dallas Stars	4 – 5	Edmonton Oilers	SO	Khabibulin	16,839	1–1–0	2
3	October 8	Calgary Flames	4 – 3	Edmonton Oilers	SO	Khabibulin	16,839	1–1–1	3
4	October 10	Montreal Canadiens	2 – 3	Edmonton Oilers		Khabibulin	16,839	2–1–1	5
5	October 12	Edmonton Oilers	6 – 1	Nashville Predators		Deslauriers	12,179	3–1–1	7
6	October 14	Edmonton Oilers	3 – 4	Chicago Blackhawks		Khabibulin	20,124	3–2–1	7
7	October 16	Minnesota Wild	2 – 5	Edmonton Oilers		Khabibulin	16,839	4–2–1	9
8	October 19	Vancouver Canucks	1 – 2	Edmonton Oilers		Khabibulin	16,839	5–2–1	11
9	October 22	Columbus Blue Jackets	4 – 6	Edmonton Oilers		Khabibulin	16,839	6–2–1	13
10	October 24	Edmonton Oilers	2 – 5	Calgary Flames		Khabibulin	19,289	6–3–1	13
11	October 25	Edmonton Oilers	0 – 2	Vancouver Canucks		Deslauriers	18,810	6–4–1	13
12	October 27	Colorado Avalanche	3 – 0	Edmonton Oilers		Khabibulin	16,839	6–5–1	13
13	October 29	Detroit Red Wings	5 – 6	Edmonton Oilers	SO	Khabibulin	16,839	7–5–1	15
14	October 31	Edmonton Oilers	0 – 2	Boston Bruins		Khabibulin	17,565	7–6–1	15

November: 3–7–3 (Home: 2–3–1; Road: 1–4–2)
#	Date	Visitor	Score	Home	OT	Decision	Attendance	Record	Pts	Recap
15	November 2	Edmonton Oilers	1 – 3	New York Islanders		Khabibulin	10,846	7–7–1	15
16	November 5	New York Rangers	4 – 2	Edmonton Oilers		Khabibulin	16,839	7–8–1	15
17	November 8	Edmonton Oilers	5 – 3	Colorado Avalanche		Khabibulin	12,118	8–8–1	17
18	November 10	Edmonton Oilers	3 – 4	Ottawa Senators	SO	Deslauriers	17,977	8–8–2	18
19	November 11	Edmonton Oilers	1 – 3	Buffalo Sabres		Khabibulin	17,797	8–9–2	18
20	November 15	Edmonton Oilers	2 – 3	Atlanta Thrashers		Khabibulin	11,091	8–10–2	18
21	November 16	Edmonton Oilers	2 – 3	Columbus Blue Jackets	SO	Khabibulin	13,030	8–10–3	19
22	November 18	Colorado Avalanche	4 – 6	Edmonton Oilers		Deslauriers	16,839	9–10–3	21
23	November 21	Chicago Blackhawks	5 – 2	Edmonton Oilers		Deslauriers	16,839	9–11–3	21
24	November 23	Phoenix Coyotes	0 – 4	Edmonton Oilers		Deslauriers	16,839	10–11–3	23
25	November 25	Los Angeles Kings	3 – 1	Edmonton Oilers		Deslauriers	16,839	10–12–3	23
26	November 27	San Jose Sharks	5 – 4	Edmonton Oilers	SO	Deslauriers	16,839	10–12–4	24
27	November 28	Edmonton Oilers	3 – 7	Vancouver Canucks		Deslauriers	18,810	10–13–4	24

December: 6–8–0 (Home: 1–5–0; Road: 5–3–0)
#	Date	Visitor	Score	Home	OT	Decision	Attendance	Record	Pts	Recap
28	December 3	Edmonton Oilers	4 – 1	Detroit Red Wings		Deslauriers	18,018	11–13–4	26
29	December 5	Edmonton Oilers	3 – 2	Dallas Stars	SO	Deslauriers	15,860	12–13–4	28
30	December 7	Edmonton Oilers	3 – 2	Florida Panthers	SO	Deslauriers	11,469	13–13–4	30
31	December 9	Edmonton Oilers	3 – 2	Tampa Bay Lightning		Deslauriers	13,477	14–13–4	32
32	December 11	Edmonton Oilers	5 – 2	St. Louis Blues		Deslauriers	19,150	15–13–4	34
33	December 15	Los Angeles Kings	3 – 2	Edmonton Oilers		Deslauriers	16,839	15–14–4	34
34	December 17	Nashville Predators	6 – 3	Edmonton Oilers		Deslauriers	16,839	15–15–4	34
35	December 19	Washington Capitals	4 – 2	Edmonton Oilers		Deslauriers	16,839	15–16–4	34
36	December 21	St. Louis Blues	7 – 2	Edmonton Oilers		Dubnyk	16,839	15–17–4	34
37	December 23	Edmonton Oilers	1 – 3	Minnesota Wild		Deslauriers	18,250	15–18–4	34
38	December 26	Edmonton Oilers	1 – 4	Vancouver Canucks		Deslauriers	18,810	15–19–4	34
39	December 28	Calgary Flames	4 – 1	Edmonton Oilers		Deslauriers	16,839	15–20–4	34
40	December 30	Toronto Maple Leafs	1 – 3	Edmonton Oilers		Deslauriers	16,839	16–20–4	36
41	December 31	Edmonton Oilers	1 – 2	Calgary Flames		Deslauriers	19,289	16–21–4	36

January: 0–10–2 (Home: 0–6–2; Road: 0–4–0)
#	Date	Visitor	Score	Home	OT	Decision	Attendance	Record	Pts	Recap
42	January 2	Edmonton Oilers	1 – 4	San Jose Sharks		Deslauriers	17,562	16–22–4	36
43	January 5	Phoenix Coyotes	5 – 4	Edmonton Oilers	OT	Deslauriers	16,839	16–22–5	37
44	January 7	Columbus Blue Jackets	4 – 2	Edmonton Oilers		Dubnyk	16,839	16–23–5	37
45	January 12	Nashville Predators	5 – 3	Edmonton Oilers		Deslauriers	16,839	16–24–5	37
46	January 14	Pittsburgh Penguins	3 – 2	Edmonton Oilers		Dubnyk	16,839	16–25–5	37
47	January 16	Edmonton Oilers	2 – 4	San Jose Sharks		Dubnyk	17,562	16–26–5	37
48	January 18	Edmonton Oilers	0 – 6	Colorado Avalanche		Deslauriers	11,232	16–27–5	37
49	January 20	Vancouver Canucks	3 – 2	Edmonton Oilers	OT	Dubnyk	16,839	16–27–6	38
50	January 22	Dallas Stars	4 – 3	Edmonton Oilers		Dubnyk	16,839	16–28–6	38
51	January 26	Chicago Blackhawks	4 – 2	Edmonton Oilers		Deslauriers	16,839	16–29–6	38
52	January 28	St. Louis Blues	2 – 1	Edmonton Oilers		Deslauriers	16,839	16–30–6	38
53	January 30	Edmonton Oilers	1 – 6	Calgary Flames		Dubnyk	19,289	16–31–6	38

February: 3–5–0 (Home: 2–1–0; Road: 1–4–0)
#	Date	Visitor	Score	Home	OT	Decision	Attendance	Record	Pts	Recap
54	February 1	Carolina Hurricanes	2 – 4	Edmonton Oilers		Deslauriers	16,839	17–31–6	40
55	February 3	Philadelphia Flyers	0 – 1	Edmonton Oilers		Deslauriers	16,839	18–31–6	42
56	February 4	Edmonton Oilers	2 – 4	Minnesota Wild		Deslauriers	18,168	18–32–6	42
57	February 6	Edmonton Oilers	0 – 3	Colorado Avalanche		Deslauriers	16,571	18–33–6	42
58	February 8	Edmonton Oilers	1 – 6	Phoenix Coyotes		Deslauriers	13,421	18–34–6	42
59	February 10	Edmonton Oilers	2 – 3	Anaheim Ducks		Deslauriers	14,766	18–35–6	42
60	February 11	Edmonton Oilers	3 – 2	Los Angeles Kings	SO	Deslauriers	18,118	19–35–6	44
61	February 14	Anaheim Ducks	7 – 3	Edmonton Oilers		Deslauriers	16,839	19–36–6	44

March: 5–9–1 (Home: 5–2–0; Road: 0–7–1)
#	Date	Visitor	Score	Home	OT	Decision	Attendance	Record	Pts	Recap
62	March 2	Edmonton Oilers	3 – 4	Nashville Predators		Deslauriers	15,682	19–37–6	44
63	March 3	Edmonton Oilers	2 – 5	Chicago Blackhawks		Dubnyk	22,204	19–38–6	44
64	March 5	Minnesota Wild	1 – 2	Edmonton Oilers	SO	Deslauriers	16,839	20–38–6	46
65	March 7	New Jersey Devils	0 – 2	Edmonton Oilers		Deslauriers	16,839	21–38–6	48
66	March 9	Ottawa Senators	4 – 1	Edmonton Oilers		Deslauriers	16,839	21–39–6	48
67	March 11	Edmonton Oilers	4 – 5	Montreal Canadiens	SO	Dubnyk	21,273	21–39–7	49
68	March 13	Edmonton Oilers	4 – 6	Toronto Maple Leafs		Deslauriers	19,246	21–40–7	49
69	March 15	Edmonton Oilers	3 – 5	Columbus Blue Jackets		Dubnyk	13,603	21–41–7	49
70	March 16	Edmonton Oilers	2 – 4	Minnesota Wild		Deslauriers	18,474	21–42–7	49
71	March 19	Detroit Red Wings	2 – 3	Edmonton Oilers	SO	Dubnyk	16,839	22–42–7	51
72	March 21	San Jose Sharks	1 – 5	Edmonton Oilers		Dubnyk	16,839	23–42–7	53
73	March 23	Vancouver Canucks	2 – 3	Edmonton Oilers		Deslauriers	16,839	24–42–7	55
74	March 26	Anaheim Ducks	3 – 2	Edmonton Oilers		Deslauriers	16,839	24–43–7	55
75	March 28	Edmonton Oilers	1 – 2	St. Louis Blues		Dubnyk	19,150	24–44–7	55
76	March 30	Edmonton Oilers	4 – 5	Detroit Red Wings		Deslauriers	19,343	24–45–7	55

April: 3–2–1 (Home: 2–0–0; Road: 1–2–1)
#	Date	Visitor	Score	Home	OT	Decision	Attendance	Record	Pts	Recap
77	April 2	Edmonton Oilers	3 – 6	Dallas Stars		Dubnyk	17,626	24–46–7	55
78	April 3	Edmonton Oilers	2 – 3	Phoenix Coyotes	SO	Deslauriers	17,143	24–46–8	56
79	April 5	Minnesota Wild	1 – 4	Edmonton Oilers		Dubnyk	16,839	25–46–8	58
80	April 7	Colorado Avalanche	4 – 5	Edmonton Oilers	OT	Deslauriers	16,839	26–46–8	60
81	April 10	Edmonton Oilers	4 – 3	Los Angeles Kings	SO	Dubnyk	18,118	27–46–8	62
82	April 11	Edmonton Oilers	2 – 7	Anaheim Ducks		Deslauriers	16,392	27–47–8	62

Legend: Win (2 points) Loss (0 points) Overtime/shootout loss (1 point)

Schedule

== Player statistics ==
=== Skaters ===
Note: Pos = Position; GP = Games played; G = Goals; A = Assists; Pts = Points; PIM = Penalty minutes; +/- = Plus/minus; PPG = Power-play goals; SHG = Short-handed goals; GWG = Game-winning goals

Regular season

Player	GP	G	A	Pts	+/−	PIM
Dustin Penner	82	32	31	63	6	38
Sam Gagner	68	15	26	41	-8	33
Gilbert Brule	65	17	20	37	-8	38
Shawn Horcoff	77	13	23	36	-29	51
Patrick O'Sullivan	73	11	23	34	-35	32
Ryan Potulny	64	15	17	32	-21	28
Lubomir Visnovsky^{‡}	57	10	22	32	-4	16
Tom Gilbert	82	5	26	31	-10	16
Andrew Cogliano	82	10	18	28	-5	31
Robert Nilsson	60	11	16	27	-17	12
Ales Hemsky	22	7	15	22	7	8
Mike Comrie	43	13	8	21	-9	30
Denis Grebeshkov^{‡}	47	6	13	19	-16	26
Ethan Moreau	76	9	9	18	-18	62
Marc-Antoine Pouliot	35	7	7	14	-4	21
Sheldon Souray	37	4	9	13	-19	65
Zack Stortini	77	4	9	13	3	155
Jean-Francois Jacques	49	4	7	11	-15	78
Ryan Whitney^{†}	19	3	8	11	7	22
Ladislav Smid	51	1	8	9	5	39
Fernando Pisani	40	4	4	8	-16	10
Steve Staios^{‡}	40	0	7	7	-19	59
Aaron Johnson^{†}	19	3	4	7	-6	16
Ryan Stone	27	0	6	6	2	48
Jason Strudwick	72	0	6	6	-18	50
Taylor Chorney	42	0	3	3	-21	12
Liam Reddox	9	0	2	2	-2	4
Chris Minard	5	0	1	1	-3	0
Colin McDonald	2	1	0	1	1	0
Ryan O'Marra	3	0	1	1	0	0
Alex Plante	4	0	1	1	1	2
Theo Peckham	15	0	1	1	-8	43
Ryan Jones^{†}	8	1	0	1	-3	8
Johan Motin	1	0	0	0	-1	0
Dean Arsene	13	0	0	0	-3	41
Charles Linglet	5	0	0	0	-5	2
Steve MacIntyre^{‡}	4	0	0	0	0	7

=== Goaltenders ===
Note: Pos = Position;GP = Games played; Min, TOI = Minutes played; W = Wins; L = Losses; T,T/OT = Ties; OTL = Overtime losses; GA = Goals-against; GAA = Goals-against average; SO = Shutouts; SA = Shots against; SV = Shots saved; SV% = Save percentage;

Regular season

Player	GP	TOI	W	L	OT	GA	GAA	SA	Sv%	SO	G	A	PIM
Jeff Deslauriers	48	2798	16	28	4	152	3.26	1529	.901	3	0	3	8
Nikolai Khabibulin	18	1089	7	9	2	55	3.03	602	.909	0	0	0	4
Devan Dubnyk	19	1075	4	10	2	64	3.57	579	.889	0	0	0	0

^{†}Denotes player spent time with another team before joining Oilers. Stats reflect time with Oilers only.
^{‡}Traded mid-season. Stats reflect time with Oilers only.

== Awards and records ==
=== Records ===
- 7 seconds: A new Oilers record for fastest two goals in a game by Sheldon Souray (11:07) and Ales Hemsky (11:14) on November 23, 2009.

=== Milestones ===
Regular Season
Player	Milestone	Reached
Nikolai Khabibulin	300th NHL Win	October 6, 2009
Ales Hemsky	200th NHL PIM	October 10, 2009
Taylor Chorney	1st NHL Assist; 1st NHL Point	October 12, 2009
Jean-Francois Jacques	1st NHL Assist	October 12, 2009
Zack Stortini	500th NHL PIM	October 12, 2009
Mike Comrie	400th NHL PIM	October 19, 2009
Sam Gagner	100th NHL Point	October 24, 2009
Robert Nilsson	200th NHL Game	October 29, 2009
Ethan Moreau	800th NHL Game	October 31, 2009
Ryan O'Marra	1st NHL Game	November 10, 2009
Dean Arsene	1st NHL Game	November 16, 2009
Jeff Deslauriers	1st NHL Shutout	November 23, 2009
Tom Gilbert	200th NHL Game	November 23, 2009
Ales Hemsky	100th NHL Goal	November 23, 2009
Colin McDonald	1st NHL Game	November 27, 2009
Devan Dubnyk	1st NHL Game	November 28, 2009
Colin McDonald	1st NHL Goal; 1st NHL Point	November 28, 2009
Ryan O'Marra	1st NHL Assist; 1st NHL Point	November 28, 2009
Zack Stortini	1st NHL Gordie Howe hat trick	December 9, 2009
Robert Nilsson	100th NHL Point	December 11, 2009
Jean-Francois Jacques	100th NHL PIM	December 15, 2009
Andrew Cogliano	200th NHL Game	December 21, 2009
Sheldon Souray	1,000th NHL PIM	December 21, 2009
Denis Grebeshkov	200th NHL Game	December 23, 2009
Dustin Penner	300th NHL Game	December 28, 2009
Steve Staios	1,200th NHL PIM	December 28, 2009
Shawn Horcoff	600th NHL Game	January 7, 2010
Patrick O'Sullivan	100th NHL PIM	January 7, 2010
Sam Gagner	200th NHL Game	January 14, 2010
Sam Gagner	100th NHL PIM	January 16, 2010
Denis Grebeshkov	100th NHL PIM	January 20, 2010
Jean-Francois Jacques	100th NHL Game	January 22, 2010
Jason Strudwick	600th NHL Game	January 26, 2010
Gilbert Brule	200th NHL Game	January 30, 2010
Shawn Horcoff	400th NHL PIM	February 1, 2010
Alex Plante	1st NHL Game; 1st NHL Assist; 1st NHL Point	February 1, 2010
Dustin Penner	200th NHL PIM	February 3, 2010
Zack Stortini	200th NHL Game	February 3, 2010
Lubomir Visnovsky	600th NHL Game	February 4, 2010
Theo Peckham	1st NHL Assist; 1st NHL Point	March 2, 2010
Johan Motin	1st NHL Game	March 3, 2010
Zack Stortini	600th NHL PIM	March 5, 2010
Ryan Potulny	100th NHL Game	March 7, 2010
Andrew Cogliano	100th NHL Point	March 13, 2010
Gilbert Brule; Theo Peckham	100th NHL PIM	March 15, 2010
Devan Dubnyk	1st NHL Win	March 19, 2010
Tom Gilbert	100th NHL Point	March 21, 2010
Dustin Penner	100th NHL Goal	March 21, 2010
Ryan Whitney	300th NHL PIM	March 26, 2010
Charles Linglet	1st NHL Game	April 2, 2010
Fernando Pisani	400th NHL Game	April 7, 2010

== Transactions ==
The Oilers have been involved in the following transactions during the 2009–10 season.

=== Trades ===
Date	Details
June 27, 2009	To Minnesota Wild Kyle Brodziak; 6th-round pick in 2009	To Edmonton Oilers 4th-round pick in 2009; 5th-round pick in 2009
June 27, 2009	To Ottawa Senators 7th-round pick in 2009	To Edmonton Oilers 6th-round pick in 2010
July 9, 2009	To New Jersey Devils Tim Sestito	To Edmonton Oilers Future considerations
March 1, 2010	To Nashville Predators Denis Grebeshkov	To Edmonton Oilers 2nd-round pick in 2010
March 2, 2010	To Boston Bruins Cody Wild	To Edmonton Oilers Matt Marquardt
March 3, 2010	To Anaheim Ducks Lubomir Visnovsky	To Edmonton Oilers Ryan Whitney; 6th-round pick in 2010
March 3, 2010	To Calgary Flames Steve Staios	To Edmonton Oilers Aaron Johnson; 3rd-round pick in 2011

=== Free agents acquired ===
Date	Player	Former team	Term
July 1, 2009	Nikolai Khabibulin	Chicago Blackhawks	4 years, $15 million
July 10, 2009	Matt Nickerson	Ilves (Liiga)	undisclosed
July 13, 2009	Chris Minard	Pittsburgh Penguins	1 year, $550,000
July 16, 2009	Dean Arsene	Hershey Bears (AHL)	1 year, $500,000
September 10, 2009	Mike Comrie	Ottawa Senators	1 year, $1.125 million
March 31, 2010	Charles Linglet	Springfield Falcons (AHL)	

=== Free agents lost ===
Date	Player	New team	Term
July 1, 2009	Dwayne Roloson	New York Islanders	2 years, $5 million
July 7, 2009	Dany Sabourin	Boston Bruins	1 year, $600,000
July 9, 2009	Ales Kotalik	New York Rangers	3 years, $9 million
July 14, 2009	Mathieu Roy	Columbus Blue Jackets	1 year, $525,000
July 23, 2009	Bryan Young	Springfield Falcons (AHL)	
September 2, 2009	Sébastien Bisaillon	Kassel Huskies (DEL)	
October 3, 2009	David Rohlfs	Muskegon Lumberjacks (IHL)	
October 9, 2009	Tyler Spurgeon	Idaho Steelheads (ECHL)	
October 17, 2009	Glenn Fisher	Victoria Salmon Kings (ECHL)	
January 26, 2010	Carl Corazzini	ERC Ingolstadt (DEL)	

=== Claimed via waivers ===
Player	Former team	Date claimed off waivers
Ryan Jones	Nashville Predators	March 3, 2010

=== Lost via waivers ===
Player	New team	Date claimed off waivers
Rob Schremp	New York Islanders	September 29, 2009
Steve MacIntyre	Florida Panthers	November 10, 2009

=== Player signings ===
Player	Contract terms
Johan Motin	3 years, $1.912 million
Alex Plante	3 years, $2.625 million
Milan Kytnar	3 years, $1.7 million
Jason Strudwick	1 year, $700,000
Devan Dubnyk	1 year, $700,000
Toni Rajala	3 years, 1.9125 million
Denis Grebeshkov	1 year, $3.15 million
Liam Reddox	1 year, $515,000
Ryan Potulny	1 year, $595,000
Ladislav Smid	2 years, $2.7 million
Gilbert Brule	1 year, $800,000
Ryan Stone	1 year, $600,000
Rob Schremp	1 year, $715,000
Jeff Petry	2 years, $1.7 million
Charles Linglet	1 year, $500,000
Linus Omark	2 years, $1.75 million
Chris VandeVelde	2 years, $1.49 million

== Draft picks ==
Edmonton's picks at the 2009 NHL entry draft in Montreal, Quebec.

Round	#	Player	Position	Nationality	College/Junior/Club team (League)
1	10	Magnus Paajarvi-Svensson	(LW)	Sweden	Timra IK (Elitserien)
2	40	Anton Lander	(C)	Sweden	Timra IK (Elitserien)
3	71	Troy Hesketh	(D)	United States	Minnetonka High School (USHS-MN)
3	82 (from Philadelphia)	Cameron Abney	(RW)	Canada	Everett Silvertips (WHL)
4	99 (from Dallas via Tampa Bay and Minnesota)	Kyle Bigos	(D)	United States	Vernon Vipers (BCHL)
4	101	Toni Rajala	(RW)	Finland	Ilves (SM-liiga)
5	133 (from Minnesota)	Olivier Roy	(G)	Canada	Cape Breton Screaming Eagles (QMJHL)

== Farm teams ==
- The Oilers are affiliated with the Springfield Falcons of the American Hockey League and the Stockton Thunder of the ECHL.

== See also ==
- 2009–10 NHL season
