= 2009–10 Vancouver Canucks season =

NHL hockey team season

2009–10 Vancouver Canucks
- Northwest Division champions
- Division: 1st Northwest
- Conference: 3rd Western
- 2009–10 record: 49–28–5
- Home record: 30–8–3
- Road record: 19–20–2
- Goals for: 272
- Goals against: 222

Team information
- General manager: Mike Gillis
- Coach: Alain Vigneault
- Captain: Roberto Luongo
- Alternate captains: Ryan Kesler; Willie Mitchell; Henrik Sedin
- Arena: General Motors Place
- Average attendance: 18,810 (102.1%)
- Minor league affiliates: Manitoba Moose (AHL); Victoria Salmon Kings (ECHL)

Team leaders
- Goals: Alex Burrows (35)
- Assists: Henrik Sedin (83)
- Points: Henrik Sedin (112)
- Penalty minutes: Darcy Hordichuk (142)
- Plus/minus: Daniel Sedin and Christian Ehrhoff (+36)
- Wins: Roberto Luongo (40)
- Goals against average: Andrew Raycroft (2.42)

The 2009–10 Vancouver Canucks season was the team's 40th season in the National Hockey League (NHL).

== Season events ==
=== Off-season ===
==== Entry draft ====
At the 2009 NHL entry draft, the Vancouver Canucks drafted seven players. The Canucks did not have their own seventh-round draft pick as it had previously been traded to the Los Angeles Kings in exchange for Jason LaBarbera. The Canucks acquired a sixth-round draft pick from the Phoenix Coyotes in exchange for Shaun Heshka.

==== Free agency ====
On July 1, the Vancouver re-signed Daniel and Henrik Sedin to identical five-year, $31 million contracts. The contracts paid both players $6.1 million per season.

On July 3, 2009, Mikael Samuelsson was signed as an unrestricted free agent to a three-year contract worth $2.5 million per season.

The team lost free agent Mattias Öhlund, who had spent the first 11 seasons of his NHL career with Vancouver; he signed a seven-year, $26.25 million contract with the Tampa Bay Lightning.

On August 17, 2009, the Canucks signed prospect Sergei Shirokov to a two-year, $1.75 million contract. Shirokov was drafted in the sixth round of the 2006 NHL entry draft.

==== Trades ====
On August 28, 2009, general manager Mike Gillis traded prospects centre Patrick White and defenceman Daniel Rahimi to the San Jose Sharks in exchange for defencemen Christian Ehrhoff and Brad Lukowich.

=== Preseason ===
As part of the Kraft Hockeyville promotion, the Canucks played the New York Islanders in Terrace, British Columbia, for their first preseason game. The Canucks won by a score of 2–1.

On September 2, Mike Gillis announced that starting goaltender Roberto Luongo had signed a new 12-year, $64 million contract with the team. With Luongo being 30 years old at the time of the extension, the contract effectively ensured that Luongo would be with the Canucks for the remainder of his career. The contract included a modified no-trade clause (NTC): in the fifth year of its term, Luongo would be able to request a trade, and in the seventh year of its term, the Canucks would obtain the right to trade Luongo without his consent.

On September 24, 2009, Mike Gillis signed head coach Alain Vigneault to a new three-year contract. The extension will keep Vigneault behind the bench through the 2012–13 season. Vigneault joined the club in the 2006–07 season and led the Canucks to their two Northwest Division titles in the previous three seasons.

=== Regular season ===
The 2010 Winter Olympics took place in Vancouver—the first Winter Olympics in an NHL market since the NHL began to allow its players to compete in Olympic competition. As a result, the Canucks undertook the longest road trip in NHL history, with 14 games over six weeks, from January 27 to March 13, 2010, to allow General Motors Place to be used for ice hockey during the games. GM Place was renamed "Canada Hockey Place" during the games, as the International Olympic Committee doesn't allow corporate sponsorship for venues. The Canucks' former arena, Pacific Coliseum, was also a venue during the games, hosting figure skating and short track speed skating.

On March 19, 2010, forward Ryan Kesler signed a new six-year contract worth $30 million.

On the NHL trade deadline day, March 3, the Canucks acquired defenceman Andrew Alberts from the Carolina Hurricanes in exchange for a third-round pick in the 2010 NHL entry draft.

On March 17, 2010, the Canucks signed their first-round draft pick from the 2009 NHL Entry Draft, Jordan Schroeder. The deal was a standard entry-level contract for three years. The contract was for the entry-level maximum of US$900,000 per season along with a $270,000 signing bonus. However, because the contract was signed after the NHL trade deadline, Schroeder was ineligible to play for the Canucks for the remainder of the season. As a result, Schroeder signed an amateur tryout contract with the Canucks' American Hockey League affiliate, the Manitoba Moose.

The Canucks clinched a playoff berth for the second consecutive year with a shootout victory over the Anaheim Ducks on April 2. The Canucks also managed to clinch a second consecutive Northwest Division title when they defeated the Minnesota Wild in overtime on April 4. The win secured the Canucks a top three seed in the 2010 Stanley Cup playoffs and home ice advantage in the first round.

On April 18, 2010, the Canucks signed their 2009 third-round draft pick, Kevin Connauton. The terms of the deal were not disclosed. However, like Schroeder, Connauton was ineligible to play for the Canucks as his contract was signed after the NHL trade deadline.

The Canucks finished the regular season third overall in the Western Conference. They were the second highest scoring team, with 268 goals for, averaging 3.27 goals per game.

=== Playoffs ===
The Canucks entered the 2010 Stanley Cup playoffs as the third seed in the Western Conference. This was the first time the Canucks made the playoffs in consecutive seasons since the 2004–05 NHL lockout. In the first round, the Canucks defeated the Los Angeles Kings in six games. The Canucks lost the following round, the Conference Semi-finals, to the eventual Stanley Cup champion Chicago Blackhawks.

== Schedule and results ==
=== Pre-season ===
2009 pre-season game log: 7–0–2 (home: 4–0–1; road: 3–0–1)
#	Date	Visitor	Score	Home	OT	Decision	Attendance	Record
1	September 14	NY Islanders	1–2	Vancouver		Schneider	1,200	1–0–0
2	September 17	Vancouver	3–0	Anaheim		Luongo	14,528	2–0–0
3	September 18	Vancouver	6–2	San Jose		Raycroft	15,782	3–0–0
4	September 19	Edmonton	1–3	Vancouver		Luongo	18,630	4–0–0
5	September 21	Calgary	4–5	Vancouver	SO	Schneider	18,630	5–0–0
6	September 23	San Jose	3–4	Vancouver	SO	Luongo	18,630	6–0–0
7	September 24	Anaheim	3–2	Vancouver	OT	Raycroft	18,630	6–0–1
8	September 26	Vancouver	2–1	Calgary	SO	Luongo	19,289	7–0–1
9	September 27	Vancouver	4–5	Edmonton	OT	Schneider	16,839	7–0–2

1. Game played in Terrace, British Columbia as part of Kraft Hockeyville promotion

=== Regular season ===
2009–10 game log

October: 7–7–0 (home: 5–2–0; road: 2–5–0)
#	Date	Visitor	Score	Home	OT	Decision	Attendance	Record	Pts
1	October 1	Vancouver	3–5	Calgary		Luongo	19,289	0–1–0	0
2	October 3	Vancouver	0–3	Colorado		Luongo	13,416	0–2–0	0
3	October 5	Columbus	5–3	Vancouver		Luongo	18,810	0–3–0	0
4	October 7	Montreal	1–7	Vancouver		Luongo	18,810	1–3–0	2
5	October 11	Dallas	3–4	Vancouver	SO	Luongo	18,810	2–3–0	4
6	October 16	Vancouver	3–5	Calgary		Luongo	19,289	2–4–0	4
7	October 17	Minnesota	1–2	Vancouver		Luongo	18,810	3–4–0	6
8	October 19	Vancouver	1–2	Edmonton		Luongo	16,839	3–5–0	6
9	October 21	Vancouver	3–2	Chicago		Luongo	20,077	4–5–0	8
10	October 24	Toronto	1–3	Vancouver		Luongo	18,810	5–5–0	10
11	October 25	Edmonton	0–2	Vancouver		Luongo	18,810	6–5–0	12
12	October 27	Detroit	5–4	Vancouver		Luongo	18,810	6–6–0	12
13	October 29	Vancouver	2–1	Los Angeles	SO	Raycroft	16,838	7–6–0	14
14	October 30	Vancouver	2–7	Anaheim		Raycroft	14,756	7–7–0	14

November: 7–5–0 (home: 5–2–0; road: 2–3–0)
#	Date	Visitor	Score	Home	OT	Decision	Attendance	Record	Pts
15	November 1	Colorado	0–3	Vancouver		Raycroft	18,810	8–7–0	16
16	November 3	NY Rangers	1–4	Vancouver		Raycroft	18,810	9–7–0	18
17	November 5	Vancouver	5–2	Minnesota		Raycroft	18,105	10–7–0	20
18	November 6	Vancouver	1–2	Dallas		Schneider	17,235	10–8–0	20
19	November 10	Vancouver	1–6	St. Louis		Raycroft	17,175	10–9–0	20
20	November 12	Vancouver	1–3	Detroit		Luongo	20,066	10–10–0	20
21	November 14	Vancouver	8–2	Colorado		Luongo	15,823	11–10–0	22
22	November 20	Colorado	2–5	Vancouver		Luongo	18,810	12–10–0	24
23	November 22	Chicago	1–0	Vancouver		Luongo	18,810	12–11–0	24
24	November 26	Los Angeles	1–4	Vancouver		Luongo	18,810	13–11–0	26
25	November 28	Edmonton	3–7	Vancouver		Luongo	18,810	14–11–0	28
26	November 29	San Jose	4–2	Vancouver		Luongo	18,810	14–12–0	28

December: 10–4–1 (home: 6–2–0; road: 4–2–1)
#	Date	Visitor	Score	Home	OT	Decision	Attendance	Record	Pts
27	December 2	Vancouver	5–2	New Jersey		Luongo	13,586	15–12–0	30
28	December 3	Vancouver	3–0	Philadelphia		Luongo	18,892	16–12–0	32
29	December 5	Vancouver	3–5	Carolina		Raycroft	14,990	16–13–0	32
30	December 8	Vancouver	2–4	Nashville		Luongo	12,565	16–14–0	32
31	December 10	Atlanta	2–4	Vancouver		Luongo	18,810	17–14–0	34
32	December 12	Minnesota	3–4	Vancouver		Luongo	18,810	18–14–0	36
33	December 14	Los Angeles	1–3	Vancouver		Luongo	18,810	19–14–0	38
34	December 16	Anaheim	3–2	Vancouver		Luongo	18,810	19–15–0	38
35	December 18	Washington	2–3	Vancouver		Luongo	18,810	20–15–0	40
36	December 20	St. Louis	3–1	Vancouver		Luongo	18,810	20–16–0	40
37	December 22	Nashville	1–4	Vancouver		Luongo	18,810	21–16–0	42
38	December 26	Edmonton	1–4	Vancouver		Luongo	18,810	22–16–0	44
39	December 27	Vancouver	5–1	Calgary		Luongo	19,289	23–16–0	46
40	December 29	Vancouver	2–3	Phoenix	SO	Luongo	13,976	23–16–1	47
41	December 31	Vancouver	4–3	St. Louis	OT	Luongo	19,150	24–16–1	49

January: 10–2–1 (home: 7–1–1; road: 3–1–0)
#	Date	Visitor	Score	Home	OT	Decision	Attendance	Record	Pts
42	January 2	Vancouver	3–1	Dallas		Luongo	17,059	25–16–1	51
43	January 5	Columbus	3–7	Vancouver		Luongo	18,810	26–16–1	53
44	January 7	Phoenix	0–4	Vancouver		Luongo	18,810	27–16–1	55
45	January 9	Calgary	3–2	Vancouver	SO	Luongo	18,810	27–16–2	56
46	January 11	Nashville	3–2	Vancouver		Luongo	18,810	27–17–2	56
47	January 13	Vancouver	2–5	Minnesota		Luongo	18,356	27–18–2	56
48	January 16	Pittsburgh	2–6	Vancouver		Luongo	18,810	28–18–2	58
49	January 20	Vancouver	3–2	Edmonton	OT	Luongo	16,839	29–18–2	60
50	January 21	Dallas	3–4	Vancouver		Luongo	18,810	30–18–2	62
51	January 23	Chicago	1–5	Vancouver		Luongo	18,810	31–18–2	64
52	January 25	Buffalo	2–3	Vancouver		Luongo	18,810	32–18–2	66
53	January 27	St. Louis	2–3	Vancouver		Luongo	18,810	33–18–2	68
54	January 30	Vancouver	5–3	Toronto		Raycroft	19,534	34–18–2	70

February: 3–4–0 (home: 0–0–0; road: 3–4–0)
#	Date	Visitor	Score	Home	OT	Decision	Attendance	Record	Pts
55	February 2	Vancouver	2–3	Montreal		Luongo	21,273	34–19–2	70
56	February 4	Vancouver	1–3	Ottawa		Raycroft	18,803	34–20–2	70
57	February 6	Vancouver	3–2	Boston	SO	Luongo	17,565	35–20–2	72
58	February 9	Vancouver	1–3	Tampa Bay		Luongo	14,226	35–21–2	72
59	February 11	Vancouver	3–0	Florida		Luongo	13,787	36–21–2	74
60	February 12	Vancouver	4–3	Columbus		Raycroft	16,564	37–21–2	76
61	February 14	Vancouver	2–6	Minnesota		Luongo	19,342	37–22–2	76

March: 9–4–2 (home: 5–1–1; road: 4–3–1)
#	Date	Visitor	Score	Home	OT	Decision	Attendance	Record	Pts
62	March 2	Vancouver	4–3	Columbus	OT	Raycroft	14,513	38–22–2	78
63	March 3	Vancouver	6–3	Detroit		Luongo	19,536	39–22–2	80
64	March 5	Vancouver	3–6	Chicago		Luongo	22,235	39–23–2	80
65	March 7	Vancouver	4–2	Nashville		Luongo	16,096	40–23–2	82
66	March 9	Vancouver	6–4	Colorado		Luongo	12,861	41–23–2	84
67	March 10	Vancouver	3–4	Phoenix	SO	Raycroft	15,883	41–23–3	85
68	March 13	Ottawa	1–5	Vancouver		Luongo	18,810	42–23–3	87
69	March 14	Calgary	1–3	Vancouver		Luongo	18,810	43–23–3	89
70	March 16	NY Islanders	5–2	Vancouver		Luongo	18,810	43–24–3	89
71	March 18	San Jose	2–3	Vancouver		Luongo	18,810	44–24–3	91
72	March 20	Detroit	4–3	Vancouver	OT	Luongo	18,810	44–24–4	92
73	March 23	Vancouver	2–3	Edmonton		Luongo	16,839	44–25–4	92
74	March 24	Anaheim	1–4	Vancouver		Raycroft	18,810	45–25–4	94
75	March 27	Vancouver	2–4	San Jose		Luongo	17,562	45–26–4	94
76	March 30	Phoenix	1–4	Vancouver		Luongo	18,810	46–26–4	96

April: 3–2–1 (home: 2–0–1; road: 1–2–0)
#	Date	Visitor	Score	Home	OT	Decision	Attendance	Record	Pts
77	April 1	Vancouver	3–8	Los Angeles		Luongo	18,118	46–27–4	96
78	April 2	Vancouver	5–4	Anaheim	SO	Raycroft	16,534	47–27–4	98
79	April 4	Minnesota	3–4	Vancouver	OT	Luongo	18,810	48–27–4	100
80	April 6	Colorado	4–3	Vancouver	SO	Luongo	18,810	48–27–5	101
81	April 8	Vancouver	2–4	San Jose		Raycroft	17,562	48–28–5	101
82	April 10	Calgary	3–7	Vancouver		Luongo	18,810	49–28–5	103

Legend: Win (2 points) Loss (0 points) Overtime/shootout loss (1 point)

=== Playoffs ===
2010 Stanley Cup playoffs

Western Conference quarter-final vs. (6) Los Angeles Kings: Vancouver won series 4–2
#	Date	Visitor	Score	Home	OT	Decision	Attendance	Series	Recap
1	April 15	Los Angeles	2–3	Vancouver	OT	Luongo	18,810	1–0	Recap
2	April 17	Los Angeles	3–2	Vancouver	OT	Luongo	18,810	1–1	Recap
3	April 19	Vancouver	3–5	Los Angeles		Luongo	18,264	1–2	Recap
4	April 21	Vancouver	6–4	Los Angeles		Luongo	18,322	2–2	Recap
5	April 23	Los Angeles	2–7	Vancouver		Luongo	18,810	3–2	Recap
6	April 25	Vancouver	4–2	Los Angeles		Luongo	18,287	4–2	Recap

Western Conference semi-final vs. (2) Chicago Blackhawks: Chicago won series 4–2
#	Date	Visitor	Score	Home	OT	Decision	Attendance	Series	Recap
1	May 1	Vancouver	5–1	Chicago		Luongo	22,184	1–0	Recap
2	May 3	Vancouver	2–4	Chicago		Luongo	22,142	1–1	Recap
3	May 5	Chicago	5–2	Vancouver		Luongo	18,810	1–2	Recap
4	May 7	Chicago	7–4	Vancouver		Luongo	18,810	1–3	Recap
5	May 9	Vancouver	4–1	Chicago		Luongo	22,192	2–3	Recap
6	May 11	Chicago	5–1	Vancouver		Luongo	18,810	2–4	Recap

Legend: Win Loss

== Standings ==
=== Divisional standings ===
Northwest Division
		GP	W	L	OTL	GF	GA	Pts
**1**	**y – Vancouver Canucks**	**82**	**49**	**28**	**5**	**272**	**222**	**103**
**2**	**Colorado Avalanche**	**82**	**43**	**30**	**9**	**244**	**233**	**95**
3	Calgary Flames	82	40	32	10	204	210	90
4	Minnesota Wild	82	38	36	8	219	246	84
5	Edmonton Oilers	82	27	47	8	214	284	62

=== Conference standings ===
Western Conference
R		Div	GP	W	L	OTL	GF	GA	Pts
**1**	**z – San Jose Sharks**	**PA**	**82**	**51**	**20**	**11**	**264**	**215**	113
**2**	**y – Chicago Blackhawks**	**CE**	**82**	**52**	**22**	**8**	**271**	**209**	112
**3**	**y – Vancouver Canucks**	**NW**	**82**	**49**	**28**	**5**	**272**	**222**	103
**4**	**Phoenix Coyotes**	**PA**	**82**	**50**	**25**	**7**	**225**	**202**	107
**5**	**Detroit Red Wings**	**CE**	**82**	**44**	**24**	**14**	**229**	**216**	102
**6**	**Los Angeles Kings**	**PA**	**82**	**46**	**27**	**9**	**241**	**219**	101
**7**	**Nashville Predators**	**CE**	**82**	**47**	**29**	**6**	**225**	**225**	100
**8**	**Colorado Avalanche**	**NW**	**82**	**43**	**30**	**9**	**244**	**233**	95
8.5
9	Calgary Flames	NW	82	40	32	10	225	223	90
10	St. Louis Blues	CE	82	40	32	10	204	210	90
11	Anaheim Ducks	PA	82	39	32	11	238	251	89
12	Dallas Stars	PA	82	37	31	14	237	254	88
13	Minnesota Wild	NW	82	38	36	8	219	246	84
14	Columbus Blue Jackets	CE	82	32	35	15	216	259	79
15	Edmonton Oilers	NW	82	27	47	8	214	284	62

bold – Qualified for playoffs; y – Won division; z – Won conference (and division)

== Player statistics ==
=== Skaters ===
Note: GP = Games played; G = Goals; A = Assists; Pts = Points; +/- = Plus/minus; PIM = Penalty minutes

Regular season

Player	GP	G	A	Pts	+/-	PIM
Henrik Sedin	82	29	83	112	+35	48
Daniel Sedin	63	29	56	85	+36	28
Ryan Kesler	82	25	50	75	+1	104
Alex Burrows	82	35	32	67	+34	121
Mikael Samuelsson	74	30	23	53	+10	64
Mason Raymond	82	25	28	53	0	48
Christian Ehrhoff	80	14	30	44	+36	42
Alexander Edler	76	5	37	42	0	40
Sami Salo	68	9	19	28	+14	18
Kyle Wellwood	75	14	11	25	+6	12
Steve Bernier	59	11	11	22	0	21
Kevin Bieksa	55	3	19	22	−5	85
Pavol Demitra	28	3	13	16	+3	0
Jannik Hansen	47	9	6	15	−5	18
Willie Mitchell	48	4	8	12	+13	48
Michael Grabner	20	5	6	11	+2	8
Tanner Glass	67	4	7	11	+5	115
Rick Rypien	69	4	4	8	−3	126
Shane O'Brien	65	2	6	8	+15	79
Ryan Johnson	58	1	4	5	−4	12
Mathieu Schneider^{‡}	17	2	3	5	0	12
Aaron Rome	49	0	4	4	−2	24
Matt Pettinger	9	1	2	3	+3	6
Brad Lukowich	13	1	1	2	+5	4
Nolan Baumgartner	12	1	1	2	+7	2
Darcy Hordichuk	56	1	1	2	−7	142
Andrew Alberts^{†}	14	1	1	2	−1	13
Alexandre Bolduc	15	0	0	0	−3	13
Guillaume Desbiens	1	0	0	0	0	2
Mario Bliznak	2	0	0	0	−2	0
Sergei Shirokov	6	0	0	0	−4	2
Evan Oberg	2	0	0	0	0	0

Playoffs

Player	GP	G	A	Pts	+/-	PIM
Mikael Samuelsson	12	8	7	15	+7	16
Daniel Sedin	12	5	9	14	+4	12
Henrik Sedin	12	3	11	14	+3	6
Ryan Kesler	12	1	9	10	+3	4
Kevin Bieksa	12	3	5	8	+2	14
Christian Ehrhoff	12	3	4	7	−1	8
Kyle Wellwood	12	2	5	7	−1	0
Pavol Demitra	11	2	4	6	+2	4
Sami Salo	12	1	5	6	+2	2
Alex Burrows	12	3	3	6	+4	22
Alexander Edler	12	2	4	6	+9	10
Steve Bernier	12	4	1	5	−1	0
Mason Raymond	12	3	1	4	0	6
Shane O'Brien	12	1	2	3	+3	25
Jannik Hansen	12	1	2	3	+1	4
Andrew Alberts	10	0	1	1	+1	27
Rick Rypien	7	0	1	1	+1	7
Michael Grabner	9	1	0	1	+2	0
Nolan Baumgartner	1	0	0	0	0	0
Ryan Johnson	4	0	0	0	−2	2
Matt Pettinger	1	0	0	0	0	0
Aaron Rome	1	0	0	0	0	0
Tanner Glass	4	0	0	0	0	0

=== Goaltenders ===
Note: GP = Games played; TOI = Time on ice (minutes); W = Wins; L = Losses; OT = Overtime losses; GA = Goals against; GAA= Goals against average; SA= Shots against; SV= Saves; Sv% = Save percentage; SO= Shutouts

Regular season

Player	GP	Min	W	L	OT	GA	GAA	SA	SV	Sv%	SO
Roberto Luongo	68	3,899	40	22	4	167	2.57	1915	1748	.913	4
Andrew Raycroft	21	967	9	5	1	39	2.42	438	399	.911	1
Cory Schneider	2	79	0	1	0	5	3.80	59	54	.915	0

Playoffs

Player	GP	Min	W	L	GA	GAA	SA	SV	Sv%	SO
Roberto Luongo	12	707	6	6	38	3.22	362	324	.895	0
Andrew Raycroft	1	25	0	0	1	2.40	7	6	.857	0

^{†}Denotes player spent time with another team before joining Canucks. Stats reflect time with Canucks only.
^{‡}Traded mid-season. Stats reflect time with Canucks only.

== Awards and records ==
=== Records ===
Regular season
Player	Record	Reached
Roberto Luongo	Franchise shutouts leader, 21	October 25, 2009
Henrik Sedin	Franchise assists leader, 416	March 14, 2010
Henrik Sedin	Single season assists record, 83	March 27, 2010
Vancouver Canucks	Single season franchise home wins, 28	March 30, 2010
Henrik Sedin	Single season points record, 112	April 10, 2010

=== Milestones ===
Regular season
Player	Milestone	Reached
Sergei Shirokov	1st game	October 1, 2009
Guillaume Desbiens	1st game	October 11, 2009
Michael Grabner	1st game 1st assist 1st point	October 16, 2009
Michael Grabner	1st goal	October 21, 2009
Mario Bliznak	1st game	October 30, 2009
Henrik Sedin	1st career hat trick	November 14, 2009
Daniel Sedin	3rd career hat trick	December 10, 2009
Mason Raymond	1st career hat trick	December 27, 2009
Alex Burrows	2nd career hat trick	January 5, 2010
Alex Burrows	3rd career hat trick	January 7, 2010
Steve Bernier	300th career game	January 7, 2010
Kyle Wellwood	300th career game	January 7, 2010
Evan Oberg	1st game	January 9, 2010
Henrik Sedin	700th career game	January 30, 2010
Christian Ehrhoff	400th career game	February 11, 2010
Andrew Raycroft	100th career win	February 12, 2010
Mikael Samuelsson	1st career hat trick	March 9, 2010
Daniel Sedin	200th career goal	March 23, 2010
Daniel Sedin	700th career game	April 1, 2010
Michael Grabner	1st career hat trick	April 2, 2010
Daniel Sedin	4th career hat trick	April 10, 2010

=== Awards ===
Regular season
Player	Award	Awarded
Henrik Sedin	NHL Third Star of the Week	October 12, 2009
Daniel Sedin	NHL Second Star of the Week	December 14, 2009
Roberto Luongo	NHL Third Star of the Week	December 28, 2009
Henrik Sedin	NHL First Star of the Month	December 2009
Alex Burrows	NHL First Star of the Week	January 11, 2010
Henrik Sedin	NHL Second Star of the Month	January 2010
Mikael Samuelsson	NHL First Star of the Week	March 15, 2010
Henrik Sedin	NHL Third Star of the Month	March 2010
Christian Ehrhoff	Babe Pratt Trophy winner	April 10, 2010
Henrik Sedin	Cyclone Taylor Trophy winner	April 10, 2010
Henrik Sedin	Cyrus H. McLean Trophy winner	April 10, 2010
Mason Raymond	Fred J. Hume Award winner	April 10, 2010
Henrik Sedin	Molson Cup winner	April 10, 2010
Alex Burrows	Most Exciting Player Award winner	April 10, 2010
Henrik Sedin	Art Ross Trophy winner	April 11, 2010
Henrik Sedin	Hart Trophy winner	June 23, 2010

== Transactions ==
=== Trades ===
June 27, 2009	To Vancouver Canucks 7th-round pick (187th overall) in 2009	To Phoenix Coyotes Shaun Heshka
August 28, 2009	To Vancouver Canucks Christian Ehrhoff; Brad Lukowich	To San Jose Sharks Daniel Rahimi; Patrick White
March 3, 2010	To Vancouver Canucks Yan Stastny	To St. Louis Blues Pierre-Cedric Labrie
March 3, 2010	To Vancouver Canucks Sean Zimmerman; Conditional 6th-round pick in 2010 (Note: Condition satisfied.)	To Phoenix Coyotes Mathieu Schneider
March 3, 2010	To Vancouver Canucks Andrew Alberts	To Carolina Hurricanes 3rd-round pick in 2010

=== Free agents acquired ===
Player	Former team	Contract terms
Aaron Rome	Columbus Blue Jackets	1 year, $550,000
Lawrence Nycholat	Colorado Avalanche	1 year, $500,000
Mikael Samuelsson	Detroit Red Wings	3 years, $7.5 million
Tanner Glass	Florida Panthers	1 year, $500,000
Andrew Raycroft	Colorado Avalanche	1 year, $500,000
Michael Funk	Buffalo Sabres	1 year
Mathieu Schneider	Montreal Canadiens	1 year, $1.55 million
Matt Pettinger	Tampa Bay Lightning	1 year, $500,000

=== Free agents lost ===
Player	New team	Contract terms
Mattias Ohlund	Tampa Bay Lightning	7 years, $26.25 million
Jason LaBarbera	Phoenix Coyotes	2 years, $2 million
Jason Krog	Atlanta Thrashers	2 years, $1.1 million
Jason Jaffray	Calgary Flames	2 years, $1 million
Mark Cullen	Chicago Blackhawks	1 year
Zack Fitzgerald	Carolina Hurricanes	1 year
Ossi Vaananen	Dinamo Minsk (KHL)	
Rob Davison	New Jersey Devils	
Taylor Pyatt	Phoenix Coyotes	1 year

== Draft picks ==
Vancouver's picks at the 2009 NHL entry draft in Montreal, Quebec.

Round	#	Player	Nationality	College/junior/club team (League)
1	22	Jordan Schroeder (C)	United States	University of Minnesota (WCHA)
2	53	Anton Rodin (RW)	Sweden	Brynas IF Jr. (J20 SuperElit)
3	83	Kevin Connauton (D)	Canada	Western Michigan University (CCHA)
4	113	Jeremy Price (D)	Canada	Nepean Raiders (CJHL)
5	143	Peter Andersson (D)	Sweden	Frolunda HC Jr. (J20 SuperElit)
6	173	Joe Cannata (G)	United States	Merrimack College (Hockey East)
7	187^{1}	Steven Anthony (LW)	Canada	Saint John Sea Dogs (QMJHL)

^1 This draft pick originally belonged to the Phoenix Coyotes. It was acquired from Phoenix in exchange for Shaun Heshka.

== Farm teams ==
- The Manitoba Moose will remain the Canucks' American Hockey League affiliate for the 2009–10 season.
- The Victoria Salmon Kings will remain the Canucks' ECHL affiliate for the 2009–10 season.

== See also ==
- 2009–10 NHL season
