= List of Vancouver Canucks seasons =

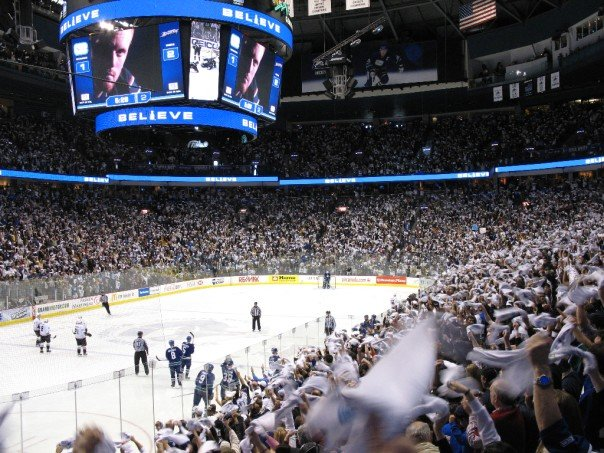
Rogers Arena, home of the Canucks, during a 2007 playoff game.

The Vancouver Canucks are a professional ice hockey team based in Vancouver. The Canucks are members of the National Hockey League (NHL) and are members of the Pacific Division in the Western Conference. The Canucks were founded in 1945 as a member of the Pacific Coast Hockey League (PCHL). They won the President's Cup in their first season, and another in 1948. In 1952, the PCHL was renamed the Western Hockey League (WHL), where the Canucks won four more league titles in 1958, 1960, 1969 and 1970. In 1960, the President's Cup was renamed the Lester Patrick Cup to honour the late Lester Patrick.

After a failed attempt to gain an expansion team in the NHL's first expansion in 1967, a group from Vancouver tried to move the financial struggling Oakland Seals to town in 1969. However, the NHL prevented the move from happening. Prior to the 1970 NHL expansion a Minneapolis, Minnesota based company, Medicor, purchased the WHL Canucks, and an expansion franchise was granted for the NHL beginning in the 1970–71 season. The Canucks have not enjoyed the same success in the NHL, having thus far been unable to capture the Stanley Cup; as of the conclusion of the 2023-24 season, they are tied with their fellow class of 1970 newcomers the Buffalo Sabres as the longest continuously (and currently) active franchises with zero titles. The Canucks franchise has captured three conference titles, 1981–82, 1993–94, and 2010–11, and eleven division titles in its NHL history.

== Table key ==
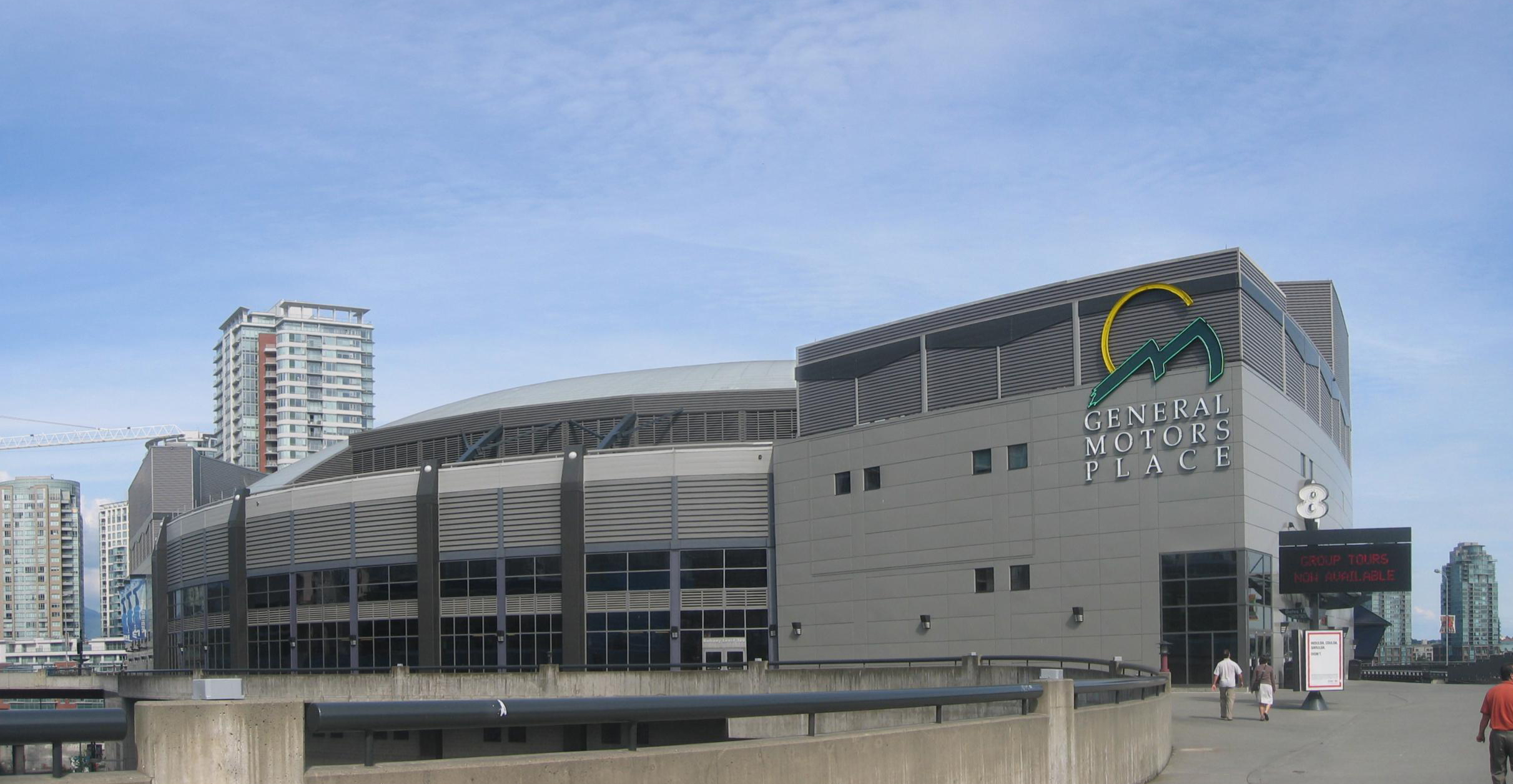
Exterior of Rogers Arena (formerly known as General Motors Place), home of the Canucks since 1995

Key of colors and symbols
| Color/symbol | Explanation |
|---|---|
| † | Stanley Cup champions |
| ‡ | Conference champions |
| ↑ | Division champions |
| # | Led league in points |

Key of terms and abbreviations
| Term or abbreviation | Definition |
|---|---|
| Finish | Final position in division or league standings |
| GP | Number of games played |
| W | Number of wins |
| L | Number of losses |
| T | Number of ties |
| OT | Number of losses in overtime (since the 1999–2000 season) |
| Pts | Number of points |
| GF | Goals for (goals scored by the Canucks) |
| GA | Goals against (goals scored by the Canucks' opponents) |
| — | Does not apply |

== Year by year ==
For the PCHL and WHL seasons, see Vancouver Canucks (WHL).

| Season | Canucks season | Conference | Division | Regular season | | | | | | | | | Postseason | | | | | |
| Season | Canucks season | Conference | Division | Finish | GP | W | L | T^{a} | OT^{a} | Pts | GF | GA | GP | W | L | GF | GA | Result |
|---|---|---|---|---|---|---|---|---|---|---|---|---|---|---|---|---|---|---|
| 1970–71 | 1970–71 | — | East | 6th | 78 | 24 | 46 | 8 | — | 56 | 229 | 296 | — | — | — | — | — | Did not qualify |
| 1971–72 | 1971–72 | — | East | 7th | 78 | 20 | 50 | 8 | — | 48 | 203 | 297 | — | — | — | — | — | Did not qualify |
| 1972–73 | 1972–73 | — | East | 7th | 78 | 22 | 47 | 9 | — | 53 | 233 | 339 | — | — | — | — | — | Did not qualify |
| 1973–74 | 1973–74 | — | East | 7th | 78 | 24 | 43 | 11 | — | 59 | 224 | 296 | — | — | — | — | — | Did not qualify |
| 1974–75 | 1974–75 | Campbell | Smythe↑ | 1st | 80 | 38 | 32 | 10 | — | 86 | 271 | 254 | 5 | 1 | 4 | 9 | 20 | Lost in quarterfinals, 1–4 (Canadiens) |
| 1975–76 | 1975–76 | Campbell | Smythe | 2nd | 80 | 33 | 32 | 15 | — | 81 | 271 | 272 | 2 | 0 | 2 | 4 | 8 | Lost in preliminary round, 0–2 (Islanders) |
| 1976–77 | 1976–77 | Campbell | Smythe | 4th | 80 | 25 | 42 | 13 | — | 63 | 235 | 294 | — | — | — | — | — | Did not qualify |
| 1977–78 | 1977–78 | Campbell | Smythe | 3rd | 80 | 20 | 43 | 17 | — | 57 | 239 | 320 | — | — | — | — | — | Did not qualify |
| 1978–79 | 1978–79 | Campbell | Smythe | 3rd | 80 | 25 | 42 | 13 | — | 63 | 217 | 291 | 3 | 1 | 2 | 9 | 15 | Lost in preliminary round, 1–2 (Flyers) |
| 1979–80 | 1979–80 | Campbell | Smythe | 3rd | 80 | 27 | 37 | 16 | — | 70 | 256 | 281 | 4 | 1 | 3 | 7 | 15 | Lost in preliminary round, 1–3 (Sabres) |
| 1980–81 | 1980–81 | Campbell | Smythe | 2nd | 80 | 28 | 32 | 20 | — | 76 | 289 | 301 | 3 | 0 | 3 | 7 | 13 | Lost in preliminary round, 0–3 (Sabres) |
| 1981–82 | 1981–82 | Campbell‡ | Smythe | 2nd | 80 | 30 | 33 | 17 | — | 77 | 290 | 286 | 17 | 11 | 6 | 57 | 50 | Won in division semifinals, 3–0 (Flames); Won in division finals, 4–1 (Kings); Won in conference finals, 4–1 (Black Hawks); Lost in Stanley Cup Final, 0–4 (Islanders) |
| 1982–83 | 1982–83 | Campbell | Smythe | 3rd | 80 | 30 | 35 | 15 | — | 75 | 303 | 309 | 4 | 1 | 3 | 14 | 17 | Lost in division semifinals, 1–3 (Flames) |
| 1983–84 | 1983–84 | Campbell | Smythe | 3rd | 80 | 32 | 39 | 9 | — | 73 | 306 | 328 | 4 | 1 | 3 | 13 | 14 | Lost in division semifinals, 1–3 (Flames) |
| 1984–85 | 1984–85 | Campbell | Smythe | 5th | 80 | 25 | 46 | 9 | — | 59 | 284 | 401 | — | — | — | — | — | Did not qualify |
| 1985–86 | 1985–86 | Campbell | Smythe | 4th | 80 | 23 | 44 | 13 | — | 59 | 282 | 333 | 3 | 0 | 3 | 5 | 17 | Lost in division semifinals, 0–3 (Oilers) |
| 1986–87 | 1986–87 | Campbell | Smythe | 5th | 80 | 29 | 43 | 8 | — | 66 | 282 | 314 | — | — | — | — | — | Did not qualify |
| 1987–88 | 1987–88 | Campbell | Smythe | 5th | 80 | 25 | 46 | 9 | — | 59 | 272 | 320 | — | — | — | — | — | Did not qualify |
| 1988–89 | 1988–89 | Campbell | Smythe | 4th | 80 | 33 | 39 | 8 | — | 74 | 251 | 253 | 7 | 3 | 4 | 20 | 22 | Lost in division semifinals, 3–4 (Flames) |
| 1989–90 | 1989–90 | Campbell | Smythe | 5th | 80 | 25 | 41 | 14 | — | 64 | 245 | 306 | — | — | — | — | — | Did not qualify |
| 1990–91 | 1990–91 | Campbell | Smythe | 4th | 80 | 28 | 43 | 9 | — | 65 | 243 | 315 | 6 | 2 | 4 | 16 | 26 | Lost in division semifinals, 2–4 (Kings) |
| 1991–92 | 1991–92 | Campbell | Smythe↑ | 1st | 80 | 42 | 26 | 12 | — | 96 | 285 | 250 | 13 | 6 | 7 | 44 | 35 | Won in division semifinals, 4–3 (Jets); Lost in division finals, 2–4 (Oilers) |
| 1992–93 | 1992–93 | Campbell | Smythe↑ | 1st | 84 | 46 | 29 | 9 | — | 101 | 346 | 278 | 12 | 6 | 6 | 46 | 43 | Won in division semifinals, 4–2 (Jets); Lost in division finals, 2–4 (Kings) |
| 1993–94 | 1993–94 | Western‡ | Pacific | 2nd | 84 | 41 | 40 | 3 | — | 85 | 279 | 276 | 24 | 15 | 9 | 76 | 61 | Won in conference quarterfinals, 4–3 (Flames); Won in conference semifinals, 4–1 (Stars); Won in conference finals, 4–1 (Maple Leafs); Lost in Stanley Cup Final, 3–4 (Rangers) |
| 1994–95^{b} | 1994–95 | Western | Pacific | 2nd | 48 | 18 | 18 | 12 | — | 48 | 153 | 148 | 11 | 4 | 7 | 33 | 38 | Won in conference quarterfinals, 4–3 (Blues); Lost in conference semifinals, 0–4 (Blackhawks) |
| 1995–96 | 1995–96 | Western | Pacific | 3rd | 82 | 32 | 35 | 15 | — | 79 | 278 | 278 | 6 | 2 | 4 | 17 | 24 | Lost in conference quarterfinals, 2–4 (Avalanche) |
| 1996–97 | 1996–97 | Western | Pacific | 4th | 82 | 35 | 40 | 7 | — | 77 | 257 | 273 | — | — | — | — | — | Did not qualify |
| 1997–98 | 1997–98 | Western | Pacific | 7th | 82 | 25 | 43 | 14 | — | 64 | 224 | 273 | — | — | — | — | — | Did not qualify |
| 1998–99 | 1998–99 | Western | Northwest | 4th | 82 | 23 | 47 | 12 | — | 58 | 192 | 258 | — | — | — | — | — | Did not qualify |
| 1999–2000 | 1999–2000 | Western | Northwest | 3rd | 82 | 30 | 29 | 15 | 8 | 83 | 227 | 237 | — | — | — | — | — | Did not qualify |
| 2000–01 | 2000–01 | Western | Northwest | 3rd | 82 | 36 | 28 | 11 | 7 | 90 | 239 | 238 | 4 | 0 | 4 | 9 | 16 | Lost in conference quarterfinals, 0–4 (Avalanche) |
| 2001–02 | 2001–02 | Western | Northwest | 2nd | 82 | 42 | 30 | 7 | 3 | 94 | 254 | 211 | 6 | 2 | 4 | 16 | 22 | Lost in conference quarterfinals, 2–4 (Red Wings) |
| 2002–03 | 2002–03 | Western | Northwest | 2nd | 82 | 45 | 23 | 13 | 1 | 104 | 264 | 208 | 14 | 7 | 7 | 34 | 47 | Won in conference quarterfinals, 4–3 (Blues); Lost in conference semifinals, 3–4 (Wild) |
| 2003–04 | 2003–04 | Western | Northwest↑ | 1st | 82 | 43 | 24 | 10 | 5 | 101 | 235 | 194 | 7 | 3 | 4 | 16 | 19 | Lost in conference quarterfinals, 3–4 (Flames) |
| 2004–05 | 2004–05 | Season cancelled due to 2004–05 NHL Lockout | | | | | | | | | | | | | | | | |
| 2005–06 | 2005–06 | Western | Northwest | 4th | 82 | 42 | 32 | — | 8 | 92 | 256 | 255 | — | — | — | — | — | Did not qualify |
| 2006–07 | 2006–07 | Western | Northwest↑ | 1st | 82 | 49 | 26 | — | 7 | 105 | 222 | 201 | 12 | 5 | 7 | 21 | 26 | Won in conference quarterfinals, 4–3 (Stars); Lost in conference semifinals, 1–4 (Ducks) |
| 2007–08 | 2007–08 | Western | Northwest | 5th | 82 | 39 | 33 | — | 10 | 88 | 213 | 215 | — | — | — | — | — | Did not qualify |
| 2008–09 | 2008–09 | Western | Northwest↑ | 1st | 82 | 45 | 27 | — | 10 | 100 | 246 | 220 | 10 | 6 | 4 | 30 | 28 | Won in conference quarterfinals, 4–0 (Blues); Lost in conference semifinals, 2–4 (Blackhawks) |
| 2009–10 | 2009–10 | Western | Northwest↑ | 1st | 82 | 49 | 28 | — | 5 | 103 | 272 | 222 | 12 | 6 | 6 | 42 | 41 | Won in conference quarterfinals, 4–2 (Kings); Lost in conference semifinals, 2–4 (Blackhawks) |
| 2010–11 | 2010–11 | Western‡ | Northwest↑ | 1st | 82 | 54 | 19 | — | 9 | 117# | 262 | 185 | 25 | 15 | 10 | 58 | 69 | Won in conference quarterfinals, 4–3 (Blackhawks); Won in conference semifinals, 4–2 (Predators); Won in conference finals, 4–1 (Sharks); Lost in Stanley Cup Final, 3–4 (Bruins) |
| 2011–12 | 2011–12 | Western | Northwest↑ | 1st | 82 | 51 | 22 | — | 9 | 111# | 249 | 198 | 5 | 1 | 4 | 8 | 12 | Lost in conference quarterfinals, 1–4 (Kings) |
| 2012–13^{c} | 2012–13 | Western | Northwest↑ | 1st | 48 | 26 | 15 | — | 7 | 59 | 127 | 121 | 4 | 0 | 4 | 8 | 15 | Lost in conference quarterfinals, 0–4 (Sharks) |
| 2013–14 | 2013–14 | Western | Pacific | 5th | 82 | 36 | 35 | — | 11 | 83 | 196 | 223 | — | — | — | — | — | Did not qualify |
| 2014–15 | 2014–15 | Western | Pacific | 2nd | 82 | 48 | 29 | — | 5 | 101 | 242 | 222 | 6 | 2 | 4 | 14 | 18 | Lost in first round, 2–4 (Flames) |
| 2015–16 | 2015–16 | Western | Pacific | 6th | 82 | 31 | 38 | — | 13 | 75 | 191 | 243 | — | — | — | — | — | Did not qualify |
| 2016–17 | 2016–17 | Western | Pacific | 7th | 82 | 30 | 43 | — | 9 | 69 | 182 | 243 | — | — | — | — | — | Did not qualify |
| 2017–18 | 2017–18 | Western | Pacific | 7th | 82 | 31 | 40 | — | 11 | 73 | 218 | 264 | — | — | — | — | — | Did not qualify |
| 2018–19 | 2018–19 | Western | Pacific | 5th | 82 | 35 | 36 | — | 11 | 81 | 225 | 257 | — | — | — | — | — | Did not qualify |
| 2019–20^{d} | 2019–20 | Western | Pacific | 3rd | 69 | 36 | 27 | — | 6 | 78 | 228 | 217 | 17 | 10 | 7 | 48 | 45 | Won in qualifying round, 3–1 (Wild); Won in first round, 4–2 (Blues); Lost in second round, 3–4 (Golden Knights) |
| 2020–21^{e} | 2020–21 | — | North | 7th | 56 | 23 | 29 | — | 4 | 50 | 151 | 188 | — | — | — | — | — | Did not qualify |
| 2021–22 | 2021–22 | Western | Pacific | 5th | 82 | 40 | 30 | — | 12 | 92 | 249 | 236 | — | — | — | — | — | Did not qualify |
| 2022–23 | 2022–23 | Western | Pacific | 6th | 82 | 38 | 37 | — | 7 | 83 | 276 | 298 | — | — | — | — | — | Did not qualify |
| 2023–24 | 2023–24 | Western | Pacific↑ | 1st | 82 | 50 | 23 | — | 9 | 109 | 279 | 223 | 13 | 7 | 6 | 33 | 36 | Won in first round, 4–2 (Predators); Lost in second round, 3–4 (Oilers) |
| 2024–25 | 2024–25 | Western | Pacific | 5th | 82 | 38 | 30 | — | 14 | 90 | 236 | 253 | — | — | — | — | — | Did not qualify |
| 2025–26 | 2025–26 | Western | Pacific | 8th | 82 | 25 | 49 | — | 8 | 58 | 212 | 316 | — | — | — | — | — | Did not qualify |
| Totals | | | | | 4,355 | 1,840 | 1,915 | 391 | 209 | 4,280 | 13,309 | 14,240 | 259 | 118 | 141 | 715 | 816 | 29 playoff appearances |

=== Notes ===
a: Beginning in 1999, overtime losses were worth one point. As of the 2005–06 NHL season, all games will have a winner with ties eliminated; the OT column includes SOL (shootout losses).
b: Season was shortened to 48 games due to the 1994–95 NHL lockout.
c: Season was shortened to 48 games due to the 2012–13 NHL lockout.
d: Season was suspended on March 12, 2020 due to the COVID-19 pandemic.
e: Season was shortened to 56 games due to the aforementioned COVID-19 pandemic.

== All-time records ==
| Statistic | GP | W | L | T | OT | GF | GA |
|---|---|---|---|---|---|---|---|
| Vancouver Canucks regular-season record (1970–present) | 4,273 | 1,815 | 1,866 | 391 | 201 | 13,097 | 13,924 |
| Vancouver Canucks postseason record (1970–present) | 259 | 118 | 141 | — | — | 715 | 816 |
| All-time regular and postseason record | 4,532 | 1,933 | 2,007 | 391 | 201 | 13,812 | 14,740 |

Statistics above are correct as of the end of the 2024–25 NHL season.
