= Vernon Fiddler =

Canadian ice hockey player (born 1980)

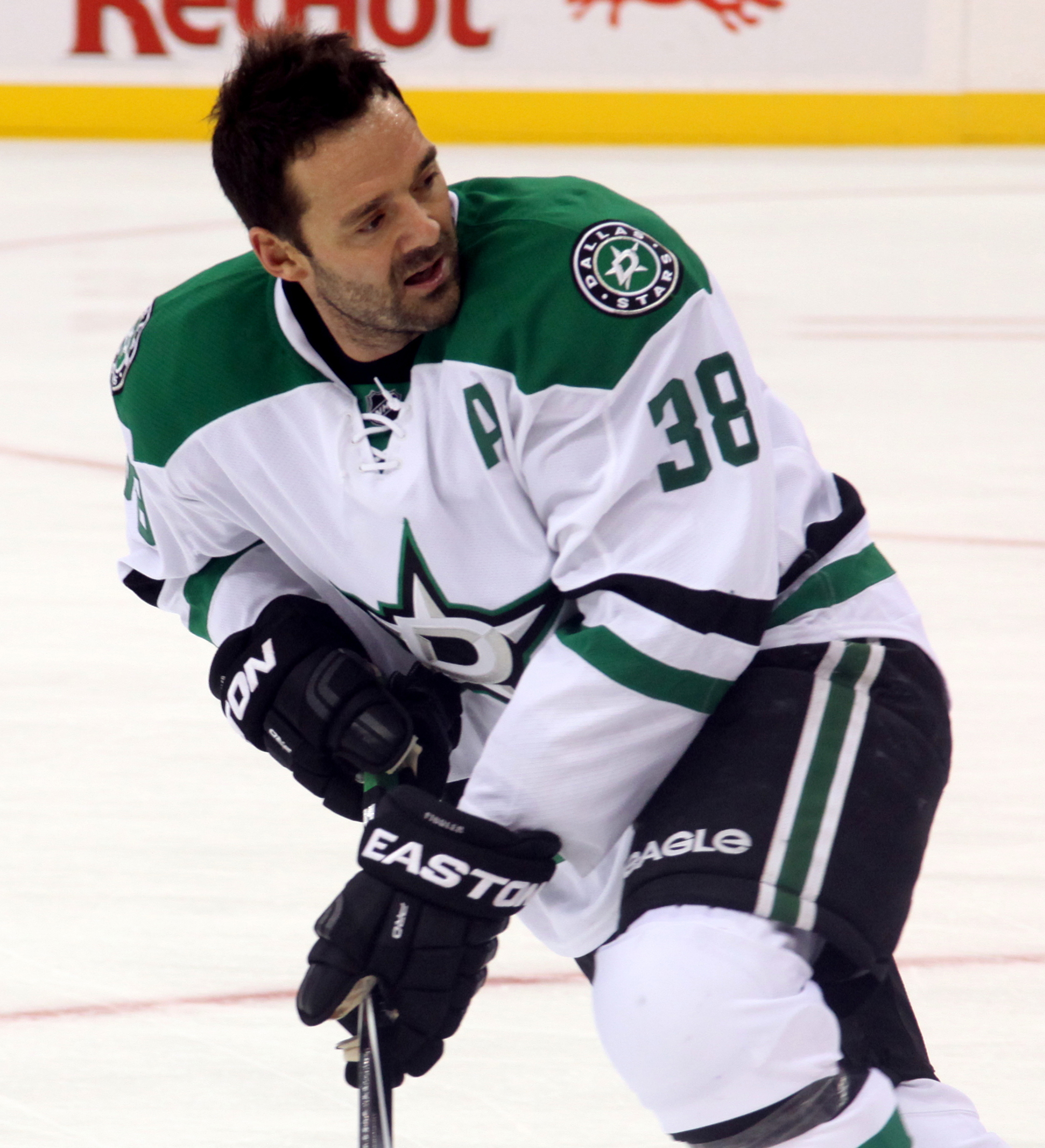
- Fiddler with the Dallas Stars in 2014
- Born: May 9, 1980 (age 46) Edmonton, Alberta, Canada
- Height: 5 ft 11 in (180 cm)
- Weight: 205 lb (93 kg; 14 st 9 lb)
- Position: Centre/Left wing
- Shot: Left
- Played for: Nashville Predators; Phoenix Coyotes; Dallas Stars; New Jersey Devils
- NHL draft: Undrafted
- Playing career: 2001–2017

Vernon Fiddler (born May 9, 1980) is a retired Canadian professional ice hockey centre who played in the National Hockey League for the Nashville Predators, Phoenix Coyotes, Dallas Stars and New Jersey Devils.

== Playing career ==
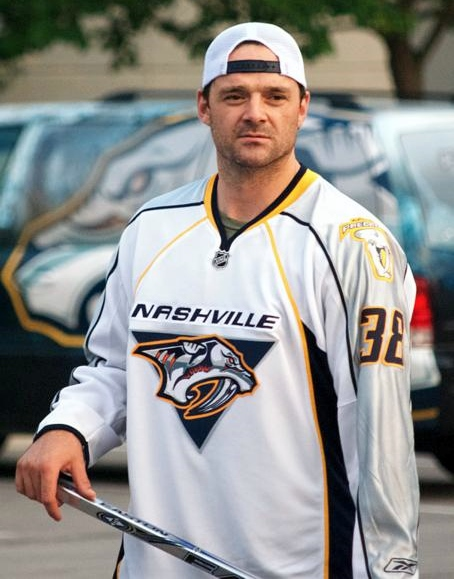
Fiddler in 2009

Undrafted, Fiddler played in the Western Hockey League with the Kelowna Rockets and the Medicine Hat Tigers before turning pro in 2001. As a free agent, Fiddler played the 2001–02 season with the Roanoke Express of the ECHL and the Norfolk Admirals of the American Hockey League.

On May 6, 2002, Fiddler was signed by the Nashville Predators and was assigned to affiliate, the Milwaukee Admirals. He later made his NHL debut with the Predators in November 2002, and played 19 NHL games during the 2002–03 season. In the 2003–04 season Fiddler helped the Admirals win the Calder Cup. Fiddler spent the next 2 years playing between the Predators and the Admirals before playing his first full NHL season in 2006–07.

On July 1, 2009, after playing 305 games for the Predators, Fiddler signed as a free agent with the Phoenix Coyotes. He recorded his first career NHL hat trick on November 12, 2010, against Miikka Kiprusoff of the Calgary Flames.

Fiddler signed with the Dallas Stars as a free agent to a three-year contract on July 1, 2011.

On July 2, 2014, after testing free-agency, Fiddler re-signed with the Stars on a two-year contract. During his tenure with the Stars, Fiddler immersed himself amongst the leadership group as an alternate captain.

On February 29, 2016, Fiddler played in his 800th regular season NHL game. Fiddler assisted on Dallas's first goal and later scored the tying goal with 1:31 left in the third period to send the game into overtime. Fiddler and the Stars would go on to lose 3-2 in overtime to the Detroit Red Wings. At the time, Fiddler was one of two active undrafted players who have played in 800 career NHL games, the other being Alexandre Burrows. Fiddler scored his 100th career NHL goal on March 4, 2016, as a member of the Dallas Stars. The empty net goal came in a win against the New Jersey Devils.

On July 1, 2016, after five seasons with the Stars, Fiddler signed a one-year $1.25 million free agent contract with the New Jersey Devils. In the 2016–17 season, Fiddler struggled to find his offensive game as the Devils' fourth-line centre. Having contributed just 3 points in 39 games, he was traded by the Devils, back to the Predators in exchange for a 4th-round pick in the 2017 draft on February 4, 2017.

At the age of 37, Fiddler announced his retirement from the NHL on Wednesday, September 13, 2017 in a Players Tribune article. Fiddler ended his career having played playing a total of 877 games in the NHL with 104 goals and 157 assists, for a total of 261 points.

== Retirement ==
Now retired, Fiddler has moved to Texas with his wife Chrissy and their two children, Blake and Bella. Fiddler is doing charity work with the Stars Foundation and is also helping out the Dallas Stars with any work they ask of him. Fiddler has also helped coach his son's hockey team. For the 2019-20 season, Fiddler was an assistant coach with the Kelowna Rockets, a junior hockey team in the Western Hockey League based in British Columbia, Canada. The Kelowna Rockets hosted the 2019-20 Memorial Cup. Fiddler did not return to the Rockets after the 2020-21 season and moved back to Dallas to spend more time with family.

== Community involvement ==
Throughout his NHL career, Fiddler has been involved with the Leukemia and Lymphoma Society as a way to honour his sister who died from leukemia. He and his wife, Chrissy, created a children's foundation called "Fidd's Kids." Fiddler created the foundation while playing for the Dallas Stars. Through a partnership with the Make-A-Wish Foundation of North Texas, the foundation donates 12 tickets to each home game to local children. In 2015, Fiddler was voted by his teammates as their nominee for the National Hockey League's King Clancy Memorial Trophy. The annual award goes to the player "who best exemplifies leadership qualities on and off the ice and has made a noteworthy humanitarian contribution in his community."

In 2018, Fiddler was named the Man of the Year by the North Texas Chapter of The Leukemia & Lymphoma Society. He and his team raised over $167,000 in a ten-week period for blood cancer research and patient services in memory of his sister, Erin Dionne Fiddler. His sister's name was linked to a national Leukemia & Lymphoma Society research grant.

== Native heritage ==
Fiddler is of Métis descent and, at the time of his retirement, was one of 9 NHL players with Native roots. Fiddler is also one of 70 total Indigenous athletes to ever play in the NHL and is the 13th of Metis descent to play in the NHL. Fiddler is a member of the Métis Museum along with current and former NHL players Arron Asham, Rene Bourque, Brad Chartrand, Ronald Delorme, Magnus Flett, Roderick Flett, Dwight King, Vic Mercredi, Richard Pilon, Wade Redden, Sheldon Souray, and Francis St. Marseille.

== Family ==
Fiddler is the son of Bob. He is married to Chrissy Fiddler and the couple has two children, son Blake, born July 2007 in Nashville, and daughter Bella. Blake was selected 36th overall by the Seattle Kraken in the 2025 NHL entry draft.

== Career statistics ==
			Regular season					Playoffs
Season	Team	League	GP	G	A	Pts	PIM	GP	G	A	Pts	PIM
1997–98	Kelowna Rockets	WHL	65	10	11	21	31	7	0	1	1	4
1998–99	Kelowna Rockets	WHL	68	22	21	43	82	6	2	0	2	8
1999–00	Kelowna Rockets	WHL	64	20	28	48	60	5	1	3	4	4
2000–01	Kelowna Rockets	WHL	3	0	2	2	0	—	—	—	—	—
2000–01	Medicine Hat Tigers	WHL	67	33	38	71	100	—	—	—	—	—
2000–01	Arkansas RiverBlades	ECHL	3	0	1	1	2	5	3	0	3	5
2001–02	Roanoke Express	ECHL	44	27	28	55	71	—	—	—	—	—
2001–02	Norfolk Admirals	AHL	38	8	5	13	28	4	1	3	4	2
2002–03	Milwaukee Admirals	AHL	54	8	16	24	70	6	1	2	3	14
2002–03	Nashville Predators	NHL	19	4	2	6	14	—	—	—	—	—
2003–04	Milwaukee Admirals	AHL	47	9	15	24	72	22	5	3	8	36
2003–04	Nashville Predators	NHL	17	0	0	0	23	—	—	—	—	—
2004–05	Milwaukee Admirals	AHL	73	20	22	42	70	7	0	0	0	18
2005–06	Milwaukee Admirals	AHL	11	1	6	7	20	—	—	—	—	—
2005–06	Nashville Predators	NHL	40	8	4	12	42	2	0	1	1	0
2006–07	Nashville Predators	NHL	72	11	15	26	40	5	1	1	2	4
2007–08	Nashville Predators	NHL	79	11	21	32	47	6	0	0	0	0
2008–09	Nashville Predators	NHL	78	11	6	17	24	—	—	—	—	—
2009–10	Phoenix Coyotes	NHL	76	8	22	30	46	6	1	1	2	14
2010–11	Phoenix Coyotes	NHL	71	6	16	22	46	4	0	0	0	0
2011–12	Dallas Stars	NHL	82	8	13	21	60	—	—	—	—	—
2012–13	Dallas Stars	NHL	46	4	13	17	48	—	—	—	—	—
2013–14	Dallas Stars	NHL	76	6	17	23	37	6	1	2	3	24
2014–15	Dallas Stars	NHL	80	13	16	29	34	—	—	—	—	—
2015–16	Dallas Stars	NHL	82	12	10	22	31	13	1	2	3	8
2016–17	New Jersey Devils	NHL	39	1	2	3	29	—	—	—	—	—
2016–17	Nashville Predators	NHL	20	1	0	1	37	9	1	1	2	25
NHL totals			877	104	157	261	558	51	5	8	13	75

== Awards and honours ==
Award	Year
AHL
Calder Cup (Milwaukee Admirals)	2004
