= Denis Grebeshkov =

Russian ice hockey player (born 1983)

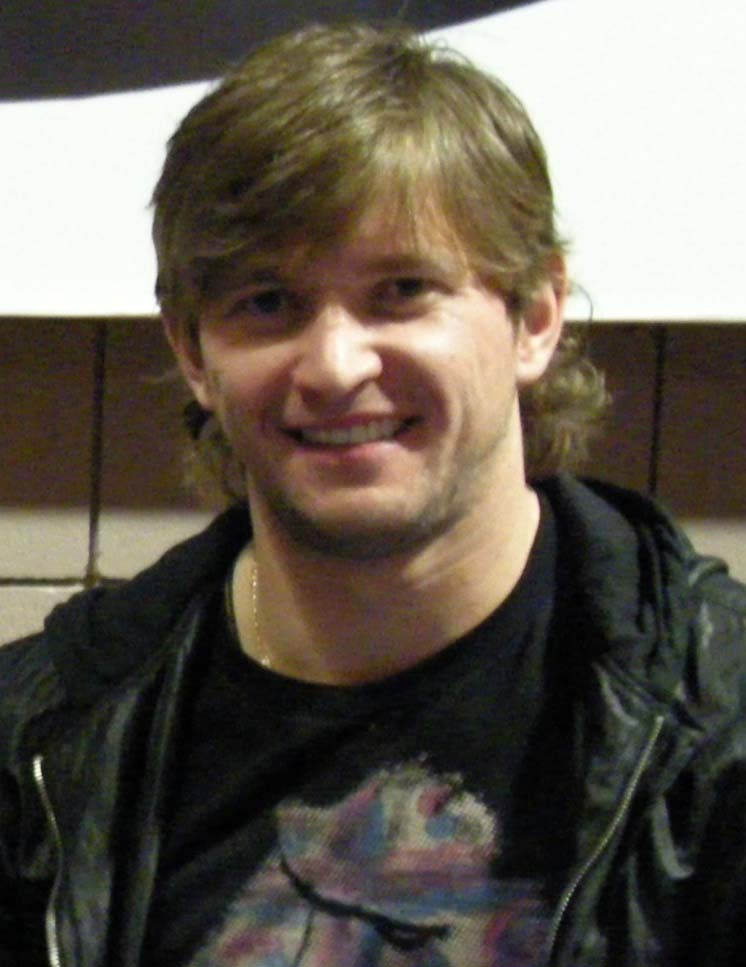
- Grebeshkov in 2009
- Born: October 11, 1983 (age 42) Yaroslavl, Russian SFSR, Soviet Union
- Height: 6 ft 0 in (183 cm)
- Weight: 209 lb (95 kg; 14 st 13 lb)
- Position: Defence
- Shot: Left
- Played for: Lokomotiv Yaroslavl; Los Angeles Kings; New York Islanders; Edmonton Oilers; Nashville Predators; SKA St. Petersburg; HC Yugra; Vityaz Podolsk
- National team: Russia
- NHL draft: 18th overall, 2002; Los Angeles Kings
- Playing career: 2001–2015

Denis Sergeyevich Grebeshkov (Russian: Денис Серге́евич Гребешков; born October 11, 1983) is a Russian former professional ice hockey defenceman who last played for Vityaz Podolsk of the Kontinental Hockey League (KHL). He has previously played in the National Hockey League (NHL) for the Los Angeles Kings, New York Islanders, Edmonton Oilers and Nashville Predators, the former which drafted him in the first round, 18th overall, in the 2002 NHL entry draft.

== Playing career ==
=== Professional ===
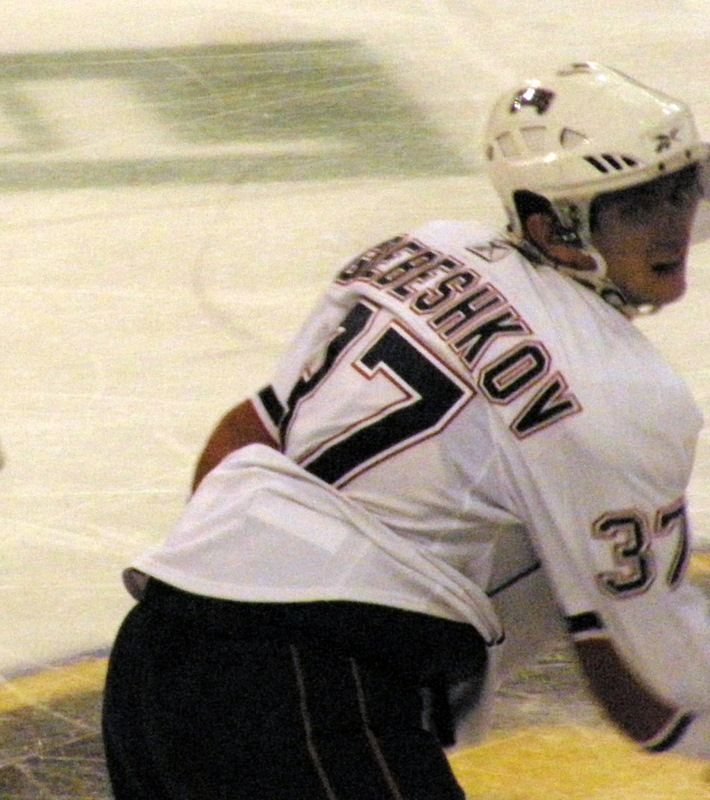
Grebeshkov while with the Oilers in 2009

Grebeshkov was a first-round selection, 18th overall, by the Los Angeles Kings in the 2002 NHL entry draft. He was traded to the New York Islanders on March 8, 2006, along with Jeff Tambellini, in exchange for Mark Parrish and Brent Sopel. Having been unable to come to a contract agreement with the Islanders, Grebeshkov returned to Russia to play with Lokomotiv Yaroslavl for the 2006–07 season.

On February 18, 2007, Grebeshkov's rights were traded to the Edmonton Oilers in exchange for defenceman Marc-André Bergeron and a third-round draft pick in 2008.

On July 1, 2007, the Oilers signed Grebeshkov to a one-year contract. He started the 2007–08 season on the Oilers' roster and played his first Oilers game against the Detroit Red Wings on October 8, 2007. On February 19, 2008, Grebeshkov scored the 8,000th goal in Oilers history in a 5–4 loss to the Nashville Predators.

On July 21, 2009, the Oilers re-signed Grebeshkov to a one-year, $3.15 million contract extension just prior to a scheduled salary arbitration hearing. In the 2009–10 season, Grebeshkov's slow start was exacerbated after he suffered a knee injury during a 3–1 loss to the Buffalo Sabres on November 13, which sidelined him for a month.

On March 1, 2010, the Oilers traded Grebeshkov to the Nashville Predators in exchange for a second-round draft pick in 2010. On March 2, he scored a goal in his Predators debut in a 4–3 win, ironically coming against the Oilers. In just his fourth game with the Predators, Grebeshkov took a shot in the groin against the Vancouver Canucks. Though he continued to play following the blocked shot, he required emergency surgery on one of his testicles following the game, causing him to miss the remainder of the regular season. Grebeshkov was cleared to play prior to Game 2 of the Predators' Western Conference Quarter-final match-up against the Chicago Blackhawks. However, he was a healthy scratch for Games 2, 3 and 4 as Predators head coach Barry Trotz elected to play rookie Cody Franson in his place. Grebeshkov made his Stanley Cup playoff debut in Game 5, registering two assists in the 5–4 Predators loss.

After becoming a free agent on July 1, 2010, Grebeshkov signed a two-year deal with SKA St. Petersburg of the Kontinental Hockey League (KHL), four weeks later. He noted that he wanted to stay in the NHL and received several offers, but the offers he received were for 30% to 40% lower than his 2009–10 salary, and he did not want to take that drastic of a pay cut.

On July 18, 2013, Grebeshkov signed a one-year deal with the Oilers, returning to Edmonton after three years of playing in Russia. Although he made the Oilers’ initial 2013–14 season roster, Grebeshkov ultimately failed to cement a role on the team's blueline, and was subsequently assigned to Edmonton's American Hockey League (AHL) affiliate, the Oklahoma City Barons, for the majority of the season.

On May 14, 2014, Grebeshkov, as a free agent, opted to return to the KHL, signing a contract with Vityaz Podolsk.

== Career statistics ==
=== Regular season and playoffs ===
			Regular season					Playoffs
Season	Team	League	GP	G	A	Pts	PIM	GP	G	A	Pts	PIM
1999–2000	Torpedo–2 Yaroslavl	RUS.3	42	2	1	3	12	—	—	—	—	—
2000–01	Lokomotiv–2 Yaroslavl	RUS.3	34	7	2	9	20	—	—	—	—	—
2001–02	Lokomotiv–2 Yaroslavl	RUS.3	7	1	1	2	2	—	—	—	—	—
2001–02	Lokomotiv Yaroslavl	RSL	27	1	2	3	10	—	—	—	—	—
2002–03	Lokomotiv Yaroslavl	RSL	48	0	7	7	26	10	0	1	1	2
2003–04	Manchester Monarchs	AHL	43	2	7	9	34	6	0	1	1	6
2003–04	Los Angeles Kings	NHL	4	0	1	1	0	—	—	—	—	—
2004–05	Manchester Monarchs	AHL	75	5	44	49	87	6	0	4	4	2
2005–06	Los Angeles Kings	NHL	8	0	2	2	12	—	—	—	—	—
2005–06	Manchester Monarchs	AHL	48	2	25	27	59	—	—	—	—	—
2005–06	New York Islanders	NHL	21	0	3	3	8	—	—	—	—	—
2005–06	Bridgeport Sound Tigers	AHL	—	—	—	—	—	7	1	1	2	8
2006–07	Lokomotiv Yaroslavl	RSL	47	8	8	16	79	7	0	2	2	6
2007–08	Edmonton Oilers	NHL	71	3	15	18	22	—	—	—	—	—
2008–09	Edmonton Oilers	NHL	72	7	32	39	38	—	—	—	—	—
2009–10	Edmonton Oilers	NHL	47	6	13	19	26	—	—	—	—	—
2009–10	Nashville Predators	NHL	4	1	1	2	6	2	0	2	2	0
2010–11	SKA St. Petersburg	KHL	54	8	9	17	44	11	0	5	5	12
2011–12	SKA St. Petersburg	KHL	46	0	8	8	51	6	0	2	2	2
2012–13	SKA St. Petersburg	KHL	14	0	1	1	8	—	—	—	—	—
2012–13	HC Yugra	KHL	30	0	8	8	14	—	—	—	—	—
2013–14	Edmonton Oilers	NHL	7	0	1	1	2	—	—	—	—	—
2013–14	Oklahoma City Barons	AHL	39	2	7	9	20	—	—	—	—	—
2014–15	Vityaz Podolsk	KHL	52	1	10	11	28	—	—	—	—	—
AHL totals			205	11	83	94	200	19	1	6	7	16
NHL totals			234	17	68	85	114	2	0	2	2	0
KHL totals			196	9	36	45	145	17	0	7	7	14

=== International ===
Year	Team	Event	Result	GP	G	A	Pts	PIM
2001	Russia	WJC	7th	7	2	1	3	0
2001	Russia	WJC18	1st place, gold medalist(s)	6	1	3	4	0
2002	Russia	WJC	1st place, gold medalist(s)	7	1	2	3	0
2003	Russia	WJC	1st place, gold medalist(s)	6	0	2	2	6
2007	Russia	WC	3rd place, bronze medalist(s)	9	1	2	3	0
2008	Russia	WC	1st place, gold medalist(s)	9	0	6	6	2
2009	Russia	WC	1st place, gold medalist(s)	9	0	2	2	2
2010	Russia	OG	6th	4	0	1	1	2
2010	Russia	WC	2nd place, silver medalist(s)	9	1	0	1	0
2011	Russia	WC	4th	2	0	0	0	0
Junior totals				26	4	8	12	6
Senior totals				42	2	11	13	6

Preceded by Dave Steckel	Los Angeles Kings first-round draft pick 2002	Succeeded by Dustin Brown
