= Shaun Heshka =

Canadian ice hockey player (born 1985)

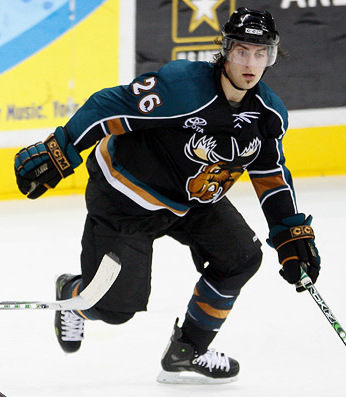
- Heshka with the Manitoba Moose in 2008
- Born: July 30, 1985 (age 40) Melville, Saskatchewan, Canada
- Height: 6 ft 1 in (185 cm)
- Weight: 206 lb (93 kg; 14 st 10 lb)
- Position: Defence
- Shoots: Right
- Liiga team Former teams: Rauman Lukko; Phoenix Coyotes; EC Red Bull Salzburg; Ässät; Ak Bars Kazan; Admiral Vladivostok; Modo Hockey
- NHL draft: Undrafted
- Playing career: 2006–present

Shaun Heshka (born July 30, 1985) is a Canadian professional ice hockey defenceman, who currently plays for Rauman Lukko of the Finnish Liiga.

== Playing career ==
Heshka played his junior years for the Everett Silvertips of the Western Hockey League (WHL). After completing his time with the Silvertips, Heshka was signed by the Vancouver Canucks to a three-year entry-level contract on July 24, 2006. In his professional debut season in 2006–07, Heshka played with the Canucks affiliates, the Manitoba Moose and the Victoria Salmon Kings. Following two productive seasons with the Moose in the American Hockey League, Heshka's rights were traded by the Canucks to the Phoenix Coyotes at the 2009 NHL entry draft on June 27, 2009.

On July 3, 2010, Heshka signed a one-year contract to remain with the Coyotes. Shaun was initially assigned to the Coyotes' AHL affiliate, the San Antonio Rampage, to start the 2009–10 season.

After leading the Rampage defence in scoring, Heshka received his first callup from the Coyotes on November 6, 2009. He made his NHL debut the following night, in a tight game with the Anaheim Ducks on November 7. On November 12, Heshka scored his first career NHL point, an assist on a Paul Bissonnette goal, in a 4-2 defeat to the Montreal Canadiens. After 8 games and 2 assists with the Coyotes, he was then reassigned to the Rampage after a number of Coyotes players returned from injuries.

Unable to reach an agreement or be traded, Heshka was forced to play overseas. He signed with EC Red Bull Salzburg on September 6, 2010. The 25-year-old remained a restricted free agent throughout the 2010–11 season with the Coyotes. He went on to play a critical defensive role in the Red Bulls' spectacular 2011 season, securing his position as a team leader in the overtime championship win in game 7 of the series final.

On November 15, 2012, Heshka signed a two-year contract with Porin Ässät of the Finnish SM-liiga. In the 2012–13 season on April 24, 2013, Heshka won the Finnish Elite League championship with Porin Ässät. He was named to the SM-liiga Allstar team as well as being named the best defenseman in the league (Pekka Rautakallio Award).

On June 18, 2013, Heshka departed Ässät on a mutual release and signed a two-year contract with Ak Bars Kazan of the Russian Kontinental Hockey League. He led the team's defence in scoring and was named to the starting lineup of the KHL Allstar Game for Team East held in Bratalsava. In the midst of his second season with the club under a new head coach in 2014–15, Heshka was traded to Admiral Vladivostok on October 31, 2014.

After playing out the season with Vladivostok, Heshka left the KHL to sign a one-year contract in Sweden with Modo Hockey of the SHL on May 28, 2015.

== Personal life ==
Heshka is married to Laura, and they reside with their children in Winnipeg, Manitoba during the offseason.

== Career statistics ==
			Regular season					Playoffs
Season	Team	League	GP	G	A	Pts	PIM	GP	G	A	Pts	PIM
2001–02	Tisdale Trojans AAA	SMHL	41	7	23	30	44	—	—	—	—	—
2002–03	Melville Millionaires	SJHL	53	6	14	20	53	—	—	—	—	—
2003–04	Everett Silvertips	WHL	66	3	7	10	25	21	0	2	2	8
2004–05	Everett Silvertips	WHL	72	12	26	38	21	11	2	0	2	6
2005–06	Everett Silvertips	WHL	66	10	49	59	91	14	3	10	13	10
2006–07	Manitoba Moose	AHL	57	2	4	6	14	7	0	0	0	8
2006–07	Victoria Salmon Kings	ECHL	3	0	1	1	4	—	—	—	—	—
2007–08	Manitoba Moose	AHL	77	9	21	30	59	6	0	1	1	4
2008–09	Manitoba Moose	AHL	77	3	23	26	25	22	0	5	5	12
2009–10	San Antonio Rampage	AHL	73	7	26	33	34	—	—	—	—	—
2009–10	Phoenix Coyotes	NHL	8	0	2	2	4	—	—	—	—	—
2010–11	EC Red Bull Salzburg	EBEL	50	6	18	24	32	18	3	7	10	14
2011–12	Binghamton Senators	AHL	10	0	1	1	6	—	—	—	—	—
2011–12	Peoria Rivermen	AHL	60	4	14	18	12	—	—	—	—	—
2012–13	Ässät	SM-l	60	8	23	31	26	16	1	7	8	6
2013–14	Ak Bars Kazan	KHL	54	8	22	30	34	6	1	2	3	2
2014–15	Ak Bars Kazan	KHL	22	1	5	6	8	—	—	—	—	—
2014–15	Admiral Vladivostok	KHL	35	2	11	13	14	—	—	—	—	—
2015–16	MODO Hockey	SHL	50	1	9	10	14	—	—	—	—	—
2016–17	Kärpät	Liiga	58	8	24	32	24	2	0	0	0	2
2017–18	Kärpät	Liiga	52	10	18	28	57	18	4	5	9	8
2018–19	Kärpät	Liiga	52	8	20	28	20	17	1	5	6	6
2019–20	Kärpät	Liiga	51	5	24	29	10	—	—	—	—	—
2020–21	Kärpät	Liiga	41	2	16	18	16	5	0	3	3	4
AHL totals			354	25	89	114	150	35	0	6	6	24
NHL totals			8	0	2	2	4	—	—	—	—	—
Liiga totals			314	41	125	166	153	58	6	20	26	26

== Awards and honours ==
Award	Year
WHL
West First All-Star Team	2006
