= 2009–10 Calgary Flames season =

NHL team season

2009–10 Calgary Flames
- Division: 3rd Northwest
- Conference: 9th Western
- 2009–10 record: 40–32–10
- Home record: 21–16–4
- Road record: 19–16–6
- Goals for: 204
- Goals against: 210

Team information
- General manager: Darryl Sutter
- Coach: Brent Sutter
- Captain: Jarome Iginla
- Alternate captains: Robyn Regehr; Rotated monthly: Dion Phaneuf; Daymond Langkow; Craig Conroy; Jay Bouwmeester; Cory Sarich; Olli Jokinen
- Arena: Pengrowth Saddledome
- Average attendance: 19,289 (100.0%); Total: 790,849

Team leaders
- Goals: Jarome Iginla (32)
- Assists: Jarome Iginla (37)
- Points: Jarome Iginla (69)
- Penalty minutes: Brandon Prust (98)
- Plus/minus: Mark Giordano (+17)
- Wins: Miikka Kiprusoff (35)
- Goals against average: Miikka Kiprusoff (2.31)

The 2009–10 Calgary Flames season was the 30th season for the Calgary Flames, and the 38th for the Flames franchise in the National Hockey League (NHL). The Flames entered the season with a new head coach as Brent Sutter replaced Mike Keenan. The year opened with the 2009 NHL entry draft on June 26–27, as the Flames selected defenceman Tim Erixon with their first selection. 2009 also marked the debut of the Flames' new American Hockey League affiliate, the Abbotsford Heat, as the franchise has relocated from the Quad Cities to the British Columbia city.

While the Flames led the Northwest Division early in the season, an extended slump left them in the eighth and final playoff position by the Olympic break. As a result, general manager Darryl Sutter completed several trades in a bid to improve the team's fortunes. Dion Phaneuf was one of seven roster players sent to other teams between January 31 and the March 3 trade deadline. The 2010 Winter Olympic tournament interrupted the season during February. Jarome Iginla won his second Olympic gold medal with Team Canada, while Miikka Kiprusoff and Niklas Hagman won bronze medals with the Finnish team. Iginla and Daymond Langkow each played their 1,000th games in February.

The Flames continued to struggle after the Olympic break; they finished the season in ninth place in the West and missed the playoffs for the first time since 2003. The result was disappointing for the organization, and led to media and fan speculation regarding the futures of Sutter and Iginla in Calgary.

== Pre-season ==
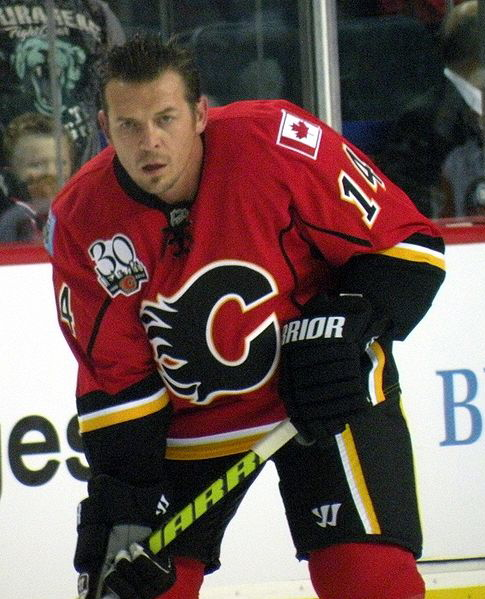
Theoren Fleury attempted an NHL comeback at the age of 41.

The Flames entered the 2009–10 campaign with a new head coach after Brent Sutter was named the 18th coach in franchise history. His assistants were promoted from within the organization: former Quad City Flames coach Ryan McGill and Calgary Hitmen coach Dave Lowry joined Sutter's staff along with former player Jamie McLennan, who became the team's new goaltender coach. Sutter had spent the previous two seasons as the coach of the New Jersey Devils, but resigned the position over a desire to return closer to his home in Red Deer, Alberta. He joined his brother Darryl, who remained the Flames' general manager.

Preceding the release of the season schedule, rampant speculation that the Flames were in negotiations to host a second outdoor game for the 2010 NHL Winter Classic were confirmed. The additional game, suggested by the Canadian Broadcasting Corporation, would have taken place at McMahon Stadium, though negotiations were not successful and the league scheduled only one outdoor game for New Year's Day.

Training camp had been dominated by the comeback attempt of Theoren Fleury at age 41. Fleury had last played in the NHL in 2003 as a member of the Chicago Blackhawks before his career was halted by drug and alcohol addictions. Fleury, who had been under NHL suspension over his addictions since he last played, was reinstated by the league prior to the opening of camp and subsequently signed a tryout offer. He appeared in the Flames' second pre-season game, against the New York Islanders, drawing a loud ovation from the fans. He scored the only shootout goal to lead the Flames to a 5–4 victory before acknowledging the Saddledome crowd as it chanted "Theo! Theo! Theo!"

Fleury played four exhibition games, scoring four points, before being released by the Flames. General manager Darryl Sutter expressed his pride in Fleury's attempt and commended his effort, but decided he was not one of the top six wingers in camp, which Sutter and Fleury had agreed was a condition of the tryout continuing. On September 28, 2009, Fleury announced his retirement. He thanked the Flames for allowing him to attempt the comeback, and expressed satisfaction at how his career ended.

The game against the Islanders also featured a devastating open-ice hit by Dion Phaneuf on New York's Kyle Okposo that saw the young forward taken off on a stretcher and sent to hospital with a concussion. The hit led Pascal Morency to leave his team's bench to engage Phaneuf as a melee broke out in the aftermath of the check. The league reviewed the incident and suspended Morency ten games for leaving the bench.

2009 pre-season game log: 3–2–2 (Home: 2–1–1; Road: 1–0–1; Neutral 0–1–0)
#	Date	Visitor	Score	Home	OT	Decision	Attendance	Record
1	September 15	Edmonton	4 – 1	Calgary		Keetley	19,289	0–1–0
2	September 17	NY Islanders	4 – 5	Calgary	SO	Shantz	19,289	1–1–0
3	September 19 (at Saskatoon, SK)	Calgary	2 – 4	NY Islanders		McElhinney	12,833	1–2–0
4	September 20	Florida	2 – 5	Calgary		Kiprusoff	19,289	2–2–0
5	September 21	Calgary	4 – 5	Vancouver	SO	McElhinney	18,630	2–2–1
6	September 23	Calgary	5 – 3	Edmonton		Kiprusoff	16,839	3–2–1
7	September 26	Vancouver	2 – 1	Calgary	SO	Kiprusoff	19,289	3–2–2
Legend: Win Loss Overtime/shootout loss

== Regular season ==
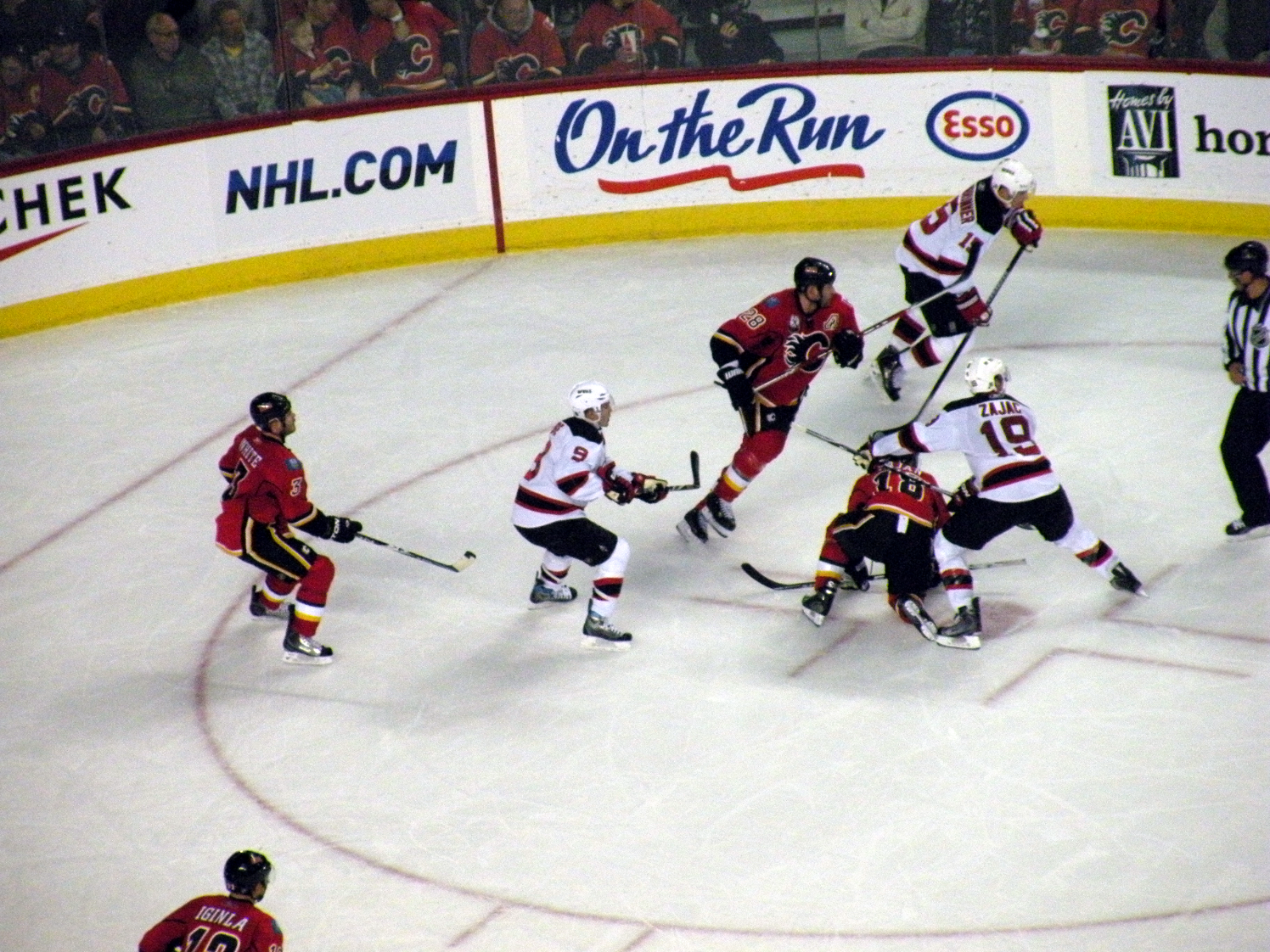
The Flames against the New Jersey Devils. Calgary won 5–3.

The Flames were expected to battle the Vancouver Canucks for top spot in the Northwest Division. The two teams met to open the season, a 5–3 victory for Calgary. It was the first time Calgary won a season opening game in seven years, and only the second since 1993. The Flames won their next three, including two against their arch-rivals, the Edmonton Oilers to open the season at 4–0 for the first time since 1993–94. Following a loss to the Dallas Stars, the Flames faced the Chicago Blackhawks, and after scoring five goals in just five minutes, 29 seconds in the first period, went on to give up six consecutive goals to lose the game 6–5 in overtime. The six-goal outburst by Chicago tied an NHL record for the largest comeback in league history. Despite a 4–1–1 start to the season, the loss prompted coach Sutter to question the players' mental toughness. Although they felt they were not playing up to their expectations, the Flames tied a franchise record for the best start to the season, going 7–2–1 after ten games.

The Flames were embroiled in a national controversy in early November after it was revealed the team had secured a private clinic from Alberta Health Services (AHS) to have all players and their families inoculated against the H1N1 flu pandemic at the same time as many Albertans were growing increasingly frustrated with how the province was running public clinics. The controversy polarized the public and the media, even within individual newspapers. The Calgary Sun's Michael Platt accused the "millionaire hockey players" of taking vaccinations from "shivering children", while Eric Francis defended the club by pointing to the millions of dollars and hundreds of hours of volunteer time the team gives to the medical community. The Flames defended their actions, stating they completed an agreement with AHS prior to the Alberta government's controversial clinics opening and arguing that they did so at a time when the government was encouraging all Albertans to get the vaccinations. AHS responded to the controversy by firing two people, including the most senior staff member involved in permitting the private clinic to go ahead.

Coincidentally, goaltender Miikka Kiprusoff was sidelined by what was suspected to be the flu on the same night the controversy broke. Backup Curtis McElhinney was a surprise starter against the Dallas Stars, and responded with a 38 save performance in a 3–2 overtime victory. The victory ended a two-game losing streak that again led Sutter to criticize the efforts of his team, especially captain Jarome Iginla, and prompted the coach to put the players through an intense practice session prior to the game in Dallas. Kiprusoff surrendered only two goals in the Flames next three games as Calgary opened November with four consecutive wins, including a 1–0 shutout in Montreal against the Canadiens that was his 200th win as a Flame.

In spite of losing Curtis Glencross to a three-game suspension in early November, and suffering an embarrassing 7–1 loss at home to the Blackhawks in which leading scorer Rene Bourque suffered an undisclosed injury, the Flames continued their torrid pace through November. Calgary moved past the Colorado Avalanche, into the division lead late in the month following a 3–0 shutout victory over the Detroit Red Wings. Victories over the Columbus Blue Jackets and Nashville Predators saw the Flames finish the month of November with a 10–2–2 record and tie a franchise record for points in consecutive road games at ten. Jarome Iginla led the Flames offensively in the month, recording 13 goals and 20 points in 12 games and was named the first star of the month of November.

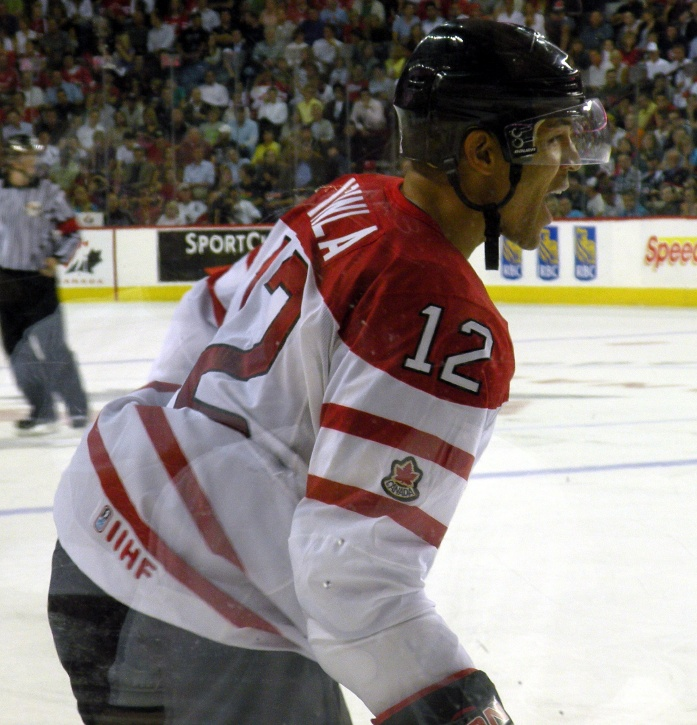
Jarome Iginla won a gold medal with Team Canada at the 2010 Olympics.

The Flames struggled in December, losing six of seven games during one stretch in the middle of the month that was punctuated with a 5–1 loss on home ice to the Canucks that the players described as embarrassing and which briefly dropped the Flames to eighth place in the Western Conference. The loss to Vancouver also began the busiest part of the schedule for the Flames, who ended 2009 in the middle of a five game in seven night stretch and nine games in two weeks. The Flames entered the new year on a three-game winning streak that included two more victories over the Oilers, and were looking forward to putting their disappointing month of December behind them.

Rosters for the 2010 Winter Olympics were announced in December. Olli Jokinen joined Kiprusoff in being named to the Finnish team, while Jarome Iginla was named an alternate captain for Team Canada. Dion Phaneuf, Jay Bouwmeester and Robyn Regehr, whom all attended the summer Olympic camp, were left off the Canadian roster. Jokinen felt that the teams poor December played a role in their being left off, and expressed that the team felt they let the three defencemen down as a result. At the Olympic tournament, Iginla led the tournament with five goals, and assisted on Sidney Crosby's overtime winning goal in the gold medal final against the United States. Kiprusoff, along with Niklas Hagman, who was acquired from Toronto before the Games, both won bronze medals.

Two wins to begin January extended the Flames' winning streak to five games. An extended scoring slump led the team to struggle for the rest of the month, culminating in a nine-game losing streak; the longest the team has endured since an 11-game losing streak in 1985–86. The Flames finally ended the skid with a 6–1 victory, led by Iginla's four points and Gordie Howe hat trick, over the Oilers, who had their own losing streak extended to 13 games. In doing so, the Flames won all six games against Edmonton, the first time either team has swept the other in the 30-year history of the rivalry. The following day, on January 31, Darryl Sutter completed a seven player trade with the Toronto Maple Leafs that saw Dion Phaneuf sent to Toronto. Olli Jokinen and Brandon Prust were then sent to the New York Rangers for Ales Kotalik and Chris Higgins a day later in a trade that was first rumoured the evening before but was delayed so that Jokinen and Prust could play with the Flames against the Philadelphia Flyers.

Three losses in four games, capped by a 5–0 defeat against the Boston Bruins on March 27 left the Flames six points out of the eighth and final playoff spot with seven games remaining. The team also lost second-line centre Daymond Langkow after he was taken off the ice on a stretcher in Minnesota after being struck in the back of the neck by a slapshot. However, a 5–3 road victory against the Eastern Conference leading Washington Capitals and a 2–1 home win against the Phoenix Coyotes, coupled with the Colorado Avalanche losing six of their final seven games to end the month of March, left the Flames two points behind the Avalanche heading into April.

The Flames struggled on the power play, finishing 30th overall in power-play goals, with 43. They did, however, tie the Detroit Red Wings for the fewest shorthanded goals allowed, with just 1.

2009–10 game log

October: 7–4–1 (Home: 5–3–0; Road: 2–1–1)
#	Date	Visitor	Score	Home	OT	Decision	Attendance	Record	Pts
1	October 1	Vancouver	3 – 5	Calgary		Kiprusoff	19,289	1–0–0	2
2	October 3	Calgary	4 – 3	Edmonton		Kiprusoff	16,839	2–0–0	4
3	October 6	Montreal	3 – 4	Calgary		Kiprusoff	19,289	3–0–0	6
4	October 8	Calgary	4 – 3	Edmonton	SO	Kiprusoff	16,839	4–0–0	8
5	October 9	Dallas	5 – 2	Calgary		McElhinney	19,289	4–1–0	8
6	October 12	Calgary	5 – 6	Chicago	OT	Kiprusoff	20,074	4–1–1	9
7	October 13	Calgary	1 – 2	Columbus		Kiprusoff	13,280	4–2–1	9
8	October 16	Vancouver	3 – 5	Calgary		Kiprusoff	19,289	5–2–1	11
9	October 20	Columbus	3 – 6	Calgary		Kiprusoff	19,289	6–2–1	13
10	October 24	Edmonton	2 – 5	Calgary		Kiprusoff	19,289	7–2–1	15
11	October 28	Colorado	3 – 2	Calgary		Kiprusoff	19,289	7–3–1	15
12	October 31	Detroit	3 – 1	Calgary		Kiprusoff	19,289	7–4–1	15

November: 10–2–2 (Home: 2–2–0; Road: 8–0–2)
#	Date	Visitor	Score	Home	OT	Decision	Attendance	Record	Pts
13	November 4	Calgary	3 – 2	Dallas	OT	McElhinney	16,369	8–4–1	17
14	November 5	Calgary	2 – 1	St. Louis	OT	Kiprusoff	17,559	9–4–1	19
15	November 7	NY Rangers	1 – 3	Calgary		Kiprusoff	19,289	10–4–1	21
16	November 10	Calgary	1 – 0	Montreal		Kiprusoff	21,273	11–4–1	23
17	November 13	Calgary	1 – 2	Buffalo	SO	Kiprusoff	18,690	11–4–2	24
18	November 14	Calgary	5 – 2	Toronto		Kiprusoff	19,316	12–4–2	26
19	November 17	Colorado	3 – 2	Calgary		Kiprusoff	19,289	12–5–2	26
20	November 19	Chicago	7 – 1	Calgary		Kiprusoff	19,289	12–6–2	26
21	November 21	Calgary	5 – 2	Los Angeles		Kiprusoff	16,336	13–6–2	28
22	November 23	Calgary	2 – 3	Anaheim	SO	Kiprusoff	15,348	13–6–3	29
23	November 25	Phoenix	1 – 2	Calgary		Kiprusoff	19,289	14–6–3	31
24	November 27	Calgary	3 – 0	Detroit		Kiprusoff	20,066	15–6–3	33
25	November 28	Calgary	4 – 3	Columbus	SO	McElhinney	17,772	16–6–3	35
26	November 30	Calgary	5 – 0	Nashville		Kiprusoff	10,581	17–6–3	37

December: 6–6–2 (Home: 4–2–2; Road: 2–4–0)
#	Date	Visitor	Score	Home	OT	Decision	Attendance	Record	Pts
27	December 3	Calgary	1 – 2	Phoenix		Kiprusoff	9,868	17–7–3	37
28	December 5	Calgary	2 – 1	San Jose		Kiprusoff	17,562	18–7–3	39
29	December 7	Calgary	1 – 2	Los Angeles		Kiprusoff	13,853	18–8–3	39
30	December 9	Atlanta	1 – 3	Calgary		Kiprusoff	19,289	19–8–3	41
31	December 11	Minnesota	2 – 1	Calgary	OT	Kiprusoff	19,289	19–8–4	42
32	December 13	Calgary	2 – 3	Colorado		Kiprusoff	11,448	19–9–4	42
33	December 15	Calgary	3 – 4	St. Louis		McElhinney	19,150	19–10–4	42
34	December 17	Los Angeles	1 – 2	Calgary		Kiprusoff	19,289	20–10–4	44
35	December 19	Nashville	5 – 3	Calgary		Kiprusoff	19,289	20–11–4	44
36	December 23	St. Louis	2 – 1	Calgary	SO	Kiprusoff	19,289	20–11–5	45
37	December 27	Vancouver	5 – 1	Calgary		Kiprusoff	19,289	20–12–5	45
38	December 28	Calgary	4 – 1	Edmonton		Kiprusoff	16,839	21–12–5	47
39	December 30	Los Angeles	1 – 2	Calgary		Kiprusoff	19,289	22–12–5	49
40	December 31	Edmonton	1 – 2	Calgary		McElhinney	19,289	23–12–5	51

January: 4–8–3 (Home: 2–5–1; Road: 2–3–2)
#	Date	Visitor	Score	Home	OT	Decision	Attendance	Record	Pts
41	January 2	Toronto	1 – 3	Calgary		Kiprusoff	19,289	24–12–5	53
42	January 5	Calgary	3 – 1	Nashville		Kiprusoff	15,030	25–12–5	55
43	January 6	Calgary	1 – 4	Minnesota		Kiprusoff	18,137	25–13–5	55
44	January 8	Columbus	3 – 2	Calgary		McElhinney	19,289	25–14–5	55
45	January 9	Calgary	3 – 2	Vancouver	SO	Kiprusoff	18,810	26–14–5	57
46	January 11	Colorado	3 – 2	Calgary	SO	Kiprusoff	19,289	26–14–6	58
47	January 13	Pittsburgh	3 – 1	Calgary		Kiprusoff	19,289	26–15–6	58
48	January 15	Nashville	1 – 0	Calgary		Kiprusoff	19,289	26–16–6	58
49	January 17	Calgary	4 – 5	Anaheim		McElhinney	16,153	26–17–6	58
50	January 18	Calgary	1 – 9	San Jose		Kiprusoff	17,562	26–18–6	58
51	January 21	Chicago	3 – 1	Calgary		Kiprusoff	19,289	26–19–6	58
52	January 25	St. Louis	2 – 0	Calgary		Kiprusoff	19,289	26–20–6	58
53	January 27	Calgary	3 – 4	Dallas	SO	Kiprusoff	16,807	26–20–7	59
54	January 28	Calgary	2 – 3	Phoenix	SO	Kiprusoff	12,725	26–20–8	60
55	January 30	Edmonton	1 – 6	Calgary		Kiprusoff	19,289	27–20–8	62

February: 3–3–1 (Home: 2–2–0; Road: 1–1–1)
#	Date	Visitor	Score	Home	OT	Decision	Attendance	Record	Pts
56	February 1	Philadelphia	3 – 0	Calgary		Kiprusoff	19,289	27–21–8	62
57	February 3	Carolina	1 – 4	Calgary		Kiprusoff	19,289	28–21–8	64
58	February 5	Calgary	2 – 1	Florida		Kiprusoff	16,781	29–21–8	66
59	February 6	Calgary	1 – 2	Tampa Bay	OT	Kiprusoff	15,859	29–21–9	67
60	February 9	Calgary	2 – 3	Ottawa		Kiprusoff	18,682	29–22–9	67
61	February 11	Dallas	3 – 1	Calgary		Kiprusoff	19,289	29–23–9	67
62	February 13	Anaheim	1 – 3	Calgary		Kiprusoff	19,289	30–23–9	69

March: 9–6–0 (Home: 5–2–0; Road: 4–4–0)
#	Date	Visitor	Score	Home	OT	Decision	Attendance	Record	Pts
63	March 3	Minnesota	4 – 0	Calgary		Kiprusoff	19,289	30–24–9	69
64	March 5	New Jersey	3 – 5	Calgary		Kiprusoff	19,289	31–24–9	71
65	March 7	Calgary	5 – 2	Minnesota		Toskala	18,217	32–24–9	73
66	March 9	Calgary	4 – 2	Detroit		Kiprusoff	20,066	33–24–9	75
67	March 11	Ottawa	0 – 2	Calgary		Kiprusoff	19,289	34–24–9	77
68	March 14	Calgary	1 – 3	Vancouver		Kiprusoff	18,810	34–25–9	77
69	March 15	Detroit	2 – 1	Calgary		Kiprusoff	19,289	34–26–9	77
70	March 17	Calgary	3 – 2	Colorado		Toskala	12,770	35–26–9	79
71	March 19	San Jose	3 – 4	Calgary		Kiprusoff	19,289	36–26–9	81
72	March 21	Calgary	3 – 4	Minnesota		Kiprusoff	18,411	36–27–9	81
73	March 23	Anaheim	1 – 3	Calgary		Kiprusoff	19,289	37–27–9	83
74	March 25	Calgary	2 – 3	NY Islanders		Kiprusoff	12,817	37–28–9	83
75	March 27	Calgary	0 – 5	Boston		Kiprusoff	17,565	37–29–9	83
76	March 28	Calgary	5 – 3	Washington		Kiprusoff	18,277	38–29–9	85
77	March 31	Phoenix	1 – 2	Calgary		Kiprusoff	19,289	39–29–9	87

April: 1–3–1 (Home: 0–1–1; Road: 1–2–0)
#	Date	Visitor	Score	Home	OT	Decision	Attendance	Record	Pts
78	April 2	Calgary	2 – 1	Colorado		Kiprusoff	18,007	40–29–9	89
79	April 4	Calgary	1 – 4	Chicago		Kiprusoff	21,537	40–30–9	89
80	April 6	San Jose	2 – 1	Calgary		Kiprusoff	19,289	40–31–9	89
81	April 8	Minnesota	2 – 1	Calgary	SO	Kiprusoff	19,289	40–31–10	90
82	April 10	Calgary	3 – 7	Vancouver		Kiprusoff	18,810	40–32–10	90

Legend: Win (2 points) Loss (0 points) Overtime/shootout loss (1 point)

== Playoffs ==
Consecutive losses to Chicago and San Jose, coupled with two victories by Colorado eliminated the Flames from playoff contention in the final week of the season. The Flames failed to qualify for the post season for the first time since 2003. Flames players lamented their inability to score goals at key times as a primary reason for the team's failure. The dismal result for the Flames led fans and media to question whether the team needed to make significant changes in the off-season. The future of general manager Darryl Sutter with the team was called into question, while many wondered if it was time to part ways with captain Jarome Iginla, who had been with the team since 1996. For his part, Iginla accepted responsibility for the failed season, and said he did not wish to leave Calgary, wanting instead to lead the Flames into a rebound season in 2010–11. When pressed by the media, he stated he would be willing to waive his no movement clause if the team asked him to, though Flames management dismissed speculation that they would consider dealing the team's captain.

With the Flames out of the playoffs, several players were invited to represent their national teams at the 2010 IIHF World Championship in Germany. Rene Bourque and Mark Giordano played for Team Canada, while Eric Nystrom and David Moss joined Team USA. Mikael Backlund joined the Swedish team after the Abbotsford Heat were eliminated from the American Hockey League playoffs and won a bronze medal.

== Player statistics ==
=== Skaters ===
Note: GP = Games played; G = Goals; A = Assists; Pts = Points; +/− = Plus/minus; PIM = Penalty minutes

Regular season

Player	GP	G	A	Pts	+/−	PIM
Jarome Iginla	82	32	37	69	−2	58
Rene Bourque	73	27	31	58	7	88
Daymond Langkow	72	14	23	37	2	30
Olli Jokinen^{‡}	56	11	24	35	2	53
Curtis Glencross	67	15	18	33	11	58
Nigel Dawes	66	14	18	32	1	18
Mark Giordano	82	11	19	30	17	81
Jay Bouwmeester	82	3	26	29	−4	48
Dion Phaneuf^{‡}	55	10	12	22	3	49
Eric Nystrom	82	11	8	19	E	54
Dustin Boyd^{‡}	60	8	11	19	5	15
David Moss	64	8	9	17	−9	20
Robyn Regehr	81	2	15	17	2	80
Matt Stajan^{†}	27	3	13	16	−3	2
Craig Conroy	63	3	12	15	−6	25
Ian White^{†}	27	4	8	12	7	12
Niklas Hagman^{†}	27	5	6	11	−1	2
Mikael Backlund	23	1	9	10	5	6
Jamie Lundmark^{‡}	21	4	5	9	−6	4
Adam Pardy	57	2	7	9	−3	46
Jamal Mayers^{†}	27	1	5	6	2	53
Fredrik Sjostrom^{‡}	46	1	5	6	2	8
Cory Sarich	57	1	5	6	4	58
Ales Kotalik^{†}	26	3	2	5	1	29
Brandon Prust^{‡}	43	1	4	5	6	98
Brian McGrattan	34	1	3	4	3	86
Chris Higgins^{†}	12	2	1	3	0	0
Staffan Kronwall	11	1	2	3	−1	2
Steve Staios^{†}	18	1	2	3	−8	16
Aaron Johnson^{‡}	22	1	2	3	0	19
Jason Jaffray	3	0	0	0	−1	0
Brett Sutter	10	0	0	0	−1	5

=== Goaltenders ===
Note: GP = Games played; TOI = Time on ice (minutes); W = Wins; L = Losses; OT = Overtime losses; GA = Goals against; GAA= Goals against average; SA= Shots against; SV= Saves; Sv% = Save percentage; SO= Shutouts

Regular season

Player	GP	TOI	W	L	OT	GA	GAA	SA	Sv%	SO	G	A	PIM
Miikka Kiprusoff	73	4235	35	28	9	163	2.31	1872	.920	4	0	0	4
Curtis McElhinney^{‡}	10	502	3	4	0	27	3.23	235	.885	0	0	0	0
Vesa Toskala^{†}	6	212	2	0	0	8	2.27	89	.918	0	0	0	0

^{†}Denotes player spent time with another team before joining Flames. Stats reflect time with the Flames only.
^{‡}Traded mid-season
Bold/italics denotes franchise record

== Awards and honours ==
Brett Hull, selected by the Flames 114th overall at the 1984 NHL entry draft, was elected to the Hockey Hall of Fame in 2009. Hull Scored 741 goals during his 19-year career, the third highest total in NHL history. During the season, Iginla and Langkow reached significant career milestones on consecutive nights as they played their 1,000th career games in the NHL. Both players made their debut in the 1995–96 season and were both opponents during their Western Hockey League careers and teammates at the 1996 World Junior Ice Hockey Championships. The Flames presented the pair with silver sticks at a joint ceremony to honour them for their achievement.

=== Awards ===
League awards
Player	Award
Jarome Iginla	First Star of the Week (November 3–9)
Jarome Iginla	First Star of the Month (November)
Team awards
Miikka Kiprusoff	Molson Cup
Craig Conroy	Ralph T. Scurfield Humanitarian Award
Daymond Langkow	J. R. "Bud" McCaig Award

=== Milestones ===
Player	Milestone	Reached
Staffan Kronwall	1st NHL goal	October 6, 2009
Mikael Backlund	1st NHL goal 1st NHL point	January 28, 2010
Jarome Iginla	900th NHL point	January 30, 2010
Jarome Iginla	1000th NHL game	February 5, 2010
Daymond Langkow	1000th NHL game	February 6, 2010

== Transactions ==
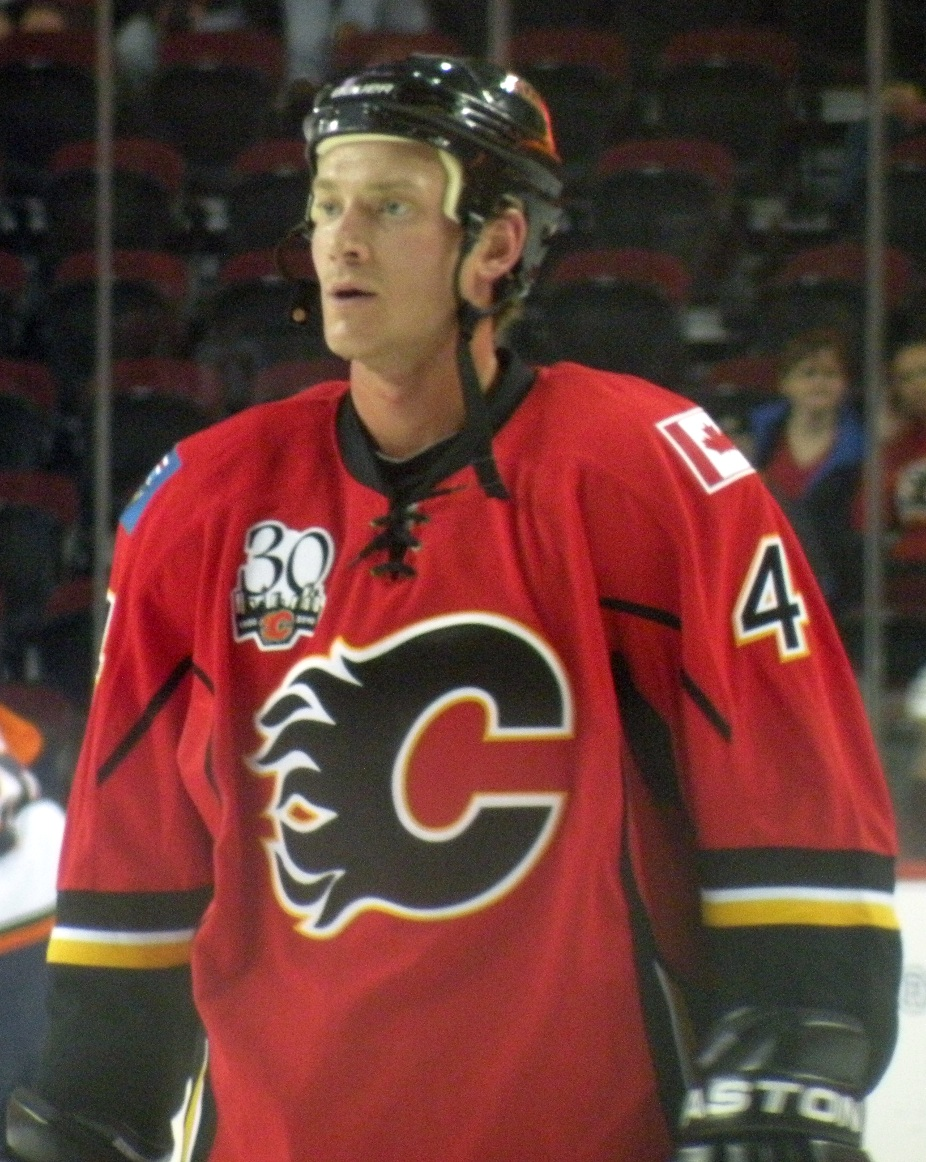
Jay Bouwmeester bypassed free agency, choosing to sign a five-year contract with the Flames.

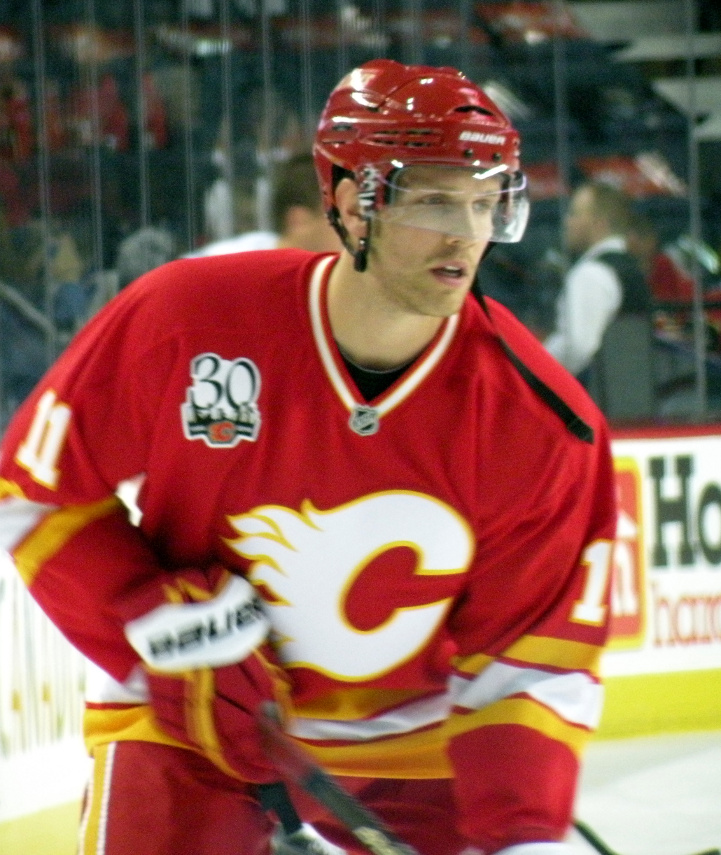
Signed as a free agent, Fredrik Sjostrom was dealt to the Toronto Maple Leafs before completing his first season in Calgary.

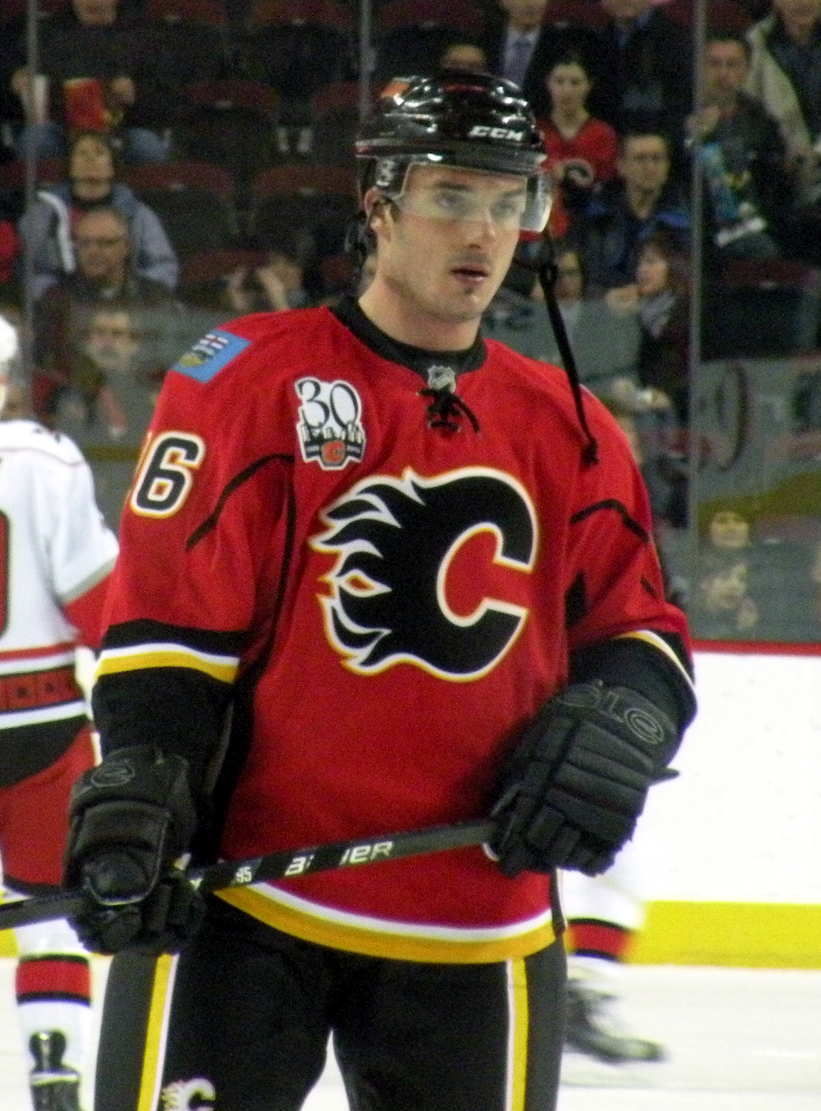
Ales Kotalik was one of seven players brought in by Calgary as part of two high-profile trades before the Olympic break.

The Flames completed several trades during the 2009 NHL entry draft. They first gained an additional third-round selection from the New Jersey Devils for agreeing to swap first-round picks. The Flames moved down to the 23rd overall pick and gave the Devils the 20th overall selection. Calgary followed that up by dealing a third-round pick to the Florida Panthers, along with the negotiating rights of Free agent defenceman Jordan Leopold in exchange for the negotiating rights of defenceman Jay Bouwmeester. The move proved successful, as Bouwmeester agreed to a five-year contract less than a day before he would have become an unrestricted free agent.

Having already signed Bouwmeester, the Flames were relatively quiet in the first days of the free agent signing period. The team signed a quartet of players in Fredrik Sjostrom, Garth Murray, Riley Armstrong and Staffan Kronwall. They lost team leading scorer Michael Cammalleri after he signed a five-year, $30 million contract with the Montreal Canadiens. Adrian Aucoin also moved on, signing with the Phoenix Coyotes. The team was able to retain defenceman Adam Pardy, as he signed a two-year deal to remain in Calgary.

Darryl Sutter engineered a seven player trade at the end of January that sent Dion Phaneuf and Fredrik Sjostrom to the Toronto Maple Leafs in exchange for four players led by Matt Stajan, Ian White and Niklas Hagman. The deal ended weeks of speculation about the Calgary defenceman's future amid reports that Phaneuf had requested a trade – a claim he had denied. One day later, the Flames sent Olli Jokinen and Brandon Prust to the New York Rangers in exchange for Ales Kotalik and Chris Higgins. The deals resulted in the change of over one third of the roster in the period of a day, moves that were seen as a sign of panic as the Flames hovered around the final playoff spot. While rumours circulated that Phaneuf was dealt because he was a divisive influence in the locker room, Jokinen later blamed the fans in Calgary for the defenceman's departure. Jokinen admitted that he was traded because he failed to produce in Calgary, while in Kotalik, the Flames received a player who was having a similarly disappointing season in New York.

The Flames completed three trades at the March 3 deadline. They first sent backup goaltender Curtis McElhinney to the Anaheim Ducks in exchange for Vesa Toskala, who became Kiprusoff's backup. They then sent forward Dustin Boyd to the Nashville Predators in exchange for a draft pick. Despite showing potential at times, the 23-year-old Boyd had failed to live up to the expectations placed on him in Calgary. The day ended with a minor, but historic, trade that saw Aaron Johnson sent to the Edmonton Oilers along with a draft pick, for fellow defenceman Steve Staios. The deal marked the first time in the 30-year history of the Battle of Alberta that the two organizations completed a trade with each other.

=== Trades ===
June 26, 2009	To Calgary Flames 1st-round pick (23rd overall) in 2009; 3rd-round pick (84th overall) in 2009	To New Jersey Devils 1st-round pick (20th overall) in 2009
June 27, 2009	To Calgary Flames Jay Bouwmeester	To Florida Panthers Jordan Leopold; 3rd-round pick (67th overall) in 2009
June 27, 2009	To Calgary Flames 3rd-round pick (74th overall) in 2009	To Los Angeles Kings 3rd-round pick (84th overall) in 2009; 4th-round pick (107th overall) in 2009
June 27, 2009	To Calgary Flames Brandon Prust	To Phoenix Coyotes Jim Vandermeer
July 17, 2009	To Calgary Flames Keith Seabrook	To Washington Capitals Future considerations
July 27, 2009	To Calgary Flames Anton Stralman; Colin Stuart; 7th-round pick in 2012	To Toronto Maple Leafs Wayne Primeau; 2nd-round pick in 2011
September 28, 2009	To Calgary Flames 3rd-round pick in 2010	To Columbus Blue Jackets Anton Stralman
October 7, 2009	To Calgary Flames Aaron Johnson	To Chicago Blackhawks Kyle Greentree
January 31, 2010	To Calgary Flames Matt Stajan; Niklas Hagman; Jamal Mayers; Ian White	To Toronto Maple Leafs Dion Phaneuf; Fredrik Sjostrom; Keith Aulie
February 1, 2010	To Calgary Flames Chris Higgins; Ales Kotalik	To New York Rangers Olli Jokinen; Brandon Prust
March 3, 2010	To Calgary Flames Vesa Toskala	To Anaheim Ducks Curtis McElhinney
March 3, 2010	To Calgary Flames 4th-round pick in 2010	To Nashville Predators Dustin Boyd
March 3, 2010	To Calgary Flames Steve Staios	To Edmonton Oilers Aaron Johnson; Conditional 3rd-round pick in 2010 or 2011

=== Additions and subtractions ===
Additions
Player	Former team	Via
Fredrik Sjostrom	New York Rangers	Free agency
Garth Murray	Phoenix Coyotes	Free agency
Riley Armstrong	San Jose Sharks	Free agency
Staffan Kronwall	Washington Capitals	Free agency
Jason Jaffray	Vancouver Canucks	Free agency
Brian McGrattan	Phoenix Coyotes	Free agency
Nigel Dawes	Phoenix Coyotes	Waivers

Subtractions
Player	New team	Via
Michael Cammalleri	Montreal Canadiens	Free agency
Adrian Aucoin	Phoenix Coyotes	Free agency
Warren Peters	Dallas Stars	Free agency
Todd Bertuzzi	Detroit Red Wings	Free agency
Andre Roy		Free agency
Rhett Warrener		Retirement
Jamie Lundmark	Toronto Maple Leafs	Waivers

== Draft picks ==
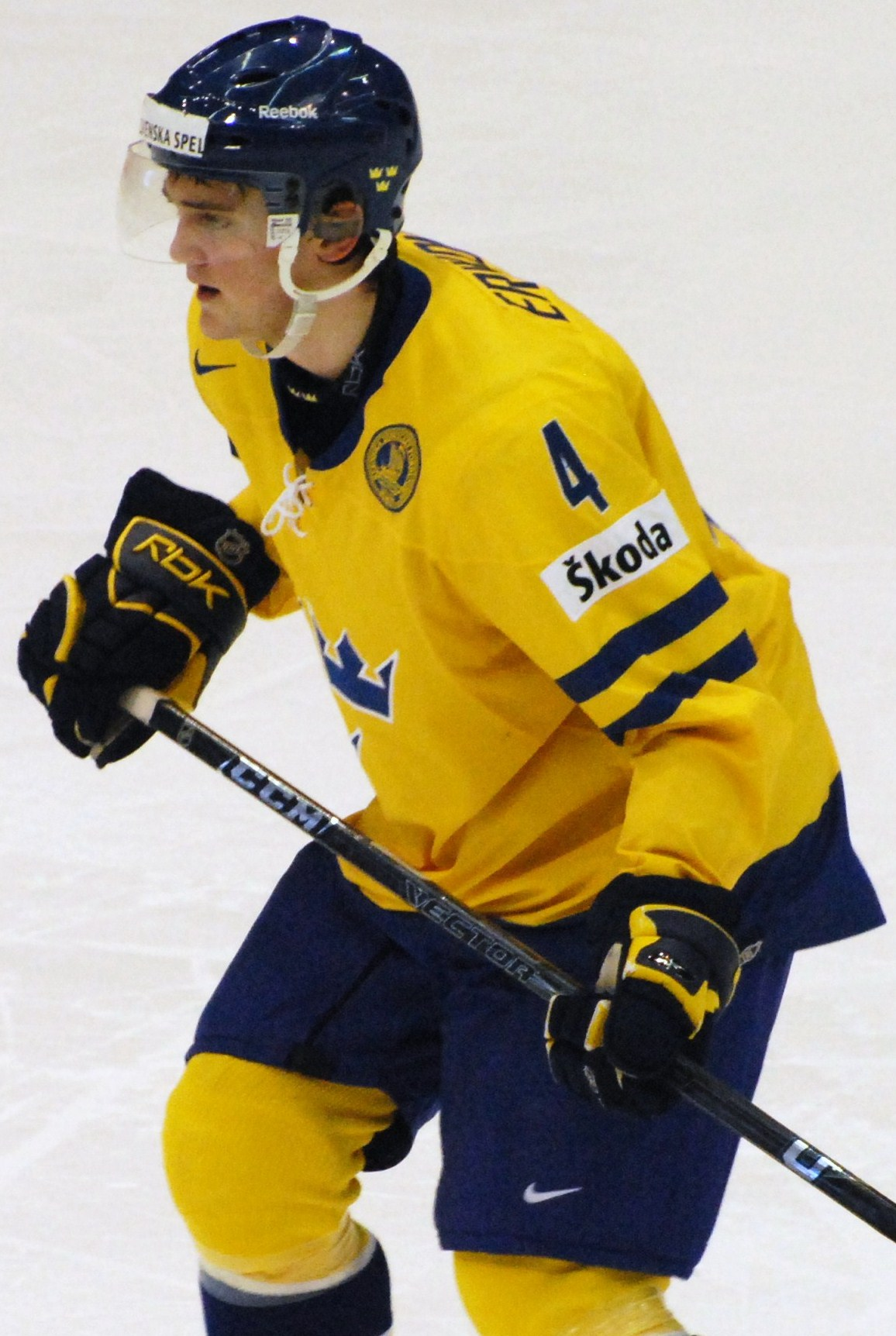
Tim Erixon was the Flames first-round selection in 2009.

The Flames opened the 2009 NHL entry draft in Montreal with the 20th overall selection but moved down three spots following a trade with New Jersey. With the 23rd overall pick, Calgary drafted Swedish defenceman Tim Erixon. Erixon, whose father Jan also played in the NHL, considers himself a two-way defenceman, and hopes to contribute both offensively and defensively for the Flames.

Rnd	Pick	Player	Nationality	Position	Team (league)	NHL statistics				
Rnd	Pick	Player	Nationality	Position	Team (league)	GP	G	A	Pts	PIM
1	23	Tim Erixon^{†}	Sweden	D	Skelleftea AIK (Elitserien)	93	2	12	14	38
3	74	Ryan Howse	Canada	LW	Chilliwack Bruins (WHL)					
4	111	Henrik Bjorklund	Sweden	RW	Farjestad BK (Elitserien)					
5	141	Spencer Bennett	Canada	LW	Surrey Eagles (BCHL)					
6	171	Joni Ortio^{†}	Finland	G	TPS Jr. (Fin Jr.)	15	8–6–0, 2.52 GAA			
7	201	Gaelan Patterson	Canada	C	Saskatoon Blades (WHL)					

Statistics are updated to the end of the 2014–15 NHL season. ^{†} denotes player was on an NHL roster in 2014–15.

== Farm teams ==
After two seasons in Illinois, the Flames' relocated their American Hockey League franchise, the Quad City Flames to the Fraser Valley of British Columbia. Called as the Abbotsford Heat, the team named former Calgary head coach Jim Playfair their coach. After six seasons, the Flames and the Las Vegas Wranglers of the ECHL ended their affiliation agreement. Replacing the Wranglers, the Flames signed an agreement to place up to four players with the Utah Grizzlies.

Playfair gained notoriety late in the season after video of his wild tantrum against referee Jamie Koharski that involved the coach smashing two sticks went viral. Playfair was upset at what he felt was an excessive penalty given to one of his players, and came as the Heat were struggling to clinch a playoff spot. The Heat finished with a record of 39–29–5–7, good enough for third place in the North Division, despite losing over 400-man-games to injury. The Heat faced the Rochester Americans in the first round of the playoffs, and overcame a 3–1 series deficit to defeat the Americans in seven games. In doing so, they became the first team in AHL history to win games six and seven on the road to win a series. Abbotsford was defeated in six games by the Hamilton Bulldogs in the North Division final to end their season.
