= 2009–10 NHL suspensions and fines =

The following is a list of all suspensions and fines enforced in the National Hockey League during the 2009–10 NHL season. It lists which players or coaches of what team have been punished for which offense and the amount of punishment they have received.

== Suspensions ==
Date	Name	Team	Offense	Length
September 21, 2009	Pascal Morency	New York Islanders	Leaving the bench to start a fight with Dion Phaneuf during preseason.	8 games (3 preseason games and 5 regular season games)
September 23, 2009	Sean O'Donnell	Los Angeles Kings	Cross-check Matt Martin during preseason.	5 games (3 preseason, 2 regular season)
September 24, 2009	Francis Lessard	Phoenix Coyotes	Boarding Ryan Donelly during preseason.	5 games (2 preseason, 3 regular season)
October 10, 2009	Brad Staubitz	San Jose Sharks	Hitting Davis Drewiske after whistle on icing.	1 game
October 22, 2009	Evgeny Artyukhin	Anaheim Ducks	Slew-footing Matt Niskanen.	3 games
October 24, 2009	Tuomo Ruutu	Carolina Hurricanes	Boarding Darcy Tucker.	3 games
October 27, 2009	Steve Ott	Dallas Stars	Low hit on Carlo Colaiacovo.	2 games
November 2, 2009	James Wisniewski	Anaheim Ducks	Illegal hit on Shane Doan.	2 games
November 4, 2009	Dane Byers	New York Rangers	Automatic suspension due to instigator penalty in the last five minutes of a game.	1 game
November 5, 2009	Shane O'Brien	Vancouver Canucks	High-sticking Sean Avery while both players were on their respective benches	1 game
November 9, 2009	Curtis Glencross	Calgary Flames	Blindsided hit on Chris Drury.	3 games
November 12, 2009	Darcy Hordichuk	Vancouver Canucks	Automatic suspension due to instigator penalty in the last five minutes of a game.	1 game
November 20, 2009	James Neal	Dallas Stars	Hitting Derek Dorsett from behind.	2 games
November 23, 2009	Georges Laraque	Montreal Canadiens	Knee-on-knee hit with Niklas Kronwall.	5 games
November 24, 2009	Daniel Briere	Philadelphia Flyers	Cross-checking Scott Hannan in the head.	2 games
November 28, 2009	Patrick Kaleta	Buffalo Sabres	Boarding Jared Ross.	2 games
November 29, 2009	Matt Cooke	Pittsburgh Penguins	Deliberate check to the head area	2 games
December 1, 2009	Alexander Ovechkin	Washington Capitals	Knee-on-knee hit against Tim Gleason.	2 games
December 6, 2009	Daniel Carcillo	Philadelphia Flyers	Sucker-punched Matt Bradley.	4 games
January 11, 2010	Ed Jovanovski	Phoenix Coyotes	Elbowing to the head of John Tavares.	2 games
January 20, 2010	Andy Sutton	New York Islanders	Boarding Pascal Dupuis.	2 games
January 30, 2010	Mike Green	Washington Capitals	Elbowing Michael Frolik in the head.	3 games
February 14, 2010	Cam Janssen	St. Louis Blues	Elbowing Matt Bradley in the head.	5 games
March 5, 2010	Maxim Lapierre	Montreal Canadiens	Boarding Scott Nichol on a late hit after a scoring chance.	4 games
March 6, 2010	Derek Boogaard	Minnesota Wild	Knee-on-knee hit on Ryan Jones.	2 games
March 15, 2010	Alexander Ovechkin	Washington Capitals	Boarding Brian Campbell.	2 games
March 18, 2010	James Wisniewski	Anaheim Ducks	Boarding Brent Seabrook.	8 games
March 30, 2010	Daniel Carcillo	Philadelphia Flyers	Cross-checking David Clarkson in the face.	2 games
April 2, 2010	Colby Armstrong	Atlanta Thrashers	Elbowing Mathieu Perreault in the head.	2 games

== Fines ==
Date	Name	Team	Offense	Amount
October 7, 2009	Organization	Toronto Maple Leafs	The Toronto Maple Leafs organization was fined for tampering with Vancouver Canucks free agents.	Undisclosed amount
November 4, 2009	John Tortorella	New York Rangers (head coach)	Automatic fine because a player received an instigator penalty during the last five minutes of a game.	$10,000 U.S.
November 12, 2009	Alain Vigneault	Vancouver Canucks (head coach)	Automatic fine because a player received an instigator penalty during the last five minutes of a game.	$10,000 U.S.
December 17, 2009	David Koci	Colorado Avalanche	Boarding Mike Green.	Undisclosed amount
December 17, 2009	Jarkko Ruutu	Ottawa Senators	Illegal hit on Patrick Kaleta.	Undisclosed amount
January 13, 2010	Alexandre Burrows	Vancouver Canucks	Accused referee Stephane Auger giving him spiteful penalties, derisive comments	$2,500 U.S.
January 26, 2010	Colin White	New Jersey Devils	Illegal hit on Sean Bergenheim.	$2,500 U.S.
March 16, 2010	Steve Downie	Tampa Bay Lightning	Attempt to injure Sidney Crosby.	$1,000 U.S.

== See also ==
- 2009-10 NHL transactions
- 2009 NHL entry draft
- 2009 in sports
- 2010 in sports
- List of 2009–10 NHL Three Star Awards
