= Daymond Langkow =

Canadian ice hockey player (born 1976)

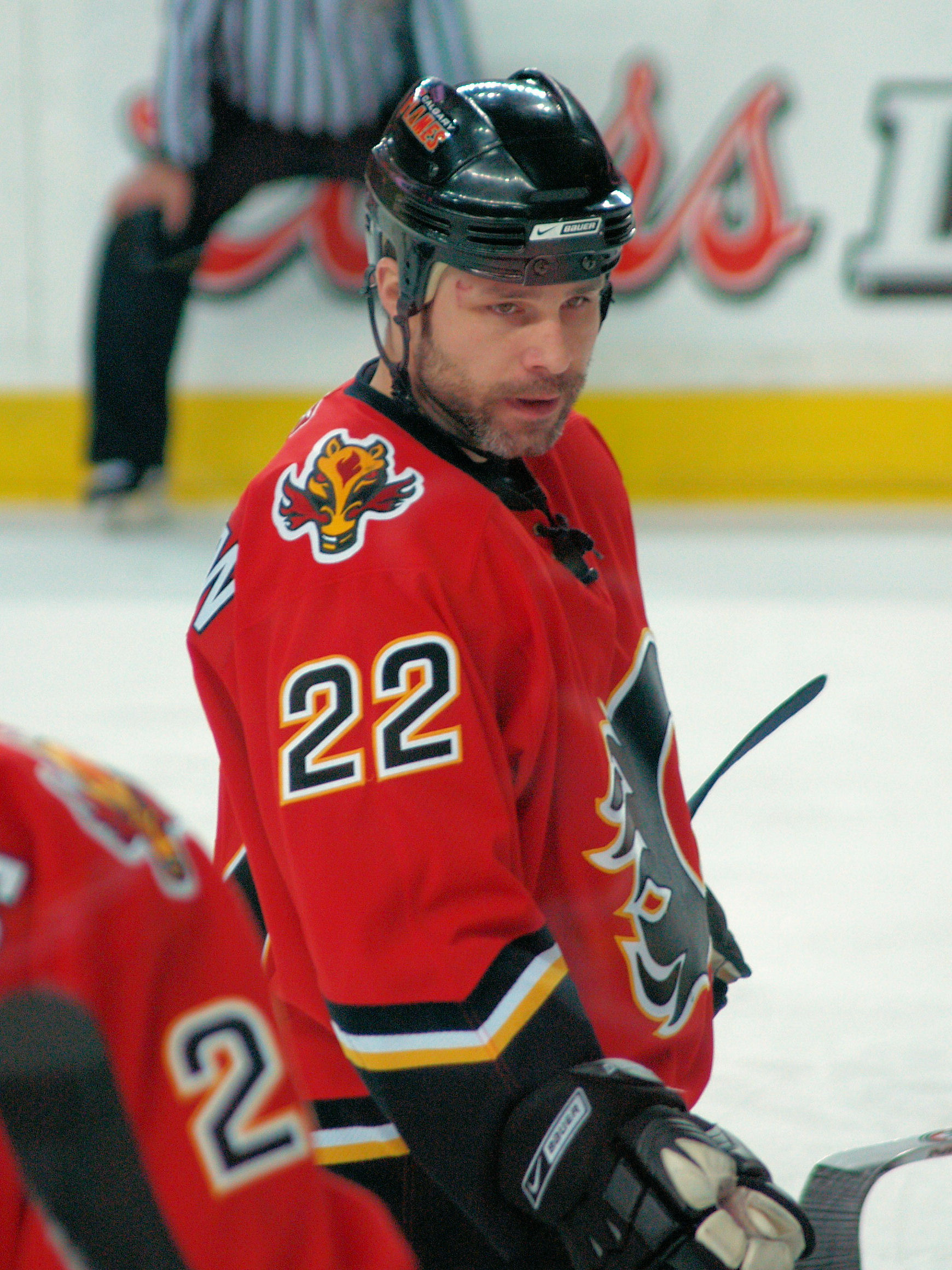
- Langkow with the Calgary Flames in 2007
- Born: September 27, 1976 (age 49) Edmonton, Alberta, Canada
- Height: 5 ft 11 in (180 cm)
- Weight: 183 lb (83 kg; 13 st 1 lb)
- Position: Centre
- Shot: Left
- Played for: Tampa Bay Lightning; Philadelphia Flyers; Phoenix Coyotes; Calgary Flames
- National team: Canada
- NHL draft: 5th overall, 1995; Tampa Bay Lightning
- Playing career: 1995–2013

Daymond Randolph Langkow (born September 27, 1976) is a Canadian former professional ice hockey player. A centre, he was the fifth overall selection of the Tampa Bay Lightning at the 1995 NHL entry draft. He played junior hockey with the Tri-City Americans in the Western Hockey League (WHL) and is their franchise record holder for career goals at 159. He won the Bob Clarke Trophy in 1995 as the WHL scoring leader with 140 points, and competed with the Canadian junior team at the 1996 World Junior Ice Hockey Championships where he won a gold medal.

Langkow made his NHL debut in 1995 with the Lightning, and also played for the Philadelphia Flyers, Phoenix Coyotes and Calgary Flames. He has scored 30 goals twice in his career, both with the Flames, and scored more than 50 points in eight consecutive seasons between 1999 and 2008. He was a nominee for the Bill Masterton Memorial Trophy in 1997 and has played over 1,000 games in the NHL. His older brother, Scott, was also a professional hockey player.

== Playing career ==
=== Junior ===
Langkow was selected by the Tri-City Americans in the second round of the 1991 Western Hockey League (WHL) Bantam Draft. He completed the 1991–92 season with the Edmonton Pats of the Alberta Midget Hockey League, scoring 81 points in 35 games while appearing in one game with the Americans as a 15-year-old. He joined Tri-City full-time in 1992–93, scoring 22 goals and 64 points in 64 games and improved to 40 goals and 83 points in 1993–94. Langkow averaged nearly two points per game in 1994–95, scoring 140 points in 72 games. He was named the recipient of the Bob Clarke Trophy as the top scorer in the WHL, and was named to the WHL West and Canadian Hockey League First All-Star Teams. He finished as the runner-up to Marty Murray for the Four Broncos Memorial Trophy as the WHL's most valuable player.

The Tampa Bay Lightning selected Langkow fifth overall in the 1995 NHL entry draft. On the eve of the 1995–96 season, the Lightning signed him to a three-year, $2.4 million contract. He made his National Hockey League (NHL) debut on October 7, 1995, against the Calgary Flames. Langkow appeared in four games with the Lightning before he was returned to Tri-City. He scored 91 points in 48 games with the Americans and was named to the WHL's West Second All-Star Team. As of 2024, he remains the Americans' franchise record holder for most career goals with 159. Langkow represented Canada at the 1996 World Junior Ice Hockey Championships where he won a gold medal.

=== Tampa, Philadelphia and Phoenix ===
Langkow rejoined the Lightning for the 1996–97 NHL season and scored 15 goals and 28 points in his rookie season. He scored his first NHL goal on November 19, 1996, against the Los Angeles Kings, and was named the NHL's rookie of the month for February 1997. He fell to 22 points in 1997–98 and ended the season in a dispute with the Lightning when he refused a demotion to the Adirondack Red Wings of the American Hockey League. The Lightning suspended him indefinitely, but told the media they were not interested in trading him. He missed seven games and lost $63,000 in salary before the Lightning relented and recalled him to finish the season in Tampa. Langkow was assigned to the Cleveland Lumberjacks of the International Hockey League to begin the 1998–99 season amidst trade rumours but was recalled after four games. He was traded to the Philadelphia Flyers along with Mikael Renberg on December 12, 1998, in exchange for Chris Gratton and Mike Sillinger.

While he was considered a throw-in for the Flyers who made the trade to re-acquire Renberg, Langkow flourished in Philadelphia. He finished the season with 14 goals combined between Tampa and Philadelphia, and his development as a playmaking centre earned him the Pelle Lindbergh Memorial from his teammates as the Flyers' most improved player. They re-signed Langkow to a two-year contract extension following the season. He set new personal highs in goals and assists in 1999–2000, finishing with 50 points and helping the Flyers reach the Eastern Conference Final in the 2000 Stanley Cup Playoffs. Despite missing 11-games with two broken feet, Langkow improved to 54 points in the 2000–01 season.

The acquisition of Jeremy Roenick and Jiri Dopita by the Flyers in the summer of 2001 left Langkow, a restricted free agent, as the odd man out in Philadelphia. He was dealt to the Phoenix Coyotes in exchange for a second-round draft pick in the 2002 NHL entry draft (Dan Sprang) and a first-round pick in 2003 (Jeff Carter). Unable to agree on a contract, Langkow and the Coyotes went to arbitration where he was awarded a two-year contract worth $4.2 million. He made an immediate impact with Phoenix, scoring his first career hat trick in a 5–2 victory over the Washington Capitals in the Coyotes' home opener. He finished the 2001–02 season as the team leader with 62 points. He fell back to 52 points in 2002–03, but scored his 100th career goal in his 500th career game on December 30, 2002, a 4–3 overtime victory against the Edmonton Oilers. He finished second in team scoring with 52 points, and served as an alternate captain for the Coyotes during the 2003–04 season.

=== Calgary ===
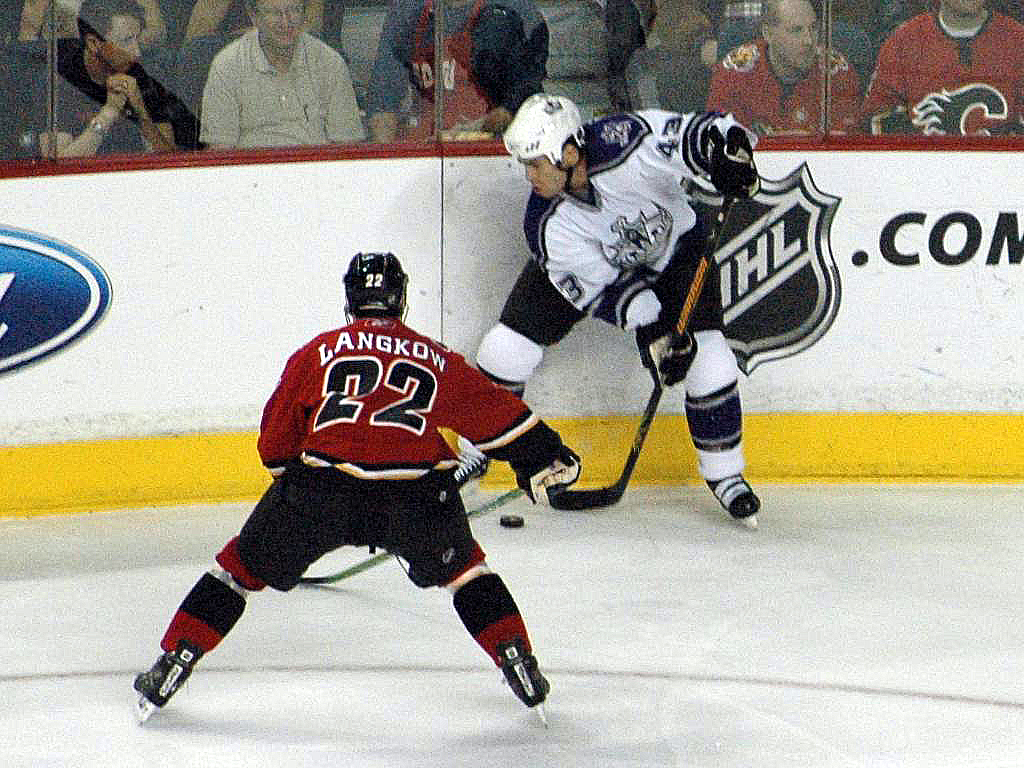
Langkow fighting for the puck against Mike Weaver of the Los Angeles Kings in February 2006.

The Coyotes signed Langkow to a one-year, $2.95 million contract in August 2004, but dealt him to the Calgary Flames less than two weeks later for Oleg Saprykin and Denis Gauthier. The season, and the contract, were wiped out by the 2004–05 NHL lockout; Langkow did not play anywhere during the lost season. The Flames signed Langkow to a new contract prior to the 2005–06 season amidst high expectations as he was placed on the top line with captain Jarome Iginla. He finished the season second on the Flames in both goals (25) and points (59) and recorded his sixth consecutive season with 50+ points.

Langkow emerged as a top scorer for the Flames in 2006–07, becoming the team's offensive leader while Iginla was sidelined for several weeks by a mid-season knee injury. He reached the 30-goal mark (33) for the first time in his career, finished with a career-high 77 points and was the Flames nominee for the Bill Masterton Memorial Trophy for dedication and sportsmanship. His teammates and coaches also praised his defensive ability, suggesting that he deserved a nomination for the Frank J. Selke Trophy as the NHL's top defensive forward. Langkow remained a top two-way forward for the Flames in 2007–08, recording his second consecutive 30-goal season and finishing third on the team with 65 points. The Flames re-signed him to a four-year, $18-million contract extension though the 2011–12 NHL season.

Langkow scored only 49 points in 2008–09 and missed ten games as result of a hand injury. It was the first time in nine seasons that he failed to reach the 50-point mark. He suffered another hand injury in the 2009 playoffs, though he still played all six games against the Chicago Blackhawks.

He played his 1,000th game, against his former club, the Tampa Bay Lightning, on February 6, 2010, one night after teammate Jarome Iginla reached the same mark. His offensive numbers continued to decline, as he finished the year with 14 goals and 37 points, his lowest totals in a decade. He missed the final ten games of the season after he was struck in the back of the neck by a slapshot during a game against the Minnesota Wild on March 21, resulting in a spinal cord injury.

His efforts to return to the Flames lineup suffered a setback in late October 2010, shortly after the 2010–11 season began earlier in the month, after which a Flames official stated it was a "50/50 proposition" on whether he would ever play another NHL game. Following several months of rehabilitation, Langkow was cleared for light skating by a neck specialist, allowing him to begin practicing with his Flames teammates at the end of February 26, 2011, though he was still considered 2–3 months away from being able to continue his career. He joined the Flames for full practices a couple weeks later, and by March 19 – nearly one year to the day of his injury – Langkow expressed hope that he would be able to return to action prior to the end of the season. That hope became reality late in the year as he was activated off injured reserve by the Flames, who announced he would return to the lineup for an April 1 game against the St. Louis Blues, 376 days and 88 games after he suffered the injury. In the final four games after missing the first 78 games, he was goalless and had an assist for one point as the Flames narrowly missed the playoffs, missing by three points. For his efforts at coming back from injury despite the Flames missing the playoffs for the second year in a row, Langkow was a finalist for the Bill Masterton Memorial Trophy that was ultimately won by Ian Laperriere of the Philadelphia Flyers.

=== Phoenix ===
The Phoenix Coyotes re-acquired Langkow on August 29, 2011, in exchange for forward Lee Stempniak During the 2011–12 season, Langkow missed seven games in November after his mother died suddenly at the age of 54. On July 7, 2013, Langkow announced his retirement.

== Personal life ==
Langkow is the second child of Randy and Vivian Langkow and grew up in Vegreville, Alberta. His parents divorced when he was ten years old. His father is a plumber in Edmonton, while his mother managed a restaurant in British Columbia prior to her November 2011 death.

Langkow and his wife Stephanie have four children, and expressed a desire to put down roots in the city of Calgary as a reason for his decision to sign a long-term contract extension with the Flames in 2008 rather than test free agency.

Langkow's son, Colton Langkow, currently plays in the Western Hockey League for the Vancouver Giants.

Langkow's older brother, Scott was a goaltender who played 20 NHL games for the Winnipeg Jets, Phoenix Coyotes and Atlanta Thrashers.

He also has a younger cousin, Chris Langkow, who is an ECHL All-Star and a Kelly Cup champion with the Alaska Aces, whom he frequently mentors and often gives advice.

== Career statistics ==
=== Regular season and playoffs ===
			Regular season					Playoffs
Season	Team	League	GP	G	A	Pts	PIM	GP	G	A	Pts	PIM
1991–92	Tri-City Americans	WHL	1	0	0	0	0	—	—	—	—	—
1992–93	Tri-City Americans	WHL	65	22	42	64	96	4	1	0	1	4
1993–94	Tri-City Americans	WHL	61	40	43	83	174	4	2	2	4	15
1994–95	Tri-City Americans	WHL	72	67	73	140	142	17	12	15	27	52
1995–96	Tampa Bay Lightning	NHL	4	0	1	1	0	—	—	—	—	—
1995–96	Tri-City Americans	WHL	48	30	61	91	103	11	14	13	27	20
1996–97	Adirondack Red Wings	AHL	2	1	1	2	0	—	—	—	—	—
1996–97	Tampa Bay Lightning	NHL	79	15	13	28	35	—	—	—	—	—
1997–98	Tampa Bay Lightning	NHL	68	8	14	22	62	—	—	—	—	—
1998–99	Cleveland Lumberjacks	IHL	4	1	1	2	18	—	—	—	—	—
1998–99	Tampa Bay Lightning	NHL	22	4	6	10	15	—	—	—	—	—
1998–99	Philadelphia Flyers	NHL	56	10	13	23	24	6	0	2	2	2
1999–00	Philadelphia Flyers	NHL	82	18	32	50	56	16	5	5	10	23
2000–01	Philadelphia Flyers	NHL	71	13	41	54	50	6	2	4	6	2
2001–02	Phoenix Coyotes	NHL	80	27	35	62	36	5	1	0	1	0
2002–03	Phoenix Coyotes	NHL	82	20	32	52	56	—	—	—	—	—
2003–04	Phoenix Coyotes	NHL	81	21	31	52	40	—	—	—	—	—
2005–06	Calgary Flames	NHL	82	25	34	59	46	7	1	5	6	6
2006–07	Calgary Flames	NHL	81	33	44	77	44	6	2	2	4	4
2007–08	Calgary Flames	NHL	80	30	35	65	19	7	3	2	5	0
2008–09	Calgary Flames	NHL	73	21	28	49	20	6	0	3	3	2
2009–10	Calgary Flames	NHL	72	14	23	37	30	—	—	—	—	—
2010–11	Calgary Flames	NHL	4	0	1	1	0	—	—	—	—	—
2011–12	Phoenix Coyotes	NHL	73	11	19	30	14	16	1	6	7	4
NHL totals			1,090	270	402	672	547	75	15	29	44	43

=== International ===
Year	Team	Event	Result	GP	G	A	Pts	PIM
1996	Canada	WJC	1st place, gold medalist(s)	5	3	3	6	2
Junior totals				5	3	3	5	2

== Awards and honours ==
Medal record

Representing Canada

Men's ice hockey

World Junior Championship
Gold medal – first place	1996 Canada	

Award	Year	Ref
Junior
Bob Clarke Trophy	1994–95	
WHL Western Conference First All-Star Team	1994–95	
CHL First Team All-Star	1994–95	
WHL Western Conference Second All-Star Team	1995–96	
Philadelphia Flyers
Pelle Lindbergh Memorial	1998–99	
Calgary Flames
J. R. "Bud" McCaig Award	2009–10	

Preceded by Jason Wiemer	Tampa Bay Lightning first-round draft pick 1995	Succeeded by Mario Larocque
