= 2009–10 NHL season =

National Hockey League season

- League: National Hockey League
- Sport: Ice hockey
- Duration: October 1, 2009 – June 9, 2010
- Games: 82
- Teams: 30
- TV partner(s): CBC, TSN, RDS (Canada); Versus, NBC (United States)

Draft
- Top draft pick: John Tavares
- Picked by: New York Islanders

Regular season
- Presidents' Trophy: Washington Capitals
- Season MVP: Henrik Sedin (Canucks)
- Top scorer: Henrik Sedin (Canucks)

Playoffs
- Playoffs MVP: Jonathan Toews (Blackhawks)

Stanley Cup
- Champions: Chicago Blackhawks
- Runners-up: Philadelphia Flyers

NHL seasons
- 2008–09 2010–11

The 2009–10 NHL season was the 93rd season of operation (92nd season of play) of the National Hockey League (NHL). It ran from October 1, 2009—including four games in Europe on October 2 and 3—until April 11, 2010, with the 2010 Stanley Cup playoffs running to June 9, 2010. A mid-season break from February 15 to February 28 occurred to allow participation of NHL players in the 2010 Winter Olympics in Vancouver. Because of the Winter Olympics break, there was no NHL All-Star Game for 2010. The Stanley Cup Final saw the Chicago Blackhawks defeat the Philadelphia Flyers in six games, for their first championship since the 1960–61 season.

== League business ==
=== Salary cap ===
The salary cap was increased by a small amount for the 2009–10 season. It was set at US$56.8 million, US$100,000 higher than in the 2008–09 season. The salary floor was US$40.8 million.

=== Entry draft ===
The Entry Draft was held June 26–27, 2009 at the Bell Centre in Montreal, Quebec. The New York Islanders chose John Tavares with the first overall pick. Other notable picks were Matt Duchene, Victor Hedman, Evander Kane and Oliver Ekman-Larsson.

=== Phoenix Coyotes bankruptcy and sale ===
The Phoenix Coyotes' holding company, Dewey Ranch Hockey LLC, filed for Chapter 11 bankruptcy. In a statement, Moyes announced that he had agreed in principle to sell the team to PSE Sports and Entertainment, headed by Research in Motion co-CEO Jim Balsillie, for US$212.5 million. As part of the deal, Balsillie intended to move the Coyotes to Hamilton, Ontario. Although initial reports said that Balsillie was considering Kitchener as well, Hamilton already has an NHL-sized arena in place, Copps Coliseum, and Balsillie was already in talks with city officials to secure a lease for the arena. Hamilton had previously bid for an NHL team in the 1990s, losing out to Ottawa. Balsillie had previously made unsuccessful approaches to purchase the Pittsburgh Penguins and Nashville Predators, with the intent of relocating either team to Hamilton.

The NHL opposed the bankruptcy and the matter went to Phoenix bankruptcy court. Two other potential bidders for the team emerged, Jerry Reinsdorf, owner of the Chicago White Sox and Ice Edge Holdings. Bankruptcy hearings were held from May until September. Reinsdorf and Ice Edge did not bid for the team, and the NHL put in the only rival bid for the team at court.

In September, a Phoenix bankruptcy court rejected offers from the NHL and Jim Balsillie, ending Balsillie's plan to move the Coyotes to Hamilton. The NHL's offer was rejected because it left out creditors Jerry Moyes and Wayne Gretzky. On Balsillie's offer, Judge Redfield T. Baum refused to sanction the use of bankruptcy to force relocation of a franchise on a league. Gretzky, who was head coach of the team for the previous four seasons, stayed away from training camp and was replaced. The Coyotes played their first home game to a sell-out; however, attendance was lower at other games in the month of October. Later in the month, the NHL and Moyes came to a tentative agreement to transfer ownership of the Coyotes to the NHL.

In December, the NHL announced that Ice Edge Holdings, a partnership of Canadians and Phoenix-area businessmen, had signed a letter of intent with the NHL to purchase the Coyotes. Ice Edge, which plans to keep the team in Phoenix, plans to play five Coyotes home games in Saskatoon, Saskatchewan, each season as part of a five-year plan to return the Coyotes to profitability. Ice Edge would still have to negotiate a lease agreement with the City of Glendale, and have its ownership approved by the NHL Board of Governors.

On March 6, the NHL launched a lawsuit for $61 million against former Coyotes owner Jerry Moyes to recover $10 million in bankruptcy court costs, $20 million in losses for 2009–10 and $11.6 million owed to creditors. Three weeks later, the Coyotes clinched their first playoff berth since 2002.

On April 13, Glendale, Arizona City Council approved a lease and sale agreement with Jerry Reinsdorf to take over the Coyotes and their lease of the Jobing.com Arena. The Council rejected the Ice Edge group. The agreement created a special tax district surrounding the arena. Businesses in that district would pay $47 million annually to support the team. The agreement gave Reinsdorf the option to move the team after five years if revenues were not up to expectations. Former Coyotes CEO Jeff Shumway criticized the deal, saying that the team would not have gone bankrupt if the same deal had been available two years earlier. Reinsdorf's bid, which paid the NHL $65 million for the team, needed approval by the league board of governors.

=== New uniforms ===
Several teams (Calgary, Minnesota, Nashville, Florida and Colorado) debuted new third uniforms this season, while Philadelphia and Edmonton made their third uniform their primary home jersey, and Chicago made the jersey they wore for the previous season's Winter Classic their new alternate. The New Jersey Devils announced plans to play one game (March 17 against the Pittsburgh Penguins, the first anniversary of Martin Brodeur's record breaking 552nd win) wearing their 1982–1992 uniforms, albeit transferred onto the league's current RBK Edge jersey template. In addition, NHL officials had new uniforms, which debuted at the 2009 All-Star Game.

=== Arena changes ===
- The Boston Bruins' home arena, TD Banknorth Garden, was renamed TD Garden after TD Banknorth rebranded to TD Bank.
- The Nashville Predators' home arena, the Sommet Center, temporarily reverted to its original Nashville Arena name on December 3, 2009, after the team sued the Sommet Group for failing to make numerous payments under the naming rights agreement. The Predators then signed a naming rights deal with Bridgestone on February 23, 2010, renaming the building Bridgestone Arena.

== Pre-season ==
The 2009–10 pre-season for most teams started on September 14, 2009.

=== 2009 Kraft Hockeyville ===
Since 2006, Kraft Foods has sponsored a sweepstakes called Kraft Hockeyville, in which various small cities across Canada compete against each other with the hopes of winning the privilege of having an NHL pre-season game played in a local sports complex or arena, along with a hockey festival named the Stanley Cup Jamboree. The 2009 winner was the city of Terrace, British Columbia. The pre-season matchup was between the home town favorite Vancouver Canucks and the New York Islanders.

=== Victoria Cup ===
The Victoria Cup, which was held in Zürich, Switzerland, on September 29, 2009, just prior to the regular-season games, was contested between ZSC Zurich Lions and the NHL's Chicago Blackhawks. The game was won by Zurich 2–1.

== Regular season ==
=== International games ===
Four teams (Blackhawks, Blues, Panthers and Red Wings) began their season in the NHL Premiere series, each playing two regular-season games in Europe. The Red Wings played the Blues in Stockholm, Sweden, at Ericsson Globe while the Blackhawks and Panthers played in Helsinki, Finland, at Hartwall Areena on October 2 and October 3. This is the second-straight season that Sweden has hosted an NHL regular season game, and the third season of the Premiere series, in which NHL regular season games are held in Europe. Unlike in previous years, the European games are not the inaugural games, as the regular season began October 1 in North America.

=== Winter Classic ===
On July 15, 2009, the NHL announced that the third installment of the Winter Classic would take place on January 1, 2010, at Fenway Park in Boston, with the Bruins hosting the Flyers. Because the NHL did not host an All-Star Game in the 2009–10 season due to the 2010 Olympics, this became the league's showcase event. The Bruins won the game 2–1 in overtime. Marco Sturm scored the game-winning overtime goal, after the Bruins were initially down 1–0 in regulation. After the game, the roster of the United States men's hockey team for the 2010 Winter Olympics was released, which included Bruins' goaltender Tim Thomas.

=== Olympics ===
The NHL did not hold an All-Star Game this season. Instead, a number of the league's players participated in the 2010 Winter Olympics in Vancouver, British Columbia. The Olympic men's ice hockey tournament ran from February 16 to February 28, 2010. It was the first time since the NHL allowed its players to compete in the Olympics that the Winter Olympics were held in an NHL market, as well as the first to use an NHL-sized ice rink (as opposed to the bigger one normally used for international play). General Motors Place, the Canucks' home arena, was the primary ice hockey venue for the Olympics, and was formally called Canada Hockey Place. The temporary name change reflects the International Olympic Committee policy against selling or promoting naming rights for its competition venues. Another example of this policy is that the ice surface and dasher boards had their advertisements removed. The Canadian team won gold, the American team won silver, and the Finnish team won bronze. At the end of the tournament, United States goaltender Ryan Miller was named Tournament MVP.

In order to prepare General Motors Place for the Olympics, the Canucks were required to face the longest road trip in NHL history, playing 14 straight road games from January 27 to March 13, 2010

=== Highlights ===
The Avalanche, picked by some in the media to finish last in the Western Conference, instead roared to a 10–2–2 mark for the month of October to lead the Western Conference, partly on the strong play of Craig Anderson in net and rookies Ryan O'Reilly and Matt Duchene. The Coyotes, who were also not expected to make the playoffs, started strongly. The team had signed some veterans and demoted some young players to the minors. The Coyotes surprised the Stanley Cup champion Penguins 3–0 in Pittsburgh.

The Avalanche retired 19, the number of Joe Sakic, at their home opener on October 1. The Canadiens celebrated their centennial on December 4 and retired the number 3 for Emile Bouchard and number 16 for Elmer Lach (which was already previously retired for Henri Richard). The Phoenix Coyotes retired 27, the number of Teppo Numminen at their home game.

Two streaks came to an end in November. The Devils won nine games in a row on the road to start the season, one short of the league record set in the 2006–07 season by the Sabres, before losing in Philadelphia to the Flyers. The Hurricanes lost a franchise-high 14 games in a row before defeating the Wild in a shootout on November 15. The streak included overtime and shootout losses.

The 2009 flu pandemic hit the Oilers hard with several players out for stretches in October. The Flames received their flu shots ahead of the general public, causing an Alberta health official to be fired. The Maple Leafs and the Canucks teams both had members of their staff "jump the queue" and receive flu shots ahead of the general public and were criticized in the media.

In December, Shane Doan of the Coyotes played his 1,000th game in a 2–1 shootout win over the Blue Jackets. On December 21, New Jersey Devils goaltender Martin Brodeur recorded his 104th shutout, breaking a record set by Terry Sawchuk during the 1969–70 NHL season.

Three head coaches lost their positions in mid-season. Despite being early favorites for the Stanley Cup, the Philadelphia Flyers were 13–11–1 and 10th in the Eastern Conference when John Stevens was fired on December 4, 2009. On January 2, 2010, the Blues fired Head Coach Andy Murray. In 2008–09, the Blues had made the playoffs but struggled during 2009–10. Davis Payne was named interim head coach. One month later, on February 3, 2010, the Blue Jackets, unhappy with their slide in the standings after a good start, fired defensive-minded Head Coach Ken Hitchcock. Although the slide had started months previous, team management had given time to Hitchcock to resolve the situation before firing him.

Player trades started in earnest a month before the March 3, 2010, trade deadline. On January 31, the Maple Leafs made two large trades, getting Dion Phaneuf from the Flames in a seven-player trade, and Jean-Sebastien Giguere from the Ducks for two players. The Flames were not done, trading Olli Jokinen to the Rangers the next day. After top scorer and pending free agent Ilya Kovalchuk turned down a US$101 million contract offer from the Thrashers, he was traded to the Devils on February 4.

On February 5, Boston investment banker Jeff Vinik agreed to buy the Lightning from owners OK Hockey, headed by Oren Koules and Len Barrie. The sale price was not disclosed, although the media speculated it was much less than the US$206 million that OK Hockey paid. The purchase was contingent on the approval of the NHL Board of Governors.

On February 8, Canadiens' General Manager Bob Gainey announced his retirement as GM, staying on as advisor to the club. Assistant GM Pierre Gauthier became the interim GM. Gauthier and Coach Jacques Martin held the same positions with the Senators in the late 1990s.

From 3 pm EST on February 12 until 11:59 pm on Feb. 28, teams were not permitted to make any trades, since multiple NHL players were competing at the 2010 Winter Olympics. The most active team for trades was the Coyotes, who were involved in seven deals. Unlike previous seasons, the Coyotes were in a playoff position at the trade deadline and were "buyers" of players rather than "sellers" (that is, they were looking to acquire key players to give the team a chance in the playoffs, rather than trading away players to other teams seeking playoff success).

On April 8, 2010, the Pittsburgh Penguins defeated the New York Islanders 7–3 in the final regular season game at Mellon Arena. The Penguins would move to CONSOL Energy Center for the next season.

== Standings ==
GP = Games played, W = Wins, L = Losses, OTL = Overtime/shootout losses, GF = Goals for, GA = Goals against, Pts = Points

bold – Qualified for playoffs; y – Won division

=== Eastern Conference ===
p – Won Presidents' Trophy (and division)

Eastern Conference
R		Div	GP	W	L	OTL	GF	GA	Pts
**1**	**p – Washington Capitals**	**SE**	**82**	**54**	**15**	**13**	**318**	**233**	121
**2**	**y – New Jersey Devils**	**AT**	**82**	**48**	**27**	**7**	**222**	**191**	103
**3**	**y – Buffalo Sabres**	**NE**	**82**	**45**	**27**	**10**	**235**	**207**	100
**4**	**Pittsburgh Penguins**	**AT**	**82**	**47**	**28**	**7**	**257**	**237**	101
**5**	**Ottawa Senators**	**NE**	**82**	**44**	**32**	**6**	**225**	**238**	94
**6**	**Boston Bruins**	**NE**	**82**	**39**	**30**	**13**	**206**	**200**	91
**7**	**Philadelphia Flyers**	**AT**	**82**	**41**	**35**	**6**	**236**	**225**	88
**8**	**Montreal Canadiens**	**NE**	**82**	**39**	**33**	**10**	**217**	**223**	88
8.5
9	New York Rangers	AT	82	38	33	11	222	218	87
10	Atlanta Thrashers	SE	82	35	34	13	234	256	83
11	Carolina Hurricanes	SE	82	35	37	10	230	256	80
12	Tampa Bay Lightning	SE	82	34	36	12	217	260	80
13	New York Islanders	AT	82	34	37	11	222	264	79
14	Florida Panthers	SE	82	32	37	13	208	244	77
15	Toronto Maple Leafs	NE	82	30	38	14	214	267	74

bold – Qualified for playoffs; y – Won division; p – Won Presidents' Trophy (and division)

AT – Atlantic Division, NE – Northeast Division, SE – Southeast Division

=== Western Conference ===
Western Conference
R		Div	GP	W	L	OTL	GF	GA	Pts
**1**	**z – San Jose Sharks**	**PA**	**82**	**51**	**20**	**11**	**264**	**215**	113
**2**	**y – Chicago Blackhawks**	**CE**	**82**	**52**	**22**	**8**	**271**	**209**	112
**3**	**y – Vancouver Canucks**	**NW**	**82**	**49**	**28**	**5**	**272**	**222**	103
**4**	**Phoenix Coyotes**	**PA**	**82**	**50**	**25**	**7**	**225**	**202**	107
**5**	**Detroit Red Wings**	**CE**	**82**	**44**	**24**	**14**	**229**	**216**	102
**6**	**Los Angeles Kings**	**PA**	**82**	**46**	**27**	**9**	**241**	**219**	101
**7**	**Nashville Predators**	**CE**	**82**	**47**	**29**	**6**	**225**	**225**	100
**8**	**Colorado Avalanche**	**NW**	**82**	**43**	**30**	**9**	**244**	**233**	95
8.5
9	Calgary Flames	NW	82	40	32	10	225	223	90
10	St. Louis Blues	CE	82	40	32	10	204	210	90
11	Anaheim Ducks	PA	82	39	32	11	238	251	89
12	Dallas Stars	PA	82	37	31	14	237	254	88
13	Minnesota Wild	NW	82	38	36	8	219	246	84
14	Columbus Blue Jackets	CE	82	32	35	15	216	259	79
15	Edmonton Oilers	NW	82	27	47	8	214	284	62

bold – Qualified for playoffs; y – Won division; z – Won conference (and division)

=== Tiebreaking procedures ===
If two or more clubs are tied in points during the regular season, the ranking of the clubs is determined in the following order:

1. The fewer number of games played.
2. The greater number of games won.
3. The greater number of points earned in games between the tied clubs. If two clubs are tied, and have not played an equal number of home games against each other, points earned in the first game played in the city that had the extra game shall not be included. If more than two clubs are tied, the higher percentage of available points earned in games among those clubs, and not including any "odd" games, shall be used to determine the standing.
4. The greater differential between goals for and against for the entire regular season.

== Playoffs ==
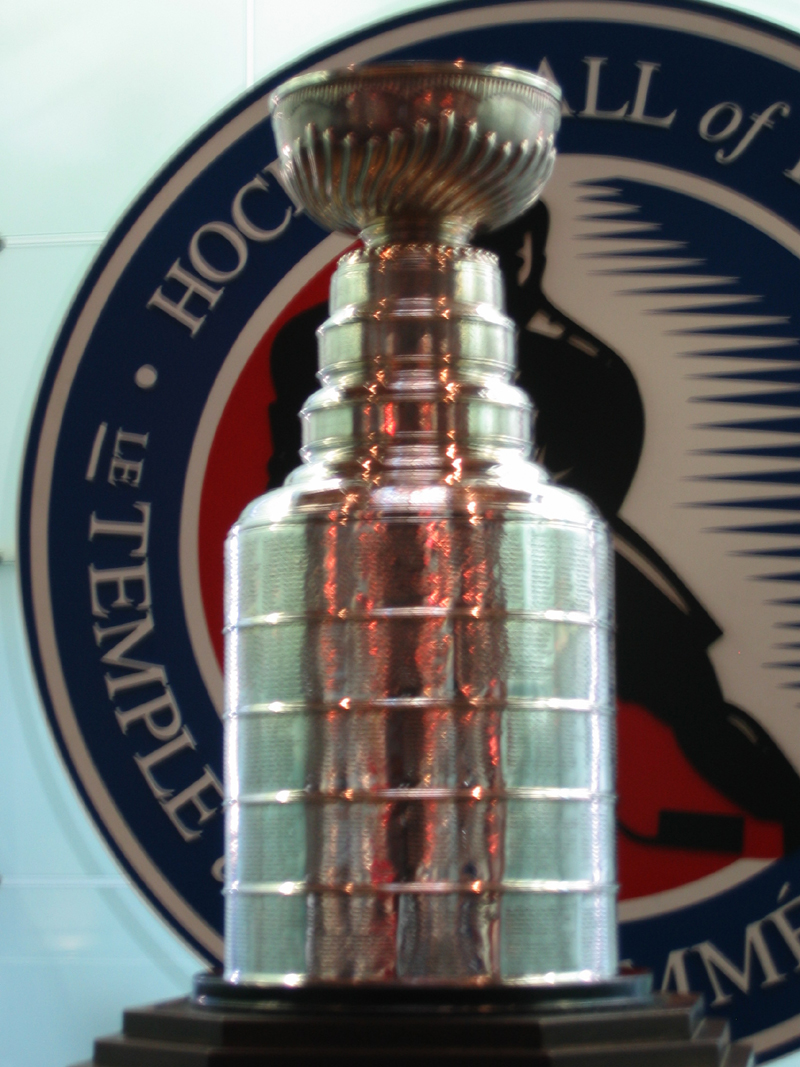
The Stanley Cup

=== Bracket ===
In each round, teams competed in a best-of-seven series following a 2–2–1–1–1 format (scores in the bracket indicate the number of games won in each best-of-seven series). The team with home ice advantage played at home for games one and two (and games five and seven, if necessary), and the other team played at home for games three and four (and game six, if necessary). The top eight teams in each conference made the playoffs, with the three division winners seeded 1–3 based on regular season record, and the five remaining teams seeded 4–8.

The NHL used "re-seeding" instead of a fixed bracket playoff system. During the first three rounds, the highest remaining seed in each conference was matched against the lowest remaining seed, the second-highest remaining seed played the second-lowest remaining seed, and so forth. The higher-seeded team was awarded home ice advantage. The two conference winners then advanced to the Stanley Cup Final, where home ice advantage was awarded to the team that had the better regular season record.

Conference quarterfinals	Conference semifinals
1	Washington	3
8	Montreal	4
4	Pittsburgh	3
8	Montreal	4
5	Ottawa	2
4	Pittsburgh	4
Eastern Conference
3	Buffalo	2
6	Boston	4
6	Boston	3
7	Philadelphia	4
7	Philadelphia	4
2	New Jersey	1
1	San Jose	4
8	Colorado	2
1	San Jose	4
5	Detroit	1
2	Chicago	4
7	Nashville	2
Western Conference
3	Vancouver	4
6	Los Angeles	2
2	Chicago	4
3	Vancouver	2
4	Phoenix	3
5	Detroit	4

Conference finals
8	Montreal	1
7	Philadelphia	4
1	San Jose	0
2	Chicago	4

Stanley Cup Final
E7	Philadelphia	2
W2	Chicago	4

== NHL awards ==
2009–10 NHL awards
Award	Recipient(s)	Runner(s)-up/Finalists
Presidents' Trophy	Washington Capitals	San Jose Sharks
Prince of Wales Trophy (Eastern Conference playoff champion)	Philadelphia Flyers	Montreal Canadiens
Clarence S. Campbell Bowl (Western Conference playoff champion)	Chicago Blackhawks	San Jose Sharks
Art Ross Trophy	Henrik Sedin (Vancouver Canucks)	Alexander Ovechkin (Washington Capitals); Sidney Crosby (Pittsburgh Penguins)
Bill Masterton Memorial Trophy	Jose Theodore (Washington Capitals)	Kurtis Foster (Tampa Bay Lightning); Jed Ortmeyer (San Jose Sharks)
Calder Memorial Trophy	Tyler Myers (Buffalo Sabres)	Matt Duchene (Colorado Avalanche); Jimmy Howard (Detroit Red Wings)
Conn Smythe Trophy	Jonathan Toews (Chicago Blackhawks)	Patrick Kane (Chicago Blackhawks)
Frank J. Selke Trophy	Pavel Datsyuk (Detroit Red Wings)	Ryan Kesler (Vancouver Canucks); Jordan Staal (Pittsburgh Penguins)
Hart Memorial Trophy	Henrik Sedin (Vancouver Canucks)	Alexander Ovechkin (Washington Capitals); Sidney Crosby (Pittsburgh Penguins)
Jack Adams Award	Dave Tippett (Phoenix Coyotes)	Barry Trotz (Nashville Predators); Joe Sacco (Colorado Avalanche)
James Norris Memorial Trophy	Duncan Keith (Chicago Blackhawks)	Mike Green (Washington Capitals); Drew Doughty (Los Angeles Kings)
King Clancy Memorial Trophy	Shane Doan (Phoenix Coyotes)	N/A
Lady Byng Memorial Trophy	Martin St. Louis (Tampa Bay Lightning)	Brad Richards (Dallas Stars); Pavel Datsyuk (Detroit Red Wings)
Ted Lindsay Award	Alexander Ovechkin (Washington Capitals)	Sidney Crosby (Pittsburgh Penguins); Henrik Sedin (Vancouver Canucks)
Mark Messier Leadership Award	Sidney Crosby (Pittsburgh Penguins)	Shane Doan (Phoenix Coyotes); Ryan Miller (Buffalo Sabres)
Maurice 'Rocket' Richard Trophy	Sidney Crosby (Pittsburgh Penguins); Steven Stamkos (Tampa Bay Lightning)	Alexander Ovechkin (Washington Capitals)
NHL Foundation Player Award	Ryan Miller (Buffalo Sabres)	N/A
NHL General Manager of the Year Award	Don Maloney (Phoenix Coyotes)	Greg Sherman (Colorado Avalanche); Doug Wilson (San Jose Sharks)
Scotiabank/NHL Fan Fav Award	Roberto Luongo (Vancouver Canucks)	N/A
Vezina Trophy	Ryan Miller (Buffalo Sabres)	Martin Brodeur (New Jersey Devils); Ilya Bryzgalov (Phoenix Coyotes)
William M. Jennings Trophy	Martin Brodeur (New Jersey Devils)	N/A

=== All-Star teams ===
First Team	Position	Second Team
Ryan Miller, Buffalo Sabres	G	Ilya Bryzgalov, Phoenix Coyotes
Duncan Keith, Chicago Blackhawks	D	Drew Doughty, Los Angeles Kings
Mike Green, Washington Capitals	D	Nicklas Lidstrom, Detroit Red Wings
Alexander Ovechkin, Washington Capitals	LW	Daniel Sedin, Vancouver Canucks
Henrik Sedin, Vancouver Canucks	C	Sidney Crosby, Pittsburgh Penguins
Patrick Kane, Chicago Blackhawks	RW	Martin St. Louis, Tampa Bay Lightning

== Player statistics ==
=== Scoring leaders ===
The following players led the league in points at the conclusion of the regular season. GP = Games played; G = Goals; A = Assists; Pts = Points; +/– = Plus–minus; PIM = Penalty minutes

Player	Team	GP	G	A	Pts	+/–	PIM
Henrik Sedin	Vancouver Canucks	82	29	83	112	+35	48
Alexander Ovechkin	Washington Capitals	72	50	59	109	+45	89
Sidney Crosby	Pittsburgh Penguins	81	51	58	109	+15	69
Nicklas Backstrom	Washington Capitals	82	33	68	101	+37	50
Steven Stamkos	Tampa Bay Lightning	82	51	44	95	−2	38
Martin St. Louis	Tampa Bay Lightning	82	29	65	94	−8	12
Brad Richards	Dallas Stars	80	24	67	91	−12	14
Joe Thornton	San Jose Sharks	79	20	69	89	+17	54
Patrick Kane	Chicago Blackhawks	82	30	58	88	+16	20
Marian Gaborik	New York Rangers	76	42	44	86	+15	37

Source: NHL

=== Leading goaltenders ===
The following goaltenders led the league in goals against average at the end of the regular season.

GP = Games played; Min = Minutes played; W = Wins; L = Losses; OT = Overtime/shootout losses; GA = Goals against; SO = Shutouts; SV% = Save percentage; GAA = Goals against average

Player	Team	GP	Min	W	L	OT	GA	SO	SV%	GAA
Tuukka Rask	Boston Bruins	45	2,562:11	22	12	5	84	5	.931	1.97
Ryan Miller	Buffalo Sabres	69	4,047:10	41	18	8	150	5	.929	2.22
Martin Brodeur	New Jersey Devils	77	4,499:01	45	25	6	168	9	.916	2.24
Antti Niemi	Chicago Blackhawks	39	2,190:28	26	7	4	82	7	.912	2.25
Jimmy Howard	Detroit Red Wings	63	3,740:15	37	15	10	141	3	.924	2.26
Ilya Bryzgalov	Phoenix Coyotes	69	4,084:27	42	20	6	156	8	.920	2.29
Miikka Kiprusoff	Calgary Flames	73	4,235:19	35	28	10	163	4	.920	2.31
Henrik Lundqvist	New York Rangers	73	4,203:49	35	27	10	167	4	.921	2.38
Jaroslav Halak	Montreal Canadiens	45	2,629:56	26	13	5	105	5	.924	2.40
Evgeni Nabokov	San Jose Sharks	71	4,194:07	44	16	10	170	3	.922	2.43

== Coaches ==
=== Eastern Conference ===
- Atlanta Thrashers: John Anderson
- Boston Bruins: Claude Julien
- Buffalo Sabres: Lindy Ruff
- Carolina Hurricanes: Paul Maurice
- Florida Panthers: Peter DeBoer
- Montreal Canadiens: Jacques Martin
- New Jersey Devils: Jacques Lemaire
- New York Islanders: Scott Gordon
- New York Rangers: John Tortorella
- Ottawa Senators: Cory Clouston
- Philadelphia Flyers: John Stevens and Peter Laviolette
- Pittsburgh Penguins: Dan Bylsma
- Tampa Bay Lightning: Rick Tocchet
- Toronto Maple Leafs: Ron Wilson
- Washington Capitals: Bruce Boudreau

=== Western Conference ===
- Anaheim Ducks: Randy Carlyle
- Calgary Flames: Brent Sutter
- Chicago Blackhawks: Joel Quenneville
- Colorado Avalanche: Joe Sacco
- Columbus Blue Jackets: Ken Hitchcock and Claude Noel
- Dallas Stars: Marc Crawford
- Detroit Red Wings: Mike Babcock
- Edmonton Oilers: Pat Quinn
- Los Angeles Kings: Terry Murray
- Minnesota Wild: Todd Richards
- Nashville Predators: Barry Trotz
- Phoenix Coyotes: Dave Tippett
- San Jose Sharks: Todd McLellan
- St. Louis Blues: Andy Murray and Davis Payne
- Vancouver Canucks: Alain Vigneault

== Milestones ==
=== First games ===
The following is a list of players of note who played their first NHL game in 2009–10, listed with their first team:

Player	Team	Notability
Jamie Benn	Dallas Stars	Art Ross Trophy winner, Three-time NHL All-Star team
John Carlson	Washington Capitals	Two-time NHL All-Star team
Logan Couture	San Jose Sharks	All-Star rookie team
Matt Duchene	Colorado Avalanche	All-Star rookie team
Devan Dubnyk	Edmonton Oilers	Bill Masterton Memorial Trophy winner, One-time NHL All-Star team
Deryk Engelland	Pittsburgh Penguins	Mark Messier Leadership Award winner
Victor Hedman	Tampa Bay Lightning	James Norris Memorial Trophy winner, Conn Smythe Trophy winner, Seven-time NHL All-Star team
Erik Karlsson	Ottawa Senators	Three-time James Norris Memorial Trophy winner, Five-time NHL All-Star team
Brad Marchand	Boston Bruins	Four-time NHL All-Star team
Tyler Myers	Buffalo Sabres	Calder Memorial Trophy winner
P. K. Subban	Montreal Canadiens	James Norris Memorial Trophy winner, King Clancy Memorial Trophy winner, Three-time NHL All-Star team
Ryan O'Reilly	Colorado Avalanche	Lady Byng Memorial Trophy winner, Frank J. Selke Trophy winner, Conn Smythe Trophy winner
John Tavares	New York Islanders	First overall pick in the 2009 Draft, One-time NHL All-Star team

=== Last games ===
The following is a list of players of note who played their last NHL game in 2009–10, listed with their team:

Player	Team	Notability
Rob Blake	San Jose Sharks	6-time NHL All-Star, James Norris Memorial Trophy winner, Olympic gold medalist, over 1,200 games played.
Donald Brashear	New York Rangers	Over 1,000 games played.
Rod Brind'Amour	Carolina Hurricanes	2-time Frank J. Selke Trophy winner, NHL All-Star, over 1,400 games played.
Jonathan Cheechoo	Ottawa Senators	Maurice "Rocket" Richard Trophy winner, 1-time NHL All-Star.
Chris Chelios	Atlanta Thrashers	11-time NHL All-Star, 3-time James Norris Memorial Trophy winner, Olympic silver medalist, over 1,600 games played, oldest active player in NHL at time of retirement and second-oldest NHL player of all time.
Pavol Demitra	Vancouver Canucks	3-time NHL All-Star, Lady Byng Memorial Trophy winner.
Bill Guerin	Pittsburgh Penguins	4-time NHL All-Star, Olympic silver medalist, over 1,200 games played.
Cristobal Huet	Chicago Blackhawks	Roger Crozier Saving Grace Award winner, 1-time NHL All-Star.
Paul Kariya	St. Louis Blues	7-time NHL All-Star, Lady Byng Memorial Trophy winner, Olympic gold medalist.
Robert Lang	Phoenix Coyotes	Olympic gold and bronze medalist; 1-time NHL All-Star.
Ian Laperriere	Philadelphia Flyers	Over 1,000 games played.
Jere Lehtinen	Dallas Stars	NHL All-Star, three-time Frank J. Selke Trophy winner.
Kirk Maltby	Detroit Red Wings	Over 1,000 games played.
Brad May	Detroit Red Wings	Over 1,000 games played.
Scott Niedermayer	Anaheim Ducks	5-time NHL All-Star, Conn Smythe Trophy winner, James Norris Memorial Trophy winner, Olympic gold medalist, over 1,200 games played.
Owen Nolan	Minnesota Wild	4-time NHL All-Star, Olympic gold medalist, over 1,200 games played.
Miroslav Satan	Boston Bruins	2-time NHL All-Star, over 1000 games played.
Mathieu Schneider	Phoenix Coyotes	2-time NHL All-Star; over 1200 games played.
Darryl Sydor	St. Louis Blues	2-time NHL All-Star, over 1,200 games played.
Keith Tkachuk	St. Louis Blues	5-time NHL All-Star, Olympic silver medalist, over 1,200 games played.

== Broadcasting rights ==
=== Canada ===
This was the second season of the league's Canadian national broadcast rights deals with CBC and TSN. During the regular season, CBC continued to air Saturday night Hockey Night in Canada games while TSN aired games on Wednesdays and other selected weeknights. CBC and TSN then split the first three rounds of the playoffs, selecting the rights to individual series using a draft-like setup. The Stanley Cup Final aired exclusively on CBC.

=== United States ===
This was the fifth season of the league's U.S. national broadcast rights deals with NBC and Versus. During the regular season, Versus aired games generally on Monday and Tuesday nights, while NBC had games on selected weekends. During the playoffs, NBC had the rights to air selected weekend games during the first three postseason rounds of the Stanley Cup playoffs, while Versus televised selected first and second round playoff games and all conference finals games not aired on NBC. Due to NBC's scheduling, the network broadcast the first two and final three games of the Stanley Cup Final, while Versus broadcast games 3 and 4.

Prior to the season, a contract dispute between Versus and satellite television supplier DirecTV blacked out Versus for 14 million satellite subscribers. Versus was restored to DirecTV in March 2010. While negotiations were secret, it was reported by the media that the dispute was over the "slotting" of Versus with other channels. Versus was restored to DirecTV in the same tier of channels as the previous season. Versus President Jamie Davis confirmed that the dispute was necessary to get "the same level of distribution we had prior to be taken off the air".

== See also ==
- 2009–10 NHL transactions
- 2009–10 NHL suspensions and fines
- 2009 NHL entry draft
- 2009 in sports
- 2010 in sports
- List of 2009–10 NHL Three Star Awards
- List of National Hockey League attendance figures
