= List of 2009–10 NHL Three Star Awards =

The 2009–10 NHL Three Star Awards are the way the National Hockey League denotes its players of the week and players of the month of the 2009–10 season.

== Weekly ==
Weekly
| Week | First Star | Second Star | Third Star |
|---|---|---|---|
| October 4, 2009 | Alexander Ovechkin (Washington Capitals) | Craig Anderson (Colorado Avalanche) | Keith Tkachuk (St. Louis Blues) |
| October 11, 2009 | Dany Heatley (San Jose Sharks) | Jonathan Quick (Los Angeles Kings) | Henrik Sedin (Vancouver Canucks) |
| October 18, 2009 | Ilya Bryzgalov (Phoenix Coyotes) | Craig Anderson (Colorado Avalanche) | Alexander Ovechkin (Washington Capitals) |
| October 25, 2009 | Anze Kopitar (Los Angeles Kings) | Mike Cammalleri (Montreal Canadiens) | Patrick Marleau (San Jose Sharks) |
| November 1, 2009 | Tomas Kaberle (Toronto Maple Leafs) | Pekka Rinne (Nashville Predators) | Evgeni Nabokov (San Jose Sharks) |
| November 8, 2009 | Jarome Iginla (Calgary Flames) | Evgeni Nabokov (San Jose Sharks) | Chris Pronger (Philadelphia Flyers) |
| November 15, 2009 | Henrik Zetterberg (Detroit Red Wings) | Ilya Kovalchuk (Atlanta Thrashers) | Ryan Miller (Buffalo Sabres) |
| November 22, 2009 | Joe Thornton (San Jose Sharks) | Carey Price (Montreal Canadiens) | Mike Fisher (Ottawa Senators) |
| November 29, 2009 | Sidney Crosby (Pittsburgh Penguins) | Martin Brodeur (New Jersey Devils) | Niklas Hagman (Toronto Maple Leafs) |
| December 6, 2009 | Nicklas Backstrom (Washington Capitals) | Stephen Weiss (Florida Panthers) | Matt Duchene (Colorado Avalanche) |
| December 13, 2009 | Jonathan Quick (Los Angeles Kings) | Daniel Sedin (Vancouver Canucks) | Ilya Bryzgalov (Phoenix Coyotes) |
| December 20, 2009 | Cristobal Huet (Chicago Blackhawks) | Marc-Andre Fleury (Pittsburgh Penguins) | Patric Hornqvist (Nashville Predators) |
| December 27, 2009 | Jaroslav Halak (Montreal Canadiens) | Patrick Kane (Chicago Blackhawks) | Roberto Luongo (Vancouver Canucks) |
| January 3, 2010 | Jamie Langenbrunner (New Jersey Devils) | Mike Smith (Tampa Bay Lightning) | Loui Eriksson (Dallas Stars) |
| January 10, 2010 | Alexandre Burrows (Vancouver Canucks) | Jonas Hiller (Anaheim Ducks) | Mathieu Garon (Columbus Blue Jackets) |
| January 17, 2010 | Alexander Ovechkin (Washington Capitals) | Chris Mason (St. Louis Blues) | Guillaume Latendresse (Minnesota Wild) |
| January 24, 2010 | Brian Elliott (Ottawa Senators) | Craig Anderson (Colorado Avalanche) | Sidney Crosby (Pittsburgh Penguins) |
| January 31, 2010 | Shane Doan (Phoenix Coyotes) | Brian Elliott (Ottawa Senators) | Nicklas Backstrom (Washington Capitals) |
| February 7, 2010 | Alexander Ovechkin (Washington Capitals) | Jean-Sebastien Giguere (Toronto Maple Leafs) | Nicklas Backstrom (Washington Capitals) |
| February 14, 2010 | Steven Stamkos (Tampa Bay Lightning) | Michael Leighton (Philadelphia Flyers) | Marty Turco (Dallas Stars) |
| March 7, 2010 | Chris Stewart (Colorado Avalanche) | Steven Stamkos (Tampa Bay Lightning) | Bryan McCabe (Florida Panthers) |
| March 14, 2010 | Mikael Samuelsson (Vancouver Canucks) | Lee Stempniak (Phoenix Coyotes) | Pekka Rinne (Nashville Predators) |
| March 21, 2010 | Pekka Rinne (Nashville Predators) | John Tavares (New York Islanders) | Teemu Selanne (Anaheim Ducks) |
| March 28, 2010 | Brian Elliott (Ottawa Senators) | Jimmy Howard (Detroit Red Wings) | Ilya Kovalchuk (New Jersey Devils) |
| April 4, 2010 | Jaroslav Halak (Montreal Canadiens) | Saku Koivu (Anaheim Ducks) | Tuukka Rask (Boston Bruins) |
| April 11, 2010 | Sidney Crosby (Pittsburgh Penguins) | Eric Staal (Carolina Hurricanes) | Nicklas Backstrom (Washington Capitals) |

== Monthly ==
Monthly
| Month | First Star | Second Star | Third Star |
|---|---|---|---|
| October 2009 | Craig Anderson (Colorado Avalanche) | Alexander Ovechkin (Washington Capitals) | Ilya Bryzgalov (Phoenix Coyotes) |
| November 2009 | Jarome Iginla (Calgary Flames) | Joe Thornton (San Jose Sharks) | Marian Gaborik (New York Rangers) |
| December 2009 | Henrik Sedin (Vancouver Canucks) | Ilya Bryzgalov (Phoenix Coyotes) | Patrick Kane (Chicago Blackhawks) |
| January 2010 | Alexander Ovechkin (Washington Capitals) | Henrik Sedin (Vancouver Canucks) | Tomas Vokoun (Florida Panthers) |
| March 2010 | Lee Stempniak (Phoenix Coyotes) | Jimmy Howard (Detroit Red Wings) | Henrik Sedin (Vancouver Canucks) |

== Rookie of the Month ==
Rookie of the Month
| Month | Player |
|---|---|
| October 2009 | Michael Del Zotto (New York Rangers) |
| November 2009 | James van Riemsdyk (Philadelphia Flyers) |
| December 2009 | Matt Duchene (Colorado Avalanche) |
| January 2010 | Tyler Myers (Buffalo Sabres) |
| March 2010 | Jimmy Howard (Detroit Red Wings) |

== See also ==
- 2009–10 NHL season
- Three stars (ice hockey)
- Georgia’s Own Credit Union 3 Stars of the Year Award, awarded annually to a player on the Atlanta Thrashers, based on "Three Stars" achievements
- Molson Cup, awarded annually to a player on each of the six Canadian hockey teams, given out based on "Three Stars" achievements
- Toyota Cup, awarded annually to a player on the Philadelphia Flyers, based on "Three Stars" achievements
- NHL All-Star team
