= Pascal Morency =

Canadian ice hockey player

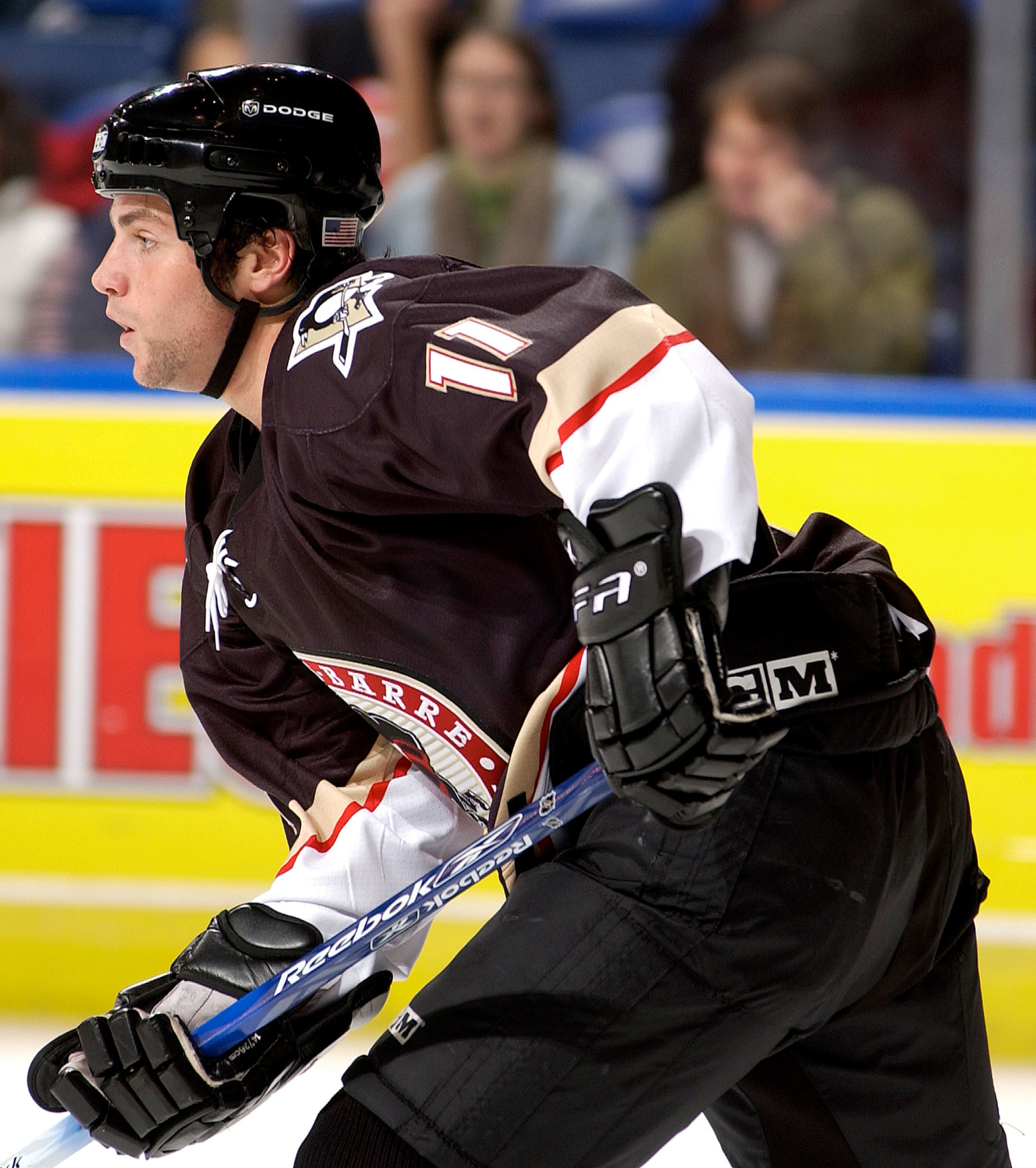
- Morency with the Wilkes-Barre/Scranton Penguins in 2004
- Born: February 20, 1982 (age 43) Montreal, Quebec, Canada
- Height: 5 ft 10 in (178 cm)
- Weight: 196 lb (89 kg; 14 st 0 lb)
- Position: Right wing
- Shot: Right
- Played for: Wilkes-Barre/Scranton Penguins; Bridgeport Sound Tigers; Houston Aeros; Wheeling Nailers; Bakersfield Condors; KHL Medvescak Zagreb; HDD Olimpija Ljubljana; Sheffield Steelers
- NHL draft: Undrafted
- Playing career: 2003–2014

Pascal Morency (born February 20, 1982) is a Canadian former professional ice hockey forward.

== Playing career ==
Morency originally started his junior career in the Quebec Major Junior Hockey League with the Chicoutimi Saguenéens in 1999. He played only 12 games before going to the Cape Breton Screaming Eagles for the rest of the 1999–2000 season and played there until 2002. During that period his team went to the playoffs every year that he played.

2001-02 was his final season with the Screaming Eagles, and that year he had a QMJHL league leading 596 penalty minutes and had his highest points year with 11 goals and 22 assists for 33 points.

In the 2002-03 season he played four games for the Hull Olympiques and finished the season with the Rouyn-Noranda Huskies both of the QMJHL. During his time with the Huskies he tallied 12 goals and 16 assists along with 340 penalty minutes.

He turned professional in 2003 and played in the United Hockey League for the Flint Generals during that season 8 goals and 6 assists to go along with his 248 penalty minutes.

In the 2004-05 season he joined the Pittsburgh Penguins association and was assigned to the Wheeling Nailers of the ECHL. While there he accumulated 17 points and had 252 penalty minutes. He was called up to the Wilkes-Barre/Scranton Penguins of the AHL and played 2 games.

In the 2005-06 season he was re-signed by the Wilkes-Barre/Scranton Penguins and assigned to the Nailers, but played only 17 games and was released from his contract.

In the 2006–07 season he played for the Fort Wayne Komets then of the UHL. During that season he accrued 204 penalty minutes in the regular season and 16 in the post season.

From the 2007-08 season until the 2009-10 season, Morency played for the Bridgeport Sound Tigers of the American Hockey League (AHL). During those seasons he played the fewest games per season in his professional career and accrued the fewest penalty minutes per season. In 2009, while at the New York Islanders summer training camp, he was involved in a fight where he was suspended for five preseason games and five regular season games.

For the 2010-11 season, he was signed to a two way contract by the Houston Aeros of the AHL, but was assigned to the Bakersfield Condors of the ECHL. He was recalled a number of times to Houston and played in 16 games with 2 points and 70 penalty minutes. While in Bakersfield, Morency played 36 regular season games with 27 points and 113 penalty minutes. The Condors were eliminated in the first round of the 2011 Kelly Cup playoffs, where he played in 3 games and had 4 points and 6 penalty minutes.

== Career statistics ==
			Regular season					Playoffs
Season	Team	League	GP	G	A	Pts	PIM	GP	G	A	Pts	PIM
1999–2000	Chicoutimi Saguenéens	QMJHL	12	0	1	1	9	—	—	—	—	—
1999–2000	Cape Breton Screaming Eagles	QMJHL	37	2	3	5	35	1	0	0	0	0
2000–01	Cape Breton Screaming Eagles	QMJHL	32	3	5	8	79	12	1	5	6	29
2001–02	Cape Breton Screaming Eagles	QMJHL	64	11	22	33	596	16	1	3	4	77
2002–03	Hull Olympiques	QMJHL	4	0	0	0	65	—	—	—	—	—
2002–03	Rouyn-Noranda Huskies	QMJHL	61	12	16	28	340	4	1	2	3	12
2003–04	Flint Generals	UHL	51	8	6	14	248	3	0	0	0	0
2004–05	Wheeling Nailers	ECHL	53	8	9	17	252	—	—	—	—	—
2004–05	Wilkes-Barre/Scranton Penguins	AHL	2	0	0	0	4	—	—	—	—	—
2005–06	Wheeling Nailers	ECHL	17	1	2	3	74	—	—	—	—	—
2006–07	Fort Wayne Komets	UHL	68	10	14	24	204	10	3	3	6	16
2007–08	Bridgeport Sound Tigers	AHL	28	1	1	2	114	—	—	—	—	—
2008–09	Bridgeport Sound Tigers	AHL	31	1	2	3	115	3	0	1	1	4
2009–10	Bridgeport Sound Tigers	AHL	46	2	1	3	187	—	—	—	—	—
2010–11	Bakersfield Condors	ECHL	36	17	10	27	113	3	3	1	4	6
2010–11	Houston Aeros	AHL	16	1	1	2	70	—	—	—	—	—
2011–12	KHL Medvescak Zagreb	EBEL	26	8	7	15	162	—	—	—	—	—
2012–13	Arizona Sundogs	CHL	13	3	5	8	27	—	—	—	—	—
2013–14	HDD Olimpija Ljubljana	EBEL	35	3	7	10	75	—	—	—	—	—
2014–15	Sheffield Steelers	EIHL	1	0	0	0	0	—	—	—	—	—
ECHL totals			116	26	21	47	439	3	3	1	4	6
AHL totals			123	5	5	10	490	3	0	0	1	4
