= 2009–10 New York Rangers season =

NHL hockey team season

2009–10 New York Rangers
- Division: 4th Atlantic
- Conference: 9th Eastern
- 2009–10 record: 38–33–11
- Home record: 18–17–6
- Road record: 20–16–5
- Goals for: 222
- Goals against: 218

Team information
- General manager: Glen Sather
- Coach: John Tortorella
- Captain: Chris Drury
- Alternate captains: Ryan Callahan; Vaclav Prospal (Nov.–Apr.)
- Arena: Madison Square Garden
- Average attendance: 18,200

Team leaders
- Goals: Marian Gaborik (42)
- Assists: Marian Gaborik (44)
- Points: Marian Gaborik (86)
- Penalty minutes: Sean Avery (160)
- Plus/minus: Marian Gaborik (+15)
- Wins: Henrik Lundqvist (35)
- Goals against average: Lundqvist (2.41)

The 2009–10 New York Rangers season was the franchise's 83rd season of play and their 84th season overall. For the first time in five years, the Rangers failed to qualify for the Stanley Cup playoffs after falling to the Philadelphia Flyers in each team's last game with the winner clinching the final Eastern Conference playoff spot and the loser being eliminated. This is the first time since the 2003–04 season and the only season the Rangers missed the playoffs between 2005–06 and 2016–17.

== Off-season ==
On May 4, 2009, Markus Naslund announced that he would be retiring from professional hockey after playing one season for the Rangers.

At the NHL entry draft, the Rangers chose Chris Kreider with their first-round pick, 19th overall. The Rangers followed this with a couple of trades at the draft to acquire Brian Boyle and Chad Johnson. A bigger splash was made a few days later when the Rangers traded Scott Gomez to the Montreal Canadiens. With Gomez's $7 million contract gone, the Rangers then signed free agent Marian Gaborik on July 1, the first day of free agency. On July 16, the Rangers announced that Mike Sullivan had been hired as an assistant coach.

On August 16, 2009, Mark Messier rejoined the Rangers organization as a special assistant to general manager Glen Sather.

== Pre-season ==
2009 pre-season game log: 3–3–1 (Home: 2–1–0; Road: 1–2–1)
#	Date	Opponent	Score	Decision	Record
1	September 15	Boston Bruins	2–1	Zaba	0–1–0
2	September 16	@ New Jersey Devils	3–2 SO	Johnson	0–1–1
3	September 18	@ Detroit Red Wings	4–3	Zaba	0–2–1
4	September 19	@ Boston Bruins	5–2	Valiquette	1–2–1
5	September 21	Detroit Red Wings	4–2	Lundqvist	2–2–1
6	September 24	Washington Capitals	3–2	Lundqvist	3–2–1
7	September 27	@ Washington Capitals	4–3	Lundqvist	3–3–1

== Regular season ==
The NHL took a two-week break from February 15 to March 1 for the Olympics. The Rangers had five players represent their countries; Chris Drury and Ryan Callahan for the United States, Marian Gaborik for Slovakia, Olli Jokinen for Finland and Henrik Lundqvist for Sweden.

=== Divisional standings ===
Atlantic Division
		GP	W	L	OTL	GF	GA	Pts
**1**	**New Jersey Devils**	**82**	**48**	**27**	**7**	**222**	**191**	**103**
**2**	**Pittsburgh Penguins**	**82**	**47**	**28**	**7**	**257**	**237**	**101**
**3**	**Philadelphia Flyers**	**82**	**41**	**35**	**6**	**236**	**225**	**88**
4	New York Rangers	82	38	33	11	222	218	87
5	New York Islanders	82	34	37	11	222	264	79

=== Conference standings ===
Eastern Conference
R		Div	GP	W	L	OTL	GF	GA	Pts
**1**	**p – Washington Capitals**	**SE**	**82**	**54**	**15**	**13**	**318**	**233**	121
**2**	**y – New Jersey Devils**	**AT**	**82**	**48**	**27**	**7**	**222**	**191**	103
**3**	**y – Buffalo Sabres**	**NE**	**82**	**45**	**27**	**10**	**235**	**207**	100
**4**	**Pittsburgh Penguins**	**AT**	**82**	**47**	**28**	**7**	**257**	**237**	101
**5**	**Ottawa Senators**	**NE**	**82**	**44**	**32**	**6**	**225**	**238**	94
**6**	**Boston Bruins**	**NE**	**82**	**39**	**30**	**13**	**206**	**200**	91
**7**	**Philadelphia Flyers**	**AT**	**82**	**41**	**35**	**6**	**236**	**225**	88
**8**	**Montreal Canadiens**	**NE**	**82**	**39**	**33**	**10**	**217**	**223**	88
8.5
9	New York Rangers	AT	82	38	33	11	222	218	87
10	Atlanta Thrashers	SE	82	35	34	13	234	256	83
11	Carolina Hurricanes	SE	82	35	37	10	230	256	80
12	Tampa Bay Lightning	SE	82	34	36	12	217	260	80
13	New York Islanders	AT	82	34	37	11	222	264	79
14	Florida Panthers	SE	82	32	37	13	208	244	77
15	Toronto Maple Leafs	NE	82	30	38	14	214	267	74

bold – Qualified for playoffs; y – Won division; p – Won Presidents' Trophy (and division)

AT – Atlantic Division, NE – Northeast Division, SE – Southeast Division

== Schedule and results ==
Win (2 points) Loss (0 points) Overtime/shootout loss (1 point)

2009–10 game log
October: 8–5–1 (Home: 5–2–0; Road: 3–3–1)

Game	October	Opponent	Score	Decision	Record
1	2	@ Pittsburgh Penguins	3–2	Lundqvist	0–1–0
2	3	Ottawa Senators	5–2	Lundqvist	1–1–0
3	5	@ New Jersey Devils	3–2	Lundqvist	2–1–0
4	8	@ Washington Capitals	4–3	Lundqvist	3–1–0
5	11	Anaheim Ducks	3–0	Valiquette	4–1–0
6	12	Toronto Maple Leafs	7–2	Lundqvist	5–1–0
7	14	Los Angeles Kings	4–2	Lundqvist	6–1–0
8	17	@ Toronto Maple Leafs	4–1	Lundqvist	7–1–0
9	19	San Jose Sharks	7–3	Valiquette	7–2–0
10	22	New Jersey Devils	4–2	Lundqvist	7–3–0
11	24	@ Montreal Canadiens	5–4 OT	Lundqvist	7–3–1
12	26	Phoenix Coyotes	5–2	Lundqvist	8–3–1
13	28	@ New York Islanders	3–1	Lundqvist	8–4–1
14	30	@ Minnesota Wild	3–2	Lundqvist	8–5–1

November: 5–8–0 (Home: 2–4–0; Road: 3–4–0)

Game	November	Opponent	Score	Decision	Record
15	1	Boston Bruins	1–0	Lundqvist	9–5–1
16	3	@ Vancouver Canucks	4–1	Lundqvist	9–6–1
17	5	@ Edmonton Oilers	4–2	Valiquette	10–6–1
18	7	@ Calgary Flames	3–1	Valiquette	10–7–1
19	12	Atlanta Thrashers	5–3	Lundqvist	10–8–1
20	14	@ Ottawa Senators	2–1 SO	Lundqvist	11–8–1
21	17	Washington Capitals	4–2	Lundqvist	11–9–1
22	21	Florida Panthers	3–2	Lundqvist	11–10–1
23	23	Columbus Blue Jackets	7–4	Lundqvist	12–10–1
24	25	@ Florida Panthers	2–1 SO	Lundqvist	13–10–1
25	27	@ Tampa Bay Lightning	5–1	Lundqvist	13–11–1
26	28	@ Pittsburgh Penguins	8–3	Valiquette	13–12–1
27	30	Pittsburgh Penguins	5–2	Lundqvist	13–13–1

December: 6–4–3 (Home: 1–4–2; Road: 5–0–1)

Game	December	Opponent	Score	Decision	Record
28	5	@ Buffalo Sabres	2–1	Lundqvist	14–13–1
29	6	Detroit Red Wings	3–1	Lundqvist	14–14–1
30	9	@ Chicago Blackhawks	2–1 OT	Lundqvist	14–14–2
31	12	Buffalo Sabres	3–2	Lundqvist	14–15–2
32	14	Atlanta Thrashers	3–2 SO	Lundqvist	14–15–3
33	16	New York Islanders	2–1	Lundqvist	14–16–3
34	17	@ New York Islanders	5–2	Lundqvist	15–16–3
35	19	@ Philadelphia Flyers	2–1	Lundqvist	16–16–3
36	21	@ Carolina Hurricanes	3–1	Lundqvist	17–16–3
37	23	Florida Panthers	4–1	Lundqvist	18–16–3
38	26	New York Islanders	3–2 OT	Lundqvist	18–16–4
39	30	Philadelphia Flyers	6–0	Lundqvist	18–17–4
40	31	@ Carolina Hurricanes	2–1	Lundqvist	19–17–4

January: 6–7–3 (Home: 4–3–2; Road: 2–4–1)

Game	January	Opponent	Score	Decision	Record
41	2	Carolina Hurricanes	2–1 OT	Lundqvist	19–17–5
42	4	Boston Bruins	3–2	Lundqvist	20–17–5
43	6	Dallas Stars	5–2	Lundqvist	21–17–5
44	7	@ Atlanta Thrashers	2–1 SO	Johnson	21–17–6
45	9	@ Boston Bruins	3–1	Lundqvist	22–17–6
46	12	New Jersey Devils	1–0 SO	Lundqvist	22–17–7
47	14	Ottawa Senators	2–0	Lundqvist	22–18–7
48	16	@ St. Louis Blues	4–1	Johnson	22–19–7
49	17	Montreal Canadiens	6–2	Lundqvist	23–19–7
50	19	Tampa Bay Lightning	8–2	Lundqvist	24–19–7
51	21	@ Philadelphia Flyers	2–0	Lundqvist	24–20–7
52	23	@ Montreal Canadiens	6–0	Lundqvist	24–21–7
53	25	Pittsburgh Penguins	4–2	Lundqvist	24–22–7
54	27	Carolina Hurricanes	5–1	Lundqvist	24–23–7
55	30	@ Phoenix Coyotes	3–2	Johnson	24–24–7
56	31	@ Colorado Avalanche	3–1	Johnson	25–24–7

February: 3–3–0 (Home: 2–2–0; Road: 1–1–0)

Game	February	Opponent	Score	Decision	Record
57	2	@ Los Angeles Kings	2–1	Lundqvist	25–25–7
58	4	Washington Capitals	6–5	Lundqvist	25–26–7
59	6	New Jersey Devils	3–1	Lundqvist	26–26–7
60	10	Nashville Predators	2–1	Lundqvist	26–27–7
61	12	@ Pittsburgh Penguins	3–2 OT	Lundqvist	27–27–7
62	14	Tampa Bay Lightning	5–2	Lundqvist	28–27–7

March: 6–5–3 (Home: 2–2–2; Road: 4–3–1)

Game	March	Opponent	Score	Decision	Record
63	2	@ Ottawa Senators	4–1	Lundqvist	29–27–7
64	4	Pittsburgh Penguins	5–4 OT	Lundqvist	29–27–8
65	6	@ Washington Capitals	2–0	Auld	29–28–8
66	7	Buffalo Sabres	2–1 OT	Lundqvist	29–28–9
67	10	@ New Jersey Devils	6–3	Lundqvist	29–29–9
68	12	@ Atlanta Thrashers	5–2	Lundqvist	30–29–9
69	14	Philadelphia Flyers	3–1	Lundqvist	31–29–9
70	16	Montreal Canadiens	3–1	Lundqvist	31–30–9
71	18	St. Louis Blues	4–3	Lundqvist	31–31–9
72	21	@ Boston Bruins	2–1	Lundqvist	31–32–9
73	24	New York Islanders	5–0	Lundqvist	32–32–9
74	25	@ New Jersey Devils	4–3 SO	Lundqvist	33–32–9
75	27	@ Toronto Maple Leafs	3–2 OT	Lundqvist	33–32–10
76	30	@ New York Islanders	4–3	Lundqvist	34–32–10

April: 4–1–1 (Home: 2–0–0; Road: 2–1–1)

Game	April	Opponent	Score	Decision	Record
77	2	@ Tampa Bay Lightning	5–0	Lundqvist	35–32–10
78	3	@ Florida Panthers	4–1	Lundqvist	36–32–10
79	6	@ Buffalo Sabres	5–2	Lundqvist	36–33–10
80	7	Toronto Maple Leafs	5–1	Lundqvist	37–33–10
81	9	Philadelphia Flyers	4–3	Lundqvist	38–33–10
82	11	@ Philadelphia Flyers	2–1 SO	Lundqvist	38–33–11

== Playoffs ==
The New York Rangers failed to qualify for the 2010 Stanley Cup playoffs, despite going 7–1–2 at the end of the season. Their run set up a home and home series with the seventh place Philadelphia Flyers, but the Rangers fell to the Flyers in a shootout in the final game of the season and finished one point out of the playoffs.

== Player statistics ==
Skaters

Regular season
Player	GP	G	A	Pts	+/−	PIM
Marian Gaborik	76	42	44	86	15	37
Vaclav Prospal	75	20	38	58	8	32
Brandon Dubinsky	69	20	24	44	9	54
Michael Del Zotto	80	9	28	37	−20	32
Ryan Callahan	77	19	18	37	−12	48
Chris Drury	77	14	18	32	−10	31
Sean Avery	69	11	20	31	0	160
Artem Anisimov	82	12	16	28	−2	32
Marc Staal	82	8	19	27	11	44
Erik Christensen^{†}	49	8	18	26	14	24
Daniel Girardi	82	6	18	24	−2	53
Michal Rozsival	82	3	20	23	3	78
Ales Kotalik^{‡}	45	8	14	22	−18	38
Matt Gilroy	69	4	11	15	0	23
Olli Jokinen^{†}	26	4	11	15	1	22
Wade Redden	75	2	12	14	8	27
Enver Lisin	57	6	8	14	−1	18
Chris Higgins^{‡}	55	6	8	14	−9	32
Brandon Prust^{†}	26	4	5	9	3	65
P. A. Parenteau	22	3	5	8	−2	4
Aaron Voros	41	3	4	7	−2	89
Brian Boyle	71	4	2	6	−6	47
Jody Shelley^{†}	21	2	4	6	4	37
Anders Eriksson^{†}	8	0	2	2	2	0
Donald Brashear	36	0	1	1	−9	73
Dane Byers	5	1	0	1	1	31
Corey Locke	3	0	0	0	1	0
Corey Potter	3	0	0	0	0	2
Bobby Sanguinetti	5	0	0	0	0	4
Ilkka Heikkinen	7	0	0	0	2	0

Goaltenders

Regular season
Player	GP	TOI	W	L	OT	GA	GAA	SA	SV%	SO	G	A	PIM
Henrik Lundqvist	73	4204	35	27	10	167	2.38	2109	.921	4	0	1	0
Steve Valiquette	6	305	2	3	0	19	3.74	128	.852	1	0	0	0
Chad Johnson	5	281	1	2	1	11	2.35	135	.919	0	0	1	0
Alex Auld^{†}	3	119	0	1	0	5	2.52	52	.904	0	0	0	0
Matt Zaba	1	34	0	0	0	2	3.53	16	.875	0	0	0	0

^{†}Denotes player spent time with another team before joining Rangers. Stats reflect time with Rangers only.
^{‡}Traded mid-season. Stats reflect time with Rangers only.

== Awards and records ==
=== Awards ===
Regular season
Player	Award	Reached
Michael Del Zotto	NHL Rookie of the Month	October 2009
Marian Gaborik	NHL Third Star of the Month	November 2009

=== Milestones ===
Regular season
Player	Milestone	Reached
Matt Gilroy	1st NHL game	October 2, 2009
Michael Del Zotto	1st NHL game	October 2, 2009
Michael Del Zotto	1st NHL goal 1st NHL point	October 3, 2009
Vaclav Prospal	600th NHL point	October 3, 2009
Daniel Girardi	200th NHL game	October 3, 2009
Michael Del Zotto	1st NHL assist	October 5, 2009
Matt Gilroy	1st NHL goal 1st NHL point	October 5, 2009
Artem Anisimov	1st NHL assist 1st NHL point	October 8, 2009
Artem Anisimov	1st NHL goal	October 11, 2009
Vaclav Prospal	200th NHL goal	October 14, 2009
Chris Drury	800th NHL game	October 19, 2009
Matt Gilroy	1st NHL assist	October 19, 2009
P. A. Parenteau	1st NHL goal	October 28, 2009
Dane Byers	1st NHL goal 1st NHL point	October 30, 2009
Henrik Lundqvist	150th NHL win	November 1, 2009
Donald Brashear	1,000th NHL game	November 12, 2009
Chris Higgins	300th NHL game	November 12, 2009
Enver Lisin	100th NHL game	November 23, 2009
Bobby Sanguinetti	1st NHL game	November 27, 2009
Sean Avery	200th NHL point	November 28, 2009
Vaclav Prospal	900th NHL game	November 28, 2009
Ilkka Heikkinen	1st NHL game	December 5, 2009
Marc Staal	200th NHL game	December 26, 2009
Chad Johnson	1st NHL game	December 30, 2009
Henrik Lundqvist	300th NHL game	December 30, 2009
Erik Christensen	100th NHL point	December 31, 2009
John Tortorella	600th NHL game coached	December 31, 2009
Brandon Dubinsky	100th NHL point	January 4, 2010
Brandon Dubinsky	200th NHL game	January 6, 2010
Chad Johnson	1st NHL assist 1st NHL point	January 7, 2010
Michal Rozsival	600th NHL game	January 9, 2010
Matt Zaba	1st NHL game	January 23, 2010
Ryan Callahan	200th NHL game	January 25, 2010
Chad Johnson	1st NHL win	January 31, 2010
Marian Gaborik	500th NHL point	January 31, 2010
Chris Drury	600th NHL point	February 14, 2010
Brian Boyle	100th NHL game	March 7, 2010
Brandon Prust	100th NHL game	March 10, 2010

== Transactions ==
The Rangers have been involved in the following transactions during the 2009–10 season.

=== Trades ===
Date	Details
June 27, 2009	To Los Angeles Kings 3rd-round pick in 2010	To New York Rangers Brian Boyle
June 27, 2009	To Pittsburgh Penguins 5th-round pick in 2009	To New York Rangers Chad Johnson
June 30, 2009	To Montreal Canadiens Scott Gomez; Tom Pyatt; Michael Busto	To New York Rangers Chris Higgins; Ryan McDonagh; Pavel Valentenko; Doug Janik
July 13, 2009	To Phoenix Coyotes Lauri Korpikoski	To New York Rangers Enver Lisin
July 16, 2009	To Colorado Avalanche Brian Fahey	To New York Rangers Nigel Williams
February 1, 2010	To Calgary Flames Chris Higgins; Ales Kotalik	To New York Rangers Olli Jokinen; Brandon Prust
February 12, 2010	To San Jose Sharks Conditional 6th-round draft pick in 2011	To New York Rangers Jody Shelley
March 3, 2010	To Detroit Red Wings Jordan Owens	To New York Rangers Kris Newbury
March 3, 2010	To Phoenix Coyotes Miika Wiikman; 7th-round pick in 2011	To New York Rangers Anders Eriksson

|}

=== Free agents acquired ===
Player	Former team	Contract terms
Paul Crowder	University of Alaska Anchorage	undisclosed
Matt Gilroy	Boston University	2 years, $3.5 million
Andres Ambuhl	HC Davos	undisclosed
Ilkka Heikkinen	HIFK	undisclosed
Donald Brashear	Washington Capitals	2 years, $2.8 million
Marian Gaborik	Minnesota Wild	5 years, $37.5 million
Tyler Arnason	Colorado Avalanche	2-way contract
Corey Locke	Houston Aeros	undisclosed
Ales Kotalik	Edmonton Oilers	3 years, $9 million
Sam Klassen	Saskatoon Blades	undisclosed
Vaclav Prospal	Tampa Bay Lightning	1 year, $1.1 million
Lee Baldwin	University of Alaska Anchorage	undisclosed
Cam Talbot	University of Alabama in Huntsville	undisclosed

=== Free agents lost ===
Player	New team	Contract terms
Colton Orr	Toronto Maple Leafs	4 years, $4 million
Nik Antropov	Atlanta Thrashers	4 years, $16 million
Fredrik Sjostrom	Calgary Flames	2 years, $1.5 million
Greg Moore	New York Islanders	1 year, 2-way contract
Doug Janik	Detroit Red Wings	1 year, 2-way contract
Paul Mara	Montreal Canadiens	1 year, $1.675 million
Derek Morris	Boston Bruins	1 year, $3.3 million
Blair Betts	Philadelphia Flyers	1 year, $550,000
Nikolay Zherdev	Atlant Mytishchi	1 year

=== Claimed via waivers ===
Player	Former team	Date claimed off waivers
Erik Christensen	Anaheim Ducks	December 2, 2009
Alex Auld	Dallas Stars	February 27, 2010

=== Lost via waivers ===
Player	New team	Date claimed off waivers

=== Lost via retirement ===
Player
Markus Naslund

=== Player signings ===
Player	Contract terms
Matt Zaba	undisclosed
Michael Del Zotto	undisclosed
Jordan Owens	undisclosed
P. A. Parenteau	undisclosed
Chris Higgins	1 year, $2.25 million
Brian Boyle	2 years, $1.05 million
Dane Byers	undisclosed
Chad Johnson	undisclosed
Ryan Callahan	2 years, $4.6 million
Corey Potter	1 year, $550,000
Enver Lisin	1 year, $790,000
Brandon Dubinsky	2 years, $3.7 million

== Draft picks ==
New York's picks at the 2009 NHL entry draft in Montreal, Canada, at the Bell Centre.

Round	#	Player	Position	Nationality	College/Junior/Club team (League)
1	19	Chris Kreider	LW	United States	Phillips Andover (USHS-MA)
2	47 (compensatory)	Ethan Werek	C	Canada	Kingston Frontenacs (OHL)
3	80	Ryan Bourque	C	United States	U.S. National Team Development Program (USHL)
5	127 (from Phoenix)	Roman Horak	C	Czech Republic	České Budějovice Mountfield Jr. (Czech Extraliga-Jr)
5	140	Scott Stajcer	G	Canada	Owen Sound Attack (OHL)
6	170	Daniel Maggio	D	Canada	Sudbury Wolves (OHL)
7	200	Mikhail Pashnin	D	Russia	Mechel Chelyabinsk (Russia-2)

* On March 11, 2009, the NHL general managers agreed to award the 17th selection of the second round as a compensatory pick to the New York Rangers for deceased player Alexei Cherepanov.

== See also ==
- 2009–10 NHL season

== Farm teams ==
=== Hartford Wolf Pack (AHL) ===
The 2009–10 season will be the 13th season of AHL hockey for the franchise.

=== Charlotte Checkers (ECHL) ===
The 2009–10 season will be the 17th and final season of ECHL hockey for the franchise, as their place will be taken by an American Hockey League team of the same name (currently known as the Albany River Rats) for the 2010–11 season.
