= 2009–10 New York Islanders season =

NHL hockey team season

2009–10 New York Islanders
- Division: 5th Atlantic
- Conference: 13th Eastern
- 2009–10 record: 34–37–11
- Home record: 23–14–4
- Road record: 11–23–7
- Goals for: 222
- Goals against: 264

Team information
- General manager: Garth Snow
- Coach: Scott Gordon
- Captain: Doug Weight
- Alternate captains: Kyle Okposo; Richard Park; Mark Streit; Brendan Witt (Oct.–Jan.)
- Arena: Nassau Veterans Memorial Coliseum
- Average attendance: 12,725 (78.4% capacity)

Team leaders
- Goals: Matt Moulson (30)
- Assists: Mark Streit (38)
- Points: John Tavares (54)
- Penalty minutes: Tim Jackman (98)
- Plus/minus: Josh Bailey (+5)
- Wins: Dwayne Roloson (23)
- Goals against average: Dwayne Roloson (3.00)

The 2009–10 New York Islanders season was the 38th season in the National Hockey League (NHL) franchise's history. Following the trade of Bill Guerin during the 2008–09 season, the Islanders named center Doug Weight the team's new captain. Kyle Okposo, Richard Park, Mark Streit and Brendan Witt served as the team's alternate captains. The year opened with the 2009 NHL entry draft on June 26–27, with the Islanders using their first selection in the draft to select John Tavares.

== Preseason ==
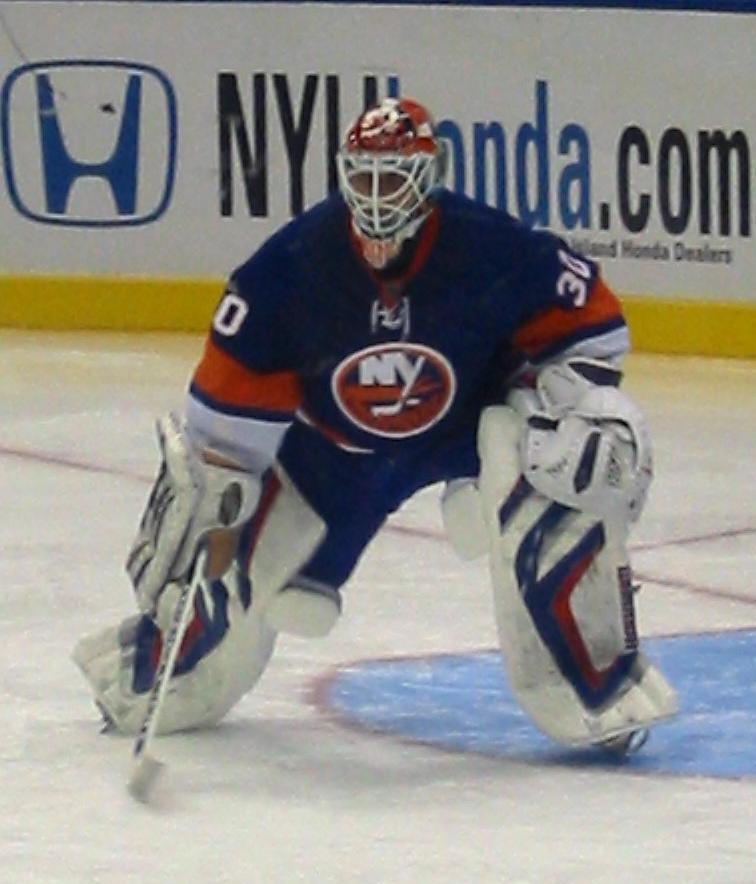
Dwayne Roloson served as the Islanders' goalie in only their last preseason game: a 2–4 loss to the New Jersey Devils.

Before the regular season began, the New York Islanders played a series of exhibition games. Only one game was held at Nassau Coliseum, in which the Islanders lost to the New Jersey Devils 2–4. Their first exhibition game was held on September 14, when the Islanders were defeated 2–1 by the Vancouver Canucks. The Islanders played two games at the place they held their training camp, the Credit Union Centre in Saskatoon, Saskatchewan. They won the two games held there, defeating the Flames on September 19 and the Oilers on September 20. As previously expected, the Islanders played one game in the new Sprint Center in Kansas City against the Los Angeles Kings, in which the Islanders lost 2–4. The team's final exhibition game was on September 29 against the Devils at the Prudential Center in Newark, where they again lost 2–4.

Forward Doug Weight is named team captain.

2009 Preseason Game Log

September: 2-4-1 (Home: 0–1–0; Road: 0–1–1; Neutral 2–2–0)
#	Date	Visitor	Score	Home	OT	Decision	Attendance	Record	Pts
1	September 14 (in Terrace, BC)	NY Islanders	1-2	Vancouver Canucks		Nathan Lawson (0–1–0)	1,200	0–1–0	0
2	September 16	NY Islanders	2-3	Edmonton Oilers		Nathan Lawson (0–2–0)	16,386	0–2–0	0
3	September 17	NY Islanders	4-5	Calgary Flames	SO	Kevin Poulin (0–0–1)	19,289	0–2–1	1
4	September 19 (in Saskatoon, SK)	Calgary Flames	2-4	NY Islanders		Kevin Poulin (1–0–1)	12,833	1–2–1	3
5	September 20 (in Saskatoon, SK)	Edmonton Oilers	1-3	NY Islanders		Martin Biron (1–0–0)	12,842	2–2–1	5
6	September 22 (in Kansas City, Missouri)	NY Islanders	2-4	Los Angeles Kings		Nathan Lawson (0–3–0)	9,792	2–3–1	5
7	September 23	New Jersey Devils	4-2	NY Islanders		Martin Biron (1–1–0)	8,256	2–4–1	5
8	September 29	NY Islanders	2-4	New Jersey Devils		Dwayne Roloson (0–1–0)		2–5–1	5

Legend: Win (2 points) Loss (0 points) Overtime/shootout loss (1 point)

== Regular season ==
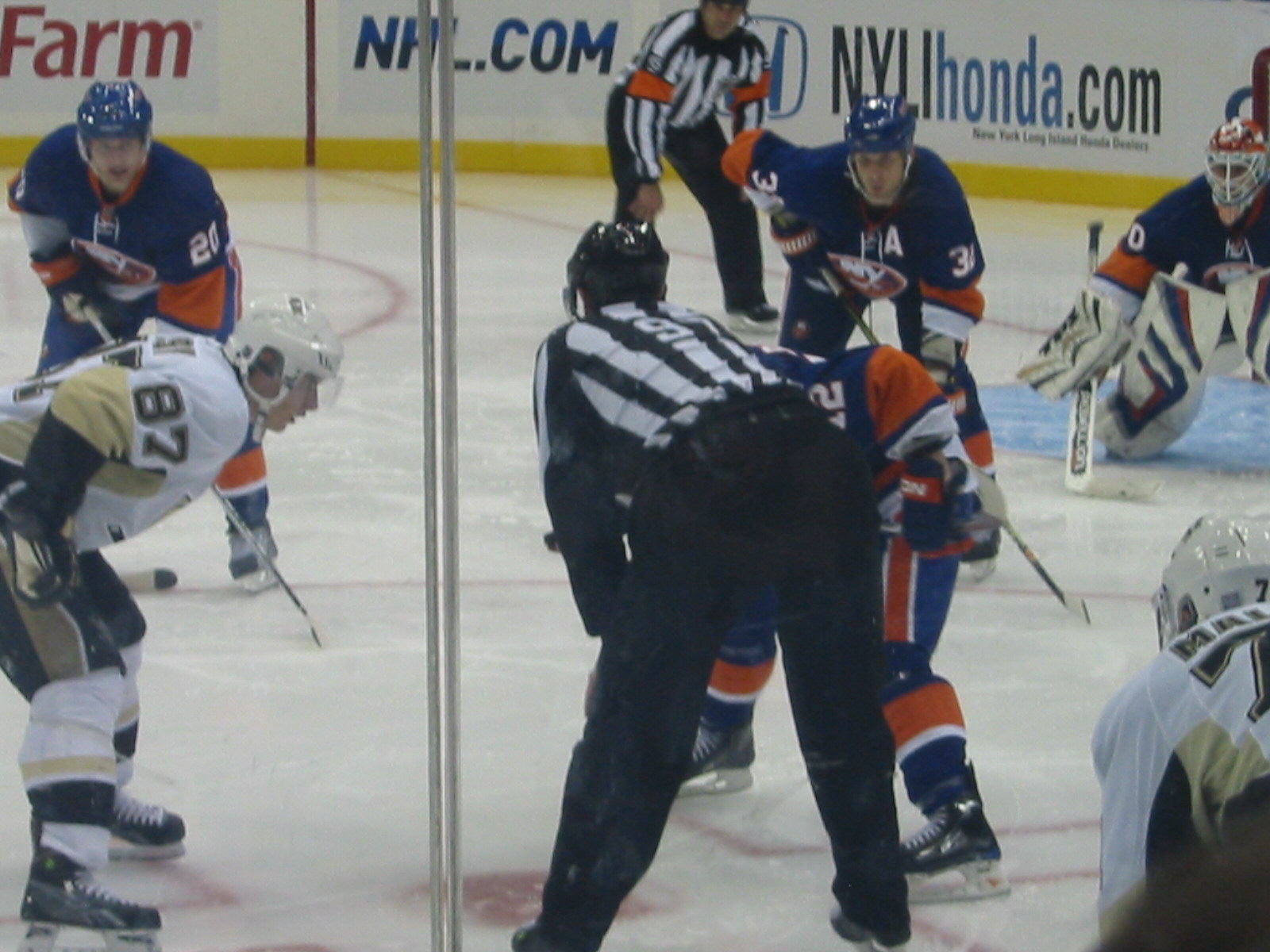
The Islanders' Josh Bailey faces off against the Penguins' Sidney Crosby during the Islanders' 2009–10 season home-opener.

On July 15, 2009, the Islanders released their regular season schedule, in which the Islanders play a regular number of 82 games, 41 home and 41 away. The team's first game was against the defending Stanley Cup champions, the Pittsburgh Penguins, on October 3, 2009, at Nassau Coliseum, in which the Islanders lost in a shootout, 4–3.

The Islanders missed the playoffs for the second straight year.

=== Divisional standings ===
Atlantic Division
		GP	W	L	OTL	GF	GA	Pts
**1**	**New Jersey Devils**	**82**	**48**	**27**	**7**	**222**	**191**	**103**
**2**	**Pittsburgh Penguins**	**82**	**47**	**28**	**7**	**257**	**237**	**101**
**3**	**Philadelphia Flyers**	**82**	**41**	**35**	**6**	**236**	**225**	**88**
4	New York Rangers	82	38	33	11	222	218	87
5	New York Islanders	82	34	37	11	222	264	79

=== Conference standings ===
Eastern Conference
R		Div	GP	W	L	OTL	GF	GA	Pts
**1**	**p – Washington Capitals**	**SE**	**82**	**54**	**15**	**13**	**318**	**233**	121
**2**	**y – New Jersey Devils**	**AT**	**82**	**48**	**27**	**7**	**222**	**191**	103
**3**	**y – Buffalo Sabres**	**NE**	**82**	**45**	**27**	**10**	**235**	**207**	100
**4**	**Pittsburgh Penguins**	**AT**	**82**	**47**	**28**	**7**	**257**	**237**	101
**5**	**Ottawa Senators**	**NE**	**82**	**44**	**32**	**6**	**225**	**238**	94
**6**	**Boston Bruins**	**NE**	**82**	**39**	**30**	**13**	**206**	**200**	91
**7**	**Philadelphia Flyers**	**AT**	**82**	**41**	**35**	**6**	**236**	**225**	88
**8**	**Montreal Canadiens**	**NE**	**82**	**39**	**33**	**10**	**217**	**223**	88
8.5
9	New York Rangers	AT	82	38	33	11	222	218	87
10	Atlanta Thrashers	SE	82	35	34	13	234	256	83
11	Carolina Hurricanes	SE	82	35	37	10	230	256	80
12	Tampa Bay Lightning	SE	82	34	36	12	217	260	80
13	New York Islanders	AT	82	34	37	11	222	264	79
14	Florida Panthers	SE	82	32	37	13	208	244	77
15	Toronto Maple Leafs	NE	82	30	38	14	214	267	74

bold – Qualified for playoffs; y – Won division; p – Won Presidents' Trophy (and division)

AT – Atlantic Division, NE – Northeast Division, SE – Southeast Division

== Schedule and results ==
2009–10 Game Log

October: 4-4-5 (Home: 3–2–2; Road: 1-2–3)
#	Date	Visitor	Score	Home	OT	Decision	Attendance	Record	Pts
1	October 3	Pittsburgh Penguins	4-3	New York Islanders	SO	Dwayne Roloson	16,234	0–0–1	1
2	October 8	New York Islanders	2-3	Ottawa Senators	OT	Martin Biron	18,075	0–0–2	2
3	October 10	New York Islanders	3-4	Boston Bruins	SO	Dwayne Roloson	17,113	0–0–3	3
4	October 12	Los Angeles Kings	2-1	New York Islanders		Martin Biron	12,145	0–1–3	3
5	October 16	New York Islanders	3-6	Buffalo Sabres		Dwayne Roloson	18,690	0–2–3	3
6	October 17	San Jose Sharks	4-1	New York Islanders		Martin Biron	11,287	0–3–3	3
7	October 21	Carolina Hurricanes	3-4	New York Islanders	SO	Dwayne Roloson	9,122	1–3–3	5
8	October 22	New York Islanders	1-5	Montreal Canadiens		Martin Biron	21,273	1–4–3	5
9	October 24	Washington Capitals	3-2	New York Islanders	OT	Dwayne Roloson	11,541	1–4–4	6
10	October 26	New York Islanders	2-3	Montreal Canadiens	OT	Martin Biron	21,273	1–4–5	7
11	October 28	New York Rangers	1-3	New York Islanders		Dwayne Roloson	15,213	2–4–5	9
12	October 30	New York Islanders	4-3	Washington Capitals	OT	Dwayne Roloson	18,277	3–4–5	11
13	October 31	Buffalo Sabres	0-5	New York Islanders		Martin Biron	8,889	4–4–5	13

November: 6-6-2 (Home: 3–1–0; Road: 3-5–2)
#	Date	Visitor	Score	Home	OT	Decision	Attendance	Record	Pts
14	November 2	Edmonton Oilers	1-3	New York Islanders		Dwayne Roloson	10,846	5–4–5	15
15	November 4	New York Islanders	0-3	Buffalo Sabres		Martin Biron	17,626	5–5–5	15
16	November 6	New York Islanders	1-2	New Jersey Devils		Martin Biron	14,109	5–6–5	15
17	November 7	Atlanta Thrashers	3-6	New York Islanders		Dwayne Roloson	14,119	6–6–5	17
18	November 11	New York Islanders	4-5	Washington Capitals	SO	Dwayne Roloson	18,277	6–6–6	18
19	November 13	New York Islanders	4-3	Carolina Hurricanes	OT	Martin Biron	14,163	7–6–6	20
20	November 14	New York Islanders	4-5	Florida Panthers	SO	Dwayne Roloson	15,921	7–6–7	21
21	November 16	New York Islanders	4-1	Boston Bruins		Dwayne Roloson	16,865	8–6–7	23
22	November 20	New York Islanders	2-3	Minnesota Wild		Martin Biron	18,114	8–7–7	23
23	November 21	New York Islanders	1-4	St. Louis Blues		Dwayne Roloson	19,150	8–8–7	23
24	November 23	New York Islanders	4-3	Toronto Maple Leafs	OT	Dwayne Roloson	19,263	9–8–7	25
25	November 25	Philadelphia Flyers	2-1	New York Islanders		Martin Biron	12,687	9–9–7	25
26	November 27	Pittsburgh Penguins	2-3	New York Islanders		Dwayne Roloson	15,262	10–9–7	27
27	November 28	New York Islanders	1-6	New Jersey Devils		Martin Biron	16,961	10–10–7	27

December: 6-8-1 (Home: 3–5–0; Road: 3–3–1)
#	Date	Visitor	Score	Home	OT	Decision	Attendance	Record	Pts
28	December 3	New York Islanders	4-1	Atlanta Thrashers		Dwayne Roloson	11,704	11–10–7	29
29	December 5	New York Islanders	0-4	Tampa Bay Lightning		Dwayne Roloson	13,577	11–11–7	29
30	December 8	New York Islanders	2-6	Philadelphia Flyers		Martin Biron	19,330	11–12–7	29
31	December 9	New York Islanders	2-3	Toronto Maple Leafs		Dwayne Roloson	19,102	11–13–7	29
32	December 12	Boston Bruins	2-3	New York Islanders	OT	Martin Biron	13,744	12–13–7	31
33	December 14	Florida Panthers	7-1	New York Islanders		Dwayne Roloson	10,489	12–14–7	31
34	December 16	New York Islanders	2-1	New York Rangers		Dwayne Roloson	18,200	13–14–7	33
35	December 17	New York Rangers	5-2	New York Islanders		Dwayne Roloson	15,137	13–15–7	33
36	December 19	Montreal Canadiens	3-0	New York Islanders		Martin Biron	7,842	13–16–7	33
37	December 21	Tampa Bay Lightning	4-2	New York Islanders		Dwayne Roloson	10,864	13–17–7	33
38	December 23	Toronto Maple Leafs	1-3	New York Islanders		Dwayne Roloson	10,865	14–17–7	35
39	December 26	New York Islanders	3-2	New York Rangers	OT	Dwayne Roloson	18,200	15–17–7	37
40	December 27	Philadelphia Flyers	2-1	New York Islanders		Martin Biron	12,819	15–18–7	37
41	December 29	Columbus Blue Jackets	1-2	New York Islanders	SO	Dwayne Roloson	12,192	16–18–7	39
42	December 31	New York Islanders	2-3	Ottawa Senators	SO	Dwayne Roloson	16,743	16–18–8	40

January: 7-7-0 (Home: 5–2–0; Road: 2–5–0)
#	Date	Visitor	Score	Home	OT	Decision	Attendance	Record	Pts
43	January 2	Atlanta Thrashers	5-6	New York Islanders	SO	Dwayne Roloson	12,824	17–18–8	42
44	January 6	New York Islanders	3-2	Colorado Avalanche		Dwayne Roloson	13,898	18–18–8	44
45	January 8	New York Islanders	3-4	Dallas Stars		Rick DiPietro	17,430	18–19–8	44
46	January 9	New York Islanders	5-4	Phoenix Coyotes	SO	Dwayne Roloson	11,454	19–19–8	46
47	January 12	Detroit Red Wings	0-6	New York Islanders		Dwayne Roloson	12,254	20–19–8	48
48	January 16	Buffalo Sabres	2-3	New York Islanders	SO	Rick DiPietro	13,635	21–19–8	50
49	January 18	New Jersey Devils	0-4	New York Islanders		Rick DiPietro	16,250	22–19–8	52
50	January 19	New York Islanders	4-6	Pittsburgh Penguins		Dwayne Roloson	16,981	22–20–8	52
51	January 21	Florida Panthers	1-2	New York Islanders	SO	Dwayne Roloson	12,138	23–20–8	54
52	January 23	New Jersey Devils	4-2	New York Islanders		Rick DiPietro	16,250	23–21–8	54
53	January 26	Washington Capitals	7-2	New York Islanders		Dwayne Roloson	12,549	23–22–8	54
54	January 28	New York Islanders	1-4	Carolina Hurricanes		Rick DiPietro	15,473	23–23–8	54
55	January 30	New York Islanders	1-2	Philadelphia Flyers		Dwayne Roloson	19,787	23–24–8	54
56	January 31	New York Islanders	0-2	Florida Panthers		Rick DiPietro	16,023	23–25–8	54

February: 2-4-0 (Home: 2–2–0; Road: 0–2–0)
#	Date	Visitor	Score	Home	OT	Decision	Attendance	Record	Pts
57	February 4	New York Islanders	2-5	Tampa Bay Lightning		Dwayne Roloson	13,891	23–26–8	54
58	February 6	Carolina Hurricanes	3-1	New York Islanders		Rick DiPietro	12,709	23–27–8	54
59	February 9	Nashville Predators	3-4	New York Islanders	SO	Martin Biron	11,487	24–27–8	56
60	February 10	New York Islanders	1-3	Pittsburgh Penguins		Dwayne Roloson	16,980	24–28–8	56
61	February 13	Tampa Bay Lightning	4-5	New York Islanders		Martin Biron	12,237	25–28–8	58
62	February 14	Ottawa Senators	4-3	New York Islanders		Dwayne Roloson	11,297	25–29–8	58

March: 6-6-2 (Home: 4–2–1; Road: 2–4–1)
#	Date	Visitor	Score	Home	OT	Decision	Attendance	Record	Pts
63	March 2	Chicago Blackhawks	3-5	New York Islanders		Dwayne Roloson	13,486	26–29–8	60
64	March 4	New York Islanders	3-6	Atlanta Thrashers		Martin Biron	14,776	26–30–8	60
65	March 6	Boston Bruins	3-2	New York Islanders		Dwayne Roloson	14,587	26–31–8	60
66	March 9	New York Islanders	2-3	Philadelphia Flyers		Dwayne Roloson	19,687	26–32–8	60
67	March 11	St. Louis Blues	2-1	New York Islanders	SO	Martin Biron	11.335	26–32–9	61
68	March 13	New Jersey Devils	2-4	New York Islanders		Dwayne Roloson	15,583	27–32–9	63
69	March 14	Toronto Maple Leafs	1-4	New York Islanders		Martin Biron	12,804	28–32–9	65
70	March 16	New York Islanders	5-2	Vancouver Canucks		Dwayne Roloson	18,810	29–32–9	67
71	March 19	New York Islanders	4-5	Anaheim Ducks	OT	Martin Biron	14,665	29–32–10	68
72	March 20	New York Islanders	0-1	Los Angeles Kings		Dwayne Roloson	18,118	29–33–10	68
73	March 24	New York Islanders	0-5	New York Rangers		Dwayne Roloson	18,200	29–34–10	68
74	March 25	Calgary Flames	2-3	New York Islanders		Martin Biron	12,817	30–34–10	70
75	March 27	New York Islanders	4-3	Columbus Blue Jackets	OT	Dwayne Roloson	16,972	31–34–10	72
76	March 30	New York Rangers	4-3	New York Islanders		Dwayne Roloson	16,250	31–35–10	72

April: 3-2-1 (Home: 3–0–1; Road: 0–2–0)
#	Date	Visitor	Score	Home	OT	Decision	Attendance	Record	Pts
77	April 1	Philadelphia Flyers	4-6	New York Islanders		Martin Biron	11,823	32–35–10	74
78	April 3	Ottawa Senators	1-4	New York Islanders		Martin Biron	11,942	33–35–10	76
79	April 6	Montreal Canadiens	3-4	New York Islanders	SO	Martin Biron	10,263	34–35–10	78
80	April 8	New York Islanders	3-7	Pittsburgh Penguins		Martin Biron	17,132	34–36–10	78
81	April 10	New York Islanders	1-7	New Jersey Devils		Martin Biron	17,625	34–37–10	78
82	April 11	Pittsburgh Penguins	6-5	New York Islanders	OT	Dwayne Roloson	16,250	34–37–11	79

Legend: Win (2 points) Loss (0 points) Overtime/shootout loss (1 point)

== Player statistics ==
=== Skaters ===
Note: GP = Games played; G = Goals; A = Assists; Pts = Points; +/− = Plus/minus; PIM = Penalty minutes

Regular season

Number	Position	Player	GP	G	A	Pts	+/−	PIM
91	LW	John Tavares	82	24	30	54	-15	22
21	RW	Kyle Okposo	80	19	33	52	-22	34
2	D	Mark Streit	82	11	38	49	0	48
26	LW	Matt Moulson	82	30	18	48	-1	16
51	C	Frans Nielsen	76	12	26	38	4	6
57	RW	Blake Comeau	61	17	18	35	-2	40
12	C	Josh Bailey	73	16	19	35	5	18
10	RW	Richard Park	81	9	22	31	-9	28
7	RW	Trent Hunter	61	11	17	28	3	18
13	C	Rob Schremp	44	7	18	25	-4	8
20	LW	Sean Bergenheim	63	10	13	23	1	45
16	LW	Jon Sim	77	13	9	22	-4	44
38	D	Jack Hillen	69	3	18	21	-5	44
93	C	Doug Weight	36	1	16	17	-1	8
8	D	Bruno Gervais	71	3	14	17	-15	31
44	D	Freddy Meyer	64	4	11	15	-2	40
15	LW	Jeff Tambellini	36	7	7	14	-8	14
25	D	Andy Sutton^{‡}	54	4	8	12	-3	73
28	RW	Tim Jackman	54	4	5	9	-4	98
47	D	Andrew MacDonald	46	1	6	7	4	20
45	C	Nate Thompson^{‡}	39	1	5	6	-14	39
32	D	Brendan Witt	42	2	3	5	-18	45
42	D	Dylan Reese	19	2	2	4	4	14
56	D	Dustin Kohn	22	0	4	4	-2	4
24	D	Radek Martinek	16	2	1	3	-1	12
46	LW	Matthew Martin	5	0	2	2	-1	26
4	D	Mark Flood	6	0	1	1	-4	0
58	LW	Jesse Joensuu	11	1	0	1	4	4
14	LW	Trevor Gillies	14	0	1	1	-2	75
62	C	Greg Mauldin	1	0	0	0	-1	0
59	C	Micheal Haley	2	0	0	0	-3	9
40	RW	Joel Rechlicz	6	0	0	0	-2	27
48	D	Anton Klementyev	1	0	0	0	0	0

=== Goaltenders ===
Note: GP = Games played; TOI = Time on ice (minutes); W = Wins; L = Losses; OT = Overtime losses; GA = Goals against; GAA= Goals against average; SA= Shots against; SV= Saves; Sv% = Save percentage; SO= Shutouts

Regular season

#	Player	GP	TOI	W	L	OT	GA	GAA	SA	Sv%	SO	G	A	PIM
30	Dwayne Roloson	50	2897	23	18	7	145	3.00	1555	.907	1	0	0	14
43	Martin Biron	29	1634	9	14	4	89	3.27	859	.896	1	0	1	2
39	Rick DiPietro	8	462	2	5	0	20	2.60	201	.900	1	0	1	2

^{†}Denotes player spent time with another team before joining Islanders. Stats reflect time with Islanders only.
^{‡}Traded mid-season. Stats reflect time with Islanders only.

== Awards and records ==
=== Awards ===
Regular Season
Player	Award	Reached
John Tavares	NHL Second Star of the Week	March 22, 2010

== Transactions ==
Before the 2009–10 season got underway, the Islanders were involved in many transactions, and signed and lost some free agents. Their first trade for the season was made at the 2009 NHL entry draft, where the New York Islanders sent four draft picks to the Columbus Blue Jackets in exchange for two draft picks (including a first round pick that allowed them move up ten spots from a previously acquired pick). The team would make another trade with the Blue Jackets later on in the draft. The Islanders also made a trade with the Minnesota Wild, which allowed them to move up four additional spots (to pick 12th) from the position they were in after their original trade with Columbus. They wound up using the pick to draft Calvin de Haan. In the third round, the Islanders traded a third round pick in the 2010 draft for the 62nd pick in the current draft. On June 30, 2009, the Islanders traded Ben Walter and a conditional pick in the 2010 draft to the New Jersey Devils for Tony Romano.

The Islanders signed many free agents as well, including veteran goalie Dwayne Roloson on July 1. The following day, the Islanders signed three other players: Scott Munroe, Brett Westgarth and Jeremy Reich. On July 6, the Islanders acquired four minor-league players, and lost two of their own (Chris Lee and Peter Mannino). Yann Danis and Joe Callahan both left the Islanders as well on July 10 and 16, respectively. The Islander last acquired was goaltender Martin Biron, who played the previous season for the Philadelphia Flyers.

The Islanders also signed their first overall draft pick from 2009, John Tavares, to a three-year, entry-level contract on July 15, and resigned Nate Thompson to a one-year, two-way contract on July 25.

=== Trades ===
Date	Details
June 26, 2009	To Columbus Blue Jackets 1st-round pick (26th overall) in 2009; 2nd-round pick (37th overall) in 2009; 3rd-round pick (62nd overall) in 2009; 4th-round pick (92nd overall) in 2009	To New York Islanders 1st-round pick (16th overall) in 2009; 3rd-round pick (77th overall) in 2009
June 26, 2009	To Minnesota Wild 1st-round pick (16th overall) in 2009; 3rd-round pick (77th overall) in 2009; 7th-round pick (182nd overall) in 2009	To New York Islanders 1st-round pick (12th overall) in 2009
June 27, 2009	To Columbus Blue Jackets 2nd-round pick (56th overall) in 2009	To New York Islanders 3rd-round pick (62nd overall) in 2009; 4th-round pick (92nd overall) in 2009
June 27, 2009	To Phoenix Coyotes 3rd-round pick (91st overall) in 2009	To New York Islanders 3rd-round pick in 2010
June 30, 2009	To New Jersey Devils Ben Walter; Conditional pick in 2012 (Note: Condition not satisfied.)	To New York Islanders Tony Romano
March 1, 2010	To Columbus Blue Jackets Greg Moore	To New York Islanders Dylan Reese
March 2, 2010	To Ottawa Senators Andy Sutton	To New York Islanders 2nd-round pick in 2010

=== Free agents acquired ===
Player	Former team	Date acquired
Dwayne Roloson	Edmonton Oilers	July 1, 2009
Scott Munroe	Philadelphia Flyers	July 2, 2009
Brett Westgarth	San Jose Sharks	July 2, 2009
Jeremy Reich	Boston Bruins	July 2, 2009
Mark Flood	Carolina Hurricanes	July 6, 2009
Greg Mauldin	Ottawa Senators	July 6, 2009
Matt Moulson	Los Angeles Kings	July 6, 2009
Greg Moore	New York Rangers	July 6, 2009
Martin Biron	Philadelphia Flyers	July 22, 2009

=== Free agents lost ===
Player	New team	Date lost
Chris Lee	Pittsburgh Penguins	July 6, 2009
Peter Mannino	Atlanta Thrashers	July 6, 2009
Yann Danis	New Jersey Devils	July 10, 2009
Joe Callahan	San Jose Sharks	July 16, 2009

=== Lost via waivers ===
Player	New team	Date claimed off waivers
Nate Thompson	Tampa Bay Lightning	January 21, 2010

=== Players re-signed ===
Player	Contract terms	Date signed
Nate Thompson	One–year, two–way	July 25, 2009

== Draft picks ==
It's a big moment for the franchise. We just have to go through the process of scouting meetings. When we go through the process of meeting them -- not only in the combine, but bringing them to Long Island -- and getting to know them, it's going to be a fun part of the process. We need great players and we need a new building -- there's no doubt about that. There's a lot of good things happening right now with this organization. It's an exciting time to be an Islanders fan and a New York Islander."

— Garth Snow via NHL.com

The Islanders held the first pick in the 2009 NHL entry draft, to be held in Montreal. On April 14, 2009, it was announced that the Islanders had won the 2009 NHL Draft Lottery and earned the first draft pick for the fourth time in the franchise's history. Going into the lottery, the Islanders held a 48.2% chance of winning the lottery, due to their coming in last place in the 2008–09 season. In addition to the first pick, the Islanders hold the 26th draft pick during the first round, acquiring it from the San Jose Sharks, and three second-round draft picks. Matt Duchene, Victor Hedman, Evander Kane, Brayden Schenn and John Tavares were the favorites to be drafted by the first five teams. General manager Garth Snow mentioned in an article on the Islanders' official website that Islanders management have scouted each of these players for years. Since the announcement about the Islanders picking first in the draft, their ticket sales department has seen a 300% increase in phone calls and email inquiries over last year at the same date.

During the draft, the Islanders selected center John Tavares as their first pick and also the first pick overall in the draft. After selecting Tavares, the Islanders made a trade with the Columbus Blue Jackets that sent the Islanders picks 26, 37, 62 and 92 (in 2009) to the Blue Jackets in exchange for picks 16 and 77 (in 2009). With this trade, the Islanders had moved up from pick 26 to pick 16 in the first round of the 2009 Draft. Following this, the Islanders made another trade, this time with the Minnesota Wild, giving Minnesota picks 16, 77 and 182 (in 2009) in exchange for pick 12 from Minnesota (in 2009). At this point, the Islanders had moved up from pick 26 to pick 12. With the 12th pick, the Islanders selected Calvin de Haan, a defenceman from the Oshawa Generals.

Round	Pick #	Player	Nationality	Position	Prior team	Prior league
1	1	John Tavares	Canada	C	London Knights	OHL
1	12	Calvin de Haan	Canada	D	Oshawa Generals	OHL
2	31	Mikko Koskinen	Finland	G	Espoo Blues	SM-liiga
3	62	Anders Nilsson	Sweden	G	Luleå HF	J20 SuperElit
4	92	Casey Cizikas	Canada	C	Mississauga St. Michael's Majors	OHL
5	122	Anton Klementyev	Russia	D	Lokomotiv Yaroslavl-2	Russian Hockey First League
6	152	Anders Lee	United States	C	Edina High School	USHS-MN

== Farm teams ==
=== Bridgeport Sound Tigers ===
The Islanders' American Hockey League affiliate will remain to be the Bridgeport Sound Tigers in the 2009–10 season.

=== Utah Grizzlies ===
The Utah Grizzlies remain New York's ECHL affiliate for the 2009–10 season.

=== Odessa Jackalopes ===
The Odessa Jackalopes remain New York's Central Hockey League affiliate for the 2009–10 season.
