= 2009–10 Florida Panthers season =

National Hockey League team season

2009–10 Florida Panthers
- Division: 5th Southeast
- Conference: 14th Eastern
- 2009–10 record: 32–37–13
- Home record: 16–16–9
- Road record: 16–21–4
- Goals for: 208
- Goals against: 244

Team information
- General manager: Randy Sexton
- Coach: Peter DeBoer
- Captain: Bryan McCabe
- Alternate captains: Cory Stillman; Stephen Weiss
- Arena: BankAtlantic Center
- Average attendance: 14,896 (77.4%) (after 20 games)

Team leaders
- Goals: Stephen Weiss (28)
- Assists: Nathan Horton (37)
- Points: Stephen Weiss (60)
- Penalty minutes: Bryan Allen (99)
- Plus/minus: Jason Garrison (+5)
- Wins: Tomas Vokoun (23)
- Goals against average: Tomas Vokoun (2.55)

The 2009–10 Florida Panthers season was the 16th season for the franchise in the National Hockey League (NHL). After earning 77 points in the season, the Panthers did not qualify for the playoffs for the ninth year in a row for the first time in franchise history.

== Off-season ==
The Panthers moved their training facilities and administrative center to the 'Incredible Ice' complex in Coral Springs, Florida. A new $10 million, 50,000 square feet (4,600 m^{2}) expansion was built to accommodate the Panthers.

On June 1, 2009, General Manager Jacques Martin resigned his position to become the head coach of the Montreal Canadiens. Assistant General Manager Randy Sexton assumed the duties of general manager on an interim basis, and was named general manager just prior to the start of the season. This is Sexton's second time as an NHL general manager. He was the Ottawa Senators general manager in the early 1990s. After the season, the Panthers replaced Sexton with new general manager, Dale Tallon.

== Pre-season ==
2009 Pre-season Game Log: 5–3–1 (Home: 2–0–0; Road: 3–3–1)
#	Date	Visitor	Score	Home	OT	Decision	Attendance	Record
1	September 15 (in Halifax, NS)	Ottawa Senators	1 - 3	Florida Panthers		Clemmensen	6,178	1–0–0
2	September 16	Florida Panthers	2 - 1	Ottawa Senators		Vokoun	15,205	2–0–0
3	September 17	Florida Panthers	2 - 3	Montreal Canadiens		Clemmensen	21,273	2–1–0
4	September 18	Florida Panthers	0 - 4	Edmonton Oilers		Vokoun	16,601	2–2–0
5	September 20	Florida Panthers	2 - 5	Calgary Flames		Vokoun	19,289	2–3–0
6	September 22	Florida Panthers	3 - 1	Dallas Stars		Clemmensen	14,815	3–3–0
7	September 23	Dallas Stars	1 - 4	Florida Panthers		Vokoun	8,923	4–3–0
8	September 28 (in Tampere, Finland)	Florida Panthers	2 - 3	Tappara (Finland)	OT	Clemmensen	-	4–3–1
9	September 30 (in Helsinki, Finland)	Florida Panthers	4 - 2	Jokerit (Finland)		Vokoun	-	5–3–1

== Regular season ==
The Panthers failed to make the playoffs for the ninth consecutive season. They have not qualified for the playoffs since the 1999–2000 season.

=== Divisional standings ===
Southeast Division
		GP	W	L	OTL	GF	GA	Pts
**1**	**p – Washington Capitals**	**82**	**54**	**15**	**13**	**318**	**233**	**121**
2	Atlanta Thrashers	82	35	34	13	234	256	83
3	Carolina Hurricanes	82	35	37	10	230	256	80
4	Tampa Bay Lightning	82	34	36	12	217	260	80
5	Florida Panthers	82	32	37	13	208	244	77

=== Conference standings ===
Eastern Conference
R		Div	GP	W	L	OTL	GF	GA	Pts
**1**	**p – Washington Capitals**	**SE**	**82**	**54**	**15**	**13**	**318**	**233**	121
**2**	**y – New Jersey Devils**	**AT**	**82**	**48**	**27**	**7**	**222**	**191**	103
**3**	**y – Buffalo Sabres**	**NE**	**82**	**45**	**27**	**10**	**235**	**207**	100
**4**	**Pittsburgh Penguins**	**AT**	**82**	**47**	**28**	**7**	**257**	**237**	101
**5**	**Ottawa Senators**	**NE**	**82**	**44**	**32**	**6**	**225**	**238**	94
**6**	**Boston Bruins**	**NE**	**82**	**39**	**30**	**13**	**206**	**200**	91
**7**	**Philadelphia Flyers**	**AT**	**82**	**41**	**35**	**6**	**236**	**225**	88
**8**	**Montreal Canadiens**	**NE**	**82**	**39**	**33**	**10**	**217**	**223**	88
8.5
9	New York Rangers	AT	82	38	33	11	222	218	87
10	Atlanta Thrashers	SE	82	35	34	13	234	256	83
11	Carolina Hurricanes	SE	82	35	37	10	230	256	80
12	Tampa Bay Lightning	SE	82	34	36	12	217	260	80
13	New York Islanders	AT	82	34	37	11	222	264	79
14	Florida Panthers	SE	82	32	37	13	208	244	77
15	Toronto Maple Leafs	NE	82	30	38	14	214	267	74

bold – Qualified for playoffs; y – Won division; p – Won Presidents' Trophy (and division)

AT – Atlantic Division, NE – Northeast Division, SE – Southeast Division

=== Game log ===
2009–10 Game Log

October: 4–7–1 (Home: 1–4–0; Road: 3–3–1)
#	**Date**	**Visitor**	**Score**	**Home**	**OT**	**Decision**	**Attendance**	**Record**	**Pts**
1	October 2 (in Helsinki, FI)	Florida Panthers	4 - 3	Chicago Blackhawks	SO	Vokoun	12,056	1-0-0	2
2	October 3 (in Helsinki, FI)	Chicago Blackhawks	4 - 0	Florida Panthers		Vokoun	11,526	1-1-0	2
3	October 9	Florida Panthers	2 - 7	Carolina Hurricanes		Vokoun	13,597	1-2-0	2
4	October 10	New Jersey Devils	3 - 2	Florida Panthers		Vokoun	18,802	1-3-0	2
5	October 12	Florida Panthers	2 - 3	Tampa Bay Lightning		Vokoun	14,126	1-4-0	2
6	October 16	Philadelphia Flyers	2 - 4	Florida Panthers		Clemmensen	15,557	2-4-0	4
7	October 21	Buffalo Sabres	5 - 2	Florida Panthers		Clemmensen	12,607	2-5-0	4
8	October 23	Florida Panthers	2 - 3	Pittsburgh Penguins	SO	Vokoun	16,971	2-5-1	5
9	October 24	Florida Panthers	1 - 5	Philadelphia Flyers		Vokoun	19,007	2-6-1	5
10	October 28	Ottawa Senators	4 - 3	Florida Panthers		Vokoun	12,596	2-7-1	5
11	October 30	Florida Panthers	6 - 5	Dallas Stars	SO	Clemmensen	16,824	3-7-1	7
12	October 31	Florida Panthers	4 - 0	St. Louis Blues		Vokoun	17,943	4-7-1	9

November: 6–5–3 (Home: 2–2–3; Road: 4–3–0)
#	**Date**	**Visitor**	**Score**	**Home**	**OT**	**Decision**	**Attendance**	**Record**	**Pts**
13	November 4	Carolina Hurricanes	0 - 3	Florida Panthers		Vokoun	12,424	5-7-1	11
14	November 6	Washington Capitals	1 - 4	Florida Panthers		Vokoun	15,877	5-8-1	11
15	November 7	Florida Panthers	4 - 7	Washington Capitals		Clemmensen	18,277	5-9-1	11
16	November 12	Florida Panthers	1 - 0	Boston Bruins	SO	Vokoun	17,074	6-9-1	13
17	November 14	New York Islanders	4 - 5	Florida Panthers	SO	Vokoun	15,921	7-9-1	15
18	November 16	Los Angeles Kings	4 - 3	Florida Panthers	SO	Vokoun	12,502	7-9-2	16
19	November 18	Florida Panthers	6 - 2	Buffalo Sabres		Vokoun	18,546	8-9-2	18
20	November 20	Florida Panthers	2 - 1	Detroit Red Wings	OT	Vokoun	16,424	9-9-2	20
21	November 21	Florida Panthers	3 - 2	New York Rangers		Vokoun	18,200	10-9-2	22
22	November 23	Pittsburgh Penguins	3 - 2	Florida Panthers	OT	Vokoun	17,024	10-9-3	23
23	November 25	New York Rangers	2 - 1	Florida Panthers	SO	Vokoun	16,281	10-9-4	24
24	November 27	Toronto Maple Leafs	6 - 4	Florida Panthers		Vokoun	16,101	10-10-4	24
25	November 28	Florida Panthers	1 - 4	Nashville Predators		Clemmensen	14,120	10-11-4	24
26	November 30	Florida Panthers	3 - 4	Atlanta Thrashers		Clemmensen	10,310	10-12-4	24

December: 6–6–3 (Home: 3–2–2; Road: 3–4–1)
#	**Date**	**Visitor**	**Score**	**Home**	**OT**	**Decision**	**Attendance**	**Record**	**Pts**
27	December 2	Colorado Avalanche	5 - 6	Florida Panthers	SO	Clemmensen	12,403	11-12-4	26
28	December 3	Florida Panthers	2 - 6	Washington Capitals		Salak	18,277	11-13-4	26
29	December 5	Atlanta Thrashers	2 - 1	Florida Panthers	SO	Vokoun	13,291	11-13-5	27
30	December 7	Edmonton Oilers	3 - 2	Florida Panthers	SO	Vokoun	11,469	11-13-6	28
31	December 9	Florida Panthers	0 - 3	Columbus Blue Jackets		Vokoun	12,800	11-14-6	28
32	December 11	Florida Panthers	4 - 2	New Jersey Devils		Clemmensen	14,132	12-14-6	30
33	December 12	Florida Panthers	2 - 3	Pittsburgh Penguins	OT	Vokoun	16,977	12-14-7	31
34	December 14	Florida Panthers	7 - 1	New York Islanders		Vokoun	10,489	13-14-7	33
35	December 16	Atlanta Thrashers	4 - 3	Florida Panthers		Vokoun	11,672	14-14-7	35
36	December 18	Carolina Hurricanes	6 - 3	Florida Panthers		Vokoun	15,107	15-14-7	37
37	December 19	Florida Panthers	2 - 3	Carolina Hurricanes		Clemmensen	12,758	15-15-7	37
38	December 21	Florida Panthers	4 - 1	Philadelphia Flyers		Vokoun	19,323	16-15-7	39
39	December 23	Florida Panthers	1 - 4	New York Rangers		Vokoun	18,200	16-16-7	39
40	December 27	Boston Bruins	1 - 2	Florida Panthers		Clemmensen	18,799	16-17-7	39
41	December 31	Montreal Canadiens	4 - 5	Florida Panthers		Vokoun	19,851	16-18-7	39

January: 8–4–2 (Home: 6–0–1; Road: 2–4–1)
#	**Date**	**Visitor**	**Score**	**Home**	**OT**	**Decision**	**Attendance**	**Record**	**Pts**
42	January 3	Pittsburgh Penguins	2 - 6	Florida Panthers		Vokoun	18,110	17-18-7	41
43	January 5	Florida Panthers	2 - 3	Toronto Maple Leafs		Vokoun	18,984	17-19-7	41
44	January 7	Florida Panthers	0 - 2	Montreal Canadiens		Vokoun	21,273	17-20-7	41
45	January 9	Florida Panthers	3 - 0	Ottawa Senators		Vokoun	16,506	18-20-7	43
46	January 13	Washington Capitals	5 - 4	Florida Panthers	SO	Vokoun	14,776	18-20-8	44
47	January 14	Florida Panthers	3 - 2	Tampa Bay Lightning		Vokoun	13,516	19-20-8	46
48	January 16	Tampa Bay Lightning	2 - 5	Florida Panthers		Vokoun	15,971	20-20-8	48
49	January 18	Atlanta Thrashers	0 - 1	Florida Panthers		Vokoun	11,818	21-20-8	50
50	January 20	Florida Panthers	0 - 2	New Jersey Devils		Vokoun	13,931	21-21-8	50
51	January 21	Florida Panthers	1 - 2	New York Islanders	SO	Vokoun	12,138	21-21-9	51
52	January 23	Toronto Maple Leafs	0 - 2	Florida Panthers		Vokoun	18,087	22-21-9	53
53	January 26	Montreal Canadiens	1 - 2	Florida Panthers		Vokoun	17,104	23-21-9	55
54	January 29	Florida Panthers	1 - 4	Washington Capitals		Vokoun	18,277	23-22-9	55
55	January 31	New York Islanders	0 - 2	Florida Panthers		Vokoun	16,023	24-22-9	57

February: 0–5–1 (Home: 0–3–1; Road: 0–2–0)
#	**Date**	**Visitor**	**Score**	**Home**	**OT**	**Decision**	**Attendance**	**Record**	**Pts**
56	February 1	Anaheim Ducks	3 - 0	Florida Panthers		Vokoun	10,843	24-23-9	57
57	February 5	Calgary Flames	2 - 1	Florida Panthers		Vokoun	16,781	24-24-9	57
58	February 6	Florida Panthers	2 - 4	Atlanta Thrashers		Vokoun	16,743	24-25-9	57
59	February 9	Florida Panthers	1 - 4	Carolina Hurricanes		Vokoun	18,393	24-26-9	57
60	February 11	Vancouver Canucks	3 - 0	Florida Panthers		Vokoun	13,787	24-27-9	57
61	February 13	Boston Bruins	2 - 3	Florida Panthers	SO	Vokoun	17,109	24-27-10	58

March: 6–7–2 (Home: 3–2–2; Road: 3–5–0)
#	**Date**	**Visitor**	**Score**	**Home**	**OT**	**Decision**	**Attendance**	**Record**	**Pts**
62	March 2	Florida Panthers	2 - 4	Atlanta Thrashers		Clemmensen	13,818	24-28-10	58
63	March 3	Philadelphia Flyers	4 - 7	Florida Panthers		Vokoun	15,878	25-28-10	60
64	March 6	Carolina Hurricanes	1 - 4	Florida Panthers		Vokoun	16,202	26-28-10	62
65	March 9	Florida Panthers	3 - 2	Minnesota Wild	SO	Vokoun	18,191	27-28-10	64
66	March 11	Florida Panthers	0 - 3	Colorado Avalanche		Vokoun	11,458	27-29-10	64
67	March 13	Florida Panthers	3 - 2	San Jose Sharks	OT	Vokoun	17,562	28-29-10	66
68	March 16	Washington Capitals	7 - 3	Florida Panthers		Vokoun	15,123	28-30-10	66
69	March 18	Phoenix Coyotes	4 - 3	Florida Panthers	SO	Vokoun	12,282	28-30-11	67
70	March 20	Buffalo Sabres	3 - 1	Florida Panthers		Vokoun	18,217	28-31-11	67
71	March 21	Tampa Bay Lightning	2 - 5	Florida Panthers		Clemmensen	14,831	29-31-11	69
72	March 23	Florida Panthers	4 - 1	Toronto Maple Leafs		Clemmensen	19,158	30-31-11	71
73	March 25	Florida Panthers	1 - 4	Montreal Canadiens		Vokoun	21,273	30-32-11	71
74	March 27	Florida Panthers	2 - 3	Ottawa Senators		Vokoun	18,689	30-33-11	71
75	March 29	Nashville Predators	3 - 2	Florida Panthers	OT	Clemmensen	13,679	30-33-12	72
76	March 31	Florida Panthers	6 - 2	Buffalo Sabres		Vokoun	18,690	30-34-12	72

April: 2–3–1 (Home: 1–3–0; Road: 1–0–1)
#	**Date**	**Visitor**	**Score**	**Home**	**OT**	**Decision**	**Attendance**	**Record**	**Pts**
77	April 1	Florida Panthers	1 - 0	Boston Bruins		Clemmensen	17,565	31-34-12	74
78	April 3	New York Rangers	4 - 1	Florida Panthers		Clemmensen	18,011	31-35-12	74
79	April 6	Ottawa Senators	5 - 2	Florida Panthers		Vokoun	11,790	31-36-12	74
80	April 8	New Jersey Devils	2 - 3	Florida Panthers		Clemmensen	15,273	32-36-12	76
81	April 10	Florida Panthers	3 - 4	Tampa Bay Lightning	SO	Clemmensen	17,050	32-36-13	77
82	April 11	Tampa Bay Lightning	3 - 1	Florida Panthers		Clemmensen	15,884	32-37-13	77

**Legend**: Win (2 points) Loss (0 points) Overtime/shootout loss (1 point)

== Player statistics ==
=== Skaters ===
Note: GP = Games played; G = Goals; A = Assists; Pts = Points; +/− = Plus/minus; PIM = Penalty minutes

Regular season

Player	GP	G	A	Pts	+/−	PIM
Stephen Weiss	80	28	32	60	-7	40
Nathan Horton	65	20	37	57	-1	42
Bryan McCabe	82	8	35	43	-4	83
Michael Frolik	82	21	22	43	-4	43
Steven Reinprecht	82	16	22	38	-1	18
Cory Stillman	58	15	22	37	-3	22
Radek Dvorak	76	14	18	32	-7	20
Rostislav Olesz	78	14	15	29	-4	28
Keith Ballard	82	8	20	28	-7	88
Dennis Seidenberg^{‡}	62	2	21	23	-3	33
Jordan Leopold^{‡}	61	7	11	18	-7	22
Gregory Campbell	60	2	15	17	-5	53
Dominic Moore^{‡}	48	8	9	17	-7	35
Shawn Matthias	55	7	9	16	-3	10
David Booth	28	8	8	16	-3	23
Dmitri Kulikov	68	3	13	16	-5	32
Kamil Kreps	76	5	9	14	-7	18
Bryan Allen	74	4	9	13	-8	99
Jason Garrison	39	2	6	8	5	23
Victor Oreskovich	50	2	4	6	-8	26
Michal Repik	19	3	2	5	1	6
Ville Koistinen	17	1	3	4	1	8
Kenndal McArdle	19	1	2	3	-4	29
Nick Tarnasky	31	1	2	3	-5	85
Jeff Taffe	21	1	1	2	-1	4
Byron Bitz^{†}	7	1	1	2	1	2
Steve MacIntyre^{†}	22	0	1	1	-3	24
Mike Duco	10	0	0	0	-3	50
Clay Wilson	2	0	0	0	-5	0
Evgeny Dadonov	4	0	0	0	-1	0
Keaton Ellerby	22	0	0	0	-1	2

=== Goaltenders ===
Note: GP = Games played; TOI = Time on ice (minutes); W = Wins; L = Losses; OT = Overtime losses; GA = Goals against; GAA= Goals against average; SA= Shots against; SV= Saves; Sv% = Save percentage; SO= Shutouts

Regular season

Player	GP	TOI	W	L	OT	GA	GAA	SA	Sv%	SO	G	A	PIM
Tomas Vokoun	63	3695	23	28	11	157	2.55	2081	.925	7	0	2	0
Scott Clemmensen	23	1215	9	8	2	59	2.91	668	.912	1	0	0	0
Alexander Salak	2	67	0	1	0	6	5.37	40	.850	0	0	0	0

^{†}Denotes player spent time with another team before joining Panthers. Stats reflect time with Panthers only.
^{‡}Traded mid-season
Bold/italics denotes franchise record

== Awards and records ==
=== Awards ===
Regular Season
Player	Award	Awarded
Stephen Weiss	NHL Second Star of the Week	December 7, 2009
Tomas Vokoun	NHL Third Star of the Month	January 2010
Bryan McCabe	NHL Third Star of the Week	March 8, 2010

=== Milestones ===
Regular Season
Player	Milestone	Reached
Dmitri Kulikov	1st Career NHL Game	October 2, 2009
Dmitri Kulikov	1st Career NHL Assist; 1st Career NHL Point	October 10, 2009

== Transactions ==
The Panthers were involved in the following transactions during the 2009–10 season.

=== Trades ===
Date	Details
June 19, 2009	To Phoenix Coyotes Stefan Meyer	To Florida Panthers Steve Reinprecht
June 27, 2009	To Calgary Flames Jay Bouwmeester	To Florida Panthers Jordan Leopold; 3rd-round pick (67th overall) in 2009
February 11, 2010	To Montreal Canadiens Dominic Moore	To Florida Panthers 2nd-round pick in 2011
March 1, 2010	To Pittsburgh Penguins Jordan Leopold	To Florida Panthers 2nd-round pick in 2010
March 3, 2010	To Boston Bruins Dennis Seidenberg; Matt Bartkowski	To Florida Panthers Byron Bitz; Craig Weller; 2nd-round pick in 2010
March 3, 2010	To Columbus Blue Jackets Matt Rust	To Florida Panthers Mathieu Roy

=== Free agents acquired ===
Player	Former team	Contract terms
Alexander Salak	TPS	undisclosed
Scott Clemmensen	New Jersey Devils	3 years, $3.6 million
Ville Koistinen	Nashville Predators	2 years, $2.4 million
Clay Wilson	Atlanta Thrashers	2 years
Jeff Taffe	Pittsburgh Penguins	2 years
Graham Mink	Washington Capitals	2 years
Jamie Johnson	TPS	1 year
Dennis Seidenberg	Carolina Hurricanes	1 year, $2.25 million
Dominic Moore	Buffalo Sabres	1 year

=== Free agents lost ===
Player	New team	Contract terms
Craig Anderson	Colorado Avalanche	2 years, $3.6 million
Karlis Skrastins	Dallas Stars	2 years, $2.75 million
Nick Boynton	Anaheim Ducks	1 year, $1.5 million
Anthony Stewart	Atlanta Thrashers	undisclosed
Tanner Glass	Vancouver Canucks	1 year, $500,000
Steve Eminger	Anaheim Ducks	2 years
Jassen Cullimore	Chicago Blackhawks	undisclosed

=== Claimed via waivers ===
Player	Former team	Date claimed off waivers
Steve MacIntyre	Edmonton Oilers	November 10, 2009

=== Lost via waivers ===
Player	New team	Date claimed off waivers

=== Player signings ===
Player	Contract terms
Steve Reinprecht	3 years, $6.15 million
Radek Dvorak	2 years, $3.4 million
David Booth	6 years, $25.5 million
Jordan Leopold	1 year, $1.75 million
Evgeny Dadonov	entry-level contract
Dmitri Kulikov	entry-level contract
Marc Cheverie	entry-level contract

== Draft picks ==
Florida's picks at the 2009 NHL entry draft in Montreal, Quebec.

Round	#	Player	Position	Nationality	College/Junior/Club team (League)
1	14	Dmitri Kulikov	(D)	Russia	Drummondville Voltigeurs (QMJHL)
2	44	Drew Shore	(C)	United States	U.S. National Team Development Program (USHL)
3	67 (from Phoenix via Calgary)	Josh Birkholz	(RW)	United States	Fargo Force (USHL)
4	107 (from Columbus via Calgary and Los Angeles)	Garrett Wilson	(F)	Canada	Owen Sound Attack (OHL)
5	135	Corban Knight	(C)	Canada	Okotoks Oilers (AJHL)
5	138 (from St. Louis via Los Angeles)	Wade Megan	(C)	United States	South Kent School (USHS-CT)
6	165	Scott Timmins	(C)	Canada	Windsor Spitfires (OHL)

== See also ==
- 2009–10 NHL season

== Farm teams ==
The Florida Panthers maintain affiliations with two minor league teams, the Rochester Americans and the Florida Everblades.
