= 2009–10 Buffalo Sabres season =

NHL hockey team season

2009–10 Buffalo Sabres
- Northeast Division champions
- Division: 1st Northeast
- Conference: 3rd Eastern
- 2009–10 record: 45–27–10
- Home record: 25–10–6
- Road record: 20–17–4
- Goals for: 235
- Goals against: 207

Team information
- General manager: Darcy Regier
- Coach: Lindy Ruff
- Captain: Craig Rivet
- Alternate captains: Paul Gaustad; Jochen Hecht; Jason Pominville; Derek Roy
- Arena: HSBC Arena
- Average attendance: Average: 18,529

Team leaders
- Goals: Thomas Vanek (28)
- Assists: Tim Connolly (48)
- Points: Derek Roy (69)
- Penalty minutes: Craig Rivet (100)
- Plus/minus: Jochen Hecht (+14)
- Wins: Ryan Miller (41)
- Goals against average: Ryan Miller (2.22)

The 2009–10 Buffalo Sabres season was the 40th season (39th season of play) of the Buffalo Sabres in the National Hockey League (NHL). The season saw the Sabres win the Northeast Division title and return to the playoffs for the first time in three seasons. Ryan Miller won the Vezina Trophy for the first time in his career. The Vezina win was the League-best eight for the Sabres franchise since 1982, when the trophy began being awarded to the NHL's top goaltender. Tyler Myers became the first Sabre to win the Calder Memorial Trophy, for Rookie of the Year, since Tom Barrasso won it in the 1983–84 season. This was the last division title for the Sabres until 2025–26.

== Pre-season ==
2009 Pre-season Game Log: 4–1–1 (Home: 1–0–1; Road: 3–1–0)

#	Date	Visitor	Score	Home	Decision	Attendance	Record	Recap
1	September 17	Washington Capitals	3-4	Buffalo Sabres	Enroth	17,597	0-0-1	Recap
2	September 19	Buffalo Sabres	3-1	Detroit Red Wings	Miller	15,924	1-0-1	Recap
3	September 21	Buffalo Sabres	2-1	Washington Capitals	Lalime	18,075	2-0-1	Recap
4	September 23	Toronto Maple Leafs	2-3	Buffalo Sabres	Miller	11,008	3-0-1	Recap
5	September 26	Buffalo Sabres	2-3	Montreal Canadiens	Miller	21,273	3-1-1	Recap
6	September 27	Buffalo Sabres	7-6	Toronto Maple Leafs	Lalime	18,388	4-1-1	Recap

== Regular season ==
=== Divisional standings ===
Northeast Division
		GP	W	L	OTL	GF	GA	Pts
**1**	**y – Buffalo Sabres**	**82**	**45**	**27**	**10**	**235**	**207**	**100**
**2**	**Ottawa Senators**	**82**	**44**	**32**	**6**	**225**	**238**	**94**
**3**	**Boston Bruins**	**82**	**39**	**30**	**13**	**206**	**200**	**91**
**4**	**Montreal Canadiens**	**82**	**39**	**33**	**10**	**217**	**223**	**88**
5	Toronto Maple Leafs	82	30	38	14	214	263	74

=== Conference standings ===
Eastern Conference
R		Div	GP	W	L	OTL	GF	GA	Pts
**1**	**p – Washington Capitals**	**SE**	**82**	**54**	**15**	**13**	**318**	**233**	121
**2**	**y – New Jersey Devils**	**AT**	**82**	**48**	**27**	**7**	**222**	**191**	103
**3**	**y – Buffalo Sabres**	**NE**	**82**	**45**	**27**	**10**	**235**	**207**	100
**4**	**Pittsburgh Penguins**	**AT**	**82**	**47**	**28**	**7**	**257**	**237**	101
**5**	**Ottawa Senators**	**NE**	**82**	**44**	**32**	**6**	**225**	**238**	94
**6**	**Boston Bruins**	**NE**	**82**	**39**	**30**	**13**	**206**	**200**	91
**7**	**Philadelphia Flyers**	**AT**	**82**	**41**	**35**	**6**	**236**	**225**	88
**8**	**Montreal Canadiens**	**NE**	**82**	**39**	**33**	**10**	**217**	**223**	88
8.5
9	New York Rangers	AT	82	38	33	11	222	218	87
10	Atlanta Thrashers	SE	82	35	34	13	234	256	83
11	Carolina Hurricanes	SE	82	35	37	10	230	256	80
12	Tampa Bay Lightning	SE	82	34	36	12	217	260	80
13	New York Islanders	AT	82	34	37	11	222	264	79
14	Florida Panthers	SE	82	32	37	13	208	244	77
15	Toronto Maple Leafs	NE	82	30	38	14	214	267	74

bold – Qualified for playoffs; y – Won division; p – Won Presidents' Trophy (and division)

AT – Atlantic Division, NE – Northeast Division, SE – Southeast Division

=== Game log ===
2009–10 Game Log
October : 8–2–1 (Home: 4–1–1; Road: 4–1–0)

Game	Date	Opponent	Score	Decision	Location/Attendance	Record
1	October 3	Montreal Canadiens	1-2 (OTL)	Miller	HSBC Arena – 18,690	0-0-1
2	October 8	Phoenix Coyotes	2-1	Miller	HSBC Arena – 18,690	1-0-1
3	October 10	Nashville Predators	1-0	Miller	Sommet Center – 14,209	2-0-1
4	October 13	Detroit Red Wings	6-2	Miller	HSBC Arena – 17,459	3-0-1
5	October 16	New York Islanders	6-3	Miller	HSBC Arena – 18,690	4-0-1
6	October 17	Atlanta Thrashers	2-4	Lalime	HSBC Arena – 18,690	4-1-1
7	October 21	Florida Panthers	5-2	Miller	BankAtlantic Center – 12,607	5-1-1
8	October 24	Tampa Bay Lightning	3-2 (SOW)	Miller	St. Pete Times Forum – 15,804	6-1-1
9	October 28	New Jersey Devils	4-1	Miller	Prudential Center – 14,182	7-1-1
10	October 30	Toronto Maple Leafs	3-2 (OTW)	Miller	HSBC Arena – 18,300	8-1-1
11	October 31	New York Islanders	0-5	Miller	Nassau Veterans Mem. Coliseum – 8,889	8-2-1

November: 7–5–1 (Home: 4–2–1; Road: 3–3–0)

Game	Date	Opponent	Score	Decision	Location/Attendance	Record
12	November 4	New York Islanders	3-0	Miller	HSBC Arena – 17,626	9-2-1
13	November 6	Philadelphia Flyers	2-5	Miller	HSBC Arena – 18,525	9-3-1
14	November 7	Boston Bruins	2-4	Enroth	TD Garden – 17,565	9-4-1
15	November 11	Edmonton Oilers	3-1	Miller	HSBC Arena – 17,797	10-4-1
16	November 13	Calgary Flames	2-1 (SOW)	Miller	HSBC Arena – 18,690	11-4-1
17	November 14	Philadelphia Flyers	3-2	Miller	Wachovia Center – 19,641	12-4-1
18	November 18	Florida Panthers	2-6	Miller	HSBC Arena – 18,546	12-5-1
19	November 20	Boston Bruins	1-2 (OTL)	Miller	HSBC Arena – 18,291	12-5-2
20	November 21	Ottawa Senators	3-5	Lalime	Scotiabank Place – 17,206	12-6-2
21	November 25	Washington Capitals	0-2	Miller	Verizon Center – 18,277	12-7-2
22	November 27	Philadelphia Flyers	4-2	Miller	Wachovia Center – 19,673	13-7-2
23	November 28	Carolina Hurricanes	5-1	Miller	HSBC Arena – 18,690	14-7-2
24	November 30	Toronto Maple Leafs	3-0	Miller	Air Canada Centre – 19,110	15-7-2

December: 9–4–2 (Home: 5–2–2; Road: 4–2–0)

Game	Date	Opponent	Score	Decision	Location/Attendance	Record
25	December 3	Montreal Canadiens	6-2	Miller	HSBC Arena – 18,690	16-7-2
26	December 5	New York Rangers	1-2	Miller	HSBC Arena – 18,301	16-8-2
27	December 7	New Jersey Devils	0-3	Miller	HSBC Arena – 18,690	16-9-2
28	December 9	Washington Capitals	3-0	Miller	HSBC Arena – 17,982	17-9-2
29	December 11	Chicago Blackhawks	2-1	Lalime	HSBC Arena – 18,009	18-9-2
30	December 12	New York Rangers	3-2	Miller	Madison Square Garden – 18,200	19-9-2
31	December 14	Montreal Canadiens	4-3	Miller	Bell Centre – 21,273	20-9-2
32	December 16	Ottawa Senators	0-2	Miller	Scotiabank Place – 16,917	20-10-2
33	December 18	Toronto Maple Leafs	5-2	Miller	HSBC Arena – 18,159	21-10-2
34	December 19	Pittsburgh Penguins	1-2 (OTL)	Lalime	HSBC Arena – 18,690	21-10-3
35	December 21	Toronto Maple Leafs	3-2	Miller	Air Canada Centre – 19,235	22-10-3
36	December 23	Washington Capitals	2-5	Miller	Verizon Center – 18,277	22-11-3
37	December 26	Ottawa Senators	2-3 (OTL)	Miller	HSBC Arena -18,690	22-11-4
38	December 27	St. Louis Blues	5-3	Lalime	Scottrade Center -19,150	23-11-4
39	December 29	Pittsburgh Penguins	4-3	Lalime	HSBC Arena -18,690	24-11-4

January: 8–3–3 (Home: 5–0–1; Road: 3–3–2)

Game	Date	Opponent	Score	Decision	Location/Attendance	Record
40	January 1	Atlanta Thrashers	4-3	Miller	HSBC Arena – 18,690	25-11-4
41	January 3	Montreal Canadiens	1-0	Miller	Bell Centre – 21,273	26-11-4
42	January 6	Tampa Bay Lightning	5-3	Miller	HSBC Arena – 18,690	27-11-4
43	January 8	Toronto Maple Leafs	3-2	Miller	HSBC Arena – 18,690	28-11-4
44	January 9	Colorado Avalanche	3-4 (OTL)	Lalime	HSBC Arena – 18,690	28-11-5
45	January 14	Atlanta Thrashers	2-1	Miller	Philips Arena – 11,313	29-11-5
46	January 16	New York Islanders	2-3 (SOL)	Miller	Nassau Veterans Memorial Coliseum – 13,635	29-11-6
47	January 18	Phoenix Coyotes	7-2	Miller	Jobing.com Arena – 11,309	30-11-6
48	January 19	Anaheim Ducks	4-5	Lalime	Honda Center – 15,570	30-12-6
49	January 21	Los Angeles Kings	3-4 (SOL)	Miller	Staples Center – 16,884	30-12-7
50	January 23	San Jose Sharks	2-5	Miller	HP Pavilion – 17,562	30-13-7
51	January 25	Vancouver Canucks	2-3	Miller	General Motors Place – 18,810	30-14-7
52	January 27	New Jersey Devils	2-1 (SOW)	Miller	HSBC Arena – 18,690	31-14-7
53	January 29	Boston Bruins	2-1	Miller	HSBC Arena – 18690	32-14-7

February: 1–4–2 (Home: 1–2–1; Road: 0–2–1)

Game	Date	Opponent	Score	Decision	Location/Attendance	Record
54	February 1	Pittsburgh Penguins	4-5	Miller	Mellon Arena – 17,029	32-15-7
55	February 3	Ottawa Senators	2-4	Miller	HSBC Arena – 18,690	32-16-7
56	February 5	Carolina Hurricanes	3-4	Miller	HSBC Arena – 18,690	32-17-7
57	February 6	Columbus Blue Jackets	0-4	Lalime	Nationwide Arena – 18,576	32-18-7
58	February 9	Boston Bruins	3-4 (OT)	Miller	HSBC Arena – 18,690	32-18-8
59	February 11	Carolina Hurricanes	2-3 (OT)	Miller	RBC Center – 15,527	32-18-9
60	February 13	San Jose Sharks	3-1	Miller	HSBC Arena – 18,690	33-18-9

March: 10–5–1 (Home: 5–3–0; Road: 5–2–1)

Game	Date	Opponent	Score	Decision	Location/Attendance	Record
61	March 2	Pittsburgh Penguins	2-3	Lalime	Mellon Arena – 17,132	33-19-9
62	March 3	Washington Capitals	1-3	Miller	HSBC Arena – 18,690	33-20-9
63	March 5	Philadelphia Flyers	3-2 (OT)	Miller	HSBC Arena – 18,690	34-20-9
64	March 7	New York Rangers	2-1 (OT)	Miller	Madison Square Garden – 18,200	35-20-9
65	March 10	Dallas Stars	5-3	Miller	HSBC Arena – 18,690	36-20-9
66	March 12	Minnesota Wild	2-3	Lalime	HSBC Arena – 18,690	36-21-9
67	March 13	Detroit Red Wings	2-3 (OT)	Miller	Joe Louis Arena – 20,066	36-21-10
68	March 16	Atlanta Thrashers	3-4	Lalime	Philips Arena – 12,540	36-22-10
69	March 18	Tampa Bay Lightning	6-2	Miller	St. Pete Times Forum – 16,868	37-22-10
70	March 20	Florida Panthers	3-1	Miller	BankAtlantic Center – 18,217	38-22-10
71	March 21	Carolina Hurricanes	5-3	Miller	RBC Center – 15,311	39-22-10
72	March 24	Montreal Canadiens	3-2 (SOW)	Miller	HSBC Arena – 18,690	40-22-10
73	March 26	Ottawa Senators	2-4	Miller	HSBC Arena – 18,690	40-23-10
74	March 27	Tampa Bay Lightning	7-1	Lalime	HSBC Arena – 18,690	41-23-10
75	March 29	Boston Bruins	3-2	Miller	TD Garden – 17,565	42-23-10
76	March 31	Florida Panthers	6-2	Miller	HSBC Arena – 18,690	43-23-10

April: 2–4–0 (Home: 1–0–0; Road: 1–4–0)

Game	Date	Opponent	Score	Decision	Location/Attendance	Record
77	April 1	Toronto Maple Leafs	2-4	Miller	Air Canada Centre	43-24-10
78	April 3	Montreal Canadiens	0-3	Miller	Bell Centre	43-25-10
79	April 6	New York Rangers	5-2	Miller	HSBC Arena	44-25-10
80	April 8	Boston Bruins	1-3	Lalime	TD Garden	44-26-10
81	April 10	Ottawa Senators	5-2	Miller	Scotiabank Place	45-26-10
82	April 11	New Jersey Devils	1-2	Lalime	Prudential Center	45-27-10

2009–10 Schedule

== Playoffs ==
The Sabres qualified for the playoffs for the first time in three years. They had not qualified for the playoffs since winning the Presidents' Trophy in the 2006–07 NHL season.

=== Playoff log ===
2010 Stanley Cup playoffs

Eastern Conference Quarter-finals vs #6 Boston Bruins : 2–4 (Home: 2–1; Road: 0–3)
#	Date	Visitor	Score	Home	OT	Boston goals	Buffalo goals	Decision	Attendance	Series	Recap
1	April 15	Boston Bruins	1 – 2	Buffalo Sabres		Recchi	Vanek, Rivet	Miller	18,690	1–0
2	April 17	Boston Bruins	5 – 3	Buffalo Sabres		Ryder (2), Chara (2), Recchi	Myers, Ellis, Pominville	Miller	18,690	1–1
3	April 19	Buffalo Sabres	1 – 2	Boston Bruins		Wideman, Bergeron	Grier	Miller	17,565	1–2
4	April 21	Buffalo Sabres	2 – 3	Boston Bruins	27:41	Krejci, Bergeron, Satan	Kennedy, Montador	Miller	17,565	1–3
5	April 23	Boston Bruins	1 – 4	Buffalo Sabres		Boychuk	Mair, Pominville, Grier, Ennis	Miller	18,690	2–3
6	April 26	Buffalo Sabres	3 – 4	Boston Bruins		Krejci (2), Recchi, Satan	Kaleta, Gerbe, Vanek	Miller	17,565	2–4

- Scorer of game-winning goal in italics
  - Denotes if necessary

== Player statistics ==
=== Skaters ===
Note: GP = Games played; G = Goals; A = Assists; Pts = Points; +/− = Plus/minus; PIM = Penalty minutes

Regular season

Player	GP	G	A	Pts	+/−	PIM
Derek Roy	80	26	43	69	+9	48
Tim Connolly	73	17	48	65	+10	28
Jason Pominville	82	24	38	62	+13	22
Thomas Vanek	71	28	25	53	+9	42
Tyler Myers	82	11	37	48	+13	32
Jochen Hecht	79	21	21	42	+14	35
Drew Stafford	71	14	20	34	+4	35
Tim Kennedy	78	10	16	26	−3	50
Clarke MacArthur^{‡}	60	13	13	26	−14	47
Steve Montador	78	5	18	23	+0	75
Paul Gaustad	65	12	10	22	−7	82
Mike Grier	73	10	12	22	−4	14
Chris Butler	59	1	20	21	−15	22
Toni Lydman	67	4	16	20	+10	30
Henrik Tallinder	82	4	16	20	+13	32
Patrick Kaleta	55	10	5	15	+2	89
Craig Rivet	78	1	14	15	−6	100
Adam Mair	69	6	8	14	−2	73
Matt Ellis	72	3	10	13	−1	12
Andrej Sekera	49	4	7	11	−1	6
Tyler Ennis	10	3	6	9	+1	6
Raffi Torres^{†}	14	0	5	5	−3	2
Nathan Gerbe	10	2	3	5	+1	4
Mark Mancari	6	1	1	2	+3	4
Nathan Paetsch^{‡}	11	1	1	2	+2	6
Daniel Paille^{‡}	2	0	1	1	+1	0

Playoffs

Player	GP	G	A	Pts	+/−	PIM
Jason Pominville	6	2	2	4	−1	2
Tyler Ennis	6	1	3	4	+1	0
Thomas Vanek	3	2	1	3	+1	2
Tim Kennedy	6	1	2	3	+3	4
Mike Grier	6	2	0	2	+0	2
Henrik Tallinder	6	0	2	2	+2	2
Adam Mair	6	1	1	2	+2	4
Raffi Torres	4	0	2	2	+1	12
Derek Roy	6	0	2	2	+2	4
Cody McCormick	3	0	2	2	+1	14
Patrick Kaleta	6	1	1	2	+4	22
Nathan Gerbe	2	1	1	2	+2	0
Craig Rivet	6	1	0	1	+2	11
Toni Lydman	6	0	1	1	+1	6
Tim Connolly	6	0	1	1	−2	2
Paul Gaustad	6	0	1	1	+1	8
Steve Montador	6	1	0	1	+3	4
Matt Ellis	3	1	0	1	+1	0
Tyler Myers	6	1	0	1	+0	4
Drew Stafford	3	0	0	0	+0	0
Andrej Sekera	6	0	0	0	+2	7

=== Goaltenders ===
Note: GP = Games played; TOI = Time on ice (minutes); W = Wins; L = Losses; OT = Overtime losses; GA = Goals against; GAA= Goals against average; SA= Shots against; SV= Saves; Sv% = Save percentage; SO= Shutouts

Regular season

Player	GP	TOI	W	L	OT	GA	GAA	SA	Sv%	SO	G	A	PIM
Ryan Miller	69	4047:10	41	18	8	150	2.22	2098	.929	5	0	0	4
Patrick Lalime	16	853:47	4	8	2	40	2.81	432	.907	0	0	0	2
Jhonas Enroth	1	58:18	0	1	0	4	4.14	37	.892	0	0	0	0

Playoffs

Player	GP	TOI	W	L	GA	GAA	SA	Sv%	SO	G	A	PIM
Ryan Miller	6	383:30	2	4	15	2.34	204	.926	0	0	0	2

^{†}Denotes player spent time with another team before joining Sabres. Stats reflect time with Sabres only.
^{‡}Traded mid-season. Stats reflect time with Sabres only.

== Awards and records ==
=== Awards ===
Regular Season
Player	Award	Reached
Tyler Myers	NHL Rookie of the Month	January 2010
Tyler Myers	Calder Memorial Trophy winner	June 23, 2010
Ryan Miller	Vezina Trophy winner	June 23, 2010

=== Milestones ===
Regular Season
Player	Milestone	Reached
Tyler Myers	1st Career NHL Game	October 3, 2009
Tyler Myers	1st Career NHL Assist; 1st Career NHL Point	October 8, 2009
Tim Kennedy	1st Career NHL Assist; 1st Career NHL Point	October 10, 2009
Tyler Myers	1st Career NHL Goal	October 16, 2009
Tim Kennedy	1st Career NHL Goal	October 28, 2009
Tyler Ennis	1st Career NHL Game; 1st Career NHL Goal	November 13, 2009
Tim Connolly	300th NHL Point	November 27, 2009

== Transactions ==
The Sabres have been involved in the following transactions during the 2009–10 season.

=== Trades ===
Date	Details
October 20, 2009	To Boston Bruins Daniel Paille	To Buffalo Sabres 3rd-round pick in 2010; Conditional 4th-round pick in 2010 (Note: Condition not satisfied.)
March 3, 2010	To Columbus Blue Jackets Nathan Paetsch; 2nd-round pick in 2010	To Buffalo Sabres Raffi Torres
March 3, 2010	To Atlanta Thrashers Clarke MacArthur	To Buffalo Sabres 3rd-round pick in 2010; 4th-round pick in 2010

=== Free agents acquired ===
Player	Former team	Contract terms
Steve Montador	Boston Bruins	2 years, $3.1 million
Joe DiPenta	Frolunda HC	1 year, $550,000
Jean-Philippe Lamoureux	Alaska Aces	1 year
Cody McCormick	Colorado Avalanche	1 year, $522,500
Mike Grier	San Jose Sharks	1 year
Jeff Cowan	Vancouver Canucks	Undisclosed

=== Free agents lost ===
Player	New team	Contract terms
Mikael Tellqvist	Ak Bars Kazan	1 year, $1.3 million
Jaroslav Spacek	Montreal Canadiens	3 years, $11.5 million
Maxim Afinogenov	Atlanta Thrashers	1 year, $800,000
Dominic Moore	Florida Panthers	1 year

=== Claimed via waivers ===
Player	Former team	Date claimed off waivers

=== Lost via waivers ===
Player	New team	Date claimed off waivers

=== Lost via retirement ===
Player
Teppo Numminen

=== Player signings ===
Player	Contract terms
Tyler Myers	3 years
Paul Byron	3 years
Matt Ellis	1 year
Patrick Kaleta	1 year, $522,500
Andrej Sekera	2 years, $2 million
Clarke MacArthur	1 year, $522,500
Drew Stafford	2 years, $3.8 million
Tyler Ennis	3-year entry-level contract
Mark Mancari	1 year
Luke Adam	3-year entry-level contract
Nick Crawford	3-year entry-level contract
Mike Grier	1 year

== Draft selections ==
The 2009 NHL entry draft was held June 26–27, 2009 at the Bell Centre in Montreal, Quebec.

2009 NHL Entry Draft Results – Buffalo Sabres
Round	Overall pick	Player	Nationality	Position	Team from	League from
1	13	Zack Kassian	Canada	RW	Peterborough Petes	OHL
3	66	Brayden McNabb	Canada	D	Kootenay Ice	WHL
4	104	Marcus Foligno	United States	LW	Sudbury Wolves	OHL
5	134	Mark Adams	United States	D	Malden Catholic High School	USHS-MA
6	164	Connor Knapp	United States	G	Miami University	CCHA
7	194	Maxime Legault	Canada	RW	Shawinigan Cataractes	QMJHL

=== Notes ===
* The Sabres' second-round pick went to the San Jose Sharks as the result of a trade on July 4, 2008 that sent Craig Rivet and a seventh-round pick in 2010 to Buffalo in exchange for a second-round pick in 2010 and this pick.

* The Los Angeles Kings' third-round pick went to the Sabres as the result of a trade on July 4, 2008 that sent Steve Bernier to the Vancouver Canucks for a second-round pick in 2010 and this pick.
Vancouver previously acquired in a trade on July 5, 2006 that sent Dan Cloutier to Los Angeles for a second-round pick in 2007 and this pick (being conditional at time of trade). The condition – Dan Cloutier resigning with the Los Angeles Kings – has been verified on September 27, 2006.

* The Sabres' third-round pick went to the Los Angeles Kings as the result of a trade on June 20, 2008 that sent a first-round pick in 2008 to Buffalo in exchange for a first-round pick in 2008 and this pick.

== See also ==
- 2009–10 NHL season

== Farm teams ==
=== Portland Pirates ===
The Portland Pirates remained Buffalo's top affiliate in the American Hockey League in 2009–10.
