= 2009–10 Pittsburgh Penguins season =

NHL team season

2009–10 Pittsburgh Penguins
- Division: 2nd Atlantic
- Conference: 4th Eastern
- 2009–10 record: 47–28–7
- Home record: 25–12–4
- Road record: 22–16–3
- Goals for: 257
- Goals against: 237

Team information
- General manager: Ray Shero
- Coach: Dan Bylsma
- Captain: Sidney Crosby
- Alternate captains: Sergei Gonchar; Evgeni Malkin
- Arena: Mellon Arena

Team leaders
- Goals: Sidney Crosby (51)
- Assists: Sidney Crosby (58)
- Points: Sidney Crosby (109)
- Penalty minutes: Michael Rupp (120)
- Plus/minus: Jordan Staal (+19)
- Wins: Marc-Andre Fleury (37)
- Goals against average: Alexander Pechurski (1.67)

The 2009–10 Pittsburgh Penguins season was the 43rd season of the franchise in the National Hockey League (NHL). The Penguins entered the season as defending Stanley Cup champions. It was scheduled to be the last season with the Penguins' home venue as Mellon Arena before they moved into their new arena, the Consol Energy Center, which was being constructed adjacent to the Mellon Arena across Centre Avenue.

The regular season began with a home game against the New York Rangers in which the Penguins held a banner-raising ceremony beforehand.

The Penguins qualified for the playoffs for the fourth consecutive season. They did not become champions of the Atlantic Division, but nonetheless finished in fourth place in the Eastern Conference with 101 points. They began the 2010 Stanley Cup playoffs on April 14 against the Ottawa Senators. They beat the Senators but they were upset in the Eastern Conference Semi-finals by the Montreal Canadiens, losing in seven games.

== Pre-season ==
2009 pre-season game log: 1–4–1 (home: 1–1–0; road: 0–3–1)

#	Date	Visitor	Score	Home	OT	Decision	Attendance	Record	Recap
1	September 15	Columbus Blue Jackets	4–5	Pittsburgh Penguins	OT	Fleury	15,766	1–0–0	Recap
2	September 18	Toronto Maple Leafs	4–3	Pittsburgh Penguins		Johnson	16,621	1–1–0	Recap
3	September 21	Pittsburgh Penguins	3–4	Montreal Canadiens		Curry	21,273	1–2–0	Recap
4	September 22	Pittsburgh Penguins	2–3	Toronto Maple Leafs	SO	Johnson	18,910	1–2–1	Recap
5	September 24	Pittsburgh Penguins	2–5	Columbus Blue Jackets		Fleury	12,638	1–3–1	Recap
6	September 27	Pittsburgh Penguins	1–4	Detroit Red Wings		Fleury	13,891	1–4–1	Recap

Legend: = Win = Loss = OT/SO Loss

== Regular season ==
=== First half: October to December ===
The Penguins began the 2009–10 season on Friday, October 2. Prior to the game the team raised the Stanley Cup banner at Mellon Arena. The ceremonial banner raising was shown on a video board outside Mellon Arena, which displayed highlights from the previous season during the days leading up the game. The Penguins won their opening night game over the New York Rangers and defeated the New York Islanders the following night. After their first loss of the season to the Phoenix Coyotes, the Penguins embarked on a four-game road trip to complete a series of five games in eight days. The Penguins swept the four game road trip, setting a new franchise record for consecutive road wins to start a season. The Penguins extended their overall win-streak to seven games by winning the first three games of their ensuing homestand; the win-streak ended with a loss to the New Jersey Devils on October 24.

The Penguins began November with a three-game road trip in California. After defeating the Anaheim Ducks, the Penguins lost their first back-to-back games of the season to the Los Angeles Kings and the San Jose Sharks. The team then lost to the Boston Bruins and New Jersey Devils. During the four-game losing streak, the Penguins were outscored 17–3. Against the Bruins, Sidney Crosby did not score a point for the fifth-consecutive game, the longest point-drought of his career. The Penguins ended their skid with a 6–5 overtime victory against Boston on November 14. Bill Guerin tied the game with .04 second left, and Pascal Dupuis scored in overtime.

Extended injuries hindered the team throughout much of the early season. On November 16, the Penguins played without four of the six defenceman that had started with the team. Additionally, they were without forwards Tyler Kennedy, Maxime Talbot and Chris Kunitz. Evgeni Malkin had also missed significant time. Later in the week, it was announced that defenceman Jay McKee would miss two to four weeks, but that Sergei Gonchar and Maxime Talbot, who had surgery during the off-season, would both likely return on November 19.

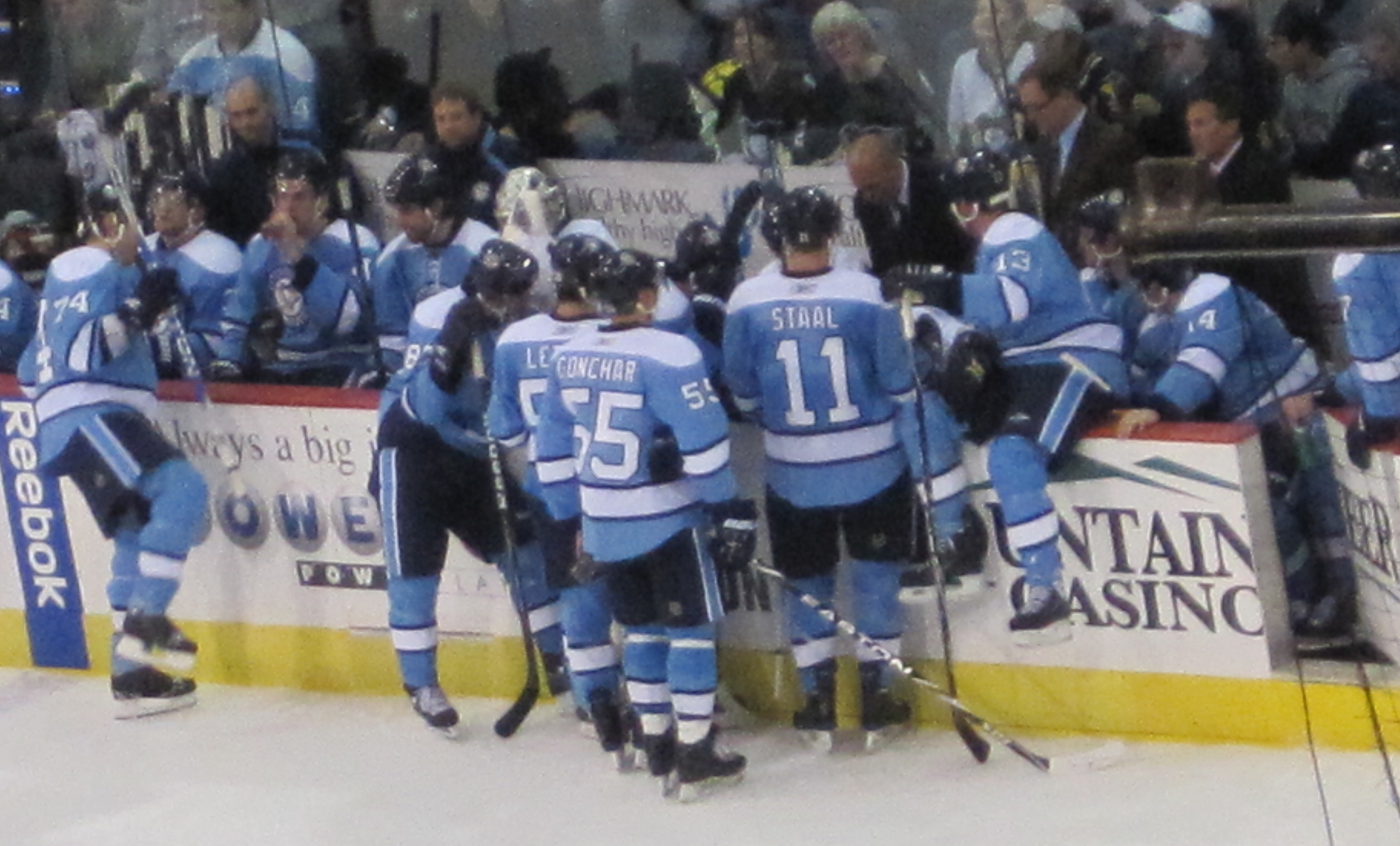
Team together during a time out

In late December through January 1, rosters for the 2010 Winter Olympics in Vancouver were announced, and five Penguins were selected. Malkin and Gonchar were selected to play for Russia, Sidney Crosby and Marc-Andre Fleury for Canada and Brooks Orpik for the United States.

The Penguins concluded the first half of their season with their 41st game on December 30 against the New Jersey Devils. Through the first 41 games, the Penguins earned a 26–14–1 record. While the Penguins won five straight in the middle of the month, they ending losing three in a row, and four of their last five, including shutouts of 0–2 and 0–4 to the Devils. The 0–4 shutout earned Devils' goalie Martin Brodeur his 104th career shutout and the NHL record.

=== Second half: January to April ===
The Penguins began the second half of their season with their 42nd game on January 2 against the Tampa Bay Lightning. The Penguins went on to lose both of their first two games of the second half of the season with the second coming against the Florida Panthers. The Penguins then returned home for a two-game home stand in which they split by first defeating the Atlanta Thrashers and then losing in a high scoring 7–4 contest to the Philadelphia Flyers. After the home stand, the Penguins embarked on a five-game road trip of Canada and Minnesota, in which they finished the trip with a decent 3–2 record with wins coming against the Toronto Maple Leafs, Calgary Flames and Edmonton Oilers. They battled with a struggling New Jersey Devils team for the Atlantic Division title, but ultimately fell short due in large part to having lost all six divisional games against the Devils. The Penguins had a 21–14–6 record in the second half of the season, placing them in fourth place in the Eastern Conference (despite having the third-best points total). It would be the third time in four years that the Penguins had over 100 points in a season (having missed out by a single point the previous year) and the fourth-straight year with 45 wins or more.

=== Game log ===
2009–2010 Schedule
October: 11–3–0 (Home: 5–3–0; Road: 6–1–0), 22 Points

#	Oct	Time (ET)	Visitor	Score	Home	Location/Attendance	Record	Points
1	2	7:30 PM	New York Rangers	2–3	Pittsburgh Penguins	Mellon Arena (17,132)	1–0–0	2
2	3	7:00 PM	Pittsburgh Penguins	4–3 SO	New York Islanders	Nassau Veterans Memorial Coliseum (16,234)	2–0–0	4
3	7	7:30 PM	Phoenix Coyotes	3–0	Pittsburgh Penguins	Mellon Arena (16,975)	2–1–0	4
4	8	7:00 PM	Pittsburgh Penguins	5–4	Philadelphia Flyers	Wells Fargo Center (19,611)	3–1–0	6
5	10	7:00 PM	Pittsburgh Penguins	5–2	Toronto Maple Leafs	Air Canada Centre (19,374)	4–1–0	8
6	12	7:30 PM	Pittsburgh Penguins	4–1	Ottawa Senators	Scotiabank Place (17,014)	5–1–0	10
7	14	7:00 PM	Pittsburgh Penguins	3–2 SO	Carolina Hurricanes	RBC Center (14,053)	6–1–0	12
8	17	7:30 PM	Tampa Bay Lightning	1–4	Pittsburgh Penguins	Mellon Arena (17,132)	7–1–0	14
9	20	7:00 PM	St. Louis Blues	1–5	Pittsburgh Penguins	Mellon Arena (17,132)	8–1–0	16
10	23	7:30 PM	Florida Panthers	2–3 SO	Pittsburgh Penguins	Mellon Arena (16,971)	9–1–0	18
11	24	7:30 PM	New Jersey Devils	4–1	Pittsburgh Penguins	Mellon Arena (17,132)	9–2–0	18
12	28	7:30 PM	Montreal Canadiens	1–6	Pittsburgh Penguins	Mellon Arena (16,965)	10–2–0	20
13	30	7:00 PM	Pittsburgh Penguins	4–3 SO	Columbus Blue Jackets	Nationwide Arena (19,136)	11–2–0	22
14	31	7:30 PM	Minnesota Wild	2–1	Pittsburgh Penguins	Mellon Arena (16,960)	11–3–0	22

November: 8–6–0 (Home: 4–1–0; Road: 4–5–0), 16 Points

#	Nov	Time (ET)	Visitor	Score	Home	Location/Attendance	Record	Points
15	3	10:00 PM	Pittsburgh Penguins	4–3	Anaheim Ducks	Honda Center (16,128)	12–3–0	24
16	5	10:30 PM	Pittsburgh Penguins	2–5	Los Angeles Kings	Staples Center (18,118)	12–4–0	24
17	7	10:30 PM	Pittsburgh Penguins	0–5	San Jose Sharks	HP Pavilion at San Jose (17,562)	12–5–0	24
18	10	7:00 PM	Pittsburgh Penguins	0–3	Boston Bruins	TD Garden (17,565)	12–6–0	24
19	12	7:30 PM	New Jersey Devils	4–1	Pittsburgh Penguins	Mellon Arena (17,005)	12–7–0	24
20	14	7:30 PM	Boston Bruins	5–6 OT	Pittsburgh Penguins	Mellon Arena (17,132)	13–7–0	26
21	16	7:30 PM	Anaheim Ducks	2–5	Pittsburgh Penguins	Mellon Arena (17,052)	14–7–0	28
22	19	7:30 PM	Pittsburgh Penguins	2–6	Ottawa Senators	Scotiabank Place (17,039)	14–8–0	28
23	21	7:00 PM	Pittsburgh Penguins	3–2	Atlanta Thrashers	Philips Arena (17,588)	15–8–0	30
24	23	7:30 PM	Pittsburgh Penguins	3–2 OT	Florida Panthers	BankAtlantic Center (17,024)	16–8–0	32
25	25	7:30 PM	Montreal Canadiens	1–3	Pittsburgh Penguins	Mellon Arena (17,094)	17–8–0	34
26	27	2:00 PM	Pittsburgh Penguins	2–3	New York Islanders	Nassau Veterans Memorial Coliseum (15,262)	17–9–0	34
27	28	7:30 PM	New York Rangers	3–8	Pittsburgh Penguins	Mellon Arena (17,122)	18–9–0	36
28	30	7:00 PM	Pittsburgh Penguins	5–2	New York Rangers	Madison Square Garden (IV) (18,200)	19–9–0	38

December: 7–5–1 (Home: 4–3–1; Road: 3–2–0), 15 Points

#	Dec	Time (ET)	Visitor	Score	Home	Location/Attendance	Record	Points
29	3	7:30 PM	Colorado Avalanche	1–4	Pittsburgh Penguins	Mellon Arena (16,968)	20–9–0	40
30	5	7:30 PM	Chicago Blackhawks	2–1 OT	Pittsburgh Penguins	Mellon Arena (17,132)	20–9–1	41
31	7	7:30 PM	Carolina Hurricanes	3–2	Pittsburgh Penguins	Mellon Arena (16,964)	20–10–1	41
32	10	7:30 PM	Pittsburgh Penguins	3–2	Montreal Canadiens	Bell Centre (21,273)	21–10–1	43
33	12	7:30 PM	Florida Panthers	2–3 OT	Pittsburgh Penguins	Mellon Arena (16,977)	22–10–1	45
34	15	7:00 PM	Philadelphia Flyers	1–6	Pittsburgh Penguins	Mellon Arena (17,086)	23–10–1	47
35	17	7:00 PM	Pittsburgh Penguins	3–2 SO	Philadelphia Flyers	Wachovia Center (19,689)	24–10–1	49
36	19	7:00 PM	Pittsburgh Penguins	2–1 SO	Buffalo Sabres	HSBC Arena (18,690)	25–10–1	51
37	21	7:30 PM	New Jersey Devils	4–0	Pittsburgh Penguins	Mellon Arena (17,132)	25–11–1	51
38	23	7:00 PM	Ottawa Senators	2–8	Pittsburgh Penguins	Mellon Arena (17,132)	26–11–1	53
39	27	7:00 PM	Toronto Maple Leafs	4–3	Pittsburgh Penguins	Mellon Arena (17,132)	26–12–1	53
40	29	7:00 PM	Pittsburgh Penguins	3–4	Buffalo Sabres	HSBC Arena (18,690)	26–13–1	53
41	30	7:00 PM	Pittsburgh Penguins	0–2	New Jersey Devils	Prudential Center (17,625)	26–14–1	53

January: 8–7–0 (Home: 3–3–0; Road: 5–4–0), 16 Points

#	Jan	Time (ET)	Visitor	Score	Home	Location/Attendance	Record	Points
42	2	3:00 PM	Pittsburgh Penguins	1–3	Tampa Bay Lightning	St. Pete Times Forum (20,109)	26–15–1	53
43	3	5:00 PM	Pittsburgh Penguins	2–6	Florida Panthers	BankAtlantic Center (18,110)	26–16–1	53
44	5	7:30 PM	Atlanta Thrashers	2–5	Pittsburgh Penguins	Mellon Arena (17,049)	27–16–1	55
45	7	7:30 PM	Philadelphia Flyers	7–4	Pittsburgh Penguins	Mellon Arena (17,095)	27–17–1	55
46	9	7:00 PM	Pittsburgh Penguins	4–1	Toronto Maple Leafs	Air Canada Centre (19,567)	28–17–1	57
47	11	8:00 PM	Pittsburgh Penguins	3–4	Minnesota Wild	Xcel Energy Center (19,044)	28–18–1	57
48	13	9:30 PM	Pittsburgh Penguins	3–1	Calgary Flames	Pengrowth Saddledome (19,289)	29–18–1	59
49	14	9:30 PM	Pittsburgh Penguins	3–2	Edmonton Oilers	Rexall Place (16,839)	30–18–1	61
50	16	10:00 PM	Pittsburgh Penguins	2–6	Vancouver Canucks	Rogers Arena (18,810)	30–19–1	61
51	19	7:30 PM	New York Islanders	4–6	Pittsburgh Penguins	Mellon Arena (16,981)	31–19–1	63
52	21	7:30 PM	Washington Capitals	6–3	Pittsburgh Penguins	Mellon Arena (17,132)	31–20–1	63
53	24	12:30 PM	Pittsburgh Penguins	2–1	Philadelphia Flyers	Wachovia Center (19,798)	32–20–1	65
54	25	7:00 PM	Pittsburgh Penguins	4–2	New York Rangers	Madison Square Garden (IV) (18,200)	33–20–1	67
55	28	7:00 PM	Ottawa Senators	4–1	Pittsburgh Penguins	Mellon Arena (17,084)	33–21–1	67
56	31	12:30 PM	Detroit Red Wings	1–2 SO	Pittsburgh Penguins	Mellon Arena (17,105)	34–21–1	69

February: 2–1–3 (Home: 2–0–2; Road: 0–1–1), 7 Points

#	Feb	Time (ET)	Visitor	Score	Home	Location/Attendance	Record	Points
57	1	7:00 PM	Buffalo Sabres	4–5	Pittsburgh Penguins	Mellon Arena (17,029)	35–21–1	71
58	6	2:00 PM	Pittsburgh Penguins	3–5	Montreal Canadiens	Bell Centre (21,273)	35–22–1	71
59	7	12:00 PM	Pittsburgh Penguins	4–5 OT	Washington Capitals	Verizon Center (18,277)	35–22–2	72
60	10	7:30 PM	New York Islanders	1–3	Pittsburgh Penguins	Mellon Arena (16,980)	36–22–2	74
61	12	7:30 PM	New York Rangers	3–2 OT	Pittsburgh Penguins	Mellon Arena (17,132)	36–22–3	75
62	14	1:00 PM	Nashville Predators	4–3 SO	Pittsburgh Penguins	Mellon Arena (17,132)	36–22–4	76

March: 8–4–2 (Home: 5–1–1; Road: 3–3–2), 18 Points

#	Mar	Time (ET)	Visitor	Score	Home	Location/Attendance	Record	Points
63	2	7:30 PM	Buffalo Sabres	2–3	Pittsburgh Penguins	Mellon Arena (17,132)	37–22–4	78
64	4	7:00 PM	Pittsburgh Penguins	5–4 OT	New York Rangers	Madison Square Garden (IV) (18,200)	38–22–4	80
65	6	1:00 PM	Dallas Stars	3–6	Pittsburgh Penguins	Mellon Arena (17,132)	39–22–4	82
66	7	3:00 PM	Boston Bruins	1–2	Pittsburgh Penguins	Mellon Arena (17,132)	40–22–4	84
67	11	7:00 PM	Pittsburgh Penguins	3–4 OT	Carolina Hurricanes	RBC Center (16,426)	40–22–5	85
68	12	7:00 PM	Pittsburgh Penguins	1–3	New Jersey Devils	Prudential Center (17,625)	40–23–5	85
69	14	5:00 PM	Pittsburgh Penguins	2–1	Tampa Bay Lightning	St. Pete Times Forum (20,230)	41–23–5	87
70	17	7:00 PM	Pittsburgh Penguins	2–5	New Jersey Devils	Prudential Center (17,625)	41–24–5	87
71	18	7:00 PM	Pittsburgh Penguins	3–0	Boston Bruins	TD Garden (17,565)	42–24–5	89
72	20	1:00 PM	Carolina Hurricanes	3–2 OT	Pittsburgh Penguins	Mellon Arena (17,090)	42–24–6	90
73	22	7:00 PM	Pittsburgh Penguins	1–3	Detroit Red Wings	Joe Louis Arena (20,066)	42–25–6	90
74	24	7:00 PM	Pittsburgh Penguins	3–4 SO	Washington Capitals	Verizon Center (18,277)	42–25–7	91
75	27	1:00 PM	Philadelphia Flyers	1–4	Pittsburgh Penguins	Mellon Arena (17,132)	43–25–7	93
76	28	5:00 PM	Toronto Maple Leafs	4–5 SO	Pittsburgh Penguins	Mellon Arena (17,104)	44–25–7	95
77	31	7:30 PM	Tampa Bay Lightning	2–0	Pittsburgh Penguins	Mellon Arena (17,132)	44–26–7	95

April: 3–2–0 (Home: 2–1–0; Road: 1–1–0), 6 Points

#	Apr	Time (ET)	Visitor	Score	Home	Location/Attendance	Record	Points
78	3	1:00 PM	Atlanta Thrashers	3–4 OT	Pittsburgh Penguins	Mellon Arena (17,047)	45–26–7	97
79	6	7:30 PM	Washington Capitals	6–3	Pittsburgh Penguins	Mellon Arena (17,132)	45–27–7	97
80	8	7:30 PM	New York Islanders	3–7	Pittsburgh Penguins	Mellon Arena (17,132)	46–27–7	99
81	10	7:00 PM	Pittsburgh Penguins	0–1	Atlanta Thrashers	Philips Arena (18,959)	46–28–7	99
82	11	5:00 PM	Pittsburgh Penguins	6–5 OT	New York Islanders	Nassau Veterans Memorial Coliseum (16,250)	47–28–7	101

Legend: = Win = Loss = OT/SO Loss

=== Standings ===
Atlantic Division

Atlantic Division
		GP	W	L	OTL	GF	GA	Pts
**1**	**New Jersey Devils**	**82**	**48**	**27**	**7**	**222**	**191**	**103**
**2**	**Pittsburgh Penguins**	**82**	**47**	**28**	**7**	**257**	**237**	**101**
**3**	**Philadelphia Flyers**	**82**	**41**	**35**	**6**	**236**	**225**	**88**
4	New York Rangers	82	38	33	11	222	218	87
5	New York Islanders	82	34	37	11	222	264	79

Eastern Conference

Eastern Conference
R		Div	GP	W	L	OTL	GF	GA	Pts
**1**	**p – Washington Capitals**	**SE**	**82**	**54**	**15**	**13**	**318**	**233**	121
**2**	**y – New Jersey Devils**	**AT**	**82**	**48**	**27**	**7**	**222**	**191**	103
**3**	**y – Buffalo Sabres**	**NE**	**82**	**45**	**27**	**10**	**235**	**207**	100
**4**	**Pittsburgh Penguins**	**AT**	**82**	**47**	**28**	**7**	**257**	**237**	101
**5**	**Ottawa Senators**	**NE**	**82**	**44**	**32**	**6**	**225**	**238**	94
**6**	**Boston Bruins**	**NE**	**82**	**39**	**30**	**13**	**206**	**200**	91
**7**	**Philadelphia Flyers**	**AT**	**82**	**41**	**35**	**6**	**236**	**225**	88
**8**	**Montreal Canadiens**	**NE**	**82**	**39**	**33**	**10**	**217**	**223**	88
8.5
9	New York Rangers	AT	82	38	33	11	222	218	87
10	Atlanta Thrashers	SE	82	35	34	13	234	256	83
11	Carolina Hurricanes	SE	82	35	37	10	230	256	80
12	Tampa Bay Lightning	SE	82	34	36	12	217	260	80
13	New York Islanders	AT	82	34	37	11	222	264	79
14	Florida Panthers	SE	82	32	37	13	208	244	77
15	Toronto Maple Leafs	NE	82	30	38	14	214	267	74

bold – Qualified for playoffs; y – Won division; p – Won Presidents' Trophy (and division)

AT – Atlantic Division, NE – Northeast Division, SE – Southeast Division

=== Detailed records ===
Final

**Eastern Conference**
Atlantic	GP	W	L	OT	SHOTS	GF	GA	PP	PK	FO W–L
New Jersey Devils	6	0	6	0	187–165	5	22	0–21	3–17	155–144
New York Islanders	6	5	1	0	192–211	28	19	7–28	5–30	228–169
New York Rangers	6	5	0	1	207–168	27	16	7–21	3–20	176–167
Philadelphia Flyers	6	5	1	0	182–180	24	16	7–28	7–31	179–190
**Pittsburgh Penguins**										
Division Total	24	15	8	1	768–724	84	73	21–98	18–98	738–670

Northeast	GP	W	L	OT	SHOTS	GF	GA	PP	PK	FO W–L
Boston Bruins	4	3	1	0	124–101	11	9	0–10	2–13	95–127
Buffalo Sabres	4	3	1	0	121–118	13	11	2–11	3–21	107–103
Montreal Canadiens	4	3	1	0	129–96	15	9	2–15	3–13	97–123
Ottawa Senators	4	2	2	0	122–137	15	13	4–20	1–17	122–120
Toronto Maple Leafs	4	3	1	0	141–119	17	11	5–13	3–15	130–107
Division Total	20	14	6	0	637–571	71	53	13–69	12–79	551–580

Southeast	GP	W	L	OT	SHOTS	GF	GA	PP	PK	FO W–L
Atlanta Thrashers	4	3	1	0	139–112	12	8	4–17	1–15	104–138
Carolina Hurricanes	4	1	1	2	135–100	10	12	2–12	2–17	100–114
Florida Panthers	4	3	1	0	176–116	11	12	3–20	2–13	131–118
Tampa Bay Lightning	4	2	2	0	125–99	7	7	2–20	2–18	105–106
Washington Capitals	4	0	2	2	144–128	13	21	3–19	4–8	121–127
Division Total	20	9	7	4	719–555	53	60	14–88	11–71	561–603
Conference Total	64	38	21	5	2124–1850	208	186	48–255	41–248	1850–1853

**Western Conference**
Central	GP	W	L	OT	SHOTS	GF	GA	PP	PK	FO W–L
Chicago Blackhawks	1	0	0	1	33–31	1	2	0–1	0–3	30–44
Columbus Blue Jackets	1	1	0	0	32–32	4	3	0–5	1–7	29–34
Detroit Red Wings	2	1	1	0	74–57	3	4	0–4	0–9	46–73
Nashville Predators	1	0	0	1	33–26	3	4	1–4	1–7	33–24
St. Louis Blues	1	1	0	0	43–23	5	1	2–4	0–2	21–30
Division Total	6	3	1	2	215–169	16	14	3–18	2–28	159–205

Northwest	GP	W	L	OT	SHOTS	GF	GA	PP	PK	FO W–L
Calgary Flames	1	1	0	0	27–38	3	1	1–5	1–5	27–30
Colorado Avalanche	1	1	0	0	33–16	4	1	1–4	1–3	30–29
Edmonton Oilers	1	1	0	0	31–35	3	2	1–2	2–4	25–36
Minnesota Wild	2	0	2	0	73–39	4	6	0–9	0–4	54–58
Vancouver Canucks	1	0	1	0	24–27	2	6	0–3	1–6	25–29
Division Total	6	3	3	0	188–155	16	16	3–23	5–22	161–182

Pacific	GP	W	L	OT	SHOTS	GF	GA	PP	PK	FO W–L
Anaheim Ducks	2	2	0	0	53–54	9	5	1–13	0–5	55–47
Dallas Stars	1	1	0	0	34–30	6	3	1–5	0–6	38–35
Los Angeles Kings	1	0	1	0	23–32	2	5	0–3	0–3	23–35
Phoenix Coyotes	1	0	1	0	24–25	0	3	0–5	2–9	26–27
San Jose Sharks	1	0	1	0	27–35	0	5	0–4	2–6	30–28
Division Total	6	3	3	0	161–176	17	21	2–30	4–29	172–172
Conference Total	18	9	7	2	564–500	49	51	8–71	11–79	492–559
NHL Total	82	47	28	7	2688–2350	257	237	56–326	52–327	2342–2412

== Stanley Cup playoffs ==
The Penguins advanced to the Stanley Cup playoffs for the fourth consecutive season. They earned the fourth seed in the Eastern Conference and home-ice advantage in the opening round match-up with the Ottawa Senators. The Penguins defeated the Senators 4–2 and advanced to face the eighth-seeded Montreal Canadiens.

=== Eastern Conference Quarter-finals ===
The Penguins lost Game 1 of the series 5–4. The Penguins took an early 1–0 lead when Evgeni Malkin scored at 3:03 into the first period on the power play, but finished the first period trailing the Senators 2–1 after Peter Regin and Chris Neil both scored on rebounds. The Senators extended their lead to 3–1 early in the second period on the power play when Marc-Andre Fleury was caught out of the net on an odd bounce off of the end board in which Chris Kelly put into the open net. Malkin managed to decrease the deficit to 3–2 with his second power play goal of the night near the midway point of the second period. The Senators' lead was then re-extended the lead 3 minutes later when Erik Karlsson scored on the power play. Five minutes into the third period, Craig Adams scored on a backhand shot to decrease the Senators' lead back to one goal, but almost five minutes later, ex-Penguin Jarkko Ruutu scored what would be the game-winning goal. Alex Goligoski scored to make the score 5–4 with about a minute and a half off of a no-look feed from Sidney Crosby behind the net.

Looking to tie the series at 1–1 in Game 2, things did not get off on the right foot, with the Senators' Peter Regin scoring 18 seconds into the game to take an early 1–0 lead. Sidney Crosby leveled the game 8 minutes later, knocking in a rebound off of a Chris Kunitz shot. After a scoreless second period, Kris Letang scored the game-winner at 16:48 in the third period on a slap shot with the assist from Crosby, who passed to Letang after falling to his knees. The Penguins were able to fend off the Senators for the remainder of the game and leveled the series at 1–1.

The series then turned to Scotiabank Place, the home of the Senators, for Game 3. The Penguins started the scoring 1:17 into the first when Alexei Ponikarovsky beat Senators goalie Brian Elliott to give the Penguins a 1–0 lead. Peter Regin then scored late in the first period, but the goal was eventually disallowed due to the fact that the puck was scored by a clear kicking motion. Early in the second period, Mike Fisher scored on a power play to knot things up at 1–1. Evgeni Malkin and Sidney Crosby both went on to score goals in the second, with Crosby's coming on a power play to give the Penguins a 3–1 advantage after 2 periods. Bill Guerin extended the lead to 4–1 when he slotted home a shot on a breakaway. The Senators put on the pressure late and managed to put another behind Marc-Andre Fleury, where Matt Cullen, on the power play, lifted a shot over Fleury's glove from a wide angle. The Senators pulled their goalie on a late power play to extend their man advantage to two, but failed to convert any shots to goals. The final score was 4–2 to give the Penguins a 2–1 series lead.

Two days later, the two clubs met again in Ottawa for Game 4. The first goal of the game came 11:50 into the first period when Evgeni Malkin scored on a power play slap shot to take a 1–0 lead into the first intermission. In the second period, Ottawa turned the puck over near their blue line and Sergei Gonchar fed Chris Kunitz who then tapped the puck into the offensive zone where Sidney Crosby uncovered gathered the puck and slotted it home past Elliott to take a 2–0 lead. 12 seconds later, Maxime Talbot fed Matt Cooke from the corner boards to the front of the goal to increase the scoreline to 3–0. Things got ugly for Ottawa 13 seconds later, when Crosby came into the offensive zone virtually untouched and put a wrist shot top far corner to extend the lead to 4. Senators goaltender Brian Elliott was then pulled and replaced by Pascal Leclaire. After the change, Ottawa managed to score two goals from Chris Neil and Daniel Alfredsson to decrease the Penguin lead to 4–2. The goal scoring then continued in the period when Maxime Talbot scored a short handed goal. Matt Cullen for Ottawa then scored on a 5-on-3 power play and finally Chris Kunitz scored for Pittsburgh with around two minutes left in the period to go into the intermission with a 6–3 lead. In the final period, the Senators scored on another 5-on-3 power play, with Jordan Staal scoring the last goal of the game on a backhand shot to end any hopes of a Senators comeback. The final score was 7–4 and Pittsburgh took a 3–1 series lead back to Pittsburgh.

In game five the Penguins looked to wrap up the series on home ice. In the first period, the Senators took an early 2–0 lead with Mike Fisher scoring at 10:25 on a power play and Jarkko Ruutu put another one past Marc-Andre Fleury a little over a minute later. Kris Letang scored on a slap shot during a power play at 18:05 in the period to decrease the Senators lead to 2–1 going into the first intermission. In the second period, neither sides could manage to score until Chris Kunitz put a wrist shot past Pascal Leclaire to knot things up a 2–2 with about a minute and a half left in the second period. In the third period, Sidney Crosby scored at 9:01 on a beautiful wrist shot goal sitting on his backside in front of goal that looked like it could be the series clincher. The Senators quickly responded though at 10:24 when Peter Regin put a slap shot past Fleury to tie the game back up at 3–3. The game then went into overtime and a winner wasn't found until 7:06 into the third overtime when Matt Carkner's slap shot hit Fleury and trickled past the goal line to give the Senators a 4–3 win and decrease the Penguins advantage in the series to 3–2.

=== Eastern Conference Semi-finals ===
In the second round of the playoffs, the Penguins faced the Montreal Canadiens. Games 1 & 2 began in Pittsburgh. In game 1, the Penguins won 6–3. However, in game 2, Montreal stormed back victorious by a score of 3–1. Games 3 & 4 shifted to Montreal. Game 3 was in the Penguins' favor 2–0. The 2–1 series lead for the Penguins would be short lived as Montreal won game 4 3–2. Game 5 went back to Pittsburgh where the Penguins won 2–1. Unfortunately, in game 6, Montreal would win at home 4–3. Back in Pittsburgh, Montreal won game 7 5-2 and won the series 4–3.

=== Playoff log ===
2010 Stanley Cup playoffs
Eastern Conference quarterfinals vs No. 5 Ottawa Senators: 4–2 (Home: 1–2; Road: 3–0)

#	Date	Visitor	Score	Home	OT	PIT goals	OTT goals	Decision	Attendance	Series	Recap
1	April 14	Ottawa	5–4	Pittsburgh		Malkin, Malkin, Adams, Goligoski	Regin, Neil, Kelly, Karlsson, Ruutu	Fleury (0–1)	17,132	0–1	
2	April 16	Ottawa	1–2	Pittsburgh		Crosby, Letang	Regin	Fleury (1–1)	17,132	1–1	
3	April 18	Pittsburgh	4–2	Ottawa		Ponikarovsky, Malkin, Crosby, Guerin	Fisher, Cullen	Fleury (2–1)	20,119	2–1	
4	April 20	Pittsburgh	7–4	Ottawa		Malkin, Crosby, Cooke, Crosby, Talbot, Kunitz, Staal	Neil, Alfredsson, Cullen, Spezza	Fleury (3–1)	20,014	3–1	
5	April 22	Ottawa	4–3	Pittsburgh	3OT	Letang, Kunitz, Crosby	Fisher, Ruutu, Regin, Carkner (3OT)	Fleury (3–2)	17,132	3–2	
6	April 24	Pittsburgh	4–3	Ottawa	OT	Cooke, Guerin, Cooke, Dupuis (OT)	Cullen, Neil, Alfredsson	Fleury (4–2)	20,122	4–2	

Eastern Conference semifinals vs No. 8 Montreal Canadiens: 3–4 (Home: 2–2; Road: 1–2)

#	Date	Visitor	Score	Home	OT	PIT goals	MON goals	Decision	Attendance	Series	Recap
1	April 30	Montreal	3–6	Pittsburgh		Gonchar, Staal, Letang, Adams, Goligoski, Guerin	Subban, Cammalleri, Gionta	Fleury (5–2)	17,132	1–0	
2	May 2	Montreal	3–1	Pittsburgh		Cooke	Gionta, Cammalleri, Cammalleri	Fleury (5–3)	17,132	1–1	
3	May 4	Pittsburgh	2–0	Montreal		Malkin, Dupuis		Fleury (6–3)	21,273	2–1	
4	May 6	Pittsburgh	2–3	Montreal		Talbot, Kunitz	Pyatt, Lapierre, Gionta	Fleury (6–4)	21,273	2–2	
5	May 8	Montreal	1–2	Pittsburgh		Letang, Gonchar	Cammalleri	Fleury (7–4)	17,132	3–2	
6	May 10	Pittsburgh	3–4	Montreal		Crosby, Letang, Guerin	Cammalleri, Cammalleri, Spacek, Lapierre	Fleury (7–5)	21,273	3–3	
7	May 12	Montreal	5–2	Pittsburgh		Kunitz, Staal	Gionta, Moore, Cammalleri, Moen, Gionta	Fleury (7–6)	17,132	3–4	

Legend: = Win = Loss = OT/SO Loss = Playoff series win

- Scorer of game-winning goal in italics.

== Player statistics ==
Skaters

Regular season
Player	GP	G	A	Pts	+/−	PIM
Sidney Crosby	81	51	58	109	15	71
Evgeni Malkin	67	28	49	77	-6	100
Sergei Gonchar	62	11	39	50	-4	49
Jordan Staal	82	21	28	49	19	57
Bill Guerin	78	21	24	45	-9	75
Pascal Dupuis	81	18	20	38	5	16
Alex Goligoski	69	8	29	37	7	22
Chris Kunitz	50	13	19	32	3	39
Matt Cooke	79	15	15	30	17	106
Ruslan Fedotenko	80	11	19	30	-17	50
Kris Letang	73	3	24	27	1	51
Tyler Kennedy	64	13	12	25	10	31
Brooks Orpik	73	2	23	25	6	64
Mike Rupp	81	13	6	19	5	120
Mark Eaton	79	3	13	16	5	26
Jay McKee	62	1	9	10	6	54
Craig Adams	82	0	10	10	-5	72
Alexei Ponikarovsky^{†}	16	2	7	9	-6	17
Jordan Leopold^{†}	20	4	4	8	5	6
Martin Skoula^{‡}	33	3	5	8	-4	6
Max Talbot	45	2	5	7	-9	30
Chris Conner	8	2	1	3	-1	0
Eric Godard	45	1	2	3	2	76
Chris Bourque^{‡}	20	0	3	3	-4	10
Ben Lovejoy	12	0	3	3	8	2
Nick Johnson	6	1	1	2	-2	2
Luca Caputi^{‡}	4	1	1	2	-1	2
Deryk Engelland	9	0	2	2	-2	17
Mark Letestu	10	1	0	1	-2	2
Nate Guenin	2	0	0	0	-2	0
Tim Wallace	1	0	0	0	0	0
Eric Tangradi	1	0	0	0	0	0
Dustin Jeffrey	1	0	0	0	0	0
Total		249	431	680	—	1,173

Playoffs
Player	GP	G	A	Pts	+/−	PIM
Sidney Crosby	13	6	13	19	6	6
Sergei Gonchar	13	2	10	12	4	4
Evgeni Malkin	13	5	6	11	0	6
Chris Kunitz	13	4	7	11	3	8
Bill Guerin	11	4	5	9	3	2
Alex Goligoski	13	2	7	9	4	2
Pascal Dupuis	13	2	6	8	5	4
Kris Letang	13	5	2	7	-5	6
Matt Cooke	13	4	2	6	-4	22
Max Talbot	13	2	4	6	1	11
Jordan Staal	11	3	2	5	-4	6
Alexei Ponikarovsky	11	1	4	5	0	4
Craig Adams	13	2	1	3	2	15
Mark Eaton	13	0	3	3	-4	4
Brooks Orpik	13	0	2	2	3	12
Mark Letestu	4	0	1	1	0	0
Jay McKee	5	0	0	0	2	2
Mike Rupp	11	0	0	0	0	8
Jordan Leopold	8	0	0	0	-2	2
Ruslan Fedotenko	6	0	0	0	-3	4
Tyler Kennedy	10	0	0	0	-6	2
Chris Conner	1	0	0	0	0	0
Total		42	75	117	—	130

Goaltenders

Regular season
Player	GP	GS	TOI	W	L	OT	GA	GAA	SA	SV%	SO	G	A	PIM
Marc-Andre Fleury	67	66	3798:17	37	21	6	168	2.65	1772	0.905	1	0	1	10
Brent Johnson	23	15	1108:08	10	6	1	51	2.76	541	0.906	0	0	1	0
Alexander Pechurskiy	1	0	35:31	0	0	0	1	1.69	13	0.923	0	0	0	0
John Curry	1	1	24:29	0	1	0	5	12.25	14	0.643	0	0	0	0
Total		82	4966:25	47	28	7	225	2.72	2340	0.904	1	0	2	10

Playoffs
Player	GP	GS	TOI	W	L	OT	GA	GAA	SA	SV%	SO	G	A	PIM
Marc-Andre Fleury	13	13	798:12	7	6	--	37	2.78	339	0.891	1	0	0	2
Brent Johnson	1	0	31:29	0	0	--	1	1.91	7	0.857	0	0	0	0
Total		13	829:41	7	6	0	38	2.75	346	0.890	1	0	0	2

^{†}Denotes player spent time with another team before joining the Penguins. Stats reflect time with the Penguins only.
^{‡}Denotes player was traded mid-season. Stats reflect time with the Penguins only.

== Transactions ==
The Penguins have been involved in the following transactions during the 2009–10 season.

=== Trades ===
February 11, 2010	To St. Louis Blues Nate Guenin	To Pittsburgh Penguins Steve Wagner
March 1, 2010	To Florida Panthers 2nd-round pick in 2010	To Pittsburgh Penguins Jordan Leopold
March 2, 2010	To Toronto Maple Leafs Luca Caputi; Martin Skoula	To Pittsburgh Penguins Alexei Ponikarovsky
March 3, 2010	To Toronto Maple Leafs Chris Peluso	To Pittsburgh Penguins 6th-round pick in 2010
May 28, 2010	To Anaheim Ducks 6th-round pick in 2010	To Pittsburgh Penguins Mattias Modig

=== Free agents acquired ===
Player	Former team	Contract terms
Mike Rupp	New Jersey Devils	2 years, $1.65 million
Nate Guenin	Philadelphia Flyers	1 year, $500,000
Chris Conner	Dallas Stars	1 year, $500,000
Chris Lee	Bridgeport Sound Tigers	1 year, $500,000
Jay McKee	St. Louis Blues	1 year, $800,000
Brent Johnson	Washington Capitals	1 year, $525,000
Wade Brookbank	Carolina Hurricanes	1 year, $500,000
Wyatt Smith	San Antonio Rampage	1 year, $500,000
Ryan Bayda	Carolina Hurricanes	1 year, $500,000
Martin Skoula	Minnesota Wild	1 year, $575,000

=== Free agents lost ===
Player	New team	Contract terms
Hal Gill	Montreal Canadiens	2 years, $4.5 million
Mathieu Garon	Columbus Blue Jackets	2 years, $2.4 million
Rob Scuderi	Los Angeles Kings	4 years, $13.6 million
Jeff Taffe	Florida Panthers	2 years, $1.2 million
Chris Minard	Edmonton Oilers	1 year, $550,000
Petr Sykora	Minnesota Wild	1 year, $1.6 million
Miroslav Satan	Boston Bruins	1 year, $700,000

=== Claimed from waivers ===
Date	Player	Previous team
September 30, 2009	Chris Bourque	Washington Capitals

=== Lost from waivers ===
Date	Player	New team
September 30, 2009	Paul Bissonnette	Phoenix Coyotes
December 5, 2009	Chris Bourque	Washington Capitals

== Notable achievements ==
=== Awards ===
Regular season
Player	Award	Awarded
Sidney Crosby	NHL First Star of the Week	November 30, 2009
Marc-Andre Fleury	NHL Second Star of the Week	December 21, 2009
Sidney Crosby	NHL Third Star of the Week	January 25, 2010
Sidney Crosby	Maurice "Rocket" Richard Trophy (co-winner with Steven Stamkos)	April 11, 2010
Sidney Crosby	NHL First Star of the Week	April 12, 2010
Sidney Crosby	Mark Messier Leadership Award	June 23, 2010

=== Team awards ===
Player	Award	Notes
Sidney Crosby; Marc-Andre Fleury	Baz Bastien Memorial Award	Presented by the Pittsburgh Chapter of the Professional Hockey Writers Association to the player who the local media of the PHWA want to acknowledge for his cooperation throughout the year. The award is presented in memory of the late Aldege "Baz" Bastien, Penguins general manager from 1976 to 1983. Sponsor: UPMC Sports Medicine
Bill Guerin	Bill Masterton Memorial Trophy nominee	The Pittsburgh Chapter of the Professional Hockey Writers Association votes for the Penguins' Masterton nominee. Each NHL team selects a Masterton candidate from which the overall winner is chosen. The Masterton candidate is nominated as the player who best exemplifies the qualities of perseverance, sportsmanship and dedication to hockey. Sponsor: Trib Total Media
Sidney Crosby	A. T. Caggiano Memorial Booster Club Cup	Presented in memory of A.T. Caggiano, long-time Penguins' locker room attendant & Booster Club supporter, the award is presented by Penguins Booster Club members, who vote for the three stars after every home game and tally votes at the end of the regular season.
Jordan Staal	Player's Player Award	The players hold a vote at the end of the season for the player they feel exemplifies leadership for the team, both on and off the ice, a player dedicated to teamwork. Sponsor: Highmark Blue Cross Blue Shield
Sidney Crosby	Edward J. DeBartolo Award	The award recognizes the player who has donated a tremendous amount of time and effort during the season working on community and charity projects. Sponsor: Verizon Wireless
Brooks Orpik	Defensive Player of the Year	This award honors the defensive skills of an individual player on the team. Sponsor: PNC Wealth Management
Sidney Crosby	Most Valuable Player	Based on the overall contribution the player makes to the team. Sponsor: CONSOL Energy

=== Milestones ===
Regular season
Player	Milestone	Reached
Sidney Crosby	400th NHL Point	October 3, 2009
Matt Cooke	100th NHL Goal	October 10, 2009
Deryk Engelland	1st NHL Game	November 10, 2009
Pascal Dupuis	100th NHL Goal	November 14, 2009
Mark Letestu	1st NHL Game	November 14, 2009
Jay McKee	100th NHL Assist	December 15, 2009
Alexander Pechurskiy	1st NHL game	January 16, 2010
Nick Johnson	1st NHL Game; 1st NHL Goal	January 21, 2010
Mark Letestu	1st NHL Goal	February 1, 2010
Sidney Crosby	300th NHL Assist	February 6, 2010
Sergei Gonchar	200th NHL Goal	March 2, 2010
Chris Kunitz	100th NHL Goal	March 22, 2010
Sidney Crosby	500th NHL Point	April 8, 2010
Eric Tangradi	1st NHL Game	April 11, 2010

== Draft picks ==
The 2009 NHL entry draft was the 47th NHL entry draft. It was held June 26–27 at the Bell Centre in Montreal, Quebec, the first NHL draft to be held in Montreal since 1992. At the Entry Draft, the Penguins made two trades to increase their number of overall picks, as several of their picks had been traded previously. With their first-round pick, the Penguins chose Simon Despres, 30th overall.

Round	Pick #	Player	Position	Nationality	College/junior/club team (league)
1	30	Simon Despres	D	Canada	Saint John Sea Dogs (QMJHL)
2	61	Philip Samuelsson	D	Canada	Chicago Steel (USHL)
3	63^{[a]}	Ben Hanowski	RW	United States	Little Falls High School (USHS-MN)
4	121	Nick Petersen	RW	Canada	Shawinigan Cataractes (QMJHL)
5	123^{[b]}	Alex Velischek	D	Canada	Delbarton School (USHS-NJ)
5	151^{[c]}	Andy Bathgate	C	Canada	Belleville Bulls (OHL)
6	181	Viktor Ekbom	D	Sweden	IK Oskarshamn (HockeyAllsvenskan)

Notes on draft picks

- ^{a} The Tampa Bay Lightning's third-round pick went to the Penguins as the result of a trade on June 28, 2008, that sent Gary Roberts and Ryan Malone to Tampa Bay in exchange for this pick (being conditional at the time of the trade). The condition – Ryan Malone is signed by Tampa Bay prior to the 2008–09 season – was converted on June 29, 2008.
- ^{b} The Tampa Bay Lightning's fifth-round pick went to the Penguins as the result of a trade on October 1, 2008, that sent Michal Sersen to Tampa Bay for this pick.
- ^{c} The Penguins' fifth-round pick (151st overall) was traded to the Toronto Maple Leafs on February 26, 2008, along with a second-round pick in 2008 in exchange for Hal Gill. The New York Rangers then acquired the pick from the Maple Leafs in July 2008, then the Penguins re-claimed their pick in a June 2009 trade that sent Chad Johnson to the Rangers.
- The Penguins' third-round pick was traded to the New York Islanders as a result of the conditional trade in which the Penguins acquired Bill Guerin on March 4, 2009. The trade sent the New York Islanders a conditional 2009 draft pick that became the third-round pick, because the Penguins advanced beyond the first round in the 2009 playoffs.
