= 2009–10 Philadelphia Flyers season =

NHL hockey team season

2009–10 Philadelphia Flyers
- Eastern Conference champions
- Division: 3rd Atlantic
- Conference: 7th Eastern
- 2009–10 record: 41–35–6
- Home record: 24–14–3
- Road record: 17–21–3
- Goals for: 236
- Goals against: 225

Team information
- General manager: Paul Holmgren
- Coach: John Stevens (Oct.–Dec.); Peter Laviolette (Dec.–Jun.)
- Captain: Mike Richards
- Alternate captains: Jeff Carter; Simon Gagne; Chris Pronger; Kimmo Timonen
- Arena: Wachovia Center
- Average attendance: 19,535 (100.2%)
- Minor league affiliates: Adirondack Phantoms; Kalamazoo Wings; Quad City Mallards

Team leaders
- Goals: Jeff Carter (33)
- Assists: Chris Pronger (45)
- Points: Mike Richards (62)
- Penalty minutes: Daniel Carcillo (207)
- Plus/minus: Chris Pronger (+22)
- Wins: Ray Emery; Michael Leighton (16)
- Goals against average: Michael Leighton (2.48)

The 2009–10 Philadelphia Flyers season was the franchise's 43rd season for the National Hockey League (NHL) franchise that was established on June 5, 1967.

The Flyers began the 2009–10 season with some major changes, allowing goaltenders Martin Biron and Antero Niittymaki to depart via free agency, replacing them with former Ottawa Senators netminder Ray Emery and former Flyer Brian Boucher, and significantly upgrading the defense with the addition of Chris Pronger from the Anaheim Ducks. Pronger came at a price, costing the Flyers Joffrey Lupul, Luca Sbisa, and the Flyers' first round draft picks in 2009 and 2010. The season began in earnest but soon began to unravel with mediocre play that cost John Stevens his job in December. Peter Laviolette was hired as head coach in order to re-institute accountability and restore success to the Flyers but the results were not immediate, as the Flyers suffered a 2–7–1 stretch after his arrival. This was corrected with an 18–7–1 stretch in the middle of the season. Injuries took a major toll on the Flyers, with Blair Betts, Danny Briere, Jeff Carter, Simon Gagne and Kimmo Timonen missing significant numbers of games, but no position was nearly affected as much with injuries as goaltending with Emery suffering a career-threatening injury. Mediocre play down the stretch forced the Flyers into a do-or-die shootout with the New York Rangers in the last game of the regular season for a playoff berth. Boucher stopped final shooter Olli Jokinen to clinch the seventh seed in the East and a first round match-up with the New Jersey Devils.

In the first round of the playoffs, Boucher and the Flyers consistently outplayed Martin Brodeur and New Jersey and pulled off the upset in five games. However, the victory was costly as Carter suffered a broken foot, Gagne a broken toe in Game 4, and Ian Laperriere suffered a fractured orbital bone by blocking a shot in Game 5. The Flyers faced the sixth-seeded Boston Bruins in the second round, and despite playing at an even level with Boston, the Flyers found themselves in a 3–0 series deficit. Gagne returned from injury in Game 4, scoring the game-winning goal in overtime. The Flyers shut out the Bruins 4–0 in Game 5, despite losing goaltender Boucher to injury. A 2–1 Flyers win in Game 6 forced a Game 7 in Boston. Falling behind 3–0 in Game 7, the Flyers pulled off the biggest comeback in franchise history, winning 4–3 on a late goal by Gagne to join the 1942 Toronto Maple Leafs, 1975 New York Islanders and the 2004 Boston Red Sox as the only sports teams to win a playoff series after trailing 3–0. Not only did they overcome a 3–0 series deficit, they also overcame a 3–0 goal deficit in Game 7.

In the Eastern Conference finals, the Flyers had home-ice advantage as they faced the eighth-seeded Montreal Canadiens. Michael Leighton became the first Flyers netminder to record three shutouts in a series, and Jeff Carter and Ian Laperriere returned to the lineup as the Flyers won the Eastern Conference Championship in five games and advanced to the Stanley Cup Final for the first time since 1997; the Chicago Blackhawks were their opponents. Patrick Kane scored just over four minutes into overtime in Game 6 to eliminate the Flyers and give Chicago their first Stanley Cup since 1961. Ville Leino, acquired in a mid-season trade from the Detroit Red Wings, set the Flyers rookie playoff scoring record and tied the NHL record with 21 points.

== Off-season ==
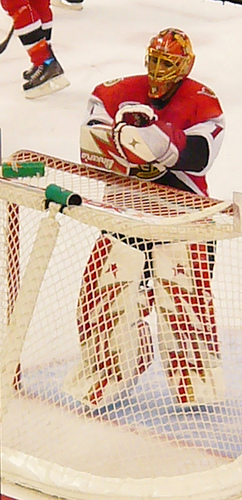
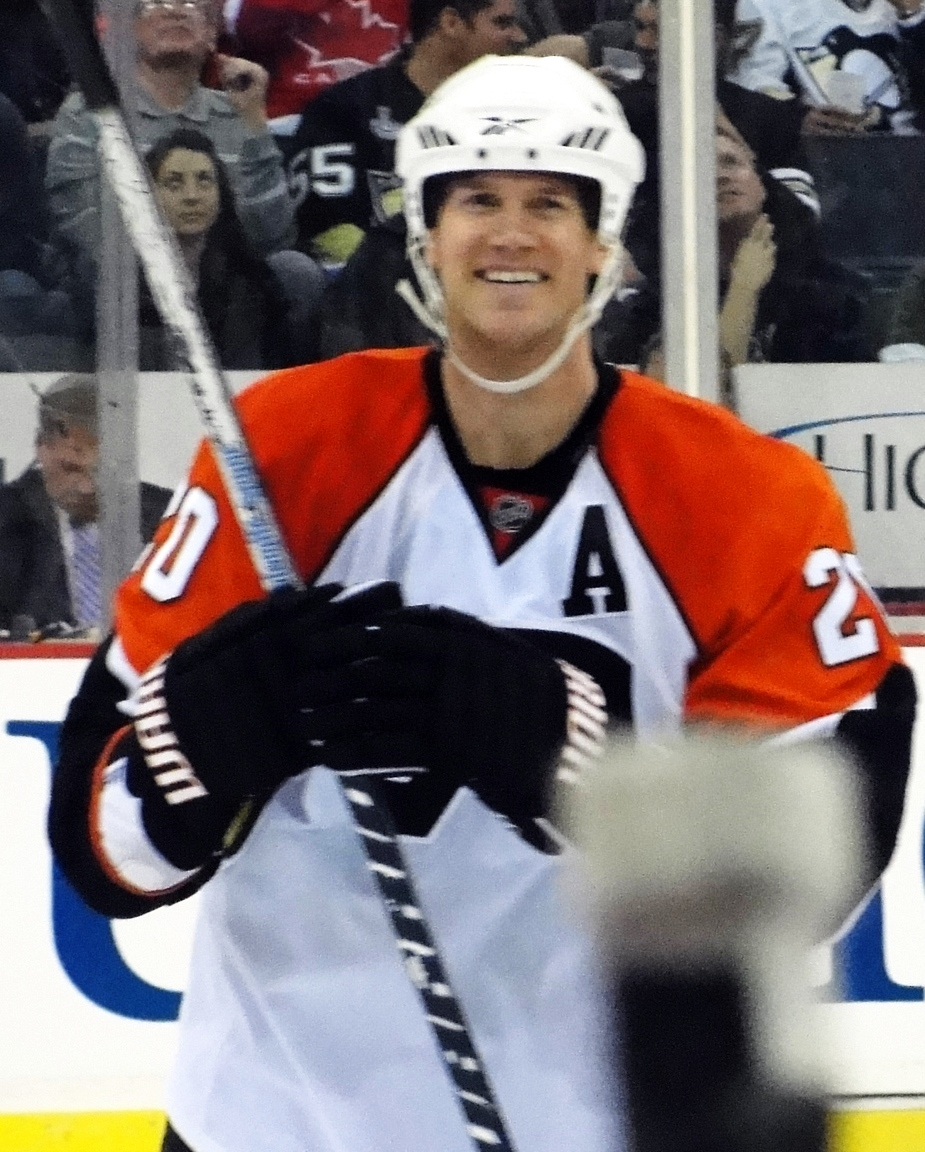
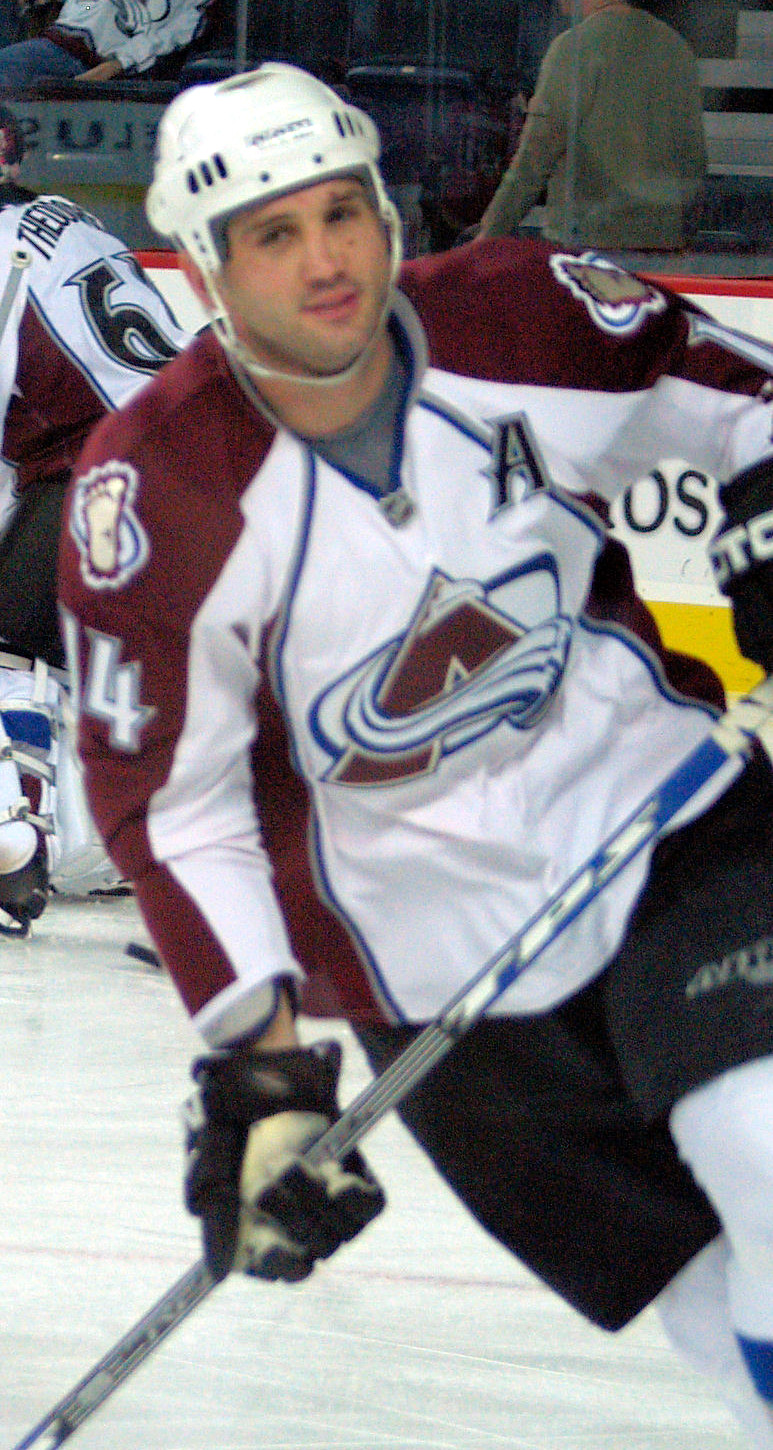
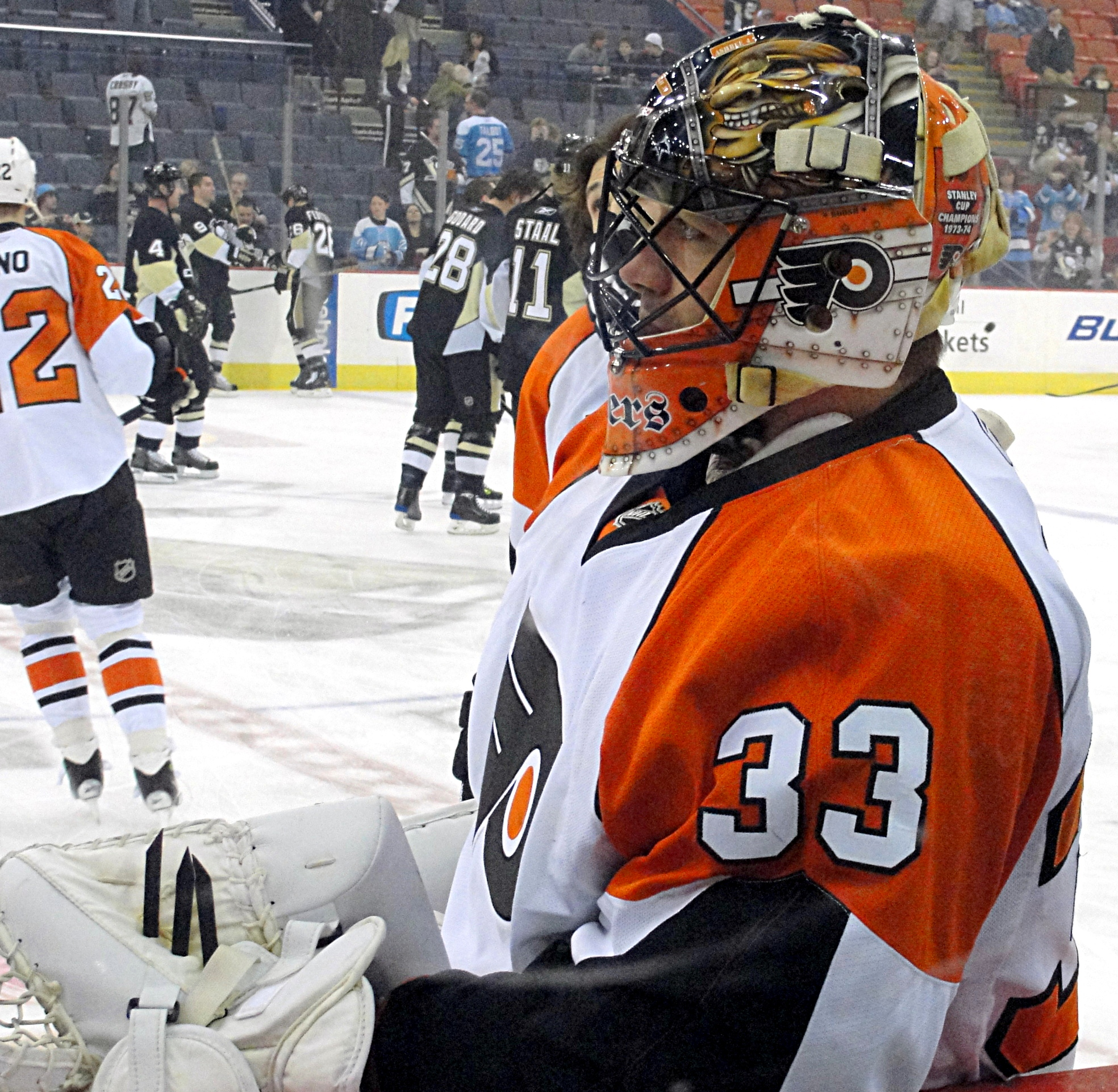
Off-season acquisitions. Clockwise from upper left: Ray Emery, Chris Pronger, Brian Boucher and Ian Laperriere.

The Flyers began preparing for the season by signing controversial goalie Ray Emery prior to the official start of free agency. Emery, who had spent the previous season in the Russian Kontinental Hockey League (KHL), signed a one-year contract worth US$1.5 million. Former Flyer Brian Boucher was signed to a two-year contract on the first day of free agency to serve as Emery's backup. As a result, the team's goaltending tandem of the past two seasons, starter Martin Biron and backup Antero Niittymaki, signed with the New York Islanders and Tampa Bay Lightning, respectively, as unrestricted free agents. The Flyers also signed right winger Ian Laperriere to a three-year contract and lost Mike Knuble as a free agent to the Washington Capitals.

Longtime defenseman Derian Hatcher also retired at the beginning of the off-season (after missing all of last season due to knee surgery), replacing Eric Desjardins as the team's player development coach. Desjardins stepped down due to personal business interests. Other staff changes included the Flyers hiring Jeff Reese as their new goalie coach to replace Reggie Lemelin and promoting former Phantoms coach John Paddock to assistant general manager.

At the entry draft, the Flyers made a blockbuster trade for Anaheim Ducks' defenseman Chris Pronger, a former Hart Trophy winner as league MVP and Norris Trophy winner as the league's best defenseman. Along with Pronger, the Flyers also received minor league forward Ryan Dingle in exchange for winger Joffrey Lupul, defenseman Luca Sbisa, first-round picks in 2009 and 2010 and a conditional third-round pick. They quickly signed Pronger to a seven-year contract extension worth approximately $34 million. Nearly a month after signing, the NHL announced they had launched an investigation on Pronger's deal to determine whether it was a circumvention of the salary cap under the collective bargaining agreement. Because the contract is front-loaded, with annual salaries of just $525,000 in the final two years, and expires by the time Pronger is 42, the investigation was launched with the focus on the potential of negotiations between Pronger and the Flyers to retire before contract expiration. However, as Pronger's contract took effect after his 35th birthday, under the terms of the current collective bargaining agreement, his over-35 contract could not be deleted from the Flyers' cap space unless he is placed on long-term injured reserve, and even then it would come back on the team's cap space during the offseason.

== Regular season ==
The 2009–10 season started for the Flyers with the successful return of Ray Emery to the NHL, shutting out the Carolina Hurricanes. However, what followed was inconsistent play of the entire team throughout October though a successful record could be maintained. The last game in October started a five-game winning streak. However, this effort would be largely in vain as a road trip to the west coast and ensuing games at the end of the month saw the Flyers lose six of seven games. After being shut out by the Atlanta Thrashers and Vancouver Canucks in consecutive games, general manager Paul Holmgren relieved Head Coach John Stevens from his duties and hired Peter Laviolette in his stead.

The change behind the bench however only showed little immediate impact. The very first game for Laviolette saw his team being dominated by the Washington Capitals and Daniel Carcillo punching out Matt Bradley, for which Carcillo would be suspended for four games. Up until Christmas break the team showed little improvement with a 2–7–1 stretch from Laviolettes installation on December 4 to December 21.

The team was also marred with injuries up until that point. Simon Gagne had to have hernia surgery and was sidelined for two months. Blair Betts suffered a separated shoulder in early October and reinjured the shoulder a few games after his return in mid-November. Danny Briere suffered a tweaked groin and also missed time due to a suspension and the flu. The team also played hurt a lot. James van Riemsdyk suffered an injury to his pinky finger after being hit with a puck but did not miss any games for it. Ian Laperriere, on the other hand, was hit in the mouth with the puck on November 27 and would lose seven teeth but only miss one period of play. Defenseman Kimmo Timonen also suffered a broken toe.

The worst injury, however, was to goaltender Ray Emery, who suffered an abdominal tear and went out of the line-up in early December. A short return came in late January but Emery re-injured and had to undergo hip-surgery ending his season in early March. After continuing the slump with Boucher in net, the Flyers picked up Michael Leighton from re-entry waivers, who had fallen out of favor with the Carolina Hurricanes with a goals against average (GAA) above 4.00 and a save percentage below .850. However, Leighton would turn his season around with the Flyers with an 8–0–1 record in ten consecutive starts after he had been picked up. His season too would end early with a 16–5–2 record after suffering a high ankle sprain in a game against Nashville on March 16.

An early season highlight was November 16, when Dave Schultz was inducted in the Flyers Hall of Fame. Another honor was given to James van Riemsdyk, who was awarded Rookie of the Month for November 2009 by the NHL. Throughout December, five Flyers were selected for the roster of their home country in the 2010 Winter Olympics. Mike Richards and Chris Pronger were picked for Canada and Kimmo Timonen was selected for Finland, while Oskars Bartulis and Ole-Kristian Tollefsen were chosen by Latvia and Norway, respectively, though Tollefsen would be traded to Detroit before the Olympics began. Jeff Carter was later considered by Team Canada to join the squad in the event that Ryan Getzlaf is unable to play. However, Getzlaf did participate in the tournament and Carter did not. Richards and Pronger would earn gold medals with Canada while Timonen gained a bronze medal with Finland.

The Flyers also played in the 2010 Winter Classic in Fenway Park against the Boston Bruins. Though they held the lead up until the last three minutes of the game, they would ultimately lose in overtime to a goal that had been contested by the Flyers as it appeared that the Bruins had too many men on the ice.

Another controversy struck over a shorthanded goal by Simon Gagne in a 7–4 win against the Pittsburgh Penguins on January 7. The goal had not been given and, after video review, was not awarded, though video evidence shows the puck in the net. However, this angle had not been sent to the video review in Toronto by the FSN Pittsburgh broadcasting team and the call could no longer be overturned after the puck had been dropped. An internal investigation by FSN Pittsburgh as well as an investigation by the NHL followed and a producer, the son of former NHL player Lowell MacDonald, was suspended.

For the first time since 1993, the Flyers stayed put during the 2010 NHL trade deadline period with no trades. With only minor changes throughout the season, the team finished almost entirely unchanged from the way it started the season in terms of players. Only the waiver acquisition of Michael Leighton, the season-ending injury to Emery and the trade of Ole-Kristian Tollefsen for Ville Leino showed significant impact to the roster, besides usual promotions and demotions to or from the Flyers' AHL affiliate, the Adirondack Phantoms.

Another key injury knocked Jeff Carter out for five games as a fracture in his left foot halted his streak of consecutive games played at 286. He returned for the last two games of the season.

The Flyers season ended in a dramatic fashion. Wins over the Detroit Red Wings and the Toronto Maple Leafs kept the playoff hopes alive, it came down to a home-and-home series with the New York Rangers to end the season. The Rangers were trying to clinch a playoff spot themselves and needed to win both games to do so. The Flyers lost the first game of that series at Madison Square Garden 4–3, though it was a hard-fought battle for both teams. This set up a "Win and you're in" situation for the second game at the Wachovia Center, with the winner advancing to the playoffs and the loser being eliminated. Jody Shelley scored early for the Rangers but New York could not extend that lead. The Flyers put continuous pressure on the Rangers with Henrik Lundqvist playing a stellar game to keep the Flyers off the board until Matt Carle put a rebound behind him halfway through the third period tying the game 1–1. Neither team scored again until the shootout, in which a goal by Claude Giroux forced Olli Jokinen to score to keep the Rangers playoff hopes alive. However, Brian Boucher made the crucial save and with that clinching the playoff spot for the Flyers and ending the Rangers' season.

=== Divisional standings ===
Atlantic Division
		GP	W	L	OTL	GF	GA	Pts
**1**	**New Jersey Devils**	**82**	**48**	**27**	**7**	**222**	**191**	**103**
**2**	**Pittsburgh Penguins**	**82**	**47**	**28**	**7**	**257**	**237**	**101**
**3**	**Philadelphia Flyers**	**82**	**41**	**35**	**6**	**236**	**225**	**88**
4	New York Rangers	82	38	33	11	222	218	87
5	New York Islanders	82	34	37	11	222	264	79

=== Conference standings ===
Eastern Conference
R		Div	GP	W	L	OTL	GF	GA	Pts
**1**	**p – Washington Capitals**	**SE**	**82**	**54**	**15**	**13**	**318**	**233**	121
**2**	**y – New Jersey Devils**	**AT**	**82**	**48**	**27**	**7**	**222**	**191**	103
**3**	**y – Buffalo Sabres**	**NE**	**82**	**45**	**27**	**10**	**235**	**207**	100
**4**	**Pittsburgh Penguins**	**AT**	**82**	**47**	**28**	**7**	**257**	**237**	101
**5**	**Ottawa Senators**	**NE**	**82**	**44**	**32**	**6**	**225**	**238**	94
**6**	**Boston Bruins**	**NE**	**82**	**39**	**30**	**13**	**206**	**200**	91
**7**	**Philadelphia Flyers**	**AT**	**82**	**41**	**35**	**6**	**236**	**225**	88
**8**	**Montreal Canadiens**	**NE**	**82**	**39**	**33**	**10**	**217**	**223**	88
8.5
9	New York Rangers	AT	82	38	33	11	222	218	87
10	Atlanta Thrashers	SE	82	35	34	13	234	256	83
11	Carolina Hurricanes	SE	82	35	37	10	230	256	80
12	Tampa Bay Lightning	SE	82	34	36	12	217	260	80
13	New York Islanders	AT	82	34	37	11	222	264	79
14	Florida Panthers	SE	82	32	37	13	208	244	77
15	Toronto Maple Leafs	NE	82	30	38	14	214	267	74

bold – Qualified for playoffs; y – Won division; p – Won Presidents' Trophy (and division)

AT – Atlantic Division, NE – Northeast Division, SE – Southeast Division

== Playoffs ==
=== Eastern Conference quarterfinals ===
The Flyers drew their division rival New Jersey Devils for the opening round of the playoffs as the Devils clinched second place in the conference by defeating the Buffalo Sabres in their final game of the season. Buffalo would have been the Flyers' opponents had the Sabres managed to keep the Devils without a point from that game. The Flyers won five of six games against the Devils during the regular season. The Devils managed to secure the second seed going into the playoffs, thus guaranteeing them the home-ice advantage in the first round against the Flyers and potentially the second round if they get there.

As the season series promised, the Flyers matched up well with the Devils and took Game 1 in a 2–1 decision at Prudential Center. The Flyers had shut out the Devils until there were only three minutes remaining in the game but could hold on to the lead to finish out the game. An equally hard-fought game was the second in the series which the Devils took in a 5–3 victory. With a split in New Jersey, the series turned to Philadelphia.

Game 3 saw an unlikely hero in Daniel Carcillo, who scored the 3–2 game winner 3:35 into overtime giving him his second point of the night in 7:11 of ice-time. He assisted on a goal by Mike Richards in the second period. Game 4 at Wachovia Center saw the Flyers win the game 4–1 on a three-point night by Jeff Carter, who played with a screw inserted in his broken foot. However, that win would prove costly, as Carter broke his other foot on the play for his second goal and Simon Gagne suffered a broken big toe in his right foot.

This would set up situation similar to the 2000 Eastern Conference finals, in which the Flyers, on the strong play of Brian Boucher, took a 3–1 series lead over the Devils, only to see it melt away and lose in seven games. However, history would not repeat itself. Boucher would earn his first playoff shutout in 10 years in a 3–0 decision in Game 5, eliminating the Devils. This was the third consecutive time the Devils would exit the playoffs in the first round. Claude Giroux contributed to all three goals, assisting Danny Briere on a goal in the first period and scoring twice himself in the second. That win saw another injury though, as Ian Laperriere was hit in the face by a slapshot in a situation reminiscent of an incident earlier in the season, which cost him seven teeth. Laperriere was hit above the right eye and suffered a large gash across his eyebrow which reportedly required 50–70 stitches.

The series was influenced strongly by the play of Mike Richards, who had four multi-point games in the series that lasted five games. However, the series was also marred with a large number of obstruction penalties called. In five games, there were 72 minor penalties and three game misconducts handed out for a total of 174 penalty minutes between both teams.

=== Eastern Conference semifinals ===
The Flyers would meet the Boston Bruins in the next round, who had dispatched the Buffalo Sabres in six games. The Bruins were noted in that series for being perfect on the penalty kill, negating all 19 chances the Sabres had in that series. However, due to the Flyers having started on the first day of the playoffs and their beating of the Devils in quick fashion, the Flyers had more than a week off. While this would provide some opportunity for their injured players to heal, the Flyers were notorious for not responding well to long rests during the regular season. This would show during Game 1 in the series, as the Flyers gave up the first goal less than three minutes into the game and leave the first period down 2–0. However, the Flyers would rally and tie the game at 4–4 in the second half of the third period on goals by Mike Richards and Danny Briere. This, however, would only set up the heroics of Marc Savard, who had returned from missing several weeks with a concussion.

Game 2 was a similar story. The Bruins caught the early lead 5:12 into the game and while the Flyers were able to catch up twice, they could not take the lead and a goal by Milan Lucic with less than three minutes to go in the game would spell victory for the Bruins. In the third game, the Flyers were finally able to take a lead with Arron Asham scoring only 2:32 into the game. The lead would not last long though, as Blake Wheeler and Miroslav Satan would answer in quick succession, 1:34 apart and less than two minutes after Asham's goal, to take the lead. The Flyers were unable to score again and with a lackluster third period by Philadelphia, the game ended in a 4–1 Bruins victory. During the game Mike Richards broke the arm of bruins center David Krejci in a large open ice hit, knocking Krejci out for the rest of the series.

The Flyers were now on the brink of elimination down three games to none. However, on the upside, Simon Gagne returned for Game 4, which turned into a bizarre mirror version of the first game of the series. While the Flyers were able to take a big 3–1 lead, they saw it melt away on a few strange goals. The Flyers would retake the lead again, but Mark Recchi would tie it with 20 seconds left in the game. However, Gagne would put an end to it scoring at 14:40 in overtime to keep the Flyers alive and send the series back to Boston. There the Flyers would dominate, shutting out the Bruins for a 4–0 victory to climb back into the series. However, the shutout was not held by a single goalie, as Brian Boucher would go down with injuries in both of his knees after Flyers defenseman Ryan Parent and Bruins forward Miroslav Satan fell on top of him. This would call Michael Leighton back into action, who had only just returned at that very game from a high-ankle sprain that had sidelined him since mid-March.

Leighton's heroics would continue in Game 6 after making 14 saves in Game 5 to preserve the shutout Boucher had started. He would keep the Bruins off the scoreboard for 59 minutes until Milan Lucic scored and make 30 saves total. However, at that point, the Flyers would hold on to a 2–1 lead to send the series to a deciding Game 7 at TD Garden.

Game 7 would play out very much like the series itself. The Bruins would jump to a 3–0 lead in the first period, with two from Milan Lucic. Two of the goals came on the power play due to infractions for high-sticking on Scott Hartnell and Danny Briere, respectively. This would prompt head coach Peter Laviolette to use up his timeout to rally the team. Shortly after, James van Riemsdyk, who had not registered a goal in the playoffs until that point, scored to make it 3–1. The second period was all Flyers, as Hartnell and Briere would redeem themselves by scoring a goal each to tie the game up at 3–3. Overall, the game was relatively low on penalties, with only six minors being called total, but the last one of those, a bench penalty for too many men, would come to haunt Boston, as Simon Gagne put the puck in the net for a 4–3 Flyers lead. The Flyers would be able to hold on to it and become only the third team in NHL history, the fourth team in the big four American professional sports leagues, to return from an 0–3 deficit of games to win that playoff series.

=== Eastern Conference finals ===
The Flyers were matched up with the Montreal Canadiens in the Eastern Conference finals. This would be the first time the seventh and eighth seed would meet in a conference final. The Canadiens previously defeated the Presidents' Trophy winner Washington Capitals and the reigning Stanley Cup champions Pittsburgh Penguins, each in seven-game series, largely on the strong play of goaltender Jaroslav Halak. The Flyers and Canadiens split their season series 2–2.

However, despite being evenly matched during the season, the Flyers took advantage of their momentum and opened the series completely dominating the Canadiens in a 6–0 shutout despite being outshot 28–25. Six different Flyers scored goals in that game. While the Canadiens improved in Game 2, the story only repeated itself, as the Habs were shut-out again in a 3–0 decision.

With this, the series would go to Montreal, where the tables would quickly turn. The Flyers had an overall poor effort in a 5–1 loss, especially by their top defense pairing of Chris Pronger and Matt Carle, who were both -3. The game also ended somewhat controversially, as the last goal was scored by Montreal on a 5-on-3 power play and Montreal decided to put their top powerplay unit on the ice, despite less than a minute to play.

The Flyers reflected on their bad play and improved it. At the same time, Jeff Carter and Ian Laperriere, both missing at least ten games since the conference quarterfinals, would return to the line-up, providing reinforcements. Pronger and Carle bounced back and Claude Giroux had an outstanding night as the Flyers shut-out the Canadiens once again 3–0 in Game 4. This would make Michael Leighton the first Flyer goaltender to post three shutouts in one playoff series, tying an NHL record. The Flyers held the Canadiens to a single shot during the second period.

With their backs against the wall, the Canadiens found themselves in a situation which they had already played in five times that post-season, winning all of their elimination games. The team showed their desperation as they scored less than a minute into Game 5. However, Flyers captain Mike Richards would answer the bell with a shorthanded goal four minutes later. In the second period, the Flyers would take the lead on goals by Arron Asham and Jeff Carter, which they carried into the third. There, however, Scott Gomez would profit off a misplay and cut the lead to one. This would set up a dangerous situation which would worsen, as Chris Pronger was called on a double-minor for high sticking halfway through the period. The Flyers would, however, kill the penalty off and Jeff Carter, with the help of Mike Richards, scored into the empty net to seal the deal at 4–2 after the Canadiens had pulled their goalie.

This clinched the Flyers' first Stanley Cup Final berth since 1997 and the eighth in franchise history. It would also mark another run for the Cup for Chris Pronger, who returned to the Final for the third time since the NHL lockout, each time pushing a team that traded for him the previous off-season into the Final.

=== Stanley Cup Final ===
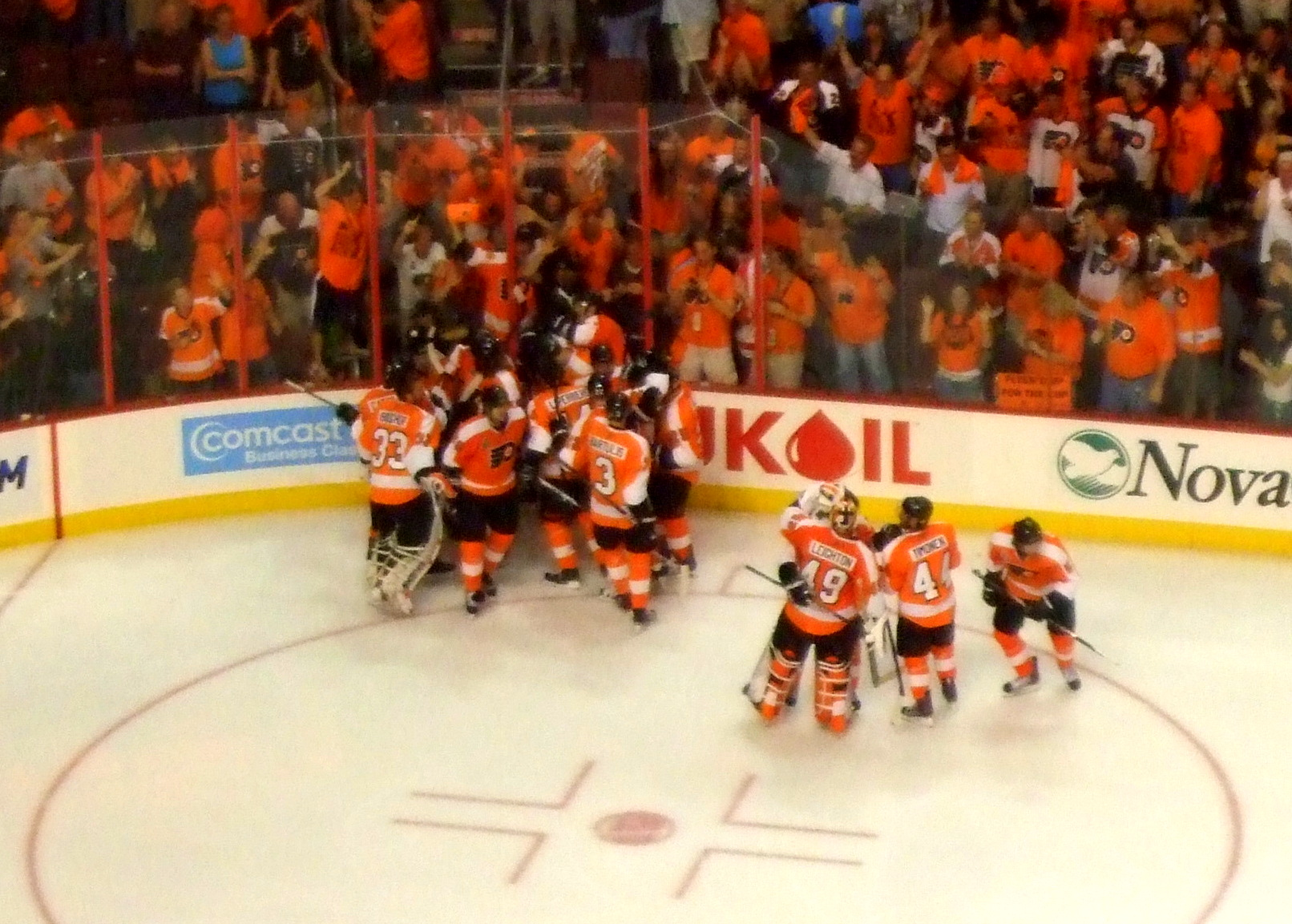
The Flyers celebrate Claude Giroux’s overtime goal in game 3 of the Stanley Cup Final. It was the first Cup Final game the Flyers had won since game 6 of the 1987 Stanley Cup Final.

The Flyers met the Chicago Blackhawks in the 2010 Stanley Cup Final. Chicago swept their Western Conference finals opponent San Jose Sharks 4–0 after dispatching the Nashville Predators and Vancouver Canucks in six games each. The only regular season meeting between the two teams ended dramatically, as Chris Pronger scored the deciding goal for the 3–2 victory of the Flyers with less than three seconds left in regulation.

In the finals, the Blackhawks defeated the Flyers in six games. Patrick Kane scoring the Game 6 overtime winning goal.

== Schedule and results ==
=== Preseason ===
2009 preseason
Preseason: 2–3–2 (home: 2–1–1; road: 0–2–1)

Game	Date	Score	Opponent	Decision	Attendance	Record	Recap
1	September 16	1–3	@ Detroit Red Wings	Emery	15,115	0–1–0	L
2^{[a]}	September 17	0–4	Toronto Maple Leafs	Boucher	9,090	0–2–0	L
3	September 19	4–5 (OT)	@ Toronto Maple Leafs	Boucher	18,609	0–2–1	OTL
4	September 22	5–2	Detroit Red Wings	Emery	18,055	1–2–1	W
5	September 24	2–1 (OT)	New Jersey Devils	Emery	17,650	2–2–1	W
6	September 26	0–1	@ New Jersey Devils	Boucher	11,167	2–3–1	L
7	September 29	4–5 (SO)	Minnesota Wild	Backlund	17,395	2–3–2	OTL
Notes:^{a} Game played at John Labatt Centre in London, Ontario.

Legend: W Win (2 points) L Loss (0 points) OTL Overtime/shootout loss (1 point)

=== Regular season ===
2009–10 regular season
October: 6–4–1, 13 points (home: 4–2–1; road: 2–2–0)

Game	Date	Score	Opponent	Decision	Attendance	Record	Points	Recap
1	October 2	2–0	@ Carolina Hurricanes	Emery	18,680	1–0–0	2	W
2	October 3	5–2	@ New Jersey Devils	Emery	17,625	2–0–0	4	W
3	October 6	6–5 OT	Washington Capitals	Emery	19,567	3–0–0	6	W
4	October 8	4–5	Pittsburgh Penguins	Emery	19,611	3–1–0	6	L
5	October 10	2–3 SO	Anaheim Ducks	Emery	19,603	3–1–1	7	OTL
6	October 16	2–4	@ Florida Panthers	Emery	15,557	3–2–1	7	L
7	October 22	4–3 SO	Boston Bruins	Emery	19,303	4–2–1	9	W
8	October 24	5–1	Florida Panthers	Emery	19,007	5–2–1	11	W
9	October 25	1–4	San Jose Sharks	Boucher	19,126	5–3–1	11	L
10	October 27	2–4	@ Washington Capitals	Emery	18,277	5–4–1	11	L
11	October 31	6–1	Carolina Hurricanes	Emery	19,076	6–4–1	13	W

November: 7–6–0, 14 points (home: 4–2–0; road: 3–4–0)

Game	Date	Score	Opponent	Decision	Attendance	Record	Points	Recap
12	November 2	6–2	Tampa Bay Lightning	Emery	18,667	7–4–1	15	W
13	November 6	5–2	@ Buffalo Sabres	Emery	18,525	8–4–1	17	W
14	November 7	2–1 SO	St. Louis Blues	Emery	19,542	9–4–1	19	W
15	November 12	5–1	Ottawa Senators	Emery	19,321	10–4–1	21	W
16	November 14	2–3	Buffalo Sabres	Emery	19,641	10–5–1	21	L
17	November 16	3–2	New Jersey Devils	Emery	19,673	11–5–1	23	W
18	November 18	3–2	@ Los Angeles Kings	Boucher	17,821	12–5–1	25	W
19	November 20	3–6	@ San Jose Sharks	Emery	17,562	12–6–1	25	L
20	November 21	1–3	@ Phoenix Coyotes	Emery	11,106	12–7–1	25	L
21	November 23	4–5	@ Colorado Avalanche	Boucher	13,281	12–8–1	25	L
22	November 25	2–1	@ New York Islanders	Boucher	12,687	13–8–1	27	W
23	November 27	2–4	Buffalo Sabres	Emery	19,673	13–9–1	27	L
24	November 28	0–1	@ Atlanta Thrashers	Boucher	16,018	13–10–1	27	L

December: 6–8–1, 13 points (home: 1–5–1; road: 5–3–0)

Game	Date	Score	Opponent	Decision	Attendance	Record	Points	Recap
25	December 3	0–3	Vancouver Canucks	Boucher	18,892	13–11–1	27	L
26	December 5	2–8	Washington Capitals	Emery	19,789	13–12–1	27	L
27	December 7	1–3	@ Montreal Canadiens	Boucher	21,273	13–13–1	27	L
28	December 8	6–2	New York Islanders	Boucher	19,330	14–13–1	29	W
29	December 10	0–2	Ottawa Senators	Boucher	19,706	14–14–1	29	L
30	December 12	1–4	@ New Jersey Devils	Boucher	15,724	14–15–1	29	L
31	December 14	3–1	@ Boston Bruins	Boucher	17,565	15–15–1	31	W
32	December 15	1–6	@ Pittsburgh Penguins	Boucher	17,086	15–16–1	31	L
33	December 17	2–3 SO	Pittsburgh Penguins	Boucher	19,689	15–16–2	32	OTL
34	December 19	1–2	New York Rangers	Boucher	19,637	15–17–2	32	L
35	December 21	1–4	Florida Panthers	Boucher	19,323	15–18–2	32	L
36	December 23	5–2	@ Tampa Bay Lightning	Leighton	16,177	16–18–2	34	W
37	December 26	4–3 SO	@ Carolina Hurricanes	Leighton	16,288	17–18–2	36	W
38	December 27	2–1	@ New York Islanders	Leighton	12,819	18–18–2	38	W
39	December 30	6–0	@ New York Rangers	Leighton	18,200	19–18–2	40	W

January: 8–5–1, 17 points (home: 7–2–0; road: 1–3–1)

Game	Date	Score	Opponent	Decision	Attendance	Record	Points	Recap
40^{[b]}	January 1	1–2 OT	@ Boston Bruins	Leighton	38,112	19–18–3	41	OTL
41	January 3	4–7	@ Ottawa Senators	Boucher	17,153	19–19–3	41	L
42	January 6	6–2	Toronto Maple Leafs	Leighton	19,617	20–19–3	43	W
43	January 7	7–4	@ Pittsburgh Penguins	Leighton	17,095	21–19–3	45	W
44	January 9	4–1	Tampa Bay Lightning	Leighton	19,678	22–19–3	47	W
45	January 12	6–3	Dallas Stars	Leighton	19,133	23–19–3	49	W
46	January 14	0–4	@ Toronto Maple Leafs	Leighton	19,370	23–20–3	49	L
47	January 17	3–5	@ Washington Capitals	Emery	18,277	23–21–3	49	L
48	January 19	5–3	Columbus Blue Jackets	Emery	19,126	24–21–3	51	W
49	January 21	2–0	New York Rangers	Emery	19,631	25–21–3	53	W
50	January 23	4–2	Carolina Hurricanes	Emery	19,732	26–21–3	55	W
51	January 24	1–2	Pittsburgh Penguins	Emery	19,798	26–22–3	55	L
52	January 28	3–4	Atlanta Thrashers	Emery	19,611	26–23–3	55	L
53	January 30	2–1	New York Islanders	Emery	19,787	27–23–3	57	W
Notes:^{b} 2010 NHL Winter Classic played at Fenway Park in Boston, Massachusetts.

February: 5–2–0, 10 points (home: 2–0–0; road: 3–2–0)

Game	Date	Score	Opponent	Decision	Attendance	Record	Points	Recap
54	February 1	3–0	@ Calgary Flames	Emery	19,289	28–23–3	59	W
55	February 3	0–1	@ Edmonton Oilers	Leighton	16,839	28–24–3	59	L
56	February 6	1–2	@ Minnesota Wild	Leighton	18,640	28–25–3	59	L
57	February 8	3–2	New Jersey Devils	Leighton	19,678	29–25–3	61	W
58	February 10	3–2 OT	@ New Jersey Devils	Leighton	5,580	30–25–3	63	W
59	February 12	3–2	Montreal Canadiens	Leighton	19,803	31–25–3	65	W
60	February 13	6–2	@ Montreal Canadiens	Leighton	21,273	32–25–3	67	W

March: 6–7–3, 15 points (home: 4–2–1; road: 2–5–2)

Game	Date	Score	Opponent	Decision	Attendance	Record	Points	Recap
61	March 2	7–2	@ Tampa Bay Lightning	Leighton	17,812	33–25–3	69	W
62	March 3	4–7	@ Florida Panthers	Boucher	15,878	33–26–3	69	L
63	March 5	2–3 OT	@ Buffalo Sabres	Leighton	18,690	33–26–4	70	OTL
64	March 7	3–1	Toronto Maple Leafs	Leighton	19,632	34–26–4	72	W
65	March 9	3–2	New York Islanders	Leighton	19,687	35–26–4	74	W
66	March 11	1–5	Boston Bruins	Leighton	19,673	35–27–4	74	L
67	March 13	3–2	Chicago Blackhawks	Leighton	19,858	36–27–4	76	W
68	March 14	1–3	@ New York Rangers	Leighton	18,200	36–28–4	76	L
69	March 16	3–4 SO	@ Nashville Predators	Boucher	16,585	36–28–5	77	OTL
70	March 18	3–2	@ Dallas Stars	Boucher	17,529	37–28–5	79	W
71	March 20	2–5	@ Atlanta Thrashers	Boucher	17,024	37–29–5	79	L
72	March 21	1–3	Atlanta Thrashers	Boucher	19,575	37–30–5	79	L
73	March 23	0–2	@ Ottawa Senators	Boucher	19,209	37–31–5	79	L
74	March 25	3–4 OT	Minnesota Wild	Boucher	19,716	37–31–6	80	OTL
75	March 27	1–4	@ Pittsburgh Penguins	Backlund	17,132	37–32–6	80	L
76	March 28	5–1	New Jersey Devils	Boucher	19,769	38–32–6	82	W

April: 3–3–0, 6 points (home: 2–1–0; road: 1–2–0)

Game	Date	Score	Opponent	Decision	Attendance	Record	Points	Recap
77	April 1	4–6	@ New York Islanders	Boucher	11,823	38–33–6	82	L
78	April 2	0–1	Montreal Canadiens	Boucher	19,801	38–34–6	82	L
79	April 4	4–3	Detroit Red Wings	Boucher	19,596	39–34–6	84	W
80	April 6	2–0	@ Toronto Maple Leafs	Boucher	19,366	40–34–6	86	W
81	April 9	3–4	@ New York Rangers	Boucher	18,200	40–35–6	86	L
82	April 11	2–1 SO	New York Rangers	Boucher	19,889	41–35–6	88	W

Legend: W Win (2 points) L Loss (0 points) OTL Overtime/shootout loss (1 point)

=== Playoffs ===
2010 Stanley Cup playoffs
Eastern Conference quarterfinals vs. New Jersey Devils – Flyers win 4–1

Game	Date	Score	Opponent	Decision	Attendance	Series	Recap
1	April 14	2–1	@ New Jersey Devils	Boucher	17,625	Flyers lead 1–0	W
2	April 16	3–5	@ New Jersey Devils	Boucher	17,625	Series tied 1–1	L
3	April 18	3–2 OT	New Jersey Devils	Boucher	19,957	Flyers lead 2–1	W
4	April 20	4–1	New Jersey Devils	Boucher	19,709	Flyers lead 3–1	W
5	April 22	3–0	@ New Jersey Devils	Boucher	17,625	Flyers win 4–1	W

Eastern Conference semifinals vs. Boston Bruins – Flyers win 4–3

Game	Date	Score	Opponent	Decision	Attendance	Series	Recap
1	May 1	4–5 OT	@ Boston Bruins	Boucher	17,565	Bruins lead 1–0	L
2	May 3	2–3	@ Boston Bruins	Boucher	17,565	Bruins lead 2–0	L
3	May 5	1–4	Boston Bruins	Boucher	19,688	Bruins lead 3–0	L
4	May 7	5–4 OT	Boston Bruins	Boucher	19,702	Bruins lead 3–1	W
5	May 10	4–0	@ Boston Bruins	Boucher	17,565	Bruins lead 3–2	W
6	May 12	2–1	Boston Bruins	Leighton	19,929	Series tied 3–3	W
7	May 14	4–3	@ Boston Bruins	Leighton	17,565	Flyers win 4–3	W

Eastern Conference finals vs. Montreal Canadiens – Flyers win 4–1

Game	Date	Score	Opponent	Decision	Attendance	Series	Recap
1	May 16	6–0	Montreal Canadiens	Leighton	19,927	Flyers lead 1–0	W
2	May 18	3–0	Montreal Canadiens	Leighton	19,907	Flyers lead 2–0	W
3	May 20	1–5	@ Montreal Canadiens	Leighton	21,273	Flyers lead 2–1	L
4	May 22	3–0	@ Montreal Canadiens	Leighton	21,273	Flyers lead 3–1	W
5	May 24	4–2	Montreal Canadiens	Leighton	19,986	Flyers win 4–1	W

Stanley Cup Final vs. Chicago Blackhawks – Blackhawks win 4–2

Game	Date	Score	Opponent	Decision	Attendance	Series	Recap
1	May 29	5–6	@ Chicago Blackhawks	Boucher	22,312	Blackhawks lead 1–0	L
2	May 31	1–2	@ Chicago Blackhawks	Leighton	22,275	Blackhawks lead 2–0	L
3	June 2	4–3 OT	Chicago Blackhawks	Leighton	20,297	Blackhawks lead 2–1	W
4	June 4	5–3	Chicago Blackhawks	Leighton	20,304	Series tied 2–2	W
5	June 6	4–7	@ Chicago Blackhawks	Boucher	22,305	Blackhawks lead 3–2	L
6	June 9	3–4 OT	Chicago Blackhawks	Leighton	20,327	Blackhawks win 4–2	L

Legend: W Win L Loss

== Player statistics ==
=== Scoring ===
- Position abbreviations: C = Center; D = Defense; G = Goaltender; LW = Left wing; RW = Right wing
- † = Joined team via a transaction (e.g., trade, waivers, signing) during the season. Stats reflect time with the Flyers only.
- ‡ = Left team via a transaction (e.g., trade, waivers, release) during the season. Stats reflect time with the Flyers only.

No.	Player	Pos	Regular season						Playoffs					
No.	Player	Pos	GP	G	A	Pts	+/-	PIM	GP	G	A	Pts	+/-	PIM
18	Mike Richards	C	82	31	31	62	−2	79	23	7	16	23	−1	18
17	Jeff Carter	C	74	33	28	61	2	38	12	5	2	7	−5	2
20	Chris Pronger	D	82	10	45	55	22	79	23	4	14	18	5	36
48	Danny Briere	C	75	26	27	53	−2	71	23	12	18	30	9	16
28	Claude Giroux	RW	82	16	31	47	−9	23	23	10	11	21	7	4
19	Scott Hartnell	LW	81	14	30	44	−6	155	23	8	9	17	4	25
12	Simon Gagne	LW	58	17	23	40	−1	47	19	9	3	12	−2	0
44	Kimmo Timonen	D	82	6	33	39	−2	50	23	1	10	11	6	20
21	James van Riemsdyk	LW	78	15	20	35	−1	30	21	3	3	6	−4	4
25	Matt Carle	D	80	6	29	35	19	16	23	1	12	13	6	8
45	Arron Asham	RW	72	10	14	24	−2	126	23	4	3	7	4	10
13	Daniel Carcillo	LW	76	12	10	22	5	207	17	2	4	6	1	34
14	Ian Laperriere	RW	82	3	17	20	−1	162	13	0	1	1	−3	6
5	Braydon Coburn	D	81	5	14	19	−6	54	23	1	3	4	−2	22
11	Blair Betts	C	63	8	10	18	7	14	23	1	1	2	−4	4
36	Darroll Powe	C	63	9	6	15	0	54	23	0	1	1	−2	6
3	Oskars Bartulis	D	53	1	8	9	−12	28	7	0	0	0	−1	4
22	Ville Leino†	LW	13	2	2	4	2	4	19	7	14	21	10	6
27	Mika Pyorala	C	36	2	2	4	−3	10	—	—	—	—	—	—
26	Danny Syvret	D	21	2	2	4	1	12	—	—	—	—	—	—
9	David Laliberte	RW	11	2	1	3	1	6	1	0	0	0	0	2
77	Ryan Parent	D	48	1	2	3	−14	20	17	1	0	1	−2	2
2	Lukas Krajicek†	D	27	1	1	2	−10	14	22	0	3	3	0	8
37	Jon Kalinski	C	10	0	2	2	−2	0	—	—	—	—	—	—
55	Ole-Kristian Tollefsen‡	D	18	0	2	2	1	23	—	—	—	—	—	—
33	Brian Boucher	G	33	0	1	1		2	12	0	0	0		2
29	Ray Emery	G	29	0	1	1		2	—	—	—	—	—	—
49	Michael Leighton†	G	27	0	1	1		0	14	0	0	0		2
15	Andreas Nodl	RW	10	0	1	1	−2	0	10	0	0	0	−1	0
30	Johan Backlund	G	1	0	0	0		0	1	0	0	0		0
32	Riley Cote	LW	15	0	0	0	0	24	—	—	—	—	—	—
35	Jeremy Duchesne	G	1	0	0	0		0	—	—	—	—	—	—
42	Jared Ross	C	3	0	0	0	−1	0	3	0	0	0	0	0

=== Goaltending ===
- † = Joined team via a transaction (e.g., trade, waivers, signing) during the season. Stats reflect time with the Flyers only.
- ‡ = Left team via a transaction (e.g., trade, waivers, release) during the season. Stats reflect time with the Flyers only.

No.	Player	Regular season											Playoffs									
No.	Player	GP	GS	W	L	OT	SA	GA	GAA	SV%	SO	TOI	GP	GS	W	L	SA	GA	GAA	SV%	SO	TOI
29	Ray Emery	29	29	16	11	1	783	74	2.64	.905	3	1,684	—	—	—	—	—	—	—	—	—	—
49	Michael Leighton†	27	26	16	5	2	735	60	2.48	.918	1	1,449	14	13	8	3	371	31	2.46	.916	3	757
33	Brian Boucher	33	26	9	18	3	796	80	2.76	.899	1	1,742	12	10	6	6	298	27	2.47	.909	1	656
30	Johan Backlund	1	1	0	1	0	24	2	3.00	.917	0	40	1	0	0	0	0	0	0.00	—	0	1
35	Jeremy Duchesne	1	0	0	0	0	4	1	3.59	.750	0	17	—	—	—	—	—	—	—	—	—	—

== Awards and records ==
=== Awards ===
Type	Award/honor	Recipient	Ref
League	NHL Rookie of the Month	James van Riemsdyk (December 2)	
League	NHL Second Star of the Week	Michael Leighton (February 15)	
League	NHL Third Star of the Week	Chris Pronger (November 9)	
Team	Barry Ashbee Trophy	Chris Pronger	
Team	Bobby Clarke Trophy	Chris Pronger	
Team	Gene Hart Memorial Award	Ian Laperriere	
Team	Pelle Lindbergh Memorial Trophy	Matt Carle	
Team	Toyota Cup	Mike Richards	
Team	Yanick Dupre Memorial Class Guy Award	Ian Laperriere	

=== Records ===
Among the team records set during the 2009–10 season was three franchise single period records tied during the second period of the home opener on October 6. Mike Richards scored three goals and defenseman Matt Carle picked up four assists (also tying the single period points record). Eight months later Carle would tie the team record for assists in a playoff game (4) in game four of the team's conference semifinals series against the Boston Bruins. During the conference finals against the Montreal Canadiens, goaltender Michael Leighton tied an NHL single playoff series record with three shutouts. During the 2010 Stanley Cup Final against the Chicago Blackhawks, Danny Briere set a team record with nine assists in the series.

The Flyers set a number of team single playoff year records during their run to the Stanley Cup Final. Briere set a new playoff team record for points (30) and tied the high mark for game-winning goals (4). Chris Pronger’s 18 points and three powerplay goals tied the team records for defensemen. Ville Leino tied the NHL records for most assists by a rookie (14) and most points by a rookie (21). The Flyers tied franchise playoff highs for most home wins (9) and most shutouts (5) while setting new marks for most road losses (7) and most powerplay goals (23).

=== Milestones ===
Milestone	Player	Date	Ref
First game	Mika Pyorala	October 2, 2009	
First game	James van Riemsdyk	October 2, 2009	
First game	David Laliberte	October 31, 2009	
First game	Oskars Bartulis	November 12, 2009	
First game	Johan Backlund	March 27, 2010	
First game	Jeremy Duchesne	April 1, 2010	

== Transactions ==
The Flyers were involved in the following transactions from June 13, 2009, the day after the deciding game of the 2009 Stanley Cup Final, through June 9, 2010, the day of the deciding game of the 2010 Stanley Cup Final.

=== Trades ===
Date	Details		Ref
June 26, 2009	To Philadelphia Flyers: Ryan Dingle; Chris Pronger	To Anaheim Ducks: Joffrey Lupul; Luca Sbisa; 1st-round pick (21st overall) in 2009; 1st-round pick in 2010; Conditional 3rd-round pick in 2010 or 2011 (Note: The Ducks would have received their choice of either the 2010 or 2011 third-round pick if the Flyers won the Stanley Cup in 2010; condition not satisfied.)	
September 23, 2009	To Philadelphia Flyers: Future considerations	To Nashville Predators: Patrik Hersley	
October 20, 2009	To Philadelphia Flyers: Stefan Legein	To Columbus Blue Jackets: Mike Ratchuk	
February 6, 2010	To Philadelphia Flyers: Ville Leino	To Detroit Red Wings: Ole-Kristian Tollefsen; 5th-round pick in 2011	

=== Players acquired ===
Date	Player	Former team	Term	Via	Ref
July 1, 2009	Brian Boucher	San Jose Sharks	2-year	Free agency	
July 1, 2009	Ian Laperriere	Colorado Avalanche	3-year	Free agency	
July 23, 2009	Lukas Kaspar	San Jose Sharks	1-year	Free agency	
July 23, 2009	Krys Kolanos	Minnesota Wild	1-year	Free agency	
July 23, 2009	Joey Mormina	Pittsburgh Penguins	1-year	Free agency	
July 23, 2009	Mika Pyorala	Timra IK (SHL)	1-year	Free agency	
July 23, 2009	Jason Ward	Tampa Bay Lightning	1-year	Free agency	
July 30, 2009	Ole-Kristian Tollefsen	Columbus Blue Jackets	1-year	Free agency	
September 21, 2009	Tyler Hostetter	Erie Otters (OHL)	3-year	Free agency	
October 1, 2009	Blair Betts	New York Rangers	1-year	Free agency	
December 15, 2009	Michael Leighton	Carolina Hurricanes		Re-entry waivers	
January 31, 2010	Lukas Krajicek	Tampa Bay Lightning	1-year	Free agency	
March 4, 2010	Shane Harper	Everett Silvertips (WHL)	3-year	Free agency	
March 4, 2010	Luke Pither	Belleville Bulls (OHL)	3-year	Free agency	
March 17, 2010	Ben Holmstrom	University of Massachusetts Lowell (HE)	2-year	Free agency	
March 19, 2010	Mike Testwuide	Colorado College (WCHA)	2-year	Free agency	
March 31, 2010	Erik Gustafsson	Northern Michigan University (CCHA)	3-year	Free agency	
April 2, 2010	Sebastien Caron	HC Fribourg-Gotteron (NLA)	1-year (Note: Signed for the remainder of the regular season.)	Free agency	
May 6, 2010	Sergei Bobrovsky	Metallurg Novokuznetsk (KHL)	3-year	Free agency	
May 6, 2010	Andrew Rowe	Michigan State University (CCHA)	2-year	Free agency	
May 6, 2010	Brian Stewart	Northern Michigan University (CCHA)	1-year	Free agency	

=== Players lost ===
Date	Player	New team	Via (Note: In parentheses is the player's free agency group on July 1 if applicable.)	Ref
June 15, 2009	Derian Hatcher		Retirement (III)	
June 24, 2009	Lasse Kukkonen	Avangard Omsk (KHL)	Free agency (III)	
July 1, 2009	Mike Knuble	Washington Capitals	Free agency (III)	
July 2, 2009	Scott Munroe	New York Islanders	Free agency (III)	
July 3, 2009	Nate Guenin	Pittsburgh Penguins	Free agency (VI)	
July 6, 2009	Nate Raduns	SG Pontebba (Serie A)	Free agency (UFA)	
July 10, 2009	Antero Niittymaki	Tampa Bay Lightning	Free agency (III)	
July 11, 2009	Boyd Kane	Washington Capitals	Free agency (III)	
July 15, 2009	Andrew Alberts	Carolina Hurricanes	Free agency (III)	
July 22, 2009	Martin Biron	New York Islanders	Free agency (III)	
July 23, 2009	Jean-Sebastien Aubin	DEG Metro Stars (DEL)	Free agency (III)	
July 30, 2009	Josh Gratton	Atlanta Thrashers	Free agency (UFA)	
October 29, 2009	Randy Jones	Los Angeles Kings	Re-entry waivers	
November 3, 2009	Lukas Kaspar	Karpat (Liiga) (Note: Kaspar signed with Karpat on November 4.)	Release	

=== Signings ===
Date	Player	Term	Contract type	Ref
July 7, 2009	Chris Pronger	7-year	Extension	
July 24, 2009	Marc-Andre Bourdon	3-year	Entry-level	
August 11, 2009	Zac Rinaldo	3-year	Entry-level	
August 11, 2009	Danny Syvret	1-year	Re-signing	
December 2, 2009	Oskars Bartulis	3-year	Extension	
February 11, 2010	Blair Betts	2-year	Extension	
March 4, 2010	Eric Wellwood	3-year	Entry-level	

== Draft picks ==
Philadelphia's picks at the 2009 NHL entry draft, which was held at Bell Centre in Montreal on June 26–27, 2009. The Flyers traded their 2009, 21st overall, and 2010 first-round picks, Joffrey Lupul, Luca Sbisa and a conditional 2010 or 2011 third-round pick to the Anaheim Ducks for Ryan Dingle and Chris Pronger on June 26, 2009. They also traded their originally allotted second, third, fourth, and seventh-round picks in four separate trades.

Round	Pick	Player	Position	Nationality	Team (league)	Notes
3	81	Adam Morrison	Goaltender	Canada	Saskatoon Blades (WHL)	(Note: The Flyers traded Jim Vandermeer to the Calgary Flames for the Flames' third-round pick, 81st overall, on February 20, 2008.)
3	87	Simon Bertilsson	Defense	Sweden	Brynas IF (Elitserien)	(Note: The Flyers traded the Tampa Bay Lightning's fourth-round pick, 93rd overall, Steve Downie, Steve Eminger to Tampa Bay for the San Jose Sharks' third-round pick, 87th overall and Matt Carle on November 7, 2008.)
5	142	Nicola Riopel	Goaltender	Canada	Moncton Wildcats (QMJHL)	
6	153	Dave Labrecque	Center	Canada	Shawinigan Cataractes (QMJHL)	(Note: The Flyers traded Janne Niskala to the Tampa Bay Lightning for the Lightning's sixth-round pick, 153rd overall, on June 30, 2008.)
6	172	Eric Wellwood	Left wing	Canada	Windsor Spitfires (OHL)	
7	196	Oliver Lauridsen	Defense	Denmark	St. Cloud State University (WCHA)	(Note: The Flyers traded their 2008 seventh-round pick to the Anaheim Ducks for the Ducks' seventh-round pick, 196th overall, on June 21, 2008.)

== Farm teams ==
American Hockey League – Adirondack Phantoms (Standings)

The Flyers' AHL affiliate team is now the Adirondack Phantoms in Glens Falls, New York for the 2009–10 season. The Phantoms relocated from Philadelphia due to the demolition of the Wachovia Spectrum.

ECHL – Kalamazoo Wings (Standings)

International Hockey League – Quad City Mallards
