= 2009–10 New Jersey Devils season =

National Hockey League season

2009–10 New Jersey Devils
- Atlantic Division champions
- Division: 1st Atlantic
- Conference: 2nd Eastern
- 2009–10 record: 48–27–7
- Home record: 27–10–4
- Road record: 21–17–3
- Goals for: 222
- Goals against: 191

Team information
- General manager: Lou Lamoriello
- Coach: Jacques Lemaire
- Captain: Jamie Langenbrunner
- Alternate captains: Patrik Elias; Zach Parise
- Arena: Prudential Center
- Average attendance: 15,536

Team leaders
- Goals: Zach Parise (38)
- Assists: Zach Parise (44)
- Points: Zach Parise (82)
- Penalty minutes: Andrew Peters (93)
- Plus/minus: Zach Parise (+24)
- Wins: Martin Brodeur (45)
- Goals against average: Yann Danis (2.06)

The 2009–10 New Jersey Devils season was the 36th season for the National Hockey League (NHL) franchise that was established on June 11, 1974, and 28th season since the franchise relocated from Colorado prior to the 1982–83 NHL season.

== Off-season ==
On June 9, 2009, Brent Sutter resigned as head coach of the Devils to become the head coach of the Calgary Flames.

At the Entry Draft, the Devils traded with the Calgary Flames to move up in the draft and chose Jacob Josefson with the 20th overall pick.

On July 13, 2009, the Devils named Jacques Lemaire as their new head coach. This was Lemaire's 2nd stint with the club. He won the Stanley Cup as head coach of the Devils back in 1995.

== Preseason ==
Pre-season: 4–0–1 (Home: 3–0–0; Road: 1–0–1)

Game	Date	Opponent	Score	Location/attendance	Record
1	September 16	New York Rangers	3–2 (SO)	Prudential Center – 10,481	1–0–0
2	September 23	New York Islanders	4–2	Nassau Veterans Memorial Coliseum – 8,256	2–0–0
3	September 24	Philadelphia Flyers	1–2 (OT)	Wachovia Center – 17,650	2–0–1
4	September 26	Philadelphia Flyers	1–0	Prudential Center – 11,167	3–0–1
5	September 29	New York Islanders	4–2	Prudential Center – 10,311	4–0–1

Win Loss Overtime/shootout loss

== Regular season ==
The Devils allowed only 186 goals (excluding five shootout goals) during the regular season, the fewest of all 30 teams. They were also the most disciplined team in the NHL, with just 240 power-play opportunities against.

- December 21, 2009 – In a victory over the Pittsburgh Penguins, Martin Brodeur broke Terry Sawchuk's record for the most regular-season shutouts with his 104th career shutout. Then, he shut out the Penguins again on December 30, 2009, earning him his 105th shutout, giving him the all-time professional record for most shutouts.
- April 6, 2010 – In a victory over the Atlanta Thrashers, Martin Brodeur earned his 600th career win and 110th career shutout.

=== Divisional standings ===
Atlantic Division
		GP	W	L	OTL	GF	GA	Pts
**1**	**New Jersey Devils**	**82**	**48**	**27**	**7**	**222**	**191**	**103**
**2**	**Pittsburgh Penguins**	**82**	**47**	**28**	**7**	**257**	**237**	**101**
**3**	**Philadelphia Flyers**	**82**	**41**	**35**	**6**	**236**	**225**	**88**
4	New York Rangers	82	38	33	11	222	218	87
5	New York Islanders	82	34	37	11	222	264	79

=== Conference standings ===
Eastern Conference
R		Div	GP	W	L	OTL	GF	GA	Pts
**1**	**p – Washington Capitals**	**SE**	**82**	**54**	**15**	**13**	**318**	**233**	121
**2**	**y – New Jersey Devils**	**AT**	**82**	**48**	**27**	**7**	**222**	**191**	103
**3**	**y – Buffalo Sabres**	**NE**	**82**	**45**	**27**	**10**	**235**	**207**	100
**4**	**Pittsburgh Penguins**	**AT**	**82**	**47**	**28**	**7**	**257**	**237**	101
**5**	**Ottawa Senators**	**NE**	**82**	**44**	**32**	**6**	**225**	**238**	94
**6**	**Boston Bruins**	**NE**	**82**	**39**	**30**	**13**	**206**	**200**	91
**7**	**Philadelphia Flyers**	**AT**	**82**	**41**	**35**	**6**	**236**	**225**	88
**8**	**Montreal Canadiens**	**NE**	**82**	**39**	**33**	**10**	**217**	**223**	88
8.5
9	New York Rangers	AT	82	38	33	11	222	218	87
10	Atlanta Thrashers	SE	82	35	34	13	234	256	83
11	Carolina Hurricanes	SE	82	35	37	10	230	256	80
12	Tampa Bay Lightning	SE	82	34	36	12	217	260	80
13	New York Islanders	AT	82	34	37	11	222	264	79
14	Florida Panthers	SE	82	32	37	13	208	244	77
15	Toronto Maple Leafs	NE	82	30	38	14	214	267	74

bold – Qualified for playoffs; y – Won division; p – Won Presidents' Trophy (and division)

AT – Atlantic Division, NE – Northeast Division, SE – Southeast Division

== Schedule and results ==
2009–10 game log: 48–27–7, 101 points (Home: 27–10–3; Road: 21–17–3)
October: 8–4–0, 16 points (Home: 1–4–0; Road: 7–0–0)

Game	Date	Opponent	Score	Location/Attendance	Record	Points
1	October 3	Philadelphia Flyers	2–5	Prudential Center – 17,625	0–1–0	0
2	October 5	New York Rangers	2–3	Prudential Center – 17,625	0–2–0	0
3	October 8	Tampa Bay Lightning	4–3 (SO)	St. Pete Times Forum – 17,454	1–2–0	2
4	October 10	Florida Panthers	3–2	BankAtlantic Center – 18,802	2–2–0	4
5	October 12	Washington Capitals	3–2 (SO)	Verizon Center – 18,277	3–2–0	6
6	October 16	Atlanta Thrashers	2–4	Prudential Center – 14,187	3–3–0	6
7	October 17	Carolina Hurricanes	2–0	Prudential Center – 15,021	4–3–0	8
8	October 22	New York Rangers	4–2	Madison Square Garden – 18,200	5–3–0	10
9	October 24	Pittsburgh Penguins	4–1	Mellon Arena – 17,132	6–3–0	12
10	October 28	Buffalo Sabres	1–4	Prudential Center – 14,182	6–4–0	12
11	October 29	Boston Bruins	2–1	TD Garden – 17,565	7–4–0	14
12	October 31	Tampa Bay Lightning	2–1 (SO)	St. Pete Times Forum – 12,154	8–4–0	16

November: 9–2–1, 19 points (Home: 6–0–0; Road: 3–2–1)

Game	Date	Opponent	Score	Location/Attendance	Record	Points
13	November 4	Washington Capitals	3–2	Prudential Center – 13,498	9–4–0	18
14	November 6	New York Islanders	2–1	Prudential Center – 14,109	10–4–0	20
15	November 7	Ottawa Senators	3–2	Scotiabank Place – 18,781	11–4–0	22
16	November 11	Anaheim Ducks	3–1	Prudential Center – 14,123	12–4–0	24
17	November 12	Pittsburgh Penguins	4–1	Mellon Arena – 17,005	13–4–0	26
18	November 14	Washington Capitals	5–2	Prudential Center – 16,521	14–4–0	28
19	November 16	Philadelphia Flyers	2–3	Wachovia Center – 19,673	14–5–0	28
20	November 19	Nashville Predators	2–3 (SO)	Sommet Center – 13,445	14–5–1	29
21	November 21	Dallas Stars	3–5	American Airlines Center – 17,514	14–6–1	29
22	November 25	Ottawa Senators	3–1	Prudential Center – 14,056	15–6–1	31
23	November 27	Boston Bruins	2–1 (SO)	TD Garden – 17,565	16–6–1	33
24	November 28	New York Islanders	6–1	Prudential Center – 16,961	17–6–1	35

December: 11–4–0, 22 points (Home: 8–2–0; Road: 3–1–0)

Game	Date	Opponent	Score	Location/Attendance	Record	Points
25	December 2	Vancouver Canucks	2–5	Prudential Center – 13,586	17–7–1	35
26	December 4	Tampa Bay Lightning	3–2	Prudential Center – 15,336	18–7–1	37
27	December 5	Detroit Red Wings	4–3 (SO)	Prudential Center – 17,625	19–7–1	39
28	December 7	Buffalo Sabres	3–0	HSBC Arena – 18,690	20–7–1	41
29	December 9	Carolina Hurricanes	4–2	Prudential Center – 12,013	21–7–1	43
30	December 11	Florida Panthers	2–4	Prudential Center – 14,132	21–8–1	43
31	December 12	Philadelphia Flyers	4–1	Prudential Center – 15,724	22–8–1	45
32	December 16	Montreal Canadiens	2–1	Prudential Center – 12,178	23–8–1	47
33	December 18	Ottawa Senators	4–2	Prudential Center – 13,728	24–8–1	49
34	December 19	Atlanta Thrashers	5–4	Philips Arena – 14,616	25–8–1	51
35	December 21	Pittsburgh Penguins	4–0	Mellon Arena – 17,132	26–8–1	53
36	December 26	Washington Capitals	1–4	Verizon Center – 18,277	26–9–1	53
37	December 28	Atlanta Thrashers	3–2	Prudential Center – 17,024	27–9–1	55
38	December 30	Pittsburgh Penguins	2–0	Prudential Center – 17,625	28–9–1	57
39	December 31	Chicago Blackhawks	1–5	United Center – 21,614	28–10–1	57

January: 7–7–1, 15 points (Home: 3–3–0; Road: 4–4–1)

Game	Date	Opponent	Score	Location/Attendance	Record	Points
40	January 2	Minnesota Wild	5–3	Xcel Energy Center – 19,155	29–10–1	59
41	January 5	Dallas Stars	4–0	Prudential Center – 14,202	30–10–1	61
42	January 8/10 (Note: Game 42 began on January 8, however, it was completed on January 10 due to a partial blackout of the sports lighting at the Prudential Center. See #Lighting incident for more information.)	Tampa Bay Lightning	2–4	Prudential Center – 15,129	30–11–1	61
43	January 9	Montreal Canadiens	2–1 (OT)	Bell Centre – 21,273	31–11–1	63
44	January 12	New York Rangers	1–0 (SO)	Madison Square Garden – 18,200	32–11–1	65
45	January 14	Phoenix Coyotes	3–4	Jobing.com Arena – 9,430	32–12–1	65
46	January 16	Colorado Avalanche	1–3	Pepsi Center – 17,816	32–13–1	65
47	January 18	New York Islanders	0–4	Nassau Veterans Memorial Coliseum – 16,250	32–14–1	65
48	January 20	Florida Panthers	2–0	Prudential Center – 13,931	33–14–1	67
49	January 22	Montreal Canadiens	1–3	Prudential Center – 17,625	33–15–1	67
50	January 23	New York Islanders	4–2	Nassau Veterans Memorial Coliseum – 16,250	34–15–1	69
51	January 26	Ottawa Senators	0–3	Scotiabank Place – 18,107	34–16–1	69
52	January 27	Buffalo Sabres	1–2 (SO)	HSBC Arena – 18,690	34–16–2	70
53	January 29	Toronto Maple Leafs	5–4 (OT)	Prudential Center – 15,536	35–16–2	72
54	January 31	Los Angeles Kings	2–3	Prudential Center – 17,625	35–17–2	72

February: 2–4–1, 5 points (Home: 2–0–1; Road: 0–3–0)

Game	Date	Opponent	Score	Location/Attendance	Record	Points
55	February 2	Toronto Maple Leafs	0–3	Air Canada Centre – 19,326	35–18–2	72
56	February 5	Toronto Maple Leafs	4–3	Prudential Center – 15,204	36–18–2	74
57	February 6	New York Rangers	1–3	Madison Square Garden – 18,200	36–19–2	74
58	February 8	Philadelphia Flyers	2–3	Wachovia Center – 19,678	36–20–2	74
59	February 10	Philadelphia Flyers	2–3 (OT)	Prudential Center – 5,580	36–20–3	75
60	February 12	Nashville Predators	5–2	Prudential Center – 17,625	37–20–3	77
61	February 13	Carolina Hurricanes	2–5	RBC Center – 16,466	37–21–3	77

March: 7–5–3, 17 points (Home: 5–1–2; Road: 2–4–1)

Game	Date	Opponent	Score	Location/Attendance	Record	Points
62	March 2	San Jose Sharks	4–3	HP Pavilion – 17,562	38–21–3	79
63	March 5	Calgary Flames	3–5	Pengrowth Saddledome – 19,289	38–22–3	79
64	March 7	Edmonton Oilers	0–2	Rexall Place – 16,839	38–23–3	79
65	March 10	New York Rangers	6–3	Prudential Center – 17,625	39–23–3	81
66	March 12	Pittsburgh Penguins	3–1	Prudential Center – 17,625	40–23–3	83
67	March 13	New York Islanders	2–4	Nassau Veterans Memorial Coliseum – 15,583	40–24–3	83
68	March 15	Boston Bruins	3–2	Prudential Center – 15,801	41–24–3	85
69	March 17	Pittsburgh Penguins	5–2	Prudential Center – 17,625	42–24–3	87
70	March 18	Toronto Maple Leafs	1–2 (SO)	Air Canada Centre – 19,183	42–24–4	88
71	March 20	St. Louis Blues	0–1	Prudential Center – 17,625	42–25–4	88
72	March 23	Columbus Blue Jackets	6–3	Prudential Center – 14,202	43–25–4	90
73	March 25	New York Rangers	3–4 (SO)	Prudential Center – 17,625	43–25–5	91
74	March 27	Montreal Canadiens	4–2	Bell Centre – 21,273	44–25–5	93
75	March 28	Philadelphia Flyers	1–5	Wachovia Center – 19,769	44–26–5	93
76	March 30	Boston Bruins	0–1 (OT)	Prudential Center – 16,636	44–26–6	94

April: 4–1–1, 9 points (Home: 2–0–1; Road: 2–1–0)

Game	Date	Opponent	Score	Location/Attendance	Record	Points
77	April 2	Chicago Blackhawks	1–2 (SO)	Prudential Center – 17,625	44–26–7	95
78	April 3	Carolina Hurricanes	4–0	RBC Center – 16,073	45–26–7	97
79	April 6	Atlanta Thrashers	3–0	Philips Arena – 12,038	46–26–7	99
80	April 8	Florida Panthers	2–3	BankAtlantic Center – 15,273	46–27–7	99
81	April 10	New York Islanders	7–1	Prudential Center – 17,625	47–27–7	101
82	April 11	Buffalo Sabres	2–1	Prudential Center – 17,625	48–27–7	103

2009–10 schedule

Win (2 points) Loss (0 points) Overtime/shootout loss (1 point)

=== Lighting incident ===
On January 8, 2010, a lighting problem occurred in the arena during a game between the Devils and the Tampa Bay Lightning. Tampa Bay was leading 3–0 with 9:12 left in the second period when half of the sports lights went out due to an interruption in power on the grid feeding electricity to the arena, followed by a failure of a computer-operated lighting system that allowed the sports lighting system to function with the circuit breakers. PSE&G and Prudential Center electricians worked on the situation for 1 hour and 52 minutes but could not reboot the system. The game was suspended due to the lighting problem; it was resumed two nights later, with about 3,000 of the original crowd of 15,129 in attendance. The Devils, Tampa Bay Lightning and the NHL agreed to waive a rule prohibiting players from participating in an NHL-sanctioned event on three consecutive nights as per the NHL Collective Bargaining Agreement. Tampa Bay won, 4–2, with Lightning center Steven Stamkos scoring two goals in the contest: one on Friday and one on Sunday.

== Playoffs ==
With their win on March 27, 2010, against the Montreal Canadiens at Bell Centre, the Devils clinched a playoff berth and participated in the Stanley Cup playoffs for the 13th consecutive season and for the 20th time in 22 seasons.

2010 Stanley Cup playoffs

Eastern Conference Quarter-finals: vs. (7) Philadelphia Flyers – Philadelphia wins series 4–1
#	Date	Visitor	Score	Home	OT	Decision	Attendance	Series	Recap
1	April 14	Philadelphia Flyers	2–1	New Jersey Devils		Brodeur	17,625	Flyers lead 1–0
2	April 16	Philadelphia Flyers	3–5	New Jersey Devils		Brodeur	17,625	Series tied 1–1
3	April 18	New Jersey Devils	2–3	Philadelphia Flyers	OT	Brodeur	19,957	Flyers lead 2–1
4	April 20	New Jersey Devils	1–4	Philadelphia Flyers		Brodeur	19,709	Flyers lead 3–1
5	April 22	Philadelphia Flyers	3–0	New Jersey Devils		Brodeur	17,625	Flyers win 4–1

Win Loss Win playoff series Eliminated from playoffs

== Player statistics ==
=== Skaters ===
Note: GP = Games played; G = Goals; A = Assists; Pts = Points; +/− = Plus/Minus; PIM = Penalty minutes

Regular season

Player	GP	G	A	Pts	+/−	PIM
Zach Parise	81	38	44	82	24	32
Travis Zajac	82	25	42	67	22	24
Jamie Langenbrunner	81	19	42	61	6	44
Patrik Elias	58	19	29	48	18	40
Brian Rolston	80	20	17	37	2	22
Andy Greene	78	6	31	37	9	14
Dainius Zubrus	51	10	17	27	4	28
Ilya Kovalchuk^{†}	27	10	17	27	9	8
Niclas Bergfors^{‡}	54	13	14	27	−7	10
David Clarkson	46	11	13	24	3	85
Rob Niedermayer	71	10	12	22	3	45
Mike Mottau	79	2	16	18	4	41
Dean McAmmond	62	8	9	17	−1	40
Bryce Salvador	79	4	10	14	8	57
Colin White	81	2	10	12	8	46
Paul Martin	22	2	9	11	10	2
Rod Pelley	63	2	8	10	−4	40
Vladimir Zharkov	40	0	10	10	2	8
Jay Pandolfo	52	4	5	9	−10	6
Mark Fraser	61	3	3	6	3	36
Ilkka Pikkarainen	31	1	3	4	−3	10
Johnny Oduya^{‡}	40	2	2	4	2	18
Cory Murphy	12	2	1	3	−2	2
Martin Skoula^{†}	19	0	3	3	7	4
Anssi Salmela^{†}	9	1	2	3	−5	0
Pierre-Luc Letourneau-Leblond	27	0	2	2	−4	48
Matthew Halischuk	20	1	1	2	−4	2
Tyler Eckford	3	0	1	1	0	4
Tim Sestito	9	0	1	1	−2	2
Patrick Davis	8	1	0	1	−2	0
Nick Palmieri	6	0	1	1	0	0
Andrew Peters	29	0	0	0	−5	93
Rob Davison	1	0	0	0	0	0
Ben Walter	2	0	0	0	0	2
Matthew Corrente	12	0	0	0	0	24

Playoffs

Player	GP	G	A	Pts	+/−	PIM
Ilya Kovalchuk	5	2	4	6	0	6
Patrik Elias	5	0	4	4	−2	2
Zach Parise	5	1	3	4	0	0
Brian Rolston	5	2	1	3	−1	0
Travis Zajac	5	1	1	2	1	2
Andy Greene	5	1	1	2	0	6
Jamie Langenbrunner	5	0	1	1	−1	4
Dainius Zubrus	5	1	0	1	0	8
Colin White	5	1	0	1	−1	8
Mike Mottau	5	0	1	1	0	0
Dean McAmmond	5	0	0	0	−1	4
Rob Niedermayer	5	0	0	0	−1	6
Bryce Salvador	5	0	0	0	1	6
Martin Skoula	4	0	0	0	−1	0
Paul Martin	5	0	0	0	−2	0
David Clarkson	5	0	0	0	−1	22
Pierre-Luc Letourneau-Leblond	5	0	0	0	0	10
Mark Fraser	1	0	0	0	−1	0
Rod Pelley	3	0	0	0	0	2
Matthew Corrente	2	0	0	0	0	2

=== Goaltenders ===
Regular season

Player	GP	Min	W	L	OT	GA	GAA	SA	Sv%	SO	G	A	PIM
Martin Brodeur	76	4499	45	25	6	168	2.24	2004	.916	9	0	3	6
Yann Danis	12	467	3	2	1	16	2.06	207	.923	0	0	0	0

Playoffs

Player	GP	Min	W	L	GA	GAA	SA	Sv%	SO
Martin Brodeur	5	299	1	4	15	3.01	126	.881	0

^{†}Denotes player spent time with another team before joining Devils. Stats reflect time with Devils only.
^{‡}Traded mid-season. Stats reflect time with Devils only.

Note:

Pos = Position;GP = Games played; G = Goals; A = Assists; Pts = Points; PIM = Penalty minutes; +/- = Plus/minus; PPG = Power-play goals; SHG = Short-handed goals; GWG = Game-winning goals
Pos = Position;GP = Games played; Min, TOI = Minutes played; W = Wins; L = Losses; T,T/OT = Ties; OTL = Overtime losses; GA = Goals-against; GAA = Goals-against average; SO = Shutouts; SA = Shots against; SV = Shots saved;SV% = Save percentage;

== Awards and records ==
=== Awards ===
Regular season
Player	Award	Awarded
Martin Brodeur	William M. Jennings Trophy	End of regular season
Martin Brodeur	NHL Second Star of the Week	November 30, 2009
Jamie Langenbrunner	NHL First Star of the Week	January 4, 2010
Ilya Kovalchuk	NHL Third Star of the Week	March 29, 2010

=== Nominations ===
Regular Season
Player	Award	Place
Martin Brodeur	Vezina Trophy	Finalist

=== Records ===
Player	Record (amount)	Achieved
Martin Brodeur	Most career minutes played by a goaltender in the NHL (60,963)	November 27, 2009
Martin Brodeur	Most games played by an NHL goaltender (1,030)	December 18, 2009
Martin Brodeur	Most shutouts by an NHL goaltender (104)	December 21, 2009

=== Milestones ===
Regular season
Player	Milestone	Reached
Ilkka Pikkarainen	1st NHL game	October 5, 2009
Colin White	600th NHL game	October 17, 2009
Mike Mottau	100th NHL PIM	October 22, 2009
John Oduya	150th NHL PIM	October 22, 2009
Jay Pandolfo	150th NHL PIM	October 24, 2009
Mark Fraser	1st NHL goal 1st NHL point	October 24, 2009
Mark Fraser	1st NHL assist	October 31, 2009
Travis Zajac	150th NHL point	November 4, 2009
Ilkka Pikkarainen	1st NHL assist 1st NHL point	November 6, 2009
Martin Brodeur	1,000th NHL career start	November 7, 2009
Jamie Langenbrunner	900th NHL game	November 11, 2009
Matt Halischuk	1st NHL goal	November 14, 2009
Tim Sestito	1st NHL assist 1st NHL point	November 14, 2009
Bryce Salvador	550th NHL game	November 16, 2009
Travis Zajac	100th NHL assist	November 19, 2009
Tyler Eckford	1st NHL game	November 19, 2009
Tyler Eckford	1st NHL assist 1st NHL point	November 21, 2009
Matthew Corrente	1st NHL game	November 21, 2009
Andy Greene	150th NHL game	November 25, 2009
Mike Mottau	200th NHL game	November 25, 2009
Jamie Langenbrunner	350th NHL assist	November 28, 2009
Vladimir Zharkov	1st NHL game	November 28, 2009
Vladimir Zharkov	1st NHL assist 1st NHL point	December 4, 2009
Zach Parise	150th NHL assist	December 9, 2009
Patrik Elias	300th NHL goal	December 12, 2009
Ilkka Pikkarainen	1st NHL goal	December 16, 2009
John Oduya	250th NHL game	December 16, 2009
Dean McAmmond	950th NHL game	December 21, 2009
Martin Brodeur	600th NHL win	April 6, 2010

== Transactions ==
=== Trades ===
June 26, 2009	To Calgary Flames 1st-round pick (23rd overall) in 2009; 3rd-round pick (84th overall) in 2009	To New Jersey Devils 1st-round pick (20th overall) in 2009
June 30, 2009	To New York Islanders Tony Romano	To New Jersey Devils Ben Walter; Conditional pick in 2012 (Note: Condition not satisfied.)
February 4, 2010	To Atlanta Thrashers Johnny Oduya; Niclas Bergfors; Patrice Cormier; 1st-round pick in 2010; 2nd-round pick in 2010	To New Jersey Devils Ilya Kovalchuk; Anssi Salmela; 2nd-round pick in 2010
March 3, 2010	To Toronto Maple Leafs 5th-round pick in 2010	To New Jersey Devils Martin Skoula

=== Free agents acquired ===
Player	Former team	Contract terms
Ilkka Pikkarainen	HIFK	undisclosed
Yann Danis	New York Islanders	1 year, $550,000
Cory Murphy	Tampa Bay Lightning	undisclosed
Rob Niedermayer	Anaheim Ducks	1 year, $1 million

=== Free agents lost ===
Player	New team	Contract terms
Brian Gionta	Montreal Canadiens	5 years, $25 million
John Madden	Chicago Blackhawks	1 year, $2.75 million
Mike Rupp	Pittsburgh Penguins	2 years, $1.65 million
Scott Clemmensen	Florida Panthers	3 years, $3.6 million

=== Lost via waivers ===
Player	New team	Date claimed off waivers
Jay Leach	Montreal Canadiens	November 6, 2009

=== Lost via retirement ===
Player
Brendan Shanahan
Kevin Weekes
Bobby Holik

=== Player signings ===
Player	Contract terms
Pierre-Luc Letourneau-Leblond	undisclosed
Johnny Oduya	3 years, $10.5 million
Andy Greene	2 years, $1.475 million
Travis Zajac	4 years, $15.55 million
Brendan Shanahan	1 year, $1 million
Mattias Tedenby	undisclosed
Jacob Josefson	undisclosed
Eric Gelinas	undisclosed
Dan Kelly	undisclosed

== Draft picks ==
New Jersey's picks at the 2009 NHL entry draft in Montreal.

Round	Pick	Player	Position	Nationality	Club team
1	20 (from Calgary)	Jacob Josefson	C	Sweden	Djurgardens IF (Elitserien)
2	54	Eric Gelinas	D	Canada	Lewiston Maineiacs (QMJHL)
3	73 (from Minnesota)	Alexander Urbom	D	Sweden	Djurgardens IF (Elitserien)
4	114	Seth Helgeson	D	United States	Sioux City Musketeers (USHL)
5	144	Derek Rodwell	LW	Canada	Okotoks Oilers (AJHL)
6	174	Ashton Bernard	LW	Canada	Shawinigan Cataractes (QMJHL)
7	204	Curtis Gedig	D	Canada	Cowichan Valley Capitals (BCHL)

== Farm teams ==
The Lowell Devils of the American Hockey League and the Trenton Devils of the ECHL remain the New Jersey Devils' minor league affiliates for the 2009–10 season.

== See also ==
- 2009–10 NHL season
