= 2009–10 Toronto Maple Leafs season =

NHL hockey team season

2009–10 Toronto Maple Leafs
- Division: 5th Northeast
- Conference: 15th Eastern
- 2009–10 record: 30–38–14
- Home record: 18–17–6
- Road record: 12–21–8
- Goals for: 214
- Goals against: 267

Team information
- General manager: Brian Burke
- Coach: Ron Wilson
- Captain: Vacant
- Alternate captains: Francois Beauchemin; Tomas Kaberle; Mike Komisarek; Dion Phaneuf (Mar.–Apr.)
- Arena: Air Canada Centre
- Average attendance: 19,260 (102.5%)

Team leaders
- Goals: Phil Kessel (30)
- Assists: Tomas Kaberle (42)
- Points: Phil Kessel (55)
- Penalty minutes: Colton Orr (239)
- Plus/minus: Carl Gunnarsson (8)
- Wins: Jonas Gustavsson (16)
- Goals against average: Jean-Sebastien Giguere (2.49)

The 2009–10 Toronto Maple Leafs season was the franchise's 93rd, and their 83rd as the Maple Leafs. The Leafs had not qualified for the Stanley Cup playoffs since the 2003–04 season, and began the regular season with its worst start in franchise history by going winless in the first eight games. The team missed the playoffs for the fifth year in a row for the first time in franchise history. It was also the first time since the 1990–91 season that the team would finished last in their conference.

== Team business ==
The team moved to a new practice facility, the MasterCard Centre, from their former practice facility, the Lakeshore Lions Arena. Built next door to the old arena, the new facility has four ice sheets, allowing the Maple Leafs and their farm team the Toronto Marlies to practice simultaneously on separate sheets.

== Off-season ==
At the 2009 NHL entry draft, the Maple Leafs chose centre Nazem Kadri with their first round pick, seventh overall.

In free agency, the Maple Leafs signed two defencemen of note – Mike Komisarek of the Montreal Canadiens and Francois Beauchemin of the Anaheim Ducks, signing both to multiple-year deals. At the same time, defenceman Pavel Kubina was traded to the Atlanta Thrashers for fellow defenceman Garnet Exelby. The Leafs also signed free agents Colton Orr and Tim Brent.

After extensive talks, the Leafs were able to sign highly regarded Swedish free agent goaltender Jonas Gustavsson, who was considering offers from several NHL teams.

The Leafs dealt for Boston Bruins' forward Phil Kessel, trading two first round draft picks and a second round draft pick. Kessel started the season on the injured list as he was recovering from an off-season shoulder surgery.

== Pre-season ==
2009 Pre-season Game Log: 6–3–0 (Home: 3–2–0; Road: 3–1–0)
#	Date	Visitor	Score	Home	Attendance	Record	Points
1	September 16	Boston Bruins	3–2	Toronto Maple Leafs	16,872	0–1–0	0
2	September 17 (in London, ON)	Toronto Maple Leafs	4–0	Philadelphia Flyers	9,099	1–1–0	2
3	September 18	Toronto Maple Leafs	4–3	Pittsburgh Penguins	16,621	2–1–0	4
4	September 19	Philadelphia Flyers	5–4 (OT)	Toronto Maple Leafs	18,609	3–1–0	6
5	September 22	Pittsburgh Penguins	3–2 (SO)	Toronto Maple Leafs	18,910	4–1–0	8
6	September 23	Toronto Maple Leafs	2–3	Buffalo Sabres	11,008	4–2–0	8
7	September 25	Toronto Maple Leafs	5–4 (SO)	Detroit Red Wings	14,399	5–2–0	10
8	September 26	Detroit Red Wings	2–1	Toronto Maple Leafs	18,825	6–2–0	12
9	September 27	Buffalo Sabres	6–7	Toronto Maple Leafs	18,388	6–3–0	12

== Regular season ==
The Leafs got off to a slow start to the NHL season, with a record of 0–7–1, the worst start for the Leafs since the NHL formed in 1917. Additionally, the Leafs surrendered the first goal to their opposition in each of their first 11 games, and 17 of their first 19 games.

The Leafs struggled on the power play during the regular season, finishing 30th in power-play percentage, at just 13.97% (44 for 315). They also struggled on the penalty kill, allowing the most power-play goals in the League, with 73, and having the lowest penalty-kill percentage, at 74.65%.

=== Divisional standings ===
Northeast Division
		GP	W	L	OTL	GF	GA	Pts
**1**	**y – Buffalo Sabres**	**82**	**45**	**27**	**10**	**235**	**207**	**100**
**2**	**Ottawa Senators**	**82**	**44**	**32**	**6**	**225**	**238**	**94**
**3**	**Boston Bruins**	**82**	**39**	**30**	**13**	**206**	**200**	**91**
**4**	**Montreal Canadiens**	**82**	**39**	**33**	**10**	**217**	**223**	**88**
5	Toronto Maple Leafs	82	30	38	14	214	263	74

=== Conference standings ===
Eastern Conference
R		Div	GP	W	L	OTL	GF	GA	Pts
**1**	**p – Washington Capitals**	**SE**	**82**	**54**	**15**	**13**	**318**	**233**	121
**2**	**y – New Jersey Devils**	**AT**	**82**	**48**	**27**	**7**	**222**	**191**	103
**3**	**y – Buffalo Sabres**	**NE**	**82**	**45**	**27**	**10**	**235**	**207**	100
**4**	**Pittsburgh Penguins**	**AT**	**82**	**47**	**28**	**7**	**257**	**237**	101
**5**	**Ottawa Senators**	**NE**	**82**	**44**	**32**	**6**	**225**	**238**	94
**6**	**Boston Bruins**	**NE**	**82**	**39**	**30**	**13**	**206**	**200**	91
**7**	**Philadelphia Flyers**	**AT**	**82**	**41**	**35**	**6**	**236**	**225**	88
**8**	**Montreal Canadiens**	**NE**	**82**	**39**	**33**	**10**	**217**	**223**	88
8.5
9	New York Rangers	AT	82	38	33	11	222	218	87
10	Atlanta Thrashers	SE	82	35	34	13	234	256	83
11	Carolina Hurricanes	SE	82	35	37	10	230	256	80
12	Tampa Bay Lightning	SE	82	34	36	12	217	260	80
13	New York Islanders	AT	82	34	37	11	222	264	79
14	Florida Panthers	SE	82	32	37	13	208	244	77
15	Toronto Maple Leafs	NE	82	30	38	14	214	267	74

bold – Qualified for playoffs; y – Won division; p – Won Presidents' Trophy (and division)

AT – Atlantic Division, NE – Northeast Division, SE – Southeast Division

=== Game log ===
2009–10 Game Log
October: 1–7–4 (Home: 0–4–1; Road: 1–3–3)

Game	Date	Opponent	Score	Location	Attendance	Record	Points
1	October 1	Montreal Canadiens	3–4 (OT)	Air Canada Centre	19,617	0–0–1	1
2	October 3	@ Washington Capitals	4–6	Verizon Center	18,277	0–1–1	1
3	October 6	Ottawa Senators	1–2	Air Canada Centre	18,830	0–2–1	1
4	October 10	Pittsburgh Penguins	2–5	Air Canada Centre	19,374	0–3–1	1
5	October 12	@ New York Rangers	2–7	Madison Square Garden	18,200	0–4–1	1
6	October 13	Colorado Avalanche	1–4	Air Canada Centre	19,148	0–5–1	1
7	October 17	New York Rangers	1–4	Air Canada Centre	19,295	0–6–1	1
8	October 24	@ Vancouver Canucks	1–3	GM Place	18,810	0–7–1	1
9	October 26	@ Anaheim Ducks	6–3	Honda Center	14,291	1–7–1	3
10	October 28	@ Dallas Stars	3–4 (OT)	American Airlines Center	16,302	1–7–2	4
11	October 30	@ Buffalo Sabres	2–3 (OT)	HSBC Arena	18,300	1–7–3	5
12	October 31	@ Montreal Canadiens	4–5 (SO)	Bell Centre	21,273	1–7–4	6

November: 5–5–3 (Home: 2–3–2; Road: 3–2–1)

Game	Date	Opponent	Score	Location	Attendance	Record	Points
13	November 3	Tampa Bay Lightning	1–2 (OT)	Air Canada Centre	19,301	1–7–5	7
14	November 6	@ Carolina Hurricanes	3–2	RBC Center	14,164	2–7–5	9
15	November 7 †	Detroit Red Wings	5–1	Air Canada Centre	19,303	3–7–5	11
16	November 10	Minnesota Wild	2–5	Air Canada Centre	19,063	3–8–5	11
17	November 13	@ Chicago Blackhawks	2–3	United Center	21,036	3–9–5	11
18	November 14	Calgary Flames	2–5	Air Canada Centre	19,316	3–10–5	11
19	November 17	@ Ottawa Senators	2–3	Scotiabank Place	17,406	3–11–5	11
20	November 19	@ Carolina Hurricanes	5–6 (SO)	RBC Centre	13,502	3–11–6	12
21	November 21	Washington Capitals	2–1 (SO)	Air Canada Centre	19,455	4–11–6	14
22	November 23	New York Islanders	3–4 (OT)	Air Canada Centre	19,263	4–11–7	15
23	November 25	@ Tampa Bay Lightning	4–3	St. Pete Times Forum	15,333	5–11–7	17
24	November 27	@ Florida Panthers	6–4	BankAtlantic Center	16,101	6–11–7	19
25	November 30	Buffalo Sabres	0–3	Air Canada Centre	19,110	6–12–7	19

December: 8–6–2 (Home: 5–1–2; Road: 3–5–0)

Game	Date	Opponent	Score	Location	Attendance	Record	Points
26	December 1	@ Montreal Canadiens	3–0	Bell Centre	21,273	7–12–7	21
27	December 3	@ Columbus Blue Jackets	6–3	Nationwide Arena	13,825	8–12–7	23
28	December 5	@ Boston Bruins	2–7	TD Garden	17,565	8–13–7	23
29	December 7	Atlanta Thrashers	5–2	Air Canada Centre	19,050	9–13–7	25
30	December 9	New York Islanders	3–2	Air Canada Centre	19,102	10–13–7	27
31	December 10	@ Boston Bruins	2–5	TD Garden	17,565	10–14–7	27
32	December 12	Washington Capitals	6–3	Air Canada Centre	19,316	11–14–7	29
33	December 14	Ottawa Senators	3–2	Air Canada Centre	19,315	12–14–7	31
34	December 16	Phoenix Coyotes	3–6	Air Canada Centre	19,088	12–15–7	31
35	December 18	@ Buffalo Sabres	2–5	HSBC Arena	18,159	12–16–7	31
36	December 19	Boston Bruins	2–0	Air Canada Centre	19,101	13–16–7	33
37	December 21	Buffalo Sabres	2–3 (OT)	Air Canada Centre	19,235	13–16–8	34
38	December 23	@ New York Islanders	1–3	Nassau Veterans Memorial Coliseum	10,865	13–17–8	34
39	December 26	Montreal Canadiens	2–3 (OT)	Air Canada Centre	19,250	13–17–9	35
40	December 27	@ Pittsburgh Penguins	4–3	Mellon Arena	17,132	14–17–9	37
41	December 30	@ Edmonton Oilers	1–3	Rexall Place	16,839	14–18–9	37

January: 3–10–2 (Home: 2–4–0; Road: 1–6–2)

Game	Date	Opponent	Score	Location	Attendance	Record	Points
42	January 2	@ Calgary Flames	1–3	Pengrowth Saddledome	19,289	14–19–9	37
43	January 5	Florida Panthers	3–2	Air Canada Centre	18,984	15–19–9	39
44	January 6	@ Philadelphia Flyers	2–6	Wachovia Center	19,617	15–20–9	39
45	January 8	@ Buffalo Sabres	2–3	HSBC Arena	18,690	15–21–9	39
46	January 9	Pittsburgh Penguins	1–4	Air Canada Centre	19,567	15–22–9	39
47	January 12	Carolina Hurricanes	2–4	Air Canada Centre	19,120	15–23–9	39
48	January 14	Philadelphia Flyers	4–0	Air Canada Centre	19,370	16–23–9	41
49	January 15	@ Washington Capitals	1–6	Verizon Center	18,277	16–24–9	41
50	January 18	@ Nashville Predators	4–3	Sommet Center	16,501	17–24–9	43
51	January 19	@ Atlanta Thrashers	3–4	Philips Arena	10,208	17–25–9	43
52	January 21	@ Tampa Bay Lightning	2–3 (OT)	St. Pete Times Forum	13,691	17–25–10	44
53	January 23	@ Florida Panthers	0–2	BankAtlantic Center	18,087	17–26–10	44
54	January 26	Los Angeles Kings	3–5	Air Canada Centre	19,322	17–27–10	44
55	January 29	@ New Jersey Devils	4–5 (OT)	Prudential Center	15,536	17–27–11	45
56	January 30	Vancouver Canucks	3–5	Air Canada Centre	19,534	17–28–11	45

February: 2–3–0 (Home: 2–1–0; Road: 0–2–0)

Game	Date	Opponent	Score	Location	Attendance	Record	Points
57	February 2	New Jersey Devils	3–0	Air Canada Centre	19,326	18–28–11	47
58	February 5	@ New Jersey Devils	3–4	Prudential Center	15,204	18–29–11	47
59	February 6	Ottawa Senators	5–0	Air Canada Centre	19,426	19–29–11	49
60	February 8	San Jose Sharks	2–3	Air Canada Centre	19,460	19–30–11	49
61	February 12	@ St. Louis Blues	0–4	Scottrade Center	19,150	19–31–11	49

March: 9–5–2 (Home: 6–3–0; Road: 3–2–2)

Game	Date	Opponent	Score	Location	Attendance	Record	Points
62	March 2	Carolina Hurricanes	1–5	Air Canada Centre	19,096	19–32–11	49
63	March 4	@ Boston Bruins	2–3 (SO)	TD Garden	17,565	19–32–12	50
64	March 6	@ Ottawa Senators	2–1 (SO)	Scotiabank Place	20,036	20–32–12	52
65	March 7	@ Philadelphia Flyers	1–3	Wachovia Center	19,632	20–33–12	52
66	March 9	Boston Bruins	4–3 (OT)	Air Canada Centre	19,499	21–33–12	54
67	March 11	Tampa Bay Lightning	4–3 (OT)	Air Canada Centre	19,110	22–33–12	56
68	March 13	Edmonton Oilers	6–4	Air Canada Centre	19,243	23–33–12	58
69	March 14	@ New York Islanders	1–4	Nassau Veterans Memorial Coliseum	12,804	23–34–12	58
70	March 16	@ Ottawa Senators	4–1	Scotiabank Place	20,405	24–34–12	60
71	March 18	New Jersey Devils	2–1 (SO)	Air Canada Centre	19,183	25–34–12	62
72	March 20	Montreal Canadiens	3–2 (SO)	Air Canada Centre	19,538	26–34–12	64
73	March 23	Florida Panthers	1–4	Air Canada Centre	19,158	26–35–12	64
74	March 25	@ Atlanta Thrashers	2–1 (OT)	Philips Arena	14,148	27–35–12	66
75	March 27	New York Rangers	3–2 (OT)	Air Canada Centre	19,405	28–35–12	68
76	March 28	@ Pittsburgh Penguins	4–5 (SO)	Mellon Arena	17,104	28–35–13	69
77	March 30	Atlanta Thrashers	2–3	Air Canada Centre	19,079	28–36–13	69

April: 2–2–1 (Home: 1–1–1; Road: 1–1–0)

Game	Date	Opponent	Score	Location	Attendance	Record	Points
78	April 1	Buffalo Sabres	4–2	Air Canada Centre	19,090	29–36–13	71
79	April 3	Boston Bruins	1–2 (OT)	Air Canada Centre	19,273	29–36–14	72
80	April 6	Philadelphia Flyers	0–2	Air Canada Centre	19,366	29–37–14	72
81	April 7	@ New York Rangers	1–5	Madison Square Garden	18,200	29–38–14	72
82	April 10	@ Montreal Canadiens	4–3 (OT)	Bell Centre	21,273	30–38–14	74

† Hockey Hall of Fame Game
Schedule

== Playoffs ==
The Toronto Maple Leafs were trying to achieve their first qualification since the 2003–04 NHL season, however they were mathematically eliminated after their 77th game. They were the first team eliminated in the Eastern Conference. Currently, only the Florida Panthers have failed to qualify for the playoffs for more consecutive years.

== Player statistics ==
Final stats

=== Skaters ===
Regular season
Player	GP	G	A	Pts	+/-	PIM
Phil Kessel	70	30	25	55	−8	21
Tomas Kaberle	82	7	42	49	−16	24
Alexei Ponikarovsky^{‡}	61	19	22	41	5	44
Matt Stajan^{‡}	55	16	25	41	−3	30
Nikolai Kulemin	78	16	20	36	0	16
Mikhail Grabovski	59	10	25	35	3	10
Niklas Hagman^{‡}	55	20	13	33	−3	23
Lee Stempniak^{‡}	62	14	16	30	−10	18
Tyler Bozak	37	8	19	27	−5	6
Jason Blake^{‡}	56	10	16	26	−4	26
Ian White^{‡}	56	9	17	26	1	39
Francois Beauchemin	82	5	21	26	−13	33
John Mitchell	60	6	17	23	−7	31
Luke Schenn	79	5	12	17	2	50
Carl Gunnarsson	43	3	12	15	8	10
Viktor Stalberg	40	9	5	14	−13	30
Jeff Finger	39	2	8	10	−11	20
Dion Phaneuf^{†}	26	2	8	10	−2	34
Rickard Wallin	60	2	7	9	−7	20
Wayne Primeau	59	3	5	8	−1	35
Jamal Mayers^{‡}	44	2	6	8	−5	78
Christian Hanson	31	2	5	7	−2	16
Colton Orr	82	4	2	6	−4	239
Luca Caputi^{†}	19	1	5	6	0	10
Fredrik Sjostrom^{†}	19	2	3	5	−4	4
Garnet Exelby	51	1	3	4	−8	73
Mike Komisarek	34	0	4	4	−9	40
Jamie Lundmark^{†}	15	1	2	3	−1	16
Jay Rosehill	15	1	1	2	−2	67
Tim Brent	1	0	0	0	0	0
Andre Deveaux	1	0	0	0	−1	0
Nazem Kadri	1	0	0	0	−1	0
Brayden Irwin	2	0	0	0	0	2
Jiri Tlusty^{‡}	2	0	0	0	−2	0

=== Goaltenders ===
Regular season
Player	GP	GS	TOI	W	L	OT	GA	GAA	SA	SV%	SO	G	A	PIM
Jonas Gustavsson	42	39	2340	16	15	9	112	2.87	1146	.902	1	0	2	2
Vesa Toskala^{‡}	26	23	1393	7	12	3	85	3.66	676	.874	1	0	0	4
Jean-Sebastien Giguere^{†}	15	15	915	6	7	2	38	2.49	451	.916	2	0	0	0
Joey MacDonald^{‡}	6	5	319	1	4	0	17	3.20	157	.892	0	0	0	0

^{†}Denotes player spent time with another team before joining Maple Leafs. Stats reflect time with Maple Leafs only.
^{‡}Traded mid-season.
Bold/italics denotes franchise record.

== Awards ==
Regular Season
Player	Award	Awarded
Tomas Kaberle	NHL First Star of the Week	November 2, 2009
Niklas Hagman	NHL Third Star of the Week	November 30, 2009
Jean-Sebastien Giguere	NHL Second Star of the Week	February 8, 2010

== Transactions ==
The Maple Leafs have been involved in the following transactions during the 2009–10 season.

=== Trades ===
Date	Details
July 1, 2009	To Toronto Maple Leafs Garnet Exelby; Colin Stuart	To Atlanta Thrashers Pavel Kubina; Tim Stapleton
July 27, 2009	To Toronto Maple Leafs Wayne Primeau; 2nd-round pick in 2011	To Calgary Flames Anton Stralman; Colin Stuart; 7th-round pick in 2012
August 10, 2009	To Toronto Maple Leafs Conditional 6th-round pick in 2011 (Note: Condition satisfied.)	To Anaheim Ducks Justin Pogge
September 6, 2009	To Toronto Maple Leafs 2nd-round pick in 2010	To Chicago Blackhawks 2nd-round pick in 2011; 3rd-round pick in 2011
September 18, 2009	To Toronto Maple Leafs Phil Kessel	To Boston Bruins 1st-round pick in 2010; 1st-round pick in 2011; 2nd-round pick in 2010
December 3, 2009	To Toronto Maple Leafs Philippe Paradis	To Carolina Hurricanes Jiri Tlusty
January 31, 2010	To Toronto Maple Leafs Dion Phaneuf; Fredrik Sjostrom; Keith Aulie	To Calgary Flames Matt Stajan; Jamal Mayers; Niklas Hagman; Ian White
January 31, 2010	To Toronto Maple Leafs Jean-Sebastien Giguere	To Anaheim Ducks Vesa Toskala; Jason Blake
March 2, 2010	To Toronto Maple Leafs Luca Caputi; Martin Skoula	To Pittsburgh Penguins Alexei Ponikarovsky
March 3, 2010	To Toronto Maple Leafs 5th-round pick in 2010	To New Jersey Devils Martin Skoula
March 3, 2010	To Toronto Maple Leafs Matt Jones; 4th-round pick in 2010; 7th-round pick in 2010	To Phoenix Coyotes Lee Stempniak
March 3, 2010	To Toronto Maple Leafs 7th-round pick in 2011	To Anaheim Ducks Joey MacDonald
March 3, 2010	To Toronto Maple Leafs Chris Peluso	To Pittsburgh Penguins 6th-round pick in 2010

=== Free agents acquired ===
Player	Former team	Contract terms
Mike Komisarek	Montreal Canadiens	5 years, $22.5 million
Colton Orr	New York Rangers	4 years, $4 million
Jay Rosehill	Toronto Marlies	2 years
Tim Brent	Chicago Blackhawks	1 year
Richard Greenop	Chicago Blackhawks	3-year entry-level contract
Francois Beauchemin	Anaheim Ducks	3 years, $11.4 million
Jonas Gustavsson	Farjestad BK	1 year, $900,000
Rickard Wallin	Farjestad BK	1 year
Joey MacDonald	New York Islanders	1 year
Brayden Irwin	University of Vermont	2-year entry-level contract

=== Free agents lost ===
Player	New team	Contract terms
Jaime Sifers	Minnesota Wild	1 year
Jay Harrison	Carolina Hurricanes	1 year, $500K 2-way contract
Kris Newbury	Detroit Red Wings	1 year, 2-way contract
Jeremy Williams	Detroit Red Wings	1 year, 2-way contract
Martin Gerber	Atlant Moscow Oblast	1 year
Jeff Hamilton	HC Lugano	1 year
Ryan Hollweg	Phoenix Coyotes	1 year
Brad May	Detroit Red Wings	1 year, $500K

=== Claimed via waivers ===
Player	Former team	Date claimed off waivers
Jamie Lundmark	Calgary Flames	February 13, 2010

=== Lost via waivers ===
Player	New team	Date claimed off waivers

=== Lost via retirement ===
Player
Olaf Kolzig
Curtis Joseph

=== Player signings ===
Player	Contract terms
Mikhail Grabovski	3 years, $8.7 million
Nazem Kadri	3-year entry-level contract
Ben Ondrus	1 year
Ryan Hamilton	1 year
Andre Deveaux	1 year
Darryl Boyce	2 years
Alex Foster	1 year
Justin Pogge	1 year, $605,000
Phil Kessel	5 years, $27 million
Jesse Blacker	3-year entry-level contract
Jonas Gustavsson	2 years, $2.7 million contract extension

== Draft picks ==
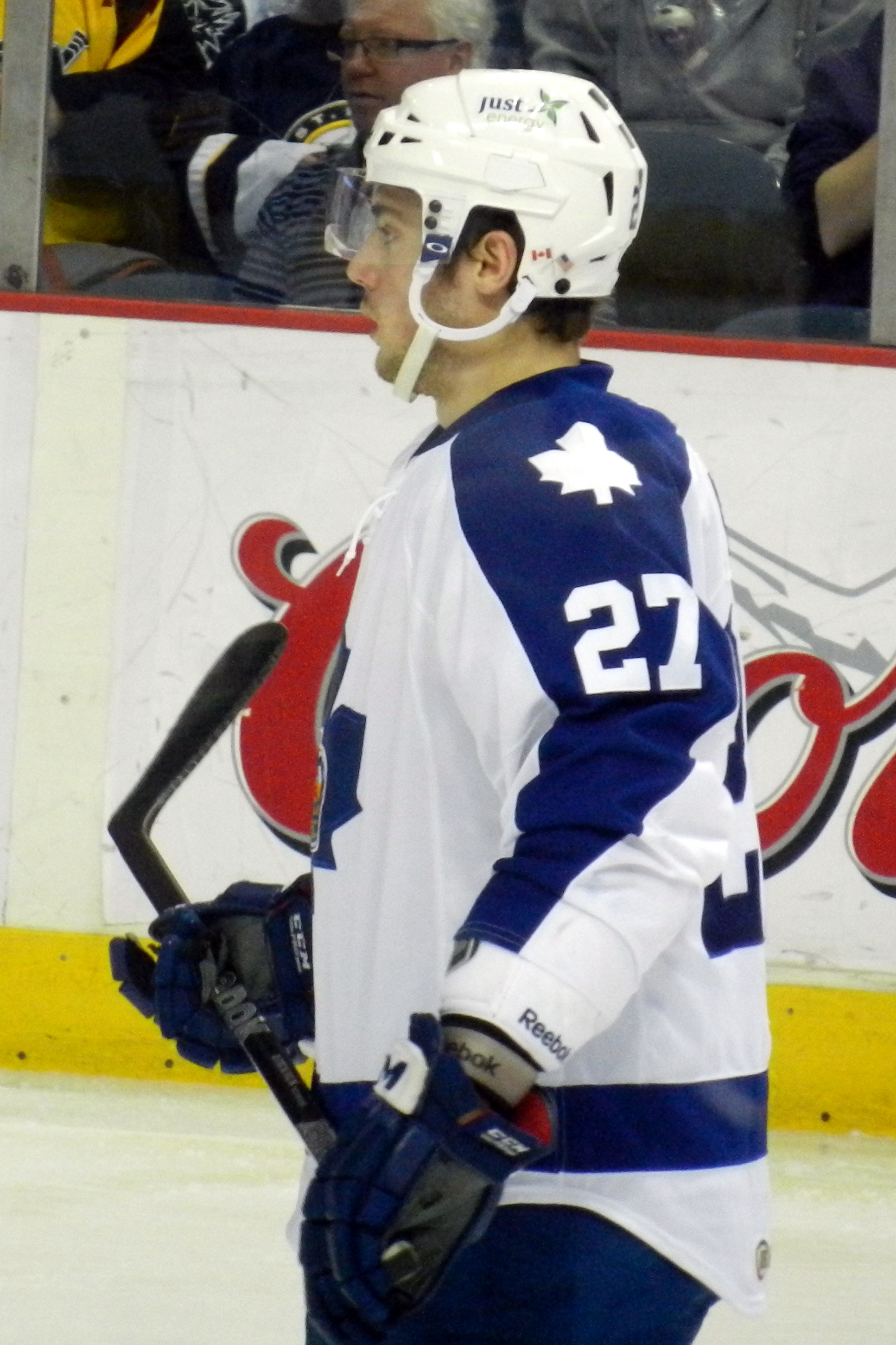
Jesse Blacker was a Maple Leafs second pick in round two

Toronto's picks at the 2009 NHL entry draft in Montreal, Quebec.

Round	Pick	Player	Position	Nationality	Team (League)
1	7	Nazem Kadri	C	Canada	London Knights (OHL)
2	50 (from NY Rangers)	Kenny Ryan	RW	United States	Boston College (Hockey East)
2	58 (from Carolina via Edmonton and Buffalo)	Jesse Blacker	D	Canada	Windsor Spitfires (OHL)
3	68	Jamie Devane	LW	Canada	Plymouth Whalers (OHL)
4	118 (From Carolina via Tampa Bay)	Forfeited because of Jonas Frogren contract			
5	128	Eric Knodel	D	United States	Philadelphia Jr. Flyers (AYHL)
6	158	Jerry D'Amigo	RW	United States	Rensselaer Polytechnic Institute (ECAC)
7	188	Barron Smith	(D)	United States	Peterborough Petes (OHL)

== See also ==
- 2009–10 NHL season

== Farm teams ==
- The Maple Leafs continue their affiliation with the Toronto Marlies of the American Hockey League and the Reading Royals of the ECHL.
