= Ryan Hollweg =

American ice hockey player (born 1983)

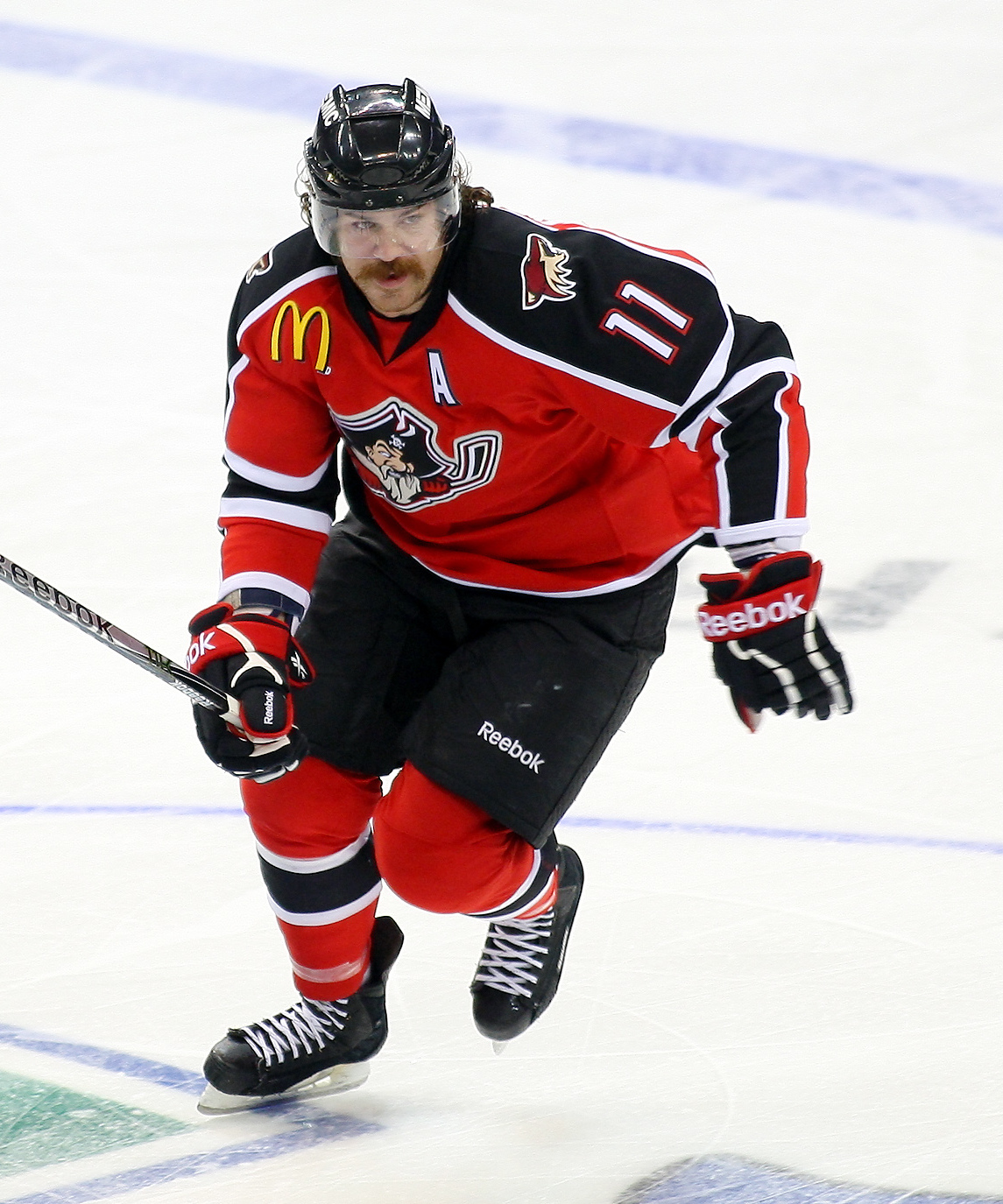
- Hollweg with the Portland Pirates in 2011
- Born: April 23, 1983 (age 43) Downey, California, U.S.
- Height: 5 ft 11 in (180 cm)
- Weight: 212 lb (96 kg; 15 st 2 lb)
- Position: Left wing
- Shot: Left
- Played for: New York Rangers; Toronto Maple Leafs; Phoenix Coyotes; HC Škoda Plzeň
- NHL draft: 238th overall, 2001; New York Rangers
- Playing career: 2005–2018

Ryan Alexander Hollweg (born April 23, 1983) is an American former professional ice hockey forward. He finished his career with HC Škoda Plzeň in the Czech Extraliga (Czech).

== Playing career ==
As the son of a Brazilian father of German descent and Canadian mother, Hollweg chose hockey over soccer. Even as a young boy, he assumed that someday he would be a professional hockey player. Because his Southern California hometown did not have a hockey program, his mother would drive him to neighboring cities to attend hockey clinics. He played in the 1996 Quebec International Pee-Wee Hockey Tournament with the Team California minor ice hockey team. He left Downey at 14 to play junior hockey in British Columbia, and was impressive in scoring 54 points in 58 games in 1998–99 for the Langley Hornets (BCHL). In 1999, he was drafted #1 by the Medicine Hat Tigers (Western Hockey League). There, he was known as both a scorer and a tough player, even winning Player of the Week honors twice in his four seasons.

The 5'11", 212-pounder was drafted by the New York Rangers in the eighth round (238th overall) of the 2001 NHL entry draft. Ex Rangers coach Tom Renney, who was director of player personnel at the time, states that although he had doubts about Hollweg's small size, his heart was the difference. "You want to give him a try. You just don't discount the heart and the character of a guy like that. Because these kinds of people will themselves into those opportunities."

Playing with the Medicine Hat Tigers in the WHL, Hollweg missed most of the 2002–03 season due to a severe concussion, but bounced back to score 57 points in 2003–04. He spent 2004–05 with the Hartford Wolf Pack (AHL), and amassed 239 penalty minutes while earning a reputation as a gritty forechecker and occasional fighter. He did not make the New York Rangers team at training camp in 2005 but in November, after 7 games in Hartford was called up to the team, where he was part of the forechecking 4th line with Blair Betts and Colton Orr. Ryan has achieved all of these accomplishments while suffering from asthma since the age of 5.

On March 8, 2007, at 13:25 of the third period of a game between the Rangers and the New York Islanders, Ryan Hollweg delivered a check on Chris Simon, sending the sizeable forward into the boards head-first. After recovering, Simon proceeded to intentionally hit Hollweg in the jaw with the middle of his stick. Hollweg later recovered and left the ice under his own power. He received two stitches on his chin and returned to the game later in the third period. Subsequently, Simon was assessed a 25-game suspension for his actions, one of the longest suspensions in hockey.

On January 10, 2008, Ryan Hollweg had the first two-goal game of his career against the Philadelphia Flyers at Madison Square Garden. He scored his first goal of the 2007–2008 season at 4:43 of the first period and added his second goal at 7:42 of the first period. Hollweg had not scored a goal since February 9, 2007.

On February 3, 2008, Hollweg was assessed a five-minute penalty and ejected from a game against the Montreal Canadiens after intentionally checking left wing Sergei Kostitsyn head first into the boards. The incident occurred after Hollweg was hit with an elbow by Canadien Alexei Kovalev, which was missed by referees.

On July 14, 2008, Hollweg was acquired by the Toronto Maple Leafs in exchange for a 5th round pick in the 2009 NHL entry draft. In the 2008-09 season, on October 6, 2008, Hollweg was suspended by the NHL for 2 games because he was assessed a boarding major on young defenceman Alex Pietrangelo in a game against the St. Louis Blues. Because he had two boarding majors last season, there is a provision for an automatic two-game suspension as a result of the accumulation. On October 13, 2008, in his first game back from the previous suspension, Hollweg was issued a five-minute major penalty for boarding followed by a game misconduct after checking a St. Louis Blues player into the boards from behind early in the second period. Done while the Leafs were ahead 3-1, the play was seen as a momentum-breaker. The Blues scored twice on the ensuing powerplay and eventually won in the shootout, 5-4. Spectators were heard booing the hit and cheering Hollweg's ejection. On February 13, 2009, Hollweg was placed on waivers by the Maple Leafs. After clearing waivers a day later, he was sent down to their AHL farm club, the Toronto Marlies for the remainder of the year.

Hollweg was signed as a free agent by the Phoenix Coyotes for the 2009-10 season. He appeared in 3 games over the course of the year with the Coyotes however was primarily assigned to AHL affiliate, the San Antonio Rampage.

After an additional season within the Coyotes organization, Hollweg left the NHL and signed a contract abroad with Czech club, HC Plzeň of the Czech Extraliga on July 30, 2012.

== Coaching career ==
Following retirement, Hollweg returned to British Columbia, where he took coaching jobs across a number of different teams including those in youth and collegiate leagues. Perhaps most notable are his stints in the BCHL, first as an associate coach with the Coquitlam Express in 2020-21, later as associate head coach of the Langley Rivermen in 2024-25, and most recently as an assistant/associate coach with the Vernon Vipers.

== Career statistics ==
=== Regular season and playoffs ===
| | | | Regular season | | | | | Playoffs |
| Season | Team | League | GP | G | A | Pts | PIM | GP | G | A | Pts | PIM |
|---|---|---|---|---|---|---|---|---|---|---|---|---|
| 1997–98 | Grandview Steelers | PIJHL | 41 | 23 | 27 | 50 | 135 | — | — | — | — | — |
| 1998–99 | Langley Hornets | BCHL | 58 | 14 | 40 | 54 | 187 | 4 | 2 | 4 | 6 | 6 |
| 1999–2000 | Medicine Hat Tigers | WHL | 54 | 19 | 27 | 46 | 107 | — | — | — | — | — |
| 2000–01 | Medicine Hat Tigers | WHL | 65 | 19 | 39 | 58 | 125 | — | — | — | — | — |
| 2001–02 | Medicine Hat Tigers | WHL | 58 | 30 | 40 | 70 | 121 | — | — | — | — | — |
| 2001–02 | Hartford Wolf Pack | AHL | 8 | 1 | 1 | 2 | 2 | 9 | 0 | 2 | 2 | 19 |
| 2002–03 | Medicine Hat Tigers | WHL | 4 | 1 | 1 | 2 | 8 | — | — | — | — | — |
| 2003–04 | Medicine Hat Tigers | WHL | 52 | 25 | 32 | 57 | 117 | 20 | 6 | 9 | 15 | 22 |
| 2004–05 | Hartford Wolf Pack | AHL | 73 | 8 | 6 | 14 | 239 | 6 | 1 | 0 | 1 | 9 |
| 2005–06 | Hartford Wolf Pack | AHL | 7 | 2 | 1 | 3 | 11 | — | — | — | — | — |
| 2005–06 | New York Rangers | NHL | 52 | 2 | 3 | 5 | 84 | 4 | 0 | 1 | 1 | 19 |
| 2006–07 | New York Rangers | NHL | 78 | 1 | 2 | 3 | 131 | 2 | 0 | 0 | 0 | 2 |
| 2007–08 | New York Rangers | NHL | 70 | 2 | 2 | 4 | 96 | 8 | 0 | 0 | 0 | 2 |
| 2008–09 | Toronto Maple Leafs | NHL | 25 | 0 | 2 | 2 | 38 | — | — | — | — | — |
| 2008–09 | Toronto Marlies | AHL | 28 | 2 | 1 | 3 | 34 | 6 | 0 | 0 | 0 | 20 |
| 2009–10 | San Antonio Rampage | AHL | 53 | 4 | 6 | 10 | 93 | — | — | — | — | — |
| 2010–11 | San Antonio Rampage | AHL | 63 | 9 | 8 | 17 | 125 | — | — | — | — | — |
| 2010–11 | Phoenix Coyotes | NHL | 3 | 0 | 0 | 0 | 0 | — | — | — | — | — |
| 2011–12 | Portland Pirates | AHL | 43 | 0 | 5 | 5 | 123 | — | — | — | — | — |
| 2012–13 | HC Škoda Plzeň | ELH | 40 | 1 | 1 | 2 | 130 | 12 | 0 | 0 | 0 | 39 |
| 2013–14 | HC Škoda Plzeň | ELH | 20 | 3 | 1 | 4 | 51 | — | — | — | — | — |
| 2014–15 | HC Škoda Plzeň | ELH | 38 | 2 | 1 | 3 | 112 | 4 | 1 | 0 | 1 | 0 |
| 2015–16 | HC Škoda Plzeň | ELH | 24 | 0 | 2 | 2 | 32 | 11 | 0 | 0 | 0 | 16 |
| 2017–18 | HC Škoda Plzeň | ELH | 41 | 2 | 2 | 4 | 71 | 10 | 2 | 0 | 2 | 16 |
| AHL totals | | | 275 | 26 | 28 | 54 | 627 | 21 | 1 | 2 | 3 | 48 |
| NHL totals | | | 228 | 5 | 9 | 14 | 349 | 14 | 0 | 1 | 1 | 23 |
| ELH totals | | | 163 | 8 | 7 | 15 | 396 | 37 | 3 | 0 | 3 | 71 |

=== International ===
| Year | Team | Event | Result | GP | G | A | Pts | PIM |
|---|---|---|---|---|---|---|---|---|
| 2000 | United States | U17 | 4th | 6 | 1 | 1 | 2 | 6 |
| 2000 | United States | U18 | 2nd place, silver medalist(s) | 3 | 1 | 0 | 1 | 4 |
| 2002 | United States | WJC | 5th | 7 | 2 | 3 | 5 | 33 |
| Junior totals | | | | 16 | 4 | 4 | 8 | 43 |

== Awards ==
- WHL Player of the week (March 2000, January 2004)
- Czech ELH title with HC Škoda Plzeň (2013)
