= Curtis Gedig =

Canadian-German ice hockey player

Curtis Gedig (born September 14, 1991) is a Canadian-German former professional ice hockey defenceman. He was selected 204th overall by the New Jersey Devils in the 2009 NHL Entry Draft, won the 2010 RBC Cup with the Vernon Vipers, and played NCAA Division I hockey at Ohio State University before a professional career in North America and Europe. As of 2026, he works as a real estate agent in Kelowna, British Columbia.

== Career ==
Gedig was born in Penticton, British Columbia. From 2008 to 2010, Gedig played for the Merritt Centennials, Cowichan Valley Capitals and Vernon Vipers in the BCHL. He was selected by the New Jersey Devils (round 7, 204th overall) in the 2009 NHL draft.

Gedig enrolled at Ohio State University in 2010 and served as captain his junior and senior year. With the Vernon Vipers, Gedig won the 2010 RBC Cup, Canada's national Junior A hockey championship. He was named 2011 Rookie of the Year and 2013 Best Defensive Player by his Ohio State teammates.

In the 2014-15 season, he saw the ice in 30 games for ECHL's Colorado Eagles, tallying three goals and 14 assists. Gedig landed his first job overseas in June 2015, when putting pen to paper on a one-year deal with Stjernen, a member of Norway's GET-Liga. He exploded statistically in the 2015-16 season, scoring 26 goals in 49 contests for Stjernen while dishing out 29 assists. His production led all defensemen in scoring and goals scored. In a bid to help their team re-sign Gedig for a second season, the Stjernen fans started raising money, but the Penticton native eventually opted to accept an offer from Switzerland. In March 2016, Gedig signed a two-year deal with EHC Olten of the National League B (NLB), but parted company with the club at the conclusion of the 2016-17 campaign.

In June 2017, he signed with the Stavanger Oilers of the Norwegian GET-Liga. In May 2018, Gedig signed a deal with the Fischtown Pinguins of the German DEL. He left after the 2018-19 campaign. On December 28, 2019, he was signed by the Kassel Huskies of the German DEL2.

The 2010 Vernon Vipers championship team with Gedig are scheduled to be inducted into the BC Hockey Hall of Fame on July 11, 2026.

== Post-playing career ==
After retiring from professional hockey, Gedig became a licensed real estate agent in Kelowna and Central Okanagan, British Columbia.
