= Blair Betts =

Canadian ice hockey player (born 1980)

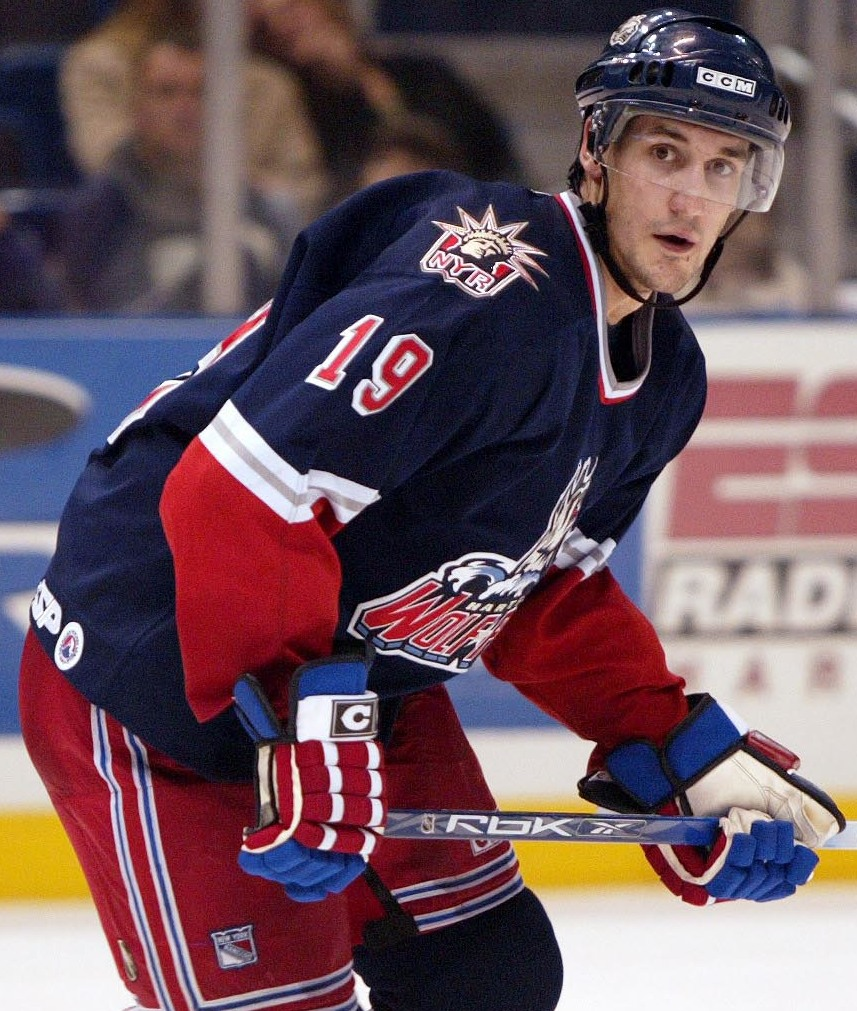
- Betts with the Hartford Wolf Pack in 2004
- Born: February 16, 1980 (age 46) Edmonton, Alberta, Canada
- Height: 6 ft 3 in (191 cm)
- Weight: 210 lb (95 kg; 15 st 0 lb)
- Position: Centre
- Shot: Left
- Played for: Calgary Flames; New York Rangers; Philadelphia Flyers
- NHL draft: 33rd overall, 1998; Calgary Flames
- Playing career: 2000–2011

Blair Betts (born February 16, 1980) is a Canadian former professional ice hockey centre who played nine seasons in the National Hockey League (NHL) for the Calgary Flames, New York Rangers, and Philadelphia Flyers. Betts was born in Edmonton, Alberta, but grew up in Sherwood Park, Alberta.

== Playing career ==
Betts was drafted by the Calgary Flames in the 1998 NHL entry draft in the second round, 33rd overall.

During the 2006–07 season, Betts found success on the Rangers checking fourth line. He was mostly paired with Colton Orr and Ryan Hollweg. Betts was also a key factor on the penalty kill. He was one of the Rangers most consistent faceoff men with 52.3 percent of faceoffs won. He was first on the team with 1,186 faceoffs taken. He was also sixth on the team, first among forwards, with 98 blocked shots and led the team with 276 minutes and 42 seconds of short-handed time on the ice. In the 2008–09 season, Betts served as one of the Rangers' alternate captains while Scott Gomez was injured.

TSN hockey analyst Pierre McGuire declared Betts "the most underrated player in the league".

After becoming a free agent, Betts was invited to the 2009 Philadelphia Flyers training camp. The Flyers signed him to a one-year contract on October 1, 2009. The Flyers later signed Betts to a two-year contract extension on February 12, 2010. On October 5, 2011, The Montreal Canadiens picked Betts up off waivers from the Flyers. However, on October 9, 2011, the Montreal Canadiens cancelled the waiver claim on Betts and returned him to the Philadelphia Flyers, as he had failed his physical. Betts missed the entire 2011–12 season and subsequently retired after the season.

== Career statistics ==
=== Regular season and playoffs ===
			Regular season					Playoffs
Season	Team	League	GP	G	A	Pts	PIM	GP	G	A	Pts	PIM
1996–97	Prince George Cougars	WHL	58	12	18	30	19	15	2	2	4	6
1997–98	Prince George Cougars	WHL	71	35	41	76	38	11	4	6	10	8
1998–99	Prince George Cougars	WHL	42	20	22	42	39	7	3	2	5	8
1999–2000	Prince George Cougars	WHL	44	24	35	59	38	13	11	11	22	6
2000–01	Saint John Flames	AHL	75	13	15	28	28	19	2	3	5	4
2001–02	Saint John Flames	AHL	67	20	29	49	10	—	—	—	—	—
2001–02	Calgary Flames	NHL	6	1	0	1	2	—	—	—	—	—
2002–03	Saint John Flames	AHL	19	6	7	13	2	—	—	—	—	—
2002–03	Calgary Flames	NHL	9	1	3	4	0	—	—	—	—	—
2003–04	Calgary Flames	NHL	20	1	2	3	10	—	—	—	—	—
2004–05	Hartford Wolf Pack	AHL	16	5	4	9	4	—	—	—	—	—
2005–06	New York Rangers	NHL	66	8	2	10	24	4	1	1	2	2
2006–07	New York Rangers	NHL	82	9	4	13	24	10	0	0	0	4
2007–08	New York Rangers	NHL	75	2	5	7	20	8	0	0	0	2
2008–09	New York Rangers	NHL	81	6	4	10	16	6	0	0	0	0
2009–10	Philadelphia Flyers	NHL	63	8	10	18	14	23	1	1	2	4
2010–11	Philadelphia Flyers	NHL	75	5	7	12	8	11	0	0	0	0
AHL totals			177	44	55	99	48	19	2	3	5	4
NHL totals			477	41	37	78	118	62	2	2	4	12

=== International ===
Medal record

Representing Canada

Ice hockey

World Junior Championships
Silver medal – second place	1999 Canada	

Year	Team	Event	Result	GP	G	A	Pts	PIM
1999	Canada	WJC	2nd place, silver medalist(s)	5	0	0	0	2
Junior totals				5	0	0	0	2

== Awards and honours ==
Award	Year
WHL
CHL Top Prospects Game	1998
AHL
Calder Cup (Saint John Flames)	2001
