= Jeremy Duchesne =

American-born Canadian ice hockey goaltender

- Born: October 17, 1986 (age 40) Silver Spring, Maryland, U.S
- Height: 6 ft 0 in (183 cm)
- Weight: 201 lb (91 kg; 14 st 5 lb)
- Position: Goaltender
- Caught: Left
- Played for: Philadelphia Flyers
- NHL draft: 119th overall, 2005; Philadelphia Flyers
- Playing career: 2007–2016

Jeremy Duchesne (born October 17, 1986) is an American-born Canadian former professional ice hockey goaltender who played one game in the National Hockey League (NHL). His father is the late Gaetan Duchesne. He was born in the Washington, D.C. area suburbs, while his father played for the Washington Capitals, but grew up in Quebec City, Quebec.

== Playing career ==
Duchesne was selected 119th overall in the 2005 NHL entry draft by the Philadelphia Flyers. He made his NHL debut on April 1, 2010 with the Flyers against the New York Islanders, allowing one goal in 17 minutes of action after relieving Brian Boucher in the third period.

== Career statistics ==
			Regular season									Playoffs
Season	Team	League	GP	W	L	T/OT	MIN	GA	SO	GAA	SV%	GP	W	L	MIN	GA	SO	GAA	SV%
2003–04	Victoriaville Tigres	QMJHL	17	3	8	1	870	60	0	4.14	.887	—	—	—	—	—	—	—	—
2004–05	Victoriaville Tigres	QMJHL	15	2	9	0	711	41	2	3.46	.893	—	—	—	—	—	—	—	—
2004–05	Halifax Mooseheads	QMJHL	18	12	0	2	921	23	3	1.50	.942	12	8	4	723	33	1	2.74	.907
2005–06	Halifax Mooseheads	QMJHL	55	25	29	0	3175	185	4	3.50	.896	11	5	6	626	34	1	3.26	.904
2006–07	Halifax Mooseheads	QMJHL	28	12	15	0	1580	97	1	3.68	.891	—	—	—	—	—	—	—	—
2006–07	Val-d'Or Foreurs	QMJHL	24	13	10	0	1356	66	1	2.92	.904	18	11	7	1157	56	0	2.90	.905
2007–08	Dayton Bombers	ECHL	31	13	13	5	1838	91	1	2.97	.903	—	—	—	—	—	—	—	—
2007–08	Philadelphia Phantoms	AHL	2	1	0	0	80	6	0	4.50	.800	—	—	—	—	—	—	—	—
2008–09	Mississippi Sea Wolves	ECHL	14	3	7	2	718	57	1	4.77	.878	—	—	—	—	—	—	—	—
2008–09	South Carolina Stingrays	ECHL	5	2	2	0	206	17	0	4.94	.845	—	—	—	—	—	—	—	—
2009–10	Kalamazoo Wings	ECHL	24	9	4	5	1162	62	1	3.20	.904	—	—	—	—	—	—	—	—
2009–10	Adirondack Phantoms	AHL	5	1	4	0	263	13	1	2.97	.898	—	—	—	—	—	—	—	—
2009–10	Philadelphia Flyers	NHL	1	0	0	0	17	1	0	3.59	.750	—	—	—	—	—	—	—	—
2010–11	Saint-Georges CRS Express	LNAH	22	16	3	2	1309	62	1	2.84	.911	—	—	—	—	—	—	—	—
2011–12	St. Georges Cool 103.5 FM	LNAH	31	15	10	4	1771	105	0	3.56	.850	—	—	—	—	—	—	—	—
2012–13	St. Georges Cool 103.5 FM	LNAH	35	17	14	3	2059	118	0	3.44	.898	2	—	—	—	—	—	4.52	.860
2013–14	St. Georges Cool 103.5 FM	LNAH	16	5	10	1	953	64	0	4.03	.875	3	—	—	—	—	—	2.61	.903
2015–16	Jonquière Marquis	LNAH	2	1	0	1	123	6	0	2.94	.905	—	—	—	—	—	—	—	—
NHL totals			1	0	0	0	17	1	0	3.59	.750	—	—	—	—	—	—	—	—

== See also ==
- List of players who played only one game in the NHL
