= 2015 Spengler Cup =

2015 Spengler Cup Davos, Switzerland
Tournament details
- Host country: Switzerland
- Venue(s): Vaillant Arena
- Dates: 26 – 31 December 2015
- Teams: 6

Final positions
- Champions: Team Canada (13th title)
- Runner-up: (Switzerland) HC Lugano

Tournament statistics
- Games played: 11
- Goals scored: 72 (6.55 per game)
- Attendance: 69,300 (6,300 per game)
- Scoring leader(s): (Sweden) Linus Klasen (7 pts)

Official website
- Spengler Cup

The 2015 Spengler Cup was an ice hockey competition held in Davos, Switzerland from December 26 to December 31, 2015. All matches were played at HC Davos's home known as Vaillant Arena. Six competing teams were split into two groups of three (in the round-robin series). The two groups, named Torriani and Cattini, are named after legendary Swiss hockey players Richard 'Bibi' Torriani and the Cattini brothers, Hans and Ferdinand.

== Teams participating ==
The list of teams that participated in the tournament are as listed.

- (Switzerland) HC Davos (host)
- Team Canada
- (Russia) Avtomobilist Yekaterinburg
- (Switzerland) HC Lugano
- (Germany) Adler Mannheim
- (Finland) Jokerit

== Group stage ==
=== Key ===
- W (regulation win) – 3 pts.
- OTW (overtime/shootout win) – 2 pts.
- OTL (overtime/shootout loss) – 1 pt.
- L (regulation loss) – 0 pts.

=== Group Torriani ===
| Team | Pld | W | OTW | OTL | L | GF | GA | GD | Pts | Qualification |
|---|---|---|---|---|---|---|---|---|---|---|
| (Switzerland) HC Lugano | 2 | 1 | 0 | 0 | 1 | 10 | 9 | +1 | 3 | Clinched group |
| (Finland) Jokerit | 2 | 1 | 0 | 0 | 1 | 9 | 9 | 0 | 3 | Quarterfinal berth |
| (Germany) Adler Mannheim | 2 | 1 | 0 | 0 | 1 | 8 | 9 | −1 | 3 | Quarterfinal berth |

All times are local (UTC+1).

| 26 December 2015; 15:00 | HC Lugano (Switzerland) | 6 – 3 (0 – 2, 3 – 1, 3 – 0) | (Germany) Adler Mannheim | Vaillant Arena; Attendance: 6,300 |

Game reference

Elvis Merzļikins
Goalies
Dennis Endras
Referees:
(Finland) Miko Kaukokari
(Switzerland) Tobias Wehrli
Linesmen:
(Switzerland) Cedric Borga
(Switzerland) Balázs Kovács

| | 0 – 1 | Raedeke (Metropolit, Eminger) – 4:28 |
| | 0 – 2 | MacMurchy (Hecht, Wilson) – 13:51 |
| | 0 – 3 | MacMurchy (2) – 27:09 |
| 32:04 – Pettersson (PP) | 1 – 3 |
| 35:05 – Brunner (Hofmann) | 2 – 3 |
| 38:35 – Pettersson (2) | 3 – 3 |
| 44:59 – Klasen (Mårtensson, Pettersson) | 4 – 3 |
| 45:42 – Klasen (2) | 5 – 3 |
| 59:08 – Bertaggia (EN) | 6 – 3 |

4:00 min
Penalties
4:00 min
39
Shots
23

| 27 December 2015; 15:00 | Jokerit (Finland) | 3 – 5 (2 – 2, 1 – 2, 0 – 1) | (Germany) Adler Mannheim | Vaillant Arena; Attendance: 6,300 |

Game reference

Riku Helenius
Goalies
Dennis Endras
Referees:
(Finland) Miko Kaukokari
(Sweden) Marcus Vinnerborg
Linesmen:
(Switzerland) Cedric Borga
(Switzerland) Peter Küng

| 11:46 - Regin (Aaltonen) | 1 - 0 |
| 12:13 - Sallinen (Kennedy, Kozun) | 2 - 0 |
| | 2 - 1 | Metropolit (Raedeke) - 14:10 |
| | 2 - 2 | Carle (PP) - 18:07 |
| | 2 - 3 | MacMurchy (3) (Wilson, Hecht) - 22:06 |
| 24:52 - Hagman (Jaakola, Jormakka) | 3 - 3 |
| | 3 - 4 | MacMurchy (4) (Hecht, Carle) - 39:46 |
| | 3 - 5 | Hospelt (SH) - 59:24 |

6:00 min
Penalties
8:00 min
29
Shots
31

| 28 December 2015; 15:00 | HC Lugano (Switzerland) | 4 – 6 (0 – 1, 4 – 2, 0 – 3) | (Finland) Jokerit | Vaillant Arena; Attendance: 6,300 |

Game reference

Mark Owuya (20:00, 1st period)
Elvis Merzļikins (40:00)
Goalies
Henrik Karlsson
Referees:
(Finland) Mikko Kaukokari
(Switzerland) Daniel Stricker
Linesmen:
(Switzerland) Cedric Borga
(Switzerland) Nicolas Fluri

| | 0 - 1 | Kozun (Lajunen) - 17:15 |
| 21:00 - Glenn (Stapleton, Pettersson) | 1 - 1 |
| 22:09 - Kienzle (Filppula) | 2 - 1 |
| | 2 - 2 | Kennedy - 23:59 |
| | 2 - 3 | Talaja - 31:42 |
| 36:50 - Brunner (2) (Hofmann) (SH) | 3 - 3 |
| 37:29 - Klasen (3) (Pettersson) | 4 - 3 |
| | 4 - 4 | Larsen - 40:27 |
| | 4 - 5 | Kulda - 45:20 |
| | 4 - 6 | Lajunen (Jormakka) - 53:20 |

6:00 min
Penalties
6:00 min
25
Shots
37

=== Group Cattini ===
| Team | Pld | W | OTW | OTL | L | GF | GA | GD | Pts | Qualification |
|---|---|---|---|---|---|---|---|---|---|---|
| Team Canada | 2 | 2 | 0 | 0 | 0 | 4 | 1 | +3 | 6 | Clinched group |
| (Russia) Avtomobilist Yekaterinburg | 2 | 1 | 0 | 0 | 1 | 6 | 3 | +3 | 3 | Quarterfinal berth |
| (Switzerland) HC Davos | 2 | 0 | 0 | 0 | 2 | 1 | 7 | −6 | 0 | Quarterfinal berth |

All times are local (UTC+1).

| 26 December 2015; 20:15 | Avtomobilist Yekaterinburg (Russia) | 1 – 2 (0 – 1, 1 – 1, 0 – 0) | Team Canada | Vaillant Arena; Attendance: 6,300 |

Game reference

Igor Ustinsky
Goalies
Drew MacIntyre
Referees:
(Switzerland) Daniel Stricker
(Sweden) Marcus Vinnerborg
Linesmen:
(Switzerland) Peter Küng
(Switzerland) Michaël Tscherring

| | 0 – 1 | Carrick (Sheppard, Lombardi) – 19:59 |
| 28:57 – Torchenyuk (SH) | 1 – 1 |
| | 1 – 2 | Conacher (Roy) – 33:13 |

14:00 min
Penalties
4:00 min
23
Shots
27

| 27 December 2015; 20:15 | HC Davos (Switzerland) | 1 – 5 (0 – 1, 1 – 3, 0 – 1) | (Russia) Avtomobilist Yekaterinburg | Vaillant Arena; Attendance: 6,300 |

Game reference

Leonardo Genoni
Goalies
Jakub Kovář
Referees:
(Canada) Greg Kimmerly
(Switzerland) Tobias Wehrli
Linesmen:
(Switzerland) Nicolas Fluri
(Switzerland) Michaël Tscherring

| | 0 – 1 | Mikhnov (Koukal, Elo) (PP) – 19:13 |
| | 0 – 2 | Golyshev (Koukal, Mikhnov) – 29:02 |
| 30:33 – Setoguchi | 1 – 2 |
| | 1 – 3 | Yemelin (Golyshev) – 33:46 |
| | 1 – 4 | Alexeyev (Timashov) – 38:16 |
| | 1 – 5 | Mikhnov (2) – 51:31 |

6:00 min
Penalties
6:00 min
24
Shots
31

| 28 December 2015; 20:15 | Team Canada | 2 – 0 (0 – 0, 2 – 0, 0 – 0) | (Switzerland) HC Davos | Vaillant Arena; Attendance: 6,300 |

Game reference
| Jeff Glass | Goalies | Leonardo Genoni | Referees: (Canada) Greg Kimmerly (Sweden) Marcus Vinnerborg; Linesmen: (Switzerland) Balázs Kovács (Switzerland) Michaël Tscherring |
| Giroux (Lombardi, Cundari) - 25:35 / 1 - 0; DiDomenico (Pyatt) - 31:27 / 2 - 0 | | | Referees: (Canada) Greg Kimmerly (Sweden) Marcus Vinnerborg; Linesmen: (Switzerland) Balázs Kovács (Switzerland) Michaël Tscherring |
| 6:00 min | Penalties | 4:00 min | Referees: (Canada) Greg Kimmerly (Sweden) Marcus Vinnerborg; Linesmen: (Switzerland) Balázs Kovács (Switzerland) Michaël Tscherring |
| 42 | Shots | 21 | Referees: (Canada) Greg Kimmerly (Sweden) Marcus Vinnerborg; Linesmen: (Switzerland) Balázs Kovács (Switzerland) Michaël Tscherring |

== Knockout stage ==
Quarterfinals
A2 | (Finland) Jokerit | 4
B3 | (Switzerland) HC Davos (OT) | 5
B2 | (Russia) Avtomobilist Yekaterinburg | 3
A3 | (Germany) Adler Mannheim | 1

Semifinals
B1 | Team Canada | 6
QF1 | (Switzerland) HC Davos | 5
A1 | (Switzerland) HC Lugano | 3
QF2 | (Russia) Avtomobilist Yekaterinburg | 0

Final
SF1 | Team Canada | 4
SF2 | (Switzerland) HC Lugano | 3

=== Quarterfinals ===
All times are local (UTC+1).

| 29 December 2015; 15:00 | Jokerit (Finland) | 4 – 5 OT (1 – 1, 3 – 1, 0 – 2, 0 – 1) | (Switzerland) HC Davos | Vaillant Arena; Attendance: 6,300 |

Game reference

Riku Helenius
Goalies
Gilles Senn
Referees:
(Finland) Mikko Kaukokari
(Canada) Greg Kimmerly
Linesmen:
(Switzerland) Balázs Kovács
(Switzerland) Peter Küng

| | 0 - 1 | Portmann (Sieber) - 02:20 |
| 12:13 - Todd (PS) | 1 - 1 |
| | 1 - 2 | Koistinen (PP) - 30:23 |
| 31:33 - Aaltonen (Joensuu) | 2 - 2 |
| 36:17 - Talaja (2) (Ohtamaa) | 3 - 2 |
| 38:50 - Regin (2) (Aaltonen, Joensuu) | 4 - 2 |
| | 4 - 3 | Jörg (Corvi) - 50:46 |
| | 4 - 4 | Walser (M. Wieser, Ambühl) - 55:54 |
| | 4 - 5 | Sciaroni (Ambühl, Jörg) - 63:40 |

20:00 min
Penalties
20:00 min
33
Shots
28

| 29 December 2015; 20:15 | Avtomobilist Yekaterinburg (Russia) | 3 – 1 (3 – 0, 0 – 0, 0 – 1) | (Germany) Adler Mannheim | Vaillant Arena; Attendance: 6,300 |

Game reference

Igor Ustinsky
Goalies
Dennis Endras
Referees:
(Switzerland) Daniel Stricker
(Switzerland) Tobias Wehrli
Linesmen:
(Switzerland) Cedric Borga
(Switzerland) Nicolas Fluri

| 7:25 - Kivistö (Roman) | 1 - 0 |
| 10:43 - Torchenyuk (2) (Roman) | 2 - 0 |
| 16:44 - Yemelin (2) (Kivistö) (PP) | 3 - 0 |
| | 3 - 1 | Raedeke (Arendt, Carle) - 50:32 |

4:00 min
Penalties
10:00 min
28
Shots
25

=== Semifinals ===
All times are local (UTC+1).

| 30 December 2015; 15:00 | Team Canada | 6 – 5 (1 – 3, 3 – 1, 2 – 1) | (Switzerland) HC Davos | Vaillant Arena; Attendance: 6,300 |

http://www.cdmediateam.com/dl/spc2015/Game9.pdf

Jeff Glass (26:43, 1st and 2nd periods)
Matt Climie
Goalies
Leonardo Genoni
Referees:
(Canada) Greg Kimmerly
(Switzerland) Daniel Stricker
Linesmen:
(Switzerland) Balázs Kovács
(Switzerland) Peter Küng

| | 0 - 1 | Sciaroni (2) (PP) - 6:16 |
| | 0 - 2 | Ryser - 6:39 |
| 9:25 - Pyatt (Sheppard, Bergeron) (PP) | 1 - 2 |
| | 1 - 3 | Picard (Moss, Setoguchi) - 18:52 |
| | 1 - 4 | Du Bois (Walser, Koistinen) - 26:43 |
| 27:05 - DiDomenico (2) (Pyatt, Sheppard) | 2 - 4 |
| 29:33 - Ellison (Conacher, Ellerby) (PP) | 3 - 4 |
| 38:37 - Ellison (2) (Conacher, Ellerby) | 4 - 4 |
| | 4 - 5 | Lindgren (M. Wieser) - 47:33 |
| 55:26 - Giroux (2) (D'Agostini, Lombardi) | 5 - 5 |
| 56:31 - Conacher (2) (Ellison, Roy) | 6 - 5 |

6:00 min
Penalties
14:00 min
45
Shots
28

| 30 December 2015; 20:15 | HC Lugano (Switzerland) | 3 – 0 (1 – 0, 1 – 0, 1 – 0) | (Russia) Avtomobilist Yekaterinburg | Vaillant Arena; Attendance: 6,300 |

Game reference

Elvis Merzļikins
Goalies
Jan Kovář (00:00-58:09)
Referees:
(Sweden) Marcus Vinnerborg
(Switzerland) Tobias Wehrli
Linesmen:
(Switzerland) Nicolas Fluri
(Switzerland) Michaël Tscherring

| 15:11 - Stapleton (Furrer) | 1 - 0 |
| 24:12 - Klasen (4) (Pettersson) | 2 - 0 |
| 56:12 - Brunner (3) (Walker, Spang) (EN) | 3 - 0 |

6:00 min
Penalties
4:00 min
28
Shots
30

=== Final ===
All times are local (UTC+1).

| 31 December 2015; 12:00 | Team Canada | 4 – 3 (1 – 1, 2 – 1, 1 – 1) | (Switzerland) HC Lugano | Vaillant Arena; Attendance: 6,300 |

Game reference

Jeff Glass
Goalies
Elvis Merzļikins (00:00-59:16)
Referees:
(Canada) Greg Kimmerly
(Sweden) Marcus Vinnerborg
Linesmen:
(Switzerland) Cedric Borga
(Switzerland) Michaël Tscherrig

| | 0 - 1 | Hofmann (Bertaggia, Filppula) - 8:49 |
| 15:59 - Ellerby (DiDomenico) | 1 - 1 |
| 23:27 - Roy (Conacher) | 2 - 1 |
| 25:00 Pyatt (2) (DiDomenico) | 3 - 1 |
| | 3 - 2 | Chiesa (Brunner, Klasen) (PP) - 32:50 |
| | 3 - 3 | Hofmann (Bertaggia, Filippula) - 45:08 |
| 48:13 - D'Agostini (Lombardi, Johnson) | 4 - 3 |

12:00 min
Penalties
6:00 min
44
Shots
34

== Champions ==
2015 Spengler Cup Winners
(Canada)
Team Canada
13th title

== All-Star Team ==
| Position | Player | Nationality | Team |
|---|---|---|---|
| Goaltender | Igor Ustinsky | (Russia) Russian | (Russia) Avtomobilist Yekaterinburg |
| Right Defender | Philipp Furrer | (Switzerland) Swiss | (Switzerland) HC Lugano |
| Left Defender | Artūrs Kulda | (Latvia) Latvian | (Finland) Jokerit |
| Right Wing | Linus Klasen | (Sweden) Swedish | (Switzerland) HC Lugano |
| Center | Cory Conacher | (Canada) Canadian | Team Canada |
| Left Wing | Ryan MacMurchy | (Canada) Canadian | (Germany) Adler Mannheim |

== Statistics ==
=== Scoring leaders ===
| Player | Team | GP | G | A | Pts |
|---|---|---|---|---|---|
| (Sweden) Linus Klasen | HC Lugano | 4 | 4 | 3 | 7 |
| (Sweden) Fredrik Pettersson | HC Lugano | 4 | 2 | 4 | 6 |
| (Canada) Cory Conacher | Team Canada | 4 | 2 | 3 | 5 |
| (Canada) Ryan MacMurchy | Adler Mannheim | 2 | 4 | 0 | 4 |
| (Switzerland) Damien Brunner | HC Lugano | 4 | 3 | 1 | 4 |
| (Canada) Chris DiDomenico | Team Canada | 4 | 2 | 2 | 4 |
| (Canada) Tom Pyatt | Team Canada | 4 | 2 | 2 | 4 |

GP = Games played; G = Goals; A = Assists; Pts = Points
