= 2009–10 Montreal Canadiens season =

NHL hockey team season

2009–10 Montreal Canadiens
- Division: 4th Northeast
- Conference: 8th Eastern
- 2009–10 record: 39–33–10
- Home record: 20–16–5
- Road record: 19–17–5
- Goals for: 217
- Goals against: 223

Team information
- General manager: Bob Gainey (Oct. 1–Feb. 10); Pierre Gauthier (interim, Feb.10–May 22)
- Coach: Jacques Martin
- Captain: Vacant
- Alternate captains: Hal Gill; Brian Gionta; Andrei Markov
- Arena: Bell Centre
- Average attendance: 21,273 (100.0%)

Team leaders
- Goals: Brian Gionta (28)
- Assists: Scott Gomez (47)
- Points: Tomas Plekanec (70)
- Penalty minutes: Ryan O'Byrne (74)
- Plus/minus: Andrei Markov (11)
- Wins: Jaroslav Halak (26)
- Goals against average: Jaroslav Halak (2.40)

The 2009–10 Montreal Canadiens season was the team's 101st season of play and 93rd in the National Hockey League (NHL).

This season marked the 100th anniversary of the organization's founding in 1909. Coinciding with this, the Montreal Canadiens hosted the 2009 NHL All-Star Game at the Bell Centre on January 25, 2009 as well as the 2009 NHL entry draft that June leading up to the centennial anniversary of the franchise on December 4, 2009.

== Season events ==
=== Off-season ===
The Canadiens announced Jacques Martin as their new head coach to replace Guy Carbonneau. Martin, the former coach and general manager of the Florida Panthers, and former coach of the Ottawa Senators and St. Louis Blues, is known for his defence-first style.

On June 20, the Canadiens announced that owner George Gillett had reached an agreement to sell his 80% share of the team, the Bell Centre and the Gillett concert promotion company to Geoffrey, Justin and Andrew Molson. This represents the third time that the hockey club will be owned by the Molson family, which owned it from 1957 to 1971 and from 1978 to 2001. The purchase price was not disclosed but was estimated at between $506 and 537 million. The deal was approved by the NHL board of governors on December 1.

At the Entry Draft, this year held in Montreal at the Bell Centre, the Canadiens made Louis Leblanc their first-round pick. The pick was notable as it was the Canadiens' first first-round pick of a francophone since the team picked Eric Chouinard in the 1998 Entry Draft. Leblanc was born in the Montreal suburb of Kirkland.

General manager Bob Gainey pursued a policy of change for the lineup. Prior to free agency, he traded for top centre Scott Gomez in a seven-player deal from the New York Rangers. In free agency, the Canadiens signed Gomez's former New Jersey linemate Brian Gionta, high-scoring Calgary Flames forward Michael Cammalleri, checking line winger Travis Moen, and three defencemen: Hal Gill from the Pittsburgh Penguins, Jaroslav Spacek from the Buffalo Sabres, and Paul Mara from the New York Rangers. Captain Saku Koivu was not offered a contract and instead signed with the Anaheim Ducks. Alexei Kovalev turned down a contract and signed with the Ottawa Senators. Mike Komisarek signed with the Toronto Maple Leafs and Tom Kostopoulos signed with the Carolina Hurricanes.

=== Regular season ===
For the first time in franchise history, the Canadiens enter the regular season without a captain. On October 6, 2009, the Canadiens signed defenceman Marc-Andre Bergeron due to early injuries to Andrei Markov.

On December 28, 2009, forward Michael Cammalleri scored the 20,000th goal in franchise history in a game against the Ottawa Senators.

On February 8, general manager Bob Gainey announced his retirement as general manager of the club, staying on as advisor to the club. Assistant general manager Pierre Gauthier became the interim general manager. Gauthier and head coach Jacques Martin held the same positions with the Ottawa Senators in the late 1990s.

The Canadiens finished the regular season with the fewest power-play opportunities of all 30 teams with 261.

=== Playoffs ===
In the Eastern Conference Quarterfinals, the Canadiens faced the winners of the 2009–10 Presidents' Trophy, the Washington Capitals, who had led the league with the most goals scored during the regular season (318) and the most points (121). Despite trailing 3–1 after the first four games, the Canadiens won the final three, holding the Capitals to three goals. Montreal went 3–1 on the road in the series.

In the Eastern Conference Semi-finals, the Canadiens faced the defending Stanley Cup champion Pittsburgh Penguins. Once again, the Canadiens found themselves trailing, this time 3–2. After edging the Penguins 4–3 at home in Game 6, the Canadiens jumped out to a 4–0 lead in Game 7 on the road and would go on to win by a final score of 5–2, thereby clinching the series 4–3.

In the Eastern Conference Final against the Philadelphia Flyers, the Canadiens were shut out by scores of 6–0 and 3–0 in the first two games. They came back and won Game 3 at home by a score of 5–1. Game 4 was scoreless until 5:41 of the second period, when Flyers forward Claude Giroux scored his seventh of the playoffs on an assist from Kimmo Timonen. Ville Leino would score at 14:53 of the same period and Giroux would seal the win with an empty-net goal with 1:13 remaining in the game. The 3–0 Flyers' win game them a 3–1 lead in the series. The Canadiens would open the scoring in Game 5 just 59 seconds into the game on Brian Gionta's ninth of the playoffs, but the Flyers took a 3–1 lead on a short-handed goal by Flyers' captain Mike Richards at 4:25 of the first period and even-strength goals 84 seconds apart by Arron Asham and Jeff Carter in the second period. The Canadiens cut the Flyer's lead to one on Scott Gomez's second of the playoffs (assisted by P. K. Subban and Brian Gionta) at 6:53 of the third period, but Jeff Carter would seal the 4–2 Flyers' win with an empty-net goal at 19:37 and give Philadelphia a 4–1 series win. The Canadiens' playoff performance was the franchise's best in 17 years, as it was the first time they reached the Conference Finals since 1993. However, with this loss, the Canadiens failed to become champions during the 2000s. Having won at least one Stanley Cup in each decade since the 1910s, the 2000s was their first decade without a Cup, thus ending a nine-decade streak of at least one championship per decade.

== Standings ==
=== Divisional standings ===
Northeast Division
		GP	W	L	OTL	GF	GA	Pts
**1**	**y – Buffalo Sabres**	**82**	**45**	**27**	**10**	**235**	**207**	**100**
**2**	**Ottawa Senators**	**82**	**44**	**32**	**6**	**225**	**238**	**94**
**3**	**Boston Bruins**	**82**	**39**	**30**	**13**	**206**	**200**	**91**
**4**	**Montreal Canadiens**	**82**	**39**	**33**	**10**	**217**	**223**	**88**
5	Toronto Maple Leafs	82	30	38	14	214	263	74

=== Conference standings ===
Eastern Conference
R		Div	GP	W	L	OTL	GF	GA	Pts
**1**	**p – Washington Capitals**	**SE**	**82**	**54**	**15**	**13**	**318**	**233**	121
**2**	**y – New Jersey Devils**	**AT**	**82**	**48**	**27**	**7**	**222**	**191**	103
**3**	**y – Buffalo Sabres**	**NE**	**82**	**45**	**27**	**10**	**235**	**207**	100
**4**	**Pittsburgh Penguins**	**AT**	**82**	**47**	**28**	**7**	**257**	**237**	101
**5**	**Ottawa Senators**	**NE**	**82**	**44**	**32**	**6**	**225**	**238**	94
**6**	**Boston Bruins**	**NE**	**82**	**39**	**30**	**13**	**206**	**200**	91
**7**	**Philadelphia Flyers**	**AT**	**82**	**41**	**35**	**6**	**236**	**225**	88
**8**	**Montreal Canadiens**	**NE**	**82**	**39**	**33**	**10**	**217**	**223**	88
8.5
9	New York Rangers	AT	82	38	33	11	222	218	87
10	Atlanta Thrashers	SE	82	35	34	13	234	256	83
11	Carolina Hurricanes	SE	82	35	37	10	230	256	80
12	Tampa Bay Lightning	SE	82	34	36	12	217	260	80
13	New York Islanders	AT	82	34	37	11	222	264	79
14	Florida Panthers	SE	82	32	37	13	208	244	77
15	Toronto Maple Leafs	NE	82	30	38	14	214	267	74

bold – Qualified for playoffs; y – Won division; p – Won Presidents' Trophy (and division)

AT – Atlantic Division, NE – Northeast Division, SE – Southeast Division

== Schedule and results ==
=== Preseason ===
Pre-season: 4–2–1 (home: 4–0–1; road: 0–2–0)

Game	Date	Opponent	Score	Location	Attendance	Record	Recap
1	September 17	Florida Panthers	2–3	Bell Centre	21,273	1–0–0	
2	September 18	Ottawa Senators	1–2	Bell Centre	21,273	2–0–0	
3	September 19	@ Ottawa Senators	6–1	Scotiabank Place	17,931	2–1–0	
4	September 20	@ Boston Bruins	2–1	Colisée Pepsi, Quebec City	15,399	2–2–0	
5	September 21	Pittsburgh Penguins	3–4	Bell Centre	21,273	3–2–0	
6	September 24	Boston Bruins	2–1 SO	Bell Centre	21,273	3–2–1	
7	September 26	Buffalo Sabres	2–3	Bell Centre	21,273	4–2–1	

=== Regular season ===
2009–10 game log
October: 7–7–0 (home: 5–2–0; road: 2–5–0)

Game	Date	Opponent	Score	Location	Attendance	Record	Points	Recap
1	October 1	@ Toronto Maple Leafs	4–3 OT	Air Canada Centre	19,617	1–0–0	2	
2	October 3	@ Buffalo Sabres	2–1 OT	HSBC Arena	18,690	2–0–0	4	
3	October 6	@ Calgary Flames	3–4	Pengrowth Saddledome	19,289	2–1–0	4	
4	October 7	@ Vancouver Canucks	1–7	General Motors Place	18,810	2–2–0	4	
5	October 10	@ Edmonton Oilers	2–3	Rexall Place	16,839	2–3–0	4	
6	October 15	Colorado Avalanche	2–3	Bell Centre	21,273	2–4–0	4	
7	October 17	Ottawa Senators	1–3	Bell Centre	21,273	2–5–0	4	
8	October 20	Atlanta Thrashers	2–1 SO	Bell Centre	21,273	3–5–0	6	
9	October 22	New York Islanders	5–1	Bell Centre	21,273	4–5–0	8	
10	October 24	New York Rangers	5–4 OT	Bell Centre	21,273	5–5–0	10	
11	October 26	New York Islanders	3–2 OT	Bell Centre	21,273	6–5–0	12	
12	October 28	@ Pittsburgh Penguins	1–6	Mellon Arena	16,965	6–6–0	12	
13	October 30	@ Chicago Blackhawks	2–3	United Center	20,807	6–7–0	12	
14	October 31	Toronto Maple Leafs	5–4 SO	Bell Centre	21,273	7–7–0	14	

November: 5–5–2 (home: 2–3–2; road: 3–2–0)
Season: 12–12–2 (home: 7–5–2; road: 5–7–0)

Game	Date	Opponent	Score	Location	Attendance	Record	Points	Recap
15	November 3	Atlanta Thrashers	5–4	Bell Centre	21,273	7–8–0	14	
16	November 5	@ Boston Bruins	1–2 SO	TD Garden	17,565	8–8–0	16	
17	November 7	Tampa Bay Lightning	3–1	Bell Centre	21,273	8–9–0	16	
18	November 10	Calgary Flames	1–0	Bell Centre	21,273	8–10–0	16	
19	November 12	@ Phoenix Coyotes	2–4	Jobing.com Arena	10,064	9–10–0	18	
20	November 14	@ Nashville Predators	2–0	Sommet Center	15,604	9–11–0	18	
21	November 17	Carolina Hurricanes	2–3 SO	Bell Centre	21,273	10–11–0	20	
22	November 20	@ Washington Capitals	2–3	Verizon Center	18,277	11–11–0	22	
23	November 21	Detroit Red Wings	3–2 SO	Bell Centre	21,273	11–11–1	23	
24	November 24	Columbus Blue Jackets	3–5	Bell Centre	21,273	12–11–1	25	
25	November 25	@ Pittsburgh Penguins	3–1	Mellon Arena	17,094	12–12–1	25	
26	November 28	Washington Capitals	4–3 SO	Bell Centre	21,273	12–12–2	26	

December: 9–7–1 (home: 2–4–0; road: 7–3–1)
Season: 21–19–3 (home: 9–9–2; road: 12–10–1)

Game	Date	Opponent	Score	Location	Attendance	Record	Points	Recap
27	December 1	Toronto Maple Leafs	3–0	Bell Centre	21,273	12–13–2	26	
28	December 3	@ Buffalo Sabres	6–2	HSBC Arena	18,690	12–14–2	26	
29	December 4	Boston Bruins	1–5	Bell Centre	21,273	13–14–2	28	
30	December 7	Philadelphia Flyers	1–3	Bell Centre	21,273	14–14–2	30	
31	December 8	@ Ottawa Senators	1–4	Scotiabank Place	18,866	15–14–2	32	
32	December 10	Pittsburgh Penguins	3–2	Bell Centre	21,273	15–15–2	32	
33	December 12	@ Atlanta Thrashers	3–4 OT	Philips Arena	16,616	15–15–3	33	
34	December 14	Buffalo Sabres	4–3	Bell Centre	21,273	15–16–3	33	
35	December 16	@ New Jersey Devils	2–1	Prudential Center	12,178	15–17–3	33	
36	December 17	Minnesota Wild	3–1	Bell Centre	21,273	15–18–3	33	
37	December 19	@ New York Islanders	0–3	Nassau Coliseum	7,842	16–18–3	35	
38	December 21	@ Atlanta Thrashers	3–4 OT	Philips Arena	15,075	17–18–3	37	
39	December 23	@ Carolina Hurricanes	1–5	RBC Center	14,820	18–18–3	39	
40	December 26	@ Toronto Maple Leafs	2–3 OT	Air Canada Centre	19,250	19–18–3	41	
41	December 28	@ Ottawa Senators	4–2	Scotiabank Place	20,369	19–19–3	41	
42	December 30	@ Tampa Bay Lightning	1–2 OT	St. Pete Times Forum	18,441	20–19–3	43	
43	December 31	@ Florida Panthers	4–5	BankAtlantic Center	19,851	21–19–3	45	

January: 4–6–3 (home: 3–2–2; road: 1–4–1)
Season: 25–25–6 (home: 12–11–4; road: 13–14–2)

Game	Date	Opponent	Score	Location	Attendance	Record	Points	Recap
44	January 3	Buffalo Sabres	1–0	Bell Centre	21,273	21–20–3	45	
45	January 5	@ Washington Capitals	4–2	Verizon Center	18,277	21–21–3	45	
46	January 7	Florida Panthers	0–2	Bell Centre	21,273	22–21–3	47	
47	January 9	New Jersey Devils	2–1 OT	Bell Centre	21,273	22–21–4	48	
48	January 14	Dallas Stars	3–5	Bell Centre	21,273	23–21–4	50	
49	January 16	Ottawa Senators	4–2	Bell Centre	21,273	23–22–4	50	
50	January 17	@ New York Rangers	2–6	Madison Square Garden	18,200	23–23–4	50	
51	January 20	St. Louis Blues	4–3 OT	Bell Centre	21,273	23–23–5	51	
52	January 22	@ New Jersey Devils	3–1	Prudential Center	17,625	24–23–5	53	
53	January 23	New York Rangers	6–0	Bell Centre	21,273	25–23–5	55	
54	January 26	@ Florida Panthers	1–2	BankAtlantic Center	17,104	25–24–5	55	
55	January 27	@ Tampa Bay Lightning	0–3	St. Pete Times Forum	14,404	25–25–5	55	
56	January 30	@ Ottawa Senators	2–3 OT	Scotiabank Place	20,500	25–25–6	56	

February: 4–3–0 (home: 3–1–0; road: 1–1–0)
Season: 29–28–6 (home: 15–13–4; road: 14–15–2)

Game	Date	Opponent	Score	Location	Attendance	Record	Points	Recap
57	February 2	Vancouver Canucks	2–3	Bell Centre	21,273	26–25–6	58	
58	February 4	@ Boston Bruins	3–2 SO	TD Garden	17,565	27–25–6	60	
59	February 6	Pittsburgh Penguins	3–5	Bell Centre	21,273	28–25–6	62	
60	February 7	Boston Bruins	3–0	Bell Centre	21,273	28–26–6	62	
61	February 10	Washington Capitals	5–6 OT	Bell Centre	21,273	29–26–6	64	
62	February 12	@ Philadelphia Flyers	3–2	Wachovia Center	19,803	29–27–6	64	
63	February 13	Philadelphia Flyers	6–2	Bell Centre	21,273	29–28–6	64	

March: 8–4–2 (home: 4–3–0; road: 4–1–2)
Season: 37–32–8 (home: 19–16–4; road: 18–16–4)

Game	Date	Opponent	Score	Location	Attendance	Record	Points	Recap
64	March 2	@ Boston Bruins	1–4	TD Garden	17,565	30–28–6	66	
65	March 4	@ San Jose Sharks	3–2	HP Pavilion	17,562	30–29–6	66	
66	March 6	@ Los Angeles Kings	2–4	Staples Center	18,118	31–29–6	68	
67	March 7	@ Anaheim Ducks	3–4 SO	Honda Center	15,883	32–29–6	70	
68	March 9	Tampa Bay Lightning	3–5	Bell Centre	21,273	33–29–6	72	
69	March 11	Edmonton Oilers	4–5 SO	Bell Centre	21,273	34–29–6	74	
70	March 13	Boston Bruins	2–3	Bell Centre	21,273	35–29–6	76	
71	March 16	@ New York Rangers	1–3	Madison Square Garden	18,200	36–29–6	78	
72	March 20	@ Toronto Maple Leafs	3–2 SO	Air Canada Centre	19,538	36–29–7	79	
73	March 22	Ottawa Senators	2–0	Bell Centre	21,273	36–30–7	79	
74	March 24	@ Buffalo Sabres	3–2 SO	HSBC Arena	18,690	36–30–8	80	
75	March 25	Florida Panthers	1–4	Bell Centre	21,273	37–30–8	82	
76	March 27	New Jersey Devils	4–2	Bell Centre	21,273	37–31–8	82	
77	March 31	Carolina Hurricanes	1–2	Bell Centre	21,273	37–32–8	82	

April: 2–1–2 (home: 1–0–1; road: 1–1–1)
Season: 39–33–10 (home: 20–16–5; road: 19–17–5)

Game	Date	Opponent	Score	Location	Attendance	Record	Points	Recap
78	April 2	@ Philadelphia Flyers	0–1	Wachovia Center	19,801	38–32–8	84	
79	April 3	Buffalo Sabres	0–3	Bell Centre	21,273	39–32–8	86	
80	April 6	@ New York Islanders	4–3 SO	Nassau Coliseum	10,263	39–32–9	87	
81	April 8	@ Carolina Hurricanes	5–2	RBC Center	18,680	39–33–9	87	
82	April 10	Toronto Maple Leafs	4–3 OT	Bell Centre	21,273	39–33–10	88	

Legend:

Win Loss Overtime/shootout loss

2009–10 schedule

== Playoffs ==
Qualifying for the 2010 Stanley Cup playoffs as the eighth and final seed, the Canadiens were able to upset the first-seeded Washington Capitals during the first round, and then eliminated the defending Stanley Cup champion Pittsburgh Penguins before falling to the Eastern Conference champion Philadelphia Flyers in five games.

2010 Stanley Cup playoffs
Eastern Conference Quarter-finals: vs. (1) Washington Capitals

#	Date	Visitor	Score	Home	OT	Decision	Attendance	Series	Recap
1	April 15	Montreal Canadiens	3–2	Washington Capitals	OT	Halak	18,377	Canadiens lead 1–0	
2	April 17	Montreal Canadiens	5–6	Washington Capitals	OT	Halak	18,377	Series tied 1–1	
3	April 19	Washington Capitals	5–1	Montreal Canadiens		Halak	21,273	Capitals lead 2–1	
4	April 21	Washington Capitals	6–3	Montreal Canadiens		Price	21,273	Capitals lead 3–1	
5	April 23	Montreal Canadiens	2–1	Washington Capitals		Halak	18,377	Capitals lead 3–2	
6	April 26	Washington Capitals	1–4	Montreal Canadiens		Halak	21,273	Series tied 3–3	
7	April 28	Montreal Canadiens	2–1	Washington Capitals		Halak	18,377	Canadiens win 4–3	

Eastern Conference Semi-finals: vs. (4) Pittsburgh Penguins

#	Date	Visitor	Score	Home	OT	Decision	Attendance	Series	Recap
1	April 30	Montreal Canadiens	3–6	Pittsburgh Penguins		Halak	17,132	Penguins lead 1–0	
2	May 2	Montreal Canadiens	3–1	Pittsburgh Penguins		Halak	17,132	Series tied 1–1	
3	May 4	Pittsburgh Penguins	2–0	Montreal Canadiens		Halak	21,273	Penguins lead 2–1	
4	May 6	Pittsburgh Penguins	2–3	Montreal Canadiens		Halak	21,273	Series tied 2–2	
5	May 8	Montreal Canadiens	1–2	Pittsburgh Penguins		Halak	17,132	Penguins lead 3–2	
6	May 10	Pittsburgh Penguins	3–4	Montreal Canadiens		Halak	21,273	Series tied 3–3	
7	May 12	Montreal Canadiens	5–2	Pittsburgh Penguins		Halak	17,132	Canadiens win 4–3	

Eastern Conference Finals: vs. (7) Philadelphia Flyers

#	Date	Visitor	Score	Home	OT	Decision	Attendance	Series	Recap
1	May 16	Montreal Canadiens	0–6	Philadelphia Flyers		Halak	19,927	Flyers lead 1–0	
2	May 18	Montreal Canadiens	0–3	Philadelphia Flyers		Halak	19,907	Flyers lead 2–0	
3	May 20	Philadelphia Flyers	1–5	Montreal Canadiens		Halak	21,273	Flyers lead 2–1	
4	May 22	Philadelphia Flyers	3–0	Montreal Canadiens		Halak	21,273	Flyers lead 3–1	
5	May 24	Montreal Canadiens	2–4	Philadelphia Flyers		Halak	19,986	Flyers win 4–1	

Legend:

Win Loss

== Player statistics ==
=== Skaters ===
Note: GP = Games played; G = Goals; A = Assists; Pts = Points; +/− = Plus/minus; PIM = Penalty minutes

Regular season

Player	GP	G	A	Pts	+/−	PIM
Tomas Plekanec	82	25	45	70	5	50
Scott Gomez	78	12	47	59	1	60
Michael Cammalleri	65	26	24	50	7	16
Brian Gionta	61	28	18	46	3	26
Andrei Markov	45	6	28	34	11	32
Marc-Andre Bergeron	60	13	21	34	−7	16
Andrei Kostitsyn	59	15	18	33	1	32
Glen Metropolit	69	16	13	29	−1	24
Roman Hamrlik	75	6	20	26	−2	56
Benoit Pouliot^{†}	39	15	9	24	8	31
Jaroslav Spacek	74	3	18	21	9	50
Travis Moen	81	8	11	19	−2	57
Sergei Kostitsyn	47	7	11	18	4	8
Max Pacioretty	52	3	11	14	−5	20
Maxim Lapierre	76	7	7	14	−14	61
Hal Gill	68	2	9	11	−10	68
Dominic Moore^{†}	21	2	9	11	4	8
Mathieu Darche	29	5	5	10	2	4
Josh Gorges	82	3	7	10	2	39
Paul Mara	42	0	8	8	−16	48
Tom Pyatt	40	2	3	5	−5	10
Ryan O'Byrne	55	1	3	4	−3	74
Matt D'Agostini^{‡}	40	2	2	4	−12	26
Georges Laraque	28	1	2	3	−6	28
Guillaume Latendresse^{‡}	23	2	1	3	−4	4
Ryan White	16	0	2	2	−6	16
P. K. Subban	2	0	2	2	1	2
David Desharnais	6	0	1	1	−1	0
Shawn Belle	2	0	0	0	−2	0
James Wyman	3	0	0	0	−2	0
Gregory Stewart	5	0	0	0	−3	11
Mathieu Carle	3	0	0	0	1	4
Yannick Weber	5	0	0	0	−5	4
Brock Trotter	2	0	0	0	−1	0
Ben Maxwell	13	0	0	0	−2	6
Kyle Chipchura^{‡}	19	0	0	0	−10	16
Jay Leach^{‡}	7	0	0	0	0	5

Playoffs

Player	GP	G	A	Pts	+/−	PIM
Michael Cammalleri	19	13	6	19	−6	6
Brian Gionta	19	9	6	15	−6	14
Scott Gomez	19	2	12	14	−6	25
Tomas Plekanec	19	4	7	11	−4	20
Roman Hamrlik	19	0	9	9	−1	15
Andrei Kostitsyn	19	3	5	8	−1	12
P. K. Subban	14	1	7	8	2	6
Marc-Andre Bergeron	19	2	4	6	−12	10
Dominic Moore	19	4	1	5	1	6
Andrei Markov	8	0	4	4	−3	0
Jaroslav Spacek	10	1	3	4	−2	6
Maxim Lapierre	19	3	1	4	−2	20
Tom Pyatt	18	2	2	4	−1	2
Travis Moen	19	2	1	3	0	4
Glen Metropolit	16	0	2	2	−3	4
Benoit Pouliot	18	0	2	2	−5	6
Josh Gorges	19	0	2	2	−4	14
Hal Gill	18	0	1	1	−3	20
Mathieu Darche	11	0	1	1	−1	2
Sergei Kostitsyn	5	0	0	0	0	0
Ryan O'Byrne	13	0	0	0	1	10
Ben Maxwell	1	0	0	0	−1	0

=== Goaltenders ===
Note: GP = Games played; TOI = Time on ice (minutes); W = Wins; L = Losses; OT = Overtime losses; GA = Goals against; GAA= Goals against average; SA= Shots against; SV= Saves; Sv% = Save percentage; SO= Shutouts

Regular season

Player	GP	TOI	W	L	OT	GA	GAA	SA	Sv%	SO	G	A	PIM
Jaroslav Halak	45	2630	26	13	5	105	2.40	1386	.924	5	0	0	0
Carey Price	41	2358	13	20	5	109	2.77	1244	.912	0	0	1	8

Playoffs

Player	GP	TOI	W	L	GA	GAA	SA	Sv%	SO
Jaroslav Halak	18	1013	9	9	43	2.55	562	.923	0
Carey Price	4	135	0	1	8	3.56	73	.890	0

^{†}Denotes player spent time with another team before joining Canadiens. Stats reflect time with Canadiens only.
^{‡}Traded mid-season. Stats reflect time with Canadiens only.

== Suspensions/fines ==
Player	Explanation	Length	Salary	Date issued	Ref
Georges Laraque	Kneeing Red Wings defenceman Niklas Kronwall	5 games	$38,860.00	November 23, 2009	
Maxim Lapierre	Boarding Sharks forward Scott Nichol	4 games	$14,248.72	March 5, 2010	

== Awards and records ==
=== Milestones ===
Regular season
Player	Milestone	Reached
Michael Cammalleri	300th Career NHL Point	October 30, 2009
Andrei Kostitsyn	200th Career NHL Game	October 31, 2009
Mathieu Carle	1st Career NHL Game	November 3, 2009
Tom Pyatt	1st Career NHL Game	November 5, 2009
Ryan White	1st Career NHL Game; 1st Career NHL Assist; 1st Career NHL Point	November 5, 2009
Marc-Andre Bergeron	100th Career NHL Assist	November 12, 2009
Tomas Plekanec	200th Career NHL Point	November 12, 2009
J. T. Wyman	1st Career NHL Game	November 24, 2009
David Desharnais	1st Career NHL Game	November 25, 2009
Georges Laraque	100th Career NHL Assist	December 7, 2009
Michael Cammalleri	400th Career NHL Game	December 17, 2009
Travis Moen	400th Career NHL Game	December 21, 2009
Scott Gomez	600th Career NHL Point	December 26, 2009
Brian Gionta	500th Career NHL Game	January 14, 2010
Glen Metropolit	100th Career NHL Assist	January 14, 2010
Roman Hamrlik	1,200th Career NHL Game	January 17, 2010
Josh Gorges	300th Career NHL Game	January 26, 2010
Ryan O'Byrne	100th Career NHL Game	February 2, 2010
Brock Trotter	1st Career NHL Game	February 6, 2010
David Desharnais	1st Career NHL Assist; 1st Career NHL Point	February 10, 2010
Tom Pyatt	1st Career NHL Goal; 1st Career NHL Assist; 1st Career NHL Point	February 10, 2010
P. K. Subban	1st Career NHL Game; 1st Career NHL Assist; 1st Career NHL Point	February 12, 2010
Hal Gill	900th Career NHL Game	February 13, 2010
Benoit Pouliot	100th Career NHL Game	March 2, 2010
Andrei Markov	600th Career NHL Game	March 6, 2010
Glen Metropolit	400th Career NHL Game	March 9, 2010
Tomas Plekanec	100th Career NHL Goal	March 25, 2010

Playoffs
Player	Milestone	Reached
Mathieu Darche	1st Career Playoff Game	April 15, 2010
Jaroslav Halak	1st Career Playoff Win	April 15, 2010
Benoit Pouliot	1st Career Playoff Assist; 1st Career Playoff Point	April 15, 2010
Tom Pyatt	1st Career Playoff Game	April 15, 2010
Dominic Moore	1st Career Playoff Goal; 1st Career Playoff Point	April 21, 2010
Maxim Lapierre	1st Career Playoff Goal	April 26, 2010
P. K. Subban	1st Career Playoff Game; 1st Career Playoff Assist; 1st Career Playoff Point	April 26, 2010
P. K. Subban	1st Career Playoff Goal	April 30, 2010
Ben Maxwell	1st Career Playoff Game	May 2, 2010
Mathieu Darche	1st Career Playoff Assist; 1st Career Playoff Point	May 6, 2010
Tom Pyatt	1st Career Playoff Goal; 1st Career Playoff Assist; 1st Career Playoff Point	May 6, 2010
Dominic Moore	1st Career Playoff Assist	May 20, 2010

=== Awards ===
Regular season
Player	Award	Date
Mike Cammalleri	NHL Second Star of the Week	October 26, 2009
Carey Price	NHL Second Star of the Week	November 23, 2009
Jaroslav Halak	NHL First Star of the Week	December 28, 2009
Jaroslav Halak	NHL First Star of the Week	April 5, 2010

== Transactions ==
The Canadiens were involved in the following transactions during the 2009–10 season.

=== Trades ===
Date	Details	
June 27, 2009	To Pittsburgh Penguins 6th-round pick in 2010	To Montreal Canadiens 7th-round pick (211th overall) in 2009
June 30, 2009	To New York Rangers Chris Higgins; Ryan McDonagh; Pavel Valentenko; Doug Janik	To Montreal Canadiens Scott Gomez; Tom Pyatt; Michael Busto
November 23, 2009	To Minnesota Wild Guillaume Latendresse	To Montreal Canadiens Benoit Pouliot
December 2, 2009	To Anaheim Ducks Kyle Chipchura	To Montreal Canadiens 4th-round pick in 2011
February 11, 2010	To Florida Panthers 2nd-round pick in 2011	To Montreal Canadiens Dominic Moore
March 2, 2010	To St. Louis Blues Matt D'Agostini	To Montreal Canadiens Aaron Palushaj

=== Free agents acquired ===
Player	Former team	Contract terms
Andre Benoit	Sodertalje SK	1 year, 2-way contract
Mike Cammalleri	Calgary Flames	5 years, $30 million, 1-way contract
Hal Gill	Pittsburgh Penguins	2 years, $4.5 million, 1-way contract
Brian Gionta	New Jersey Devils	5 years, $25 million, 1-way contract
Mikael Johansson	Farjestad BK	1 year, 2-way contract
Jaroslav Spacek	Buffalo Sabres	3 years, $11.5 million, 1-way contract
Mathieu Darche	Portland Pirates	1 year, 2-way contract
Paul Mara	New York Rangers	1 year, $1.675 million
Travis Moen	San Jose Sharks	3 years, $4.5 million
Andreas Engqvist	Djurgardens IF	3 years, 2-way contract
Curtis Sanford	Vancouver Canucks	1 year, 2-way contract
Philippe Lefebvre	Drummondville Voltigeurs	3 years
Marc-Andre Bergeron	Minnesota Wild	1 year, $750,000
Hunter Bishop	Ohio State University	2 years
Brendon Nash	Cornell University	2 years

=== Free agents lost ===
Player	New team	Contract terms
Mike Komisarek	Toronto Maple Leafs	5 years, $22.5 million, 1-way contract
Alexei Kovalev	Ottawa Senators	2 years, $10 million
Saku Koivu	Anaheim Ducks	1 year, $3.25 million
Tom Kostopoulos	Carolina Hurricanes	3 years, $2.75 million
Mathieu Schneider	Vancouver Canucks	1 year, $1.55 million
Alex Tanguay	Tampa Bay Lightning	1 year, $2.5 million
Robert Lang	Phoenix Coyotes	1 year
Francis Bouillon	Nashville Predators	1 year, $750,000

=== Claimed via waivers ===
Player	Former team	Date claimed off waivers
Jay Leach	New Jersey Devils	November 6, 2009

=== Lost via waivers ===
Player	New team	Date claimed off waivers
Jay Leach	San Jose Sharks	December 1, 2009

=== Lost via retirement ===
Player
Patrice Brisebois

=== Player signings ===
Player	Contract terms
P. K. Subban	3 years
Andre Benoit	1 year, 2-way contract
Alex Henry	1 year, 2-way contract
Mike Glumac	1 year, 2-way contract
Kyle Chipchura	1 year, $500,000
Guillaume Latendresse	1 year, $803,000
Shawn Belle	1 year, 2-way contract
Tomas Plekanec	1 year, $2.75 million
Greg Stewart	1 year, $500,000
Matt D'Agostini	1 year
Gabriel Dumont	3-year entry-level contract

== Draft picks ==
Montreal's picks at the 2009 NHL entry draft in Montreal, Quebec.

Round	#	Player	Position	Nationality	College/junior/club team (league)
1	18	Louis Leblanc	C	Canada	Omaha Lancers (USHL)
3	65 (from Atlanta)	Joonas Nattinen	C	Finland	Blues Jr. (SM-liiga)
3	79	Mac Bennett	D	United States	Hotchkiss School (USHS-CT)
4	109	Alexander Avtsin	F	Russia	Dynamo Moscow (RHL)
5	139	Gabriel Dumont	C	Canada	Drummondville Voltigeurs (QMJHL)
6	169	Dustin Walsh	C	Canada	Kingston Voyageurs (OJHL)
7	199	Michael Cichy	C	United States	Indiana Ice (USHL)
7	211 (from Pittsburgh)	Petteri Simila	G	Finland	Karpat (Jr. A SM-liiga)

== Farm teams ==
=== Hamilton Bulldogs ===
The Hamilton Bulldogs remain Montreal's top affiliate in the American Hockey League in 2009–10.

=== Cincinnati Cyclones ===
Montreal continues their affiliation alongside the Nashville Predators for the Cincinnati Cyclones of the ECHL in 2009–10.

== Broadcasting ==
Country	Broadcaster
Canada	English: CBC, TSN, NHL Network; French: RDS, RIS.
United States	Versus, ESPN, NBC, CBS, Fox, HDNet, NHL Network.
Europe	NASN, NHL Network.
Russia	NTV (Russia).
Japan; South Korea; Thailand	ASN.

== See also ==
- 2009–10 NHL season
