= Eran Tromer =

Professor of computer science

Eran Tromer (Hebrew: ערן טרומר) is a professor of computer science at Boston University. His research focuses on information security, cryptography and algorithms. He is a founding scientist of Zcash.

== Biography ==
Tromer received his PhD from the Weizmann Institute of Science. In 2024, he joined Boston University's Hariri Institute for Computing.

== Research ==
In 2014, Tromer and his colleagues demonstrated an RSA key extraction attack using acoustic cryptanalysis, a type of side-channel attack.

In 2014, Tromer coauthored the design of Zerocash, which laid the foundation for the Zcash protocol. The work was recognized by the Test of Time Award at the IEEE Symposium on Security and Privacy.

== Awards ==
- ACM CCS The Test-of-Time Award (2019)
- IEEE Symposium on Security and Privacy Test-of-Time Award (2024)
