= Eli Ben-Sasson =

Israeli computer scientist and businessman

- אלי בן-ששון
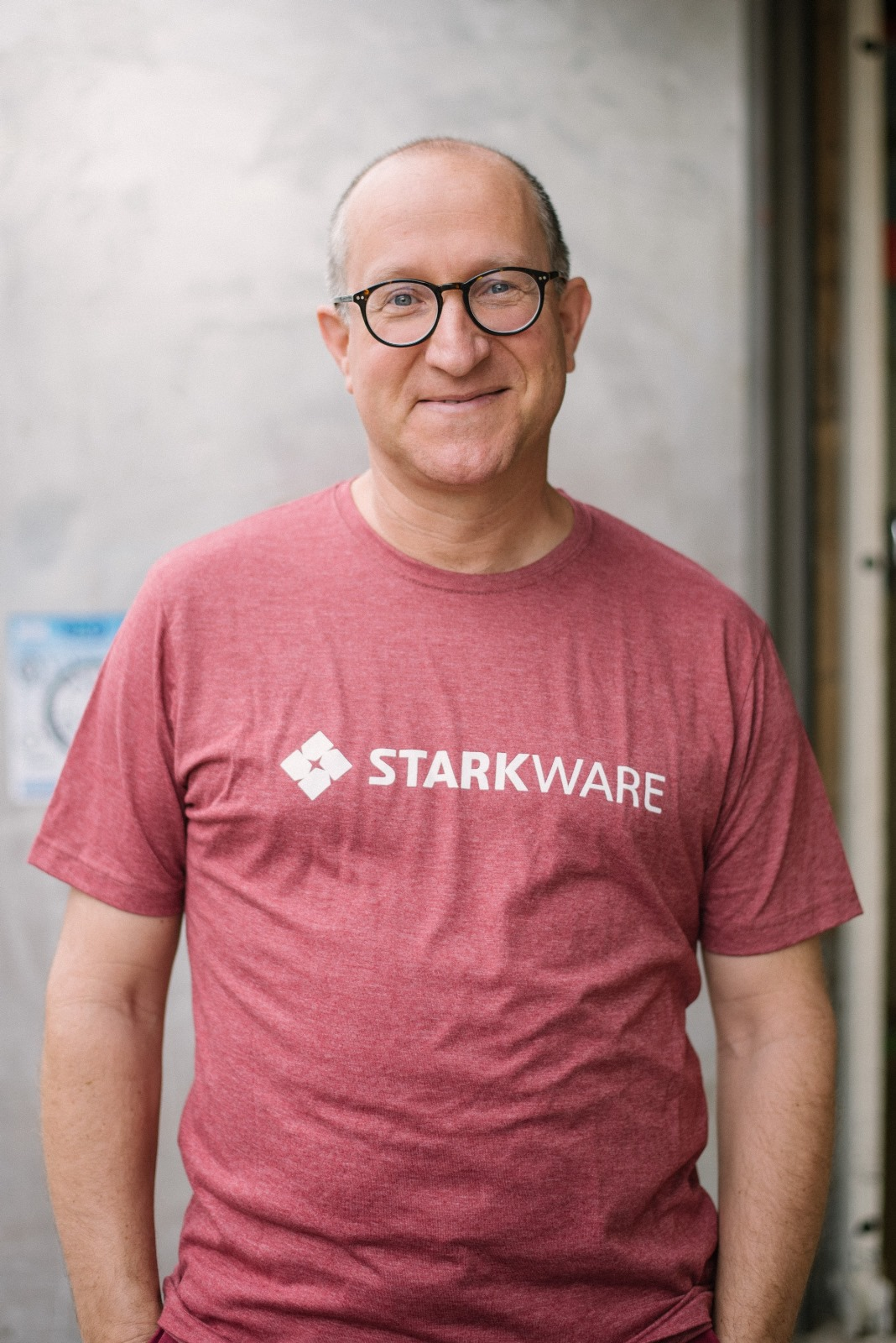
- Education: Hebrew University of Jerusalem (PhD)
- Known for: Zero-knowledge proofs; Zerocash; Zcash; STARK; FRI protocol
- Awards: IEEE Test of Time Award (2024); Henry Taub Award for Academic Excellence (2009)
- Scientific career
- Fields: Computer science
- Institutions: Technion – Israel Institute of Technology; StarkWare Industries
- Doctoral advisor: Avi Wigderson

Eli Ben-Sasson (Hebrew: אלי בן-ששון) is an Israeli computer scientist known for his work on zero-knowledge proofs. He is also the co-founder and CEO of StarkWare Industries, a Founding Scientist of Zcash, and a former Professor of Computer Science at Technion.

== Career ==
Ben-Sasson studied theoretical computer science at Hebrew University of Jerusalem, earning his PhD in 2001 under the supervision of Prof. Avi Wigderson. He then completed his Postdoctoral Studies at Harvard and MIT. In 2005, Ben-Sasson joined the faculty of the Faculty of Computer Science at the Technion as Senior Lecturer (Assistant Professor). In 2009, he received the Henry Taub Award for Academic Excellence. In 2010, Ben-Sasson was promoted to Associate Professor at the Technion and in 2015 was promoted again to Full Professor, a position he held till he left Technion in 2020. He researched theoretical computer science and computational complexity theory.

In the early 2000s, Ben-Sasson published a series of articles on short, efficiently testable proofs, including quasi-linear length PCP proofs, He later published theoretical and practical improvements of these methods.

In 2013, Ben-Sasson lectured about his research on Zero-knowledge proof at a Bitcoin conference and introduced the potential benefit of Zero-knowledge to Increase Bitcoin scalability. He then met with early crypto pioneers, including Vitalik Buterin and Greg Maxwell, and raised awareness for the use of Zero-knowledge proof in crypto. Following that, he began working towards the practical realization of his research in the field of crypto and blockchain.

In 2014, Ben-Sasson and other researchers collaborated on Zerocash, a design for a private cryptocurrency based on zero-knowledge proofs. This research won the 2024 IEEE Test of Time Award. Ben-Sasson later became a founding scientist of Zcash, which was based on the Zerocash design.

In 2018, Ben-Sasson and other researchers invented STARKs and FRI protocols, which together created a type of zero-knowledge proof with several unique traits: (1) protection against quantum computers, (2) quasi-linear proof time, (3) polylogarithmic verification time, and (4) transparency, which means no dependence on secret keys. Later that year, Ben-Sasson co-founded StarkWare Industries alongside Uri Kolodny (who served as its first CEO), Michael Riabzev (his PhD student) and Alessandro Chiesa. StarkWare offers scaling solutions for blockchains using STARK techniques. Since February 2024 Ben-Sasson has been both CEO and president of the company.

In April 2019, Technion sued Ben-Sasson along with his PhD student and co-founder Michael Riabzev and others, alleging that StarkWare Industries was based on intellectual property developed at the university. The institute demanded 50% of Ben-Sasson's stake in the company. Ben-Sasson maintained that the company used employees' knowledge and open source code, but no invention belonging to the Technion. No patents or other IP claims were submitted by Techion since then, and in 2020 the two sides reached an agreement before the case reached the court.
