= Wheere =

French company

- Type: Private
- Industry: Indoor geolocation
- Founded: 2021
- Founder: Pierre-Arnaud Coquelin Antoine Carrabin
- Headquarters: Castelnau-le-Lez, France
- Website: www.wheere.com

Wheere is a French company based in Castelnau-le-Lez that develops an indoor positioning system. It was founded in 2021 by Antoine Carrabin and Pierre-Arnaud Coquelin.

== Activity ==
Wheere is a company specialized in indoor geolocation, providing a technology capable of locating with an accuracy of less than one meter indoors, even through 50 meters of concrete. Its solution relies on low-frequency wave emission and an algorithm, enabling coverage in complex environments such as industrial sites, hospitals or tunnels. It needs only four antennas to cover one square kilometer, and its independent from GNSS systems.

== History ==
Wheere was founded in 2021 by Pierre-Arnaud Coquelin and Antoine Carrabin, after identifying a gap in the indoor geolocation market. This venture emerged from an earlier experiment with McLloyd, founded by Coquelin in 2013, which focused on GPS tracking in sports. After several years of research and testing, the company launched the first version of its system in Montpellier.

In July 2023, Wheere raised €11 million from Blast.Club, Sofilaro, Bpifrance and angel investors including Arnaud Frey (founder and CEO of Extia), Adrien Montfort (co-founder and CTO of Sorare) and Arthur (producer and television host).

In November 2023, Wheere announced the deployment of its indoor geolocation technology for the Paris 2024 Olympic Games, in partnership with the Paris Fire Brigade.

In January 2025, Wheere was selected to participate in the Consumer Electronics Show (CES Las Vegas 2025).
