= Aaron Johnson (ice hockey) =

Canadian ice hockey player

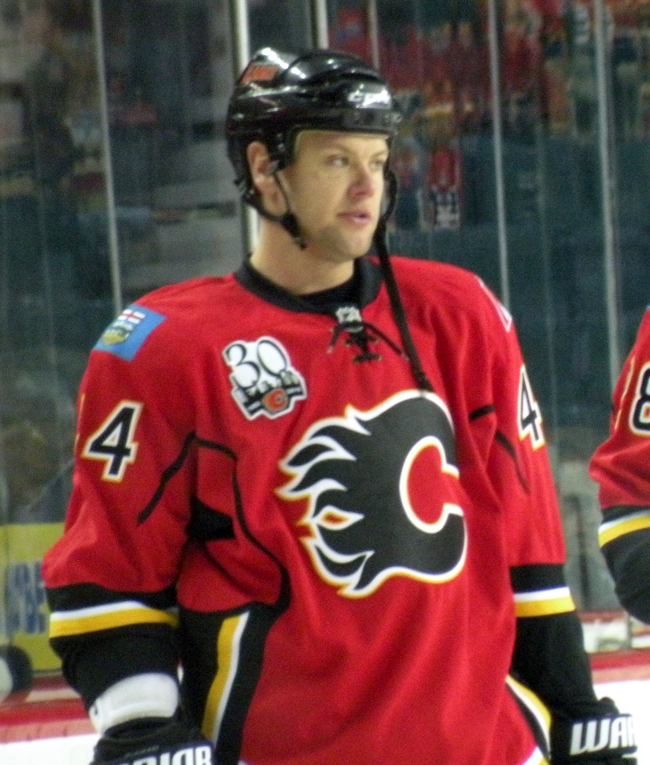
- Johnson with the Calgary Flames in 2009
- Born: April 30, 1983 (age 43) Port Hawkesbury, Nova Scotia, Canada
- Height: 6 ft 1 in (185 cm)
- Weight: 204 lb (93 kg; 14 st 8 lb)
- Position: Defence
- Shot: Left
- Played for: Columbus Blue Jackets; New York Islanders; Chicago Blackhawks; Calgary Flames; Edmonton Oilers; Boston Bruins; Adler Mannheim; Sheffield Steelers
- NHL draft: 85th overall, 2001; Columbus Blue Jackets
- Playing career: 2003–2021

Aaron Lindsay Johnson (born April 30, 1983) is a Canadian former professional ice hockey defenceman. Johnson last played under contract with the Sheffield Steelers in the Elite Ice Hockey League (EIHL). Since 2021, he has worked as a team relations specialist for the NHL's Columbus Blue Jackets.

He was a third-round selection of the Columbus Blue Jackets, 85th overall, at the 2001 NHL entry draft. A journeyman, Johnson has played for the Blue Jackets, New York Islanders, Chicago Blackhawks, Calgary Flames, Edmonton Oilers and Boston Bruins in the NHL, and several minor league teams during his career. He was a member of the Memorial Cup champion Rimouski Océanic in 2000.

== Playing career ==
Johnson played four seasons of junior hockey in the Quebec Major Junior Hockey League (QMJHL) between 1999 and 2003. He played primarily for the Rimouski Océanic but finished his junior career with the Quebec Remparts. He had 40 goals and 195 points in 252 games as a junior. He was a member of Rimouski's President's Cup championship team that defeated the Hull Olympiques in the final. Johnson appeared in one game at the 2001 Memorial Cup tournament as Rimouski went on to win the Canadian Hockey League championship.

The Columbus Blue Jackets selected Johnson with their third round selection, 85th overall, at the 2001 NHL entry draft. He was assigned to the American Hockey League (AHL)'s Syracuse Crunch upon turning professional in 2003, but appeared in 29 games with the Blue Jackets in the 2003–04 NHL season. He made his NHL debut on December 2, 2003, against the Anaheim Ducks and earned his first NHL point with an assist two nights later against the Nashville Predators. He spent the majority of the following two seasons with the Crunch, but appeared in 26 games with Columbus in 2005–06 before earning a regular role with the team the following year, a season in which he scored three goals and 10 points in 61 games.

Johnson left Columbus as a free agent, signing with the New York Islanders for the 2007–08 season. He appeared in 30 games for the Islanders, but missed 35 more due to a knee injury. Allowed to go again to free agency, Johnson frequently switched teams as a journeyman defenceman. He signed with the Chicago Blackhawks for 2008–09 with whom he appeared in 35 games. Chicago traded Johnson to the Calgary Flames on October 7, 2009, in exchange for Kyle Greentree. A series of injuries to Calgary's defencemen gave Johnson an opportunity to play, but he was on the move again after 22 games with the Flames.

Calgary sent Johnson to the Edmonton Oilers, along with a draft pick, in exchange for Steve Staios on March 3, 2010. The trade was notable for being the first time the two Battle of Alberta rivals completed a trade in the Flames' 30-year history. Johnson appeared in 19 games for the Oilers and recorded seven points. Leaving the Oilers, Johnson played the entire 2010–11 season in the AHL with the Milwaukee Admirals, before returning to the Blue Jackets for the 2011–12 season where he recorded a career high 16 points in 56 games. Following a ten-game stint with the Boston Bruins in 2012–13, Johnson signed with the New York Rangers for the 2013–14 season. He was assigned to their AHL affiliate, the Hartford Wolf Pack and named the team captain. Hartford was the 12th different team Johnson played for in his professional career.

On July 3, 2014, Johnson left the Rangers organization after one season and agreed to a one-year contract as a free agent with the Ottawa Senators. He was assigned to their AHL affiliate the Binghamton Senators, where he was also named captain.

On September 25, 2015, Johnson returned to the Calgary Flames organization as a free agent, agreeing to a one-year AHL contract with their affiliate, the Stockton Heat.

On June 17, 2016, Johnson signed his first contract overseas, a one-year contract with Adler Mannheim of the German top-tier Deutsche Eishockey Liga (DEL). On March 17, 2017, Johnson signed a one-year contract extension with Mannheim.

On July 26, 2018, Johnson left Germany after two years and agreed as a free agent to a two-year deal with English club Sheffield Steelers of the EIHL.

Johnson was due to remain in Sheffield for the 2020-21 season as a player/assistant coach, but the campaign was cancelled due to the coronavirus pandemic. In July 2021, Sheffield confirmed Johnson would not return to the club.

In October 2021, Johnson began working as a team relationship specialist for the NHL team which first drafted him, the Columbus Blue Jackets.

Medal record

Ice hockey

Representing Canada

Spengler Cup
Gold medal – first place	2015 Davos	

== Career statistics ==
			Regular season					Playoffs
Season	Team	League	GP	G	A	Pts	PIM	GP	G	A	Pts	PIM
1998–99	Cape Breton West Eagles AAA	NSMMHL	56	28	42	70	98	—	—	—	—	—
1999–2000	Rimouski Océanic	QMJHL	63	1	14	15	57	8	0	0	0	0
2000–01	Rimouski Océanic	QMJHL	64	12	41	53	128	11	2	4	6	35
2001–02	Rimouski Océanic	QMJHL	68	17	49	66	172	7	1	2	3	12
2002–03	Rimouski Océanic	QMJHL	25	4	20	24	41	—	—	—	—	—
2002–03	Québec Remparts	QMJHL	32	6	31	37	41	11	4	4	8	25
2003–04	Syracuse Crunch	AHL	49	6	15	21	83	7	2	3	5	27
2003–04	Columbus Blue Jackets	NHL	29	2	6	8	32	—	—	—	—	—
2004–05	Syracuse Crunch	AHL	77	6	17	23	140	—	—	—	—	—
2005–06	Syracuse Crunch	AHL	49	5	24	29	122	6	1	3	4	19
2005–06	Columbus Blue Jackets	NHL	26	2	6	8	23	—	—	—	—	—
2006–07	Columbus Blue Jackets	NHL	61	3	7	10	38	—	—	—	—	—
2007–08	New York Islanders	NHL	30	0	2	2	30	—	—	—	—	—
2007–08	Bridgeport Sound Tigers	AHL	2	0	0	0	0	—	—	—	—	—
2008–09	Rockford IceHogs	AHL	2	0	1	1	4	—	—	—	—	—
2008–09	Chicago Blackhawks	NHL	38	3	5	8	33	—	—	—	—	—
2009–10	Calgary Flames	NHL	22	1	2	3	19	—	—	—	—	—
2009–10	Edmonton Oilers	NHL	19	3	4	7	16	—	—	—	—	—
2010–11	Milwaukee Admirals	AHL	72	9	26	35	70	13	1	2	3	16
2011–12	Columbus Blue Jackets	NHL	56	3	13	16	26	—	—	—	—	—
2012–13	Boston Bruins	NHL	10	0	0	0	10	—	—	—	—	—
2012–13	Providence Bruins	AHL	2	0	1	1	2	—	—	—	—	—
2013–14	Hartford Wolf Pack	AHL	75	4	36	40	70	—	—	—	—	—
2014–15	Binghamton Senators	AHL	73	6	29	35	76	—	—	—	—	—
2015–16	Stockton Heat	AHL	28	3	15	18	20	—	—	—	—	—
2016–17	Adler Mannheim	DEL	41	4	15	19	28	4	0	0	0	0
2017–18	Adler Mannheim	DEL	46	1	6	7	18	3	0	1	1	0
2018–19	Sheffield Steelers	EIHL	56	4	19	23	89	2	0	2	2	0
2019–20	Sheffield Steelers	EIHL	17	1	5	6	20	—	—	—	—	—
NHL totals			291	17	45	62	227	—	—	—	—	—
