= Alessandro Chiesa =

Italian computer scientist

Alessandro Chiesa is an Italian computer scientist. He is an associate professor at École Polytechnique Fédérale de Lausanne (EPFL), and a now-adjunct professor at University of California, Berkeley. He has contributed to the field of zero-knowledge proofs, and was a co-founder of Zcash and StarkWare Industries.

== Biography ==
Chiesa was born in Varese, Italy in 1987. He studied math and computer science at MIT, where he earned his SB, MEng and PhD. His PhD was in theory of computation, advised by Silvio Micali at the MIT Computer Science and Artificial Intelligence Laboratory.

Chiesa became an assistant professor at UC Berkeley in 2015. In 2018 he was named in MIT's Innovators Under 35 list. In 2021 he became an associate professor at EPFL.

== Research ==
In 2013, Chiesa coauthored a paper and implementation of TinyRAM, a virtual machine whose execution could be proven using zero-knowledge proofs.

In 2014, Chiesa coauthored the design of Zerocash, which laid the foundation for the Zcash protocol. The work was recognized by the Test of Time Award at the IEEE Symposium on Security and Privacy.

In 2020, Chiesa coauthored the design of Zexe, a related protocol which drew on ideas from Zerocash and extended it to arbitrary computations. The Zexe design became the foundation of a blockchain called Aleo.

== Awards ==
- Google Faculty Research Awards (2018 and 2017)
- Okawa Foundation Research Grant (2020)
- Sloan Research Fellowship (2021)
- IEEE Symposium on Security and Privacy Test-of-Time Award (2024)
- Antonio Feltrinelli Giovani Prize in Information Sciences (2026)
