= StarkWare Industries =

Israeli software company

- Type: Private company
- Industry: blockchain
- Founded: 2018; 8 years ago
- Founders: Eli Ben-Sasson; Uri Kolodny; Michael Riabzev; Alessandro Chiesa
- Headquarters: Netanya, Israel
- Area served: Worldwide
- Key people: Eli Ben-Sasson (CEO & President); Uri Kolodny (former CEO); Oren Katz (COO); Avihu Levy (CPO)
- Products: StarkEx, Cairo, Starknet
- Number of employees: 190
- Website: starkware.co

StarkWare Industries is an Israeli software company that specializes in cryptography. It develops zero-knowledge proof technology that compresses information to address the scalability problem of the blockchain, and works on the Ethereum platform. In May 2022, the company's estimated value was $8 billion, an increase from $2 billion six months earlier.

== History ==
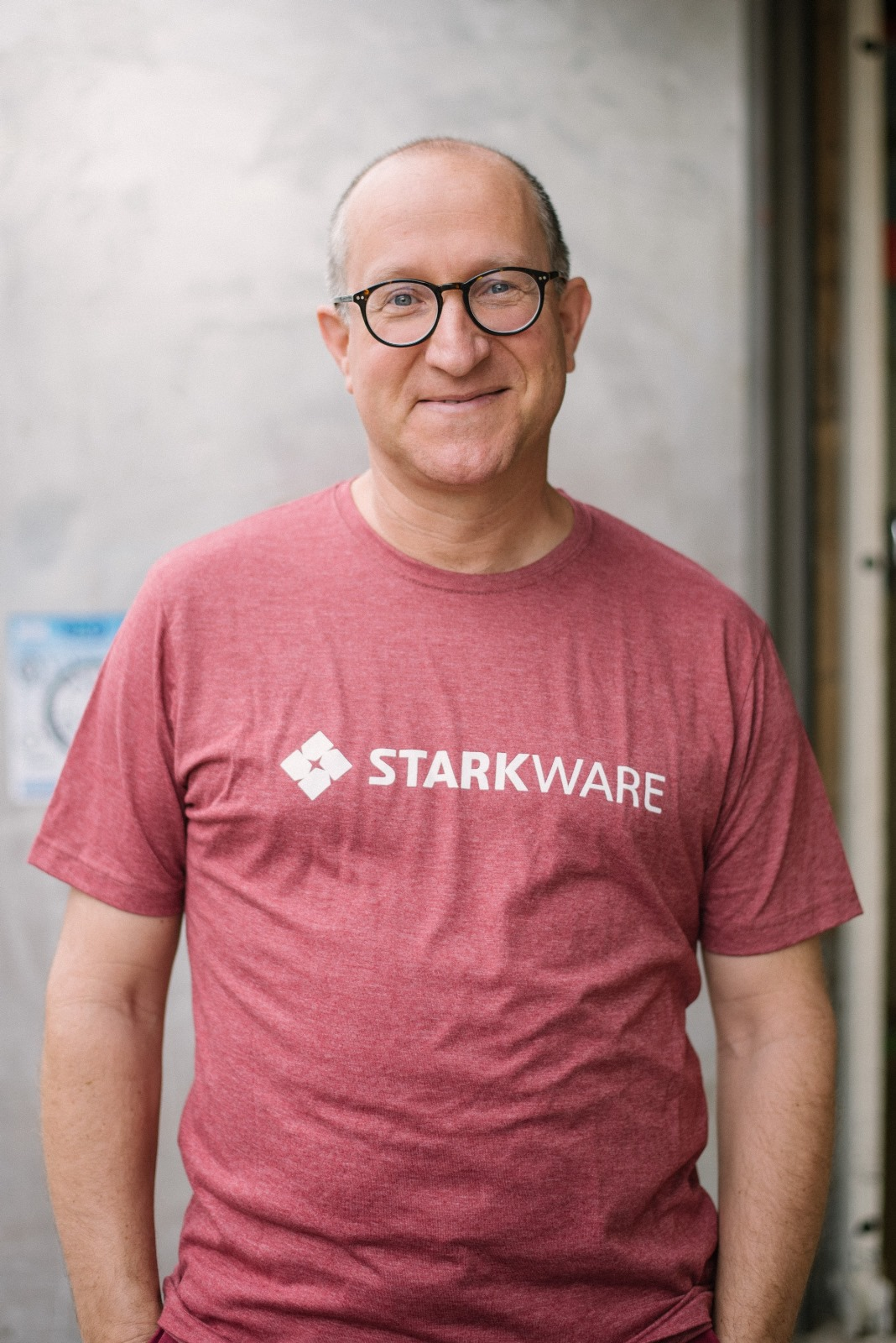
StarkWare Industries founder and CEO Eli Ben-Sasson

StarkWare Industries was founded in 2018 by Eli Ben-Sasson (CEO & President) from the Technion, one of the founders of Zcash, his former phd. student Michael Riabzev, Uri Kolodny (former CEO), and Alessandro Chiesa from UC Berkeley (chief scientist). In April 2019 Technion sued Ben-Sasson and Riabazev for violating its Intellectual property. The institute claimed that Ben-Sasson established StarkWare clandestinely, for his academic research without consent and demand 50% of his stake in the company. Ben-Sasson claimed that he didn't use any invention belonging to the Technion, merely based on StarkWares’ employees' knowledge. In 2020 the two sides reached an agreement and Ben-Sasson left the Technion.

Starkware raised $6 million in seed money and afterward $30 million in series A round led by Paradigm Operations, VC fund by Fred Ehrsam. Other participants were Intel Capital, Sequoia Capital, Coinbase and Vitalik Buterin. In March 2021 the company raised $75 million in series B round. It was led by Paradigm, along with other VCs such as Sequoia, DCVC, Pantera Capital, Wing, Alameda Research, and Founders Fund. In addition it received $12 million from the Ethereum Foundation. In November 2021 StarkWare raised $50 million in a Series C round led by Sequoia, making its total raised money to $163 million and bringing its value to $2 billion, making it a Unicorn. In May 2022 StarkWare raised 100 million in a Series D round led by Greenoaks Capital and Coatue Management, bringing its value to $8 billion. Series D was carried out despite a bear market.

Starkware's scientific advisors include: Avi Wigderson, Shafi Goldwasser, Noam Nisan and Madhu Sudan. The company's advisors Include: Balaji Srinivasan, Joseph Lubin, Naval Ravikant, and Tom Glocer. The company employs 190 people and is located in Netanya.

== Technology ==
Starkware develops technology called STARK, a type of non-interactive zero-knowledge proof, to improve the scalability in the blockchain. It was founded on the basis of a theoretical research conducted by Ben-Sasson and Riabzev and others at the Technion in addition to mathematical models of zero knowledge proofs. The company develops technology based on this math to batch thousands transactions in a single batch, away from the basis layer of Ethereum. Each final update of each batch is written to Ethereum using a file of 80 kilobytes, which acts as a proof for the content in the batch. This compression process increases the amount of data that can be accepted on a block of the blockchain and minimizes the energy needed for each transaction. The energy consumption per transaction reduces by 200,000 times.

StarkWare first offered its technology in the form of StarkEx, a proprietary scaling engine which was launched on Ethereum in June 2020. It is used by Sorare, Dydx, Immutable X, the web browser Opera, and DeversiFi. In June 2021 StarkWare launched its second platform: Starknet. Unlike StarkEx, which is available to clients, Starknet is permissionless. Any developer can use it to build on it their scalable decentralized applications. As of May 2022 there had been 100,000 downloads of developer tools to build on Starknet. StarkWare's systems are programmed in the Cairo language, Turing complete programming language which was built by researchers and engineers from the company.

== See also ==
- List of unicorn startup companies
- Science and technology in Israel
- Silicon Wadi
