= Matthew Lombardi =

Canadian ice hockey player

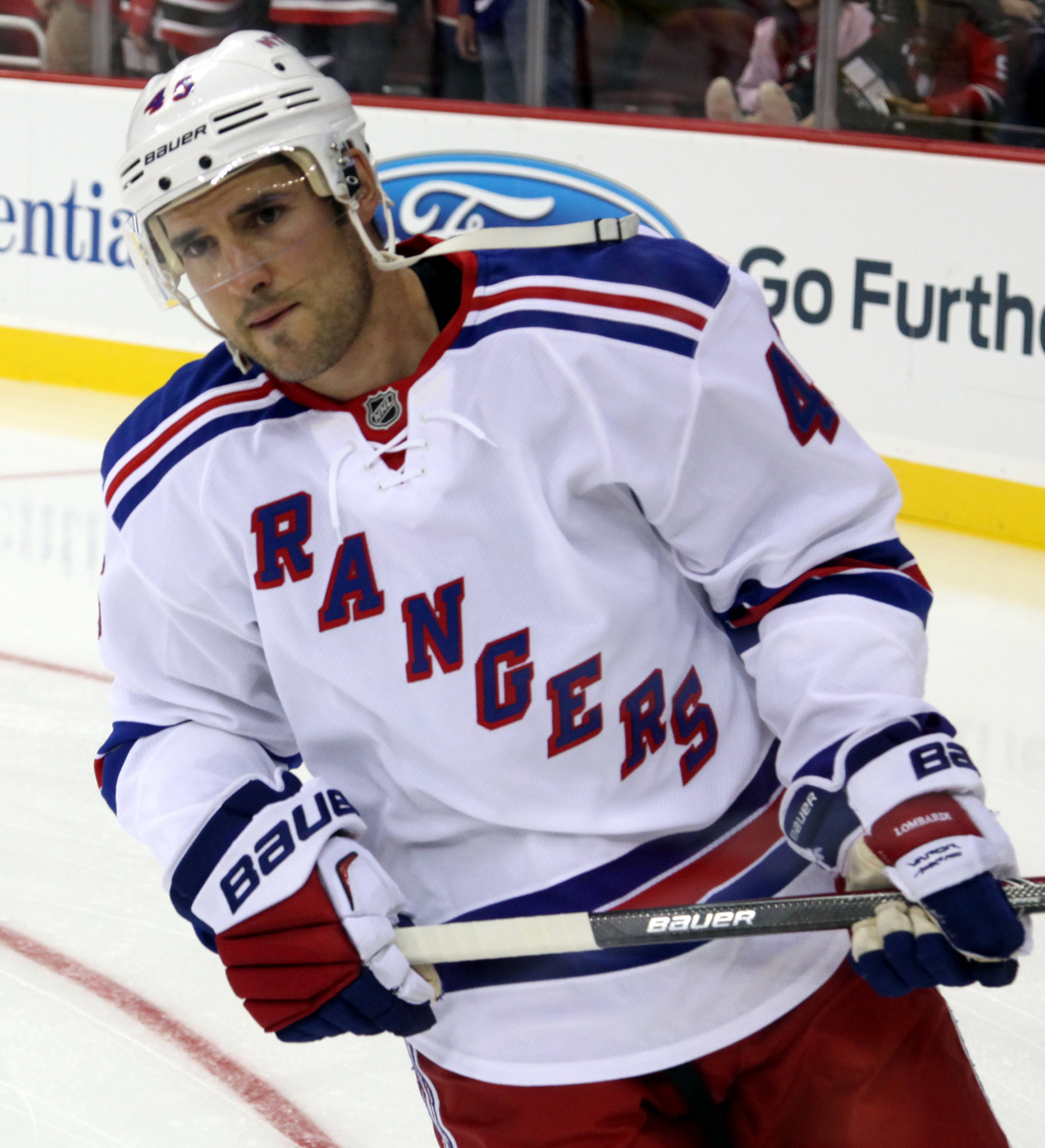
- Lombardi as a Ranger in the 2014 pre-season.
- Born: March 18, 1982 (age 44) Montreal, Quebec, Canada
- Height: 5 ft 11 in (180 cm)
- Weight: 195 lb (88 kg; 13 st 13 lb)
- Position: Centre
- Shot: Left
- Played for: Calgary Flames; Phoenix Coyotes; Nashville Predators; Toronto Maple Leafs; Anaheim Ducks; Genève-Servette HC
- National team: Canada
- NHL draft: 215th overall, 2000; Edmonton Oilers; 90th overall, 2002; Calgary Flames
- Playing career: 2002–2016

Matthew Lombardi (born March 18, 1982) is a Canadian former professional ice hockey center who played in the National Hockey League (NHL) for the Calgary Flames, Phoenix Coyotes, Nashville Predators, Toronto Maple Leafs and Anaheim Ducks. Lombardi made his NHL debut in 2003 and was a member of the Flames' team that went to the 2004 Stanley Cup Finals. During his career he was plagued with injuries, suffering two significant concussions. Lombardi played for Team Canada at the IIHF World Championships, winning gold in 2007 and silver in 2009. While playing in Switzerland, he was named to Team Canada and won the 2015 Spengler Cup. He retired from playing hockey in 2016.

== Playing career ==
Lombardi was born and raised in Hudson, Quebec, a suburb of Montreal, Quebec. As a youth, he played in the 1995 Quebec International Pee-Wee Hockey Tournament with the Lac-Saint-Louis-Ouest minor ice hockey team. He later played hockey for the LaPresqu'ile minor hockey association before playing junior ice hockey for the Victoriaville Tigres in the Quebec Major Junior Hockey League (QMJHL) for four years.

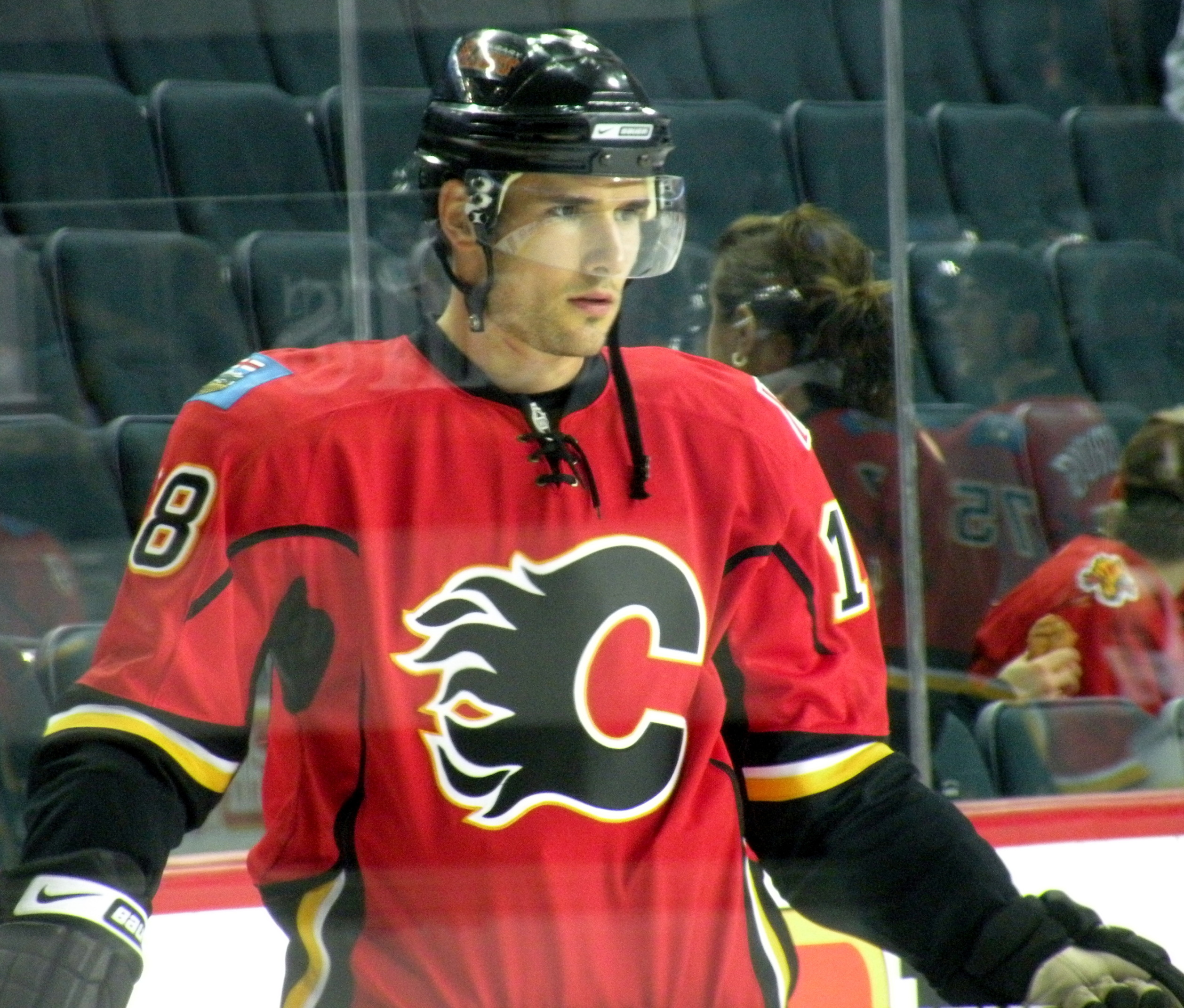
Lombardi while playing for the Calgary Flames

Lombardi was selected in the 2000 NHL entry draft 215th overall by the Edmonton Oilers. Lombardi failed to sign with the Oilers, re-entering the draft where he was picked 90th overall by the Calgary Flames in the 2002 NHL entry draft. Lombardi was known for his speed and good two-way play. Lombardi made his NHL debut during the 2003–04 season after making the team out of training camp. He scored his first goal on October 21, 2003, against Dwayne Roloson of the Minnesota Wild in a 3–2 win while playing on the first line with Jarome Iginla and Steven Reinprecht. He finished the season scoring 16 goals and 29 points. Lombardi played in the 2004 Stanley Cup Playoffs. He played in 13 games, registering 4 points before suffering a vicious elbow to the head from Red Wings defenceman Derian Hatcher in Game 6 of the Western Conference semifinals. Lombardi finished the game but never returned in the playoffs. Hatcher received a three-game suspension. The Flames eventually lost to the Tampa Bay Lightning in Game Seven of the Stanley Cup Finals.

During the locked-out 2004–05 season, he played for the Flames affiliate Lowell Lock Monsters in the American Hockey League (AHL), after he recovered fully from his head injury. Lombardi returned to the NHL and the Flames when the league resumed play in 2005–06. At the beginning of the 2006–07 season, Lombardi's jersey was retired by the Victoriaville Tigres on October 17, 2006, as part of the team's 20th anniversary celebrations. Lombardi registered 20 goals and 46 points with the Flames that season.

He was a member of the 2007 Canadian IIHF World Championship team that won gold. During the tournament he led Team Canada in scoring with six goals and 12 points. In the 2007 offseason, Lombardi signed a three-year extension with Calgary. Lombardi's scoring slumped during the 2007–08 season, leading to calls for increased production from the forward. During the 2008–09 season, Lombardi was slotted in as the team's second line center. Lombardi missed a month of the season with a shoulder injury. On March 4, 2009, trade deadline day in the NHL, Lombardi was traded along with Brandon Prust and a first-round draft pick to the Phoenix Coyotes in exchange for center Olli Jokinen and a third-round draft pick. At the time of the trade, Lombardi had scored nine goals and 30 points in 50 games with the Flames.

The Coyotes sought to get younger and sought ought Lombardi's speed. Lombardi finished the season with five goals and 16 points in the 19 games with the Coyotes. At the end of the season, Lombardi was among the Coyotes players that took part in the 2009 IIHF World Championship in Switzerland. Team Canada won silver at the tournament. The following season Lombardi scored a career high 19 goals and 53 points. On February 8, 2010, he recorded a five-point night in a 6–1 win over the Edmonton Oilers.

On July 2, 2010, as an unrestricted free agent from the Coyotes, Lombardi signed a three-year contract with the Nashville Predators. In the first year of the contract Lombardi played only two games, due to a concussion suffered during the first period of an October 13 game against the Chicago Blackhawks. Due to internal cap restrictions on July 3, 2011, he was traded along with Cody Franson by the Predators to the Toronto Maple Leafs for Brett Lebda and Robert Slaney. In the 2011–12 season, on October 6, 2011, he made his return from concussion and played in his first game as a member of the Maple Leafs, scoring the game-winning goal against the Montreal Canadiens. In November, Lombardi missed time with a dislocated shoulder. In 62 games with the Maple Leafs, he scored eight goals and 18 points.

Prior to the lockout shortened 2012–13 season, he was traded by the Leafs back to the Phoenix Coyotes for a conditional draft pick on January 16, 2013, as the Coyotes sought to improve their depth at center. Again missing time due to injury due to another shoulder injury and failing to recapture his previous scoring presence with the Coyotes, Lombardi was again on the move at the trade deadline when he was dealt to the Anaheim Ducks in exchange for Brandon McMillan on April 3, 2013. In 21 games with Phoenix, he had four goals and eight points.

On August 29, 2013, he signed his first contract abroad on a one-year deal with Swiss club, Genève-Servette HC of the National League A. In the 2013–14 season with Geneva, Lombardi regained his scoring touch, scoring 20 goals and 50 points in only 46 games, leading his team in scoring and finishing sixth in the league.

On July 16, 2014, Lombardi returned to the NHL after gaining interest from the New York Rangers, signing a two-year deal worth $1.6 million. Lombardi failed to make the team out of training camp and was assigned to the Hartford Wolf Pack, the team's AHL affiliate, after clearing waivers. Lombardi refused to report to the Wolf Pack and was released by the organization after passing unconditional waivers.

On October 13, 2014, Genève-Servette, the team where Lombardi had played for the 2013–14 season, announced that he would be re-joining their team for the 2014–15 season. In 2015, Lombardi played for Team Canada at the Spengler Cup. Team Canada won the Spengler Cup after defeating HC Lugano 4–3 in the final.

After playing 15 professional seasons, Lombardi made his retirement official on November 24, 2016.

== Career statistics ==
=== Regular season and playoffs ===
| | | | Regular season | | | | | Playoffs |
| Season | Team | League | GP | G | A | Pts | PIM | GP | G | A | Pts | PIM |
|---|---|---|---|---|---|---|---|---|---|---|---|---|
| 1997–98 | Gatineau L'Intrépide | QMAAA | 42 | 10 | 13 | 23 | | 13 | 4 | 7 | 11 |
| 1998–99 | Victoriaville Tigres | QMJHL | 47 | 6 | 10 | 16 | 8 | 5 | 0 | 0 | 0 | 0 |
| 1999–00 | Victoriaville Tigres | QMJHL | 65 | 18 | 26 | 44 | 28 | 6 | 0 | 0 | 0 | 6 |
| 2000–01 | Victoriaville Tigres | QMJHL | 72 | 28 | 39 | 67 | 66 | 13 | 12 | 6 | 18 | 10 |
| 2001–02 | Victoriaville Tigres | QMJHL | 66 | 57 | 73 | 130 | 70 | 22 | 17 | 18 | 35 | 18 |
| 2002–03 | Saint John Flames | AHL | 76 | 25 | 21 | 46 | 41 | — | — | — | — | — |
| 2003–04 | Calgary Flames | NHL | 79 | 16 | 13 | 29 | 32 | 13 | 1 | 5 | 6 | 4 |
| 2004–05 | Lowell Lock Monsters | AHL | 9 | 3 | 1 | 4 | 9 | 11 | 0 | 3 | 3 | 16 |
| 2005–06 | Omaha Ak–Sar–Ben Knights | AHL | 1 | 1 | 1 | 2 | 0 | — | — | — | — | — |
| 2005–06 | Calgary Flames | NHL | 55 | 6 | 20 | 26 | 48 | 7 | 0 | 2 | 2 | 2 |
| 2006–07 | Calgary Flames | NHL | 81 | 20 | 26 | 46 | 48 | 6 | 1 | 1 | 2 | 0 |
| 2007–08 | Calgary Flames | NHL | 82 | 14 | 22 | 36 | 67 | 7 | 0 | 0 | 0 | 4 |
| 2008–09 | Calgary Flames | NHL | 50 | 9 | 21 | 30 | 30 | — | — | — | — | — |
| 2008–09 | Phoenix Coyotes | NHL | 19 | 5 | 11 | 16 | 14 | — | — | — | — | — |
| 2009–10 | Phoenix Coyotes | NHL | 78 | 19 | 34 | 53 | 36 | 7 | 1 | 5 | 6 | 2 |
| 2010–11 | Nashville Predators | NHL | 2 | 0 | 0 | 0 | 0 | — | — | — | — | — |
| 2011–12 | Toronto Maple Leafs | NHL | 62 | 8 | 10 | 18 | 10 | — | — | — | — | — |
| 2012–13 | Phoenix Coyotes | NHL | 21 | 4 | 4 | 8 | 4 | — | — | — | — | — |
| 2012–13 | Anaheim Ducks | NHL | 7 | 0 | 0 | 0 | 4 | — | — | — | — | — |
| 2013–14 | Genève–Servette HC | NLA | 46 | 20 | 30 | 50 | 54 | 12 | 3 | 6 | 9 | 12 |
| 2014–15 | Genève–Servette HC | NLA | 19 | 6 | 11 | 17 | 8 | 1 | 0 | 1 | 1 | 0 |
| 2015–16 | Genève–Servette HC | NLA | 34 | 6 | 11 | 17 | 14 | 11 | 1 | 1 | 2 | 2 |
| NHL totals | | | 536 | 101 | 161 | 262 | 293 | 40 | 3 | 13 | 16 | 12 |
| NLA totals | | | 99 | 32 | 52 | 84 | 76 | 24 | 4 | 8 | 12 | 14 |

=== International ===
Medal record

Ice hockey

Representing Canada

World Championships
| Gold medal – first place | 2007 Moscow | |
| Silver medal – second place | 2009 Bern | |

Spengler Cup
| Gold medal – first place | 2015 Davos | |

| Year | Team | Event | Result | GP | G | A | Pts | PIM |
|---|---|---|---|---|---|---|---|---|
| 2007 | Canada | WC | 1st place, gold medalist(s) | 9 | 6 | 6 | 12 | 4 |
| 2009 | Canada | WC | 2nd place, silver medalist(s) | 9 | 2 | 2 | 4 | 6 |
| Senior totals | | | | 18 | 8 | 8 | 16 | 10 |
