= Greg Kimmerly =

Canadian ice hockey referee

- Born: December 8, 1964 (age 61); Toronto, Ontario
- Occupation: NHL Referee
- Years active: 1993 - 2016

Greg Kimmerly (born December 8, 1964, in Toronto, Ontario) is a retired National Hockey League referee who is currently the Director of Officiating in the Elite Ice Hockey League. Kimmerly was an NHL official from the 1993-94 NHL season to 2016, his final game being the Detroit Red Wings vs Toronto Maple Leafs on April 2, 2016. Kimmerly wore the number 18.

Kimmerly is currently the Director of Officiating in the UK's EIHL.
