= Sorare =

Fantasy sport blockchain game

- Developers: Nicolas Julia and Adrien Montfort
- Publisher: Sorare
- Platforms: Android, iOS, web browsers
- Release: 2019
- Genre: Sports management game

Sorare is a fantasy sport digital trading card game centered around real-world sports data. The game allows players to build virtual teams using digital player cards representing real professional athletes and to compete in tournaments whose outcomes are based on real-world match performances. As of 2026, there are three sports in Sorare : football, basketball, and baseball. It is available for Android, iOS and web browsers.

== Gameplay ==
In Sorare, players—referred to as managers—compose virtual teams made up of five player cards, corresponding to specific positions depending on the sport. Each card represents a real professional athlete.

Teams are ranked based on the real-world performances of the selected players during official matches. Player scores are calculated using match statistics provided by third-party data providers such as Opta and processed through a scoring matrix defined by Sorare. Users keep the same players on their team every season, unless they choose to trade, drop, or sign new ones.

The primary gameplay mode consists of competitions organized as tournaments. Managers enter teams that must meet predefined criteria, such as card scarcity or league coverage. Entry-level tournaments can be played using free cards, while other competitions are restricted to cards of higher scarcity. Some of the cards are digital collectibles (limited, rare, super-rare, and unique cards). These cards are Non-Fungible Tokens (NFTs) so they cannot be duplicated.

Players can participate in multiple competitions per week. Each competition period, referred to as a game week, typically runs from Tuesday to Friday or from Friday to Tuesday, depending on the sport and competition schedule. Game activity follows the calendar of real-world sporting events.

== Licensing and partnerships ==
Sorare has signed licensing deals with leagues, such as the K League and clubs such as Real Madrid, to allow the cards to have official branding, and to use player photos and names.

On May 12, 2022, Sorare signed a partnership with Major League Baseball to continue to develop sports on its platform. The launch of the game based on baseball and MLB was made on July 19, 2022.

In September 2022, Sorare signed a multi-year deal with the National Basketball Association (NBA) and the National Basketball Players Association (NBPA).

In November 2022, Lionel Messi joined Sorare as an investor and brand ambassador. Other investors include Kylian Mbappé and Serena Williams.

On January 30, 2023, Sorare signed a partnership with the English Premier League for the purchase and use of official Premier League-licensed NFTs.

== Technical infrastructure ==
The platform uses blockchain technology to manage digital player cards, ensuring their scarcity, traceability, and ownership. Sorare was initially built on the Ethereum blockchain and migrated much of its infrastructure to Solana in 2025.

Originally built on the Ethereum mainnet, the platform migrated most of its transactions to StarkEx, a zero-knowledge rollup (Layer 2) developed by StarkWare, in July 2021 to reduce the environmental impact.

In October 2025, the company transitioned to a multichain infrastructure to improve scalability and interoperability. This migration involved two primary components:

- Solana (NFTs): All digital player cards were bridged from StarkEx to the Solana blockchain using the compressed NFT (cNFT) standard. This move was intended to leverage Solana’s high throughput (up to 65,000 transactions per second) and sub-second finality, allowing cards to be used within the broader Solana ecosystem, including third-party wallets like Phantom and external marketplaces.
- Base (ETH Balances): While the NFTs moved to Solana, Sorare migrated its users' Ethereum (ETH) balances to Base, an Ethereum Layer 2 network incubated by Coinbase. This allowed the platform to maintain its link to the Ethereum ecosystem while it is still possible for users to trade in ETH.

The platform has a non-custodial wallet model where each user's Sorare wallet maps to specific addresses on both Solana and Base, derived from the same private key.

== Finance ==
In May 2019, the company announced a pre-seed round of €550,000, including the technology entrepreneur Xavier Niel.

In July 2020, the company raised $4 million with German football World Cup champion André Schürrle, among others. In December 2020, the company raised another €3.5 million with World Cup champion Gerard Piqué, among others.

In September 2021, the company raised $680 million Series B round, which valued the company at $4.3 billion. Also in September, Sorare formalized an agreement with the Spanish football league for a multi-year partnership. The agreement covers the edition of virtual cards for players playing in La Liga and Liga.

== Regulation ==
Sorare’s activities have prompted regulatory discussions in several countries due to its use of exchangeable digital objects and competitive reward mechanisms.

In France, the national gambling regulator issued a notice in July 2022 indicating that it was assessing whether certain aspects of the platform fell under gambling regulations. Subsequently, France adopted a legal framework governing games that use monetizable digital objects, known as the “JONUM” law (Jeux à Objets Numériques Monétisables), which distinguishes such games from gambling activities. France submitted the JONUM law for EU-wide regulatory review in 2023.

In the United Kingdom, the UK Gambling Commission (UKGC) charged Sorare on September 26, 2024, the first time the UKGC had pursued a prosecution against a major "Web3" or NFT-based platform. As of March 2026, the case is ongoing.

Within this evolving regulatory framework, Sorare has stated that it has adjusted certain elements of its product to align with applicable legal requirements, and has introduced several measures to align with broader regulatory expectations:

- Strict Identity Verification (KYC): Enhanced verification is now required for all UK users to prevent underage access (18+).
- Risk Disclosures: The platform now features clearer warnings regarding the volatility of digital assets and the risks of excessive play.
- Self-Exclusion Tools: Introduction of tools similar to those found on regulated gambling sites, allowing users to limit their spending or take breaks.

Regulatory authorities have indicated that the framework remains subject to ongoing monitoring as digital game models continue to evolve. The Autorité Nationale des Jeux (ANJ), the French gambling regulator. established a three-year experimental period (2024–2027) to evaluate how digital game models evolve and to adjust regulations accordingly. The implementing Decree No. 2026-60 was signed on February 4, 2026, officially launching the "probationary" period for JONUM operators. The ANJ has stated that this period allows them to track "behavioral risk indicators" and "reward distribution data" to ensure the models do not drift into traditional gambling.
