= Matt D'Agostini =

Canadian ice hockey player (born 1986)

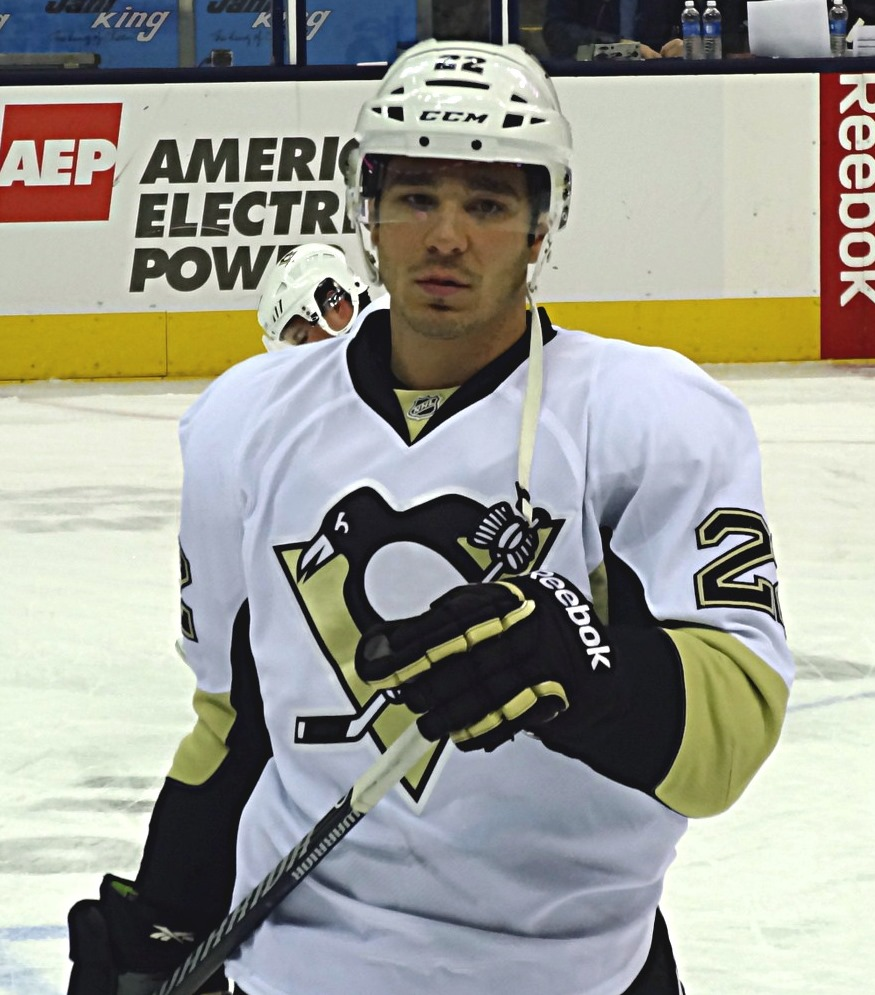
- Born: October 23, 1986 (age 40) Sault Ste. Marie, Ontario, Canada
- Height: 6 ft 0 in (183 cm)
- Weight: 201 lb (91 kg; 14 st 5 lb)
- Position: Right wing
- Shot: Right
- Played for: Montreal Canadiens; St. Louis Blues; New Jersey Devils; SC Riessersee; Pittsburgh Penguins; Buffalo Sabres; Genève-Servette HC; HC Ambrì-Piotta
- NHL draft: 190th overall, 2005; Montreal Canadiens
- Playing career: 2006–2022

Matthew Vincent D'Agostini (born October 23, 1986) is a Canadian former professional ice hockey right winger who is the development coach for the St. Louis Blues of the National Hockey League (NHL). He was selected in the sixth round, 190th overall, by the Montreal Canadiens in the 2005 NHL entry draft. D'Agostini also played for the Buffalo Sabres, New Jersey Devils, Pittsburgh Penguins, and St. Louis Blues.

== Playing career ==
D'Agostini began his Midget age career with the Root River Rangers, a midget AA team from Sault Ste. Marie. After one season with the Rangers, he played one year Midget AAA for the Soo North Stars. The following year he was selected as a walk-on player by the Guelph Storm.

On April 2, 2008, Montreal recalled D'Agostini from the Hamilton Bulldogs of the American Hockey League (AHL). He played his first NHL game on April 3, 2008 against the Buffalo Sabres. He scored his first career goal on December 2, 2008 against the Atlanta Thrashers. On December 4, D'Agostini recorded his first NHL assist against the New York Rangers.

On August 14, 2009, the Canadiens signed D'Agostini to a one-year contract extension. During the 2010–11 season, on March 2, 2010, Montreal traded D'Agostini to the St. Louis Blues for Aaron Palushaj.

As free agency approached, on July 1, 2011, the Blues re-signed D'Agostini to a two-year contract.

As a result of the NHL lockout at the start of the 2012–13 season, D'Agostini signed a two-month contract with SC Riessersee, from the resort town of Garmisch-Partenkirchen, playing in the German 2nd Bundesliga, on October 10, 2012. After 10 games with Riessersee, D'Agostini returned to the Blues in order for the start of the shortened NHL season.

A frequent healthy scratch, appearing in only 16 games with the Blues, D'Agostini was traded to the New Jersey Devils along with a conditional 7th round pick in exchange for a conditional 4th or 5th Round pick in the 2015 NHL Entry Draft on March 22, 2013.

New Jersey released D'Agostini at season's end and on July 10, 2013, Pittsburgh Penguins signed him as a free agent to a one-year contract at the league minimum.

After participating in just 8 games in the opening months of the 2013–14 season, the Penguins placed D'agostini on waivers. He was claimed by the Buffalo Sabres on November 27, 2013.

Released by the Sabres, with no NHL clubs interested in acquiring him, D'Agostini signed a one-year contract on July 18, 2014, to play for Genève-Servette HC of the National League (NL). He played 40 games (14 goals, 23 assists) in the 2014–15 regular season followed by twelve postseason contests with seven goals and three assists. He was then signed to a two-year contract, making him an Eagle through the end of the 2016/17 season. In the 2015–16 season, D'Agostini tallied 20 goals and 20 assists in 46 regular season games. He chipped in with three goals and two assists in the playoffs (seven appearances).

On May 31, 2016, he was shipped to HC Ambrì-Piotta of the NL, despite one year remaining on his contract with Geneva. On July 27, 2017, D'Agostini signed a one-year contract extension with the Biancoblu. On March 7, 2018, D'Agostini agreed to an early one-year contract extension through the 2018–19 season. At the conclusion of the 18/19 season, he was signed to a new one-year contract extension on April 24, 2019. On May 22, 2020, D'Agostini agreed to a two-year contract extension with Ambri-Piotta through the 2021–22 season.

== International play ==
Medal record

Ice hockey

Representing Canada

Spengler Cup
Gold medal – first place	2015 Davos	
Gold medal – first place	2017 Davos	

He won the 2015 Spengler Cup with Team Canada, scoring the winning goal in the final against HC Lugano.

== Career statistics ==
			Regular season					Playoffs
Season	Team	League	GP	G	A	Pts	PIM	GP	G	A	Pts	PIM
2002–03	Root River Rangers	U18 AA	—	—	—	—	—	—	—	—	—	—
2003–04	Soo North Stars	GNML	2	0	1	1	0	—	—	—	—	—
2003–04	Soo North Stars	GNML	36	36	23	59	41	9	11	7	18	6
2004–05	Guelph Storm	OHL	59	24	22	46	29	4	0	2	2	8
2005–06	Guelph Storm	OHL	66	25	54	79	81	15	8	20	28	16
2006–07	Hamilton Bulldogs	AHL	63	21	28	49	33	22	4	9	13	8
2007–08	Hamilton Bulldogs	AHL	76	23	30	53	38	—	—	—	—	—
2007–08	Montreal Canadiens	NHL	1	0	0	0	2	—	—	—	—	—
2008–09	Hamilton Bulldogs	AHL	20	14	11	25	16	—	—	—	—	—
2008–09	Montreal Canadiens	NHL	53	12	9	21	16	3	0	0	0	0
2009–10	Montreal Canadiens	NHL	40	2	2	4	26	—	—	—	—	—
2009–10	Hamilton Bulldogs	AHL	3	0	1	1	2	—	—	—	—	—
2009–10	St. Louis Blues	NHL	7	0	0	0	2	—	—	—	—	—
2010–11	St. Louis Blues	NHL	82	21	25	46	40	—	—	—	—	—
2011–12	St. Louis Blues	NHL	55	9	9	18	27	4	1	0	1	4
2012–13	SC Riessersee	2.GBun	10	2	6	8	6	—	—	—	—	—
2012–13	St. Louis Blues	NHL	16	1	1	2	2	—	—	—	—	—
2012–13	New Jersey Devils	NHL	13	2	2	4	6	—	—	—	—	—
2013–14	Pittsburgh Penguins	NHL	8	0	1	1	4	—	—	—	—	—
2013–14	Buffalo Sabres	NHL	49	5	6	11	22	—	—	—	—	—
2014–15	Genève–Servette HC	NLA	40	14	23	37	30	12	7	3	10	8
2015–16	Genève–Servette HC	NLA	46	20	20	40	47	7	3	2	5	6
2016–17	HC Ambrì–Piotta	NLA	23	5	4	9	24	—	—	—	—	—
2017–18	HC Ambrì–Piotta	NL	47	19	22	41	86	—	—	—	—	—
2018–19	HC Ambrì–Piotta	NL	37	14	16	30	14	5	0	0	0	4
2019–20	HC Ambrì–Piotta	NL	46	20	22	42	26	—	—	—	—	—
2020–21	HC Ambrì–Piotta	NL	8	2	2	4	6	—	—	—	—	—
2021–22	HC Ambrì–Piotta	NL	21	4	3	7	2	2	0	0	0	2
2021–22	HCB Ticino Rockets	SL	2	0	5	5	0	—	—	—	—	—
NHL totals			324	52	55	107	147	7	1	0	1	4
NL totals			268	98	112	210	235	26	10	5	15	20
