= Sergei Yemelin =

Russian ice hockey player

- Born: May 1, 1991 (age 34) Ufa, Russian SFSR, Soviet Union
- Height: 6 ft 0 in (183 cm)
- Weight: 165 lb (75 kg; 11 st 11 lb)
- Position: Forward
- Shoots: Left
- VHL team Former teams: Toros Neftekamsk; Salavat Yulaev Ufa; Metallurg Novokuznetsk; Avtomobilist Yekaterinburg
- Playing career: 2011–present

Sergei Seregeyevich Yemelin (Russian: Сергей Сергеевич Емелин; born May 1, 1991) is a Russian professional ice hockey player. He is currently under contract with Toros Neftekamsk of the Supreme Hockey League (VHL).

Yemelin made his Kontinental Hockey League (KHL) debut playing with Salavat Yulaev Ufa during the 2011–12 KHL season.
