= Zcash =

Cryptocurrency aimed at privacy

Denominations
- Code: ZEC

Development
- White paper: Zcash Protocol Specification
- Initial release: 28 October 2016; 9 years ago
- Latest release: 6.11.0 / 10 January 2026; 9 months ago
- Code repository: github.com/zcash/zcash
- Development status: Active
- Project fork of: Bitcoin Core
- Written in: C++ and Rust (zcashd), Python (zcashd test suite), Rust (zebra), Kotlin (Android SDK), Swift (iOS SDK), Go (lightwalletd)
- Operating system: Linux, Windows, macOS
- Developer(s): Electric Coin Company (zcashd); Zcash Foundation (zebra)
- Source model: Open source
- License: MIT (main zcashd code); MIT/Apache (zebra and some support libraries); BOSL (orchard)

Ledger
- Hash function: Equihash
- Issuance schedule: Similar to Bitcoin, with "slow start" and different block interval
- Block reward: 3.125 ZEC (80% to miners; 20% is portioned out to a Major Grants Fund (8%), Electric Coin Co (7%), and the Zcash Foundation (5%)), from Canopy upgrade until first halving
- Block time: 75 seconds (post-Blossom upgrade)
- Supply limit: 21,000,000

Website
- Website: z.cash

Zcash is a privacy-focused cryptocurrency which features an encrypted ledger using zero-knowledge proofs.

Launched in October 2016, Zcash was developed by cryptographers at Johns Hopkins University and MIT and derived its code from bitcoin. Zcash was one of the first large-scale implementations of zero-knowledge proofs outside of academia.

== Design ==
Zcash is modeled on bitcoin, sharing its proof-of-work consensus mechanism.

In 2016, Tom Robinson, co-founder of blockchain tracing firm Elliptic, told CNBC that Zcash appeared to have achieved a high level of anonymity.

Zcash supports two types of addresses: transparent addresses, which function similarly to bitcoin addresses with publicly visible transactions, and shielded addresses, which use zero-knowledge proofs to encrypt transaction data. Shielded transactions can be verified as valid without revealing the sender, recipient, or amount transferred. Users can transact between the two types, allowing funds to move between the transparent and shielded pools.

This optional privacy model is intended to preserve fungibility, allowing units of the currency to be treated equally regardless of their transaction history. Users also have the option to share private viewing keys, allowing designated third parties to see their transaction details for auditing purposes. A 2018 study found that while it is possible to use Zcash privately, the anonymity set of the shielded pool could be reduced through heuristics-based analysis of usage patterns. The analysis predates subsequent protocol upgrades to the shielded transaction system.

In 2022, journalist Andy Greenberg described Zcash's shielded transactions as "provably inaccessible" to surveillance and said he had not seen evidence that its anonymity could be compromised.

== History ==
Development work on Zcash began in 2013 by Johns Hopkins University professor Matthew Green and his graduate students Ian Miers and Christina Garman, who developed the Zerocoin protocol. They subsequently joined forces with a team of cryptographers including Alessandro Chiesa and Madars Virza from MIT, and Eli Ben-Sasson from the Technion and Eran Tromer from Tel Aviv University, who had developed a more efficient variant called zk-SNARKs. The development was completed by the for-profit Zcash Company, led by Zooko Wilcox, a Colorado based computer security specialist. The Zcash Company raised over $3 million from investors including Naval Ravikant.

Zcash was first mined in late October 2016. To generate revenue, 10% of all coins mined for the first four years were automatically distributed to the Zcash Company and the Zcash Foundation.

The instantiation of the Zcash network required the creation of a master private key. To ensure privacy, this private key must later be destroyed, otherwise counterfeit Zcash coins could be generated. To maximize the chance that no one person could obtain the private key, software was written which allowed individuals from six different locations to collaboratively generate the private key, use it to instantiate Zcash, and then destroy the computers used in the process afterwards. In 2019, Electric Coin Company researcher Sean Bowe discovered Halo, a technique for generating zero-knowledge proofs without requiring a trusted setup ceremony. This eliminated the need for the elaborate multi-party ceremonies used at launch.

In 2018, MIT Technology Review named Zcash co-founder Alessandro Chiesa, an assistant professor at the University of California, Berkeley, to its Innovators Under 35 list for his work on the zero-knowledge proof technology underlying the cryptocurrency.

In 2022, Edward Snowden revealed that he had participated in the creation of Zcash under the pseudonym "John Dobbertin." Other participants in the ceremony included Peter Todd, a Bitcoin Core developer.

On February 21, 2019, the "Zcash Company" announced a rebranding as the Electric Coin Company (ECC). In 2020, the Electric Coin Company transitioned to nonprofit ownership, becoming a wholly owned subsidiary of the Bootstrap Project, a 501(c)(3) organization.

In September 2023, a mining pool named ViaBTC had seized control of over half the hashing power on Zcash. This 51% dominance raised worries about a 51% attack, where they could potentially manipulate transactions and harm the network. In response, Coinbase placed Zcash markets into "limit-only" mode in an effort to prevent significant price swings.

In November 2025, Cameron Winklevoss and Tyler Winklevoss invested $50 million to launch Cypherpunk Technologies, a digital-asset treasury company focused on the cryptocurrency.

In January 2026, the U.S. Securities and Exchange Commission closed a probe into Zcash.

In April 2026, Foundry, one of the largest bitcoin mining pool operators, launched a dedicated Zcash mining pool.

== Usage ==
In 2017, JPMorgan Chase integrated Zcash's zero-knowledge proof technology into its enterprise blockchain platform Quorum to enable confidential transactions for business clients. Fortune reported that Zcash's fundamental technology would be added to the Ethereum network.

In late 2017, Grayscale Investments launched a Zcash investment fund, which is the company's third dedicated cryptocurrency fund after bitcoin and Ethereum Classic. In 2026, Grayscale filed with regulators to convert the fund into an exchange-traded fund.

In May 2018, the New York State Department of Financial Services approved Zcash for trading on Gemini.

The Freedom of the Press Foundation, the Human Rights Foundation, and the Electronic Frontier Foundation have accepted Zcash donations.

=== Crime ===
In 2017, the European Union's law enforcement agency Europol flagged Zcash, along with bitcoin and Monero, for potential use in internet-based crime. The same report noted that Zcash was not known to have a significant criminal following. In 2018, several Japanese exchanges delisted Zcash and other privacy-focused cryptocurrencies citing regulatory pressure following a major exchange hack; the delisted coins had not been involved in the hack.

A 2020 research report by the RAND Corporation examined eight major dark web marketplaces and found that 59% of cryptocurrency mentions were bitcoin and 27% were Monero, compared with less than 1% for Zcash, concluding that there was "little evidence" that privacy coins were preferred by criminals despite their anonymity features. A 2023 analysis of cryptocurrency and crime similarly found that Zcash "featured very rarely on the dark web" compared to Monero.

== See also ==
- Legality of bitcoin by country
- Non-interactive zero-knowledge proof
