= Mathieu Carle =

Canadian ice hockey player (born 1987)

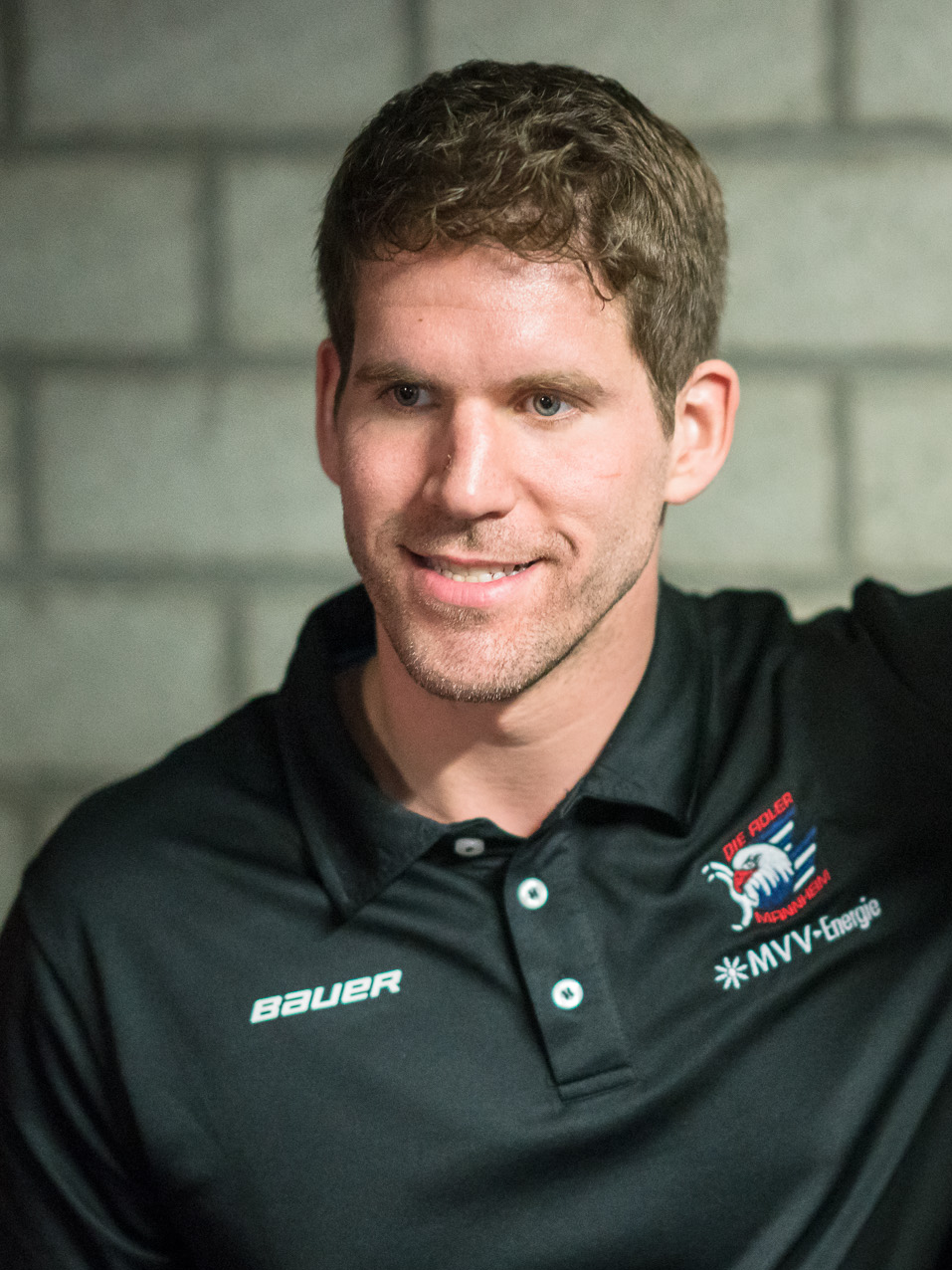
- Carle in 2017
- Born: September 30, 1987 (age 38) Buckingham, Quebec, Canada
- Height: 6 ft 0 in (183 cm)
- Weight: 206 lb (93 kg; 14 st 10 lb)
- Position: Defence
- Shot: Right
- Played for: Montreal Canadiens; Dinamo Riga; Genève-Servette HC; KHL Medveščak Zagreb; Adler Mannheim; EHC Black Wings Linz
- NHL draft: 53rd overall, 2006; Montreal Canadiens
- Playing career: 2007–2019

Louis Philippe Mathieu Carle (born September 30, 1987) is a Canadian former professional ice hockey defenceman. He was selected in the second round, 53rd overall, by the Montreal Canadiens in the 2006 NHL entry draft.

Prior to turning professional, Carle played in the Quebec Major Junior Hockey League (QMJHL) with the Acadie–Bathurst Titan and Rouyn-Noranda Huskies.

== Playing career ==
=== Minor ===
As a youth, Carle played in the 2001 Quebec International Pee-Wee Hockey Tournament with a minor ice hockey team from Gatineau, Quebec.

=== QMJHL ===
Carle was drafted in the first round, 14th overall, by the Acadie–Bathurst Titan in the 2003 Quebec Major Junior Hockey League (QMJHL) Draft. After the 2003–04 season, Carle was named to the QMJHL Rookie All-Star Team.

He stayed with the Titan until 2007 when he was traded to the Rouyn-Noranda Huskies in exchange for Marc-Antoine Desnoyers and two draft picks. Carle signed a three-year entry-level contract with the Montreal Canadiens on May 8, 2007, and participated in the Canadiens' training and development camps before being reassigned to their American Hockey League (AHL) affiliate, the Hamilton Bulldogs, for the 2007–08 season.

=== Professional ===
On September 24, 2008, Carle was knocked unconscious after being hit by Tomáš Kopecký of the Detroit Red Wings in a preseason game. After the hit, he suffered a concussion and was out of the lineup for a month.

In the 2009–10 season on November 3, 2009, Carle was recalled from the Hamilton Bulldogs of the AHL by the Canadiens and made his NHL debut against the Atlanta Thrashers. Carle went scoreless in three games with the Canadiens before returning to the Bulldogs to score 15 points in 31 games before missing 44 games throughout the season to injury. Carle was then re-signed by Montreal to a one-year contract on July 13, 2010.

On July 15, 2011, he was traded from Montreal to Anaheim for defensemen Mark Mitera. After spending the duration of the 2011–12 season with the Ducks' AHL affiliate, the Syracuse Crunch, Carle signed a one-year contract with Latvian club, Dinamo Riga, of the Kontinental Hockey League (KHL) on May 2, 2012. During the 2012-13 season, after 35 games with Riga, Carle was released and signed a contract for the remainder of season with Genève-Servette HC in the Swiss National League A on January 15, 2013.

On July 27, 2013, Carle returned to the KHL and signed one-year contract with newcomers, KHL Medveščak Zagreb of Croatia. After two seasons with Zagreb, Carle signed a two-year contract with German club, Adler Mannheim of the Deutsche Eishockey Liga (DEL) on July 7, 2015.

Following the 2018–19 season, playing with EHC Black Wings Linz in the Austrian Hockey League (EBEL), Carle opted to end his 12-year professional career and return to North America.

== Career statistics ==
=== Regular season and playoffs ===
			Regular season					Playoffs
Season	Team	League	GP	G	A	Pts	PIM	GP	G	A	Pts	PIM
2002–03	Gatineau L'Intrépide	QMAAA	42	11	35	46	52	—	—	—	—	—
2003–04	Acadie–Bathurst Titan	QMJHL	59	11	12	23	57	—	—	—	—	—
2004–05	Acadie–Bathurst Titan	QMJHL	69	4	29	33	53	—	—	—	—	—
2005–06	Acadie–Bathurst Titan	QMJHL	67	18	51	69	122	17	1	14	15	29
2006–07	Acadie–Bathurst Titan	QMJHL	38	12	39	51	52	—	—	—	—	—
2006–07	Rouyn–Noranda Huskies	QMJHL	25	4	15	19	27	16	6	10	16	16
2007–08	Hamilton Bulldogs	AHL	64	7	17	24	43	—	—	—	—	—
2008–09	Hamilton Bulldogs	AHL	59	7	22	29	43	6	0	2	2	4
2009–10	Hamilton Bulldogs	AHL	31	5	10	15	26	1	0	0	0	0
2009–10	Montreal Canadiens	NHL	3	0	0	0	4	—	—	—	—	—
2010–11	Hamilton Bulldogs	AHL	68	11	18	29	44	19	3	9	12	8
2011–12	Syracuse Crunch	AHL	72	6	31	37	41	4	0	3	3	0
2012–13	Dinamo Rīga	KHL	35	3	2	5	39	—	—	—	—	—
2012–13	Genève–Servette HC	NLA	12	0	1	1	2	7	0	3	3	14
2013–14	KHL Medveščak Zagreb	KHL	36	4	13	17	41	—	—	—	—	—
2014–15	KHL Medveščak Zagreb	KHL	45	1	18	19	38	—	—	—	—	—
2015–16	Adler Mannheim	DEL	47	3	21	24	26	2	0	0	0	0
2016–17	Adler Mannheim	DEL	32	4	18	22	10	5	0	0	0	2
2017–18	Adler Mannheim	DEL	38	1	14	15	12	10	0	4	4	4
2018–19	EHC Liwest Black Wings Linz	AUT	17	1	6	7	4	4	1	0	1	10
AHL totals			294	36	98	134	197	30	3	14	17	12
NHL totals			3	0	0	0	4	—	—	—	—	—
KHL totals			116	8	33	41	118	—	—	—	—	—

=== International ===
Year	Team	Event	Result	GP	G	A	Pts	PIM
2004	Canada Quebec	U17	3rd place, bronze medalist(s)	6	0	2	2	2
Junior totals				6	0	2	2	2
