= List of Winnipeg Jets award winners =

Winnipeg Jets awards

Team trophies
- Award*: Wins
- Presidents' Trophy: 1

Individual awards
- Award*: Wins
- Calder Memorial Trophy: 3
- Hart Memorial Trophy: 1
- Jack Adams Award: 2
- King Clancy Memorial Trophy: 1
- Lady Byng Memorial Trophy: 1
- Maurice "Rocket" Richard Trophy: 1
- Vezina Trophy: 3
- William M. Jennings Trophy: 2

Total
- Awards won: 15

This is a list of Winnipeg Jets award winners. It also includes players and data from the original Winnipeg Jets from 1972 to 1996, and the Atlanta Thrashers.

== League awards ==
=== Team trophies ===
Team trophies awarded to the Winnipeg Jets
Award	Description	Times won	Seasons	References
Presidents' Trophy	Most regular season points	1	2024–25	
Avco World Trophy (WHA)	WHA championship	3	1975–76, 1977–78, 1978–79	

=== Individual awards ===
Individual awards won by Winnipeg Jets franchise players and staff
Award	Description	Winner	Season	References
Calder Memorial Trophy	Rookie of the year	Dale Hawerchuk	1981–82	
Calder Memorial Trophy	Rookie of the year	Teemu Selanne	1992–93	
Calder Memorial Trophy	Rookie of the year	Dany Heatley	2001–02	
Dennis A. Murphy Trophy (WHA)	Top defenseman	Lars-Erik Sjoberg	1977–78	
Gordie Howe Trophy (WHA)	Most valuable player	Bobby Hull	1972–73	
Gordie Howe Trophy (WHA)	Most valuable player	Bobby Hull	1974–75	
Hart Memorial Trophy	Most valuable player to his team during the regular season	Connor Hellebuyck	2024–25	
Howard Baldwin Trophy (WHA)	Coach of the year	Bobby Kromm	1975–76	
Jack Adams Award	Top coach during the regular season	Tom Watt	1981–82	
Jack Adams Award	Top coach during the regular season	Bob Murdoch	1989–90	
King Clancy Memorial Trophy	Leadership qualities on and off the ice and humanitarian contributions within their community	Kris King	1995–96	
Lady Byng Memorial Trophy	Gentlemanly conduct	Kyle Connor	2021–22	
Lou Kaplan Trophy (WHA)	Rookie of the year	Anders Hedberg	1974–75	
Lou Kaplan Trophy (WHA)	Rookie of the year	Kent Nilsson	1977–78	
Maurice "Rocket" Richard Trophy	Most goals in the regular season	Ilya Kovalchuk	2003–04 (Note: Shared with Rick Nash of the Columbus Blue Jackets, and Jarome Iginla of the Calgary Flames.)	
Paul Deneau Trophy (WHA)	Most gentlemanly player	Kent Nilsson	1978–79	
Vezina Trophy	Top goaltender	Connor Hellebuyck	2019–20	
Vezina Trophy	Top goaltender	Connor Hellebuyck	2023–24	
Vezina Trophy	Top goaltender	Connor Hellebuyck	2024–25	
William M. Jennings Trophy	Fewest goals given up in the regular season (1981–present)	Connor Hellebuyck	2023–24	
William M. Jennings Trophy	Fewest goals given up in the regular season (1981–present)	Connor Hellebuyck	2024–25	
WHA Playoff MVP (WHA)	Most valuable player of the playoffs	Ulf Nilsson	1975–76	
WHA Playoff MVP (WHA)	Most valuable player of the playoffs	Robert Guindon	1977–78	
WHA Playoff MVP (WHA)	Most valuable player of the playoffs	Rich Preston	1978–79	

== All-Stars ==
=== WHA First, Second and Third Team All-Stars ===
Winnipeg Jets selected to the WHA First, Second and Third Team All-Stars
Player	Position	Selections	Season	Team
Norm Beaudin	Right wing	1	1972–73	3rd
Christian Bordeleau	Centre	1	1972–73	3rd
Joe Daley	Goaltender	2	1975–76	1st
Joe Daley	Goaltender	2	1976–77	2nd
Anders Hedberg	Right wing	4	1974–75	2nd
Anders Hedberg	Right wing	4	1975–76	1st
Anders Hedberg	Right wing	4	1976–77	1st
Anders Hedberg	Right wing	4	1977–78	1st
Larry Hornung	Defence	1	1972–73	2nd
Bobby Hull	Left wing	5	1972–73	1st
Bobby Hull	Left wing	5	1973–74	1st
Bobby Hull	Left wing	5	1974–75	1st
Bobby Hull	Left wing	5	1975–76	2nd
Bobby Hull	Left wing	5	1977–78	2nd
Barry Long	Defence	1	1977–78	2nd
Morris Lukowich	Left wing	1	1978–79	2nd
Ulf Nilsson	Centre	3	1975–76	1st
Ulf Nilsson	Centre	3	1976–77	2nd
Ulf Nilsson	Centre	3	1977–78	1st
Lars-Erik Sjoberg	Defence	1	1977–78	1st

=== NHL first and second team All-Stars ===
The NHL first and second team All-Stars are the top players at each position as voted on by the Professional Hockey Writers' Association.

Winnipeg Jets franchise players selected to the NHL First and Second Team All-Stars
Player	Position	Selections	Season	Team
Kyle Connor	Left wing	1	2024–25	1st
Dale Hawerchuk	Centre	1	1984–85	2nd
Connor Hellebuyck	Goaltender	4	2017–18	2nd
Connor Hellebuyck	Goaltender	4	2019–20	1st
Connor Hellebuyck	Goaltender	4	2023–24	1st
Connor Hellebuyck	Goaltender	4	2024–25	1st
Phil Housley	Defence	1	1991–92	2nd
Ilya Kovalchuk	Left wing	1	2003–04	2nd
Teemu Selanne	Right wing	1	1992–93	1st
Keith Tkachuk	Left wing	1	1994–95	2nd
Blake Wheeler	Right wing	1	2017–18	2nd
Alexei Zhamnov	Centre	1	1994–95	2nd

=== NHL All-Rookie Team ===
The NHL All-Rookie Team consists of the top rookies at each position as voted on by the Professional Hockey Writers' Association.

Winnipeg Jets franchise players selected to the NHL All-Rookie Team
Player	Position	Season
Niclas Bergfors	Forward	2009–10
Iain Duncan	Forward	1987–88
Tobias Enstrom	Defence	2007–08
Bob Essensa	Goaltender	1989–90
Dany Heatley	Forward	2001–02
Ilya Kovalchuk	Forward	2001–02
Patrik Laine	Forward	2016–17
Boris Mironov	Defense	1993–94
Teemu Selanne	Forward	1992–93

=== All-Star Game selections ===
==== WHA All-Star Game selections ====
The World Hockey Association all-star game was a mid-season exhibition game, pitting one team of WHA stars against another, held from 1973 to 1978. In 1979, a team of WHA stars played a three-game mid-season series against Dynamo Moscow in lieu of an all-star game.

Winnipeg Jets players and coaches selected to the WHA All-Star Game
Game	Year	Name	Position	References
1972–73 Western Disivison vs. Eastern Division	1973	Norm Beaudin	Right wing	
1972–73 Western Disivison vs. Eastern Division	1973	Chris Bordeleau	Center	
1972–73 Western Disivison vs. Eastern Division	1973	Larry Hornung	Defense	
1972–73 Western Disivison vs. Eastern Division	1973	Bobby Hull	Left wing & Head coach	
1972–73 Western Disivison vs. Eastern Division	1973	Nick Mickoski	Assistant coach	
1972–73 Western Disivison vs. Eastern Division	1973	Ernie Wakely	Goaltender	
1973–74 Western Disivison vs. Eastern Division	1974	Larry Hornung (Did not play)	Defense	
1973–74 Western Disivison vs. Eastern Division	1974	Fran Huck	Center	
1973–74 Western Disivison vs. Eastern Division	1974	Bobby Hull	Left wing & Head coach	
1973–74 Western Disivison vs. Eastern Division	1974	Nick Mickoski	Assistant coach	
1973–74 Western Disivison vs. Eastern Division	1974	Ernie Wakely	Goaltender	
1974–75 Western Disivison vs. Eastern Division	1975	Joe Daley	Goaltender	
1974–75 Western Disivison vs. Eastern Division	1975	Bobby Hull	Left wing	
1974–75 Western Disivison vs. Eastern Division	1975	Ulf Nilsson	Center	
1974–75 Western Disivison vs. Eastern Division	1975	Lars-Erik Sjoberg	Defense	
1975–76 Canadian Division vs. United States Divisions	1976	Thommie Bergman	Defense	
1975–76 Canadian Division vs. United States Divisions	1976	Joe Daley (Did not play)	Goaltender	
1975–76 Canadian Division vs. United States Divisions	1976	Anders Hedberg	Right wing	
1975–76 Canadian Division vs. United States Divisions	1976	Larry Hornung	Defense	
1975–76 Canadian Division vs. United States Divisions	1976	Bobby Hull	Left wing	
1975–76 Canadian Division vs. United States Divisions	1976	Ulf Nilsson	Center	
1975–76 Canadian Division vs. United States Divisions	1976	Lars-Erik Sjoberg	Defense	
1976–77 Western Disivison vs. Eastern Division	1977	Thommie Bergman	Defense	
1976–77 Western Disivison vs. Eastern Division	1977	Joe Daley	Goaltender	
1976–77 Western Disivison vs. Eastern Division	1977	Anders Hedberg	Right wing	
1976–77 Western Disivison vs. Eastern Division	1977	Bobby Hull	Left wing	
1976–77 Western Disivison vs. Eastern Division	1977	Bobby Kromm	Head Coach	
1976–77 Western Disivison vs. Eastern Division	1977	Willy Lindström	Right wing	
1976–77 Western Disivison vs. Eastern Division	1977	Ulf Nilsson	Center	
1977–78 WHA All-Stars vs. Quebec Nordiques	1978	Anders Hedberg	Right wing	
1977–78 WHA All-Stars vs. Quebec Nordiques	1978	Bobby Hull	Left wing	
1977–78 WHA All-Stars vs. Quebec Nordiques	1978	Barry Long	Defense	
1977–78 WHA All-Stars vs. Quebec Nordiques	1978	Ulf Nilsson	Center	
1977–78 WHA All-Stars vs. Quebec Nordiques	1978	Lars-Erik Sjoberg	Defense	
1978–79 WHA All-Stars vs. Moscow Dynamo	1979	Larry Hillman	Head Coach	
1978–79 WHA All-Stars vs. Moscow Dynamo	1979	Barry Long	Defense	
1978–79 WHA All-Stars vs. Moscow Dynamo	1979	Morris Lukowich	Left wing	
1978–79 WHA All-Stars vs. Moscow Dynamo	1979	Markus Mattsson	Goaltender	
1978–79 WHA All-Stars vs. Moscow Dynamo	1979	Peter Sullivan	Center	

==== NHL All-Star Game selections ====
The National Hockey League All-Star Game is a mid-season exhibition game held annually between many of the top players of each season. Fifteen All-Star Games have been held since the Winnipeg Jets franchise entered the league in 1979, with at least one player chosen to represent the franchise in each year except 2002. The All-Star game has not been held in various years: 1979 and 1987 due to the 1979 Challenge Cup and Rendez-vous '87 series between the NHL and the Soviet national team, respectively, 1995, 2005, and 2013 as a result of labor stoppages, 2006, 2010, 2014 and 2026 because of the Winter Olympic Games, 2021 as a result of the COVID-19 pandemic, and 2025 when it was replaced by the 2025 4 Nations Face-Off. The franchise hosted one of the games while it was in Atlanta. The 56th took place at Philips Arena.

- † Selected by fan vote
- ↑ All-Star Game Most Valuable Player

Winnipeg Jets franchise players and coaches selected to the All-Star Game
Game	Year	Name	Position	References
32nd	1980	Morris Lukowich	Left wing	
33rd	1981	Morris Lukowich	Left wing	
34th	1982	Dale Hawerchuk	Centre	
35th	1983	Dave Babych	Defence	
36th	1984	Dave Babych	Defence	
37th	1985	Randy Carlyle	Defence	
37th	1985	Dale Hawerchuk	Centre	
37th	1985	Paul MacLean	Right wing	
38th	1986	Dale Hawerchuk	Centre	
39th	1988	Dale Hawerchuk	Centre	
40th	1989	David Ellett	Defence	
41st	1990	Doug Smail	Left wing	
41st	1990	Thomas Steen (Did not play)	Centre	
42nd	1991	Phil Housley	Defence	
43rd	1992	Phil Housley	Defence	
44th	1993	Randy Carlyle‡	Defence	
44th	1993	Phil Housley	Defence	
44th	1993	Teemu Selanne	Right wing	
45th	1994	Teemu Selanne	Right wing	
46th	1996	Teemu Selanne	Right wing	
50th	2000	Petr Buzek	Defence	
51st	2001	Donald Audette	Right wing	
52nd	2002	No Thrashers selected	—	
53rd	2003	Dany Heatley↑	Right wing	
54th	2004	Ilya Kovalchuk†	Left wing	
55th	2007	Bob Hartley	Assistant coach	
55th	2007	Marian Hossa	Right wing	
56th	2008	Marian Hossa	Right wing	
56th	2008	Ilya Kovalchuk	Left wing	
57th	2009	Ilya Kovalchuk	Left wing	
58th	2011	Dustin Byfuglien	Defence	
58th	2011	Tobias Enstrom	Defence	
59th	2012	Dustin Byfuglien (Did not play)	Defence	
60th	2015	Dustin Byfuglien	Defence	
61st	2016	Dustin Byfuglien	Defence	
62nd	2017	Patrik Laine	Left wing	
63rd	2018	Connor Hellebuyck	Goaltender	
63rd	2018	Blake Wheeler	Right wing	
64th	2019	Paul Maurice	Coach	
64th	2019	Mark Scheifele	Centre	
64th	2019	Blake Wheeler	Right wing	
65th	2020	Connor Hellebuyck	Goaltender	
65th	2020	Mark Scheifele	Centre	
66th	2022	Kyle Connor	Left wing	
67th	2023	Connor Hellebuyck	Goaltender	
67th	2023	Josh Morrissey	Defence	
68th	2024	Rick Bowness	Coach	
68th	2024	Kyle Connor (Replaced Connor Bedard)	Left wing	
68th	2024	Connor Hellebuyck	Goaltender	

=== All-Star Game replacement events ===
Winnipeg Jets players and coaches selected to All-Star Game replacement events
Event	Year	Name	Position	References
Rendez-vous '87	1987	Dale Hawerchuk	Centre	
4 Nations Face-Off	2025	Kyle Connor (United States)	Left wing	
4 Nations Face-Off	2025	Connor Hellebuyck (United States)	Defence	
4 Nations Face-Off	2025	Josh Morrissey (Canada)	Defence	

== Career achievements ==
=== Hockey Hall of Fame ===
The following is a list of Atlanta Thrashers / Winnipeg Jets franchise players and personnel who have been enshrined in the Hockey Hall of Fame.

Winnipeg Jets franchise players and personnel inducted into the Hockey Hall of Fame
Individual	Category	Year inducted	Years with franchise in category	References
Chris Chelios	Player	2013	2010	
Dale Hawerchuk	Player	2001	1981–1990	
Marian Hossa	Player	2020	2005–2008	
Phil Housley	Player	2015	1990–1993	
Bobby Hull	Player	1983	1972–1980	
Mark Recchi	Player	2017	2007–2008	
Serge Savard	Player	1986	1981–1983	
Teemu Selanne	Player	2017	1992–1996	
Keith Tkachuk	Player	2026	1992–1996, 2007	

=== Retired numbers ===
The Winnipeg Jets have not retired any of their jersey numbers. The original Jets franchise retired number 9 for Bobby Hull on February 19, 1989, and number 25 for Thomas Steen on May 6, 1995, but were kept in circulation by the current Jets due to the Arizona Coyotes owning the original Jets' records prior to 2026. Number 9, for example, was most notably worn by Evander Kane, Andrew Copp and most recently Alex Iafallo, while number 25 was most notably worn by Paul Stastny and most recently Parker Ford. Dale Hawerchuk's number 10 was previously retired by the Coyotes on April 5, 2007, but the current Jets have withheld the number from circulation since moving from Atlanta in 2011. Number 37 was not issued by the franchise between 2003 and 2016 following the death of player Dan Snyder in 2003. Goaltender Connor Hellebuyck has worn the number since 2016, with the blessing of the Snyder family. Also out of circulation is the number 99 which was retired league-wide for Wayne Gretzky on February 6, 2000. Gretzky did not play for the Jets during his 20-year NHL career and the only player in franchise history to wear the number prior to its league-wide retirement was Rick Dudley during the 1980–81 season.

=== Winnipeg Jets Hall of Fame ===
On July 15, 2016, the Jets announced the creation of the Winnipeg Jets Hall of Fame, to honour the impact and accomplishments of the team's hockey legends and celebrate the rich history of professional hockey in the city. This list thus includes former players from the original Winnipeg Jets franchise The inaugural inductees were the "HOT Line" consisting of Anders Hedberg, Bobby Hull and Ulf Nilsson, and they were inducted on October 19, 2016.

Members of the Winnipeg Jets Hall of Fame
Individual	Years with Jets	Date of induction ceremony	References
Randy Carlyle	1983–1993	February 11, 2020	
Dale Hawerchuk	1981–1990	November 14, 2017	
Anders Hedberg	1974–1978	October 19, 2016	
Bobby Hull	1972–1980	October 19, 2016	
Ab McDonald	1972–1974	February 26, 2019	
Ulf Nilsson	1974–1978	October 19, 2016	
Teppo Numminen	1988–1996	November 15, 2022	
Teemu Selanne	1992–1996	November 15, 2022	
Lars-Erik Sjoberg	1974–1980	February 26, 2019	
Thomas Steen	1981–1995	February 11, 2020	

== Team awards ==
=== Community Service Award ===
The Community Service Award is an annual award which is given to the player "for his commitment to our community through charitable involvement, school, hospital and community visits and other philanthropic endeavors."

- 1999–00 – David Harlock
- 2000–01 – Damian Rhodes
- 2001–02 – Jeff Odgers
- 2002–03 – Chris Tamer
- 2003–04 – Andy Sutton
- 2005–06 – Ilya Kovalchuk
- 2006–07 – Scott Mellanby
- 2007–08 – Niclas Havelid
- 2008–09 – Eric Boulton and Garnet Exelby
- 2009–10 – Marty Reasoner and Jim Slater
- 2010–11 – Zach Bogosian and Jim Slater
- 2011–12 – Jim Slater
- 2012–13 – Zach Bogosian
- 2013–14 – Mark Stuart
- 2014–15 – Mark Stuart
- 2015–16 – Mark Stuart
- 2016–17 – Josh Morrissey
- 2017–18 – Matt Hendricks
- 2018–19 – Bryan Little
- 2019–20 – Bryan Little
- 2020–21 – Blake Wheeler
- 2021–22 – Josh Morrissey
- 2022–23 – Blake Wheeler
- 2023–24 – Adam Lowry
- 2024–25 – Josh Morrissey
- 2025–26 – Gabriel Vilardi

=== Dan Snyder Memorial Trophy ===
The Dan Snyder Memorial Trophy is an annual award given to the player "who embodies perseverance, dedication and hard work without reward or recognition, so that his team and teammates might succeed."

- 2003–04 – Garnet Exelby
- 2005–06 – Niclas Havelid
- 2006–07 – Vyacheslav Kozlov
- 2007–08 – Eric Perrin
- 2008–09 – Colby Armstrong
- 2009–10 – Jim Slater
- 2010–11 – Bryan Little
- 2011–12 – Mark Stuart
- 2012–13 – Zach Redmond
- 2013–14 – Bryan Little
- 2014–15 – Chris Thorburn
- 2015–16 – Matt Halischuk
- 2016–17 – Bryan Little
- 2017–18 – Tobias Enstrom
- 2018–19 – Josh Morrissey
- 2019–20 – Anthony Bitetto
- 2020–21 – Neal Pionk
- 2021–22 – Brenden Dillon
- 2022–23 – Adam Lowry
- 2023–24 – Dylan DeMelo
- 2024–25 – Alex Iafallo
- 2025–26 – Morgan Barron

=== Three Stars of the game Award ===
The Three Stars of the game Award is an annual award given to the player who earns the most points from Star of the game selections throughout the regular season.

- 1999–00 – Ray Ferraro
- 2000–01 – Ray Ferraro
- 2001–02 – Dany Heatley and Milan Hnilicka
- 2002–03 – Dany Heatley
- 2003–04 – Ilya Kovalchuk
- 2005–06 – Marian Hossa
- 2006–07 – Marian Hossa
- 2007–08 – Ilya Kovalchuk
- 2008–09 – Ilya Kovalchuk
- 2009–10 – Johan Hedberg
- 2010–11 – Ondrej Pavelec
- 2011–12 – Ondrej Pavelec
- 2012–13 – Ondrej Pavelec
- 2013–14 – Blake Wheeler
- 2014–15 – Mathieu Perreault
- 2015–16 – Mark Scheifele
- 2016–17 – Patrik Laine
- 2017–18 – Connor Hellebuyck
- 2018–19 – Connor Hellebuyck
- 2019–20 – Connor Hellebuyck
- 2020–21 – Connor Hellebuyck
- 2021–22 – Kyle Connor
- 2022–23 – Connor Hellebuyck
- 2023–24 – Connor Hellebuyck
- 2024–25 – Connor Hellebuyck
- 2025–26 – Mark Scheifele

== Defunct team awards ==
=== Players' Player Award ===
The Players' Player Award was an annual award which was discontinued after the franchise moved from Atlanta to Winnipeg in 2011.

- 1999–00 – Denny Lambert
- 2000–01 – Jeff Odgers and Chris Tamer
- 2001–02 – Jeff Odgers
- 2002–03 – Jeff Odgers
- 2003–04 – Pasi Nurminen
- 2005–06 – Scott Mellanby
- 2006–07 – Johan Hedberg
- 2007–08 – Johan Hedberg
- 2008–09 – Marty Reasoner
- 2009–10 – Marty Reasoner
- 2010–11 – Chris Thorburn

=== Team MVP ===
The Team MVP award was an annual award which was discontinued after the franchise moved from Atlanta to Winnipeg in 2011.

- 2000–01 – Ray Ferraro
- 2001–02 – Dany Heatley and Ilya Kovalchuk
- 2002–03 – Dany Heatley
- 2003–04 – Ilya Kovalchuk
- 2005–06 – Marian Hossa and Ilya Kovalchuk
- 2006–07 – Marian Hossa
- 2007–08 – Ilya Kovalchuk
- 2008–09 – Ilya Kovalchuk
- 2009–10 – Nik Antropov
- 2010–11 – Andrew Ladd

== Other awards ==
Winnipeg Jets franchise players who have received non-NHL awards
Award	Description	Winner	Season	References
Kharlamov Trophy	Most valuable Russian player in NHL	Ilya Kovalchuk	2003–04	

== See also ==
- List of National Hockey League awards
