= 2009–10 Atlanta Thrashers season =

National Hockey League team season

2009–10 Atlanta Thrashers
- Division: 2nd Southeast
- Conference: 10th Eastern
- 2009–10 record: 35–34–13
- Home record: 19–16–6
- Road record: 16–18–7
- Goals for: 234
- Goals against: 256

Team information
- General manager: Don Waddell
- Coach: John Anderson
- Captain: Ilya Kovalchuk (Oct.–Feb.); Vacant (Feb.–Apr.)
- Alternate captains: Colby Armstrong; Zach Bogosian; Ron Hainsey; Vyacheslav Kozlov
- Arena: Philips Arena
- Average attendance: 13,607 (73.4%); Total: 557,897

Team leaders
- Goals: Ilya Kovalchuk (31)
- Assists: Tobias Enstrom (44)
- Points: Nik Antropov (67)
- Penalty minutes: Eric Boulton (113)
- Plus/minus: Nik Antropov (+13)
- Wins: Johan Hedberg (21)
- Goals against average: Johan Hedberg (2.62)

The 2009–10 Atlanta Thrashers season was the 27th season of play for the National Hockey League franchise that was established on June 22, 1979, and 35th season for the organization overall. The Thrashers failed to make the Stanley Cup playoffs during the season, and at the end of the regular season, the team announced that it would not retain John Anderson as head coach. The Thrashers also promoted Don Waddell to president and Rick Dudley to general manager. Assistant coaches Randy Cunneyworth, Todd Nelson and Steve Weeks were also not retained.

== Off-season ==
With the fourth-overall pick in the Entry Draft, the Thrashers chose forward Evander Kane.

The Thrashers signed free agent forward Nik Antropov, intending to team him with Ilya Kovalchuk. The Thrashers made a trade for defenceman Pavel Kubina from the Toronto Maple Leafs, giving up Garnet Exelby in a four-player deal.

== Pre-season ==
2010 Pre-season – Record: 2–3–1 (Home: 2–1–0; Road: 0–2–1)

Game	Date	Opponent	Score	OT	Decision	Record
1	September 7	@ Nashville Predators	0-5		MacIntyre	0-1-0
2	September 18	@ Tampa Bay Lightning	1-2	OT	Pavelec	0-1-1
3	September 21	Carolina Hurricanes	4-2		Hedberg	1-1-1
4	September 23	Nashville Predators	5-4		Pavelec	2-1-1
5	September 25	@ Carolina Hurricanes	3-4		MacIntyre	2-2-1
6	September 27	Tampa Bay Lightning	1-5		Pavelec	2-3-1

== Regular season ==
=== Divisional standings ===
Southeast Division
		GP	W	L	OTL	GF	GA	Pts
**1**	**p – Washington Capitals**	**82**	**54**	**15**	**13**	**318**	**233**	**121**
2	Atlanta Thrashers	82	35	34	13	234	256	83
3	Carolina Hurricanes	82	35	37	10	230	256	80
4	Tampa Bay Lightning	82	34	36	12	217	260	80
5	Florida Panthers	82	32	37	13	208	244	77

=== Conference standings ===
Eastern Conference
R		Div	GP	W	L	OTL	GF	GA	Pts
**1**	**p – Washington Capitals**	**SE**	**82**	**54**	**15**	**13**	**318**	**233**	121
**2**	**y – New Jersey Devils**	**AT**	**82**	**48**	**27**	**7**	**222**	**191**	103
**3**	**y – Buffalo Sabres**	**NE**	**82**	**45**	**27**	**10**	**235**	**207**	100
**4**	**Pittsburgh Penguins**	**AT**	**82**	**47**	**28**	**7**	**257**	**237**	101
**5**	**Ottawa Senators**	**NE**	**82**	**44**	**32**	**6**	**225**	**238**	94
**6**	**Boston Bruins**	**NE**	**82**	**39**	**30**	**13**	**206**	**200**	91
**7**	**Philadelphia Flyers**	**AT**	**82**	**41**	**35**	**6**	**236**	**225**	88
**8**	**Montreal Canadiens**	**NE**	**82**	**39**	**33**	**10**	**217**	**223**	88
8.5
9	New York Rangers	AT	82	38	33	11	222	218	87
10	Atlanta Thrashers	SE	82	35	34	13	234	256	83
11	Carolina Hurricanes	SE	82	35	37	10	230	256	80
12	Tampa Bay Lightning	SE	82	34	36	12	217	260	80
13	New York Islanders	AT	82	34	37	11	222	264	79
14	Florida Panthers	SE	82	32	37	13	208	244	77
15	Toronto Maple Leafs	NE	82	30	38	14	214	267	74

bold – Qualified for playoffs; y – Won division; p – Won Presidents' Trophy (and division)

AT – Atlantic Division, NE – Northeast Division, SE – Southeast Division

=== Game log ===
- Green background indicates win (2 points).
- Red background indicates regulation loss (0 points).
- White background indicates overtime/shootout loss (1 point).

2009–10 Game Log
October: 5–4–1 (Home: 1–3-0; Road: 4–1–1)

#	Date	Visitor	Score	Home	OT	Decision	Attendance	Record	Pts
1	October 3	Tampa Bay Lightning	3-6	Atlanta Thrashers		Pavelec	18,545	1-0-0	2
2	October 8	Atlanta Thrashers	4-2	St. Louis Blues		Pavelec	19,150	2-0-0	4
3	October 10	Atlanta Thrashers	2-4	Ottawa Senators		Pavelec	19,360	2-1-0	4
4	October 16	Atlanta Thrashers	4-2	New Jersey Devils		Pavelec	14,187	3-1-0	6
5	October 17	Atlanta Thrashers	4-2	Buffalo Sabres		Hedberg	18,690	4-1-0	8
6	October 20	Atlanta Thrashers	1-2	Montreal Canadiens	SO	Pavelec	21,273	4-1-1	9
7	October 22	Washington Capitals	5-4	Atlanta Thrashers		Pavelec	13,192	4-2-1	9
8	October 24	San Jose Sharks	4-3	Atlanta Thrashers		Hedberg	14,945	4-3-1	9
9	October 29	Washington Capitals	4-3	Atlanta Thrashers		Pavelec	12,893	4-4-1	9
10	October 31	Atlanta Thrashers	3–1	Ottawa Senators		Pavelec	17,297	5-4-1	11

November: 9–3–2 (Home: 5–2–2; Road: 4–1–0)

#	Date	Visitor	Score	Home	OT	Decision	Attendance	Record	Pts
11	November 3	Atlanta Thrashers	5-4	Montreal Canadiens		Pavelec	21,273	6-4-1	13
12	November 5	Columbus Blue Jackets	4-3	Atlanta Thrashers		Pavelec	10,878	6-5-1	13
13	November 7	Atlanta Thrashers	3-6	New York Islanders		Pavelec	14,119	6-6-1	13
14	November 8	St. Louis Blues	2-3	Atlanta Thrashers	SO	Hedberg	10,904	7-6-1	15
15	November 12	Atlanta Thrashers	5-3	New York Rangers		Hedberg	18,200	8-6-1	17
16	November 13	Los Angeles Kings	0-7	Atlanta Thrashers		Pavelec	15,638	9-6-1	19
17	November 15	Edmonton Oilers	2-3	Atlanta Thrashers		Hedberg	11,091	10-6-1	21
18	November 19	Boston Bruins	4-3	Atlanta Thrashers	SO	Pavelec	12,112	10-6-2	22
19	November 21	Pittsburgh Penguins	3-2	Atlanta Thrashers		Hedberg	17,588	10-7-2	22
20	November 22	Tampa Bay Lightning	4-3	Atlanta Thrashers	OT	Pavelec	13,342	10-7-3	23
21	November 25	Atlanta Thrashers	2-0	Detroit Red Wings		Pavelec	19,751	11-7-3	25
22	November 27	Atlanta Thrashers	6-4	Carolina Hurricanes		Pavelec	14,463	12-7-3	27
23	November 28	Philadelphia Flyers	0-1	Atlanta Thrashers		Hedberg	16,018	13-7-3	29
24	November 30	Florida Panthers	3-4	Atlanta Thrashers		Hedberg	10,310	14-7-3	31

December: 4–10–1 (Home: 2–2–1; Road: 2–8–0)

#	Date	Visitor	Score	Home	OT	Decision	Attendance	Record	Pts
25	December 3	New York Islanders	4-1	Atlanta Thrashers		Pavelec	11,704	14-8-3	31
26	December 5	Atlanta Thrashers	2-1	Florida Panthers	SO	Hedberg	13,291	15-8-3	33
27	December 7	Atlanta Thrashers	2-5	Toronto Maple Leafs		Pavelec	19,050	15-9-3	33
28	December 9	Atlanta Thrashers	1-3	Calgary Flames		Hedberg	19,289	15-10-3	33
29	December 10	Atlanta Thrashers	2-4	Vancouver Canucks		Pavelec	18,810	15-11-3	33
30	December 12	Montreal Canadiens	3-4	Atlanta Thrashers	OT	Hedberg	16,616	16-11-3	35
31	December 14	Atlanta Thrashers	3-2	New York Rangers	SO	Hedberg	18,200	17-11-3	37
32	December 16	Atlanta Thrashers	3-4	Florida Panthers		Hedberg	11,672	17-12-3	37
33	December 17	Dallas Stars	5-6	Atlanta Thrashers	OT	Pavelec	11,957	18-12-3	39
34	December 19	New Jersey Devils	5-4	Atlanta Thrashers		Pavelec	14,616	18-13-3	39
35	December 21	Montreal Canadiens	4-3	Atlanta Thrashers	OT	Hedberg	15,075	18-13-4	40
36	December 23	Atlanta Thrashers	4-6	Boston Bruins		Hedberg	17,565	18-14-4	40
37	December 26	Atlanta Thrashers	3-4	Tampa Bay Lightning		Pavelec	15,437	18-15-4	40
38	December 28	Atlanta Thrashers	2-3	New Jersey Devils		Hedberg	17,024	18-16-4	40
39	December 30	Atlanta Thrashers	0-4	Boston Bruins		Pavelec	17,565	18-17-4	40

January: 6–5–4 (Home: 4–2–1; Road: 2–3–3)

#	Date	Visitor	Score	Home	OT	Decision	Attendance	Record	Pts
40	January 1	Atlanta Thrashers	3-4	Buffalo Sabres	OT	Hedberg	18,690	18-17-5	41
41	January 2	Atlanta Thrashers	5-6	New York Islanders	SO	Hedberg	12,824	18-17-6	42
42	January 5	Atlanta Thrashers	2-5	Pittsburgh Penguins		Pavelec	17,049	18-18-6	42
43	January 7	New York Rangers	1-2	Atlanta Thrashers		Hedberg	9,179	19-18-6	44
44	January 9	Washington Capitals	8-1	Atlanta Thrashers		Hedberg	16,767	19-19-6	44
45	January 12	Ottawa Senators	1-6	Atlanta Thrashers		Pavelec	10,017	20-19-6	46
46	January 14	Buffalo Sabres	2-1	Atlanta Thrashers	OT	Pavelec	11,313	20-19-7	47
47	January 16	Atlanta Thrashers	5-3	Carolina Hurricanes		Pavelec	14,812	21-19-7	49
48	January 18	Atlanta Thrashers	0-1	Florida Panthers		Hedberg	11,818	21-20-7	49
49	January 19	Toronto Maple Leafs	3-4	Atlanta Thrashers		Pavelec	10,208	22-20-7	51
50	January 21	Carolina Hurricanes	5-2	Atlanta Thrashers		Pavelec	10,472	22-21-7	51
51	January 23	Atlanta Thrashers	2-1	Tampa Bay Lightning	SO	Hedberg	16,212	22-21-8	52
52	January 26	Anaheim Ducks	1-2	Atlanta Thrashers		Hedberg	12,984	23-21-8	54
53	January 28	Atlanta Thrashers	4-3	Philadelphia Flyers		Hedberg	19,611	24-21-8	56
54	January 30	Atlanta Thrashers	3-4	Nashville Predators		Hedberg	16,646	24-22-8	56

February: 2–2–2 (Home: 1–1–0; Road: 1–1–2)

#	Date	Visitor	Score	Home	OT	Decision	Attendance	Record	Pts
55	February 2	Tampa Bay Lightning	2-1	Atlanta Thrashers		Pavelec	11,390	24-23-8	56
56	February 5	Atlanta Thrashers	2-5	Washington Capitals		Pavelec	18,277	24-24-8	56
57	February 6	Florida Panthers	2-4	Atlanta Thrashers		Hedberg	16,743	25-24-8	58
58	February 10	Atlanta Thrashers	3-4	Colorado Avalanche	OT	Hedberg	11,644	25-24-9	59
59	February 12	Atlanta Thrashers	3-2	Minnesota Wild		Hedberg	18,257	26-24-9	61
60	February 13	Atlanta Thrashers	4-5	Chicago Blackhawks	SO	Pavelec	22,275	26-24-10	62

March: 8–7–2 (Home: 5–5–2; Road: 3–2–0)

#	Date	Visitor	Score	Home	OT	Decision	Attendance	Record	Pts
61	March 2	Florida Panthers	2-4	Atlanta Thrashers		Hedberg	13,818	27-24-10	64
62	March 4	New York Islanders	3-6	Atlanta Thrashers		Hedberg	14,776	28-24-10	66
63	March 6	Atlanta Thrashers	2-6	Tampa Bay Lightning		Hedberg	19,926	28-25-10	66
64	March 7	Carolina Hurricanes	4-0	Atlanta Thrashers		Pavelec	15,306	28-26-10	66
65	March 9	Nashville Predators	2-1	Atlanta Thrashers		Hedberg	11,106	28-27-10	66
66	March 11	Atlanta Thrashers	1-2	Columbus Blue Jackets		Hedberg	13,459	28-28-10	66
67	March 12	New York Rangers	5-2	Atlanta Thrashers		Hedberg	15,571	28-29-10	66
68	March 14	Phoenix Coyotes	3-2	Atlanta Thrashers	SO	Pavelec	15,914	28-29-11	67
69	March 16	Buffalo Sabres	3-4	Atlanta Thrashers		Hedberg	12,540	29-29-11	69
70	March 18	Ottawa Senators	3-6	Atlanta Thrashers		Hedberg	12,718	30-29-11	71
71	March 20	Philadelphia Flyers	2-5	Atlanta Thrashers		Hedberg	17,024	31-29-11	73
72	March 21	Atlanta Thrashers	3-1	Philadelphia Flyers		Pavelec	19,575	32-29-11	75
73	March 23	Boston Bruins	4-0	Atlanta Thrashers		Hedberg	14,042	32-30-11	75
74	March 25	Toronto Maple Leafs	2-1	Atlanta Thrashers	OT	Pavelec	14,148	32-30-12	76
75	March 27	Atlanta Thrashers	4-0	Carolina Hurricanes		Hedberg	16,108	33-30-12	78
76	March 29	Carolina Hurricanes	4-1	Atlanta Thrashers		Hedberg	13,440	33-31-12	78
77	March 30	Atlanta Thrashers	3-2	Toronto Maple Leafs		Pavelec	19,079	34-31-12	80

April: 1–3–1 (Home: 1–1–0; Road: 0–2–1)

#	Date	Visitor	Score	Home	OT	Decision	Attendance	Record	Pts
78	April 1	Atlanta Thrashers	1-2	Washington Capitals		Pavelec	18,277	34-32-12	80
79	April 3	Atlanta Thrashers	3-4	Pittsburgh Penguins	OT	Hedberg	17,047	34-32-13	81
80	April 6	New Jersey Devils	3-0	Atlanta Thrashers		Hedberg	12,038	34-33-13	81
81	April 9	Atlanta Thrashers	2-5	Washington Capitals		Pavelec	18,277	34-34-13	81
82	April 10	Pittsburgh Penguins	0-1	Atlanta Thrashers		Hedberg	18,959	35-34-13	83

== Player statistics ==
=== Skaters ===
Note: GP = Games played; G = Goals; A = Assists; Pts = Points; +/− = Plus/minus; PIM = Penalty minutes

Regular season

Player	GP	G	A	Pts	+/−	PIM
Nik Antropov	76	24	43	67	13	44
Maxim Afinogenov	82	24	37	61	-17	46
Ilya Kovalchuk^{‡}	49	31	27	58	1	45
Rich Peverley	82	22	33	55	-14	36
Tobias Enstrom	82	6	44	50	-5	30
Pavel Kubina	76	6	32	38	0	66
Bryan Little	79	13	21	34	-6	20
Colby Armstrong	79	15	14	29	6	61
Vyacheslav Kozlov	55	8	18	26	-15	33
Todd White	65	7	19	26	-11	24
Ron Hainsey	80	5	21	26	-6	39
Evander Kane	66	14	12	26	2	62
Zach Bogosian	81	10	13	23	-18	61
Jim Slater	61	11	7	18	1	60
Marty Reasoner	80	4	13	17	-3	24
Niclas Bergfors^{†}	27	8	9	17	-3	0
Chris Thorburn	76	4	9	13	6	89
Johnny Oduya^{†}	27	1	8	9	6	12
Clarke MacArthur^{†}	21	3	6	9	-2	2
Eric Boulton	62	2	6	8	-1	113
Christoph Schubert	47	2	5	7	-6	69
Evgeny Artyukhin^{†}	17	5	2	7	-4	31
Anssi Salmela^{‡}	29	1	4	5	4	22
Mark Popovic	37	2	2	4	0	10
Boris Valabik	23	0	2	2	2	36
Tim Stapleton	6	2	0	2	1	2
Arturs Kulda	4	0	2	2	2	2
Chris Chelios	7	0	0	0	-2	0

=== Goaltenders ===
Note: GP = Games played; TOI = Time on ice (minutes); W = Wins; L = Losses; OT = Overtime losses; GA = Goals against; GAA= Goals against average; SA= Shots against; SV= Saves; Sv% = Save percentage; SO= Shutouts

Regular season

Player	GP	TOI	W	L	OT	GA	GAA	SA	Sv%	SO	G	A	PIM
Johan Hedberg	47	2632	21	16	6	115	2.62	1355	.915	3	0	1	6
Ondrej Pavelec	42	2317	14	18	7	127	3.29	1353	.906	2	0	1	0

^{†}Denotes player spent time with another team before joining Thrashers. Stats reflect time with the Thrashers only.
^{‡}Traded mid-season
underline/italics denotes franchise record

== Awards and records ==
=== Records ===
Player	Record (Amount)	Achieved
Tobias Enstrom	Most assist by a defenseman in franchise history (83)	December 19, 2009
Tobias Enstrom	Most points in franchise history by a defenseman in a single season (40)	January 5, 2010
Tobias Enstrom	Most points by a defenseman in franchise history (108)	January 16, 2010
Tobias Enstrom	Most assists in franchise history by a defenseman in a single season (35)	January 26, 2010
Eric Boulton	Most penalty minutes in franchise history (536)	March 20, 2010

=== Milestones ===
Regular Season
Player	Milestone	Reached
Evander Kane	1st Career NHL Game; 1st Career NHL Assist; 1st Career NHL Point	October 3, 2009
Evander Kane	1st Career NHL Goal	October 8, 2009
Ilya Kovalchuk	300th career NHL Goal	October 8, 2009
Colby Armstrong	150th career NHL point	October 8, 2009
Chris Thorburn	200th career NHL game	October 16, 2009
Ron Hainsey	100th career NHL assist	October 29, 2009
Mark Popovic	1st career NHL Goal	November 3, 2009
Pavel Kubina	100th career NHL Goal	November 7, 2009
Ondrej Pavelec	1st career NHL shutout	November 13, 2009
Mark Popovic	1st career NHL goal	November 13, 2009
Todd White	600th Career NHL game	December 12, 2009
Eric Boulton	1,000th Career NHL PIM	December 12, 2009
Maxim Afinogenov	600th Career NHL Game	December 14, 2009
Christoph Schubert	300th Career NHL Game	December 21, 2009
Tobias Enstrom	200th Career NHL Game	December 23, 2009
Tobias Enstrom	100th career NHL point	December 28, 2009
Ilya Kovalchuk	600th career NHL point	January 1, 2010
Ondrej Pavelec	1st career NHL point	January 12, 2010
Eric Boulton	1st career NHL power play goal	January 12, 2010
Todd White	200th game as a Thrasher	January 12, 2010
Jim Slater	300th career NHL game	January 16, 2010
Nik Antropov	200th career NHL assist	January 30, 2010
Pavel Kubina	800th career NHL game	February 2, 2010
Marty Reasoner	600th career NHL game	February 5, 2010
Johan Hedberg	50th win as a Thrasher	February 12, 2010
Rich Peverley	100th career NHL point	March 2, 2010
Tobias Enstrom	100th career NHL assist	March 18, 2010

=== Awards ===
Regular Season
Player	Award	Awarded
Ilya Kovalchuk	NHL Second Star of the Week	November 16, 2009

== Transactions ==
The Thrashers have been involved in the following transactions during the 2009–10 season.

=== Trades ===
Date	Details
June 27, 2009	To Los Angeles Kings 4th-round pick (95th overall) in 2009	To Atlanta Thrashers 4th-round pick (117th overall) in 2009; 4th-round pick (120th overall) in 2009; 7th-round pick (203rd overall) in 2009
June 27, 2009	To Chicago Blackhawks 6th-round pick (177th overall) in 2009	To Atlanta Thrashers 5th-round pick in 2010
July 1, 2009	To Toronto Maple Leafs Garnet Exelby; Colin Stuart	To Atlanta Thrashers Pavel Kubina; Tim Stapleton
September 24, 2009	To Anaheim Ducks Future considerations	To Atlanta Thrashers Steve McCarthy
October 8, 2009	To Columbus Blue Jackets Jordan LaVallee-Smotherman	To Atlanta Thrashers Future considerations
February 4, 2010	To New Jersey Devils Ilya Kovalchuk; Anssi Salmela; 2nd-round pick in 2010	To Atlanta Thrashers Johnny Oduya; Niclas Bergfors; Patrice Cormier; 1st-round pick in 2010; 2nd-round pick in 2010
February 9, 2010	To Dallas Stars Kari Lehtonen	To Atlanta Thrashers Ivan Vishnevskiy; 4th-round pick in 2010
March 1, 2010	To Anaheim Ducks Nathan Oystrick; Conditional pick in 2011 (Note: Condition not satisfied.)	To Atlanta Thrashers Evgeny Artyukhin
March 1, 2010	To Buffalo Sabres 3rd-round pick in 2010; 4th-round pick in 2010	To Atlanta Thrashers Clarke MacArthur

=== Free agents acquired ===
Player	Former team	Contract terms
Nik Antropov	New York Rangers	4 years, $16 million
Joel Kwiatkowski	Severstal Cherepovets	undisclosed
Jason Krog	Manitoba Moose	undisclosed
Drew MacIntyre	Milwaukee Admirals	undisclosed
Peter Mannino	New York Islanders	undisclosed
Anthony Stewart	Florida Panthers	undisclosed
Noah Welch	Tampa Bay Lightning	undisclosed
Josh Gratton	Philadelphia Flyers	undisclosed
Michael Vernace	Colorado Avalanche	undisclosed
Mark Popovic	SKA Saint Petersburg	undisclosed
Maxim Afinogenov	Buffalo Sabres	1 year, $800,000
Chris Chelios	Detroit Red Wings	undisclosed

=== Free agents lost ===
Player	New team	Contract terms
Clay Wilson	Florida Panthers	2 years

=== Claimed via waivers ===
Player	Former team	Date claimed off waivers
Christoph Schubert	Ottawa Senators	October 2, 2009

=== Lost via waivers ===
Player	New team	Date claimed off waivers

=== Player signings ===
Player	Contract terms
Anssi Salmela	2 years, $1.225 million
Marty Reasoner	2 years, $2.3 million
Andrew Kozek	undisclosed
Rylan Kaip	undisclosed
Chris Thorburn	2 years, $1.32 million
Joey Crabb	undisclosed
Nathan Oystrick	undisclosed
Jim Slater	1 year, $800,000
Kari Lehtonen	1 year, $3 million
Colby Armstrong	2 years, $2.4 million
Scott Lehman	undisclosed
Grant Lewis	undisclosed
Tim Stapleton	undisclosed
Evander Kane	undisclosed
Boris Valabik	2 years, $1.525 million
Michael Forney	multi-year contract
Rich Peverley	2 years, $2.6 million contract extension

== Draft picks ==
Atlanta's picks at the 2009 NHL entry draft in Montreal, Quebec.

Round	Overall	Player	Position	Nationality	College/Junior/Club team (League)
1	4	Evander Kane	(C)	Canada	Vancouver Giants (WHL)
2	34	Carl Klingberg	(F)	Sweden	Frolunda HC (J20 SuperElit)
2	45 (from Anaheim via Washington and Montreal)	Jeremy Morin	(LW)	United States	U.S. National Team Development Program (USHL)
4	117 (from San Jose via Los Angeles)	Eddie Pasquale	(G)	Canada	Saginaw Spirit (OHL)
4	120 (from Detroit via Los Angeles)	Ben Chiarot	(D)	Canada	Guelph Storm (OHL)
5	125	Cody Sol	(D)	Canada	Saginaw Spirit (OHL)
6	155	Jimmy Bubnick	(C)	Canada	Kamloops Blazers (WHL)
7	185	Levko Koper	(LW)	Canada	Spokane Chiefs (WHL)
7	203 (from Vancouver via Los Angeles)	Jordan Samuels-Thomas	(LW)	United States	Waterloo Black Hawks (USHL)

== See also ==
- 2009–10 NHL season
