= Dan Snyder Memorial Award =

Annual award given to a player of the Winnipeg Jets hockey team

The Dan Snyder Memorial Award is awarded each year to the player of the Winnipeg Jets who "best embodies perseverance, dedication and hard work without reward or recognition, so that his team and teammates might succeed." The award was created in 2004, when the franchise was located in Atlanta, to commemorate Atlanta Thrashers forward Dan Snyder, who died from injuries sustained in an automobile accident in September 2003. A similar award is awarded in the OHL and is known as the Dan Snyder Memorial Trophy. Sometimes the Jets' award is called the same name.

With the Thrasher's relocation to Winnipeg, Manitoba to become the Winnipeg Jets following the 2010-11 NHL season, there was worry (by both Thrashers' fans and those living in Snyder's hometown) that Snyder would be forgotten. However, Scott Brown, Winnipeg's director of hockey operations/communications, quelled those fears, revealing that "Craig (Heisinger) was in Atlanta and saw all the things they did for Dan Snyder and we are fully prepared and will be honouring everything to do with him. Dan Snyder's friends and family should not worry at all about that." On March 28, 2012 it was announced that the Jets would continue the tradition of the award. The Snyder family was invited to participate in the first ceremony in Winnipeg on the final game of the regular season.

On April 7, 2012, Winnipeg Jets' defenceman Mark Stuart became the first Winnipeg Jet to be given the memorial award.

== Winners ==
Season	Player	Position
2003–04	Garnet Exelby	Defenceman
2004–05	Not awarded due to NHL lock-out	—
2005–06	Niclas Havelid	Defenceman
2006–07	Slava Kozlov	Left wing
2007–08	Eric Perrin	Centre
2008–09	Colby Armstrong	Right wing
2009–10	Jim Slater	Centre
2010–11	Bryan Little	Centre
2011–12	Mark Stuart	Defenceman
2012–13	Zach Redmond	Defenceman
2013–14	Bryan Little	Centre
2014–15	Chris Thorburn	Right wing
2015–16	Matt Halischuk	Right wing
2016–17	Bryan Little	Centre
2017–18	Tobias Enström	Defenceman
2018-19	Josh Morrissey	Defenceman
2019-20	Anthony Bitetto	Defenceman
2020-21	Neal Pionk	Defenceman
2021-22	Brenden Dillon	Defenceman
2022–23	Adam Lowry	Centre
2023-24	Dylan DeMelo	Defenceman
2024–25	Alex Iafallo	Left wing
2025–26	Morgan Barron	Centre
