= Pavel Kubina =

Czech ice hockey player (born 1977)

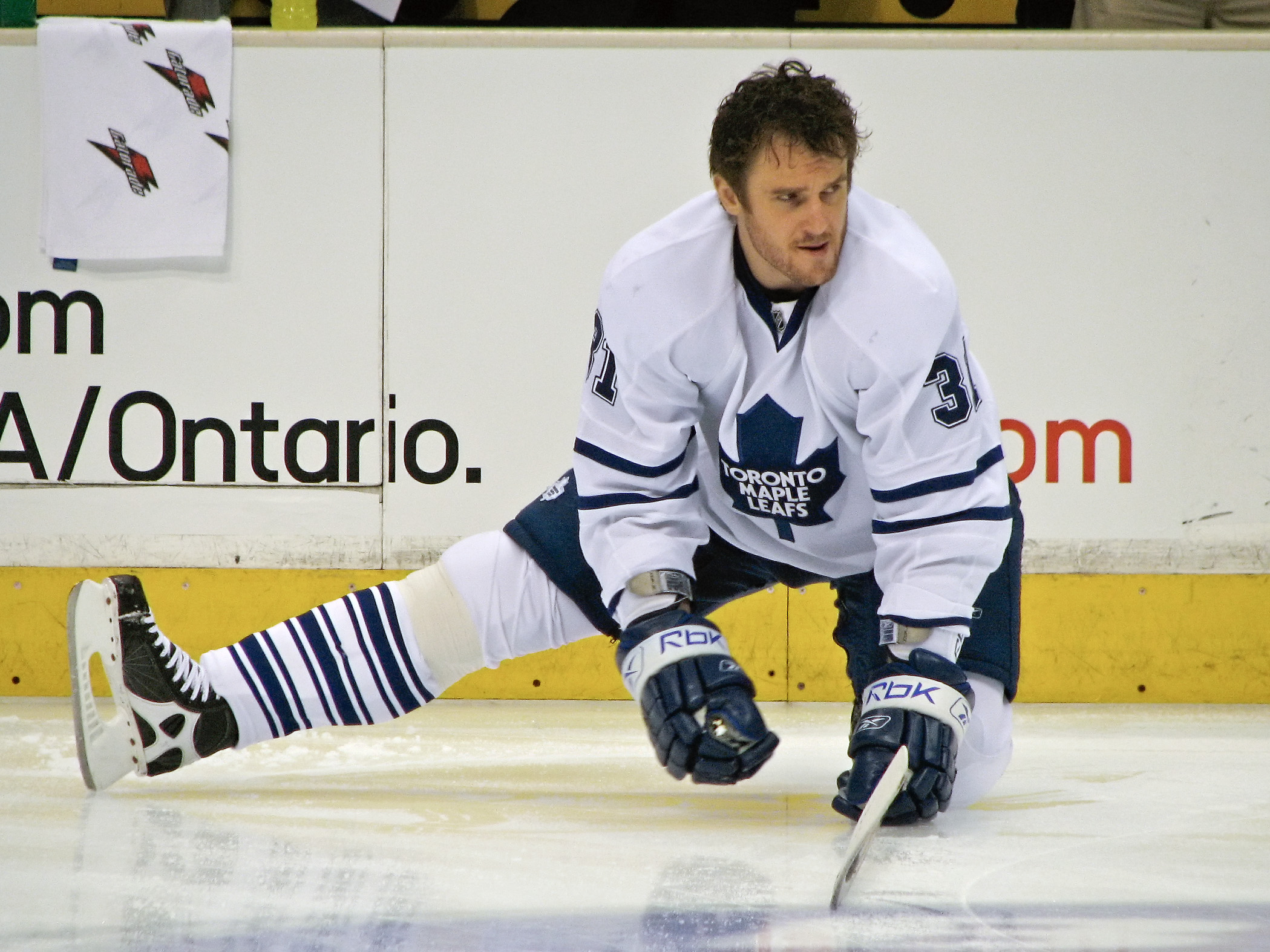
- Kubina with the Toronto Maple Leafs in 2008
- Born: April 15, 1977 (age 49) Čeladná, Czechoslovakia
- Height: 6 ft 4 in (193 cm)
- Weight: 220 lb (100 kg; 15 st 10 lb)
- Position: Defence
- Shot: Right
- Played for: Tampa Bay Lightning; Toronto Maple Leafs; Atlanta Thrashers; Philadelphia Flyers
- National team: Czech Republic
- NHL draft: 179th overall, 1996; Tampa Bay Lightning
- Playing career: 1993–2013

Pavel Kubina (born April 15, 1977) is a Czech former professional ice hockey defenceman who played in the National Hockey League (NHL) for the Tampa Bay Lightning, Toronto Maple Leafs, Atlanta Thrashers and Philadelphia Flyers from 1998 to 2012.

== Playing career ==
Kubina began his professional career with HC Vítkovice of the Czech Extraliga. He played there for four seasons, during which he was drafted in the seventh round of the 1996 NHL entry draft by the Tampa Bay Lightning.

Later in 1996, Kubina moved to Canada to join the Moose Jaw Warriors of the Western Hockey League (WHL), with which he scored 44 points in 61 games during the 1996–97 season. He made his NHL debut in the 1997–98 season, although he spent most of the year playing for the Adirondack Red Wings of the American Hockey League (AHL).

Kubina spent most of the next season in the NHL, scoring 21 points, while playing occasionally in the International Hockey League (IHL) for the Cleveland Lumberjacks. By the 1999–2000 season, Kubina had cemented his position in the Lightning's lineup, scoring 26 points during the season.

Kubina scored 30 and 34 points in the 2000–01 and 2001–02 seasons respectively. In the 2003–04 season, he was named to the NHL All-Star Game and won the Stanley Cup with Tampa Bay over the Calgary Flames in the Final.

On July 1, 2006, Kubina signed a four-year, $20 million contract with the Toronto Maple Leafs. He was suspended by the NHL for the first game of the 2006–07 season for cross-checking the Detroit Red Wings' Jiří Hudler in a pre-season game.

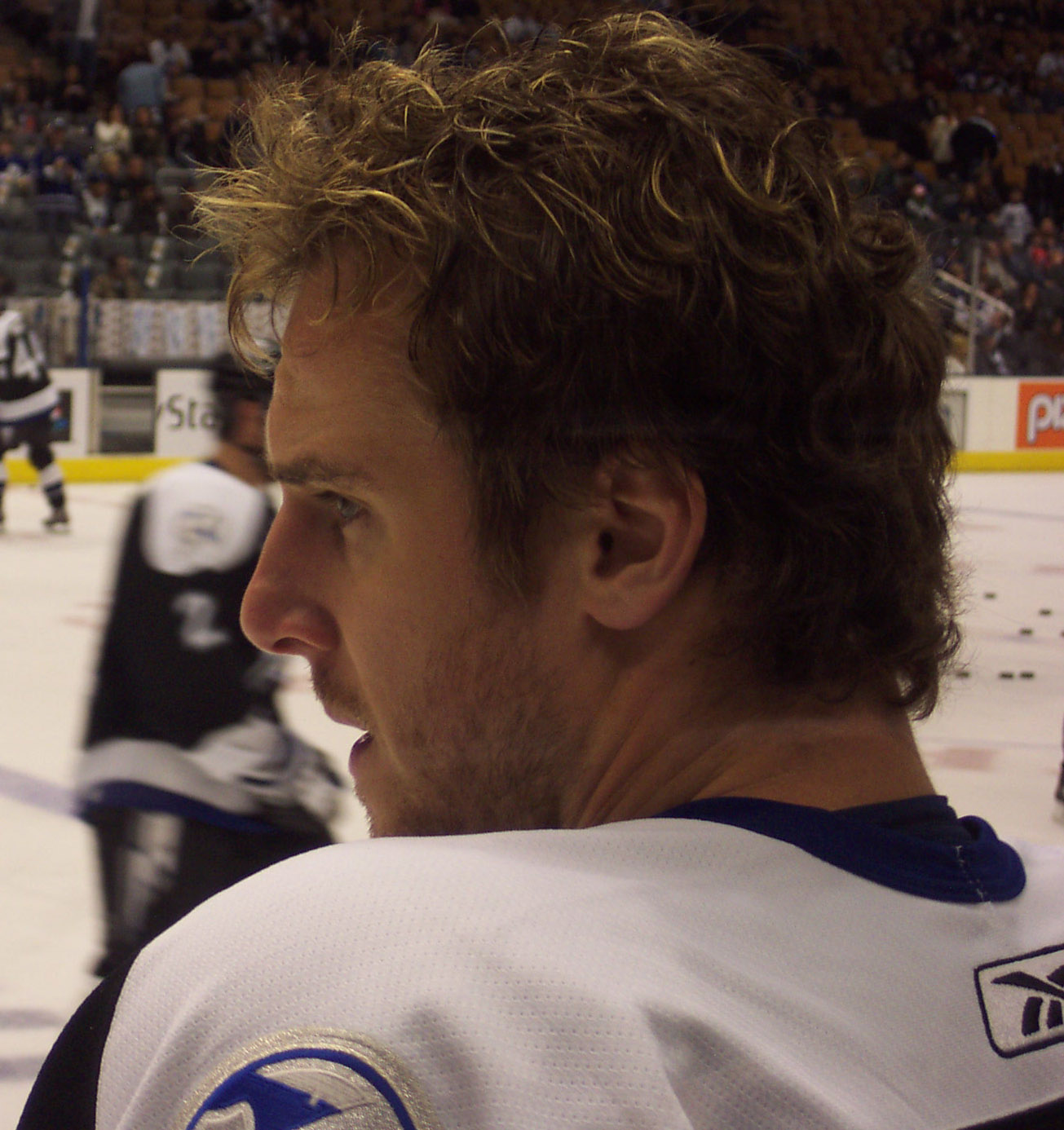
Kubina in 2007.

On July 1, 2009, Kubina was traded to the Atlanta Thrashers (along with Tim Stapleton) in exchange for Garnet Exelby and Colin Stuart.

On July 2, 2010, Kubina returned to the Tampa Bay Lightning, signing a two-year contract valued at $7.7 million worth approximately $3.85 million annually. On March 9, 2011, Kubina was suspended three games for an elbow on Chicago Blackhawks forward Dave Bolland, which resulted in a concussion for the latter.

On February 18, 2012, Kubina was traded to the Philadelphia Flyers in exchange for Jon Kalinski, a second-round pick in either the 2012 or 2013 NHL entry draft and a fourth-round pick in the 2013 NHL Entry Draft. He finished the 2011–12 season with 4 points in 17 games with the Flyers.

On September 15, 2012, Kubina left the NHL to join Genève-Servette HC of the Swiss National Liga A.

On December 20, 2013, Kubina announced his retirement from hockey.

== Personal life ==
He and his wife, Andrea, welcomed their first child, a girl, Tereza on November 9, 2006, in the Czech Republic.

== Career statistics ==
=== Regular season and playoffs ===
			Regular season					Playoffs
Season	Team	League	GP	G	A	Pts	PIM	GP	G	A	Pts	PIM
1993–94	HC Vítkovice	CZE U20	35	4	3	7	—	—	—	—	—	—
1993–94	HC Vítkovice	ZZE	1	0	0	0	0	—	—	—	—	—
1994–95	HC Vítkovice	CZE U20	20	6	10	16	—	—	—	—	—	—
1994–95	HC Vítkovice	CZE	8	2	0	2	10	—	—	—	—	—
1995–96	HC Vítkovice	CZE U20	16	5	10	15	—	—	—	—	—	—
1995–96	HC Vítkovice	CZE	33	3	3	6	32	4	0	0	0	0
1996–97	HC Vítkovice	CZE	1	0	0	0	0	—	—	—	—	—
1996–97	Moose Jaw Warriors	WHL	61	12	32	44	116	11	2	5	7	27
1997–98	Tampa Bay Lightning	NHL	10	1	2	3	22	—	—	—	—	—
1997–98	Adirondack Red Wings	AHL	55	4	8	12	86	1	1	0	1	14
1998–99	Tampa Bay Lightning	NHL	68	9	12	21	80	—	—	—	—	—
1998–99	Cleveland Lumberjacks	IHL	6	2	2	4	16	—	—	—	—	—
1999–00	Tampa Bay Lightning	NHL	69	8	18	26	93	—	—	—	—	—
2000–01	Tampa Bay Lightning	NHL	70	11	19	30	103	—	—	—	—	—
2001–02	Tampa Bay Lightning	NHL	82	11	23	34	106	—	—	—	—	—
2002–03	Tampa Bay Lightning	NHL	75	3	19	22	78	11	0	0	0	12
2003–04	Tampa Bay Lightning	NHL	81	17	18	35	85	22	0	4	4	50
2004–05	HC Vítkovice	CZE	28	5	5	10	46	12	4	6	10	34
2005–06	Tampa Bay Lightning	NHL	76	5	33	38	96	5	1	1	2	26
2006–07	Toronto Maple Leafs	NHL	61	7	14	21	48	—	—	—	—	—
2007–08	Toronto Maple Leafs	NHL	72	11	29	40	116	—	—	—	—	—
2008–09	Toronto Maple Leafs	NHL	82	14	26	40	94	—	—	—	—	—
2009–10	Atlanta Thrashers	NHL	76	6	32	38	66	—	—	—	—	—
2010–11	Tampa Bay Lightning	NHL	79	4	19	23	62	8	2	1	3	10
2011–12	Tampa Bay Lightning	NHL	52	3	8	11	59	—	—	—	—	—
2011–12	Philadelphia Flyers	NHL	17	0	4	4	15	5	0	1	1	12
2012–13	Genève–Servette HC	NLA	3	0	1	1	4	1	0	0	0	0
NHL totals			970	110	276	386	1,123	51	3	7	10	110

=== International ===
Medal record

Representing Czech Republic
Bronze medal – third place	2006 Torino	

World Championships
Gold medal – first place	1999 Oslo	
Gold medal – first place	2001 Nuremberg	
Gold medal – first place	2005 Vienna	

Year	Team	Event	GP	G	A	Pts	PIM
1996	Czech Republic	WJC	6	0	2	2	8
1999	Czech Republic	WC	10	2	6	8	12
2001	Czech Republic	WC	9	2	3	5	18
2002	Czech Republic	OLY	4	0	1	1	0
2002	Czech Republic	WC	7	3	4	7	8
2005	Czech Republic	WC	9	2	2	4	10
2006	Czech Republic	OLY	8	1	1	2	12
2010	Czech Republic	OLY	5	0	0	0	2
Senior totals			52	10	17	27	62
