= Niclas Hävelid =

Swedish ice hockey player (born 1973)

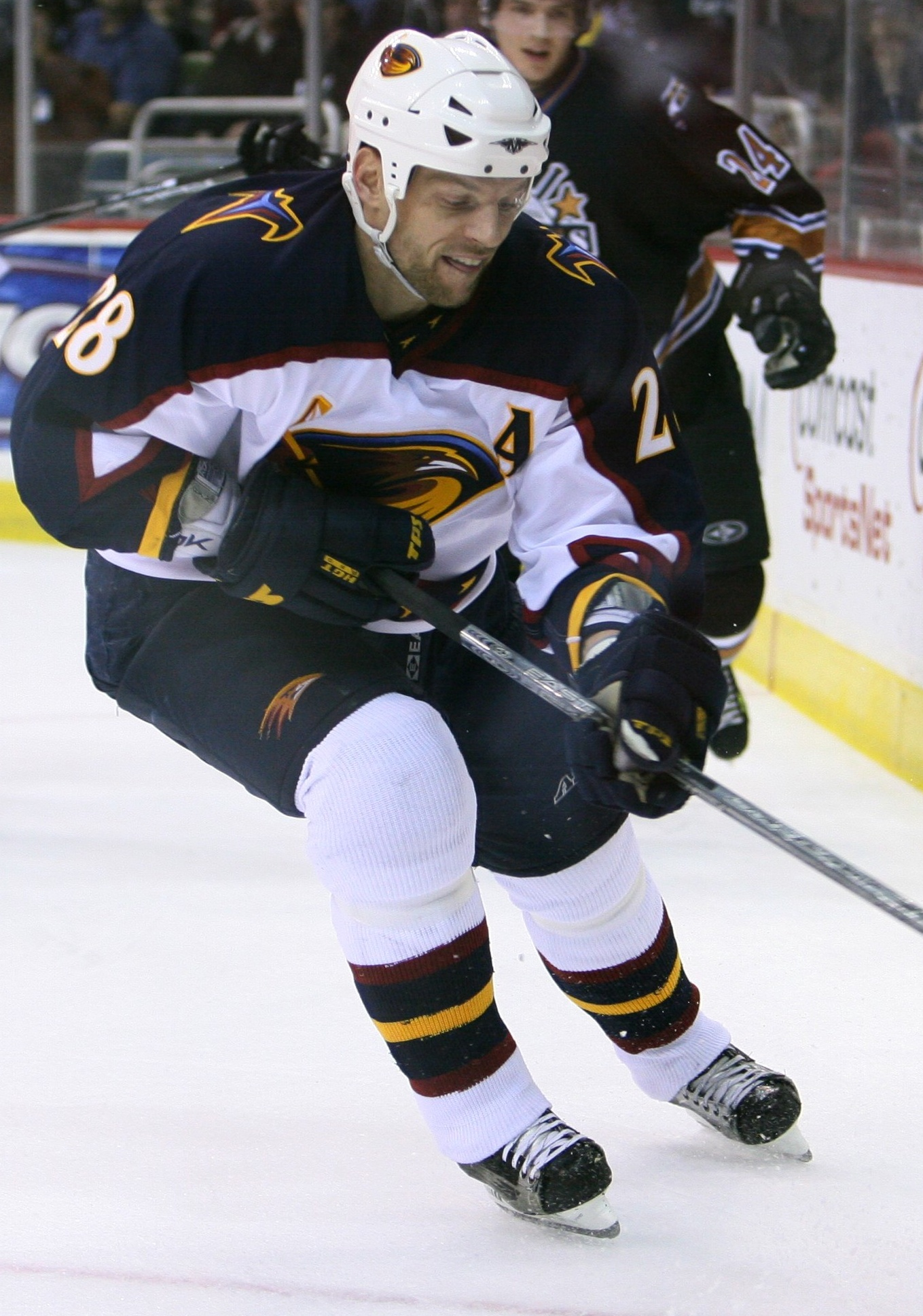
- Hävelid playing for the Atlanta Thrashers in 2005-06.
- Born: April 12, 1973 (age 53) Stockholm, Sweden
- Height: 6 ft 0 in (183 cm)
- Weight: 200 lb (91 kg; 14 st 4 lb)
- Position: Defence
- Shot: Left
- Played for: Mighty Ducks of Anaheim; Atlanta Thrashers; New Jersey Devils; Linköpings HC
- National team: Sweden
- NHL draft: 83rd overall, 1999; Mighty Ducks of Anaheim
- Playing career: 1991–2013

Niclas Anders Hävelid (born April 12, 1973) is a Swedish former professional ice hockey defenceman who last played for Linköpings HC of the Swedish Elitserien during the 2012–13 season. He won a gold medal with Team Sweden at the 2006 Winter Olympics.

== Playing career ==
While born in Stockholm, he was raised in Enköping, roughly 78 km west of his birthplace. Hävelid began his hockey career playing locally around his home of Enköping in Division 1 of the SIHA. After two seasons with the Enköping he played with the Arlanda Wings for the 1990–1991 season. The following year, he moved to AIK, a team based in Stockholm. He continued with AIK until the 1998–99 season when he went to the Malmö Redhawks.

=== NHL ===
==== Mighty Ducks of Anaheim (1999-2004) ====
Hävelid was drafted 83rd overall by the Mighty Ducks of Anaheim in the 1999 NHL entry draft at age 28 (most players are drafted at age 18). In 1999, he played in his first North American season, notching nine points (two goals, seven assists) in 50 games with Anaheim, making his NHL debut at Dallas on October 2, 1999. A month later, he recorded his first goal, assist and multiple-point game in the NHL in one night against the Blackhawks and goaltender Jocelyn Thibault on November 19. In December, he would continue to post four (one goal, three assists) out of nine points for the season in a nine-game span from December 12 to 29, 1999. The new year would not begin as well. With a broken finger, Hävelid would miss 22 games, from January 15 to March 8, 2000. His lone two game minor league stint for post injury conditioning would be with the Cincinnati Mighty Ducks. He was scoreless in both games.

In the early months of the 2000–01 season with the Ducks, Hävelid earned six of his ten assists for the year in a nine-game span from October 16 to 30, 2000. This would include a career-best four game point streak. He would set yet another career high with two goals and four points against Columbus on December 13, 2000.

January 2001 would bring yet another injury, a tear in the anterior cruciate ligament, or ACL, and a partial tear in the medial collateral ligament, suffered during a game against the Pittsburgh Penguins on January 15, 2001. He would miss 35 games from the injury, however still retain his ranking as third on the club in Average Time on ice of 21:51.

While the 2001–02 season would only generate one goal and two assists, the 2002–03 season would prove to be one to remember. Among five Mighty Ducks to play in all 82 regular-season games, he would set career highs with 11 goals, 22 assists and 33 points with Anaheim. By the end of the regular season, he ranked third on club with career-best plus-five rating and ATOI of 22:29, higher than the 2001–02 season. He was second among Mighty Ducks blue liners in points, goals and assists, and shared the team lead and was third among NHL defencemen with a career-best five game-winning tallies.

Hävelid began by collecting nine out of his 33 points (five goals, four assists) in a 14–game span from November 27 to December 28, 2002, including a career-high two-game goal streak finalized with a career-best two goals against Phoenix on December 22, 2002. The new year of 2003 was injury free, and brought a plus or even rating in 11 straight games from January 18 to February 12, and was plus-eight in that span. Within that time, he earned five assists in a five-game stretch from January 22 to February 4, including a three-game assist/point streak, during which Hävelid played his 200th NHL game at San Jose on January 30, 2003. Two months later, he registered four points in a three-game span from March 19 to 22 (one goal, three assists).

The Mighty Ducks began the Stanley Cup Playoffs with a sweep of the Detroit Red Wings in the first round. Moving to the Semifinals, Hävelid contributed in a hard-fought series against the Dallas Stars on April 23, 2003, resulting in the fourth longest overtime game in NHL history (Game 1). The match lasted into five overtime periods with an overtime length of 80:43, with goals from fellow Ducks and future Thrashers teammates Jason Krog and Steve Rucchin, yet ended only when Petr Sýkora scored the game-winning goal for Anaheim to a final score of 4–3. The series would end in six games (4–2).

With a closely contested sweep of the Minnesota Wild, he led the Mighty Ducks to their first NHL Western Conference Championship and the Clarence S. Campbell Bowl. May 27, 2003, would bring Hävelid and the Mighty Ducks to the Stanley Cup Finals against the New Jersey Devils, where he notched a final Playoffs result of four assists in 21 games, sharing second among the defencemen on his team. But the series would end in a loss for Anaheim as the Devils won Game 7, 3–0, the third shutout of the series.

The following season would show even better rankings for Hävelid, as he earned 26 points in 79 games with the Ducks (six goals, 20 assists). He would lead the Mighty Ducks defencemen and rank eighth on the team in points, share first among Mighty Ducks defencemen in goals, and top the club's blue liners with career-best five power play goals and three game-winning tallies.

He would also finish second on the club ranking with 22:38 ATOI, just nine seconds per game over the previous season. On December 21, 2003, he took a career-high seven shots against the San Jose Sharks and registered a career-best four assists tying his career high with four points against Minnesota on January 23, 2004, in a regular season rematch. He played his 300th NHL game at Phoenix on March 16.

In the summer of 2004, he was traded to the Thrashers for defenceman Kurtis Foster. Due to the NHL lockout, Hävelid signed as a free agent with Södertälje, posting four points (two goals, two assists) over 46 games. This effort helped Södertälje reach the league semifinals, where he notched two points in 10 post-season games.

==== Post lockout (2005-2009) ====
With the resolution of the NHL lockout, he re-joined the Atlanta Thrashers for the 2005–06 NHL season. He began by leading all NHL players with plus-eight rating for the week of November 7–13, 2005. By the end of the season, the total would show him with a plus-14 rating over his final 18 games, after going minus-six through the first 64 games, even with the previous recognition.

Hävelid blocked at least one shot in 76 out of 82 games, leading the team or sharing first in blocked shots on 34 occasions, ending the season as second on the team with 190 blocked shots. He led the team with 2,510 shifts, averaging 30.6 shifts per game and ranking 11th in the league.

He led the team in ice time on 37 occasions, and defencemen 45 times, skating in career-best 24:25 average time on ice per game to lead Thrashers and share 19th in NHL, an increase of 1:47 over his previous NHL season with Anaheim. Sharing the team lead with 82 games played to equal his single-season record, the Thrashers finished with 41–33–8 record with him in the lineup, and 17–5–2 when he recorded a point, as he notched his 100th career point, a goal, against Philadelphia on December 28, 2005.

He was also third among team's defencemen in goals, and recorded five multiple-point games to place second among Thrashers defencemen, earning 14 points (one goal, 13 assists) over final 28 games after notching 18 points (three goals, 15 assists) over first 54 games. This led to his being counted third among Thrashers defencemen and 10th overall with 32 points (four goals, 28 assists). In recognition of his efforts during the 2005–06 season, he was awarded the Dan Snyder Memorial Award, cited as the team's Unsung Hero for the year. That summer he signed a three-year contract extension with the Thrashers.

In the 2006–07 season, Hävelid played in 77 games, registering 21 points (three goals, 18 assists) and ranking third among Thrashers defencemen. The team posted a 13–4–1 record when he registered points, and went 38–27–11 with him in the lineup. He recorded 225 blocked shots to top the team and rank third in the NHL, improving from the previous season by 35 blocked shots. Hävelid continued to record a plus or even rating in 46 out of 77 games, with a plus-seven from October 7 to 11, and a plus-four from November 30 to December 5, 2006. He collected a plus-rating 29 times, including season-best plus-four rating against Florida on October 7, 2006. He would continue with a plus rating in five consecutive games from March 6 to 15, posting a plus-six rating in that span.

He registered his 100th career NHL assist against Phoenix on January 6, 2007, and recorded two out of his three goals over a four-game span from January 20 to 30, 2007. Hävelid collected six assists over 10 games from February 26 to March 18, and posted at least one point in 19 games, including a pair of two-assist games at New Jersey on December 23, 2006, and against Philadelphia on March 15, 2007.

The time Hävelid spent on the ice would increase as well. He reached 20 minutes or more of ice time on 72 occasions, topping 30 minutes of ice time six times, including a career-best 33:59 at Philadelphia on October 26. Skating in at least 30 shifts on 32 occasions, including a career-high 40 shifts at Buffalo on October 28, Hävelid ranked 15th in the NHL with an ATOI of 25:16, a career best.

For the first time in Thrashers franchise history, they made the 2007 Stanley Cup Playoffs. While being swept in the Quarterfinals by the New York Rangers, Hävelid still led the team's defencemen and was tied for third on his squad with two points (two assists) in four post-season contests, sharing the team lead. He also ranked second on the Thrashers in the postseason with an average of 24:14 of ice time in four contests.

By the beginning of the 2007–08 season, Hävelid has earned 138 points (31 goals, 107 assists) in 469 NHL games with Anaheim and Atlanta, missing just eight games over the past four NHL seasons. In Atlanta, he has averaged 24:49 of ice time per game over 159 contests with the Thrashers to rank first on the team's all-time list. On March 2, 2009, Hävelid was traded to the New Jersey Devils with Myles Stoesz for Anssi Salmela.

==== Career finale ====
On May 14, 2009, he signed a 1+1 year contract with Linköpings HC.

In April 2013, Hävelid officially announced his retirement.

== Awards ==
- 2006 – Dan Snyder Memorial Award

== Career statistics ==
=== Regular season and playoffs ===
| | | | Regular season | | | | | Playoffs |
| Season | Team | League | GP | G | A | Pts | PIM | GP | G | A | Pts | PIM |
|---|---|---|---|---|---|---|---|---|---|---|---|---|
| 1988–89 | Enköpings HK | SWE III | 7 | 0 | 1 | 1 | 0 | — | — | — | — | — |
| 1989–90 | Enköpings HK | SWE III | 24 | 1 | 2 | 3 | 28 | — | — | — | — | — |
| 1990–91 | R/A 73 HC | SWE II | 30 | 2 | 3 | 5 | 22 | — | — | — | — | — |
| 1991–92 | AIK | SEL | 10 | 0 | 0 | 0 | 2 | 3 | 0 | 0 | 0 | 2 |
| 1992–93 | AIK | SEL | 22 | 1 | 0 | 1 | 18 | — | — | — | — | — |
| 1992–93 | AIK | Allsv | 18 | 0 | 2 | 2 | 6 | 2 | 0 | 0 | 0 | 2 |
| 1993–94 | AIK | SWE II | 40 | 6 | 12 | 18 | 26 | — | — | — | — | — |
| 1994–95 | AIK | SEL | 40 | 3 | 7 | 10 | 38 | — | — | — | — | — |
| 1995–96 | AIK | SEL | 40 | 5 | 6 | 11 | 30 | — | — | — | — | — |
| 1996–97 | AIK | SEL | 49 | 3 | 6 | 9 | 42 | 7 | 1 | 2 | 3 | 8 |
| 1997–98 | AIK | SEL | 43 | 8 | 4 | 12 | 42 | — | — | — | — | — |
| 1998–99 | MIF Redhawks | SEL | 50 | 10 | 12 | 22 | 42 | 8 | 0 | 4 | 4 | 10 |
| 1999–2000 | Mighty Ducks of Anaheim | NHL | 50 | 2 | 7 | 9 | 20 | — | — | — | — | — |
| 1999–2000 | Cincinnati Mighty Ducks | AHL | 2 | 0 | 0 | 0 | 0 | — | — | — | — | — |
| 2000–01 | Mighty Ducks of Anaheim | NHL | 47 | 4 | 10 | 14 | 34 | — | — | — | — | — |
| 2001–02 | Mighty Ducks of Anaheim | NHL | 52 | 1 | 2 | 3 | 40 | — | — | — | — | — |
| 2002–03 | Mighty Ducks of Anaheim | NHL | 82 | 11 | 22 | 33 | 30 | 21 | 0 | 4 | 4 | 2 |
| 2003–04 | Mighty Ducks of Anaheim | NHL | 79 | 6 | 20 | 26 | 28 | — | — | — | — | — |
| 2004–05 | Södertälje SK | SEL | 46 | 2 | 2 | 4 | 60 | 10 | 1 | 1 | 2 | 18 |
| 2005–06 | Atlanta Thrashers | NHL | 82 | 4 | 28 | 32 | 48 | — | — | — | — | — |
| 2006–07 | Atlanta Thrashers | NHL | 77 | 3 | 18 | 21 | 52 | 4 | 0 | 2 | 2 | 0 |
| 2007–08 | Atlanta Thrashers | NHL | 81 | 1 | 13 | 14 | 42 | — | — | — | — | — |
| 2008–09 | Atlanta Thrashers | NHL | 63 | 2 | 13 | 15 | 42 | — | — | — | — | — |
| 2008–09 | New Jersey Devils | NHL | 15 | 0 | 4 | 4 | 6 | 7 | 0 | 1 | 1 | 2 |
| 2009–10 | Linköpings HC | SEL | 53 | 3 | 10 | 13 | 28 | 12 | 0 | 5 | 5 | 18 |
| 2010–11 | Linköpings HC | SEL | 50 | 5 | 17 | 22 | 22 | 7 | 2 | 2 | 4 | 2 |
| 2011–12 | Linköpings HC | SEL | 55 | 7 | 9 | 16 | 24 | — | — | — | — | — |
| 2012–13 | Linköpings HC | SEL | 55 | 3 | 11 | 14 | 28 | 10 | 0 | 0 | 0 | 4 |
| SEL totals | | | 513 | 50 | 84 | 134 | 378 | 57 | 4 | 14 | 18 | 62 |
| NHL totals | | | 628 | 34 | 137 | 171 | 342 | 32 | 0 | 7 | 7 | 4 |

=== International ===
Medal record

Representing Sweden

Olympic Games
| Gold medal – first place | 2006 Turin | |

World Championships
| Gold medal – first place | 1998 Zürich | |
| Silver medal – second place | 2004 Prague | |

World Junior Championship
| Silver medal – second place | 1993 Gävle | |

| Year | Team | Event | GP | G | A | Pts | PIM |
|---|---|---|---|---|---|---|---|
| 1991 | Sweden | EJC | 6 | 1 | 0 | 1 | — |
| 1993 | Sweden | WJC | 7 | 0 | 0 | 0 | 10 |
| 1998 | Sweden | WC | 9 | 0 | 2 | 2 | 8 |
| 2004 | Sweden | WC | 9 | 0 | 2 | 2 | 0 |
| 2006 | Sweden | OG | 7 | 0 | 0 | 0 | 4 |
| Junior totals | | | 14 | 1 | 0 | 1 | — |
| Senior totals | | | 25 | 0 | 4 | 4 | 12 |

== Career transactions ==
- Selected by the Mighty Ducks of Anaheim in the 1999 NHL Entry Draft as a 3rd round pick, 83rd overall.
- Traded to Atlanta for Kurtis Foster on June 26, 2004.
- Traded to New Jersey Devils for Anssi Salmela on March 2, 2009.

== Charitable work ==
While playing for the Thrashers, Hävelid operated an Atlanta-based charity named Havelid's Helpers that worked in conjunction with Habitat For Humanity to provide housing for low income families.

== Personal ==
Hävelid's son Mattias is a prospect of the San Jose Sharks, who selected him 45th overall in the 2022 NHL entry draft.

== See also ==
- List of Mighty Ducks of Anaheim players
- List of Atlanta Thrashers players

| Preceded by Garnet Exelby, 2004 | Winner of the Dan Snyder Memorial Award; 2006 | Succeeded by Slava Kozlov |
