= Anssi Salmela =

Finnish ice hockey player

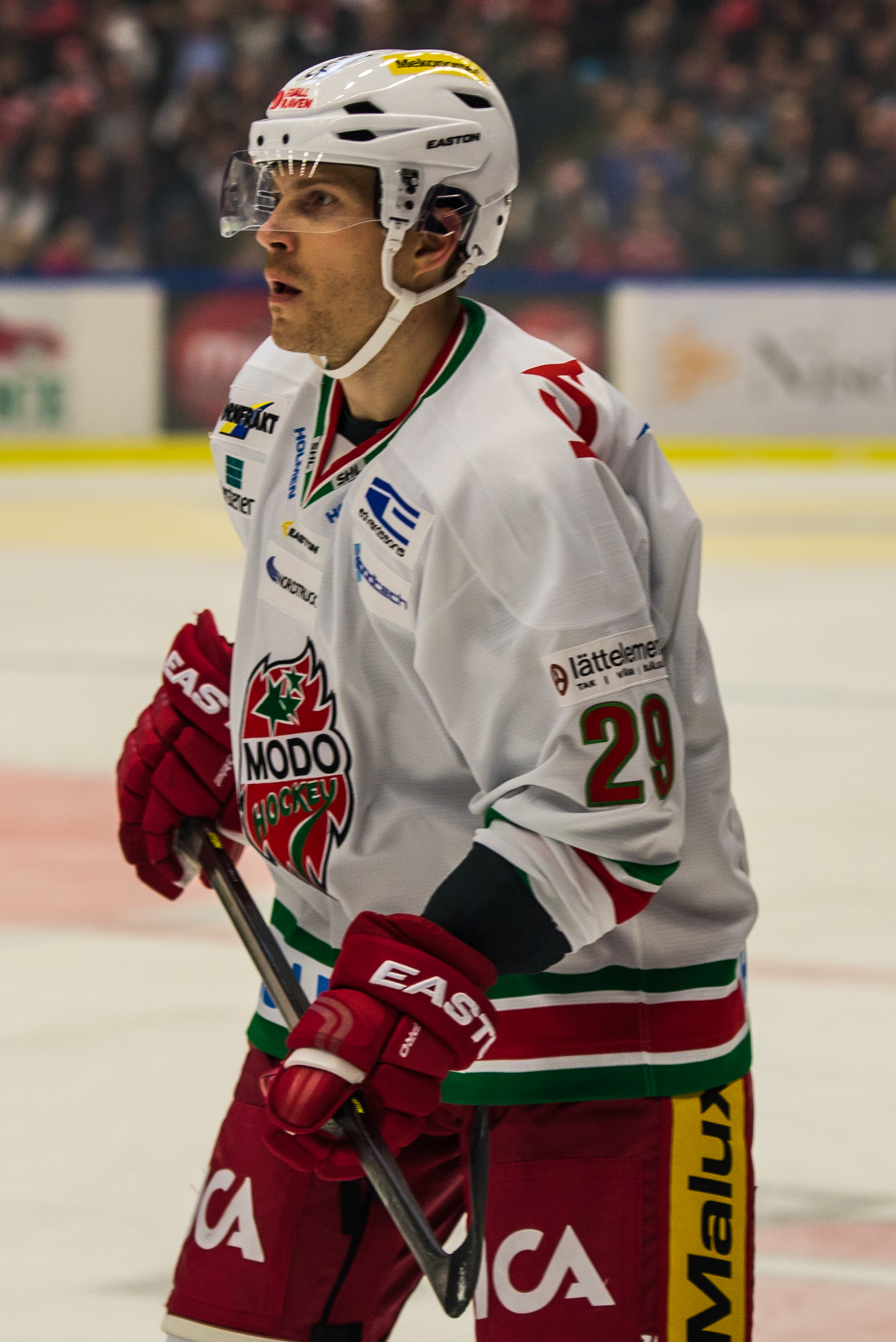
- Salmela with Modo Hockey in 2013
- Born: 13 August 1984 (age 42) Nokia, Finland
- Height: 6 ft 1 in (185 cm)
- Weight: 201 lb (91 kg; 14 st 5 lb)
- Position: Defence
- Shot: Left
- Played for: Tappara; Lahti Pelicans; New Jersey Devils; Atlanta Thrashers; Avangard Omsk; Modo Hockey; HV71; Färjestad BK; Brynäs IF; Kunlun Red Star; Linköpings HC; Dinamo Riga; EHC Biel; Ilves
- National team: Finland
- NHL draft: Undrafted
- Playing career: 2003–2021

Anssi Salmela (born 13 August 1984) is a Finnish former professional ice hockey defenceman who played in the National Hockey League (NHL) with the New Jersey Devils and Atlanta Thrashers.

== Playing career ==
Undrafted, Salmela's professional career started in the 2003–04 season with Finnish SM-liiga side Tappara, where he made his debut on 24 January 2004. His place was settled in Tappara for another year, but the next year he was transferred to Pelicans. In 2007, he moved back to Tappara.

Salmela was a member of Team Finland that won a bronze medal in the World Under-20 Championship. He made his debut for the senior national team in the 2008 IIHF World Championships held in Canada in 2008. On 22 May 2008, he signed a one-year, two-way contract with the New Jersey Devils of the NHL.

In the 2008–09 season, Salmela made his NHL and North American debut with New Jersey in the season opener on 10 October 2008, in a 2–1 win over the New York Islanders. However, Salmela spent the majority of his time with the Devils affiliate the Lowell Devils of the American Hockey League (AHL). On 2 March 2009, Salmela was traded by the Devils to the Atlanta Thrashers for Niclas Hävelid. In his second game with the Thrashers Salmela scored his first career NHL goal in a 5–1 win against the Washington Capitals on 16 March 2009.

On 4 February 2010, Salmela was traded back to the New Jersey Devils along with Ilya Kovalchuk for Johnny Oduya, Niclas Bergfors, Patrice Cormier and a 1st-round draft pick in the 2010 NHL entry draft. Salmela scored only one goal in 2010–11, but it was a big one. On 12 March, he scored an overtime goal against Al Montoya to give the Devils a 3–2 victory over the New York Islanders. Salmela did not receive a qualifying offer from the Devils following the 2010–11 season, making him an unrestricted free agent. He signed a two-year contract with Avangard Omsk in the Kontinental Hockey League (KHL), reportedly for US$1.5 million per season, on 15 July 2011. When his contract was up at the end of the 2012–13 season, he moved to Sweden, penning a deal with Modo Hockey, before transferring to fellow SHL side HV71 during the 2013-14 campaign. In the following two years, he played for two more SHL clubs, Färjestad BK and Brynäs IF.

He was signed by newly founded KHL side Red Star Kunlun from Beijing, China, in July 2016 and left the team by mutual consent in November 2016.

On 5 June 2018, Salmela agreed to a one-year contract with EHC Biel of the National League (NL). On 4 December 2018, Salmela was signed to an early one-year contract extension by Biel through the end of the 2019–20 season.

== Career statistics ==
=== Regular season and playoffs ===
			Regular season					Playoffs
Season	Team	League	GP	G	A	Pts	PIM	GP	G	A	Pts	PIM
2003–04	Tappara Tampere	SM-l	10	0	0	0	2	3	0	0	0	2
2004–05	Tappara Tampere	SM-l	48	1	5	6	49	8	0	0	0	0
2005–06	Tappara Tampere	SM-l	8	0	1	1	0	—	—	—	—	—
2005–06	Pelicans	SM-l	48	8	8	16	59	—	—	—	—	—
2006–07	Pelicans	SM-l	56	11	12	23	58	6	1	1	2	4
2007–08	Tappara Tampere	SM-l	56	16	16	32	40	11	0	6	6	14
2008–09	New Jersey Devils	NHL	17	0	3	3	6	—	—	—	—	—
2008–09	Lowell Devils	AHL	38	8	16	24	41	—	—	—	—	—
2008–09	Chicago Wolves	AHL	2	0	0	0	0	—	—	—	—	—
2008–09	Atlanta Thrashers	NHL	9	1	2	3	2	—	—	—	—	—
2009–10	Atlanta Thrashers	NHL	29	1	4	5	22	—	—	—	—	—
2009–10	New Jersey Devils	NHL	9	1	2	3	0	—	—	—	—	—
2010–11	New Jersey Devils	NHL	48	1	6	7	14	—	—	—	—	—
2010–11	Albany Devils	AHL	2	0	0	0	0	—	—	—	—	—
2011–12	Avangard Omsk	KHL	22	6	4	10	14	21	1	3	4	16
2012–13	Avangard Omsk	KHL	37	2	12	14	37	11	0	1	1	6
2013–14	Modo Hockey	SHL	8	2	4	6	20	—	—	—	—	—
2013–14	HV71	SHL	36	7	14	21	64	5	1	1	2	2
2014–15	Färjestad BK	SHL	42	6	17	23	28	3	1	2	3	4
2015–16	Brynäs IF	SHL	24	4	11	15	47	3	0	1	1	4
2016–17	Kunlun Red Star	KHL	10	3	2	5	8	—	—	—	—	—
2016–17	Linköpings HC	SHL	32	4	14	18	28	6	0	2	2	2
2017–18	Dinamo Riga	KHL	33	5	12	17	18	—	—	—	—	—
2018–19	EHC Biel	NL	49	10	11	21	28	12	0	5	5	6
2019–20	EHC Biel	NL	37	5	11	16	10	—	—	—	—	—
2020–21	Ilves	Liiga	23	3	5	8	24	5	0	0	0	4
Liiga totals			249	39	47	86	232	33	1	7	8	24
NHL totals			112	4	17	21	44	—	—	—	—	—
KHL totals			102	16	30	46	77	32	1	4	5	22

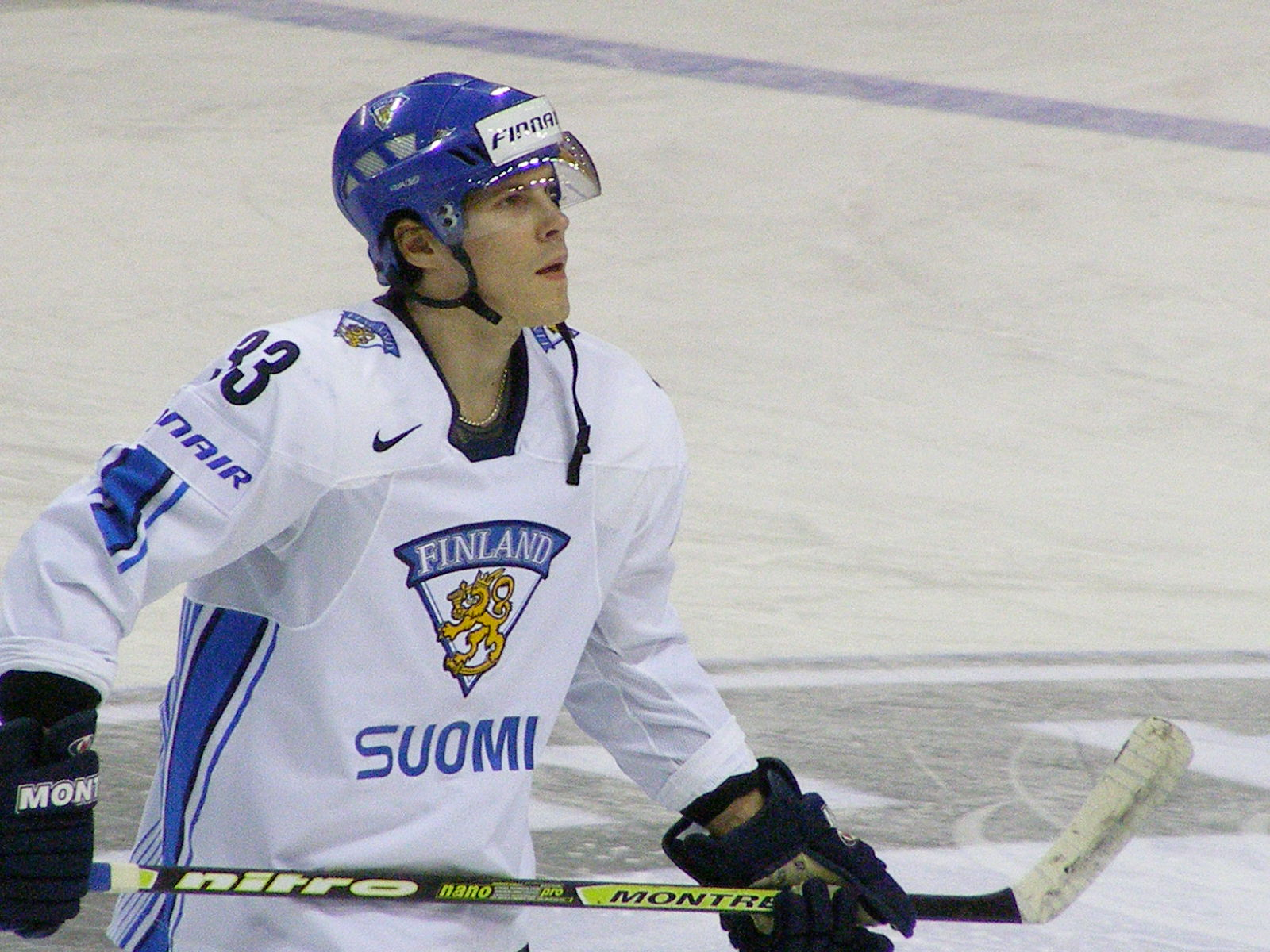
- Salmela with Finland.

Medal record

Representing Finland

Ice hockey

World Championships
Gold medal – first place	2011 Slovakia	
Silver medal – second place	2016 Russia	
Bronze medal – third place	2008 Canada	

World Junior Championships
Bronze medal – third place	2004 Finland	

=== International ===
Year	Team	Event	Result	GP	G	A	Pts	PIM
2004	Finland	WJC	3rd place, bronze medalist(s)	7	1	2	3	6
2008	Finland	WC	3rd place, bronze medalist(s)	8	0	0	0	37
2009	Finland	WC	5th	7	1	0	1	2
2011	Finland	WC	1st place, gold medalist(s)	9	1	2	3	4
2012	Finland	WC	4th	7	0	2	2	25
2015	Finland	WC	6th	8	0	2	2	4
2016	Finland	WC	2nd place, silver medalist(s)	5	0	1	1	2
Junior totals				7	1	2	3	6
Senior totals				44	2	7	9	74

== Awards and honours ==
Award	Year
Liiga
Bronze Medal (Tappara)	2007–08
Juha Rantasila Trophy (most goals for defenseman)	2007–08
