= Tim Stapleton =

American ice hockey player (born 1982)

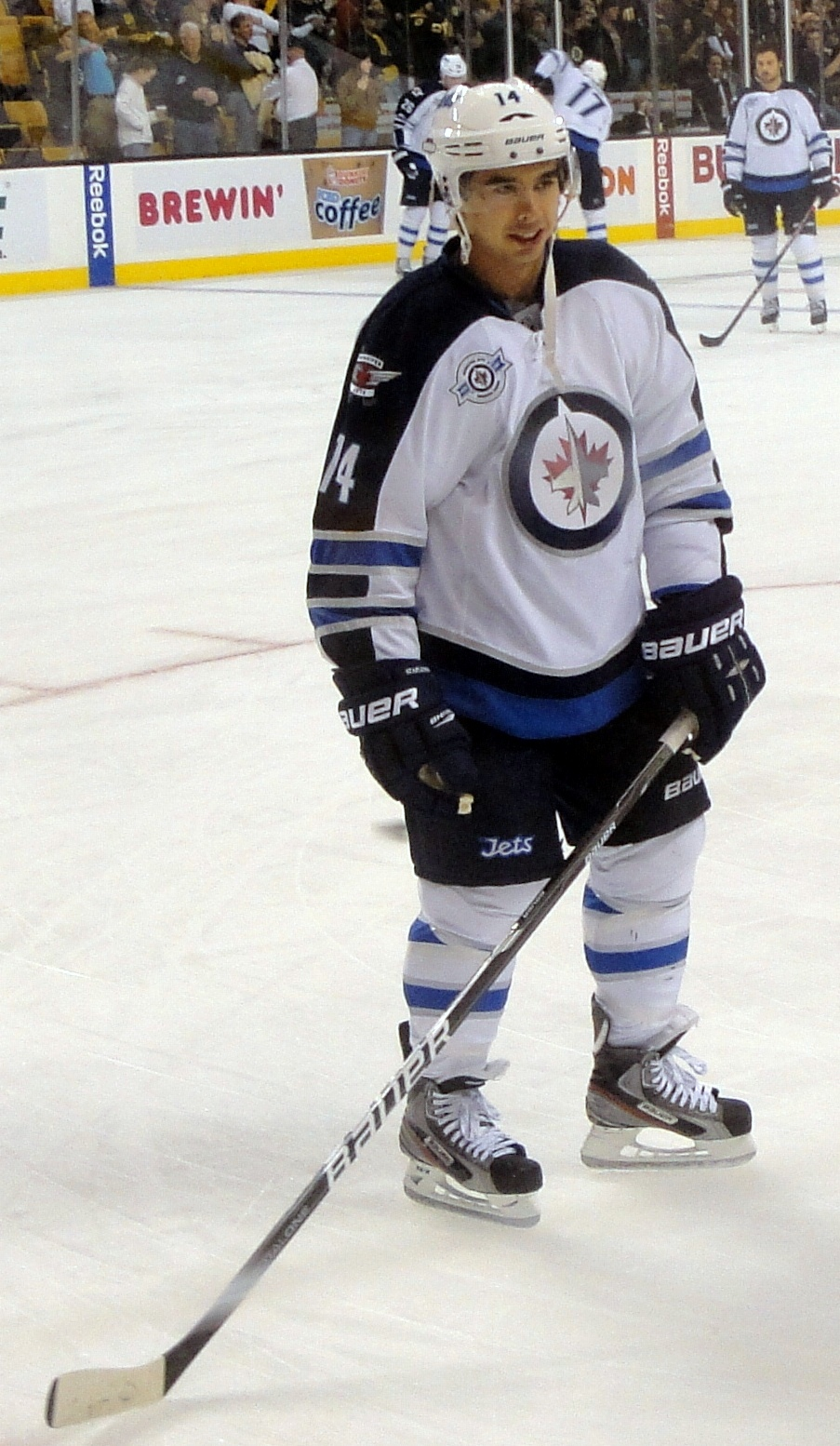
- Stapleton with the Winnipeg Jets in 2011
- Born: July 19, 1982 (age 44) La Grange, Illinois, U.S.
- Height: 5 ft 9 in (175 cm)
- Weight: 180 lb (82 kg; 12 st 12 lb)
- Position: Center
- Shot: Right
- Played for: Jokerit; Toronto Maple Leafs; Atlanta Thrashers; Winnipeg Jets; HC Dinamo Minsk; Ak Bars Kazan; Neftekhimik Nizhnekamsk; Metallurg Magnitogorsk; HC Lugano; Färjestad BK; HC Spartak Moscow; ERC Ingolstadt
- National team: United States
- NHL draft: Undrafted
- Playing career: 2006–2018

Timothy Gabriel Stapleton (born July 19, 1982) is an American former professional ice hockey center. He played in the National Hockey League (NHL) with the Toronto Maple Leafs, Atlanta Thrashers and Winnipeg Jets between 2008 and 2012. In 2011, Stapleton scored the last goal in Thrashers' history. He is the first player of Filipino descent to play a game in the NHL.

== Playing career ==
Undrafted, Stapleton played for two seasons with the Green Bay Gamblers of the United States Hockey League. Stapleton then represented the University of Minnesota Duluth for four seasons, where he led the team in scoring as a freshman and had back-to-back 40 point seasons.

After a brief stint with the Portland Pirates of the American Hockey League, he signed with Jokerit of the Finnish SM-liiga, completing a tryout which led to a one-year contract. During his first Jokerit season, Stapleton won the SM-liiga silver medal and finished second in playoff scoring.

On June 6, 2008, Stapleton signed as a free agent to the Toronto Maple Leafs for the 2008–09 season. Stapleton was assigned to the Toronto Marlies of the American Hockey League on September 26, 2008.

On 26 February 2009, Stapleton played his first career NHL game with the Toronto Maple Leafs, scoring the shootout winner. In his next game Stapleton was credited with his first NHL goal against the Ottawa Senators, goaltender Brian Elliott on February 28, 2009.

On July 1, 2009, Stapleton was traded to the Atlanta Thrashers with Pavel Kubina for Garnet Exelby and Colin Stuart. After signing with the Thrashers, Stapleton was then assigned to affiliate, the Chicago Wolves, for the 2009–10 season.

For the 2010–2011 season, Stapleton signed a professional Try-out agreement with the San Antonio Rampage of the AHL. On November 30, 2010, Stapleton was signed to a 2-year contract by the Atlanta Thrashers.

On February 27, 2011, Stapleton scored his first goal since April 16, 2010. It was against his former team, the Toronto Maple Leafs. He was invited and accepted an invitation to join the United States national team for the 2011 IIHF World Championship, 2013 IIHF World Championship, and 2014 IIHF World Championship, winning bronze in 2013.

At 13:15 of the 3rd period on April 10, 2011, against Brent Johnson of the Pittsburgh Penguins, Stapleton would score the final goal in the final game in Thrashers' history. The following season, the Thrashers, including Stapleton, moved to Canada to become the Winnipeg Jets. For the first time Stapleton remained at the NHL level for an entire season, often playing the point on the power play despite playing his even-strength minutes as a third- or fourth-line forward; partly because of this, he logged career highs (and more than doubled his career NHL totals) in games played, goals, assists and points.

Despite this performance, Stapleton was not re-signed by the Jets when his contract expired the following summer. On July 10, 2012, it was announced that Stapleton had agreed to terms with Dinamo Minsk of the Kontinental Hockey League. After a good performance with Dinamo, he signed in 2013 a two-year deal with Ak Bars Kazan.

After only one-season with Ak Bars, Stapleton was released from the remaining year of his contract and joined fellow KHL club, Neftekhimik Nizhnekamsk on a one-year deal on July 11, 2014. Stapleton was traded to Metallurg Magnitogorsk on December 15, 2014.

On April 17, 2015, Stapleton left the KHL and signed a one-year contract with Swiss club, EHC Biel of the NLA.

On August 1, 2016 he signed with the Karlstad-based, Swedish club Färjestad BK, of the Swedish Hockey League (SHL). After collecting just 4 points in 20 games, he parted company with the team on November 26, 2016, and inked a deal with HC Spartak Moscow in a return to the KHL for the remainder of the 2016–17 campaign the following day.

On April 21, 2017, Stapleton agreed to a one-year contract with EHC Olten of the Swiss League (SL). He contributed with 21 points in 29 games before opting to leave Switzerland and join German club, ERC Ingolstadt of the Deutsche Eishockey Liga for the closing stages of the 2017–18 season on January 6, 2018.

== Personal life ==
Despite being born and raised in the Chicago area, Stapleton is not related to 1970s Chicago Blackhawks star defenseman Pat Stapleton or former Winnipeg Jets and Atlanta Thrashers forward Mike Stapleton, despite wearing the latter's number with both franchises. Stapleton is half Filipino and half Irish.

Stapleton was Co-Host of the Raw Knuckles Podcast With Chris "Knuckles" Nilan.

== Career statistics ==
=== Regular season and playoffs ===
			Regular season					Playoffs
Season	Team	League	GP	G	A	Pts	PIM	GP	G	A	Pts	PIM
1996–97	Fenwick High School	HS=IL	—	—	—	—	—	—	—	—	—	—
1997–98	Fenwick High School	HS-IL	—	—	—	—	—	—	—	—	—	—
1998–99	Chicago Chill 16U AAA	16U AAA	—	—	—	—	—	—	—	—	—	—
1999–00	Chicago Chill 16U AAA	16U AAA	—	—	—	—	—	—	—	—	—	—
2000–01	Green Bay Gamblers	USHL	52	7	15	22	8	4	1	2	3	4
2001–02	Green Bay Gamblers	USHL	61	24	36	60	10	7	4	7	11	0
2002–03	University of Minnesota Duluth	WCHA	42	14	28	42	6	—	—	—	—	—
2003–04	University of Minnesota Duluth	WCHA	43	16	25	41	18	—	—	—	—	—
2004–05	University of Minnesota Duluth	WCHA	38	19	20	39	6	—	—	—	—	—
2005–06	University of Minnesota Duluth	WCHA	39	14	16	30	4	—	—	—	—	—
2005–06	Portland Pirates	AHL	9	0	5	5	4	4	0	0	0	2
2006–07	Jokerit	SM-l	56	19	29	48	28	10	6	4	10	8
2007–08	Jokerit	SM-l	55	28	33	61	36	14	9	8	17	8
2008–09	Toronto Marlies	AHL	70	28	51	79	26	6	2	0	2	2
2008–09	Toronto Maple Leafs	NHL	4	1	0	1	0	—	—	—	—	—
2009–10	Chicago Wolves	AHL	73	30	29	59	18	14	4	9	13	12
2009–10	Atlanta Thrashers	NHL	6	2	0	2	2	—	—	—	—	—
2010–11	Atlanta Thrashers	NHL	45	5	2	7	12	—	—	—	—	—
2010–11	Chicago Wolves	AHL	4	1	3	4	2	—	—	—	—	—
2010–11	San Antonio Rampage	AHL	20	8	7	15	2	—	—	—	—	—
2011–12	Winnipeg Jets	NHL	63	11	16	27	10	—	—	—	—	—
2012–13	Dinamo Minsk	KHL	52	24	16	40	30	—	—	—	—	—
2013–14	Ak Bars Kazan	KHL	54	16	17	33	16	6	0	1	1	2
2014–15	Neftekhimik Nizhnekamsk	KHL	37	14	12	26	30	—	—	—	—	—
2014–15	Metallurg Magnitogorsk	KHL	18	4	1	5	10	9	4	0	4	14
2015–16	EHC Biel	NLA	24	5	8	13	20	—	—	—	—	—
2015–16	HC Lugano	NLA	19	6	8	14	8	5	1	0	1	6
2016–17	Färjestad BK	SHL	20	1	3	4	4	—	—	—	—	—
2016–17	HC Spartak Moscow	KHL	22	1	6	7	4	—	—	—	—	—
2017–18	EHC Olten	SWI-2	29	9	12	21	6	—	—	—	—	—
2017–18	ERC Ingolstadt	DEL	8	3	6	9	0	5	1	0	1	0
AHL totals			176	67	95	162	52	24	6	9	15	16
NHL totals			118	19	18	37	24	—	—	—	—	—
KHL totals			183	59	52	111	90	15	4	1	5	16

Medal record

Representing United States

Ice hockey

World Championships
Bronze medal – third place	2013 Sweden/Finland	

=== International ===
Year	Team	Event	Result	GP	G	A	Pts	PIM
2011	United States	WC	8th	7	0	1	1	0
2013	United States	WC	3rd place, bronze medalist(s)	10	2	3	5	2
2014	United States	WC	6th	8	0	2	2	2
Senior totals				25	2	6	8	4
