= Garnet Exelby =

Canadian ice hockey player (born 1981)

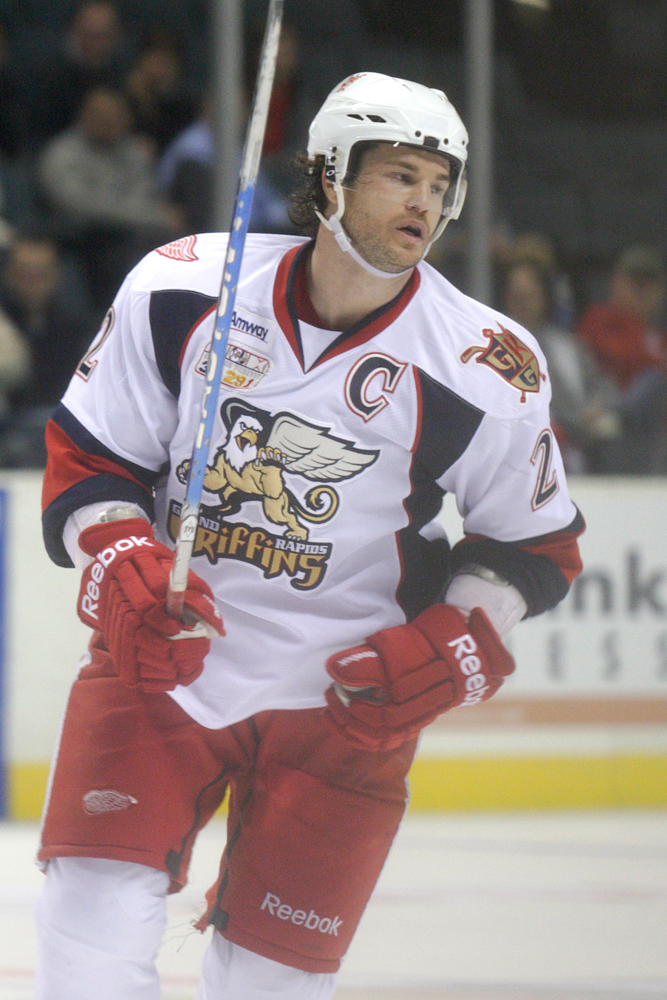
- Exelby with the Grand Rapids Griffins in 2011
- Born: August 16, 1981 (age 45) Craik, Saskatchewan, Canada
- Height: 6 ft 1 in (185 cm)
- Weight: 215 lb (98 kg; 15 st 5 lb)
- Position: Defence
- Shot: Left
- Played for: Atlanta Thrashers; Toronto Maple Leafs; Dornbirner EC
- NHL draft: 217th overall, 1999; Atlanta Thrashers
- Playing career: 2001–2015

John Garnet Exelby (born August 16, 1981) is a Canadian former professional ice hockey defenceman who played in the National Hockey League (NHL) with the Atlanta Thrashers and Toronto Maple Leafs. He was particularly known for his aggressive style of play and his checking abilities.

== Playing career ==
After one season played with the Saskatoon Blades of the Western Hockey League (WHL) in 1998–99, Exelby was drafted by the Atlanta Thrashers in the eighth round, 217th overall, of the 1999 NHL entry draft. He would continue playing in the WHL for the next two season with the Blades and Regina Pats.

In the 2001–02 season, Exelby played in the American Hockey League (AHL) for the Chicago Wolves, winning the Calder Cup. Exelby was called up by the Thrashers midway through the 2002–03 season.

On July 1, 2009, Exelby (along with Colin Stuart) was traded to the Toronto Maple Leafs in exchange for Pavel Kubina and Tim Stapleton.

Exelby became a free agent on July 1, 2010. He was invited on a try-out basis with the New York Rangers, but was released on September 27.

On November 26, 2010, Exelby signed a one-year contract with the Chicago Blackhawks, after which he was assigned to their AHL affiliate, the Rockford IceHogs.

On July 5, 2011, Exelby signed a one-year contract with the Detroit Red Wings with the expectation that he would provide depth for their AHL affiliate, the Grand Rapids Griffins.

On July 11, 2012, as a free agent, Exelby signed a one-year, two-way contract with the Boston Bruins. He did not make an appearance with Boston, instead serving as an alternate captain for their AHL affiliate, the Providence Bruins.

After captaining the Norfolk Admirals on one-year AHL contract in the 2013–14 season, and having not played in the NHL since 2010, on July 16, 2014, Exelby left North America to sign a one-year contract with Austrian Hockey League club Dornbirner EC. After 17 scoreless games with Dornbirner in the 2014–15 season, he opted to end his tenure in Austria, leaving the club on December 1, 2014.

== Career statistics ==
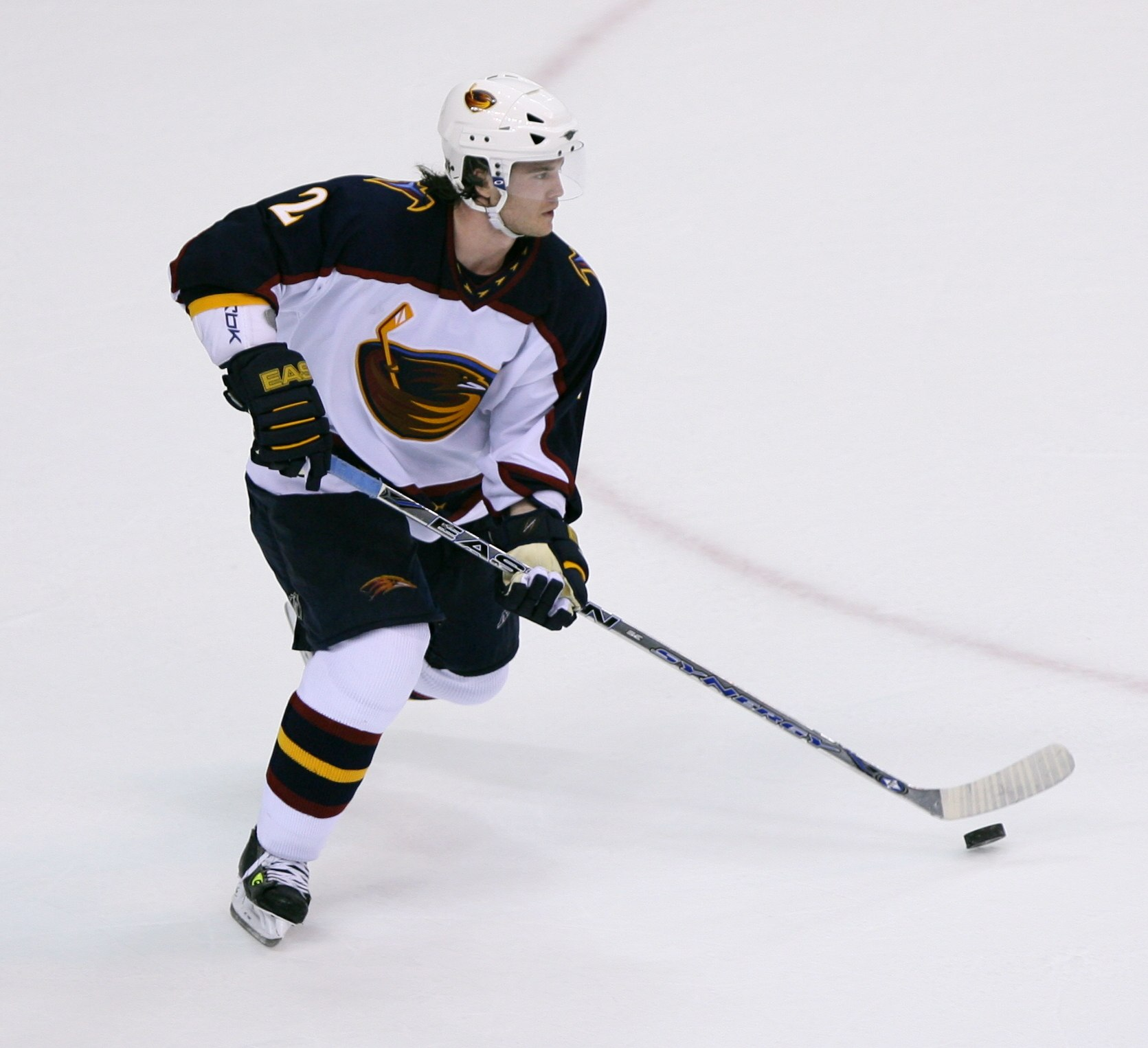
Exelby with the Atlanta Thrashers in 2007

			Regular season					Playoffs
Season	Team	League	GP	G	A	Pts	PIM	GP	G	A	Pts	PIM
1997–98	Winnipeg South Blues	MJHL	46	5	11	16	110	—	—	—	—	—
1998–99	Saskatoon Blades	WHL	61	5	3	8	91	—	—	—	—	—
1999–2000	Saskatoon Blades	WHL	63	1	8	9	79	11	0	2	2	21
2000–01	Saskatoon Blades	WHL	43	5	10	15	110	—	—	—	—	—
2000–01	Regina Pats	WHL	22	2	8	10	51	6	0	2	2	2
2001–02	Chicago Wolves	AHL	75	3	4	7	257	25	0	4	4	49
2002–03	Atlanta Thrashers	NHL	15	0	2	2	41	—	—	—	—	—
2002–03	Chicago Wolves	AHL	53	3	6	9	140	9	0	1	1	27
2003–04	Atlanta Thrashers	NHL	71	1	9	10	134	—	—	—	—	—
2005–06	Atlanta Thrashers	NHL	75	1	9	10	75	—	—	—	—	—
2006–07	Atlanta Thrashers	NHL	58	2	8	10	56	4	0	0	0	6
2007–08	Atlanta Thrashers	NHL	79	2	5	7	85	—	—	—	—	—
2008–09	Atlanta Thrashers	NHL	59	0	7	7	120	—	—	—	—	—
2009–10	Toronto Maple Leafs	NHL	51	1	3	4	73	—	—	—	—	—
2010–11	Rockford IceHogs	AHL	77	3	10	13	128	—	—	—	—	—
2011–12	Grand Rapids Griffins	AHL	75	7	14	21	177	—	—	—	—	—
2012–13	Providence Bruins	AHL	52	2	7	9	95	12	0	2	2	31
2013–14	Norfolk Admirals	AHL	72	0	18	18	111	8	0	1	1	0
2014–15	Dornbirner EC	EBEL	17	0	0	0	82	—	—	—	—	—
2015–16	Sun Valley Suns	BDHL	2	0	0	0	9	—	—	—	—	—
NHL totals			408	7	43	50	584	4	0	0	0	6

== Awards and honours ==
Award	Year
AHL
Calder Cup (Chicago Wolves)	2002
Atlanta Thrashers
Dan Snyder Memorial Award	2004

== Career transactions ==
- Selected by the Atlanta Thrashers in the 1999 NHL Entry Draft as an eighth round choice, 217th overall.
- Traded to Regina Pats (WHL) by Saskatoon Blades (WHL) for Scott Balan and future considerations, January 15, 2001.
- Called up during the NHL 2002–03 season.
- Traded to Toronto Maple Leafs along with Colin Stuart for Pavel Kubina and Tim Stapleton, July 1, 2009
- Signed to the Detroit Red Wings, July 5, 2011
- Signed by the Boston Bruins as a free agent, July 11, 2012

Awards and achievements
Preceded by None	Winner of the Dan Snyder Memorial Award; 2004	Succeeded by Niclas Hävelid
