= Bryan Little =

Canadian ice hockey player (born 1987)

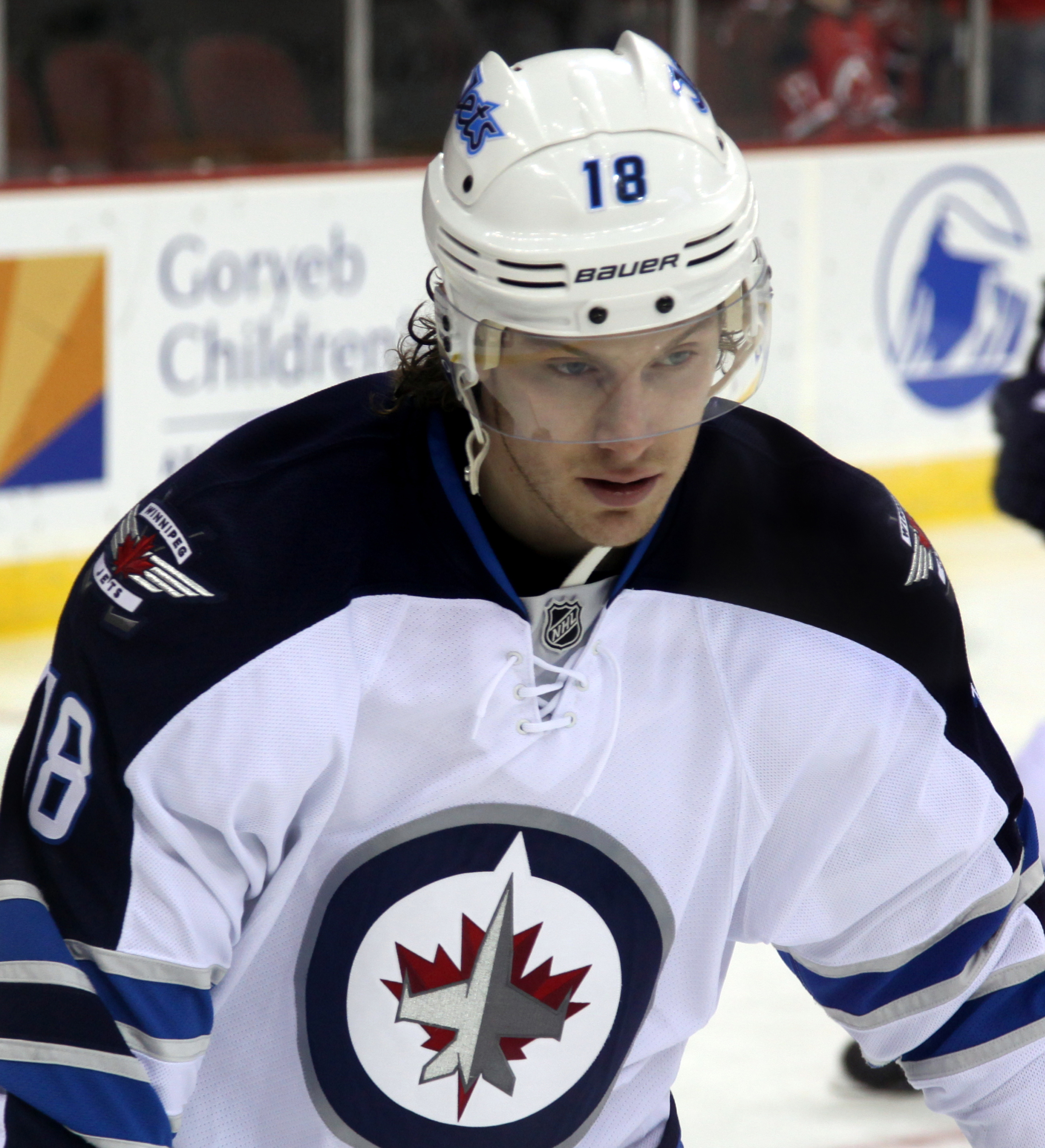
- Little with the Winnipeg Jets in March 2013
- Born: November 12, 1987 (age 38) Edmonton, Alberta, Canada
- Height: 6 ft 0 in (183 cm)
- Weight: 191 lb (87 kg; 13 st 9 lb)
- Position: Centre
- Shot: Right
- Played for: Atlanta Thrashers; Winnipeg Jets
- NHL draft: 12th overall, 2006; Atlanta Thrashers
- Playing career: 2007–2019

Bryan Matthew Little (born November 12, 1987) is a Canadian former professional ice hockey centre. Little was selected by the Atlanta Thrashers in the first round, 12th overall, of the 2006 NHL entry draft. He played his entire career with the franchise, including after they moved and became the second iteration of the Winnipeg Jets. In November 2019, Little suffered a career-ending injury; he officially retired in 2024.

== Early life ==
Although Little was born in Edmonton, Alberta, he was raised in Cambridge, Ontario. He grew up with his younger brother Shawn and his parents, Brenda and John. Little played much of his minor ice hockey for the Cambridge Hawks of the Alliance Pavilion League until the 2001–02 season. He played in the 2001 Quebec International Pee-Wee Hockey Tournament with Cambridge. He then played for the Cambridge Winter Hawks Jr. B hockey team at age 14, while he attended Southwood Secondary School until age 15, when he joined the Barrie Colts of the Ontario Hockey League (OHL). Little had been selected in the third round, 50th overall, in the 2003 OHL Draft after a standout season with the Winter Hawks.

== Playing career ==
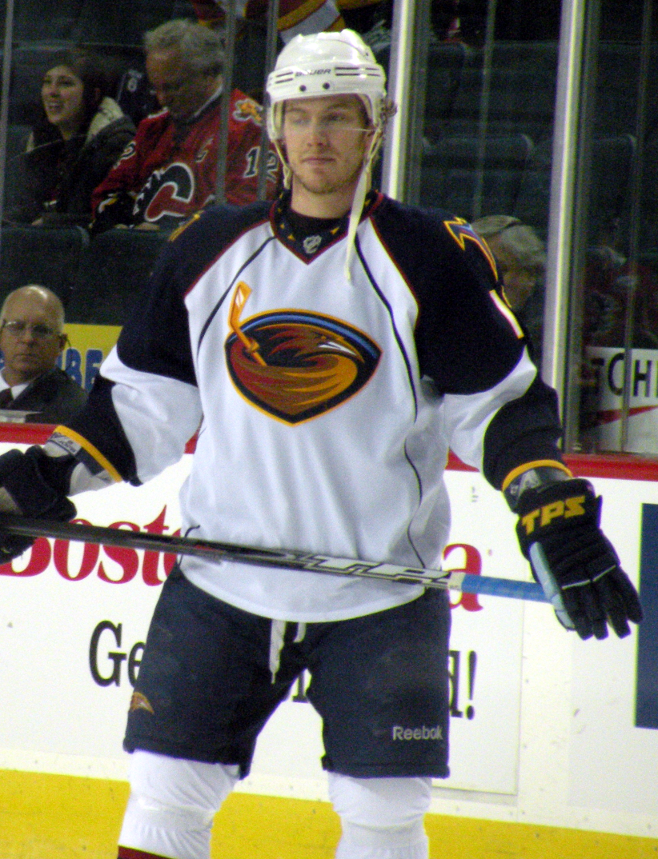
Little as a member of the Atlanta Thrashers in December 2009.

Little was selected first round, 12th overall, in the 2006 NHL entry draft by the Atlanta Thrashers. After four seasons playing for the Barrie Colts in the Ontario Hockey League (OHL), during which he played in the 2006 CHL–NHL Top Prospects Game, Little joined the Thrashers' American Hockey League (AHL) affiliate, the Chicago Wolves, for two games in the 2007 Calder Cup playoffs, recording no points or penalties. According to one local columnist, "He didn't play much, and he was playing out of position, but the biggest thing was that he fit right in ... he played like he'd been there all season."

=== Atlanta Thrashers / Winnipeg Jets (2007–2020) ===
Little signed a three-year, entry-level contract with the Thrashers running until the end of the 2009–10 NHL season. He made the Thrashers' NHL roster out of training camp in 2007 and joined the team full-time. He made his NHL debut on October 5, 2007, scoring in his first game against the Washington Capitals, the first Thrasher ever to do so. However, midway through the season, he was demoted to the Wolves, where he would go on to win the 2008 Calder Cup Championship.

He would spend the entire 2008–09 season with the Thrashers, scoring 31 goals and 20 assists for 51 points in 79 games.

In August 2010, Little signed a three-year, $7.15 million contract extension with Atlanta as a restricted free agent.

After the Thrashers organization relocated to Winnipeg to become the Winnipeg Jets prior to the 2011–12 season, Little changed his uniform number from #10 to #18 out of respect for Dale Hawerchuk, who played for the original Winnipeg Jets from 1981–1990.

On July 22, 2013, Little and the Jets agreed to a five-year, $23.5 million contract extension, avoiding salary arbitration. In the first year of his new contract in 2013–14, Little had a career year offensively, scoring 64 points (23 goals, 41 assists) in all 82 games.

Little would record 24 goals and 28 assists for 52 points in 70 games in the 2014–15 season as the Jets qualified for the playoffs for the first time in Little's career and the first time since the franchise relocated to Winnipeg from Atlanta as the Jets finished the season as the eighth and final seed in the Western Conference. Little played in his first career playoff game on April 16, 2015, in the first game in the opening round of the 2015 playoffs against the top-seeded Anaheim Ducks where the Jets lost 4–2. Little recorded his first career playoff goal in game three on Ducks' goaltender Frederik Andersen in a 5–4 OT loss. Little would score a second goal and also record his first career playoff assist on a Mark Stuart goal as the Jets would lose 5–2 loss as the Ducks completed their sweep against the Jets and Little would finish the playoffs with one goal and two assists for three points in all four games.

The 2015–16 season would come to an early end for Little as he would suffer a fractured vertebra on February 18, 2016 after a hit from Tampa Bay Lightning defenseman Anton Strålman. He ended the injury-shortened season with 17 goals and 25 assists for 42 points in 57 games.

On October 13, 2016 in the 2016–17 season opener against the Carolina Hurricanes, Little suffered an undisclosed lower-body injury after a collision with Hurricanes' forward Bryan Bickell, causing him to miss the next 23 games. Little would then finish another injury-plagued season with 21 goals and 26 assists for 47 points in 59 contests.

He signed a six-year contract extension on September 14, 2017. After two injury-filled seasons, Little enjoyed a healthy 2017–18 campaign as he would finish the season by playing in all 82 games with 16 goals and 27 assists for 43 points to help the Jets into the playoffs for the first time since 2015. In the 2018 playoffs, Little and the Jets would make a deep playoff run as they would go all the way to the Western Conference Finals where the Jets would get defeated in five games by the Vegas Golden Knights. Little would finish the playoffs with one goal and six assists for seven points in all 17 games played.

Little would play all 82 games once more in the 2018–19 season with 15 goals and 26 assists for 41 points.

Little joined the team for the 2019–20 season but sustained a concussion during a preseason game against the Minnesota Wild. He was cleared to play for the regular season but only appeared in seven games before being struck in the side of the head by a shot on November 5. He returned to practice in January but further tests and medical advice resulted in him not returning for the remainder of the season. A month later in February, Little underwent surgery to repair a perforated eardrum.

As a result of the surgery, Little was ruled out for the entirety of the 2020–21 season, regardless of the ongoing COVID-19 pandemic affecting the league schedule.

On March 21, 2022, the Jets traded his contract to the Arizona Coyotes, alongside the rights to prospect Nathan Smith, for a fourth round draft pick. His contract rights, along with the other assets of the Coyotes, were acquired by the Utah Hockey Club on April 18, 2024, when the NHL Board of Governors approved an expansion franchise for Salt Lake City beginning in 2024-25.

On October 20, 2024, Little signed a one day contract with the Winnipeg Jets to officially retire from the NHL as a Jet.

== International play ==
Medal record

Representing Canada

Ice hockey

Ivan Hlinka Memorial Tournament
Gold medal – first place	2005 Piešťany	

IIHF World Junior Championship
Gold medal – first place	2007 Sweden	

Little was first selected in an international tournament for the Team Ontario in 2003–04 in the World Under-17 Hockey Challenge in Newfoundland, winning a gold medal. He was then included with Canadian National Under-18 Summer Team at the 2004 World Junior Cup in Břeclav, Czech Republic, and invited to the December 2005 Canadian World Junior hockey team selection camp. Little was a member of the gold-medal winning 2007 Canadian World Junior hockey team.

== Personal life ==
Little and his wife reside in Cambridge, Ontario. The couple previously resided in Winnipeg during the hockey season.

== Career statistics ==
=== Regular season and playoffs ===
			Regular season					Playoffs
Season	Team	League	GP	G	A	Pts	PIM	GP	G	A	Pts	PIM
2002–03	Cambridge Winter Hawks	MWJHL	40	20	15	35	14	7	1	1	2	0
2003–04	Barrie Colts	OHL	64	34	24	58	18	12	5	5	10	7
2004–05	Barrie Colts	OHL	62	36	32	68	34	4	5	1	6	2
2005–06	Barrie Colts	OHL	64	42	67	109	99	14	8	15	23	19
2006–07	Barrie Colts	OHL	57	41	66	107	77	8	4	5	9	8
2006–07	Chicago Wolves	AHL	—	—	—	—	—	2	0	0	0	0
2007–08	Atlanta Thrashers	NHL	48	6	10	16	18	—	—	—	—	—
2007–08	Chicago Wolves	AHL	34	9	16	25	10	24	8	4	12	10
2008–09	Atlanta Thrashers	NHL	79	31	20	51	24	—	—	—	—	—
2009–10	Atlanta Thrashers	NHL	79	13	21	34	20	—	—	—	—	—
2010–11	Atlanta Thrashers	NHL	76	18	30	48	33	—	—	—	—	—
2011–12	Winnipeg Jets	NHL	74	24	22	46	26	—	—	—	—	—
2012–13	Winnipeg Jets	NHL	48	7	25	32	4	—	—	—	—	—
2013–14	Winnipeg Jets	NHL	82	23	41	64	58	—	—	—	—	—
2014–15	Winnipeg Jets	NHL	70	24	28	52	24	4	2	1	3	0
2015–16	Winnipeg Jets	NHL	57	17	25	42	12	—	—	—	—	—
2016–17	Winnipeg Jets	NHL	59	21	26	47	18	—	—	—	—	—
2017–18	Winnipeg Jets	NHL	82	16	27	43	28	17	1	5	6	2
2018–19	Winnipeg Jets	NHL	82	15	26	41	26	6	1	2	3	0
2019–20	Winnipeg Jets	NHL	7	2	3	5	2	—	—	—	—	—
NHL totals			843	217	304	521	293	27	4	8	12	2

=== International ===
Year	Team	Event	GP	G	A	Pts	PIM
2004	Canada Ontario	U17	6	4	4	8	4
2005	Canada	U18	5	4	2	6	0
2007	Canada	WJC	6	1	1	2	14
Junior totals			17	9	7	16	18

== Awards and honours ==
- 2003–04 – OHL Rookie of the Year
- 2004–05 – Eastern Conference OHL All–Star
- 2005–06 – Barrie Colts team captain
- 2006–07 – Set the Barrie Colts franchise record for most goals scored with the team (153)
- 2006–07 – Set the Barrie Colts franchise record for most points earned with the team (342)
- 2010–11 – Dan Snyder Memorial Award
- 2013–14 – Dan Snyder Memorial Award
- January 25, 2020 – Barrie Colts jersey retirement

Awards and achievements
Preceded by Alex Bourret	Atlanta Thrashers first-round draft pick 2006	Succeeded by Zach Bogosian
