= 2009–10 Washington Capitals season =

NHL hockey team season

2009–10 Washington Capitals
- Presidents' Trophy winners
- Southeast Division champions
- Division: 1st Southeast
- Conference: 1st Eastern
- 2009–10 record: 54–15–13
- Home record: 30–5–6
- Road record: 24–10–7
- Goals for: 315
- Goals against: 229

Team information
- General manager: George McPhee
- Coach: Bruce Boudreau
- Captain: Chris Clark (Oct.–Dec.); Vacant (Dec. 28 – Jan. 5); Alexander Ovechkin (Jan.–Apr.)
- Alternate captains: Mike Knuble; Alexander Ovechkin (Oct.–Jan.); Tom Poti
- Arena: Verizon Center
- Average attendance: 18,277

Team leaders
- Goals: Alexander Ovechkin (50)
- Assists: Nicklas Backstrom (68)
- Points: Alexander Ovechkin (109)
- Penalty minutes: Alexander Ovechkin (87)
- Plus/minus: Jeff Schultz (+48)
- Wins: Jose Theodore (30)
- Goals against average: Semyon Varlamov (2.54)

The 2009–10 Washington Capitals season was the team's 36th season in the National Hockey League (NHL). The season started with the 2009 NHL entry draft on June 26–27 with the Capitals holding the 24th selection in the draft. On December 28, 2009, the Capitals traded away captain Chris Clark and defenseman Milan Jurcina to the Columbus Blue Jackets in exchange for winger Jason Chimera. On January 5, 2010, Alexander Ovechkin was named the team's new captain, the unanimous choice of his teammates. Ovechkin became the first European, second-youngest and 14th overall captain in team history. From January 13 to February 7, 2010, Washington won 14-straight games. The Capitals eventually finished 2009-10 regular season first in the Eastern Conference and in the NHL with 121 points, securing their first ever President's Trophy while also becoming the first non-Original Six team to ever reach the 120-point plateau. The Capitals finished the regular season in first place in scoring, with 313 goals (excluding five shootout-winning goals). This was the highest total by an NHL team since the 1995–96 season. Seven Washington players reached the 20-goal mark. The Capitals also scored the most power-play goals in the league with 79, and had the best power-play percentage at 25.24% (79 for 313).

Ovechkin led the team with 109 points and finished as the league's third-highest goal scorer, despite playing nine games fewer than the league leaders. Fellow Capital's player Nicklas Bäckström finished the season with 101 points, the fourth-most in the NHL. Mike Green led all defensemen in points, finishing with 76. The Capitals also dominated the plus-minus category, with five players finishing in the top six in the league. Despite enjoying a top-ranked regular season, the Capitals were ousted by the eighth-seeded Montreal Canadiens in the first round of the playoffs in 7 games. Their early post-season exit in 2010 was considered one of the biggest playoff upsets in NHL history.

== Pre-season ==
#	Date	Opponent	Score	Location
1	September 17	Buffalo Sabres	W 4-3 (OT)	HSBC Arena
2	September 19	Chicago Blackhawks	W 3-2 (OT)	United Center
3	September 21	Buffalo Sabres	L 1-2	Verizon Center
4	September 23	Chicago Blackhawks	W 6-2	Verizon Center
5	September 24	New York Rangers	L 2-3	Madison Square Garden
6	September 27	New York Rangers	W 4-3	Verizon Center

== Regular season ==
On December 28, the Capitals traded captain Chris Clark and Milan Jurcina to the Columbus Blue Jackets in exchange for Jason Chimera. On January 5, Alexander Ovechkin was named the team's new captain, the unanimous choice of his teammates.

From January 13 to February 7, 2010, Washington won 14-straight games.

By finishing the regular season with 121 points in the standings, the Capitals became the first non-Original Six team to ever reach the 120-point plateau.

The Capitals finished the regular season in first place in scoring, with 313 goals (excluding five shootout-winning goals). This was the highest total by an NHL team since the 1995–96 season. Seven Washington players reached the 20-goal mark. The Capitals also scored the most power-play goals in the league with 79, and had the best power-play percentage at 25.24% (79 for 313).

=== Divisional standings ===
Southeast Division
		GP	W	L	OTL	GF	GA	Pts
**1**	**p – Washington Capitals**	**82**	**54**	**15**	**13**	**318**	**233**	**121**
2	Atlanta Thrashers	82	35	34	13	234	256	83
3	Carolina Hurricanes	82	35	37	10	230	256	80
4	Tampa Bay Lightning	82	34	36	12	217	260	80
5	Florida Panthers	82	32	37	13	208	244	77

=== Conference standings ===
Eastern Conference
R		Div	GP	W	L	OTL	GF	GA	Pts
**1**	**p – Washington Capitals**	**SE**	**82**	**54**	**15**	**13**	**318**	**233**	121
**2**	**y – New Jersey Devils**	**AT**	**82**	**48**	**27**	**7**	**222**	**191**	103
**3**	**y – Buffalo Sabres**	**NE**	**82**	**45**	**27**	**10**	**235**	**207**	100
**4**	**Pittsburgh Penguins**	**AT**	**82**	**47**	**28**	**7**	**257**	**237**	101
**5**	**Ottawa Senators**	**NE**	**82**	**44**	**32**	**6**	**225**	**238**	94
**6**	**Boston Bruins**	**NE**	**82**	**39**	**30**	**13**	**206**	**200**	91
**7**	**Philadelphia Flyers**	**AT**	**82**	**41**	**35**	**6**	**236**	**225**	88
**8**	**Montreal Canadiens**	**NE**	**82**	**39**	**33**	**10**	**217**	**223**	88
8.5
9	New York Rangers	AT	82	38	33	11	222	218	87
10	Atlanta Thrashers	SE	82	35	34	13	234	256	83
11	Carolina Hurricanes	SE	82	35	37	10	230	256	80
12	Tampa Bay Lightning	SE	82	34	36	12	217	260	80
13	New York Islanders	AT	82	34	37	11	222	264	79
14	Florida Panthers	SE	82	32	37	13	208	244	77
15	Toronto Maple Leafs	NE	82	30	38	14	214	267	74

bold – Qualified for playoffs; y – Won division; p – Won Presidents' Trophy (and division)

AT – Atlantic Division, NE – Northeast Division, SE – Southeast Division

=== Game log ===
2009–10 Game Log
October: 8-2-3 (Home: 4-1-2; Road: 4-1-1)

Game	Date	Opponent	Score	Location	Attendance	Record	Points
1	October 1	Boston Bruins	4 - 1	TD Garden	17,565	1-0-0	2
2	October 3	Toronto Maple Leafs	6 - 4	Verizon Center	18,277	2-0-0	4
3	October 6	Philadelphia Flyers	6 - 5 OT	Wachovia Center	19,567	2-0-1	5
4	October 8	New York Rangers	4 - 3	Verizon Center	18,277	2-1-1	5
5	October 10	Detroit Red Wings	3 - 2	Joe Louis Arena	19,122	2-2-1	5
6	October 12	New Jersey Devils	3 - 2 SO	Verizon Center	18,277	2-2-2	6
7	October 15	San Jose Sharks	4 - 1	Verizon Center	18,277	3-2-2	8
8	October 17	Nashville Predators	3 - 2 SO	Verizon Center	18,277	4-2-2	10
9	October 22	Atlanta Thrashers	5 - 4	Philips Arena	13,192	5-2-2	12
10	October 24	New York Islanders	3 - 2 OT	Nassau Veterans Memorial Coliseum	11,541	6-2-2	14
11	October 27	Philadelphia Flyers	4 - 2	Verizon Center	18,277	7-2-2	16
12	October 29	Atlanta Thrashers	4 - 3	Philips Arena	12,893	8-2-2	18
13	October 30	New York Islanders	4 - 3 OT	Verizon Center	18,277	8-2-3	19

November: 8-3-3 (Home: 4-1-1, Road: 4-2-2)

Game	Date	Opponent	Score	Location	Attendance	Record	Points
14	November 1	Columbus Blue Jackets	4 - 5 OT	Verizon Center	18,277	8-2-4	20
15	November 4	New Jersey Devils	2 - 3	Prudential Center	13,498	8-3-4	20
16	November 6	Florida Panthers	4 - 1	BankAtlantic Center	15,877	9-3-4	22
17	November 7	Florida Panthers	7 - 4	Verizon Center	18,277	10-3-4	24
18	November 11	New York Islanders	5 - 4 SO	Verizon Center	18,277	11-3-4	26
19	November 13	Minnesota Wild	3 - 1	Verizon Center	18,277	12-3-4	28
20	November 14	New Jersey Devils	2 - 5	Prudential Center	16,521	12-4-4	28
21	November 17	New York Rangers	4 - 2	Madison Square Garden	18,200	13-4-4	30
22	November 20	Montreal Canadiens	2 - 3	Verizon Center	18,277	13-5-4	30
23	November 21	Toronto Maple Leafs	1 - 2 SO	Air Canada Centre	19,455	13-5-5	31
24	November 23	Ottawa Senators	3 - 4 OT	Scotiabank Place	16,210	13-5-6	32
25	November 25	Buffalo Sabres	2 - 0	Verizon Center	18,277	14-5-6	34
26	November 28	Montreal Canadiens	4 - 3 SO	Bell Centre	21,273	15-5-6	36
27	November 30	Carolina Hurricanes	3 - 2	RBC Center	12,797	16-5-6	38

December: 8-5-0 (Home: 4-1-0, Road: 4-4-0)

Game	Date	Opponent	Score	Location	Attendance	Record	Points
28	December 3	Florida Panthers	6 - 2	Verizon Center	18,277	17-5-6	40
29	December 5	Philadelphia Flyers	8 - 2	Wachovia Center	19,789	18-5-6	42
30	December 7	Tampa Bay Lightning	3 - 0	St. Pete Times Forum	12,400	19-5-6	44
31	December 9	Buffalo Sabres	0 - 3	HSBC Arena	17,982	19-6-6	44
32	December 11	Carolina Hurricanes	4 - 3 OT	Verizon Center	18,277	20-6-6	46
33	December 12	Toronto Maple Leafs	3 - 6	Air Canada Centre	19,316	20-7-6	46
34	December 15	Colorado Avalanche	6 - 1	Pepsi Center	14,172	21-7-6	48
35	December 18	Vancouver Canucks	2 - 3	GM Place	18,810	21-8-6	48
36	December 19	Edmonton Oilers	4 - 2	Rexall Place	16,839	22-8-6	50
37	December 23	Buffalo Sabres	5 - 2	Verizon Center	18,277	23-8-6	52
38	December 26	New Jersey Devils	4 - 1	Verizon Center	18,277	24-8-6	54
39	December 28	Carolina Hurricanes	3 - 6	Verizon Center	18,277	24-9-6	54
40	December 30	San Jose Sharks	2 - 5	HP Pavilion	17,562	24-10-6	54

January: 13-2-0 (Home: 9-0-0, Road: 4-2-0)

Game	Date	Opponent	Score	Location	Attendance	Record	Points
41	January 2	Los Angeles Kings	1 - 2	Staples Center	18,118	24-11-6	54
42	January 5	Montreal Canadiens	4 - 2	Verizon Center	18,277	25-11-6	56
43	January 7	Ottawa Senators	5 - 2	Verizon Center	18,277	26-11-6	58
44	January 9	Atlanta Thrashers	8 - 1	Philips Arena	16,767	27-11-6	60
45	January 12	Tampa Bay Lightning	4 - 7	St. Pete Times Forum	13,891	27-12-6	60
46	January 13	Florida Panthers	5 - 4 SO	BankAtlantic Center	14,776	28-12-6	62
47	January 15	Toronto Maple Leafs	6 - 1	Verizon Center	18,277	29-12-6	64
48	January 17	Philadelphia Flyers	5 - 3	Verizon Center	18,277	30-12-6	66
49	January 19	Detroit Red Wings	3 - 2	Verizon Center	18,277	31-12-6	68
50	January 21	Pittsburgh Penguins	6 - 3	Mellon Arena	17,132	32-12-6	70
51	January 23	Phoenix Coyotes	4 - 2	Verizon Center	18,277	33-12-6	72
52	January 26	New York Islanders	7 - 2	Nassau Veterans Memorial Coliseum	12,549	34-12-6	74
53	January 27	Anaheim Ducks	5 - 1	Verizon Center	18,277	35-12-6	76
54	January 29	Florida Panthers	4 - 1	Verizon Center	18,277	36-12-6	78
55	January 31	Tampa Bay Lightning	3 - 2	Verizon Center	18,277	37-12-6	80

February: 4-1-2 (Home: 2-0-0, Road: 2-1-2)

Game	Date	Opponent	Score	Location	Attendance	Record	Points
56	February 2	Boston Bruins	4 - 1	TD Garden	17,565	38-12-6	82
57	February 4	New York Rangers	6 - 5	Madison Square Garden	18,200	39-12-6	84
58	February 5	Atlanta Thrashers	5 - 2	Verizon Center	18,277	40-12-6	86
59	February 7	Pittsburgh Penguins	5 - 4 OT	Verizon Center	18,277	41-12-6	88
60	February 10	Montreal Canadiens	6 - 5 OT	Bell Centre	21,273	41-12-7	89
61	February 11	Ottawa Senators	6 - 5	Scotiabank Place	19,682	41-13-7	89
62	February 13	St. Louis Blues	4 - 3 SO	Scottrade Center	19,150	41-13-8	90

March: 8-2-4 (Home: 4-2-2, Road: 4-0-2)

Game	Date	Opponent	Score	Location	Attendance	Record	Points
63	March 3	Buffalo Sabres	3 - 1	HSBC Arena	18,690	42-13-8	92
64	March 4	Tampa Bay Lightning	5 - 4	Verizon Center	18,277	43-13-8	94
65	March 6	New York Rangers	2 - 0	Verizon Center	18,277	44-13-8	96
66	March 8	Dallas Stars	4 - 3 SO	Verizon Center	18,277	44-13-9	97
67	March 10	Carolina Hurricanes	4 - 3 OT	Verizon Center	18,277	45-13-9	99
68	March 12	Tampa Bay Lightning	2 - 3	Verizon Center	18,277	45-14-9	99
69	March 14	Chicago Blackhawks	4 - 3 OT	United Center	22,289	46-14-9	101
70	March 16	Florida Panthers	7 - 3	BankAtlantic Center	15,123	47-14-9	103
71	March 18	Carolina Hurricanes	3 - 4 OT	RBC Center	18,144	47-14-10	104
72	March 20	Tampa Bay Lightning	3 - 1	St. Pete Times Forum	19,844	48-14-10	106
73	March 24	Pittsburgh Penguins	4 - 3 SO	Verizon Center	18,277	49-14-10	108
74	March 25	Carolina Hurricanes	3 - 2 SO	RBC Center	18,046	49-14-11	109
75	March 28	Calgary Flames	5 - 3	Verizon Center	18,277	49-15-11	109
76	March 30	Ottawa Senators	4 - 5 OT	Verizon Center	18,277	49–15–12	110

April: 5-0-1 (Home: 3-0-1, Road: 2-0-0)

Game	Date	Opponent	Score	Location	Attendance	Record	Points
77	April 1	Atlanta Thrashers	2 - 1	Verizon Center	18,277	50-15-12	112
78	April 3	Columbus Blue Jackets	3 - 2	Nationwide Arena	16,957	51-15-12	114
79	April 5	Boston Bruins	3 - 2 OT	Verizon Center	18,277	52-15-12	116
80	April 6	Pittsburgh Penguins	6 - 3	Mellon Arena	17,132	53-15-12	118
81	April 9	Atlanta Thrashers	5 - 2	Verizon Center	18,277	54-15-12	120
82	April 11	Boston Bruins	3-4 SO	Verizon Center	18,277	54-15-13	121

== Playoffs ==
On March 11, the Capitals clinched the division title for the third consecutive season after also winning division titles in the 2007–08 and 2008–09 campaigns. The Capitals also clinched as the Eastern Conference regular season champions. On April 4, the Capitals won their first ever Presidents' Trophy award. The Capitals played the Montreal Canadiens in the opening round. The Canadiens won Game 1, 3–2 in overtime. The Capitals won the next three games to take a 3–1 series lead. The Canadiens won the next two games to tie the series at 3–3 and force a Game 7. In Game 7, the Canadiens took a 2–0 lead, which held up until the third period. The Capitals came close many times and outshot the Canadiens 42 to 16, but Canadiens goaltender Jaroslav Halak kept them in the game, only allowing one goal. The Canadiens won the game 2–1 and eliminated the Capitals in the first round. Their early post-season exit in 2010 was considered one of the biggest playoff upsets in NHL history.

Key: Win Loss Clinch Playoff Series Eliminated from playoffs

2010 Stanley Cup Playoffs

Eastern Conference Quarter-finals: vs. (8) Montreal Canadiens
#	Date	Visitor	Score	Home	OT	Decision	Attendance	Series	Recap
1	April 15	Canadiens	3 - 2	Capitals	OT	Theodore	18,377	Capitals trail 0 - 1
2	April 17	Canadiens	5 - 6	Capitals	OT	Varlamov	18,377	Series tied 1 - 1
3	April 19	Capitals	5 - 1	Canadiens		Varlamov	21,273	Capitals lead 2 - 1
4	April 21	Capitals	6 - 3	Canadiens		Varlamov	21,273	Capitals lead 3 - 1
5	April 23	Canadiens	2 - 1	Capitals		Varlamov	18,377	Capitals lead 3 - 2
6	April 26	Capitals	1 - 4	Canadiens		Varlamov	21,273	Series tied 3 - 3
7	April 28	Canadiens	2 - 1	Capitals		Varlamov	18,377	Capitals lose 3 - 4

== Player statistics ==
=== Skaters ===
Note: GP = Games played; G = Goals; A = Assists; Pts = Points; +/− = Plus/minus; PIM = Penalty minutes

Regular season

Player	GP	G	A	Pts	+/−	PIM
Alexander Ovechkin	72	50	59	109	45	89
Nicklas Backstrom	82	33	68	101	37	50
Alexander Semin	73	40	44	84	36	66
Mike Green	75	19	57	76	39	54
Brooks Laich	78	25	34	59	16	34
Mike Knuble	69	29	24	53	23	59
Tomas Fleischmann	69	23	28	51	9	28
Brendan Morrison	74	12	30	42	23	40
Eric Fehr	69	21	18	39	18	24
Tom Poti	70	4	20	24	26	42
Matt Bradley	77	10	14	24	6	47
Jeff Schultz	73	3	20	23	50	32
Jason Chimera^{†}	39	7	10	17	6	51
David Steckel	79	5	11	16	4	19
Chris Clark^{‡}	38	4	11	15	-4	27
Shaone Morrisonn	68	1	11	12	8	68
Brian Pothier^{‡}	41	4	7	11	12	10
Boyd Gordon	36	4	6	10	4	12
Mathieu Perreault	21	4	5	9	4	6
John Erskine	50	1	5	6	16	66
Tyler Sloan	40	2	4	6	-1	22
John Carlson	22	1	5	6	11	8
Eric Belanger^{†}	17	2	4	6	3	4
Joe Corvo^{†}	18	2	4	6	-4	2
Keith Aucoin	9	1	4	5	-2	0
Karl Alzner	21	0	5	5	-2	8
Quintin Laing	36	2	2	4	2	21
Milan Jurcina^{‡†}	27	0	4	4	0	14
Alexandre Giroux	9	1	2	3	3	4
Scott Walker^{†}	9	2	1	3	1	9
Kyle Wilson	2	0	2	2	1	0
Jay Beagle	7	1	1	2	-1	2
Boyd Kane	3	0	0	0	-1	2
Andrew Gordon	2	0	0	0	-2	0
Chris Bourque^{†}	1	0	0	0	-2	0

Playoffs

Player	GP	G	A	Pts	+/−	PIM
Alexander Ovechkin	7	5	5	10	5	0
Nicklas Backstrom	7	5	4	9	7	4
Mike Knuble	7	2	4	6	2	6
John Carlson	7	1	3	4	6	0
Tom Poti	6	0	4	4	9	5
Eric Fehr	7	3	1	4	2	4
Matt Bradley	7	1	2	3	2	2
Jason Chimera	7	1	2	3	2	2
Brooks Laich	7	2	1	3	-2	4
Mike Green	7	0	3	3	1	12
Joe Corvo	7	1	1	2	-2	4
Alexander Semin	7	0	2	2	0	4
Boyd Gordon	6	1	1	2	2	0
Brendan Morrison	5	0	1	1	-1	2
Eric Belanger	7	0	1	1	0	4
Tomas Fleischmann	6	0	1	1	-1	6
Jeff Schultz	7	0	1	1	-1	4
Karl Alzner	1	0	0	0	0	0
Scott Walker	1	0	0	0	0	0
Tyler Sloan	2	0	0	0	-1	0
Shaone Morrisonn	5	0	0	0	1	2
David Steckel	3	0	0	0	1	0

=== Goaltenders ===
Note: GP = Games played; Min = Time on ice (minutes); W = Wins; L = Losses; OT = Overtime losses; GA = Goals against; GAA= Goals against average; SA= Shots against; SV= Saves; Sv% = Save percentage; SO= Shutouts

Regular season

Player	GP	Min	W	L	OT	GA	GAA	SA	Sv%	SO	G	A	PIM
Jose Theodore	47	2586	30	7	7	121	2.81	1352	.911	1	0	2	0
Semyon Varlamov	26	1527	15	4	6	65	2.55	718	.909	2	0	1	0
Michal Neuvirth	17	872	9	4	0	40	2.75	464	.914	0	0	0	0

Playoffs

Player	GP	Min	W	L	GA	GAA	SA	Sv%	SO	G	A	PIM
Semyon Varlamov	6	349	3	3	14	2.41	153	.908	0	0	0	0
Jose Theodore	2	81	0	1	5	3.70	40	.875	0	0	0	0

^{†}Denotes player spent time with another team before joining Capitals. Stats reflect time with the Capitals only.
^{‡}Traded mid-season
Bold/italics denotes franchise record

== Awards and records ==
=== Awards ===
Regular Season
Player	Award	Awarded
Alexander Ovechkin	NHL First Star of the Week	October 5, 2009
Alexander Ovechkin	NHL Third Star of the Week	October 19, 2009
Alexander Ovechkin	NHL Second Star of the Month	October 2009
Nicklas Backstrom	NHL First Star of the Week	December 7, 2009
Alexander Ovechkin	NHL First Star of the Week	January 18, 2010
Alexander Ovechkin	NHL First Star of the Month	January 2010
Nicklas Backstrom	NHL Third Star of the Week	February 1, 2010
Alexander Ovechkin	NHL First Star of the Week	February 8, 2010
Nicklas Backstrom	NHL Third Star of the Week	February 8, 2010
Nicklas Backstrom	NHL Third Star of the Week	April 12, 2010
Alexander Ovechkin	Ted Lindsay Award winner	June 23, 2010
Jose Theodore	Bill Masterton Memorial Trophy winner	June 23, 2010

== Transactions ==
The Capitals have been involved in the following transactions during the 2009–10 season.

=== Trades ===
Date	Details
June 27, 2009	To Phoenix Coyotes Sami Lepisto	To Washington Capitals 5th-round pick in 2010
July 17, 2009	To Calgary Flames Keith Seabrook	To Washington Capitals Future considerations
December 28, 2009	To Columbus Blue Jackets Chris Clark; Milan Jurcina	To Washington Capitals Jason Chimera
March 3, 2010	To Carolina Hurricanes 7th-round pick in 2010	To Washington Capitals Scott Walker
March 3, 2010	To Minnesota Wild 2nd-round pick in 2010	To Washington Capitals Eric Belanger
March 3, 2010	To Columbus Blue Jackets Conditional 6th-round pick in 2010 (Note: Condition not satisfied.)	To Washington Capitals Milan Jurcina
March 3, 2010	To Carolina Hurricanes Brian Pothier; Oskar Osala; 2nd-round pick in 2011	To Washington Capitals Joe Corvo

=== Free agents acquired ===
Player	Former team	Contract terms
Jake Hauswirth	Omaha Lancers	3 years, $545,000
Mike Knuble	Philadelphia Flyers	2 years, $5.6 million
Brendan Morrison	Dallas Stars	1 year, $1.5 million
Dustin Stevenson	La Ronge Ice Wolves	3 years, entry-level contract

=== Free agents lost ===
Player	New team	Contract terms
Sergei Fedorov	Metallurg Magnitogorsk	2 years
Viktor Kozlov	Salavat Yulaev Ufa	3 years
Donald Brashear	New York Rangers	2 years, $2.8 million
Graham Mink	Florida Panthers	2 years, $525,000
Staffan Kronwall	Calgary Flames	2 years, $500,000
Brent Johnson	Pittsburgh Penguins	2 years, $2 million

=== Claimed via waivers ===
Player	Former team	Date claimed off waivers
Chris Bourque	Pittsburgh Penguins	December 5, 2009

=== Lost via waivers ===
Player	New team	Date claimed off waivers
Chris Bourque	Pittsburgh Penguins	September 30, 2009

=== Player signings ===
Player	Contract terms
Anton Gustafsson	3 years
Quintin Laing	1 year
Boyd Gordon	1 year, $761,000
Shaone Morrisonn	1 year, $1.975 million
Eric Fehr	1 year, $771,750
Chris Bourque	1 year
Kyle Wilson	1 year
Steve Pinizzotto	2 years
Jeff Schultz	1 year, $715,000
Milan Jurcina	1 year, $1.375 million
Cody Eakin	3-year entry-level contract
Alexander Semin	1 year, $6 million contract extension
Tyler Sloan	2-year contract extension
Dave Steckel	3-year contract extension
Keith Aucoin	2-year contract extension
Dmitri Kugryshev	3-year entry-level contract

== Draft picks ==
The Capitals' picks in the 2009 NHL entry draft, in Montreal, Quebec on June 26–27, 2009.

Rnd	Pick	Player	Nat	Pos	Team (league)	NHL statistics				
Rnd	Pick	Player	Nat	Pos	Team (league)	GP	G	A	Pts	PIM
1	24	Marcus Johansson	Sweden	C	Farjestad BK (Elitserien)					
2	55	Dmitry Orlov	Russia	D	Metallurg Novokuznetsk (KHL)					
3	85	Cody Eakin	Canada	C	Swift Current Broncos (WHL)					
4	115	Patrick Wey	United States	D	Waterloo Black Hawks (USHL)					
5	145	Brett Flemming	Canada	D	Mississauga St. Michael's Majors (OHL)					
6	175	Garrett Mitchell	Canada	RW	Regina Pats (WHL)					
7	205	Benjamin Casavant	Canada	LW	P.E.I. Rocket (QMJHL)					

== Farm teams ==
=== Hershey Bears ===
The Capitals' American Hockey League affiliate will remain to be the Hershey Bears in the 2009–10 season.

=== South Carolina Stingrays ===
The South Carolina Stingrays remain Washington's ECHL affiliate for the 2009–10 season.

== See also ==
- 2009–10 NHL season
