= 2009–10 Carolina Hurricanes season =

Sports season

2009–10 Carolina Hurricanes
- Division: 3rd Southeast
- Conference: 11th Eastern
- 2009–10 record: 35–37–10
- Home record: 21–17–2
- Road record: 13–20–8
- Goals for: 230
- Goals against: 256

Team information
- General manager: Jim Rutherford
- Coach: Paul Maurice
- Captain: Rod Brind'Amour (Oct.–Jan.); Eric Staal (Jan.–Apr.)
- Alternate captains: Eric Staal (Oct.–Jan.); Rod Brind'Amour (Jan.–Apr.); Ray Whitney
- Arena: RBC Center
- Average attendance: Average: 15,241 (83.9%); Total: 624,873

Team leaders
- Goals: Jussi Jokinen (30)
- Assists: Eric Staal (41)
- Points: Eric Staal (70)
- Penalty minutes: Tom Kostopoulos (106)
- Plus/minus: Andrew Alberts (+7)
- Wins: Cam Ward (18)
- Goals against average: Cam Ward (2.69)

The 2009–10 Carolina Hurricanes season was the franchise's 38th season, 31st season in the National Hockey League and 12th as the Hurricanes. Despite their great playoff run the previous year, the Hurricanes failed to make the playoffs for the first time since the 2007–08 season.

== Off-season ==
On June 15, 2009, the Carolina Hurricanes announced that they have agreed to terms with their current coaching staff. Head coach Paul Maurice was signed to a multi-year contract. The club also announced Ron Francis will return as associate head coach and take on the additional title of director of player personnel, while Tom Barrasso has been named as an assistant coach, and assistant coaches Kevin McCarthy and Tom Rowe will remain in their roles moving forward and continue on their existing multi-year contracts.

On June 26, 2009, the Hurricanes drafted Philippe Paradis as their first-round, 27th overall selection. Prior to this, the Hurricanes had not had a first-round selection outside of the top 20 since they picked Jamie McBain in the second round, 63rd overall, in the 2006 NHL entry draft.

On June 29, 2009, the Hurricanes announced that they have re-signed forward Jussi Jokinen to a two-year contract, with him earning $1.5 million in the upcoming 2009–10 season and $1.9 million in the 2010–11 season. Jokinen was acquired in a trade on February 7, 2009. He scored just one goal, but added 10 assists in 25 regular-season games, but was tied for second on the team for playoff points with 11 points (seven goals and four assists) in 18 games.

On July 24, 2009, the Carolina Hurricanes re-acquired defenceman Aaron Ward from the Boston Bruins in exchange for Patrick Eaves and a fourth-round draft pick in 2010. Ward has previously played with the club when they won the Stanley Cup back in 2006.

On July 28, 2009, the Carolina Hurricanes announced that they have bought-out the remainder of the contract for defenceman Frantisek Kaberle. Kaberle was slated to make $2.2 million during the 2009–10 season, however, with the buyout, he will now receive two-thirds ($1,467,700) of that amount over the next two seasons. Kaberle played 214 games with the club over the span of four seasons.

== Pre-season ==
2009 Pre-season Game Log: 2–2–0 (Home: 1–1–0; Road: 1–1–0)
#	Date	Visitor	Score	Home	OT	Decision	Record	Recap
1	September 18	Nashville Predators	4 – 2	Carolina Hurricanes		Cam Ward (0-1-0)	0-1-0
2	September 21	Carolina Hurricanes	2 – 4	Atlanta Thrashers		Michael Leighton (0-1-0)	0-2-0
3	September 25	Atlanta Thrashers	3 – 4	Carolina Hurricanes		Cam Ward (1-1-0)	1-2-0
4	September 26	Carolina Hurricanes	5 – 2	Nashville Predators		Michael Leighton (1-1-0)	2-2-0

== Regular season ==
The Hurricanes had the most power-play opportunities during the regular season, with 329.

=== Divisional standings ===
Southeast Division
		GP	W	L	OTL	GF	GA	Pts
**1**	**p – Washington Capitals**	**82**	**54**	**15**	**13**	**318**	**233**	**121**
2	Atlanta Thrashers	82	35	34	13	234	256	83
3	Carolina Hurricanes	82	35	37	10	230	256	80
4	Tampa Bay Lightning	82	34	36	12	217	260	80
5	Florida Panthers	82	32	37	13	208	244	77

=== Conference standings ===
Eastern Conference
R		Div	GP	W	L	OTL	GF	GA	Pts
**1**	**p – Washington Capitals**	**SE**	**82**	**54**	**15**	**13**	**318**	**233**	121
**2**	**y – New Jersey Devils**	**AT**	**82**	**48**	**27**	**7**	**222**	**191**	103
**3**	**y – Buffalo Sabres**	**NE**	**82**	**45**	**27**	**10**	**235**	**207**	100
**4**	**Pittsburgh Penguins**	**AT**	**82**	**47**	**28**	**7**	**257**	**237**	101
**5**	**Ottawa Senators**	**NE**	**82**	**44**	**32**	**6**	**225**	**238**	94
**6**	**Boston Bruins**	**NE**	**82**	**39**	**30**	**13**	**206**	**200**	91
**7**	**Philadelphia Flyers**	**AT**	**82**	**41**	**35**	**6**	**236**	**225**	88
**8**	**Montreal Canadiens**	**NE**	**82**	**39**	**33**	**10**	**217**	**223**	88
8.5
9	New York Rangers	AT	82	38	33	11	222	218	87
10	Atlanta Thrashers	SE	82	35	34	13	234	256	83
11	Carolina Hurricanes	SE	82	35	37	10	230	256	80
12	Tampa Bay Lightning	SE	82	34	36	12	217	260	80
13	New York Islanders	AT	82	34	37	11	222	264	79
14	Florida Panthers	SE	82	32	37	13	208	244	77
15	Toronto Maple Leafs	NE	82	30	38	14	214	267	74

bold – Qualified for playoffs; y – Won division; p – Won Presidents' Trophy (and division)

AT – Atlantic Division, NE – Northeast Division, SE – Southeast Division

=== Game log ===
Win (2 points) Loss (0 points) Overtime/shootout loss (1 point)

2009–10 Game Log

October: 2–7–3 (Home: 2–2–1; Road: 0–5–2)
#	**Date**	**Visitor**	**Score**	**Home**	**OT**	**Decision**	**Attendance**	**Record**	**Pts**
1	October 2	Philadelphia	2-0	Carolina Hurricanes		Ward	18,680	0-1-0	0
2	October 3	Carolina Hurricanes	2-7	Boston		Ward	16,592	0-2-0	0
3	October 6	Tampa Bay	1-2	Carolina Hurricanes	SO	Ward	16,186	1-2-0	2
4	October 9	Florida Panthers	2-7	Carolina Hurricanes		Ward	13,597	2-2-0	4
5	October 10	Carolina Hurricanes	2-5	Tampa Bay		Ward	14,212	2-3-0	4
6	October 14	Pittsburgh	3-2	Carolina Hurricanes	SO	Ward	14,053	2-3-1	5
7	October 17	Carolina Hurricanes	0-2	New Jersey		Ward	15,021	2-4-1	5
8	October 21	Carolina Hurricanes	3-4	N.Y. Islanders	SO	Ward	9,122	2-4-2	6
9	October 23	Carolina Hurricanes	4-5	Colorado Avalanche		Ward	13,673	2-5-2	6
10	October 24	Carolina Hurricanes	2-3	Minnesota Wild	OT	Ward	18,145	2-5-3	7
11	October 28	St. Louis	5-2	Carolina Hurricanes		Ward	15,549	2-6-3	7
12	October 31	Carolina Hurricanes	1-6	Philadelphia		Leighton	19,076	2-7-3	7

November: 3–10–2 (Home: 3–5–1; Road: 0–5–1)
#	**Date**	**Visitor**	**Score**	**Home**	**OT**	**Decision**	**Attendance**	**Record**	**Pts**
13	November 1	San Jose	5-1	Carolina Hurricanes		Ward	15,089	2-8-3	7
14	November 4	Carolina Hurricanes	0-3	Florida Panthers		Ward	12,424	2-9-3	7
15	November 6	Toronto	3-2	Carolina Hurricanes		Ward	14,164	2-10-3	7
16	November 7	Carolina Hurricanes	2-3	Columbus		Leighton	14,850	2-11-3	7
17	November 11	Los Angeles	5-2	Carolina Hurricanes		Legace	13,510	2-12-3	7
18	November 13	N.Y. Islanders	4-3	Carolina Hurricanes	OT	Legace	14,163	2-12-4	8
19	November 15	Minnesota Wild	4-5	Carolina Hurricanes	SO	Leighton	12,194	3-12-4	10
20	November 17	Carolina Hurricanes	2-3	Montreal	SO	Legace	21,273	3-12-5	11
21	November 19	Toronto	5-6	Carolina Hurricanes	SO	Legace	13,502	4-12-5	13
22	November 21	Tampa Bay	1-3	Carolina Hurricanes		Legace	13,224	5-12-5	15
23	November 23	Carolina Hurricanes	0-2	Dallas		Legace	16,243	5-13-5	15
24	November 25	Carolina Hurricanes	2-3	Anaheim		Legace	14,766	5-14-5	15
25	November 27	Atlanta	6-4	Carolina Hurricanes		Legace	14,463	5-15-5	15
26	November 28	Carolina Hurricanes	1-5	Buffalo		Leighton	18,690	5-16-5	15
27	November 30	Washington	3-2	Carolina Hurricanes		Leighton	12,797	5-17-5	15

December: 5–6–2 (Home: 3–3–1; Road: 2–3–1)
#	**Date**	**Visitor**	**Score**	**Home**	**OT**	**Decision**	**Attendance**	**Record**	**Pts**
28	December 5	Vancouver	3-5	Carolina Hurricanes		Legace	14,990	6-17-5	17
29	December 7	Carolina Hurricanes	3-2	Pittsburgh		Legace	16,964	7-17-5	19
30	December 9	Carolina Hurricanes	2-4	New Jersey		Ward	12,013	7-18-5	19
31	December 11	Carolina Hurricanes	3-4	Washington	OT	Ward	18,277	7-18-6	20
32	December 12	Carolina Hurricanes	2-4	Ottawa		Legace	16,229	7-19-6	20
33	December 16	Dallas	3-5	Carolina Hurricanes		Ward	13,954	8-19-6	22
34	December 18	Carolina Hurricanes	3-6	Florida Panthers		Ward	15,107	8-20-6	22
35	December 19	Florida Panthers	2-3	Carolina Hurricanes		Ward	12,758	9-20-6	24
36	December 21	N.Y. Rangers	3-1	Carolina Hurricanes		Ward	16,514	9-21-6	24
37	December 23	Montreal	5-1	Carolina Hurricanes		Ward	14,820	9-22-6	24
38	December 26	Philadelphia	4-3	Carolina Hurricanes	SO	Ward	16,288	9-22-7	25
39	December 28	Carolina Hurricanes	6-3	Washington		Ward	18,277	10-22-7	27
40	December 31	N.Y Rangers	2-1	Carolina Hurricanes		Ward	16,947	10-23-7	27

January: 8–5–1 (Home: 5–2–0; Road: 3–3–1)
#	**Date**	**Visitor**	**Score**	**Home**	**OT**	**Decision**	**Attendance**	**Record**	**Pts**
41	January 2	Carolina Hurricanes	2-1	N.Y. Rangers	OT	Ward	18,200	11-23-7	29
42	January 7	Carolina Hurricanes	2-4	Nashville		Ward	14,910	11-24-7	29
43	January 8	Colorado Avalanche	1-2	Carolina Hurricanes		Ward	14,071	12-24-7	31
44	January 10	Ottawa	1-4	Carolina Hurricanes		Ward	16,892	13-24-7	33
45	January 12	Carolina Hurricanes	4-2	Toronto		Ward	19,120	14-24-7	35
46	January 14	Carolina Hurricanes	1-3	Detroit		Ward	20,066	14-25-7	35
47	January 16	Atlanta	5-3	Carolina Hurricanes		Ward	14,812	14-26-7	35
48	January 18	Tampa Bay	3-2	Carolina Hurricanes		Ward	16,031	14-27-7	35
49	January 21	Carolina Hurricanes	5-2	Atlanta		Ward	10,472	15-27-7	37
50	January 23	Carolina Hurricanes	2-4	Philadelphia		Ward	19,732	15-28-7	37
51	January 24	Boston	1-5	Carolina Hurricanes		Ward	13,512	16-28-7	39
52	January 27	Carolina Hurricanes	5-1	N.Y. Rangers		Ward	18,200	17-28-7	41
53	January 28	N.Y. Islanders	1-4	Carolina Hurricanes		Ward	15,473	18-28-7	43
54	January 30	Chicago	2-4	Carolina Hurricanes		Ward	6,896	19-28-7	45

February: 5–2–0 (Home: 3–0–0; Road: 2–2–0)
#	**Date**	**Visitor**	**Score**	**Home**	**OT**	**Decision**	**Attendance**	**Record**	**Pts**
55	February 1	Carolina Hurricanes	2-4	Edmonton		Ward	16,839	19-29-7	45
56	February 3	Carolina Hurricanes	1-4	Calgary		Ward	19,289	19-30-7	45
57	February 5	Carolina Hurricanes	4-3	Buffalo		Legace	18,690	20-30-7	47
58	February 6	Carolina Hurricanes	3-1	N.Y. Islanders		Peters	12,709	21-30-7	49
59	February 9	Nashville	1-4	Carolina Hurricanes		Legace	18,393	22-30-7	51
60	February 11	Buffalo	3-4	Carolina Hurricanes	OT	Legace	15,527	23-30-7	53
61	February 13	New Jersey	2-4	Carolina Hurricanes		Peters	16,466	24-30-7	55

March: 9–5–2 (Home: 4–4–0; Road: 5–1–2)
#	**Date**	**Visitor**	**Score**	**Home**	**OT**	**Decision**	**Attendance**	**Record**	**Pts**
62	March 2	Carolina Hurricanes	5-1	Toronto		Peters	19,096	25-30-7	57
63	March 4	Ottawa	1-4	Carolina Hurricanes		Legace	17,048	26-30-7	59
64	March 6	Carolina Hurricanes	1-4	Florida Panthers		Peters	16,202	26-31-7	59
65	March 7	Carolina Hurricanes	4-0	Atlanta		Legace	15,306	27-31-7	61
66	March 10	Carolina Hurricanes	3-4	Washington	OT	Legace	18,277	27-31-8	62
67	March 11	Pittsburgh	3-4	Carolina Hurricanes	OT	Peters	16,426	28-31-8	64
68	March 13	Phoenix	4-0	Carolina Hurricanes		Peters	17,690	28-32-8	64
69	March 16	Boston	5-2	Carolina Hurricanes		Legace	15,832	28-33-8	64
70	March 18	Washington	3-4	Carolina Hurricanes	OT	Peters	18,144	29-33-8	66
71	March 20	Carolina Hurricanes	3-2	Pittsburgh	OT	Peters	17,090	30-33-8	68
72	March 21	Buffalo	5-3	Carolina Hurricanes		Peters	15,311	30-34-8	68
73	March 23	Carolina Hurricanes	2-3	Tampa Bay	OT	Legace	13,009	30-34-9	69
74	March 25	Washington	2-3	Carolina Hurricanes	SO	Legace	18,046	31-34-9	71
75	March 27	Atlanta	4-0	Carolina Hurricanes		Legace	16,108	31-35-9	71
76	March 29	Carolina Hurricanes	4-1	Atlanta		Ward	13,440	32-35-9	73
77	March 31	Carolina Hurricanes	2-1	Montreal		Ward	21,273	33-35-9	75

April: 2–2–1 (Home: 1–1–0; Road: 1–1–1)
#	**Date**	**Visitor**	**Score**	**Home**	**OT**	**Decision**	**Attendance**	**Record**	**Pts**
78	April 1	Carolina Hurricanes	3-4	Ottawa	SO	Legace	19,152	33-36-10	76
79	April 3	New Jersey	4-0	Carolina Hurricanes		Ward	16,073	33-36-10	76
80	April 6	Carolina Hurricanes	8-5	Tampa Bay		Ward	12,454	34-36-10	78
81	April 8	Montreal	2-5	Carolina Hurricanes		Ward	18,680	35-36-10	80
82	April 10	Carolina Hurricanes	2-4	Boston		Ward	17,565	35-37-10	80

== Player statistics ==
=== Skaters ===
Note: GP = Games played; G = Goals; A = Assists; Pts = Points; +/− = Plus/minus; PIM = Penalty minutes

Regular season

Player	GP	G	A	Pts	+/−	PIM
Eric Staal	70	29	41	70	4	68
Jussi Jokinen	81	30	35	65	3	36
Ray Whitney	80	21	37	58	-6	26
Joni Pitkanen	71	6	40	46	-11	72
Brandon Sutter	72	21	19	40	-1	2
Matt Cullen^{‡}	60	12	28	40	0	26
Tuomo Ruutu	54	14	21	35	-4	50
Sergei Samsonov	72	14	15	29	-15	32
Chad LaRose	56	11	17	28	-2	24
Tom Kostopoulos	82	8	13	21	4	106
Rod Brind'Amour	80	9	10	19	-29	36
Tim Gleason	61	5	14	19	0	78
Erik Cole	40	11	5	16	-9	29
Patrick Dwyer	58	7	5	12	-3	6
Brett Carson	54	2	10	12	5	12
Joe Corvo^{‡}	34	4	8	12	-6	10
Bryan Rodney	22	1	10	11	-4	8
Aaron Ward^{‡}	60	1	10	11	-17	54
Jamie McBain	14	3	7	10	6	0
Andrew Alberts^{‡}	62	2	8	10	7	74
Zach Boychuk	31	3	6	9	1	2
Stephane Yelle^{‡}	59	4	3	7	-6	28
Jay Harrison	38	1	5	6	-8	50
Jiri Tlusty^{†}	18	1	5	6	2	6
Scott Walker^{‡}	33	3	2	5	-4	23
Niclas Wallin^{‡}	47	0	5	5	-5	26
Brian Pothier^{†}	20	1	3	4	-8	11
Drayson Bowman	9	2	0	2	-1	4
Jerome Samson	7	0	2	2	-1	10
Steven Goertzen	6	0	0	0	-2	5
Tim Conboy	12	0	0	0	-5	24
Casey Borer	2	0	0	0	-1	0
Oskar Osala	1	0	0	0	0	0
Alexandre Picard^{†}	9	0	0	0	2	6

=== Goaltenders ===
Note: GP = Games played; TOI = Time on ice (minutes); W = Wins; L = Losses; OT = Overtime losses; GA = Goals against; GAA= Goals against average; SA= Shots against; SV= Saves; Sv% = Save percentage; SO= Shutouts

Regular season

Player	GP	TOI	W	L	OT	GA	GAA	SA	Sv%	SO	G	A	PIM
Cam Ward	47	2651	18	23	5	119	2.69	1409	.916	0	0	3	0
Manny Legace	28	1472	10	7	5	69	2.81	745	.907	1	0	1	0
Justin Peters	9	488	6	3	0	23	2.83	241	.905	0	0	0	0
Michael Leighton^{‡}	7	350	1	4	0	25	4.28	164	.848	0	0	0	0

^{†}Denotes player spent time with another team before joining Hurricanes. Stats reflect time with Hurricanes only.
^{‡}Traded mid-season
Bold/italics denotes franchise record

== Awards ==
Regular Season
Player	Award	Awarded
Eric Staal	NHL Second Star of the Week	April 12, 2010

== Transactions ==
The Hurricanes have been involved in the following transactions during the 2009–10 season.

=== Trades ===
Date	Details
July 24, 2009	To Boston Bruins Patrick Eaves; 4th-round pick in 2010	To Carolina Hurricanes Aaron Ward
August 31, 2009	To New York Islanders Bobby Hughes	To Carolina Hurricanes Rob Hennigar
December 3, 2009	To Toronto Maple Leafs Philippe Paradis	To Carolina Hurricanes Jiri Tlusty
February 7, 2010	To San Jose Sharks Niclas Wallin; 5th-round pick in 2010	To Carolina Hurricanes 2nd-round pick in 2010
February 12, 2010	To Ottawa Senators Matt Cullen	To Carolina Hurricanes Alexandre Picard; 2nd-round pick in 2010
March 3, 2010	To Anaheim Ducks Aaron Ward	To Carolina Hurricanes Justin Pogge; Conditional 4th-round pick in 2010 (Note: Condition satisfied.)
March 3, 2010	To Washington Capitals Scott Walker	To Carolina Hurricanes 7th-round pick in 2010
March 3, 2010	To Washington Capitals Joe Corvo	To Carolina Hurricanes Brian Pothier; Oskar Osala; 2nd-round pick in 2011
March 3, 2010	To Colorado Avalanche Stephane Yelle; Harrison Reed	To Carolina Hurricanes Cedric McNicoll; 6th-round pick in 2010
March 3, 2010	To Vancouver Canucks Andrew Alberts	To Carolina Hurricanes 3rd-round pick in 2010

=== Free agents acquired ===
Player	Former team	Contract terms
Matthew Pistilli	Shawinigan Cataractes	3 years, $1.524 million two-way contract
Steven Goertzen	Phoenix Coyotes	1 year, $500,000 two-way contract
Jay Harrison	Toronto Maple Leafs	1 year, $500,000 two-way contract
Tom Kostopoulos	Montreal Canadiens	3 years, $2.75 million
Zack Fitzgerald	Manitoba Moose	1 year, two-way contract
Andrew Alberts	Philadelphia Flyers	2 years, $2.1 million
Stephane Yelle	Boston Bruins	1 year, $550,000
Manny Legace	St. Louis Blues	1 year, $500,000

=== Free agents lost ===
Player	New team	Contract terms
Dwight Helminen	San Jose Sharks	1 year
Frantisek Kaberle		Remaining contract bought out
Wade Brookbank	Pittsburgh Penguins	undisclosed
Dennis Seidenberg	Florida Panthers	1 year, $2.25 million
Anton Babchuk	Avangard Omsk	1 year, $1.5 million
Ryan Bayda	Pittsburgh Penguins	1 year

=== Claimed via waivers ===
Player	Former team	Date claimed off waivers

=== Lost via waivers ===
Player	New team	Date claimed off waivers
Michael Leighton	Philadelphia Flyers	December 15, 2009

=== Player signings ===
Player	Contract terms
Chris Terry	3 years, two-way contract
Jussi Jokinen	2 years, $3.4 million
Erik Cole	2 years, $5.8 million
Patrick Dwyer	2 years, two-way contract
Michael Ryan	1 year, two-way contract
Chad LaRose	2 years, $3.4 million
Casey Borer	1 year, two-way contract
Justin Peters	1 year, two-way contract
Mike Angelidis	1 year, two-way contract
Brett Carson	1 year, two-way contract
Bryan Rodney	1 year, two-way contract
Tuomo Ruutu	3 years, $11.4 million
Cam Ward	6 years, $37.8 million contract extension
Kyle Lawson	2 years, $1.025 million entry-level contract
Zac Dalpe	3 years, $1.85 million entry-level contract
Michal Jordan	3 years, $1.65 million entry-level contract
Jared Staal	3 years, $1.55 million entry-level contract

== Draft picks ==
The 2009 NHL entry draft was in Montreal, Quebec.

Round	#	Player	Position	Nationality	College/Junior/Club team (League)
1	27	Philippe Paradis	(C)	Canada	Shawinigan Cataractes (QMJHL)
2	51 (from Calgary via Los Angeles)	Brian Dumoulin	(D)	United States	New Hampshire Junior Monarchs (EJHL)
3	88	Mattias Lindstrom	(LW)	Sweden	Skelleftea AIK (J20 SuperElit)
5	131 (from Edmonton)	Matt Kennedy	(RW)	Canada	Guelph Storm (OHL)
6	178	Rasmus Rissanen	(D)	Finland	KalPa Jr. (Jr. A SM-liiga)
7	208	Tommi Kivisto	(D)	Finland	Red Deer Rebels (WHL)

== Farm teams ==
=== American Hockey League ===
The Albany River Rats are the Hurricanes American Hockey League affiliate for the 2009–10 AHL season.

=== ECHL ===
The Florida Everblades are the Hurricanes ECHL affiliate.
