= 2009–10 Tampa Bay Lightning season =

National Hockey League team season

2009–10 Tampa Bay Lightning
- Division: 4th Southeast
- Conference: 12th Eastern
- 2009–10 record: 34–36–12
- Home record: 21–14–6
- Road record: 13–22–6
- Goals for: 217
- Goals against: 260

Team information
- General manager: Brian Lawton
- Coach: Rick Tocchet
- Captain: Vincent Lecavalier
- Alternate captains: Mattias Ohlund; Martin St. Louis
- Arena: St. Pete Times Forum
- Average attendance: 15,497 (78.4%)

Team leaders
- Goals: Steven Stamkos (51)
- Assists: Martin St. Louis (65)
- Points: Steven Stamkos (95)
- Penalty minutes: Zenon Konopka (265)
- Plus/minus: Steve Downie (+14)
- Wins: Antero Niittymaki (21)
- Goals against average: Antero Niittymaki (2.87)

The 2009–10 Tampa Bay Lightning season was the 18th season for the National Hockey League (NHL) team. Unlike the previous off-season, the Lightning did not make many roster changes. Second-year winger Steve Stamkos emerged from obscurity in which would turn out to be a breakout season that saw him score 10 goals in his first 11 games. Through the months of January and February, Stamkos had an 18-game point streak and he was ranked in the top five in the NHL in scoring by the time he turned 20, challenging the likes of established NHL superstars such as Alexander Ovechkin and Sidney Crosby. On April 10, 2010, Stamkos reached the 50-goal mark for the first time in his career when he scored two goals against the Florida Panthers. He ended the season with 51 goals, tied for most in the NHL with Sidney Crosby of the Pittsburgh Penguins, with the two sharing the Rocket Richard Trophy as the NHL's goal-scoring leaders. He tied Crosby in the final minute of the last game of the season with an empty-net goal while also becoming the third-youngest player in NHL history to score 50 goals in a season, after Wayne Gretzky and Jimmy Carson. Despite Stamkos's individual successes, the team's poor seasonal record prompted team owner Jeffrey Vinik to terminate Brian Lawton and Rick Tocchet's contracts as general manager and head coach, respectively.

The Lightning improved on their regular season record but failed to qualify for the Stanley Cup playoffs for the third season in a row for the first time since the 1999–00 season and the 2001–02 season. The team was sold during the season to Boston-based investor Jeff Vinik. After the season, Vinik fired the Lightning's management team.

== Off-season ==
On May 11, the Lightning gave Rick Tocchet a multi-year contract to make him their full-time head coach, removing the interim tag he held after taking over the position from Barry Melrose, who was fired during the previous season after 16 games.

On June 23, NHL Commissioner Gary Bettman met with Lightning co-owners Oren Koules and Len Barrie due to philosophical and financial differences over how to build the team. More details were not available to the public because Bettman imposed a "gag-order" over the meetings. By February, the team was sold and both Koules and Barrie were no longer involved. It was also in this time period that Bettman reportedly vetoed a trade between the Lightning and the Montreal Canadiens that would have sent center Vincent Lecavalier to the Canadiens in exchange for goaltender Carey Price, center Tomas Plekanec and an unnamed prospect.

With the second overall pick in the Entry Draft, the Lightning selected defenseman Victor Hedman from Modo Hockey of the Elitserien. Hedman was considered the top European prospect available. Having acquired a second first-round pick from the Detroit Red Wings, the Lightning used the 29th overall selection on Carter Ashton from the Lethbridge Hurricanes of the Western Hockey League (WHL).

Among several of the free agent signings the Lightning made included defenseman Mattias Ohlund, goaltender Antero Niittymaki and veteran left winger Alex Tanguay.

== Preseason ==
2009 Pre-season Game Log: 3–1–3 (Home: 0–0–0; Road: 1–0–2; Neutral: 2–1–1)

| # | Date | Visitor | Score | Home | OT | Attendance | Record | Recap |
|---|---|---|---|---|---|---|---|---|
| 1 | September 16 | Tampa Bay Lightning | 4 – 3 | Dallas Stars | SO | 15,214 | 0–0–1 | |
| 2 | September 18 | Atlanta Thrashers | 2 – 1 | Tampa Bay Lightning | OT | 16,223 | 0–0–2 | |
| 3 | September 21 (in Regina, SK) | Ottawa Senators | 3 – 1 | Tampa Bay Lightning | | | 0–1–2 | |
| 4 | September 22 (in Everett, Washington) | Phoenix Coyotes | 2 – 1 | Tampa Bay Lightning | | | 1–1–2 | |
| 5 | September 23 (in Loveland, Colorado) | Tampa Bay Lightning | 4 – 3 | Phoenix Coyotes | SO | | 1–1–3 | |
| 6 | September 24 (in Winnipeg, MB) | Edmonton Oilers | 4 – 3 | Tampa Bay Lightning | OT | | 2–1–3 | |
| 7 | September 27 | Tampa Bay Lightning | 5 – 1 | Atlanta Thrashers | | 7,179 | 3–1–3 | |

== Regular season ==
The Lightning ended the regular season having scored the fewest shorthanded goals in the League, with just 2.

After the regular season finished with Tampa Bay missing the playoffs, the Lightning fired both General Manager Brian Lawton and Head Coach Rick Tocchet on April 12, 2010.

For the third consecutive year, the Lightning failed to qualify for the playoffs.

=== Divisional standings ===
Southeast Division
| | | GP | W | L | OTL | GF | GA | Pts |
|---|---|---|---|---|---|---|---|---|
| **1** | **p – Washington Capitals** | **82** | **54** | **15** | **13** | **318** | **233** | **121** |
| 2 | Atlanta Thrashers | 82 | 35 | 34 | 13 | 234 | 256 | 83 |
| 3 | Carolina Hurricanes | 82 | 35 | 37 | 10 | 230 | 256 | 80 |
| 4 | Tampa Bay Lightning | 82 | 34 | 36 | 12 | 217 | 260 | 80 |
| 5 | Florida Panthers | 82 | 32 | 37 | 13 | 208 | 244 | 77 |

=== Conference standings ===
Eastern Conference
| R | | Div | GP | W | L | OTL | GF | GA | Pts |
|---|---|---|---|---|---|---|---|---|---|
| **1** | **p – Washington Capitals** | **SE** | **82** | **54** | **15** | **13** | **318** | **233** | 121 |
| **2** | **y – New Jersey Devils** | **AT** | **82** | **48** | **27** | **7** | **222** | **191** | 103 |
| **3** | **y – Buffalo Sabres** | **NE** | **82** | **45** | **27** | **10** | **235** | **207** | 100 |
| **4** | **Pittsburgh Penguins** | **AT** | **82** | **47** | **28** | **7** | **257** | **237** | 101 |
| **5** | **Ottawa Senators** | **NE** | **82** | **44** | **32** | **6** | **225** | **238** | 94 |
| **6** | **Boston Bruins** | **NE** | **82** | **39** | **30** | **13** | **206** | **200** | 91 |
| **7** | **Philadelphia Flyers** | **AT** | **82** | **41** | **35** | **6** | **236** | **225** | 88 |
| **8** | **Montreal Canadiens** | **NE** | **82** | **39** | **33** | **10** | **217** | **223** | 88 |
8.5
| 9 | New York Rangers | AT | 82 | 38 | 33 | 11 | 222 | 218 | 87 |
| 10 | Atlanta Thrashers | SE | 82 | 35 | 34 | 13 | 234 | 256 | 83 |
| 11 | Carolina Hurricanes | SE | 82 | 35 | 37 | 10 | 230 | 256 | 80 |
| 12 | Tampa Bay Lightning | SE | 82 | 34 | 36 | 12 | 217 | 260 | 80 |
| 13 | New York Islanders | AT | 82 | 34 | 37 | 11 | 222 | 264 | 79 |
| 14 | Florida Panthers | SE | 82 | 32 | 37 | 13 | 208 | 244 | 77 |
| 15 | Toronto Maple Leafs | NE | 82 | 30 | 38 | 14 | 214 | 267 | 74 |

bold – Qualified for playoffs; y – Won division; p – Won Presidents' Trophy (and division)

AT – Atlantic Division, NE – Northeast Division, SE – Southeast Division

=== Game log ===
2009–10 Game Log
October: 4–3–4 (Home: 4–0–3; Road 0–3–1)

| Game | Date | Opponent | Score | Location | Attendance | Record | Points |
|---|---|---|---|---|---|---|---|
| 1 | October 3 | Atlanta Thrashers | 6 – 3 | Philips Arena | 18,545 | 0–1–0 | 0 |
| 2 | October 6 | Carolina Hurricanes | 2 – 1 (SO) | RBC Center | 16,186 | 0–1–1 | 1 |
| 3 | October 8 | New Jersey Devils | 4 – 3 (SO) | St. Pete Times Forum | 17,454 | 0–1–2 | 2 |
| 4 | October 10 | Carolina Hurricanes | 5 – 2 | St. Pete Times Forum | 14,212 | 1–1–2 | 4 |
| 5 | October 12 | Florida Panthers | 3 – 2 | St. Pete Times Forum | 14,126 | 2–1–2 | 6 |
| 6 | October 15 | Ottawa Senators | 7 – 1 | Scotiabank Place | 17,732 | 2–2–2 | 6 |
| 7 | October 17 | Pittsburgh Penguins | 4 – 1 | Mellon Arena | 17,132 | 2–3–2 | 6 |
| 8 | October 22 | San Jose Sharks | 5 – 2 | St. Pete Times Forum | 13,343 | 3–3–2 | 8 |
| 9 | October 24 | Buffalo Sabres | 3 – 2 (SO) | St. Pete Times Forum | 15,804 | 3–3–3 | 9 |
| 10 | October 29 | Ottawa Senators | 5 – 2 | St. Pete Times Forum | 13,213 | 4–3–3 | 11 |
| 11 | October 31 | New Jersey Devils | 2 – 1 (SO) | St. Pete Times Forum | 12,154 | 4–3–4 | 12 |

November: 6–4–4 (Home: 2–2–1; Road 4–2–3)

| Game | Date | Opponent | Score | Location | Attendance | Record | Points |
|---|---|---|---|---|---|---|---|
| 12 | November 2 | Philadelphia Flyers | 6 – 2 | Wachovia Center | 18,667 | 4–4–4 | 12 |
| 13 | November 3 | Toronto Maple Leafs | 2 – 1 (OT) | Air Canada Centre | 19,301 | 5–4–4 | 14 |
| 14 | November 5 | Ottawa Senators | 3 – 2 (OT) | Scotiabank Place | 17,511 | 5–4–5 | 15 |
| 15 | November 7 | Montreal Canadiens | 3 – 1 | Bell Centre | 21,273 | 6–4–5 | 17 |
| 16 | November 12 | Minnesota Wild | 4 – 3 (SO) | St. Pete Times Forum | 14,530 | 7–4–5 | 19 |
| 17 | November 14 | Los Angeles Kings | 2 – 1 (SO) | St. Pete Times Forum | 16,612 | 7–4–6 | 20 |
| 18 | November 16 | Phoenix Coyotes | 4 – 1 | Jobing.com Arena | 9,503 | 8–4–6 | 22 |
| 19 | November 19 | Anaheim Ducks | 4 – 3 (OT) | Honda Center | 14,555 | 8–4–7 | 23 |
| 20 | November 21 | Carolina Hurricanes | 3 – 1 | RBC Center | 13,224 | 8–5–7 | 23 |
| 21 | November 22 | Atlanta Thrashers | 4 – 3 (OT) | Philips Arena | 13,342 | 9–5–7 | 25 |
| 22 | November 25 | Toronto Maple Leafs | 4 – 3 | St. Pete Times Forum | 15,333 | 9–6–7 | 25 |
| 23 | November 27 | New York Rangers | 5 – 1 | St. Pete Times Forum | 17,608 | 10–6–7 | 27 |
| 24 | November 28 | Dallas Stars | 4 – 3 (OT) | American Airlines Center | 17,334 | 10–6–8 | 28 |
| 25 | November 30 | Colorado Avalanche | 3 – 0 | St. Pete Times Forum | 12,214 | 10–7–8 | 28 |

December: 5–8–2 (Home: 3–3–1; Road 2–5–1)

| Game | Date | Opponent | Score | Location | Attendance | Record | Points |
|---|---|---|---|---|---|---|---|
| 26 | December 2 | Boston Bruins | 4 – 1 | TD Garden | 16,533 | 10–8–8 | 28 |
| 27 | December 4 | New Jersey Devils | 3 – 2 | Prudential Center | 15,336 | 10–9–8 | 28 |
| 28 | December 5 | New York Islanders | 4 – 0 | St. Pete Times Forum | 13,577 | 11–9–8 | 30 |
| 29 | December 7 | Washington Capitals | 3 – 0 | St. Pete Times Forum | 12,400 | 11–10–8 | 30 |
| 30 | December 9 | Edmonton Oilers | 3 – 2 | St. Pete Times Forum | 13,477 | 11–11–8 | 30 |
| 31 | December 11 | Colorado Avalanche | 2 – 1 (SO) | Pepsi Center | 12,188 | 11–11–9 | 31 |
| 32 | December 13 | Chicago Blackhawks | 4 – 0 | United Center | 21,081 | 11–12–9 | 31 |
| 33 | December 15 | Nashville Predators | 7 – 4 | Sommet Center | 15,804 | 11–13–9 | 31 |
| 34 | December 17 | Detroit Red Wings | 3 – 0 | Joe Louis Arena | 19,474 | 11–14–9 | 31 |
| 35 | December 18 | St. Louis Blues | 6 – 3 | Scottrade Center | 19,150 | 12–14–9 | 33 |
| 36 | December 21 | New York Islanders | 4 – 2 | Nassau Veterans Memorial Coliseum | 10,864 | 13–14–9 | 35 |
| 37 | December 23 | Philadelphia Flyers | 5 – 2 | St. Pete Times Forum | 16,177 | 13–15–9 | 35 |
| 38 | December 26 | Atlanta Thrashers | 4 – 3 | St. Pete Times Forum | 15,437 | 14–15–9 | 37 |
| 39 | December 28 | Boston Bruins | 2 – 1 | St. Pete Times Forum | 16,926 | 15–15–9 | 39 |
| 40 | December 30 | Montreal Canadiens | 2 – 1 (OT) | St. Pete Times Forum | 18,441 | 15–15–10 | 40 |

January: 7–6–1 (Home: 5–1–1; Road 2–5–0)

| Game | Date | Opponent | Score | Location | Attendance | Record | Points |
|---|---|---|---|---|---|---|---|
| 41 | January 2 | Pittsburgh Penguins | 3 – 1 | St. Pete Times Forum | 20,109 | 16–15–10 | 42 |
| 42 | January 6 | Buffalo Sabres | 5 – 3 | HSBC Arena | 18,690 | 16–16–10 | 42 |
| 44 | January 8* | New Jersey Devils | 4 – 2 | Prudential Center | 15,129 | 17–16–10 | 44 |
| 43 | January 9 | Philadelphia Flyers | 4 – 1 | Wachovia Center | 19,678 | 16–17–10 | 44 |
| 45 | January 12 | Washington Capitals | 7 – 4 | St. Pete Times Forum | 13,891 | 18–17–10 | 46 |
| 46 | January 14 | Florida Panthers | 3 – 2 | St. Pete Times Forum | 13,516 | 18–18–10 | 46 |
| 47 | January 16 | Florida Panthers | 5 – 2 | BankAtlantic Center | 15,971 | 18–19–10 | 46 |
| 48 | January 18 | Carolina Hurricanes | 3 – 2 | RBC Center | 16,031 | 19–19–10 | 48 |
| 49 | January 19 | New York Rangers | 8 – 2 | Madison Square Garden | 18,200 | 19–20–10 | 48 |
| 50 | January 21 | Toronto Maple Leafs | 3 – 2 (OT) | St. Pete Times Forum | 13,691 | 20–20–10 | 50 |
| 51 | January 23 | Atlanta Thrashers | 2 – 1 (SO) | St. Pete Times Forum | 16,212 | 21–20–10 | 52 |
| 52 | January 27 | Montreal Canadiens | 3 – 0 | St. Pete Times Forum | 14,404 | 22–20–10 | 54 |
| 53 | January 29 | Anaheim Ducks | 2 – 1 (SO) | St. Pete Times Forum | 15,230 | 22–20–11 | 55 |
| 54 | January 31 | Washington Capitals | 3 – 2 | Verizon Center | 18,277 | 22–21–11 | 55 |
*Originally scheduled for January 8, but suspended during the 2nd period due to a lighting failure. Play resumed on January 10 from the moment it was stopped.

February: 4–3–0 (Home: 3–1–0; Road 1–2–0)

| Game | Date | Opponent | Score | Location | Attendance | Record | Points |
|---|---|---|---|---|---|---|---|
| 55 | February 2 | Atlanta Thrashers | 2 – 1 | Philips Arena | 11,390 | 23–21–11 | 57 |
| 56 | February 4 | New York Islanders | 5 – 2 | St. Pete Times Forum | 13,891 | 24–21–11 | 59 |
| 57 | February 6 | Calgary Flames | 2 – 1 (OT) | St. Pete Times Forum | 15,859 | 25–21–11 | 61 |
| 58 | February 9 | Vancouver Canucks | 3 – 1 | St. Pete Times Forum | 14,226 | 26–21–11 | 63 |
| 59 | February 11 | Boston Bruins | 5 – 4 | St. Pete Times Forum | 15,826 | 26–22–11 | 63 |
| 60 | February 13 | New York Islanders | 5 – 4 | Nassau Veterans Memorial Coliseum | 12,337 | 26–23–11 | 63 |
| 61 | February 14 | New York Rangers | 5 – 2 | Madison Square Garden | 18,200 | 26–24–11 | 63 |
League-wide break for 2010 Winter Olympics (February 15–28)

March: 5–10–1 (Home: 2–5–0; Road 3–5–1)

| Game | Date | Opponent | Score | Location | Attendance | Record | Points |
|---|---|---|---|---|---|---|---|
| 62 | March 2 | Philadelphia Flyers | 7 – 2 | St. Pete Times Forum | 17,812 | 26–25–11 | 63 |
| 63 | March 4 | Washington Capitals | 5 – 4 | Verizon Center | 18,277 | 26–26–11 | 63 |
| 64 | March 6 | Atlanta Thrashers | 6 – 2 | St. Pete Times Forum | 19,926 | 27–26–11 | 65 |
| 65 | March 9 | Montreal Canadiens | 5 – 3 | Bell Centre | 21,273 | 27–27–11 | 65 |
| 66 | March 11 | Toronto Maple Leafs | 4 – 3 (OT) | Air Canada Centre | 19,110 | 27–27–12 | 66 |
| 67 | March 12 | Washington Capitals | 3 – 2 | Verizon Center | 18,277 | 28–27–12 | 68 |
| 68 | March 14 | Pittsburgh Penguins | 2 – 1 | St. Pete Times Forum | 20,230 | 28–28–12 | 68 |
| 69 | March 16 | Phoenix Coyotes | 2 – 1 | St. Pete Times Forum | 14,517 | 28–29–12 | 68 |
| 70 | March 18 | Buffalo Sabres | 6 – 2 | St. Pete Times Forum | 16,868 | 28–30–12 | 68 |
| 71 | March 20 | Washington Capitals | 3 – 1 | St. Pete Times Forum | 19,844 | 28–31–12 | 68 |
| 72 | March 21 | Florida Panthers | 5 – 2 | BankAtlantic Center | 14,831 | 28–32–12 | 68 |
| 73 | March 23 | Carolina Hurricanes | 3 – 2 (OT) | St. Pete Times Forum | 13,009 | 29–32–12 | 70 |
| 74 | March 25 | Boston Bruins | 5 – 3 | TD Garden | 17,565 | 30–32–12 | 72 |
| 75 | March 27 | Buffalo Sabres | 7 – 1 | HSBC Arena | 18,690 | 30–33–12 | 72 |
| 76 | March 30 | Columbus Blue Jackets | 3 – 2 | Nationwide Arena | 15,760 | 30–34–12 | 72 |
| 77 | March 31 | Pittsburgh Penguins | 2 – 0 | Mellon Arena | 17,132 | 31–34–12 | 74 |

April: 3–2–0 (Home: 2–2–0; Road 1–0–0)

| Game | Date | Opponent | Score | Location | Attendance | Record | Points |
|---|---|---|---|---|---|---|---|
| 78 | April 2 | New York Rangers | 5 – 0 | St. Pete Times Forum | 17,909 | 31–35–12 | 74 |
| 79 | April 6 | Carolina Hurricanes | 8 – 5 | St. Pete Times Forum | 12,454 | 31–36–12 | 74 |
| 80 | April 8 | Ottawa Senators | 4 – 3 (SO) | St. Pete Times Forum | 15,876 | 32–36–12 | 76 |
| 81 | April 10 | Florida Panthers | 4 – 3 (SO) | St. Pete Times Forum | 17,050 | 33–36–12 | 78 |
| 82 | April 11 | Florida Panthers | 3 – 1 | BankAtlantic Center | 15,884 | 34–36–12 | 80 |

Schedule

Win Loss Overtime/Shootout Loss

== Player stats ==
=== Skaters ===
Note: GP = Games played; G = Goals; A = Assists; Pts = Points; +/− = Plus/minus; PIM = Penalty minutes

| Player | GP | G | A | Pts | +/− | PIM |
|---|---|---|---|---|---|---|
| Steven Stamkos | 82 | 51 | 44 | 95 | -2 | 38 |
| Martin St. Louis | 82 | 29 | 65 | 94 | -8 | 12 |
| Vincent Lecavalier | 82 | 24 | 46 | 70 | -16 | 63 |
| Ryan Malone | 69 | 21 | 26 | 47 | -8 | 68 |
| Steve Downie | 79 | 22 | 24 | 46 | 14 | 208 |
| Kurtis Foster | 71 | 8 | 34 | 42 | -5 | 48 |
| Alex Tanguay | 80 | 10 | 27 | 37 | -2 | 32 |
| Victor Hedman | 74 | 4 | 16 | 20 | -3 | 79 |
| Andrej Meszaros | 81 | 6 | 11 | 17 | -14 | 50 |
| Jeff Halpern^{‡} | 55 | 9 | 8 | 17 | -13 | 27 |
| Mattias Ohlund | 67 | 0 | 13 | 13 | -8 | 59 |
| Brandon Bochenski | 28 | 4 | 9 | 13 | -1 | 2 |
| Mike Lundin | 49 | 3 | 10 | 13 | -4 | 18 |
| Stephane Veilleux | 77 | 3 | 6 | 9 | -14 | 48 |
| Teddy Purcell^{†} | 19 | 3 | 6 | 9 | -8 | 6 |
| Paul Szczechura | 52 | 5 | 2 | 7 | -15 | 18 |
| Todd Fedoruk | 50 | 3 | 3 | 6 | -12 | 54 |
| James Wright | 48 | 2 | 3 | 5 | -9 | 18 |
| Matt Walker | 66 | 2 | 3 | 5 | -11 | 90 |
| Zenon Konopka | 74 | 2 | 3 | 5 | -11 | 265 |
| David Hale | 39 | 0 | 4 | 4 | -2 | 25 |
| Nate Thompson^{†} | 32 | 1 | 3 | 4 | -3 | 17 |
| Mark Parrish | 16 | 0 | 2 | 2 | -5 | 4 |
| Paul Ranger | 8 | 1 | 1 | 2 | -2 | 6 |
| Matt Smaby | 33 | 0 | 2 | 2 | -4 | 27 |
| Lukas Krajicek^{‡} | 23 | 0 | 1 | 1 | -4 | 21 |
| Ryan Craig | 3 | 0 | 0 | 0 | 0 | 5 |
| Vladimir Mihalik | 4 | 0 | 0 | 0 | -4 | 2 |
| Blair Jones | 14 | 0 | 0 | 0 | -5 | 10 |
| Matt Lashoff | 5 | 0 | 0 | 0 | -2 | 21 |
| Scott Jackson | 1 | 0 | 0 | 0 | 0 | 0 |
| Drew Miller^{‡} | 14 | 0 | 0 | 0 | -3 | 2 |

=== Goaltenders ===
Note: GP = Games played; TOI = Time on ice (minutes); W = Wins; L = Losses; OT = Overtime losses; GA = Goals against; GAA= Goals against average; SA= Shots against; SV= Saves; Sv% = Save percentage; SO= Shutouts

| Player | GP | Min | W | L | OT | GA | GAA | SA | Sv% | SO | G | A | PIM |
|---|---|---|---|---|---|---|---|---|---|---|---|---|---|
| Antero Niittymaki | 49 | 2657 | 21 | 18 | 5 | 127 | 2.87 | 1388 | .909 | 1 | 0 | 1 | 0 |
| Mike Smith | 42 | 2273 | 13 | 18 | 7 | 117 | 3.09 | 1165 | .900 | 2 | 0 | 0 | 14 |
| Dustin Tokarski | 2 | 44 | 0 | 0 | 0 | 3 | 4.09 | 16 | .813 | 0 | 0 | 0 | 0 |

^{†}Denotes player spent time with another team before joining Lightning. Stats reflect time with Lightning only.
^{‡}Traded mid-season
Bold/italics denotes franchise record

== Awards ==
=== Awards ===
Regular Season
| Player | Award | Awarded |
| Mike Smith | NHL Second Star of the Week | January 4, 2010 |
| Steven Stamkos | NHL First Star of the Week | February 15, 2010 |
| Steven Stamkos | NHL Second Star of the Week | March 8, 2010 |
| Steven Stamkos | Maurice Richard Trophy (Shared with Sidney Crosby) | April 11, 2010 |
| Martin St. Louis | Lady Byng Trophy winner | June 23, 2010 |

=== Milestones ===
Regular Season
| Player | Milestone | Reached |
| Victor Hedman | 1st Career NHL Game; 1st Career NHL Assist; 1st Career NHL Point | October 3, 2009 |
| James Wright | 1st Career NHL Game | October 3, 2009 |
| James Wright | 1st Career NHL Goal; 1st Career NHL Point | October 22, 2009 |
| James Wright | 1st Career NHL Assist | October 24, 2009 |

== Transactions ==
The Lightning have been involved in the following transactions during the 2009–10 season.

=== Trades ===
| Date | Details |
|---|---|---|
| June 26, 2009 | To Detroit Red Wings 2nd-round pick (32nd overall) in 2009; 3rd-round pick (75th overall) in 2009 | To Tampa Bay Lightning 1st-round pick (29th overall) in 2009 |
| July 21, 2009 | To Phoenix Coyotes Radim Vrbata | To Tampa Bay Lightning Todd Fedoruk; David Hale |
| August 13, 2009 | To Anaheim Ducks Evgeny Artyukhin | To Tampa Bay Lightning Drew Miller; 3rd-round pick in 2010 |
| March 3, 2010 | To Los Angeles Kings Jeff Halpern | To Tampa Bay Lightning Teddy Purcell; 3rd-round pick in 2010 |

=== Free agents acquired ===
| Player | Former team | Contract terms |
| Mattias Ohlund | Vancouver Canucks | 7 years, $26.25 million |
| Matt Walker | Chicago Blackhawks | 4 years, $6.8 million |
| Stephane Veilleux | Minnesota Wild | 1 year, $750,000 |
| Kurtis Foster | Minnesota Wild | 1 year, $600,000 |
| Antero Niittymaki | Philadelphia Flyers | 1 year, $600,000 |
| Alex Tanguay | Montreal Canadiens | 1 year, $2.5 million |
| Mitch Fritz | New York Islanders | 1 year |
| Mark Parrish | Dallas Stars | 1 year, 2-way contract |

=== Free agents lost ===
| Player | New team | Contract terms |
| David Koci | Colorado Avalanche | 1 year, $575,000 |
| Cory Murphy | New Jersey Devils | undisclosed |
| Richard Petiot | Chicago Blackhawks | 1 year |
| Geoff Kinrade | Ottawa Senators | 1 year, 2-way contract |
| Noah Welch | Atlanta Thrashers | undisclosed |
| Jason Ward | Philadelphia Flyers | 1 year |
| Brandon Segal | Los Angeles Kings | 2 years |
| Vaclav Prospal | New York Rangers | 1 year, $1.1 million |
| Matt Pettinger | Vancouver Canucks | undisclosed |
| Lukas Krajicek | Philadelphia Flyers | undisclosed |

=== Claimed via waivers ===
| Player | Former team | Date claimed off waivers |
| Radek Smolenak | Chicago Blackhawks | October 10, 2009 |
| Nate Thompson | New York Islanders | January 21, 2010 |

=== Lost via waivers ===
| Player | New team | Date claimed off waivers |
|---|---|---|
| Radek Smolenak | Chicago Blackhawks | September 25, 2009 |
| Drew Miller | Detroit Red Wings | November 11, 2009 |

=== Player signings ===
| Player | Contract terms |
| Mitch Fadden | 3 years |
| Lukas Krajicek | 1 year, $1.475 million |
| Victor Hedman | 3 years |
| Blair Jones | undisclosed |
| Lauri Tukonen | undisclosed |
| Matt Smaby | 2 years, $1.05 million |
| Martins Karsums | 1 year |
| Matt Lashoff | 2 years |
| Mike Lundin | 1 year |
| Radek Smolenak | 1 year |
| James Wright | 3-year entry-level contract |
| Carter Ashton | 3-year entry-level contract |
| Jaroslav Janus | 3-year entry-level contract |
| Johan Harju | 1 year |

== Draft picks ==
Tampa Bay's picks at the 2009 NHL entry draft in Montreal.

| Round | Pick | Player | Position | Nationality | Club Team |
|---|---|---|---|---|---|
| 1 | 2 | Victor Hedman | (D) | Sweden | Modo Hockey (Elitserien) |
| 1 | 29 (from Detroit) | Carter Ashton | (RW) | Canada | Lethbridge Hurricanes (WHL) |
| 2 | 52 (from Philadelphia) | Richard Panik | (RW) | Slovakia | Ocelari Trinec (Czech Extraliga) |
| 4 | 93 | Alex Hutchings | (LW) | Canada | Barrie Colts (OHL) |
| 5 | 148 (from Carolina via Nashville) | Michael Zador | (G) | Canada | Oshawa Generals (OHL) |
| 6 | 162 (from Nashville) | Jaroslav Janus | (G) | Slovakia | Erie Otters (OHL) |
| 7 | 183 | Kirill Gotovets | (D) | Belarus | Shattuck-Saint Mary's (USHS-MN) |

== See also ==
- 2009–10 NHL season
