= List of Washington Capitals seasons =

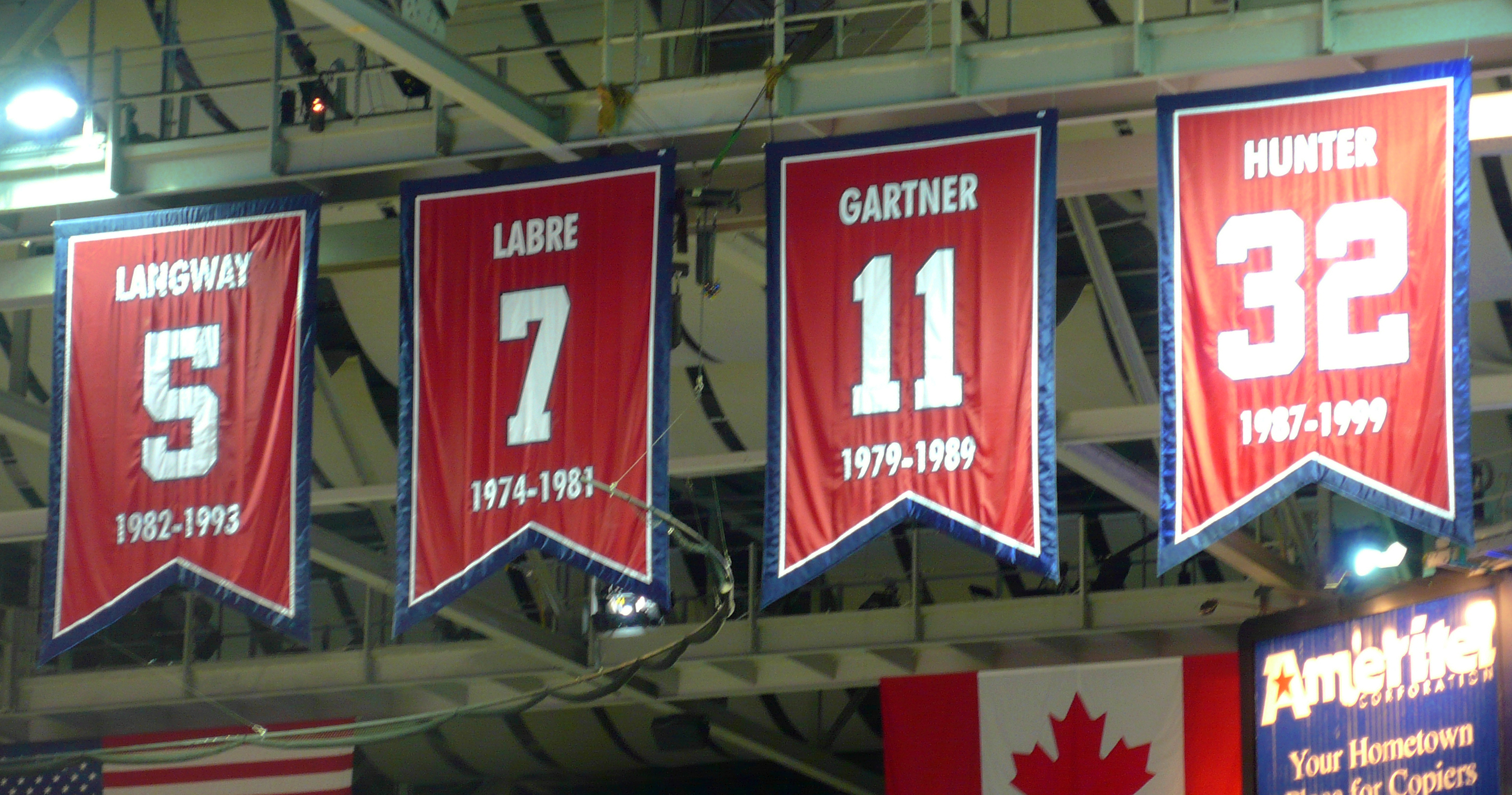
Banners at the Capital One Arena showing the Capitals' retired numbers

The Washington Capitals are a professional ice hockey team based in Washington, D.C. The team is a member of the Metropolitan Division of the Eastern Conference of the National Hockey League (NHL). The Capitals played at the Capital Centre from their inaugural season in 1974 to 1997, when they moved to the MCI Center, now known as the Capital One Arena. In 49 completed seasons, the Capitals have qualified for the Stanley Cup playoffs 33 times, making two Stanley Cup Final appearances during the 1997–98 and 2017–18 seasons, winning the latter.

The Capitals were founded in 1974 as an expansion team in the Prince of Wales Conference. The team had an 8–67–5 record and lost 37 straight road games in their inaugural season. The Capitals made their first playoffs in the 1982–83 season and qualified for the playoffs for the following 13 seasons in a row. The Capitals won the Eastern Conference during their 1997–98 season but were swept by the Detroit Red Wings in the 1998 Stanley Cup Final.

After reaching the Finals, the Capitals were assigned to the Southeast Division, in which they remained in for 15 years, until an NHL division realignment brought them into the newly formed Metropolitan Division in 2013. Through these times, the Capitals won three Presidents' Trophies in the 2009–10, 2015–16 and 2016–17 seasons, before finally winning their first Stanley Cup in the 2017–18 season after 42 seasons (not counting the cancelled 2004–05 season).

== Table key ==
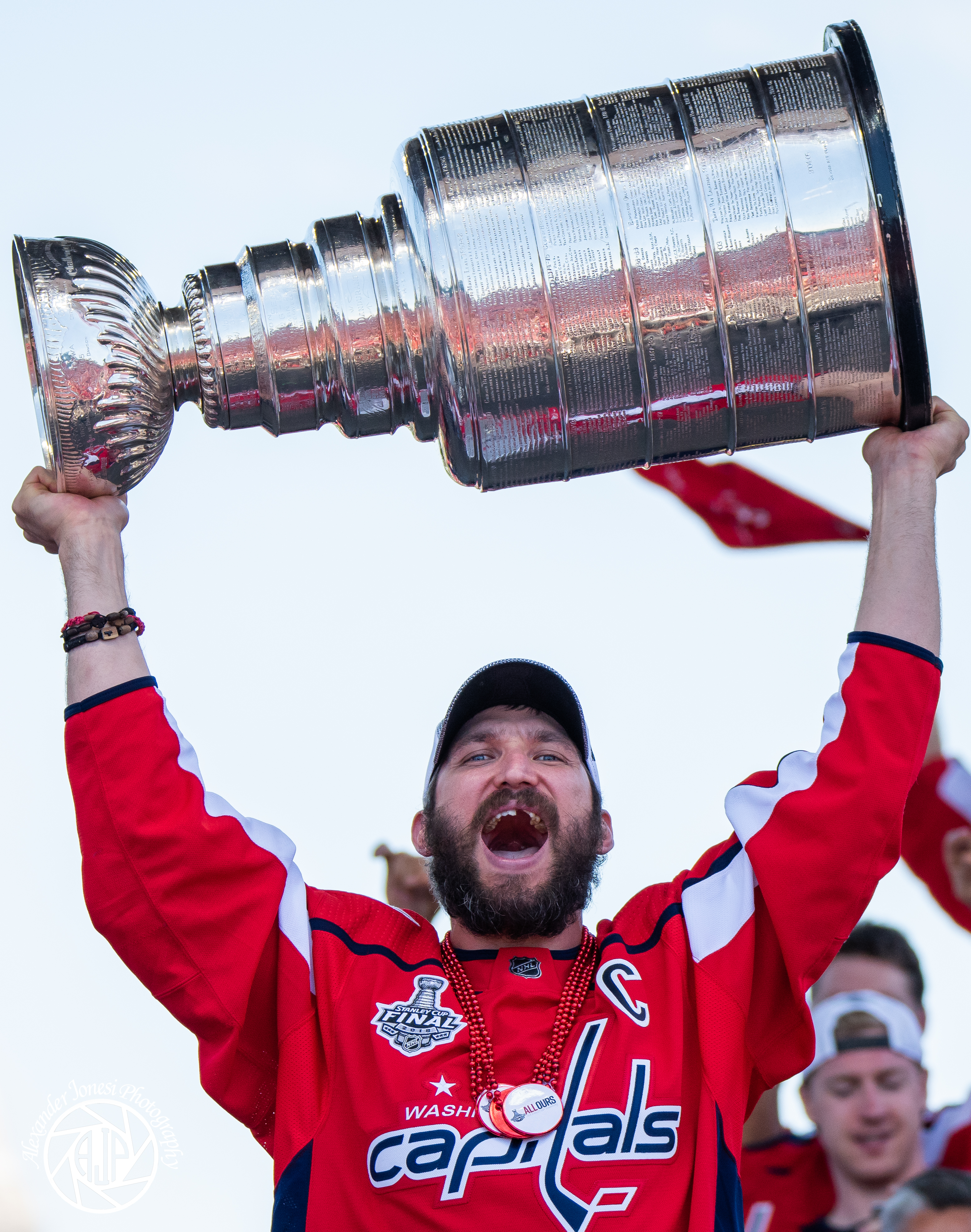
Alex Ovechkin raising the Stanley Cup during the Capitals' 2018 championship ceremony on the National Mall

Key of colors and symbols
Color/symbol	Explanation
†	Stanley Cup champions
‡	Conference champions
↑	Division champions
#	Led league in points

Key of terms and abbreviations
Term or abbreviation	Definition
Finish	Final position in division or league standings
GP	Number of games played
W	Number of wins
L	Number of losses
T	Number of ties
OT	Number of losses in overtime (since the 1999–2000 season)
Pts	Number of points
GF	Goals for (goals scored by the Capitals)
GA	Goals against (goals scored by the Capitals' opponents)
—	Does not apply

== Year by year ==
Year by year listing of all seasons played by the Washington Capitals
NHL season	Capitals season	Conference	Division	Regular season									Postseason						
NHL season	Capitals season	Conference	Division	Finish	GP	W	L	T	OT	Pts	GF	GA	GP	W	L	OT	GF	GA	Result
1974–75	1974–75	Wales	Norris	5th	80	8	67	5	—	21	181	446	—	—	—	—	—	—	Did not qualify
1975–76	1975–76	Wales	Norris	5th	80	11	59	10	—	32	224	394	—	—	—	—	—	—	Did not qualify
1976–77	1976–77	Wales	Norris	4th	80	24	42	14	—	62	221	307	—	—	—	—	—	—	Did not qualify
1977–78	1977–78	Wales	Norris	5th	80	17	49	14	—	48	195	321	—	—	—	—	—	—	Did not qualify
1978–79	1978–79	Wales	Norris	4th	80	24	41	15	—	63	273	338	—	—	—	—	—	—	Did not qualify
1979–80	1979–80	Campbell	Patrick	5th	80	27	40	13	—	67	261	293	—	—	—	—	—	—	Did not qualify
1980–81	1980–81	Campbell	Patrick	5th	80	26	36	18	—	70	286	317	—	—	—	—	—	—	Did not qualify
1981–82	1981–82	Wales	Patrick	5th	80	26	41	13	—	65	319	338	—	—	—	—	—	—	Did not qualify
1982–83	1982–83	Wales	Patrick	3rd	80	39	25	16	—	94	306	283	4	1	3	—	11	19	Lost division semifinals to New York Islanders, 1–3
1983–84	1983–84	Wales	Patrick	2nd	80	48	27	5	—	101	308	226	8	4	4	—	28	25	Won division semifinals vs. Philadelphia Flyers, 3–0; Lost division finals to New York Islanders, 1–4
1984–85	1984–85	Wales	Patrick	2nd	80	46	25	9	—	101	322	240	5	2	3	—	12	14	Lost division semifinals to New York Islanders, 2–3
1985–86	1985–86	Wales	Patrick	2nd	80	50	23	7	—	107	315	272	9	5	4	—	36	24	Won division semifinals vs. New York Islanders, 3–0; Lost division finals to New York Rangers, 2–4
1986–87	1986–87	Wales	Patrick	2nd	80	38	32	10	—	86	285	278	7	3	4	—	19	19	Lost division semifinals to New York Islanders, 3–4
1987–88	1987–88	Wales	Patrick	2nd	80	38	33	9	—	85	281	249	14	7	7	—	54	50	Won division semifinals vs. Philadelphia Flyers, 4–3; Lost division finals to New Jersey Devils, 3–4
1988–89	1988–89	Wales	Patrick↑	1st	80	41	29	10	—	92	305	259	6	2	4	—	18	25	Lost division semifinals to Philadelphia Flyers, 2–4
1989–90	1989–90	Wales	Patrick	3rd	80	36	38	6	—	78	284	275	15	8	7	—	49	48	Won division semifinals vs. New Jersey Devils, 4–2; Won division finals vs. New York Rangers, 4–1; Lost conference finals to Boston Bruins, 0–4
1990–91	1990–91	Wales	Patrick	3rd	80	37	36	7	—	81	258	258	11	5	6	—	29	35	Won division semifinals vs. New York Rangers, 4–2; Lost division finals to Pittsburgh Penguins, 1–4
1991–92	1991–92	Wales	Patrick	2nd	80	45	27	8	—	98	330	275	7	3	4	—	27	25	Lost division semifinals to Pittsburgh Penguins, 3–4
1992–93	1992–93^{[a]}	Wales	Patrick	2nd	84	43	34	7	—	93	325	286	6	2	4	—	15	23	Lost division semifinals to New York Islanders, 2–4
1993–94	1993–94	Eastern^{[b]}	Atlantic	3rd	84	39	35	10	—	88	277	263	11	5	6	—	32	32	Won conference quarterfinals vs. Pittsburgh Penguins, 4–2; Lost conference semifinals to New York Rangers, 1–4
1994–95	1994–95^{[c]}	Eastern	Atlantic	2nd	48	22	18	8	—	52	136	120	7	3	4	—	10	17	Lost conference quarterfinals to Pittsburgh Penguins, 3–4
1995–96	1995–96	Eastern	Atlantic	4th	82	39	32	11	—	89	234	204	6	2	4	—	17	21	Lost conference quarterfinals to Pittsburgh Penguins, 2–4
1996–97	1996–97	Eastern	Atlantic	5th	82	33	40	9	—	75	214	231	—	—	—	—	—	—	Did not qualify
1997–98	1997–98	Eastern‡	Atlantic	3rd	82	40	30	12	—	92	219	202	21	12	9	—	53	44	Won conference quarterfinals vs. Boston Bruins, 4–2; Won conference semifinals vs. Ottawa Senators, 4–1; Won conference finals vs. Buffalo Sabres, 4–2; Lost Stanley Cup Final to Detroit Red Wings, 0–4
1998–99	1998–99	Eastern	Southeast^{[g]}	3rd	82	31	45	6	—	68	200	218	—	—	—	—	—	—	Did not qualify
1999–2000	1999–2000	Eastern	Southeast↑	1st	82	44	24	12	2^{[d]}	102	227	194	5	1	4	—	6	15	Lost conference quarterfinals to Pittsburgh Penguins, 1–4
2000–01	2000–01	Eastern	Southeast↑	1st	82	41	27	10	4	96	233	211	6	2	4	—	10	14	Lost conference quarterfinals to Pittsburgh Penguins, 2–4
2001–02	2001–02	Eastern	Southeast	2nd	82	36	33	11	2	85	228	240	—	—	—	—	—	—	Did not qualify
2002–03	2002–03	Eastern	Southeast	2nd	82	39	29	8	6	92	224	220	6	2	4	—	15	14	Lost conference quarterfinals to Tampa Bay Lightning, 2–4
2003–04	2003–04	Eastern	Southeast	5th	82	23	46	10	3	59	186	253	—	—	—	—	—	—	Did not qualify
2004–05^{[e]}	2004–05	Eastern	Southeast	Season cancelled due to 2004–05 NHL lockout															
2005–06	2005–06	Eastern	Southeast	5th	82	29	41	—^{[f]}	12	70	237	306	—	—	—	—	—	—	Did not qualify
2006–07	2006–07	Eastern	Southeast	5th	82	28	40	—	14	70	235	286	—	—	—	—	—	—	Did not qualify
2007–08	2007–08	Eastern	Southeast↑	1st	82	43	31	—	8	94	242	231	7	3	4	—	20	23	Lost conference quarterfinals to Philadelphia Flyers, 3–4
2008–09	2008–09	Eastern	Southeast↑	1st	82	50	24	—	8	108	272	245	14	7	7	—	41	38	Won conference quarterfinals vs. New York Rangers, 4–3; Lost conference semifinals to Pittsburgh Penguins, 3–4
2009–10	2009–10	Eastern	Southeast↑	1st	82	54	15	—	13	121#	318	233	7	3	4	—	22	20	Lost conference quarterfinals to Montreal Canadiens, 3–4
2010–11	2010–11	Eastern	Southeast↑	1st	82	48	23	—	11	107	224	197	9	4	5	—	23	24	Won conference quarterfinals vs. New York Rangers, 4–1; Lost conference semifinals to Tampa Bay Lightning, 0–4
2011–12	2011–12	Eastern	Southeast	2nd	82	42	32	—	8	92	222	230	14	7	7	—	28	30	Won conference quarterfinals vs. Boston Bruins, 4–3; Lost conference semifinals to New York Rangers, 3–4
2012–13^{[h]}	2012–13	Eastern	Southeast↑	1st	48	27	18	—	3	57	149	130	7	3	4	—	13	15	Lost conference quarterfinals to New York Rangers, 3–4
2013–14	2013–14	Eastern	Metropolitan^{[i]}	5th	82	38	30	—	14	90	235	240	—	—	—	—	—	—	Did not qualify
2014–15	2014–15	Eastern	Metropolitan	2nd	82	45	26	—	11	101	242	203	14	7	7	—	28	28	Won first round vs. New York Islanders, 4–3; Lost second round to New York Rangers, 3–4
2015–16	2015–16	Eastern	Metropolitan↑	1st	82	56	18	—	8	120#	252	193	12	6	6	—	29	22	Won first round vs. Philadelphia Flyers, 4–2; Lost second round to Pittsburgh Penguins, 2–4
2016–17	2016–17	Eastern	Metropolitan↑	1st	82	55	19	—	8	118#	263	182	13	7	6	—	36	34	Won first round vs. Toronto Maple Leafs, 4–2; Lost second round to Pittsburgh Penguins, 3–4
2017–18†	2017–18	Eastern‡	Metropolitan↑	1st	82	49	26	—	7	105	259	239	24	16	8	—	86	61	Won first round vs. Columbus Blue Jackets, 4–2; Won second round vs. Pittsburgh Penguins, 4–2; Won conference finals vs. Tampa Bay Lightning, 4–3; Won Stanley Cup Final vs. Vegas Golden Knights, 4–1
2018–19	2018–19	Eastern	Metropolitan↑	1st	82	48	26	—	8	104	278	249	7	3	4	—	20	21	Lost first round to Carolina Hurricanes, 3–4
2019–20	2019–20	Eastern	Metropolitan↑	1st	69	41	20	—	8	90	240	215	8	2	5	1	13	24	Finished third in seeding round-robin (1–1–1); Lost first round to New York Islanders, 1–4
2020–21	2020–21	—	East	2nd	56	36	15	—	5	77	191	163	5	1	4	—	10	16	Lost first round to Boston Bruins, 1–4
2021–22	2021–22	Eastern	Metropolitan	4th	82	44	26	—	12	100	275	245	6	2	4	—	19	20	Lost first round to Florida Panthers, 2–4
2022–23	2022–23	Eastern	Metropolitan	6th	82	35	37	—	10	80	255	265	—	—	—	—	—	—	Did not qualify
2023–24	2023–24	Eastern	Metropolitan	4th	82	40	31	—	11	91	220	257	4	0	4	—	7	15	Lost first round to New York Rangers, 0–4
2024–25	2024–25	Eastern	Metropolitan↑	1st	82	51	22	—	9	111	288	232	10	5	5	—	25	27	Won first round vs. Montreal Canadiens, 4–1; Lost second round to Carolina Hurricanes, 1–4
2025–26	2025–26	Eastern	Metropolitan	4th	82	43	30	—	9	95	263	244	—	—	—	—	—	—	Did not qualify
Totals					4,043	1,913	1,613	303	214	4,343	12,817	12,796	315	145	169	1	887	899	34 playoff appearances

== Notes ==
- ^{a} In 1992, the NHL expanded the season to 84 games, and each team played two games at a neutral site. After the 1995 lockout, the neutral site games were eliminated, and the season was reduced to 82 games.
- ^{b} The NHL realigned into Eastern and Western conferences prior to the 1993–94 season. Washington was placed in the Atlantic Division of the Eastern Conference.
- ^{c} The season was shortened to 48 games because of the 1994–95 NHL lockout.
- ^{d} Beginning with the 1999–00 season, teams received one point for losing a regular season game in overtime.
- ^{e} The season was canceled because of the 2004–05 NHL lockout.
- ^{f} Before the 2005–06 season, the NHL instituted a penalty shootout for regular season games that remained tied after a five-minute overtime period, which prevented ties.
- ^{g} The NHL added 4 expansion teams prior to the 1998–99 season and split the Eastern Conference into three divisions: Northeast, Atlantic, and Southeast. Washington was moved into the new Southeast division.
- ^{h} The season was shortened to 48 games because of the 2012–13 NHL lockout.
- ^{i} The NHL realigned prior to the 2013–14 season. Washington was placed in the Metropolitan Division of the Eastern Conference.
- ^{j} The 2019-20 NHL season was suspended on March 12, 2020, because of the COVID-19 pandemic. The top 24 teams in the league qualified for the playoffs.
- ^{k} The 2020–21 NHL season was shortened to 56 games because of the COVID-19 pandemic.
