= Milan Jurčina =

Slovak ice hockey player (born 1983)

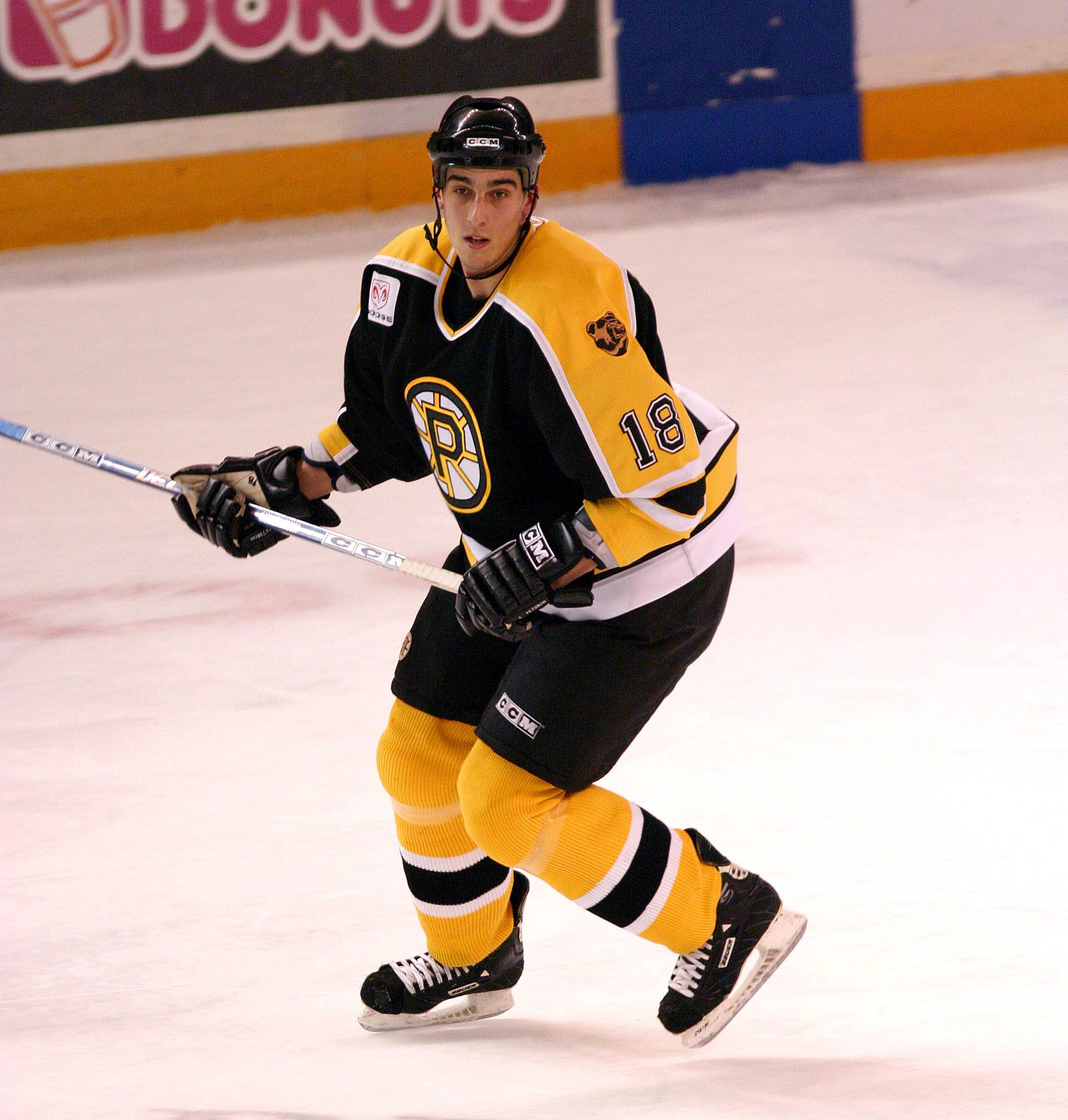
- Jurčina with the Providence Bruins in 2005
- Born: 7 June 1983 (age 42) Liptovský Mikuláš, Czechoslovakia
- Height: 6 ft 4 in (193 cm)
- Weight: 243 lb (110 kg; 17 st 5 lb)
- Position: Defence
- Shot: Right
- Played for: Boston Bruins; Washington Capitals; Columbus Blue Jackets; New York Islanders; Lukko; HC Fribourg-Gottéron; Dinamo Riga; KHL Medveščak Zagreb; Eisbären Berlin; Thomas Sabo Ice Tigers; HC Sparta Praha
- National team: Slovakia
- NHL draft: 241st overall, 2001; Boston Bruins
- Playing career: 2003–2023

Milan Jurčina (Slovak pronunciation: [ˈmilan ˈjurtʂina]; born 7 June 1983) is a Slovak ice hockey scout and former professional ice hockey defenceman who currently serves as a European scout for the Boston Bruins of the National Hockey League (NHL). He has previously played in the National Hockey League (NHL) for the Boston Bruins (the organization that drafted him 241st overall in the 2001 NHL entry draft), Washington Capitals, Columbus Blue Jackets and New York Islanders. Internationally, he has played for the Slovak national team.

== Playing career ==
Jurčina began his career with Liptovský Mikuláš' under-18 and -20 teams from 1997 to 2000 to

The 6-foot-4 Jurčina was drafted by the Boston Bruins 241st overall in the 2001 NHL entry draft. After spending three seasons with the Halifax Mooseheads of the Quebec Major Junior Hockey League (QMJHL), Jurcina began his American Hockey League (AHL) career with the Providence Bruins in the 2003–04 season and was brought into the main Boston Bruins roster during the 2005–06 season.

On 1 February 2007, Jurčina was traded to the Washington Capitals in exchange for a conditional fourth-round draft pick in 2008. He was later re-signed to a two-year deal by the Capitals on 27 July 2007.

Jurčina, along with Capitals captain Chris Clark, were traded to the Columbus Blue Jackets on 28 December 2009 in exchange for winger Jason Chimera.

Jurčina was selected to represent Slovakia in the 2010 Winter Olympics in Vancouver, finishing fourth with his team.

At the trade deadline on 3 March 2010 Jurčina was traded back to the Washington Capitals in exchange for a conditional sixth-round draft pick in the 2010 NHL entry draft. However, surgery to repair a sports hernia prevented him from playing in the remainder of the 2009–10 season.

On 2 July 2010 Jurčina, an unrestricted free agent, signed a one-year, $1 million contract with the New York Islanders.

On 22 August 2014 Jurčina joined Dinamo Riga of the Kontinental Hockey League (KHL) on trial, eventually signing a one-year contract eight days later.

Jurčina remained in the KHL in 2015–16, but took his game to Croatia, suiting up for Medveščak Zagreb. He made 49 appearances for the club, scoring four goals while assisting on ten more. In early February 2016, Jurčina parted ways with Medveščak to finish the season elsewhere. On 15 February 2016 he put pen to paper on a contract with Eisbären Berlin of the German top-tier Deutsche Eishockey Liga (DEL) for the remainder of the 2015–16 season.

In September 2016, he signed a multi-year deal with fellow DEL side Thomas Sabo Ice Tigers to begin from the 2016–17 season.

== Career statistics ==
=== Regular season and playoffs ===
			Regular season					Playoffs
Season	Team	League	GP	G	A	Pts	PIM	GP	G	A	Pts	PIM
1999–2000	HK 32 Liptovský Mikuláš	SVK U20	58	1	15	16	56	—	—	—	—	—
2000–01	Halifax Mooseheads	QMJHL	68	0	5	5	56	6	0	2	2	12
2001–02	Halifax Mooseheads	QMJHL	61	4	16	20	58	13	5	3	8	10
2002–03	Halifax Mooseheads	QMJHL	51	15	13	28	102	25	6	6	12	40
2003–04	Providence Bruins	AHL	73	5	12	17	52	2	0	1	1	2
2004–05	Providence Bruins	AHL	79	6	17	23	92	17	1	3	4	30
2005–06	Providence Bruins	AHL	7	0	3	3	8	—	—	—	—	—
2005–06	Boston Bruins	NHL	51	6	5	11	54	—	—	—	—	—
2006–07	Boston Bruins	NHL	40	2	1	3	20	—	—	—	—	—
2006–07	Washington Capitals	NHL	30	2	7	9	24	—	—	—	—	—
2007–08	Washington Capitals	NHL	75	1	8	9	30	7	0	0	0	6
2008–09	Washington Capitals	NHL	79	3	11	14	68	14	2	0	2	12
2009–10	Washington Capitals	NHL	27	0	4	4	14	—	—	—	—	—
2009–10	Columbus Blue Jackets	NHL	17	1	2	3	10	—	—	—	—	—
2010–11	New York Islanders	NHL	46	4	13	17	30	—	—	—	—	—
2011–12	New York Islanders	NHL	65	3	8	11	30	—	—	—	—	—
2012–13	Piráti Chomutov	ELH	22	0	3	3	20	—	—	—	—	—
2012–13	Lukko	SM-l	14	5	2	7	26	12	1	6	7	16
2013–14	TPS	Liiga	21	1	5	6	18	—	—	—	—	—
2013–14	HC Fribourg–Gottéron	NLA	2	0	0	0	0	—	—	—	—	—
2014–15	Dinamo Riga	KHL	46	5	5	10	46	—	—	—	—	—
2015–16	KHL Medveščak Zagreb	KHL	49	4	9	13	12	—	—	—	—	—
2015–16	Eisbären Berlin	DEL	8	0	4	4	6	5	0	0	0	27
2016–17	Thomas Sabo Ice Tigers	DEL	37	5	11	16	38	—	—	—	—	—
2017–18	Thomas Sabo Ice Tigers	DEL	49	2	11	13	59	—	—	—	—	—
2018–19	Thomas Sabo Ice Tigers	DEL	37	1	9	10	24	6	0	1	1	4
2019–20	HC Sparta Praha	ELH	29	3	6	9	48	—	—	—	—	—
2020–21	HC Sparta Praha	ELH	21	3	3	6	16	11	0	2	2	8
2021–22	HC Sparta Praha	ELH	23	0	1	1	39	16	0	1	1	6
NHL totals			430	22	59	81	280	21	2	0	2	18

=== International ===
Year	Team	Event	GP	G	A	Pts	PIM
2001	Slovakia	WJC18	6	0	0	0	6
2002	Slovakia	WJC	7	1	1	2	14
2003	Slovakia	WJC	1	0	0	0	0
2006	Slovakia	OG	6	0	1	1	8
2006	Slovakia	WC	7	2	1	3	8
2007	Slovakia	WC	7	1	1	2	8
2010	Slovakia	OG	7	0	0	0	0
2011	Slovakia	WC	6	0	2	2	4
2013	Slovakia	WC	8	0	2	2	6
2014	Slovakia	OG	4	0	0	0	0
2015	Slovakia	WC	7	0	0	0	4
Junior totals			14	1	1	2	20
Senior totals			52	3	7	10	38
