= Chris Clark (ice hockey) =

American ice hockey player (born 1976)

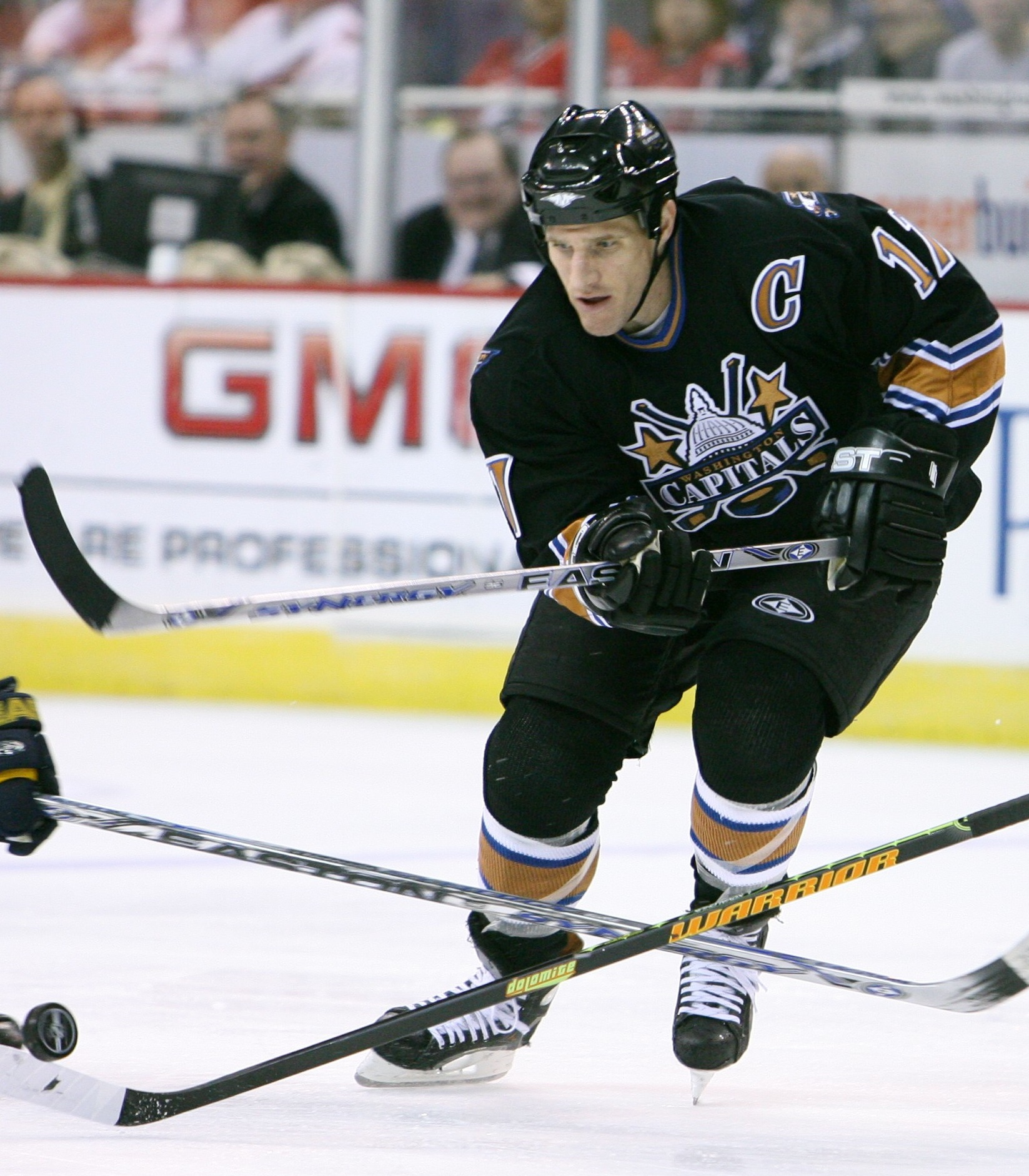
- Clark with the Washington Capitals in January 2007
- Born: March 8, 1976 (age 50) South Windsor, Connecticut, U.S.
- Height: 6 ft 0 in (183 cm)
- Weight: 200 lb (91 kg; 14 st 4 lb)
- Position: Right wing
- Shot: Right
- Played for: Calgary Flames; Washington Capitals; Columbus Blue Jackets; SC Bern; Storhamar Dragons
- National team: United States
- NHL draft: 77th overall, 1994; Calgary Flames
- Playing career: 1998–2011

Chris Clark (born March 8, 1976) is an American former professional ice hockey right winger who played in the National Hockey League (NHL) for the Calgary Flames, Washington Capitals and Columbus Blue Jackets.

In 2019, he was named the general manager of the American Hockey League's Cleveland Monsters.

== Playing career ==
=== College ===
Clark played four years for the Clarkson Golden Knights in the ECAC (NCAA Division I), recording 128 points (63 goals and 65 assists) and 392 penalty minutes in 142 games. He was named to the ECAC Second All-Star team in 1998.

=== Professional ===
Clark was drafted in the third round, 77th overall, by the Calgary Flames in the 1994 NHL entry draft. He played five seasons with the Flames. In his final season with the team, he played in every game and helped the team to the 2004 Stanley Cup Finals, which they lost to the Tampa Bay Lightning.

Clark was traded to the Washington Capitals as a restricted free agent on August 4, 2005, in exchange for a conditional pick in the 2006 Entry Draft. He scored 20 goals and 19 assists (39 points) with the Capitals in his first season, playing alongside rookie Alexander Ovechkin. The Capitals named Clark their new team captain on September 13, 2006. Clark then set career-high numbers in goals (30), assists (24) and points (54) during the 2006–07 season, continuing to play alongside Ovechkin.

Clark was injured in the third period of a 2–1 shootout loss to the Florida Panthers on November 28, 2007, and missed the next 18 games with a strained groin muscle. He returned to the lineup on February 13, 2008, but played only one shift against the Philadelphia Flyers. Clark kicked out his skate in an attempt to stop a pass when he aggravated the groin injury. Clark missed the remainder of the regular season and playoffs.

After suffering a wrist injury in February 2009, Clark required surgery which ended his 2008–09 season. He skated with the team during the pre-game skate before Game 5 of the 2009 Stanley Cup playoff game against the New York Rangers, but did not return until Game 7, taking the place of Donald Brashear, who was suspended for six games after his late hit on New York's Blair Betts.

On December 28, 2009, Clark (along with defenseman Milan Jurčina) was traded to the Columbus Blue Jackets in exchange for winger Jason Chimera. At the time of the trade, Clark was the third-longest tenured captain in the history of the Washington Capitals, behind only Hockey Hall of Famer Rod Langway and Dale Hunter; all three were later surpassed by Ovechkin.

During the 2011 off-season, Clark accepted a try-out invitation from the Boston Bruins. Despite having an impressive pre-season, he was released from the Bruins training camp on October 5, 2011, without a contract. On November 3, 2011, Clark signed a professional tryout agreement with the Providence Bruins, the American Hockey League (AHL) affiliate of the Boston Bruins. He was released by Providence on November 21, 2011, after six games, failing to record a point during his tryout period.

== Retirement ==
After he was released by Providence, Clark took up a scouting position with the Columbus Blue Jackets organization for the remainder of the 2011–12 season before being named the team's development coach. In 2019, the Blue Jackets named him the general manager of their American Hockey League affiliate, the Cleveland Monsters.

== International play ==
During the 2004–05 NHL lockout Clark continued his career in Europe. Clark first played through a short stint with Swiss team SC Bern, then with Norwegian outfit Storhamar Dragons.

In 2007, Clark was chosen as the captain of the United States national team for the 2007 IIHF World Championship, where he scored two goals and one assist in six games.

== Career statistics ==
=== Regular season and playoffs ===
			Regular season					Playoffs
Season	Team	League	GP	G	A	Pts	PIM	GP	G	A	Pts	PIM
1990–91	South Windsor High School	HS-CT	23	16	15	31	24	—	—	—	—	—
1991–92	Springfield Olympics	NEJHL	49	21	29	50	56	—	—	—	—	—
1992–93	Springfield Olympics	NEJHL	43	17	60	77	120	—	—	—	—	—
1993–94	Springfield Olympics	NEJHL	35	31	26	57	185	—	—	—	—	—
1994–95	Clarkson University	ECAC	32	12	11	23	92	—	—	—	—	—
1995–96	Clarkson University	ECAC	38	10	8	18	106	—	—	—	—	—
1996–97	Clarkson University	ECAC	37	23	25	48	86	—	—	—	—	—
1997–98	Clarkson University	ECAC	35	18	21	39	106	—	—	—	—	—
1998–99	Saint John Flames	AHL	73	13	27	40	123	7	2	4	6	15
1999–2000	Saint John Flames	AHL	48	16	17	33	134	—	—	—	—	—
1999–2000	Calgary Flames	NHL	22	0	1	1	14	—	—	—	—	—
2000–01	Saint John Flames	AHL	48	18	17	35	131	18	4	10	14	39
2000–01	Calgary Flames	NHL	29	5	1	6	38	—	—	—	—	—
2001–02	Calgary Flames	NHL	64	10	7	17	79	—	—	—	—	—
2002–03	Calgary Flames	NHL	81	10	12	22	126	—	—	—	—	—
2003–04	Calgary Flames	NHL	82	10	15	25	106	26	3	3	6	30
2004–05	SC Bern	NLA	3	0	0	0	6	—	—	—	—	—
2004–05	Storhamar Dragons	GET	15	10	4	14	86	7	4	4	8	14
2005–06	Washington Capitals	NHL	78	20	19	39	110	—	—	—	—	—
2006–07	Washington Capitals	NHL	74	30	24	54	66	—	—	—	—	—
2007–08	Washington Capitals	NHL	18	5	4	9	43	—	—	—	—	—
2008–09	Washington Capitals	NHL	32	1	5	6	32	8	1	0	1	8
2009–10	Washington Capitals	NHL	38	4	11	15	27	—	—	—	—	—
2009–10	Columbus Blue Jackets	NHL	36	3	2	5	21	—	—	—	—	—
2010–11	Columbus Blue Jackets	NHL	53	5	10	15	38	—	—	—	—	—
2011–12	Providence Bruins	AHL	6	0	0	0	4	—	—	—	—	—
NHL totals			607	103	111	214	700	34	4	3	7	38

=== International ===
Year	Team	Event	Result	GP	G	A	Pts	PIM
2002	United States	WC	7th	7	2	0	2	6
2007	United States	WC	5th	6	2	1	3	4
Senior totals				13	4	1	5	10

== Awards and honors ==
Award	Year
All-ECAC Hockey Rookie Team	1994–95
All-ECAC Hockey Second team	1997–98

Sporting positions
Preceded by Jeff Halpern	Washington Capitals captain 2006–09	Succeeded by Alexander Ovechkin
