= Jason Chimera =

Canadian ice hockey player (born 1979)

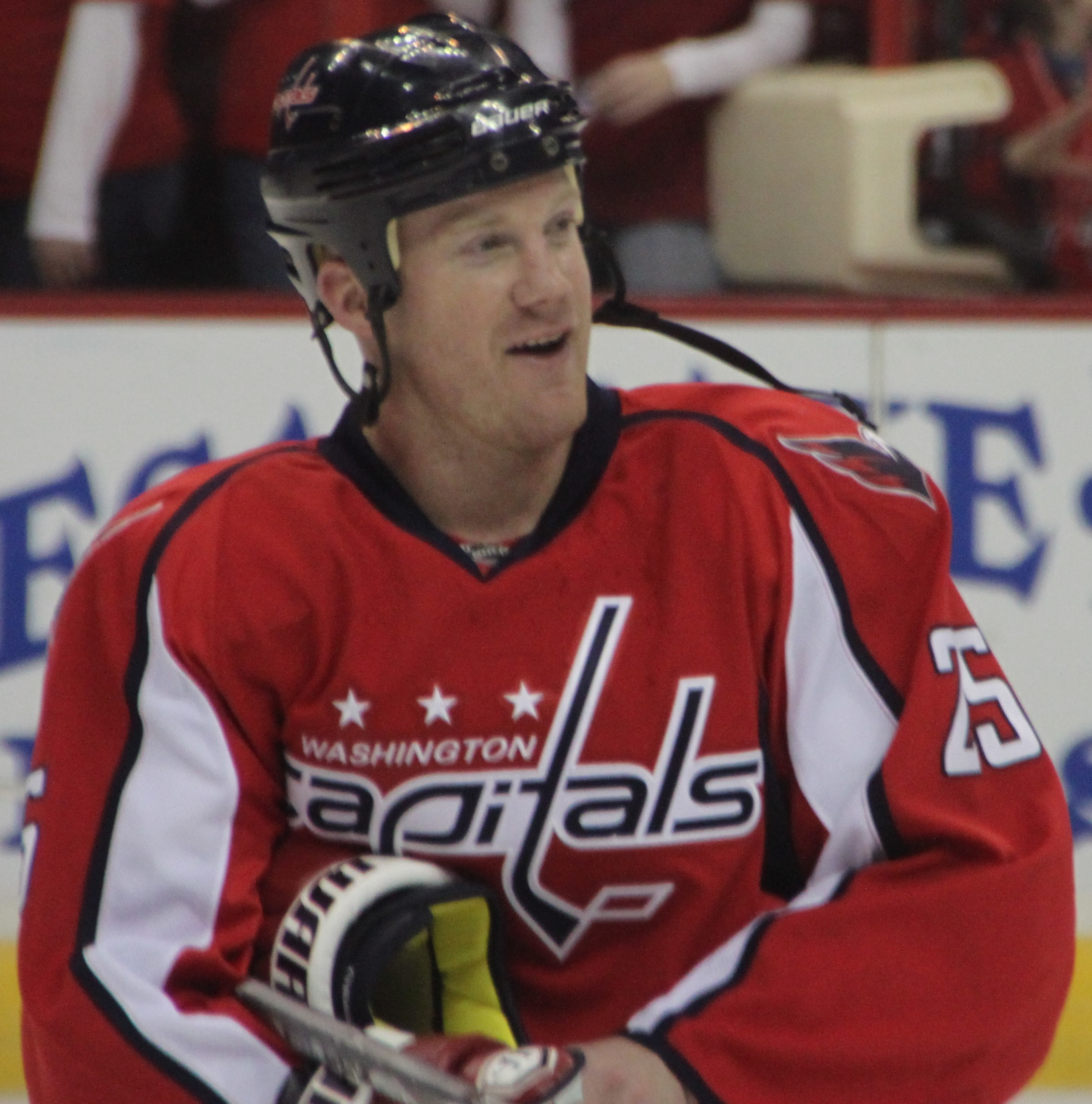
- Chimera with the Washington Capitals in January 2010
- Born: May 2, 1979 (age 47) Edmonton, Alberta, Canada
- Height: 6 ft 2 in (188 cm)
- Weight: 205 lb (93 kg; 14 st 9 lb)
- Position: Left wing
- Shot: Left
- Played for: Edmonton Oilers; Columbus Blue Jackets; Washington Capitals; New York Islanders; Anaheim Ducks
- National team: Canada
- NHL draft: 121st overall, 1997; Edmonton Oilers
- Playing career: 1999–2018

Jason Chimera (/tʃɪˈmɛərə/; born May 2, 1979) is a Canadian former professional ice hockey left winger who played for five teams in the National Hockey League (NHL).

== Playing career ==
Chimera played his junior career in the WHL, for Medicine Hat and Brandon. He was selected 121st overall in the 1997 NHL entry draft by his hometown team, the Edmonton Oilers, mostly because of his outstanding skating. Chimera played three seasons on the Hamilton Bulldogs, which at that point was the Oilers' farm team in the American Hockey League. In his final season, he was named to the AHL First All-Star team.

Chimera played two seasons for Edmonton before being traded to the Phoenix Coyotes for draft choices. Because of the NHL lockout, he did not play the following season and went to play in Italy for Mastini Varese. Chimera was subsequently dealt to the Columbus Blue Jackets, without playing a game in Phoenix, as part of a trade for Geoff Sanderson.

With the Blue Jackets, Chimera predominantly played left wing on the team's third line. He was usually centered by Manny Malhotra and spent significant time playing alongside right wingers such as Dan Fritsche and Trevor Letowski. However, Chimera began the 2008–09 season as the veteran presence on a line with rookies Derick Brassard and Jakub Voracek.

He was a member of the 2007 Canadian IIHF World Championship team that won gold in a 4–2 win against Finland in Moscow.

Chimera was traded to the Washington Capitals on December 28, 2009 for Chris Clark, the Capitals captain, and Milan Jurčina. The trade came less than two months after Capitals superstar Alexander Ovechkin was injured either during a scrum/fight with Chimera, or as Ovechkin exited the penalty box, colliding with Columbus' Raffi Torres. The injury was the longest of Ovechkin's career at the time, keeping him out of six games.

On April 20, 2011, during the first round of the 2011 Stanley Cup playoffs against the New York Rangers, Chimera scored the game-winning goal for the Capitals to win Game 4 on the road in double overtime, 4–3, which is currently the longest playoff game victory in franchise history with a record time of 92:36.

Chimera was re-signed a two-year contract extension with the Capitals on November 8, 2013.

On July 1, 2016, Chimera signed a two-year deal as a free agent with the New York Islanders. During the subsequent season, Chimera played in his 1,000th game.

In the 2017–18 season, his final season under contract with the Islanders, Chimera was dealt at the trade deadline to the Anaheim Ducks in exchange for Chris Wagner on February 26, 2018.

While with the Capitals, Chimera was nicknamed “the Ice Cheetah” for his speed on the ice.

== Career statistics ==
=== Regular season and playoffs ===
			Regular season					Playoffs
Season	Team	League	GP	G	A	Pts	PIM	GP	G	A	Pts	PIM
1996–97	Medicine Hat Tigers	WHL	71	16	23	39	64	4	0	1	1	4
1997–98	Medicine Hat Tigers	WHL	72	34	32	66	93	—	—	—	—	—
1997–98	Hamilton Bulldogs	AHL	4	0	0	0	8	—	—	—	—	—
1998–99	Medicine Hat Tigers	WHL	37	18	22	40	84	—	—	—	—	—
1998–99	Brandon Wheat Kings	WHL	21	14	12	26	32	5	4	1	5	8
1999–00	Hamilton Bulldogs	AHL	78	15	13	28	77	10	0	2	2	12
2000–01	Hamilton Bulldogs	AHL	78	29	25	54	93	—	—	—	—	—
2000–01	Edmonton Oilers	NHL	1	0	0	0	0	—	—	—	—	—
2001–02	Edmonton Oilers	NHL	3	1	0	1	0	—	—	—	—	—
2001–02	Hamilton Bulldogs	AHL	78	29	25	54	93	15	4	6	10	10
2002–03	Edmonton Oilers	NHL	66	14	9	23	36	2	0	2	2	0
2003–04	Edmonton Oilers	NHL	60	4	8	12	57	—	—	—	—	—
2004–05	Mastini Varese	ITA	15	7	3	10	34	5	2	1	3	31
2005–06	Columbus Blue Jackets	NHL	80	17	13	30	95	—	—	—	—	—
2006–07	Columbus Blue Jackets	NHL	82	15	21	36	91	—	—	—	—	—
2007–08	Columbus Blue Jackets	NHL	81	14	17	31	98	—	—	—	—	—
2008–09	Columbus Blue Jackets	NHL	49	8	14	22	41	4	0	1	1	2
2009–10	Columbus Blue Jackets	NHL	39	8	9	17	47	—	—	—	—	—
2009–10	Washington Capitals	NHL	39	7	10	17	51	7	1	2	3	2
2010–11	Washington Capitals	NHL	81	10	16	26	64	9	2	2	4	2
2011–12	Washington Capitals	NHL	82	20	19	39	78	14	4	3	7	6
2012–13	Piráti Chomutov	ELH	5	1	0	1	10	—	—	—	—	—
2012–13	Washington Capitals	NHL	47	3	11	14	48	7	1	2	3	4
2013–14	Washington Capitals	NHL	82	15	27	42	36	—	—	—	—	—
2014–15	Washington Capitals	NHL	77	7	12	19	51	14	3	4	7	4
2015–16	Washington Capitals	NHL	82	20	20	40	22	12	1	1	2	12
2016–17	New York Islanders	NHL	82	20	13	33	40	—	—	—	—	—
2017–18	New York Islanders	NHL	58	2	9	11	35	—	—	—	—	—
2017–18	Anaheim Ducks	NHL	16	1	1	2	2	2	0	0	0	0
NHL totals			1,107	186	229	415	892	71	12	17	29	32

=== International ===
Medal record

Representing Canada

Ice hockey

World Championships
Gold medal – first place	2007 Moscow	
Silver medal – second place	2008 Halifax/Quebec City	

World Junior Championships
Silver medal – second place	1999 Winnipeg	

Year	Team	Event	Result	GP	G	A	Pts	PIM
1999	Canada	WJC	2nd place, silver medalist(s)	7	2	2	4	2
2007	Canada	WC	1st place, gold medalist(s)	9	1	5	6	8
2008	Canada	WC	2nd place, silver medalist(s)	9	0	2	2	6
2014	Canada	WC	5th	8	1	2	3	0
Junior totals				7	2	2	4	2
Senior totals				26	2	9	11	14
