= Scott Walker (ice hockey) =

Canadian ice hockey player (born 1973)

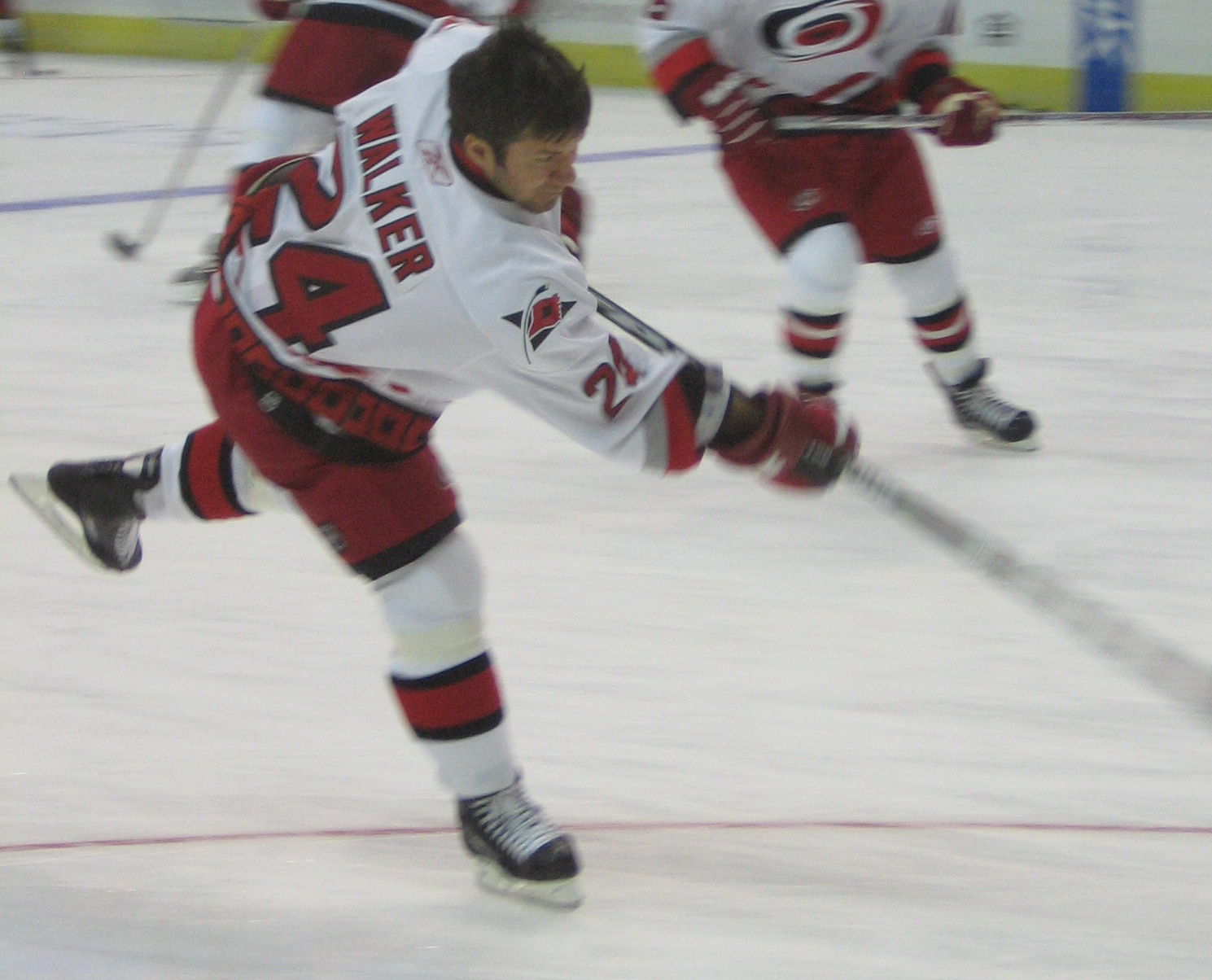
- Walker with the Carolina Hurricanes in 2007
- Born: July 19, 1973 (age 53) Cambridge, Ontario, Canada
- Height: 5 ft 10 in (178 cm)
- Weight: 196 lb (89 kg; 14 st 0 lb)
- Position: Defence (1993–96); Right wing (1996–2010)
- Shot: Right
- Played for: Vancouver Canucks; Nashville Predators; Carolina Hurricanes; Washington Capitals
- Coached for: Guelph Storm; Vancouver Canucks
- National team: Canada
- NHL draft: 124th overall, 1993; Vancouver Canucks
- Playing career: 1993–2010
- Coaching career: 2010–2022

Scott Walker (born July 19, 1973) is a Canadian former professional ice hockey player who currently serves as the co-owner and team president of the Guelph Storm in the OHL. He previously held the position of player development consultant for the Vancouver Canucks.

During his 17 seasons as a professional hockey player, Walker played in 829 regular season games in the National Hockey League (NHL) where he scored 397 points and earned 1,135 minutes in penalties before retiring as a player following the 2009–10 NHL season. He also competed in three Ice Hockey World Championships (1999, 2001, and 2005) as a member of Team Canada.

== Playing career ==
=== Owen Sound Platers (1991–1993) ===
Walker joined the Owen Sound Platers of the OHL in the 1991–92, after spending two seasons playing with the Kitchener Dutchmen and Cambridge Winterhawks of the OHA Junior 'B' league from 1989 to 1991. In his first season with the Platers, Walker had seven goals and 38 points in 53 games, helping Owen Sound reach the playoffs. In five playoff games, Walker earned seven assists to lead the club in points.

Walker returned to the Platers in 1992–93, as he finished third in team scoring with 23 goals and 91 points in 57 games, while earning 110 penalty minutes. In eight playoff games, Walker had a goal and six points.

At the 1993 NHL entry draft, the Vancouver Canucks selected Walker in the 5th round, 124th overall.

=== Vancouver Canucks (1993–1998) ===
Walker spent the 1993–94 season with the Vancouver Canucks AHL affiliate, the Hamilton Canucks. In 77 games with Hamilton, Walker had 10 goals and 39 points, as well as 272 PIM, helping the club reach the post-season. In four playoff games, Walker had an assist and 25 PIM.

In 1994–95, Walker moved with the team to Syracuse, as the Canucks shifted their AHL affiliate and became the Syracuse Crunch. In 74 games with the Crunch, Walker had 14 goals and 52 points to finish fourth in team scoring, while accumulating 334 PIM, as the club failed to qualify for the playoffs. Walker also made his NHL debut with the Vancouver Canucks during the 1994–95 season, as on April 13, 1995, Walker appeared in his first NHL game, going pointless, while earning four penalty minutes and a +1 rating in the Canucks 6–4 loss to the Edmonton Oilers. On April 17, 1995, Walker earned his first NHL point, an assist, during the Canucks 2–2 tie with the Dallas Stars. Overall, Walker played in 11 games with Vancouver, earning an assist and 33 PIM.

Walker began the 1995–96 with Vancouver, and on October 14, 1995, he scored his first career NHL goal against Wade Flaherty of the San Jose Sharks in the Canucks' 7–6 victory. Overall, Walker had four goals and 12 points in 63 games with the Canucks before finishing the season with the Syracuse Crunch. In 15 games with the Crunch, Walker had three goals and 15 points, helping the club reach the playoffs. In the post-season, Walker had nine goals and 17 points in 16 games. He was the first player to fight in the then newly opened General Motors Place.

Walker transitioned from defence to forward and spent the entire season in 1996–97 with the Canucks, appearing in 64 games, scoring three goals and 18 points, while earning 132 PIM, however, the club failed to reach the playoffs.

In 1997–98, Walker played in 59 games with Vancouver, scoring three goals and 13 points, while setting a career high with 164 PIM. The Canucks once again failed to qualify for the post-season.

On June 26, 1998, the Nashville Predators claimed Walker in the 1998 NHL Expansion Draft.

=== Nashville Predators (1998–2006) ===
Walker joined the Nashville Predators for their first season in 1998–99, as he appeared in 71 games with the club, scoring 15 goals and 40 points to finish fifth in team scoring.

Walker saw his offensive production slip during the 1999–2000 season, as in 69 games, Walker had seven goals and 28 points, which was eight goals and 12 points fewer than the previous season.

He rebounded in a big way during the 2000–01 season, as Walker scored a team high 25 goals, and finished second on the Predators with 54 points in 74 games.

Walker had an injury plagued season in 2001–02, playing in just 28 games, scoring four goals and nine points. On November 13, 2001, he suffered a concussion against the Buffalo Sabres, as the injury would cause Walker to end his season early in January.

Walker returned from his concussion problems in the 2002–03, playing in 60 games, scoring 15 goals and 33 points with the Predators. Walker served as the Predators interim captain when Greg Johnson was injured in January.

Walker had a career best season in 2003–04, as in 75 games, Walker tied his career high with 25 goals, and earned 42 assists for a career high 67 points to lead the club offensively, helping Nashville reach the post-season for the first time in team history, and for the first time in Walker's career. Walker played in 589 career games before making the playoffs, which at the time was the second longest wait in NHL history. Guy Charron retired in 1981 after 734 games, before he ever played a single playoff game. On December 27, 2003, Walker scored the first ever goal at Jobing.com Arena in Glendale, Arizona, scoring against Sean Burke of the Phoenix Coyotes in the Predators 3–1 victory.

Walker appeared in his first NHL playoff game on April 7, 2004, as he was held pointless in a 3–1 loss to the Detroit Red Wings. On April 13, 2004, Walker earned his first career playoff point, an assist, in the Predators 3–0 win over the Red Wings. Overall, Walker appeared in six playoff games, earning an assist.

With the 2004–05 NHL lockout cancelling the season, Walker spent some time with the Cambridge Hornets and Dundas Real McCoy's of the OHA-Sr. League.

Walker returned to the Predators for the 2005–06 season, however, a sports hernia suffered against the Chicago Blackhawks on October 25, 2005, and a wrist injury against the Dallas Stars on February 6, 2006, limited his playing time. In 33 games, Walker had five goals and 16 points, as the Predators made the playoffs for the second straight season. In five post-season games, Walker was held pointless.

Walker's time with the Predators came to an end on July 18, 2006, as Nashville traded him to the Carolina Hurricanes for Josef Vasicek.

=== Carolina Hurricanes (2006–2010) ===
Walker joined the defending Stanley Cup champion Carolina Hurricanes for the 2006–07 season, and in his first season with the club, Walker scored 21 goals and 51 points in a career high 81 games, however, the Hurricanes failed to qualify for the playoffs.

Injuries to his torso and knee cut into Walker's playing time in 2007–08, as he scored 14 goals and 32 points in 58 games, however, the Hurricanes missed the playoffs for the second straight season.

Walker had another injury plagued season in 2008–09, as a head injury and post-concussion symptoms caused him to appear in only 41 games, scoring five goals and 15 points, helping Carolina reach the playoffs. On May 14, 2009, Walker scored his first career playoff goal, the series clinching overtime goal against Tim Thomas of the Boston Bruins, helping Carolina reach the Eastern Conference finals. Overall, Walker appeared in 18 playoff games, scoring one goal and seven points.

Walker began the 2009–10 season with the Hurricanes, however, a shoulder injury limited his playing time to only 33 games, as he scored three goals and five points. On March 3, 2010, the Hurricanes traded Walker to the Washington Capitals for the Capitals' seventh round draft pick in the 2010 NHL entry draft.

=== Washington Capitals (2010) ===
Walker finished the 2009–10 season with the Washington Capitals, appearing in nine games, scoring two goals and three points, as the club reached the playoffs. Walker appeared in just one playoff game with Washington due to a knee injury, as he was held pointless.

Walker became a free agent after the season, and officially announced his retirement as a player on December 21, 2010.

Overall, Walker played in 829 career games, scoring 151 goals, 246 assists and 397 points, while accumulating 1162 penalty minutes. In 30 career playoff games, Walker had a goal and eight points, as well as 31 PIM.

== Coaching career ==
=== Guelph Storm (2010–2015) ===
On December 23, 2010, the Ontario Hockey League's Guelph Storm announced that Walker had been named as the team's new head coach.

Under Walker, the Storm went 19-13-2, helping the club reach the playoffs during the 2010–11 season. In the playoffs, Guelph lost in six games to the Saginaw Spirit in the first round.

Walker led a rebuilding Storm team into the playoffs once again in the 2011–12 season, as Guelph finished the season with a 31-31-6 record, earning 68 points. The club once again lost in the first round of the playoffs, losing in six games to the Plymouth Whalers.

In 2012–13, the Storm improved to a 39-23-6 record, earning 84 points, and fifth place in the Western Conference. In the first round of the playoffs, Guelph lost to their rivals, the Kitchener Rangers, in five games.

Walker resigned as the head coach on January 13, 2015, citing personal reasons. He remains part-owner of the franchise.

=== Vancouver Canucks (2015-17) ===
Walker was hired by the Vancouver Canucks as a player development consultant on October 2, 2015. His position entails working directly with Canucks prospects.

=== Canadian National Team (2017-18) ===
On July 25, 2017, he was named an assistant coach of Canada's men's team for the 2018 Winter Olympics in Pyeongchang, Korea.

=== Vancouver Canucks (2018-19) ===
Walker returned to the Vancouver Canucks for the 2018-19, working as the director of player development.

=== Arizona Coyotes (2019-21) ===
Walker joined the Arizona Coyotes as a special assistant to the general manager of the team, John Chayka for the 2019-20 season. In 2020-21, Walker remained with the team as the director of player personnel following the hire of new general manager Bill Armstrong.

=== Vancouver Canucks (2021-22) ===
On December 5, 2021, Walker was named an assistant coach with the Vancouver Canucks under new head coach Bruce Boudreau. Under Boudreau, the Canucks went 32-15-10, however, the club failed to qualify for the post-season with an overall record of 40-30-12 in the 2021-22 season.

=== Guelph Storm (2022-present) ===
Walker was named as head coach of the Guelph Storm on June 10, 2022. He was previously the head coach of the club from 2010 to 2015. On October 4, 2022, Walker stepped down as head coach of the team due to health concerns. Walker remained with the club as team president.

== Personal life ==
Walker is married to Julie and has 2 children, son Cooper (born on July 11, 2002) and daughter Anna (born on April 19, 2004).

== Awards ==
- Named to the OHL Second All-Star Team in 1993.
- Member of the Owen Sound Platers' MasterCard All-Time Team.
- NHL's Offensive Player of the Week for December 22–28, 2003.

== Career statistics ==
=== Regular season and playoffs ===
			Regular season					Playoffs
Season	Team	League	GP	G	A	Pts	PIM	GP	G	A	Pts	PIM
1989–90	Kitchener Dutchmen	MWJHL	6	0	5	5	4	—	—	—	—	—
1989–90	Cambridge Winter Hawks	MWJHL	27	7	22	29	87	—	—	—	—	—
1990–91	Cambridge Winter Hawks	MWJHL	45	10	27	37	241	—	—	—	—	—
1991–92	Owen Sound Platers	OHL	53	7	31	38	128	5	0	7	7	8
1992–93	Owen Sound Platers	OHL	57	23	68	91	110	8	1	5	6	16
1992–93	Canada	Intl	2	3	0	3	0	—	—	—	—	—
1993–94	Hamilton Canucks	AHL	77	10	29	39	272	4	0	1	1	25
1994–95	Syracuse Crunch	AHL	74	14	38	52	334	—	—	—	—	—
1994–95	Vancouver Canucks	NHL	11	0	1	1	33	—	—	—	—	—
1995–96	Syracuse Crunch	AHL	15	3	12	15	52	16	9	8	17	39
1995–96	Vancouver Canucks	NHL	63	4	8	12	137	—	—	—	—	—
1996–97	Vancouver Canucks	NHL	64	3	15	18	132	—	—	—	—	—
1997–98	Vancouver Canucks	NHL	59	3	10	13	164	—	—	—	—	—
1998–99	Nashville Predators	NHL	71	15	25	40	103	—	—	—	—	—
1999–00	Nashville Predators	NHL	69	7	21	28	90	—	—	—	—	—
2000–01	Nashville Predators	NHL	74	25	29	54	66	—	—	—	—	—
2001–02	Nashville Predators	NHL	28	4	5	9	18	—	—	—	—	—
2002–03	Nashville Predators	NHL	60	15	18	33	58	—	—	—	—	—
2003–04	Nashville Predators	NHL	75	25	42	67	94	6	0	1	1	6
2004–05	Cambridge Hornets	MLH	5	2	6	8	4	—	—	—	—	—
2004–05	Dundas Real McCoys	MLH	3	3	2	5	8	—	—	—	—	—
2005–06	Nashville Predators	NHL	33	5	11	16	36	5	0	0	0	6
2006–07	Carolina Hurricanes	NHL	81	21	30	51	45	—	—	—	—	—
2007–08	Carolina Hurricanes	NHL	58	14	18	32	115	—	—	—	—	—
2008–09	Carolina Hurricanes	NHL	41	5	10	15	39	18	1	6	7	19
2009–10	Carolina Hurricanes	NHL	33	3	2	5	23	—	—	—	—	—
2009–10	Washington Capitals	NHL	9	2	1	3	9	1	0	0	0	0
NHL totals			829	151	246	397	1,162	30	1	7	8	31

=== International ===
Year	Team	Event	GP	G	A	Pts	PIM
1999	Canada	WC	10	2	3	5	16
2001	Canada	WC	7	3	3	6	10
2005	Canada	WC	9	0	0	0	4
Senior totals			26	5	6	11	30

== Transactions ==
- June 26, 1998 – Claimed by Nashville (NHL) from Vancouver (NHL) in Expansion Draft.
- October 21, 2004 – Signed as a free agent by Cambridge (OHA senior).
- February 10, 2005 – Signed as a free agent by Dundas (OHA senior).
- July 18, 2006 – Traded to Carolina (NHL) by Nashville (NHL) for Josef Vasicek.
- March 3, 2010 – Traded to Washington (NHL) by Carolina (NHL) for 7th round Pick.

== Coaching record ==
Team	Year	Regular season					Postseason		
Team	Year	W	L	OTL	PTS	Finish	W	L	Result
Guelph Storm	2010-11	19	13	2	40	4th in Midwest	2	4	Lost in conference quarter-finals (2-4 vs. SAG)
Guelph Storm	2011-12	31	31	6	68	4th in Midwest	2	4	Lost in conference quarter-finals (2-4 vs. PLY)
Guelph Storm	2012-13	39	23	6	84	4th in Midwest	1	4	Lost in conference quarter-finals (1-4 vs. KIT)
Guelph Storm	2013-14	52	12	4	104	1st in Midwest	16	4	Won in conference quarter-finals (4-1 vs. PLY); Won in conference semi-finals (4-1 vs. LDN); Won in conference finals (4-1 vs. ERI); Won J. Ross Robertson Cup finals (4-1 vs. NB); Finished 1st in round-robin at Memorial Cup (3-0); Lost Memorial Cup final (3-6 vs. EDM)
Guelph Storm	2014-15	23	15	3	49	Resigned	-	-	
Guelph Storm	2022-23	0	1	1	1	Resigned	-	-	
Total		164	95	22	350	1 Division; Championships	21; 3	16; 1	1 J. Ross Robertson Cup; 0 Memorial Cups
