= 2009–10 Boston Bruins season =

NHL team season

2009–10 Boston Bruins
- Division: 3rd Northeast
- Conference: 6th Eastern
- 2009–10 record: 39–30–13
- Home record: 18–17–6
- Road record: 21–13–7
- Goals for: 206
- Goals against: 200

Team information
- General manager: Peter Chiarelli
- Coach: Claude Julien
- Captain: Zdeno Chara
- Alternate captains: Patrice Bergeron; Marco Sturm (Oct. 1 – Nov. 5, Apr. 11); Steve Begin (Nov.7 – Dec.10); Marc Savard (Dec. 12 – Jan. 7, Mar. 4); Mark Recchi (Jan. 5 – Apr.11); Derek Morris (Jan. 9 – Feb. 9); Mark Stuart (Mar. 9); David Krejci (Apr. 11); Milan Lucic (Apr. 11)
- Arena: TD Garden; Fenway Park (1 game)
- Average attendance: 17,388 (99.0%); Total: 695,543

Team leaders
- Goals: Marco Sturm (22)
- Assists: Zdeno Chara (37)
- Points: Patrice Bergeron (52); David Krejci (52)
- Penalty minutes: Shawn Thornton (141)
- Plus/minus: Zdeno Chara (+19)
- Wins: Tuukka Rask (22)
- Goals against average: Tuukka Rask (1.97)

The 2009–10 Boston Bruins season was the Bruins' 86th season in the National Hockey League (NHL). Their regular season began with a nationally-televised home game against the Washington Capitals on October 1, 2009, and ended with a road game against the same Capitals team on April 11, 2010. The Bruins failed to defend their regular-season division and conference titles from the 2008–09 season.

== Off-season ==
At the 2009 NHL entry draft, the Bruins chose Jordan Caron with their first-round pick, 25th overall. The NHL announced on July 15, 2009, that the Bruins would face the Philadelphia Flyers in the 2010 NHL Winter Classic on New Year's Day at Fenway Park.

Due to salary cap constraints and free agent movement, general manager Peter Chiarelli made substantial changes to the Bruins' lineup in the offseason. Most notable was the trade of leading goalscorer Phil Kessel, who declined contract offers and was traded to the Toronto Maple Leafs for three draft picks on September 18. Other departures included winger P. J. Axelsson—at 11 seasons, the longest tenured Bruin—center Stephane Yelle, defensemen Shane Hnidy and Steve Montador, and goaltender Manny Fernandez. These veteran players were considered expendable because of competition from younger, lower-paid players in the Bruins organization.

Chiarelli entered the 2009 off-season to acquire an offensive-minded defenseman, in part because of Boston's weakness in that area during the previous playoffs. On July 24, defenseman Derek Morris signed a one-year contract with the team. Gritty forward Steve Begin was also signed to provide forward depth. In goal, Fernandez was replaced with rookie Tuukka Rask, who had spent several seasons playing in the American Hockey League (AHL).

== Pre-season ==
2009 pre-season game log: 5–2–1 (home: 1–2–0; road: 4–0–1)
#	Date	Visitor	Score	Home	OT	Decision	Attendance	Record	Recap
1	September 15	Boston Bruins	2–1	New York Rangers		Tuukka Rask	11,111	1–0–0
2	September 16	Boston Bruins	3–2	Toronto Maple Leafs		Dany Sabourin	16,872	2–0–0
3	September 19	New York Rangers	5–2	Boston Bruins		Tim Thomas	15,882	2–1–0
4	September 20	Montreal Canadiens	1–2	Boston Bruins^{1}		Tuukka Rask	15,399	3–1–0
5	September 22	Boston Bruins	5–6	Columbus Blue Jackets	SO	Dany Sabourin	10,571	3–1–1
6	September 24	Boston Bruins	2–1	Montreal Canadiens	SO	Tim Thomas	21,273	4–1–1
7	September 25	Boston Bruins	2–1	Ottawa Senators		Tim Thomas	18,295	5–1–1
8	September 26	Columbus Blue Jackets	4–2	Boston Bruins		Tuukka Rask	16,711	5–2–1
Match played at Colisée Pepsi, Quebec City.

== Regular season ==
The Bruins were slow to gain traction with their retooled roster, alternating wins and losses in the early weeks of the season. Chiarelli quickly dealt popular winger Chuck Kobasew to the Minnesota Wild, while penalty-killing expert Daniel Paille was brought in from the Buffalo Sabres in exchange for draft picks, a move that was interpreted as a sign of dissatisfaction with the team's productivity.

In particular, the team struggled offensively in Kessel's absence. Having nearly finished first in scoring the previous season, the Bruins lingered near the bottom of the league in goal production. However, they remained competitive due to their exceptional defense and strong goaltending tandem. While defending Vezina Trophy winner Tim Thomas was recovering from an early injury, rookie netminder Tuukka Rask emerged as a potential Calder Memorial Trophy candidate. A four-game winning streak in November set the Bruins back on course, and a 5–1–0 home record in December got them back into the divisional race by Christmas.

Perhaps the most memorable game of the season was the Winter Classic, which the Bruins hosted at Fenway Park in Boston. Despite trailing for most of the game, the team rallied in the final moments and won in overtime before a large national audience. After the game, Thomas was announced as a member of the United States men's hockey team, joining five teammates (Patrice Bergeron, Zdeno Chara, Marco Sturm, David Krejci and Miroslav Satan) who would represent various countries in Vancouver.

The Bruins went on a long losing streak lasting from mid-January to just before the Olympic break.

In the 81st game of the season, the Bruins scored three shorthanded goals in a span of 64 seconds. This outburst during a single penalty kill not only equaled their previous shorthanded goal total for the entire season but also set an NHL record for the fastest three shorthanded goals in a game. The 4–2 victory over the Hurricanes secured a playoff spot for the Bruins.

The Bruins finished the regular season having scored 196 goals (excluding 10 shootout-winning goals), the fewest in the NHL. They were the most disciplined team in the League, with a league-low 37 power-play goals against.

=== Divisional standings ===
Northeast Division
		GP	W	L	OTL	GF	GA	Pts
**1**	**y – Buffalo Sabres**	**82**	**45**	**27**	**10**	**235**	**207**	**100**
**2**	**Ottawa Senators**	**82**	**44**	**32**	**6**	**225**	**238**	**94**
**3**	**Boston Bruins**	**82**	**39**	**30**	**13**	**206**	**200**	**91**
**4**	**Montreal Canadiens**	**82**	**39**	**33**	**10**	**217**	**223**	**88**
5	Toronto Maple Leafs	82	30	38	14	214	263	74

=== Conference standings ===
Eastern Conference
R		Div	GP	W	L	OTL	GF	GA	Pts
**1**	**p – Washington Capitals**	**SE**	**82**	**54**	**15**	**13**	**318**	**233**	121
**2**	**y – New Jersey Devils**	**AT**	**82**	**48**	**27**	**7**	**222**	**191**	103
**3**	**y – Buffalo Sabres**	**NE**	**82**	**45**	**27**	**10**	**235**	**207**	100
**4**	**Pittsburgh Penguins**	**AT**	**82**	**47**	**28**	**7**	**257**	**237**	101
**5**	**Ottawa Senators**	**NE**	**82**	**44**	**32**	**6**	**225**	**238**	94
**6**	**Boston Bruins**	**NE**	**82**	**39**	**30**	**13**	**206**	**200**	91
**7**	**Philadelphia Flyers**	**AT**	**82**	**41**	**35**	**6**	**236**	**225**	88
**8**	**Montreal Canadiens**	**NE**	**82**	**39**	**33**	**10**	**217**	**223**	88
8.5
9	New York Rangers	AT	82	38	33	11	222	218	87
10	Atlanta Thrashers	SE	82	35	34	13	234	256	83
11	Carolina Hurricanes	SE	82	35	37	10	230	256	80
12	Tampa Bay Lightning	SE	82	34	36	12	217	260	80
13	New York Islanders	AT	82	34	37	11	222	264	79
14	Florida Panthers	SE	82	32	37	13	208	244	77
15	Toronto Maple Leafs	NE	82	30	38	14	214	267	74

bold – Qualified for playoffs; y – Won division; p – Won Presidents' Trophy (and division)

AT – Atlantic Division, NE – Northeast Division, SE – Southeast Division

=== Game log ===
2009–10 game log

October: 6–5–1 (home: 4–4–0; road: 2–1–1)
#	**Date**	**Visitor**	**Score**	**Home**	**OT**	**Decision**	**Attendance**	**Record**	**Pts**	**Recap**
1	October 1	Washington Capitals	4–1	Boston Bruins		Tim Thomas	17,565	0–1–0	0
2	October 3	Carolina Hurricanes	2–7	Boston Bruins		Tim Thomas	16,592	1–1–0	2
3	October 8	Anaheim Ducks	6–1	Boston Bruins		Tim Thomas	16,158	1–2–0	2
4	October 10	New York Islanders	3–4	Boston Bruins	SO	Tuukka Rask	17,113	2–2–0	4
5	October 12	Colorado Avalanche	4–3	Boston Bruins		Tuukka Rask	16,393	2–3–0	4
6	October 16	Boston Bruins	3–0	Dallas Stars		Tim Thomas	17,811	3–3–0	6
7	October 17	Boston Bruins	1–4	Phoenix Coyotes		Tim Thomas	9,162	3–4–0	6
8	October 21	Nashville Predators	2–3	Boston Bruins		Tim Thomas	16,715	4–4–0	8
9	October 22	Boston Bruins	3–4	Philadelphia Flyers	SO	Tuukka Rask	19,303	4–4–1	9
10	October 24	Boston Bruins	4–3	Ottawa Senators	SO	Tim Thomas	20,154	5–4–1	11
11	October 29	New Jersey Devils	2–1	Boston Bruins		Tim Thomas	17,565	5–5–1	11
12	October 31	Edmonton Oilers	0–2	Boston Bruins		Tuukka Rask	17,565	6–5–1	13

November: 7–3–4 (home: 3–1–3; road: 4–2–1)
#	**Date**	**Visitor**	**Score**	**Home**	**OT**	**Decision**	**Attendance**	**Record**	**Pts**	**Recap**
13	November 1	Boston Bruins	0–1	New York Rangers		Tim Thomas	18,200	6–6–1	13
14	November 3	Boston Bruins	0–2	Detroit Red Wings		Tim Thomas	19,167	6–7–1	13
15	November 5	Montreal Canadiens	2–1	Boston Bruins	SO	Tim Thomas	17,565	6–7–2	14
16	November 7	Buffalo Sabres	2–4	Boston Bruins		Tuukka Rask	17,565	7–7–2	16
17	November 10	Pittsburgh Penguins	0–3	Boston Bruins		Tim Thomas	17,565	8–7–2	18
18	November 12	Florida Panthers	1–0	Boston Bruins	SO	Tim Thomas	17,074	8–7–3	19
19	November 14	Boston Bruins	5–6	Pittsburgh Penguins	OT	Tim Thomas	17,132	8–7–4	20
20	November 16	New York Islanders	4–1	Boston Bruins		Tuukka Rask	16,865	8–8–4	20
21	November 19	Boston Bruins	4–3	Atlanta Thrashers	SO	Tuukka Rask	12,112	9–8–4	22
22	November 20	Boston Bruins	2–1	Buffalo Sabres	OT	Tuukka Rask	18,291	10–8–4	24
23	November 23	Boston Bruins	4–2	St. Louis Blues		Tuukka Rask	19,150	11–8–4	26
24	November 25	Boston Bruins	2–1	Minnesota Wild	SO	Tuukka Rask	18,208	12–8–4	28
25	November 27	New Jersey Devils	2–1	Boston Bruins	SO	Tuukka Rask	17,565	12–8–5	29
26	November 28	Ottawa Senators	3–4	Boston Bruins	SO	Tim Thomas	17,565	13–8–5	31

December: 7–4–2 (home: 5–1–0; road: 2–3–2)
#	**Date**	**Visitor**	**Score**	**Home**	**OT**	**Decision**	**Attendance**	**Record**	**Pts**	**Recap**
27	December 2	Tampa Bay Lightning	1–4	Boston Bruins		Tim Thomas	16,553	14–8–5	33
28	December 4	Boston Bruins	1–5	Montreal Canadiens		Tim Thomas	21,273	14–9–5	33
29	December 5	Toronto Maple Leafs	2–7	Boston Bruins		Tuukka Rask	17,565	15–9–5	35
30	December 10	Toronto Maple Leafs	2–5	Boston Bruins		Tuukka Rask	17,565	16–9–5	37
31	December 12	Boston Bruins	2–3	New York Islanders	OT	Tim Thomas	13,744	16–9–6	38
32	December 14	Philadelphia Flyers	3–1	Boston Bruins		Tim Thomas	17,565	16–10–6	38
33	December 18	Boston Bruins	4–5	Chicago Blackhawks	SO	Tim Thomas	21,717	16–10–7	39
34	December 19	Boston Bruins	0–3	Toronto Maple Leafs		Tuukka Rask	19,101	16–11–7	39
35	December 21	Boston Bruins	2–0	Ottawa Senators		Tim Thomas	19,865	17–11–7	41
36	December 23	Atlanta Thrashers	4–6	Boston Bruins		Tim Thomas	17,565	18–11–7	43
37	December 27	Boston Bruins	2–1	Florida Panthers		Tim Thomas	18,799	19–11–7	45
38	December 28	Boston Bruins	1–2	Tampa Bay Lightning		Tim Thomas	16,926	19–12–7	45
39	December 30	Atlanta Thrashers	0–4	Boston Bruins		Tuukka Rask	17,565	20–12–7	47

January: 3–9–2 (home: 1–5–1; road: 2–4–1)
#	**Date**	**Visitor**	**Score**	**Home**	**OT**	**Decision**	**Attendance**	**Record**	**Pts**	**Recap**
40	January 1^{1}	Philadelphia Flyers	1–2	**Boston Bruins**	OT	Tim Thomas	38,112	21–12–7	49
41	January 4	Boston Bruins	2–3	New York Rangers		Tuukka Rask	18,200	21–13–7	49
42	January 5	Boston Bruins	4–1	Ottawa Senators		Tim Thomas	19,156	22–13–7	51
43	January 7	Chicago Blackhawks	5–2	Boston Bruins		Tim Thomas	17,565	22–14–7	51
44	January 9	New York Rangers	3–1	Boston Bruins		Tim Thomas	17,565	22–15–7	51
45	January 13	Boston Bruins	3–4	Anaheim Ducks		Tuukka Rask	14,957	22–16–7	51
46	January 14	Boston Bruins	2–1	San Jose Sharks	SO	Tim Thomas	17,562	23–16–7	53
47	January 16	Boston Bruins	3–4	Los Angeles Kings	SO	Tim Thomas	18,118	23–16–8	54
48	January 18	Ottawa Senators	5–1	Boston Bruins		Tim Thomas	17,565	23–17–8	54
49	January 21	Columbus Blue Jackets	3–2	Boston Bruins		Tuukka Rask	17,565	23–18–8	54
50	January 23	Ottawa Senators	2–1	Boston Bruins		Tim Thomas	17,565	23–19–8	54
51	January 24	Boston Bruins	1–5	Carolina Hurricanes		Tim Thomas	13,512	23–20–8	54
52	January 29	Boston Bruins	1–2	Buffalo Sabres		Tuukka Rask	18,690	23–21–8	54
53	January 30	Los Angeles Kings	3–2	Boston Bruins	SO	Tim Thomas	17,565	23–21–9	55
2010 NHL Winter Classic, played at Fenway Park.

February: 4–1–2 (home: 0–1–2; road: 4–0–0)
#	**Date**	**Visitor**	**Score**	**Home**	**OT**	**Decision**	**Attendance**	**Record**	**Pts**	**Recap**
54	February 2	Washington Capitals	4–1	Boston Bruins		Tim Thomas	17,565	23–22–9	55
55	February 4	Montreal Canadiens	3–2	Boston Bruins	SO	Tuukka Rask	17,565	23–22–10	56
56	February 6	Vancouver Canucks	3–2	Boston Bruins	SO	Tuukka Rask	17,565	23–22–11	57
57	February 7	Boston Bruins	3–0	Montreal Canadiens		Tuukka Rask	21,273	24–22–11	59
58	February 9	Boston Bruins	3–2	Buffalo Sabres	SO	Tuukka Rask	18,690	25–22–11	61
59	February 11	Boston Bruins	5–4	Tampa Bay Lightning		Tuukka Rask	15,826	26–22–11	63
60	February 13	Boston Bruins	3–2	Florida Panthers	SO	Tuukka Rask	17,109	27–22–11	65

March: 8–7–1 (home: 3–4–0; road: 5–3–1)
#	**Date**	**Visitor**	**Score**	**Home**	**OT**	**Decision**	**Attendance**	**Record**	**Pts**	**Recap**
61	March 2	Montreal Canadiens	4–1	Boston Bruins		Tuukka Rask	17,565	27–23–11	65
62	March 4	Toronto Maple Leafs	2–3	Boston Bruins	SO	Tim Thomas	17,565	28–23–11	67
63	March 6	Boston Bruins	3–2	New York Islanders		Tim Thomas	14,587	29–23–11	69
64	March 7	Boston Bruins	1–2	Pittsburgh Penguins		Tim Thomas	17,132	29–24–11	69
65	March 9	Boston Bruins	3–4	Toronto Maple Leafs	OT	Tim Thomas	19,499	29–24–12	70
66	March 11	Boston Bruins	5–1	Philadelphia Flyers		Tuukka Rask	19,673	30–24–12	72
67	March 13	Boston Bruins	2–3	Montreal Canadiens		Tuukka Rask	21,273	30–25–12	72
68	March 15	Boston Bruins	2–3	New Jersey Devils		Tim Thomas	15,801	30–26–12	72
69	March 16	Boston Bruins	5–2	Carolina Hurricanes		Tuukka Rask	15,832	31–26–12	74
70	March 18	Pittsburgh Penguins	3–0	Boston Bruins		Tuukka Rask	17,565	31–27–12	74
71	March 21	New York Rangers	1–2	Boston Bruins		Tuukka Rask	17,565	32–27–12	76
72	March 23	Boston Bruins	4–0	Atlanta Thrashers		Tuukka Rask	14,042	33–27–12	78
73	March 25	Tampa Bay Lightning	5–3	Boston Bruins		Tuukka Rask	17,565	33–28–12	78
74	March 27	Calgary Flames	0–5	Boston Bruins		Tim Thomas	17,565	34–28–12	80
75	March 29	Buffalo Sabres	3–2	Boston Bruins		Tim Thomas	17,565	34–29–12	80
76	March 30	Boston Bruins	1–0	New Jersey Devils	OT	Tuukka Rask	16,636	35–29–12	82

April: 4–1–1 (home: 2–1–0; road: 2–0–1)
#	**Date**	**Visitor**	**Score**	**Home**	**OT**	**Decision**	**Attendance**	**Record**	**Pts**	**Recap**
77	April 1	Florida Panthers	1–0	Boston Bruins		Tuukka Rask	17,565	35–30–12	82
78	April 3	Boston Bruins	2–1	Toronto Maple Leafs	OT	Tuukka Rask	19,273	36–30–12	84
79	April 5	Boston Bruins	2–3	Washington Capitals	OT	Tuukka Rask	18,277	36–30–13	85
80	April 8	Buffalo Sabres	1–3	Boston Bruins		Tuukka Rask	17,565	37–30–13	87
81	April 10	Carolina Hurricanes	2–4	Boston Bruins		Tuukka Rask	17,565	38–30–13	89
82	April 11	Boston Bruins	4–3	Washington Capitals	SO	Tim Thomas	18,277	39–30–13	91

== Playoffs ==
The Bruins clinched a playoff spot for the third consecutive season.

=== Playoff log ===
2010 Stanley Cup playoffs

Eastern Conference quarterfinals vs E3 Buffalo Sabres: 4–2 (home: 3–0; road: 1–2)
#	Date	Visitor	Score	Home	OT	Boston goals	Buffalo goals	Decision	Attendance	Series	Recap
1	April 15	Boston Bruins	1–2	Buffalo Sabres		Recchi	Vanek, Rivet	Rask	18,690	0–1
2	April 17	Boston Bruins	5–3	Buffalo Sabres		Ryder (2), Chara (2), Recchi	Myers, Ellis, Pominville	Rask	18,690	1–1
3	April 19	Buffalo Sabres	1–2	Boston Bruins		Wideman, Bergeron	Grier	Rask	17,565	2–1
4	April 21	Buffalo Sabres	2–3	Boston Bruins	27:41	Krejci, Bergeron, Satan	Kennedy, Montador	Rask	17,565	3–1
5	April 23	Boston Bruins	1–4	Buffalo Sabres		Boychuk	Mair, Pominville, Grier, Ennis	Rask	18,690	3–2
6	April 26	Buffalo Sabres	3–4	Boston Bruins		Krejci (2), Recchi, Satan	Kaleta, Gerbe, Vanek	Rask	17,565	4–2

Eastern Conference semifinals vs E7 Philadelphia Flyers: 3–4 (home: 2–2; road: 1–2)
#	Date	Visitor	Score	Home	OT	Boston goals	Philadelphia goals	Decision	Attendance	Series	Recap
1	May 1	Philadelphia Flyers	4–5	Boston Bruins	13:52	Begin, Bergeron, Satan, Krejci, Savard	Parent, Pronger, Richards, Briere	Rask	17,565	1–0
2	May 3	Philadelphia Flyers	2–3	Boston Bruins		Boychuk, Satan, Lucic	Richards, Briere	Rask	17,565	2–0
3	May 5	Boston Bruins	4–1	Philadelphia Flyers		Wheeler, Satan, Recchi, Bergeron	Asham	Rask	19,688	3–0
4	May 7	Boston Bruins	4–5	Philadelphia Flyers	14:40	Recchi (2), Ryder, Lucic	Briere, Pronger, Giroux, Leino, Gagne	Rask	19,702	3–1
5	May 10	Philadelphia Flyers	4–0	Boston Bruins			Leino, Hartnell, Gagne (2)	Rask	17,565	3–2
6	May 12	Boston Bruins	1–2	Philadelphia Flyers		Lucic	Richards, Briere	Rask	19,929	3–3
7	May 14	Philadelphia Flyers	4–3	Boston Bruins		Ryder, Lucic (2)	van Riemsdyk, Hartnell, Briere, Gagne	Rask	17,565	3–4

- Scorer of game-winning goal in italics
- *Denotes if necessary

== Player statistics ==
=== Skaters ===
Note: GP = Games played; G = Goals; A = Assists; Pts = Points; +/- = Plus–minus; PIM = Penalty minutes

Regular season

Player	GP	G	A	Pts	+/-	PIM
Patrice Bergeron	73	19	33	52	6	28
David Krejci	79	17	35	52	8	26
Zdeno Chara	80	7	37	44	19	87
Mark Recchi	81	18	25	43	4	34
Blake Wheeler	82	18	20	38	-4	53
Marco Sturm	76	22	15	37	14	30
Marc Savard	41	10	23	33	2	14
Michael Ryder	82	18	15	33	3	35
Dennis Wideman	76	6	24	30	-14	34
Derek Morris^{‡}	58	3	22	25	-2	26
Milan Lucic	50	9	11	20	-7	44
Daniel Paille^{†}	74	10	9	19	-4	12
Johnny Boychuk	51	5	10	15	10	43
Miroslav Satan	38	9	5	14	8	12
Steve Begin	77	5	9	14	-7	53
Matt Hunwick	76	6	8	14	-16	32
Shawn Thornton	74	1	9	10	-9	141
Vladimir Sobotka	61	4	6	10	-7	30
Byron Bitz^{‡}	45	4	5	9	-9	31
Dennis Seidenberg^{†}	17	2	6	8	9	6
Andrew Ference	51	0	8	8	-7	16
Mark Stuart	56	2	5	7	1	80
Tuukka Rask^{(G)}	45	0	3	3	—	2
Trent Whitfield	16	0	1	1	-2	7
Adam McQuaid	19	1	0	1	-5	21
Brad Marchand	20	0	1	1	-3	20
Zach Hamill	1	0	1	1	1	0
Chuck Kobasew^{‡}	7	0	1	1	-2	2
Guillaume Lefebvre	1	0	0	0	0	0
Drew Larman	4	0	0	0	-1	0
Andy Wozniewski	2	0	0	0	0	0
Mikko Lehtonen	1	0	0	0	-1	0
Andrew Bodnarchuk	5	0	0	0	-2	2
Jeff Penner	2	0	0	0	0	0
Tim Thomas^{(G)}	43	0	0	0	—	8
Totals	—	196	347	543	-2	929

- ^{†}Denotes player spent time with another team before joining Bruins. Stats reflect time with the Bruins only.
- ^{‡}Denotes player was traded mid-season.
- ^{(G)}Denotes goaltender.

Playoffs

Player	GP	G	A	Pts	+/-	PIM
Dennis Wideman	13	1	11	12	3	4
Patrice Bergeron	13	4	7	11	4	2
Mark Recchi	13	6	4	10	0	6
Miroslav Satan	13	5	5	10	4	16
Milan Lucic	13	5	4	9	1	19
David Krejci	9	4	4	8	3	2
Zdeno Chara	13	2	5	7	1	29
Johnny Boychuk	13	2	4	6	0	6
Blake Wheeler	13	1	5	6	-6	6
Matt Hunwick	13	0	6	6	-1	2
Michael Ryder	13	4	1	5	-4	2
Marc Savard	7	1	2	3	2	12
Daniel Paille	13	0	2	2	-2	2
Vladimir Sobotka	13	0	2	2	-10	15
Steve Begin	13	1	0	1	-7	10
Andrew Ference	13	0	1	1	-9	18
Tuukka Rask^{(G)}	13	0	1	1	—	0
Marco Sturm	7	0	0	0	0	4
Shawn Thornton	12	0	0	0	-4	4
Adam McQuaid	9	0	0	0	-4	6
Trent Whitfield	4	0	0	0	-1	0
Mark Stuart	4	0	0	0	-4	6
Totals	—	36	63	99	-7	167

=== Goaltenders ===
Note: GPI = Games Played In; MIN = Minutes played; GAA = Goals against average; W = Wins; L = Losses; OT = Overtime/shootout losses; SO = Shutouts; SA = Shots Against; GA = Goals against; SV% = Save percentage

Regular season

Player	GPI	MIN	GAA	W	L	OT	SO	SA	GA	SV%
Tuukka Rask	45	2562	1.97	22	12	5	5	1221	84	.931
Tim Thomas	43	2442	2.56	17	18	8	5	1221	104	.915
Combined	—	5004	2.25	39	30	13	10	2442	188	.923

Playoffs

Player	GPI	MIN	GAA	W	L	OT	SO	SA	GA	SV%
Tuukka Rask	13	829	2.61	7	6	—	0	409	36	.912

== Awards and records ==
=== Awards ===
Regular season
Player	Award	Date
Tuukka Rask	NHL Third Star of the Week	April 5, 2010
Mark Recchi	Bill Masterton Memorial Trophy nominee	Nominated by the Writers' Association for league-wide recognition.

On April 8, before the game against the Buffalo Sabres, the team announced its award winners for the season.

Bruins annual awards
Player	Award	Notes
Tuukka Rask	NESN Seventh Player Award	Awarded to the player who exceeded the expectations of Bruins fans during the season.
Mark Recchi	Eddie Shore Award	Awarded to the player who exhibits exceptional hustle and determination.
Patrice Bergeron	Elizabeth C. Dufresne Trophy	Awarded by the Boston Chapter of the PHWA, for outstanding performance during home games.
Shawn Thornton	John P. Bucyk Award	Awarded to the Bruin with the greatest off-ice charitable contributions.
Patrice Bergeron; David Krejci; Tuukka Rask	Three Star Awards	Awarded to the top performers at home over the course of the season.

=== Milestones ===
Regular season
Player	Milestone	Reached
Brad Marchand	1st career NHL game 1st career NHL assist 1st career NHL point	October 21, 2009
Mark Recchi	1,500th career NHL game	October 24, 2009
Mark Recchi	900th career NHL assist	November 10, 2009
Shawn Thornton	400th career NHL PIM	November 16, 2009
Tuukka Rask	1st career NHL assist 1st career NHL point	November 20, 2009
Marc Savard	200th career NHL goal	December 2, 2009
Johnny Boychuk	1st career NHL goal 1st career NHL point	December 5, 2009
Johnny Boychuk	1st career NHL assist	December 10, 2009
Adam McQuaid	1st career NHL game	December 19, 2009
Vladimir Sobotka	100th career NHL game	December 23, 2009
Matt Hunwick	100th career NHL game	December 27, 2009
Adam McQuaid	1st career NHL goal 1st career NHL point	February 7, 2010
Jeffrey Penner	1st career NHL game	March 9, 2010
David Krejci	100th career NHL assist	March 25, 2010
Steve Begin	100th career NHL point	April 10, 2010
Zach Hamill	1st career NHL game 1st career NHL assist 1st career NHL point	April 11, 2010

On December 23, Claude Julien coached his 200th game for Boston, a 6–4 win over Atlanta.

== Transactions ==
The Bruins have been involved in the following transactions during the 2009–10 season.

Trades

July 24, 2009	To Carolina Hurricanes: Aaron Ward	To Boston: Patrick Eaves; 4th-round pick in 2010
September 18, 2009	To Toronto Maple Leafs: Phil Kessel	To Boston: 1st-round pick in 2010; 1st-round pick in 2011; 2nd-round pick in 2010
October 18, 2009	To Minnesota Wild: Chuck Kobasew	To Boston: Alexander Fallstrom; Craig Weller; 2nd-round pick in 2011
October 20, 2009	To Buffalo Sabres: 3rd-round pick in 2010; Conditional 4th-round pick in 2010 (Note: Condition not satisfied.)	To Boston: Daniel Paille
March 2, 2010	To Anaheim Ducks: Conditional 4th-round draft pick in 2010 (Note: Condition satisfied.)	To Boston: Steven Kampfer
March 2, 2010	To Edmonton Oilers: Matt Marquardt	To Boston: Cody Wild
March 3, 2010	To Phoenix Coyotes: Derek Morris	To Boston: Conditional pick in 2011 (Note: Condition satisfied.)
March 3, 2010	To Florida Panthers: Byron Bitz; Craig Weller; 2nd-round draft pick in 2010	To Boston: Dennis Seidenberg; Matt Bartkowski

Free agents acquired

Player	Former team	Contract terms
Steve Begin	Dallas Stars	1 year, $850,000
Drew Fata	Binghamton Senators	1 year
Dany Sabourin	Edmonton Oilers	1 year
Rob Kwiet	Windsor Spitfires	1 year
Drew Larman	Rochester Americans	1 year
Zach McKelvie	United States Military Academy	1 year
Trent Whitfield	St. Louis Blues	2 years, 2-way contract
Derek Morris	New York Rangers	1 year, $3.3 million
Andy Wozniewski	Wilkes-Barre Penguins	1 year
Guillaume Lefebvre	Springfield Falcons	1 year
Miroslav Satan	Pittsburgh Penguins	1 year, $700,000

Free agents lost

Player	New team	Contract terms
Steve Montador	Buffalo Sabres	2 years, $3.1 million
Shane Hnidy	Minnesota Wild	1 year, $750,000
Martin St. Pierre	Ottawa Senators	1 year, 2-way contract
P. J. Axelsson	Frolunda HC	4 years
Patrick Eaves	Detroit Red Wings	1 year, $500,000
Stephane Yelle	Carolina Hurricanes	1 year, $550,000

Player signings

Player	Contract terms
Jamie Arniel	undisclosed
David Krejci	3 years, $11.25 million
Byron Bitz	1 year, $675,000
Johnny Boychuk	1 year
Mark Recchi	1 year, $1 million
Matt Hunwick	2 years, $2.9 million
Milan Lucic	3 years, $12.25 million
Tuukka Rask	2 years, $2.5 million
Marc Savard	7 years, $28 million
Andrew Ference	3 years, $6.75 million contract extension
Jordan Caron	entry-level contract
Joe Colborne	entry-level contract
Michael Hutchinson	entry-level contract
Steven Kampfer	entry-level contract
Matt Bartkowski	entry-level contract

== Draft picks ==
Boston's picks at the 2009 NHL entry draft in Montreal, Quebec.

Round	#	Player	Position	Nationality	College/junior/club team (league)
1	25	Jordan Caron	Right wing	Canada	Rimouski Oceanic (QMJHL)
3	86	Ryan Button	Defense	Canada	Prince Albert Raiders (WHL)
4	112 (from Philadelphia)	Lane MacDermid	Forward	United States	Windsor Spitfires (OHL)
6	176	Tyler Randell	Right wing	Canada	Kitchener Rangers (OHL)
7	206	Ben Sexton	Center	Canada	Nepean Raiders (CJAHL)

== Farm teams ==
American Hockey League – Providence Bruins (standings)

== See also ==
- 2009–10 NHL season
