= 2009–10 NHL transactions =

List of NHL team-to-team transactions during the 2009-10 season

The following is a list of all team-to-team transactions that have occurred in the National Hockey League during the 2009–10 NHL season. It lists what team each player has been traded to, signed by, or claimed by, and for which player(s) or draft pick(s), if applicable.

The 2009–10 NHL trade deadline was on March 3, 2010. Players traded or claimed off waivers after that date were not be eligible to play in the 2010 Stanley Cup playoffs.

== Retirement ==
Date	Team	Name
July 8, 2009	Claude Lemieux	San Jose Sharks
July 9, 2009	Chad Kilger	Florida Panthers
July 9, 2009	Joe Sakic	Colorado Avalanche
August 4, 2009	Teppo Numminen	Buffalo Sabres
August 6, 2009	Jeremy Roenick	San Jose Sharks
September 2, 2009	Jason Smith	Ottawa Senators
September 3, 2009	Philippe Boucher	Pittsburgh Penguins
September 14, 2009	Keith Carney	Vancouver Canucks
September 17, 2009	Kevin Weekes	New Jersey Devils
September 23, 2009	Olaf Kolzig	Toronto Maple Leafs
September 24, 2009	Patrice Brisebois	Montreal Canadiens
September 25, 2009	Bret Hedican	Anaheim Ducks
September 26, 2009	Brad Isbister	Ottawa Senators
September 26, 2009	Mike Sillinger	New York Islanders
September 28, 2009	Theoren Fleury	Calgary Flames
September 30, 2009	Mats Sundin	Vancouver Canucks
October 1, 2009	Rhett Warrener	Calgary Flames
November 17, 2009	Brendan Shanahan	New Jersey Devils
December 7, 2009	Darren McCarty	Detroit Red Wings
January 12, 2010	Curtis Joseph	Toronto Maple Leafs
January 19, 2010	Michael Peca	Columbus Blue Jackets
April 13, 2010	Keith Tkachuk	St. Louis Blues
May 8, 2010	Rory Fitzpatrick	Florida Panthers
June 18, 2010	Rob Blake	San Jose Sharks
June 22, 2010	Scott Niedermayer	Anaheim Ducks
June 30, 2010	Rod Brind'Amour	Carolina Hurricanes

== Free agency ==
Note: This does not include players who have re-signed with their previous team as an Unrestricted Free Agent or as a Restricted Free Agent.

Date	Player	New team	Previous team
July 1, 2009	Mattias Ohlund	Tampa Bay Lightning	Vancouver Canucks
July 1, 2009	Colton Orr	Toronto Maple Leafs	New York Rangers
July 1, 2009	Craig Anderson	Colorado Avalanche	Florida Panthers
July 1, 2009	Marian Hossa	Chicago Blackhawks	Detroit Red Wings
July 1, 2009	Matt Walker	Tampa Bay Lightning	Chicago Blackhawks
July 1, 2009	Ty Conklin	St. Louis Blues	Detroit Red Wings
July 1, 2009	Dwayne Roloson	New York Islanders	Edmonton Oilers
July 1, 2009	Tomas Kopecky	Chicago Blackhawks	Detroit Red Wings
July 1, 2009	Steve Montador	Buffalo Sabres	Boston Bruins
July 1, 2009	Ville Koistinen	Florida Panthers	Nashville Predators
July 1, 2009	Donald Brashear	New York Rangers	Washington Capitals
July 1, 2009	Mike Knuble	Washington Capitals	Philadelphia Flyers
July 1, 2009	Aaron Rome	Vancouver Canucks	Columbus Blue Jackets
July 1, 2009	Brian Boucher	Philadelphia Flyers	San Jose Sharks
July 1, 2009	Jaroslav Spacek	Montreal Canadiens	Buffalo Sabres
July 1, 2009	Martin St. Pierre	Ottawa Senators	Boston Bruins
July 1, 2009	Nikolai Khabibulin	Edmonton Oilers	Chicago Blackhawks
July 1, 2009	Scott Clemmensen	Florida Panthers	New Jersey Devils
July 1, 2009	Ian Laperriere	Philadelphia Flyers	Colorado Avalanche
July 1, 2009	Hal Gill	Montreal Canadiens	Pittsburgh Penguins
July 1, 2009	Michael Rupp	Pittsburgh Penguins	New Jersey Devils
July 1, 2009	David Koci	Colorado Avalanche	Tampa Bay Lightning
July 1, 2009	Mike Cammalleri	Montreal Canadiens	Calgary Flames
July 1, 2009	Greg Zanon	Minnesota Wild	Nashville Predators
July 1, 2009	Vernon Fiddler	Phoenix Coyotes	Nashville Predators
July 1, 2009	Mike Komisarek	Toronto Maple Leafs	Montreal Canadiens
July 1, 2009	Steve Begin	Boston Bruins	Dallas Stars
July 1, 2009	Samuel Pahlsson	Columbus Blue Jackets	Chicago Blackhawks
July 1, 2009	Mathieu Darche	Montreal Canadiens	Buffalo Sabres
July 1, 2009	Mathieu Garon	Columbus Blue Jackets	Pittsburgh Penguins
July 1, 2009	Brian Gionta	Montreal Canadiens	New Jersey Devils
July 1, 2009	Marian Gaborik	New York Rangers	Minnesota Wild
July 1, 2009	Fredrik Sjostrom	Calgary Flames	New York Rangers
July 1, 2009	Jason LaBarbera	Phoenix Coyotes	Vancouver Canucks
July 1, 2009	John Madden	Chicago Blackhawks	New Jersey Devils
July 1, 2009	Martin Havlat	Minnesota Wild	Chicago Blackhawks
July 1, 2009	Mike Brodeur	Ottawa Senators	Chicago Blackhawks
July 2, 2009	Nik Antropov	Atlanta Thrashers	New York Rangers
July 2, 2009	Adrian Aucoin	Phoenix Coyotes	Calgary Flames
July 2, 2009	Garth Murray	Calgary Flames	Phoenix Coyotes
July 2, 2009	Riley Armstrong	Calgary Flames	San Jose Sharks
July 2, 2009	Scott Munroe	New York Islanders	Philadelphia Flyers
July 2, 2009	Jeremy Reich	New York Islanders	Boston Bruins
July 2, 2009	Brett Westgarth	New York Islanders	San Jose Sharks
July 2, 2009	Karlis Skrastins	Dallas Stars	Florida Panthers
July 2, 2009	Rob Scuderi	Los Angeles Kings	Pittsburgh Penguins
July 2, 2009	Lawrence Nycholat	Vancouver Canucks	Colorado Avalanche
July 2, 2009	Clay Wilson	Florida Panthers	Atlanta Thrashers
July 2, 2009	Staffan Kronwall	Calgary Flames	Washington Capitals
July 3, 2009	Jay Rosehill	Toronto Maple Leafs	Tampa Bay Lightning
July 3, 2009	Nate Guenin	Pittsburgh Penguins	Philadelphia Flyers
July 3, 2009	Tyler Arnason	New York Rangers	Colorado Avalanche
July 3, 2009	Corey Locke	New York Rangers	Minnesota Wild
July 3, 2009	Mikael Samuelsson	Vancouver Canucks	Detroit Red Wings
July 3, 2009	Jason Krog	Atlanta Thrashers	Vancouver Canucks
July 3, 2009	Shane Hnidy	Minnesota Wild	Boston Bruins
July 4, 2009	Drew MacIntyre	Atlanta Thrashers	Nashville Predators
July 4, 2009	Chris Minard	Edmonton Oilers	Pittsburgh Penguins
July 4, 2009	Jeff Taffe	Florida Panthers	Pittsburgh Penguins
July 4, 2009	Mark Flood	New York Islanders	Carolina Hurricanes
July 4, 2009	Greg Mauldin	New York Islanders	Ottawa Senators
July 4, 2009	Tim Brent	Toronto Maple Leafs	Chicago Blackhawks
July 4, 2009	Tanner Glass	Vancouver Canucks	Florida Panthers
July 4, 2009	Pascal Pelletier	Columbus Blue Jackets	Chicago Blackhawks
July 5, 2009	Chris Conner	Pittsburgh Penguins	Dallas Stars
July 5, 2009	Chris Lee	Pittsburgh Penguins	New York Islanders
July 5, 2009	Jason Jaffray	Calgary Flames	Vancouver Canucks
July 5, 2009	Peter Mannino	Atlanta Thrashers	New York Islanders
July 6, 2009	Alexei Kovalev	Ottawa Senators	Montreal Canadiens
July 6, 2009	Darren Haydar	Colorado Avalanche	Detroit Red Wings
July 6, 2009	Francois Beauchemin	Toronto Maple Leafs	Anaheim Ducks
July 6, 2009	Andrew Raycroft	Vancouver Canucks	Colorado Avalanche
July 6, 2009	Matt Moulson	New York Islanders	Los Angeles Kings
July 6, 2009	Warren Peters	Dallas Stars	Calgary Flames
July 6, 2009	Jeremy Williams	Detroit Red Wings	Toronto Maple Leafs
July 6, 2009	Kris Newbury	Detroit Red Wings	Toronto Maple Leafs
July 6, 2009	Greg Moore	New York Islanders	New York Rangers
July 7, 2009	Stephane Veilleux	Tampa Bay Lightning	Minnesota Wild
July 7, 2009	Jeff Woywitka	Dallas Stars	St. Louis Blues
July 7, 2009	Dany Sabourin	Boston Bruins	Edmonton Oilers
July 7, 2009	Drew Fata	Boston Bruins	Ottawa Senators
July 7, 2009	Michael Funk	Vancouver Canucks	Buffalo Sabres
July 8, 2009	Saku Koivu	Anaheim Ducks	Montreal Canadiens
July 8, 2009	Steven Goertzen	Carolina Hurricanes	Phoenix Coyotes
July 8, 2009	Doug Janik	Detroit Red Wings	New York Rangers
July 8, 2009	Jaime Sifers	Minnesota Wild	Toronto Maple Leafs
July 8, 2009	Jamie Fraser	Minnesota Wild	New York Islanders
July 8, 2009	Kurtis Foster	Tampa Bay Lightning	Minnesota Wild
July 8, 2009	Brett Skinner	Colorado Avalanche	New York Islanders
July 8, 2009	Joey Mormina	Philadelphia Flyers	Pittsburgh Penguins
July 9, 2009	Nick Boynton	Anaheim Ducks	Florida Panthers
July 9, 2009	Ales Kotalik	New York Rangers	Edmonton Oilers
July 9, 2009	Jay Harrison	Carolina Hurricanes	Toronto Maple Leafs
July 9, 2009	Richard Petiot	Chicago Blackhawks	Tampa Bay Lightning
July 9, 2009	Jay McKee	Pittsburgh Penguins	St. Louis Blues
July 10, 2009	Antero Niittymaki	Tampa Bay Lightning	Philadelphia Flyers
July 10, 2009	Geoff Kinrade	Ottawa Senators	Tampa Bay Lightning
July 10, 2009	Graham Mink	Florida Panthers	Washington Capitals
July 10, 2009	Paul Mara	Montreal Canadiens	New York Rangers
July 10, 2009	Travis Moen	Montreal Canadiens	San Jose Sharks
July 10, 2009	Yann Danis	New Jersey Devils	New York Islanders
July 10, 2009	Brendan Morrison	Washington Capitals	Dallas Stars
July 10, 2009	Mathieu Roy	Columbus Blue Jackets	Edmonton Oilers
July 11, 2009	Brian McGrattan	Calgary Flames	Phoenix Coyotes
July 11, 2009	Boyd Kane	Washington Capitals	Philadelphia Flyers
July 11, 2009	Joe Callahan	San Jose Sharks	New York Islanders
July 12, 2009	Mark Cullen	Chicago Blackhawks	Vancouver Canucks
July 13, 2009	Brandon Segal	Los Angeles Kings	Tampa Bay Lightning
July 13, 2009	Dean Arsene	Edmonton Oilers	Washington Capitals
July 13, 2009	Noah Welch	Atlanta Thrashers	Tampa Bay Lightning
July 13, 2009	Anthony Stewart	Atlanta Thrashers	Florida Panthers
July 13, 2009	Drew Larman	Boston Bruins	Florida Panthers
July 13, 2009	Trent Whitfield	Boston Bruins	St. Louis Blues
July 14, 2009	Ben Guite	Nashville Predators	Colorado Avalanche
July 14, 2009	Tom Kostopoulos	Carolina Hurricanes	Montreal Canadiens
July 15, 2009	Krystofer Kolanos	Philadelphia Flyers	Minnesota Wild
July 15, 2009	Scott Nichol	San Jose Sharks	Nashville Predators
July 15, 2009	Zack Fitzgerald	Carolina Hurricanes	Vancouver Canucks
July 15, 2009	Andrew Alberts	Carolina Hurricanes	Philadelphia Flyers
July 16, 2009	Peter Olvecky	Nashville Predators	Minnesota Wild
July 16, 2009	Jed Ortmeyer	San Jose Sharks	Nashville Predators
July 16, 2009	Dwight Helminen	San Jose Sharks	Carolina Hurricanes
July 16, 2009	Danny Groulx	San Jose Sharks	Chicago Blackhawks
July 16, 2009	Jon DiSalvatore	Minnesota Wild	New Jersey Devils
July 16, 2009	Barry Tallackson	St. Louis Blues	New Jersey Devils
July 16, 2009	Adam Cracknell	St. Louis Blues	Calgary Flames
July 17, 2009	Cory Murphy	New Jersey Devils	Tampa Bay Lightning
July 17, 2009	Wade Dubielewicz	Minnesota Wild	Columbus Blue Jackets
July 17, 2009	Duncan Milroy	Minnesota Wild	Montreal Canadiens
July 18, 2009	Jason Ward	Philadelphia Flyers	Tampa Bay Lightning
July 20, 2009	Danny Bois	Chicago Blackhawks	Ottawa Senators
July 20, 2009	Curtis Sanford	Montreal Canadiens	Vancouver Canucks
July 20, 2009	Justin Fletcher	St. Louis Blues	Tampa Bay Lightning
July 21, 2009	Lukas Kaspar	Philadelphia Flyers	San Jose Sharks
July 21, 2009	Brent Johnson	Pittsburgh Penguins	Washington Capitals
July 22, 2009	Martin Biron	New York Islanders	Philadelphia Flyers
July 22, 2009	Nathan Smith	Minnesota Wild	Colorado Avalanche
July 23, 2009	Ryan Lannon	Minnesota Wild	Phoenix Coyotes
July 24, 2009	Derek Morris	Boston Bruins	New York Rangers
July 24, 2009	Bryce Lampman	St. Louis Blues	Dallas Stars
July 30, 2009	Ole-Kristian Tollefsen	Philadelphia Flyers	Columbus Blue Jackets
July 30, 2009	Josh Gratton	Atlanta Thrashers	Philadelphia Flyers
July 30, 2009	Michael Vernace	Atlanta Thrashers	Colorado Avalanche
July 31, 2009	Wyatt Smith	Pittsburgh Penguins	Phoenix Coyotes
July 31, 2009	Wade Brookbank	Pittsburgh Penguins	Tampa Bay Lightning
July 31, 2009	Brendan Bell	St. Louis Blues	Ottawa Senators
July 31, 2009	Rob Davison	New Jersey Devils	Vancouver Canucks
August 1, 2009	Cody McCormick	Buffalo Sabres	Colorado Avalanche
August 4, 2009	Patrick Eaves	Detroit Red Wings	Carolina Hurricanes
August 6, 2009	Jason Williams	Detroit Red Wings	Columbus Blue Jackets
August 10, 2009	Joey MacDonald	Toronto Maple Leafs	New York Islanders
August 11, 2009	Mike Grier	Buffalo Sabres	San Jose Sharks
August 12, 2009	Brad Larsen	Buffalo Sabres	Anaheim Ducks
August 16, 2009	Vaclav Prospal	New York Rangers	Tampa Bay Lightning
August 18, 2009	Todd Bertuzzi	Detroit Red Wings	Calgary Flames
August 19, 2009	Stephane Yelle	Carolina Hurricanes	Boston Bruins
August 20, 2009	Jeff Cowan	Buffalo Sabres	Vancouver Canucks
August 20, 2009	Marcel Goc	Nashville Predators	San Jose Sharks
August 28, 2009	Mathieu Schneider	Vancouver Canucks	Montreal Canadiens
August 28, 2009	Alex Tanguay	Tampa Bay Lightning	Montreal Canadiens
September 2, 2009	Taylor Pyatt	Phoenix Coyotes	Vancouver Canucks
September 4, 2009	Steve Eminger	Anaheim Ducks	Florida Panthers
September 8, 2009	Derek Armstrong	St. Louis Blues	Los Angeles Kings
September 9, 2009	Andy Wozniewski	Boston Bruins	Pittsburgh Penguins
September 10, 2009	Mike Comrie	Edmonton Oilers	Ottawa Senators
September 14, 2009	Dennis Seidenberg	Florida Panthers	Carolina Hurricanes
September 17, 2009	Petr Sykora	Minnesota Wild	Pittsburgh Penguins
September 21, 2009	Francis Bouillon	Nashville Predators	Montreal Canadiens
September 23, 2009	Manny Malhotra	San Jose Sharks	Columbus Blue Jackets
September 25, 2009	Rob Niedermayer	New Jersey Devils	Anaheim Ducks
September 25, 2009	Andrew Peters	New Jersey Devils	Buffalo Sabres
September 25, 2009	Darryl Sydor	St. Louis Blues	Dallas Stars
September 28, 2009	Ryan Bayda	Pittsburgh Penguins	Carolina Hurricanes
September 28, 2009	Ryan Hollweg	Phoenix Coyotes	Toronto Maple Leafs
September 29, 2009	Martin Skoula	Pittsburgh Penguins	Minnesota Wild
September 29, 2009	Maxim Afinogenov	Atlanta Thrashers	Buffalo Sabres
September 29, 2009	Robert Lang	Phoenix Coyotes	Montreal Canadiens
September 30, 2009	Alexei Semenov	New York Rangers	San Jose Sharks
September 30, 2009	Andy Hilbert	Minnesota Wild	New York Islanders
September 30, 2009	Mitch Fritz	Tampa Bay Lightning	New York Islanders
October 1, 2009	Blair Betts	Philadelphia Flyers	New York Rangers
October 5, 2009	Dominic Moore	Florida Panthers	Buffalo Sabres
October 6, 2009	Marc-Andre Bergeron	Montreal Canadiens	Minnesota Wild
October 7, 2009	Dave Scatchard	Nashville Predators	Phoenix Coyotes
October 7, 2009	Brad May	Detroit Red Wings	Toronto Maple Leafs
October 28, 2009	Kyle Calder	Anaheim Ducks	Los Angeles Kings
November 2, 2009	Matt Pettinger	Vancouver Canucks	Tampa Bay Lightning
November 6, 2009	Dean McAmmond	New Jersey Devils	New York Islanders
November 9, 2009	Manny Legace	Carolina Hurricanes	St. Louis Blues
December 21, 2009	Anders Eriksson	Phoenix Coyotes	Calgary Flames
January 2, 2010	Miroslav Satan	Boston Bruins	Pittsburgh Penguins
January 28, 2010	Trevor Gillies	New York Islanders	Carolina Hurricanes
January 30, 2010	Lukas Krajicek	Philadelphia Flyers	Tampa Bay Lightning
February 9, 2010	Mark Parrish	Tampa Bay Lightning	Dallas Stars
February 17, 2010	Jassen Cullimore	Chicago Blackhawks	Florida Panthers
March 2, 2010	Chris Chelios	Atlanta Thrashers	Detroit Red Wings
March 2, 2010	John Grahame	Colorado Avalanche	Carolina Hurricanes

== Trades ==
=== July ===
July 1, 2009	To Atlanta Thrashers Pavel Kubina; Tim Stapleton	To Toronto Maple Leafs Garnet Exelby; Colin Stuart
July 3, 2009	To Los Angeles Kings Ryan Smyth	To Colorado Avalanche Kyle Quincey; Tom Preissing; 5th-round pick in 2010 (#139 - Luke Walker)
July 8, 2009	To Dallas Stars Alex Auld	To Ottawa Senators 6th-round pick in 2010 (#178 - Mark Stone)
July 9, 2009	To New Jersey Devils Tim Sestito	To Edmonton Oilers conditional pick in 2010^{1}
July 13, 2009	To New York Rangers Enver Lisin	To Phoenix Coyotes Lauri Korpikoski
July 16, 2009	To Colorado Avalanche Brian Fahey	To New York Rangers Nigel Williams
July 17, 2009	To Calgary Flames Keith Seabrook	To Washington Capitals future considerations
July 21, 2009	To Phoenix Coyotes Radim Vrbata	To Tampa Bay Lightning Todd Fedoruk; David Hale
July 24, 2009	To Carolina Hurricanes Aaron Ward	To Boston Bruins Patrick Eaves; 4th-round pick in 2010 (#97 - Craig Cunningham)
July 27, 2009	To Toronto Maple Leafs Wayne Primeau; 2nd-round pick in 2011 (CHI - #43 - Brandon Saad)^{2}	To Calgary Flames Anton Stralman; Colin Stuart; 7th-round pick in 2012 (#186 - Matt DeBlouw)

1. The conditions of this pick are unknown. No selections were made from this trade.
2. Toronto's acquired second-round pick went to Chicago as the result of a trade on September 5, 2009, that sent a second-round pick in the 2010 entry draft to Toronto in exchange for a third-round pick in the 2011 entry draft entry draft and this pick.

=== August ===
August 10, 2009	To Anaheim Ducks Justin Pogge	To Toronto Maple Leafs conditional pick in 2011 (6th-round - #173 - Dennis Robertson)^{1}
August 13, 2009	To Anaheim Ducks Evgeny Artyukhin	To Tampa Bay Lightning Drew Miller; 3rd-round in 2010 (#72 - Adam Janosik)
August 28, 2009	To Vancouver Canucks Christian Ehrhoff; Brad Lukowich	To San Jose Sharks Patrick White; Daniel Rahimi
August 31, 2009	To Carolina Hurricanes Rob Hennigar	To New York Islanders Bobby Hughes

1. The conditions of this pick was a sixth-round pick, or as high as a third-round pick depending on how many games Pogge starts until the 2011 entry draft. Pogge did not have an NHL start in the 2009-10 NHL season or 2010-11 NHL season so the trade was finalize for a sixth-round pick in the 2011 entry draft.

=== September ===
September 4, 2009	To Anaheim Ducks Shawn Weller	To Ottawa Senators Jason Bailey
September 5, 2009	To Toronto Maple Leafs 2nd-round pick in 2010 (BOS - #32 - Jared Knight)^{1}	To Chicago Blackhawks 2nd-round pick in 2011 (#43 - Brandon Saad); 3rd-round pick in 2011 (#70 - Michael Paliotta)
September 12, 2009	To San Jose Sharks Dany Heatley; 5th-round pick in 2010 (#136 - Issac Macleod)	To Ottawa Senators Milan Michalek; Jonathan Cheechoo; 2nd-round pick in 2010 (CHI - #58 - Kent Simpson)^{2}
September 18, 2009	To Toronto Maple Leafs Phil Kessel	To Boston Bruins 1st-round pick in 2010 (#2 - Tyler Seguin); 2nd-round pick in 2010 (#32 - Jared Knight); 1st-round pick in 2011 (#9 - Dougie Hamilton)
September 24, 2009	To Atlanta Thrashers Steve McCarthy	To Anaheim Ducks future considerations
September 28, 2009	To Columbus Blue Jackets Anton Stralman	To Calgary Flames 3rd-round pick in 2010 (#64 - Maxwell Reinhart)

1. Toronto's second-round pick went to Boston as the result of a trade on September 18, 2009, that sent Phil Kessel to Toronto in exchange for first-round picks in the 2010 entry draft and the 2011 along with this pick.
2. The Islanders' acquired second-round pick went to Chicago as the result of a trade on June 25, 2010, that sent a first-round pick in the 2010 entry draft to the Islanders in exchange for a second-round pick (#35 overall) in the 2010 entry draft and this pick.
  The Islanders previously acquired the pick as the result of a trade on March 2, 2010, that sent Andy Sutton to Ottawa in exchange for this pick.

=== October ===
October 7, 2009	To Chicago Blackhawks Kyle Greentree	To Calgary Flames Aaron Johnson
October 8, 2009	To Columbus Blue Jackets Jordan Smotherman	To Atlanta Thrashers future considerations
October 18, 2009	To Minnesota Wild Chuck Kobasew	To Boston Bruins Craig Weller; Alexander Fallstrom; 2nd-round pick in 2011 (#40 - Alexander Khokhlachev)
October 20, 2009	To Philadelphia Flyers Stefan Legein	To Columbus Blue Jackets Mike Ratchuk
October 20, 2009	To Boston Bruins Daniel Paille	To Buffalo Sabres 3rd-round pick in 2010 (#75 - Kevin Sundher) conditional 4th-round pick in 2010^{1}

1. The condition was Buffalo would get a fourth-round pick if Paille scored 16 or more goals during the 2009–10 NHL season. The condition was not met as Paille score 10 goals.

=== November ===
November 23, 2009	To Minnesota Wild Guillaume Latendresse	To Montreal Canadiens Benoit Pouliot

=== December ===
December 2, 2009	To Anaheim Ducks Kyle Chipchura	To Montreal Canadiens 4th-round pick in 2011 (#113 - Magnus Nygren)
December 3, 2009	To Carolina Hurricanes Jiri Tlusty	To Toronto Maple Leafs Philippe Paradis
December 8, 2009	To St. Louis Blues Pascal Pelletier	To Columbus Blue Jackets Brendan Bell; Tomas Kana
December 28, 2009	To Washington Capitals Jason Chimera	To Columbus Blue Jackets Chris Clark; Milan Jurcina

=== January ===
January 31, 2010	To Toronto Maple Leafs Dion Phaneuf; Fredrik Sjostrom; Keith Aulie	To Calgary Flames Matt Stajan; Niklas Hagman; Jamal Mayers; Ian White
January 31, 2010	To Toronto Maple Leafs Jean-Sebastien Giguere	To Anaheim Ducks Vesa Toskala; Jason Blake

=== February ===
February 2, 2010	To New York Rangers Olli Jokinen; Brandon Prust	To Calgary Flames Ales Kotalik; Chris Higgins
February 4, 2010	To New Jersey Devils Ilya Kovalchuk; Anssi Salmela; 2nd-round pick in 2010 (#38 - Jonathon Merrill)	To Atlanta Thrashers Johnny Oduya; Niclas Bergfors; Patrice Cormier; 1st-round pick in 2010 (CHI - #24 - Kevin Hayes)^{1} 2nd-round pick in 2010 (CHI - #54 - Justin Holl)^{2}
February 6, 2010	To Philadelphia Flyers Ville Leino	To Detroit Red Wings Ole-Kristian Tollefsen; 5th-round pick in 2011 (#146 - Mattias Backman)
February 7, 2010	To Carolina Hurricanes 2nd-round pick in 2010 (#53 - Mark Alt)	To San Jose Sharks Niclas Wallin; 5th-round pick in 2010 (#127 - Cody Ferriero)
February 9, 2010	To Dallas Stars Kari Lehtonen	To Atlanta Thrashers Ivan Vishnevskiy; 4th-round pick in 2010 (#101 - Ivan Telegin)
February 11, 2010	To Montreal Canadiens Dominic Moore	To Florida Panthers 2nd-round pick in 2011 (SJS - #47 - Matt Nieto)^{3}
February 11, 2010	To Pittsburgh Penguins Steven Wagner	To St. Louis Blues Nate Guenin
February 12, 2010	To Ottawa Senators Matt Cullen	To Carolina Hurricanes Alexandre Picard; 2nd-round pick in 2010 (EDM - #46 - Martin Marincin)^{4}
February 12, 2010	To Minnesota Wild Cam Barker	To Chicago Blackhawks Kim Johnsson; Nick Leddy
February 12, 2010	To New York Rangers Jody Shelley	To San Jose Sharks conditional pick in 2011 (6th-round - #166 - Daniil Sobchenko)^{5}

1. Atlanta's acquired first-round pick went to Chicago as the result of a trade on June 24, 2010, that sent Dustin Byfuglien, Ben Eager, Brent Sopel and Akim Aliu to Atlanta in exchange for Marty Reasoner, Joey Crabb, Jeremy Morin, a second-round pick in the 2010 entry draft and this pick.
2. Atlanta's acquired second-round pick went to Chicago as the result of a trade on June 24, 2010, that sent Dustin Byfuglien, Ben Eager, Brent Sopel and Akim Aliu to Atlanta in exchange for Marty Reasoner, Joey Crabb, Jeremy Morin, a first-round pick in the 2010 entry draft and this pick.
3. Florida's acquired second-round pick went to the San Jose as the result of a trade on June 25, 2011, that sent a second-round pick (#59 overall) in the 2011 entry draft and a third-round pick in the 2012 entry draft to Florida in exchange for this pick.
4. Carolina's acquired second-round pick went to Edmonton as the result of a trade on June 26, 2010, that sent Riley Nash to Carolina in exchange for this pick.
5. The conditions of this pick was San Jose would receive a fifth-round pick if the Rangers re-signed Shelley and a sixth-round pick if he doesn't re-sign. The conditions of a sixth-round pick was met when Shelly signed with Philadelphia on July 1st, 2010.

=== March ===
March 1, 2010	To Atlanta Thrashers Evgeny Artyukhin	To Anaheim Ducks Nathan Oystrick conditional pick in 2011^{1}
March 1, 2010	To Nashville Predators Denis Grebeshkov	To Edmonton Oilers 2nd-round pick in 2010 (#48 - Curtis Hamilton)
March 1, 2010	To Pittsburgh Penguins Jordan Leopold	To Florida Panthers 2nd-round pick in 2010 (#50 - Connor Brickley)
March 1, 2010	To Columbus Blue Jackets Greg Moore	To New York Islanders Dylan Reese
March 1, 2010	To St. Louis Blues Joe Fallon	To Chicago Blackhawks Hannu Toivonen; Danny Richmond
March 2, 2010	To Ottawa Senators Andy Sutton	To New York Islanders 2nd-round pick in 2010 (CHI - #58 - Kent Simpson)^{2}
March 2, 2010	To Pittsburgh Penguins Alexei Ponikarovsky	To Toronto Maple Leafs Martin Skoula; Luca Caputi
March 2, 2010	To Edmonton Oilers Matt Marquardt	To Boston Bruins Cody Wild
March 2, 2010	To Chicago Blackhawks Nick Boynton	To Anaheim Ducks Future considerations
March 2, 2010	To Boston Bruins Steven Kampfer	To Anaheim Ducks conditional 4th-round pick in 2010 (CAR - #105 - Justin Shugg)^{3} or 2011^{4}
March 2, 2010	To St. Louis Blues Matt D'Agostini	To Montreal Canadiens Aaron Palushaj
March 3, 2010	To Washington Capitals Eric Belanger	To Minnesota Wild 2nd-round pick in 2010 (#56 - Johan Larsson)
March 3, 2010	To Atlanta Thrashers Clarke MacArthur	To Buffalo Sabres 3rd-round pick in 2010 (#68 - Jerome Gauthier-Leduc); 4th-round pick in 2010 (#98 - Steven Shipley)
March 3, 2010	To Buffalo Sabres Raffi Torres	To Columbus Blue Jackets Nathan Paetsch; 2nd-round pick in 2010 (#55 - Petr Straka)
March 3, 2010	To Calgary Flames Andy Delmore	To Detroit Red Wings Riley Armstrong
March 3, 2010	To New York Rangers Kris Newbury	To Detroit Red Wings Jordan Owens
March 3, 2010	To New York Rangers Anders Eriksson	To Phoenix Coyotes Miika Wiikman; 7th-round pick in 2011 (#196 - Zac Larraza)
March 3, 2010	To Nashville Predators Dustin Boyd	To Calgary Flames 4th-round pick in 2010 (#108 - Bill Arnold)
March 3, 2010	To Toronto Maple Leafs Chris Peluso	To Pittsburgh Penguins 6th-round pick in 2010 (#152 - Joe Rogalski)
March 3, 2010	To Florida Panthers Mathieu Roy	To Columbus Blue Jackets Matt Rust
March 3, 2010	To Boston Bruins Dennis Seidenberg; Matt Bartkowski	To Florida Panthers Craig Weller; Byron Bitz; 2nd-round pick in 2010 (#36 - Alexander Petrovic)
March 3, 2010	To Anaheim Ducks Lubomir Visnovsky	To Edmonton Oilers Ryan Whitney; 6th-round pick in 2010 (#162 - Brandon Davidson)
March 3, 2010	To Calgary Flames Steve Staios	To Edmonton Oilers Aaron Johnson; Flames choice of a 3rd-round pick in 2010 or 2011 entry draft (#74 - Travis Ewanyk)
March 3, 2010	To Phoenix Coyotes Lee Stempniak	To Toronto Maple Leafs Matt Jones; 4th-round pick in 2010 (WSH - #112 - Philipp Grubauer)^{1} 7th-round pick in 2010 (EDM - #202 - Kellen Jones)^{2}
March 3, 2010	To New Jersey Devils Martin Skoula	To Toronto Maple Leafs 5th-round pick in 2010 (#144 - Sam Carrick)
March 3, 2010	To Anaheim Ducks Joey MacDonald	To Toronto Maple Leafs 7th-round pick in 2011 (#203 - Max Everson)
March 3, 2010	To Los Angeles Kings Jeff Halpern	To Tampa Bay Lightning Teddy Purcell; 3rd-round pick in 2010 (#63 - Brock Beukeboom)
March 3, 2010	To Los Angeles Kings Fredrik Modin	To Columbus Blue Jackets conditional 7th-round pick in 2010^{3}
March 3, 2010	To Colorado Avalanche Stephane Yelle; Harrison Reed	To Carolina Hurricanes Cedric Lalonde-McNicoll; 6th-round pick in 2010 (#167 - Tyler Stahl)
March 3, 2010	To Vancouver Canucks Andrew Alberts	To Carolina Hurricanes 3rd-round pick in 2010 (#85 - Austin Levi)
March 3, 2010	To Washington Capitals Scott Walker	To Carolina Hurricanes 7th-round pick in 2010 (PHI - #206 - Ricard Blidstrand)^{4}
March 3, 2010	To Washington Capitals Joe Corvo	To Carolina Hurricanes Brian Pothier; Oskar Osala; 2nd-round pick in 2011 (CGY - #57 - Tyler Wotherspoon)^{5}
March 3, 2010	To Anaheim Ducks Aaron Ward	To Carolina Hurricanes Justin Pogge conditional 4th-round pick^{6} in 2010 (#105 - Justin Shugg) or 2011
March 3, 2010	To Calgary Flames Vesa Toskala	To Anaheim Ducks Curtis McElhinney
March 3, 2010	To Phoenix Coyotes Petteri Nokelainen	To Anaheim Ducks 6th-round pick in 2011 (OTT - #171 - Max McCormick)^{7}
March 3, 2010	To Phoenix Coyotes Wojtek Wolski	To Colorado Avalanche Peter Mueller; Kevin Porter
March 3, 2010	To Columbus Blue Jackets Chad Kolarik	To Phoenix Coyotes Alexandre Picard
March 3, 2010	To Phoenix Coyotes Derek Morris	To Boston Bruins conditional pick in 2011^{8} (3rd-round - #81 - Anthony Camara)
March 3, 2010	To Phoenix Coyotes Mathieu Schneider	To Vancouver Canucks Sean Zimmerman conditional 6th-round pick in 2010^{9} (#172 - Alex Friesen)
March 3, 2010	To Washington Capitals Milan Jurcina	To Columbus Blue Jackets conditional 6th-round pick in 2010^{10}
March 3, 2010	To Vancouver Canucks Yan Stastny	To St. Louis Blues Pierre-Cedric Labrie

1. The conditions of this pick was Atlanta would receive a sixth-round pick if Anaheim re-signed Artyukhin. The conditions was not met when Artyukhin signed with St. Petersburg of the KHL on November 2nd, 2010.
2. The Islanders' acquired second-round pick went to Chicago as the result of a trade on June 25, 2010, that sent a first-round pick in the 2010 entry draft to the Islanders in exchange for a second-round pick (#35 overall) in the 2010 entry draft and this pick.
3. Anaheim's acquired fourth-round pick went to Carolina as the result of a trade on March 3, 2010, that sent Aaron Ward to Anaheim in exchange for Justin Pogge and this pick (being conditional at the time of the trade). The conditions of this draft pick are unknown.
4. Conditions of this draft pick are unknown.
5. Toronto's acquired fourth-round pick went to Washington as the result of a trade on June 26, 2010, that sent a fourth-round pick (#116 overall) and a fifth-round pick in the 2010 entry draft to Toronto in exchange for this pick.
6. Toronto's acquired seventh-round pick went to Edmonton as the result of a trade on June 26, 2010, that sent a sixth-round pick in the 2011 entry draft to Toronto in exchange for this pick.
7. The condition was that Columbus would receive this pick if Los Angeles won the 2010 Stanley Cup. The condition was not met when Los Angeles were eliminated on April 25, 2010, in the first round of the 2010 Stanley Cup playoffs.
8. Carolina's acquired seventh-round pick went to Philadelphia as the result of a trade on June 26, 2010, that sent Jon Matsumoto to Carolina in exchange for this pick.
9. The Rangers' acquired second-round pick went to Calgary as the result of a trade on June 1, 2011, that sent Tim Erixon and a fifth-round pick in the 2011 entry draft to the Rangers in exchange for Roman Horak, a second-round pick (#45 overall) in the 2011 entry draft and this pick.
  The Rangers previously acquired the pick as the result of a trade on June 26, 2010, that sent Bobby Sanguinetti to Carolina in exchange for a sixth-round pick in the 2010 entry draft and this pick.
10. The conditions of this draft pick are unknown.
11. Anaheim's acquired sixth-round pick went to Ottawa as the result of a trade on February 17, 2011, that sent Jarkko Ruutu to Anaheim in exchange for this pick.
12. The conditions of this pick was if Morris re-signed by Phoenix for the 2010–11 NHL season they would receive a third-round pick and if Morris didn't re-signed, Phoenix would receive a fourth-round pick. The condition of a third-round pick was converted on July 1, 2010.
13. The conditions of this draft pick are unknown.
14. The conditions of this draft pick are unknown. No selections were made from this trade.

=== May ===
May 13, 2010	To Carolina Hurricanes Jared Staal	To Phoenix Coyotes 5th-round pick in 2010 (#138 – Louis Domingue)
May 26, 2010	To New York Rangers Jyri Niemi	To New York Islanders 6th-round pick in 2010 (ATL - #160 – Tanner Lane)^{1}
May 28, 2010	To Pittsburgh Penguins Mattias Modig	To Anaheim Ducks 6th-round pick in 2010 (#177 – Kevin Lind)

1. The Islanders' acquired sixth-round pick went to Atlanta as the result of a trade on June 26, 2010 that sent a fifth-round pick in the 2011 entry draft to the Islanders in exchange for a sixth-round pick (#155 overall) in the 2010 entry draft and this pick.

=== June ===
The 2010 NHL entry draft was held on June 25–26, 2010.

June 17, 2010	To St. Louis Blues Jaroslav Halak	To Montreal Canadiens Lars Eller; Ian Schultz
June 17, 2010	To St. Louis Blues T.J. Hensick	To Colorado Avalanche Julian Talbot
June 19, 2010	To Nashville Predators Ryan Parent	To Philadelphia Flyers Dan Hamhuis conditional 7th-round pick in 2011^{1}
June 19, 2010	To New Jersey Devils Jason Arnott	To Nashville Predators Matthew Halischuk; 5th-round pick in 2011 (#38 – Magnus Hellberg)
June 21, 2010	To Minnesota Wild Brad Staubitz	To San Jose Sharks 5th-round pick in 2010 (#129 – Freddie Hamilton)
June 22, 2010	To Boston Bruins Nathan Horton; Gregory Campbell	To Florida Panthers Dennis Wideman; 1st-round pick in 2010 (LAK - #15 – Derek Forbort)^{2} 3rd-round pick in 2011 (#91 – Kyle Rau)
June 23, 2010	To Atlanta Thrashers Future considerations	To San Jose Sharks Mike Vernace; Brett Sterling; 7th-round pick in 2010 (#188 – Lee Moffie)
June 24, 2010	To Atlanta Thrashers Dustin Byfuglien; Brent Sopel; Ben Eager; Akim Aliu	To Chicago Blackhawks Marty Reasoner; Joey Crabb; Jeremy Morin; 1st-round pick in 2010 (#24 – Kevin Hayes); 2nd-round pick in 2010 (#54 – Justin Holl)
June 24, 2010	To Edmonton Oilers Colin Fraser	To Chicago Blackhawks 6th-round pick in 2010 (#151 – Mirko Hofflin)
June 25, 2010	To Los Angeles Kings 1st-round pick in 2010 (#15 - Derek Forbort)	To Florida Panthers 1st-round pick in 2010 (#19 - Nick Bjugstad); 2nd-round pick in 2010 (MIN - #59 - Jason Zucker)^{1}
June 25, 2010	To Ottawa Senators David Rundblad	To St. Louis Blues 1st-round pick in 2010 (#16 - Vladimir Tarasenko)
June 25, 2010	To Pittsburgh Penguins Dan Hamhuis	To Philadelphia Flyers 3rd-round pick in 2011 (PHX - #84 - Harrison Ruopp)^{2}
June 25, 2010	To Montreal Canadiens 1st-round pick in 2010 (#22 - Jarred Tinordi); 4th-round pick in 2010 (#113 - Mark MacMillan)	To Phoenix Coyotes 1st-round pick in 2010 (#27 - Mark Visentin); 2nd-round pick in 2010 (#57 - Oscar Lindberg)
June 25, 2010	To Vancouver Canucks Keith Ballard; Victor Oreskovich	To Florida Panthers Steve Bernier; Michael Grabner; 1st-round pick in 2010 (#25 - Quinton Howden)
June 25, 2010	To New York Islanders 1st-round pick in 2010 (#30 - Brock Nelson)	To Chicago Blackhawks 2nd-round pick in 2010 (#35 - Ludvig Rensfeldt); 2nd-round pick in 2010 (#58 - Kent Simpson)
June 26, 2010	To Chicago Blackhawks Jimmy Hayes	To Toronto Maple Leafs 2nd-round pick in 2010 (#43 - Bradley Ross)
June 26, 2010	To Carolina Hurricanes Riley Nash	To Edmonton Oilers 2nd-round pick in 2010 (#46 - Martin Marincin)
June 26, 2010	To Los Angeles Kings 2nd-round pick in 2010 (#47 - Tyler Toffoli)	To Colorado Avalanche 2nd-round pick in 2010 (#49 - Calvin Pickard); 4th-round pick in 2010 (DAL - #109 - Alex Theriau)^{1}
June 26, 2010	To Minnesota Wild 2nd-round pick in 2010 (#59 - Jason Zucker)	To Florida Panthers 3rd-round pick in 2010 (#69 - Joe Basaraba); 4th-round pick in 2010 (#99 - Joonas Donskoi)
June 26, 2010	To St. Louis Blues Vladimir Sobotka	To Boston Bruins David Warsofsky
June 26, 2010	To Colorado Avalanche 3rd-round pick in 2010 (#71 - Michael Bournival)	To Dallas Stars 3rd-round pick in 2010 (#77 - Alexander Guptill); 4th-round pick in 2010 (#109 - Alex Theriau)
June 26, 2010	To Toronto Maple Leafs 3rd-round pick in 2010 (#79 - Sondre Olden)	To Los Angeles Kings 3rd-round pick in 2012 (NSH - #66 - Jimmy Vesey)^{2}
June 26, 2010	To Colorado Avalanche 4th-round pick in 2010 (#95 - Stephen Silas)	To New York Islanders 3rd-round pick in 2011 (#63 - Andrey Pedan)
June 26, 2010	To Washington Capitals 4th-round pick in 2010 (#112 - Philipp Grubauer)	To Toronto Maple Leafs 4th-round pick in 2010 (#116 - Petter Granberg); 5th-round pick in 2010 (#146 - Daniel Brodin)
June 26, 2010	To Toronto Maple Leafs Mike Brown	To Anaheim Ducks 5th-round pick in 2010 (#122 - Chris Wagner)
June 26, 2010	To New York Islanders 5th-round pick in 2011 (#127 - Brenden Kichton)	To Atlanta Thrashers 6th-round pick in 2010 (#155 - Kendall McFaull); 6th-round pick in 2010 (#160 - Tanner Lane)
June 26, 2010	To Carolina Hurricanes Bobby Sanguinetti	To New York Rangers 6th-round pick in 2010 (#157 - Jesper Fasth); 2nd-round pick in 2011 (CGY - #57 - Tyler Wotherspoon)^{3}
June 26, 2010	To Los Angeles Kings 6th-round pick in 2010 (#158 - Maxim Kitsyn)	To Atlanta Thrashers 6th-round pick in 2010 (#169 - Sebastian Owuya); 7th-round pick in 2010 (#199 - Peter Stoykewych)
June 26, 2010	To Calgary Flames Henrik Karlsson	To San Jose Sharks 6th-round pick in 2010 (#163 - Konrad Abeltshauser)
June 26, 2010	To San Jose Sharks 7th-round pick in 2010 (#200 - Christopher Crane)	To Pittsburgh Penguins 7th-round pick in 2010 (#209 - Scott Wilson)
June 26, 2010	To Edmonton Oilers 7th-round pick in 2010 (#202 - Kellen Jones)	To Toronto Maple Leafs 6th-round pick in 2011 (#152 - David Broll)
June 26, 2010	To Carolina Hurricanes Jon Matsumoto	To Philadelphia Flyers 7th-round pick in 2010 (#206 - Ricard Blidstrand)
June 26, 2010	To Boston Bruins 7th-round pick in 2010 (#210 - Zach Trotman)	To Chicago Blackhawks 7th-round pick in 2011 (#211 - Johan Mattsson)
June 28, 2010	To Colorado Avalanche Daniel Winnik	To Phoenix Coyotes 4th-round pick in 2012 (#102 - Rhett Holland)
June 29, 2010	To Nashville Predators Sergei Kostitsyn future considerations	To Montreal Canadiens Dan Ellis; Dustin Boyd future considerations
June 30, 2010	To Edmonton Oilers Jim Vandermeer	To Phoenix Coyotes Patrick O'Sullivan
June 30, 2010	To Toronto Maple Leafs Kris Versteeg; Bill Sweatt	To Chicago Blackhawks Viktor Stalberg; Chris DiDomenico; Philippe Paradis
June 30, 2010	To Anaheim Ducks Jason Jaffray conditional 7th-round pick in 2013^{1}	To Calgary Flames Logan MacMillan conditional 7th-round pick in 2013^{1}

1. The conditions of this draft pick were if Dan Hamhuis does not re-sign with Philadelphia and they do not trade his rights prior to July 1, 2010. Philadelphia traded his rights to Pittsburgh on June 25, 2010. Conditions were not met.
2. Florida's' first-round pick went to Los Angeles as the result of a trade on June 25, 2010, that sent a first-round pick (#19 overall) and a second-round pick in the 2010 entry draft to Florida in exchange for this pick.
3. Florida's acquired second-round pick went to Minnesota as the result of a trade on June 26, 2010, that send a third-round pick and a fourth-round pick in 2010 entry draft to Florida in exchange for this pick.
4. Philadelphia's acquired third-round pick went to Phoenix as the result of a trade on June 7, 2011, that sent Ilya Bryzgalov to Philadelphia in exchange for Matt Clackson, a third-round pick in the 2012 entry draft and this conditional pick. The condition – Philadelphia signs Bryzgalov before the start of the third round of the draft – was converted on June 23, 2011.
5. Colorado's acquired fourth-round pick went to Dallas as the result of a trade on June 26, 2010, that sent a third-round pick (#71 overall) in the 2010 entry draft to the Colorado in exchange for a third-round pick (#77 overall) in the 2010 entry draft and this pick.
6. Los Angeles' acquired third-round pick went to Nashville as the result of a trade on June 25, 2011, that sent a third-round pick in the 2011 entry draft to Los Angeles in exchange for a sixth-round pick in the 2011 entry draft and this pick.
7. The Rangers' acquired second-round pick went to Calgary as the result of a trade on June 1, 2011, that sent Tim Erixon and a fifth-round pick in the 2011 entry draft to the Rangers in exchange for Roman Horak, a second-round pick (#45 overall) in the 2011 entry draft and this pick.
8. The conditions of these picks are unknown. No selections were made from this trade.

== Waivers ==
Once an NHL player has played in a certain number of games or a set number of seasons has passed since the signing of his first NHL contract (see here), that player must be offered to all of the other NHL teams before he can be assigned to a minor league affiliate.

July 16, 2009	Nigel Dawes	Calgary Flames	Phoenix Coyotes
September 25, 2009	Radek Smolenak	Chicago Blackhawks	Tampa Bay Lightning
September 28, 2009	Rob Schremp	New York Islanders	Edmonton Oilers
September 30, 2009	Paul Bissonnette	Phoenix Coyotes	Pittsburgh Penguins
September 30, 2009	Chris Bourque	Pittsburgh Penguins	Washington Capitals
October 2, 2009	Christoph Schubert	Atlanta Thrashers	Ottawa Senators
October 9, 2009	Radek Smolenak	Tampa Bay Lightning	Chicago Blackhawks
October 17, 2009	Andrew Ebbett	Chicago Blackhawks	Anaheim Ducks
October 29, 2009	Randy Jones	Los Angeles Kings	Philadelphia Flyers
November 6, 2009	Jay Leach	Montreal Canadiens	New Jersey Devils
November 10, 2009	Steve MacIntyre	Florida Panthers	Edmonton Oilers
November 11, 2009	Drew Miller	Detroit Red Wings	Tampa Bay Lightning
November 21, 2009	Andrew Ebbett	Minnesota Wild	Chicago Blackhawks
December 1, 2009	Jay Leach	San Jose Sharks	Montreal Canadiens
December 2, 2009	Erik Christensen	New York Rangers	Anaheim Ducks
December 4, 2009	Chris Bourque	Washington Capitals	Pittsburgh Penguins
December 15, 2009	Michael Leighton	Philadelphia Flyers	Carolina Hurricanes
January 21, 2010	Nate Thompson	Tampa Bay Lightning	New York Islanders
February 11, 2010	Brandon Segal	Dallas Stars	Los Angeles Kings
February 13, 2010	Jamie Lundmark	Toronto Maple Leafs	Calgary Flames
February 27, 2010	Alex Auld	New York Rangers	Dallas Stars
March 3, 2010	Ryan Jones	Edmonton Oilers	Nashville Predators

== See also ==
- 2009 NHL entry draft
- 2010 NHL entry draft
- 2009 in sports
- 2010 in sports
- 2008–09 NHL transactions
- 2010–11 NHL transactions
