= Byron Bitz =

Canadian ice hockey player (born 1984)

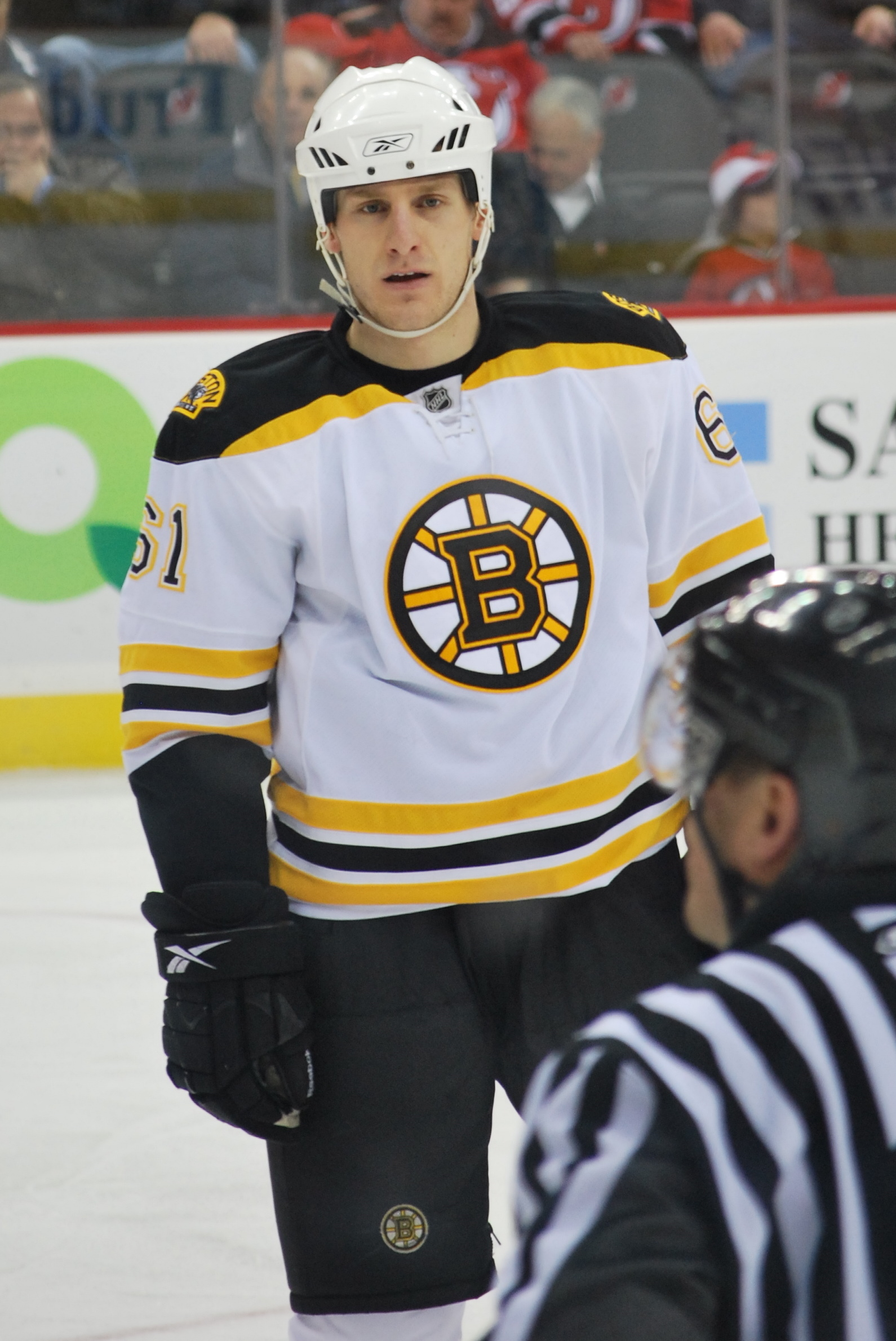
- Born: July 21, 1984 (age 42) Saskatoon, Saskatchewan, Canada
- Height: 6 ft 5 in (196 cm)
- Weight: 225 lb (102 kg; 16 st 1 lb)
- Position: Right wing
- Shot: Right
- Played for: Florida Panthers; Boston Bruins; Vancouver Canucks
- NHL draft: 107th overall, 2003; Boston Bruins
- Playing career: 2007–2012

Byron John Bitz (born July 21, 1984) is a Canadian former professional ice hockey winger. He last played with the Vancouver Canucks of the National Hockey League (NHL). A third- or fourth-line forward, he was known for his size and physicality.

A native of Saskatchewan, Bitz played minor hockey in his hometown of Saskatoon. After earning rookie of the year honours in the British Columbia Hockey League (BCHL) with the Nanaimo Clippers, he was selected 107th overall in the 2003 NHL entry draft by the Boston Bruins. Before turning professional with the Bruins organization, he spent four years playing college hockey with the Cornell Big Red, helping the team to an ECAC Hockey championship in 2005 and serving as captain in 2006–07 as a senior.

After signing with the Bruins in August 2007, Bitz played one season in the American Hockey League (AHL) with the Providence Bruins, Boston's minor league affiliate. The following season, he earned a spot on Boston's roster. In March 2010, he was traded to the Florida Panthers. His tenure with Florida was beset with injuries, however, and he missed the entire 2010–11 season with a sports hernia. Becoming an unrestricted free agent in July 2011, he signed with the Vancouver Canucks.

== Playing career ==
=== Junior and college ===
After playing minor hockey in Saskatchewan with the Saskatoon AAA Contacts of his hometown, Bitz joined the Junior A ranks with the Nanaimo Clippers of the British Columbia Hockey League (BCHL) in 2002–03. As a rookie, he recorded 27 goals and 73 points over 58 games in his lone season with the Clippers. His performance earned him the Bruce Allison Memorial Trophy as the Coastal Conference's rookie of the year.

During the off-season, Bitz was selected in the fourth round, 107th overall, in the 2003 NHL entry draft by the Boston Bruins. Upon being drafted, he joined the Cornell Big Red of the NCAA's ECAC Hockey conference. In his freshman year (2003–04), he recorded 5 goals and 21 points over 31 games. The following season, he registered 5 goals and 15 points over 29 games, helping the Big Red to the Whitelaw Cup as ECAC Hockey's 2005 playoff champion. They defeated the Harvard Crimson 3–1 in the final. Qualifying for the 2005 NCAA Tournament, the Big Red lost their regional final to the Minnesota Golden Gophers 2–1 in overtime.

In 2005–06, he notched a college career-high 10 goals and 28 points over 35 games. His efforts earned him an honourable mention on the All-Ivy Team. During Bitz's senior year, he served as team captain and tallied 8 goals and 24 points over 29 games. He earned First Team All-Ivy and Third Team All-ECAC Hockey honours, in addition to being distinguished with numerous team and university awards. He received the Mark Weiss Award for determination and passion and the Ironman Award for overcoming injury; Bitz was additionally selected for membership in the Quill and Dagger Senior Honor Society.

=== Professional ===
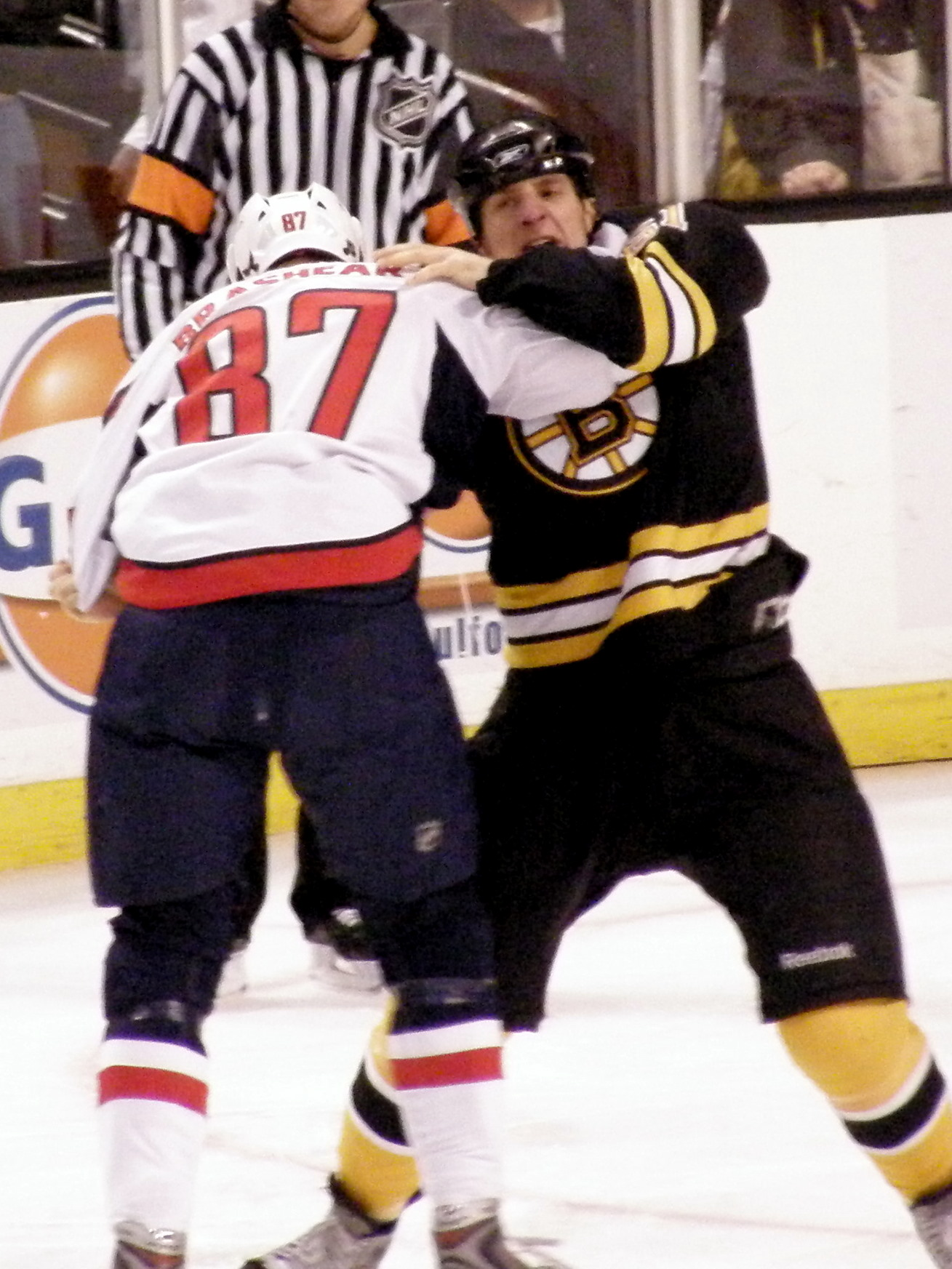
Bitz (right) fights with Washington Capitals forward Donald Brashear.

After signing an entry-level contract with Boston on August 6, 2007, Bitz began his professional career in 2007–08 with the Providence Bruins, Boston's American Hockey League (AHL) affiliate. After debuting with the team on October 17, in a game against the Lowell Devils, he scored his first AHL goal against goaltender Frank Doyle in a 5–1 win against the Lowell 10 days later. Bitz finished the season with 27 points (13 goals and 14 assists) over 61 games, tying for 39th among league rookies. In the 2008 playoffs, he added a goal and an assist over 10 games as the Bruins advanced to the second round, where they were eliminated by the Portland Pirates.

After beginning the 2008–09 season in the AHL, Bitz was called up and played his first career NHL game with the Bruins on January 10, 2009, against the Carolina Hurricanes. He registered an assist on a Mark Stuart goal as the Bruins won the game 5–1. Nearly a month later, during his 13th NHL game on February 7, he recorded his first NHL goal in a 4–3 overtime loss to the Philadelphia Flyers. Bitz scored after a shot from Mark Stuart rebounded off goaltender Martin Biron towards him. Later that month, on February 24, Bitz had his first multi-goal game, scoring the third and fourth Bruins goals in a 6–1 home victory over the Florida Panthers. Needing one more goal for a hat trick, Bruins fans at the stadium began chanting "We Want Bitz" late in the game. Remaining with Boston for the remainder of the season, he totalled four goals and seven points over 35 games. Prior to his call-up, he had registered 3 goals and 10 points over 37 AHL games. Boston entered the 2009 playoffs first seed in the Eastern Conference, coinciding with Bitz's NHL post-season debut. After the Bruins eliminated Montreal Canadiens in the opening round, Bitz scored his first NHL playoff goal on May 14, during Game 7 of the second round versus the Carolina Hurricanes. His goal opened the scoring in the contest, which the Bruins lost 3–2 in overtime, eliminating them from the playoffs. Bitz finished with a goal and an assist over five playoff games.

During his first season, Bitz established himself as a physical player in the NHL, a trait for which he became a fan favourite in Boston. After 45 games with the Bruins in 2009–10, however, he was traded to the Florida Panthers, along with Craig Weller and a second round selection in the 2010 draft, in exchange for Dennis Seidenberg and Matthew Bartkowski, on March 3, 2010. Eight days after his acquisition from the Panthers, he suffered a lower-body injury, sidelining him for four games. In his first game back, he scored his first and only goal as a Panther on March 20 in a 3–1 loss to the Buffalo Sabres. Soon thereafter, he suffered an elbow injury that forced him to miss the remaining eight contests of the season. Between Boston and Florida, Bitz totalled 5 goals and 11 points over 52 games in his second NHL season.

During the Panthers' training camp in September 2010, Bitz suffered an injury that was originally reported as a groin strain. The following month, he underwent surgery for a sports hernia and was projected to return to the lineup within six weeks. By mid-November, he told reporters he was close to returning, but complications in his recovery caused tears in his groin and hip labrum, requiring additional surgeries in January and March 2011.

After missing the entire 2010–11 season, the Panthers opted against qualifying Bitz with an offer for the next campaign, making him an unrestricted free agent on July 1, 2011. Nearly a month into the free agency period, Bitz signed a one-year, two-way contract worth $700,000 at the NHL level and $105,000 at the minor league level with the Vancouver Canucks on July 25. With training camp approaching, Bitz continued to experience abdominal issues and underwent his fourth surgery in a year. He was subsequently sidelined until January 2012. Upon recovering, he was assigned to the Canucks' AHL affiliate, the Chicago Wolves. Within a month, he was recalled by the Canucks to replace injured winger Chris Higgins and made his debut with the team on February 4 against the Colorado Avalanche. The following game, he scored his first NHL goal since March 2010. He also added an assist for his first two points as a Canuck in a 4–3 win against the Nashville Predators.

== Career statistics ==
			Regular season					Playoffs
Season	Team	League	GP	G	A	Pts	PIM	GP	G	A	Pts	PIM
2000–01	Saskatoon AAA Contacts	SMHL	39	10	23	33	41	—	—	—	—	—
2001–02	Saskatoon AAA Contacts	SMHL	41	25	48	73	69	11	12	10	22	9
2001–02	Estevan Bruins	SJHL	2	1	0	1	0	—	—	—	—	—
2002–03	Nanaimo Clippers	BCHL	58	27	46	73	69	—	—	—	—	—
2003–04	Cornell Big Red	ECAC	31	5	16	21	36	—	—	—	—	—
2004–05	Cornell Big Red	ECAC	29	5	10	15	20	—	—	—	—	—
2005–06	Cornell Big Red	ECAC	35	10	18	28	52	—	—	—	—	—
2006–07	Cornell Big Red	ECAC	29	8	16	24	49	—	—	—	—	—
2007–08	Providence Bruins	AHL	61	13	14	27	70	10	1	1	2	6
2008–09	Providence Bruins	AHL	37	3	7	10	68	—	—	—	—	—
2008–09	Boston Bruins	NHL	35	4	3	7	18	5	1	1	2	2
2009–10	Boston Bruins	NHL	45	4	5	9	31	—	—	—	—	—
2009–10	Florida Panthers	NHL	7	1	1	2	2	—	—	—	—	—
2011–12	Chicago Wolves	AHL	24	2	7	9	11	3	0	1	1	2
2011–12	Vancouver Canucks	NHL	10	1	3	4	14	1	0	0	0	15
AHL totals			122	18	28	46	149	13	1	2	3	8
NHL totals			97	10	12	22	65	6	1	1	2	17

== Awards and honours ==
Award	Year
Bruce Allison Memorial Trophy (BCHL's Coastal Conference rookie of the year)	2002–03
Honorable Mention All-Ivy League Honors	2005–06
First-Team All-Ivy League Honors	2006–07
All-ECAC Hockey Third Team	2006–07
Mark Weiss Award (Cornell Big Red's award for determination and passion)	2006–07
Ironman Award (Cornell Big Red's award for overcoming injury)	2006–07
Inducted as Quill and Dagger member (Cornell University's senior honour society)	2007
