= Alexander Fällström =

Swedish ice hockey player (born 1990)

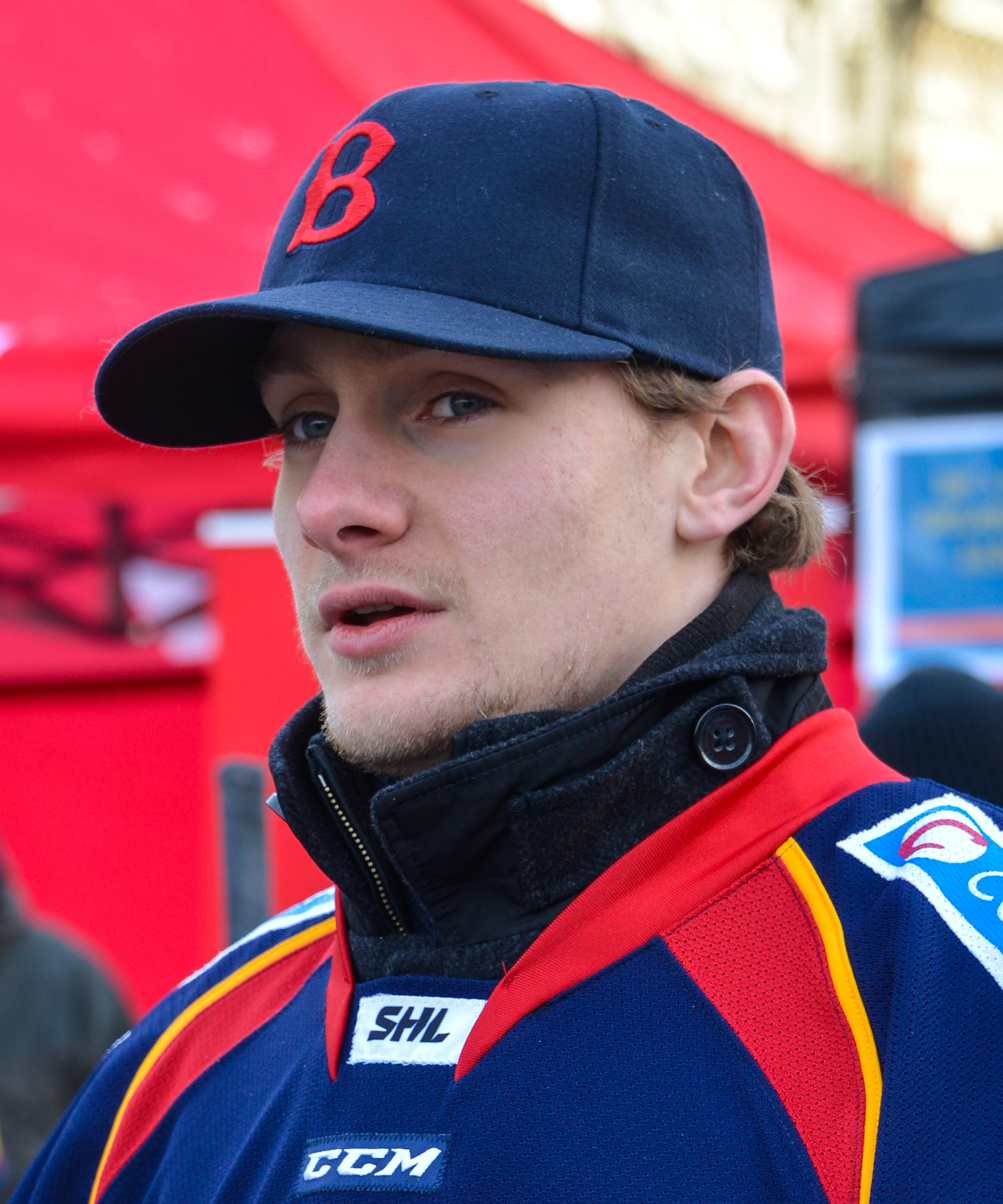
- Alexander Fällström in Stockholm 2015.
- Born: September 15, 1990 (age 35) Gothenburg, Sweden
- Height: 6 ft 2 in (188 cm)
- Weight: 202 lb (92 kg; 14 st 6 lb)
- Position: Right wing
- Shot: Right
- Played for: Providence Bruins; Djurgårdens IF
- NHL draft: 116th overall, 2009; Minnesota Wild
- Playing career: 2012–2016

Alexander C. Fällström (born September 15, 1990) is a Swedish former professional ice hockey Forward. He last played under contract with Djurgårdens IF in the Swedish Hockey League (SHL). Fällström was selected by the Minnesota Wild in the 4th round (116th overall) of the 2009 NHL entry draft.

== Playing career ==
Fällström played junior hockey in Djurgården before moving to the United States to play for Harvard University in the NCAA. During his freshman year, he lived in Canaday Hall. Fällström's tenure with the Wild was brief as his rights were traded along with Craig Weller, and a second round pick in 2011 to the Boston Bruins in exchange for Chuck Kobasew on October 18, 2009. He was later signed to a two-year entry-level contract with the Boston Bruins on March 17, 2013.

Fällström played parts of three seasons for Boston's affiliate, the Providence Bruins in the American Hockey League.

In the final year of his entry-level contract, Fällström returned to Sweden during the 2014–15 season in signing a multi-year contract with original club, Djurgårdens IF. Fällström's second tenure with the club was blighted due to a concussion, limiting him to play in just 26 games over two seasons. Fällström was cleared to resume playing and was signed to a one-year extension with DIF on April 14, 2016.

In the lead up to the 2016–17 season, Fällström having recovered from his concussion symptoms was initially ruled out for the opening weeks due to a back injury. It was later announced, after specialist appointments, that Fällström's back injury was career threatening and he was ruled out for entirety of the season on October 2, 2016.

== Career statistics ==
			Regular season					Playoffs
Season	Team	League	GP	G	A	Pts	PIM	GP	G	A	Pts	PIM
2006–07	Djurgårdens IF	J20	2	0	0	0	0	1	0	0	0	0
2007–08	Shattuck-Saint Mary's	USHS	62	20	47	67	28	—	—	—	—	—
2008–09	Shattuck-Saint Mary's	USHS	52	40	47	87	52	—	—	—	—	—
2009–10	Harvard University	ECAC	32	4	8	12	23	—	—	—	—	—
2010–11	Harvard University	ECAC	22	7	5	12	17	—	—	—	—	—
2011–12	Harvard University	ECAC	28	13	12	25	10	—	—	—	—	—
2012–13	Harvard University	ECAC	31	9	12	21	22	—	—	—	—	—
2012–13	Providence Bruins	AHL	10	4	1	5	4	—	—	—	—	—
2013–14	Providence Bruins	AHL	28	3	5	8	17	12	0	3	3	4
2014–15	Providence Bruins	AHL	4	1	0	1	4	—	—	—	—	—
2014–15	Djurgårdens IF	SHL	22	6	3	9	10	—	—	—	—	—
2015–16	Djurgårdens IF	SHL	4	0	0	0	0	—	—	—	—	—
AHL totals			42	8	6	14	25	12	0	3	3	4
SHL totals			26	6	3	9	10	—	—	—	—	—
