= Craig Weller =

Canadian ice hockey player

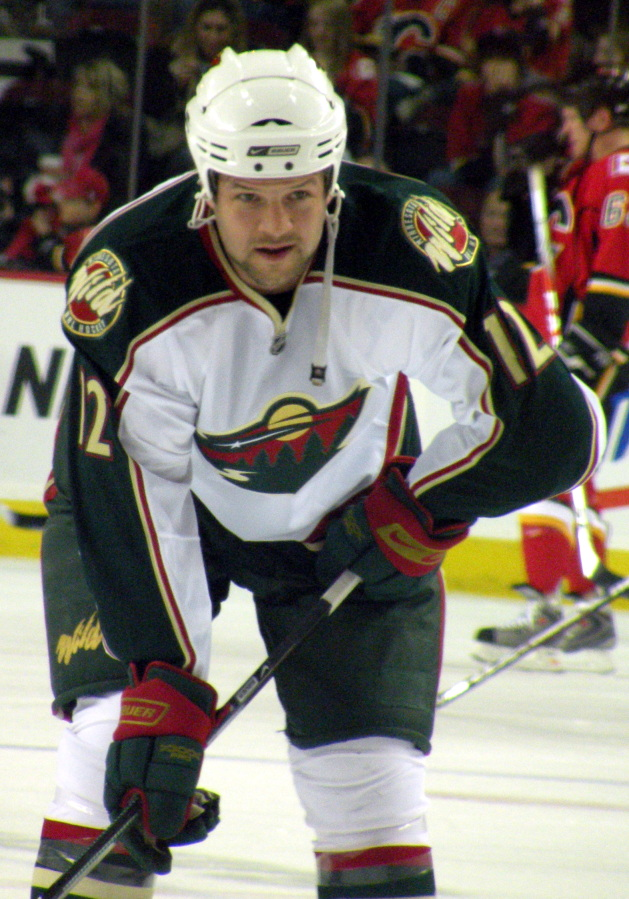
- Born: March 17, 1981 (age 45) Calgary, Alberta, Canada
- Height: 6 ft 4 in (193 cm)
- Weight: 220 lb (100 kg; 15 st 10 lb)
- Position: Right wing
- Shot: Right
- Played for: Phoenix Coyotes; Minnesota Wild; Florida Panthers; Cardiff Devils; Villacher SV; ERC Ingolstadt
- NHL draft: 167th overall, 2000; St. Louis Blues
- Playing career: 2002–2013

Craig Weller (born March 17, 1981) is a Canadian former professional ice hockey defenceman and right winger who played in the National Hockey League (NHL). Drafted 167th overall in the 2000 NHL entry draft, Weller played for the Phoenix Coyotes, Minnesota Wild, and Florida Panthers during his career.

== Playing career ==
Weller was born in Calgary, Alberta. As a youth, he played in the 1995 Quebec International Pee-Wee Hockey Tournament with the Calgary Junior Flames minor ice hockey team.

Weller was the St. Louis Blues' 5th round choice, 167th overall, in the 2000 NHL Draft. After playing with the Charlotte Checkers of the ECHL and the Hartford Wolfpack of the American Hockey League, he was signed as a free agent by the Phoenix Coyotes on July 19, 2007.

He scored his first career NHL goal on October 25, 2007, against the Anaheim Ducks; the goal turned out to be the game-winning goal.

On July 1, 2008, Weller signed a two-year, $1.2 million contract with the Minnesota Wild. On October 18, 2009, he was traded to the Boston Bruins along with prospect Alexander Fallstrom and a second round draft pick in 2011 in exchange for Chuck Kobasew.

On March 3, 2010, Weller was traded from the Bruins to the Florida Panthers along with Byron Bitz and a second round draft pick in exchange for Dennis Seidenberg and Matt Bartkowski.

On 1 November 2010, the Cardiff Devils of the EIHL in the UK announced they had signed Weller, who was a free agent at the time. He became the most experienced NHL player after Theoren Fleury to play in the Elite League, playing in his preferred position as a defenceman.

With Weller on board, the Devils embarked on 22-game unbeaten streak, breaking the league and world records. However, the Devils narrowly missed out on the league title, finishing level on points with the Sheffield Steelers but having won 1 regulation game less, before being beaten in the Playoff final 5–4 to the Nottingham Panthers. After his first season in the UK Weller quickly established himself as a reliable, solid two way defenceman, drawing admiration from across the league, culminating in 3 awards - League Player of the Season (Journalist's Choice), Player of the Season (Voted by League GM's and Coaches) and Defenceman of the Season (Voted by League GM's and Coaches).

Weller left the Devils to join Villacher SV of the Austrian Hockey League for a single season before venturing to Germany to accept a try-out with ERC Ingolstadt for the 2012–13 season. In establishing a position within Panther's lineup, Weller was signed for the remainder of the campaign on September 5, 2012.

== Career statistics ==
			Regular season					Playoffs
Season	Team	League	GP	G	A	Pts	PIM	GP	G	A	Pts	PIM
1997–98	Calgary Flames AAA	AMHL	33	2	10	12	65	3	0	1	1	2
1998–99	Calgary Canucks	AJHL	49	4	14	18	80	13	0	1	1	10
1999–2000	Calgary Canucks	AJHL	53	3	14	17	100	4	0	0	0	4
2000–01	University of Minnesota Duluth	WCHA	6	0	1	1	0	—	—	—	—	—
2000–01	Kootenay Ice	WHL	30	1	5	6	40	11	0	2	2	26
2001–02	Kootenay Ice	WHL	69	5	13	18	127	22	3	7	10	27
2002–03	Hartford Wolf Pack	AHL	11	0	0	0	8	2	0	0	0	0
2002–03	Charlotte Checkers	ECHL	48	3	11	14	84	—	—	—	—	—
2003–04	Hartford Wolf Pack	AHL	68	5	9	14	86	16	2	2	4	30
2004–05	Hartford Wolf Pack	AHL	76	10	9	19	182	6	0	1	1	6
2005–06	Hartford Wolf Pack	AHL	80	12	21	33	152	13	2	3	5	44
2006–07	Hartford Wolf Pack	AHL	56	11	6	17	96	4	0	0	0	4
2007–08	Phoenix Coyotes	NHL	59	3	8	11	80	—	—	—	—	—
2008–09	Minnesota Wild	NHL	36	1	2	3	47	—	—	—	—	—
2009–10	Houston Aeros	AHL	5	0	1	1	7	—	—	—	—	—
2009–10	Providence Bruins	AHL	55	4	10	14	62	—	—	—	—	—
2009–10	Chicago Wolves	AHL	14	0	3	3	21	4	0	0	0	4
2010–11	Cardiff Devils	EIHL	41	16	36	52	52	4	2	0	2	6
2011–12	EC VSV	AUT	45	5	6	11	107	—	—	—	—	—
2012–13	ERC Ingolstadt	DEL	34	0	1	1	36	4	0	1	1	27
2013–14	Bentley Generals	ChHL	8	2	5	7	0	5	2	1	3	6
AHL totals			365	42	60	102	614	45	4	6	10	88
NHL totals			95	4	10	14	127	—	—	—	—	—

== Awards and honours ==
Award	Year
WHL
West Second All-Star Team	2002
EIHL
Defenseman of the season	2011
Player of the season	2011
League Player of the season	2011
