= Matt Bartkowski =

American ice hockey player (born 1988)

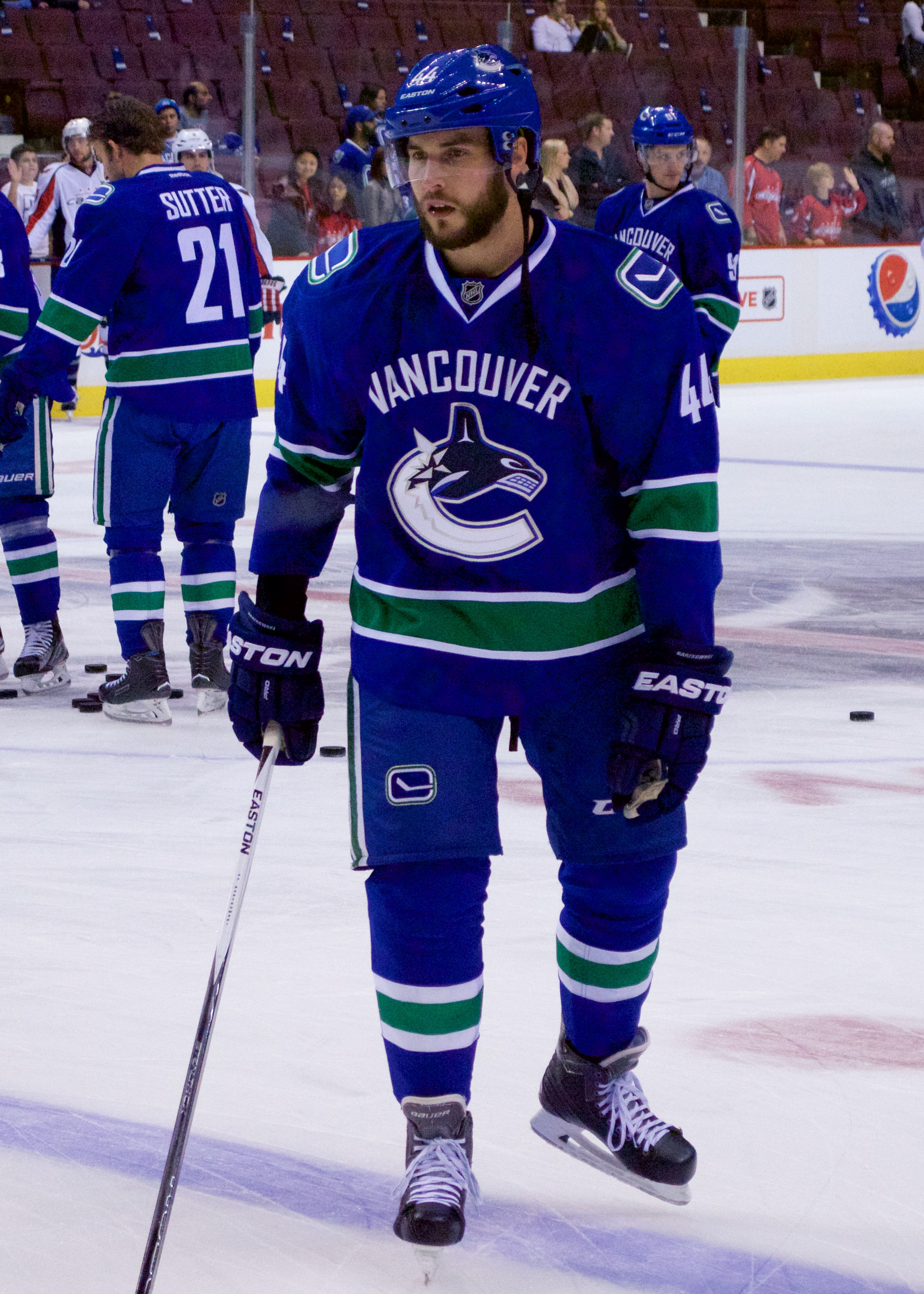
- Bartkowski with the Vancouver Canucks in 2015
- Born: June 4, 1988 (age 38) Pittsburgh, Pennsylvania, U.S.
- Height: 6 ft 1 in (185 cm)
- Weight: 196 lb (89 kg; 14 st 0 lb)
- Position: Defense
- Shot: Left
- Played for: Boston Bruins; Vancouver Canucks; Calgary Flames; Minnesota Wild; WBS Penguins; Rochester Americans
- NHL draft: 190th overall, 2008; Florida Panthers
- Playing career: 2010–2023

Matthew Richard Bartkowski (born June 4, 1988) is an American former professional ice hockey defenseman. He most recently played for the Rochester Americans of the American Hockey League (AHL).

== Playing career ==
=== Florida Panthers ===
Bartkowski played high school hockey at Mt. Lebanon High School in suburban Pittsburgh. He was selected by the Florida Panthers in the 7th Round (190th overall) of the 2008 NHL entry draft following his final year in the USHL with the Lincoln Stars.

=== Boston Bruins ===
On March 3, 2010, the Panthers traded Bartkowski, along with Dennis Seidenberg, to the Boston Bruins for Byron Bitz, Craig Weller, and a 2nd round 2010 NHL entry draft choice. On April 29, 2010, Bartkowski was then signed to a two-year entry-level contract with the Bruins.

On January 10, 2011, Bartkowski made his NHL debut for the Boston Bruins against his hometown team, the Pittsburgh Penguins. The Bruins went on to win the game 4-2, with Bartkowski registering two penalty minutes.

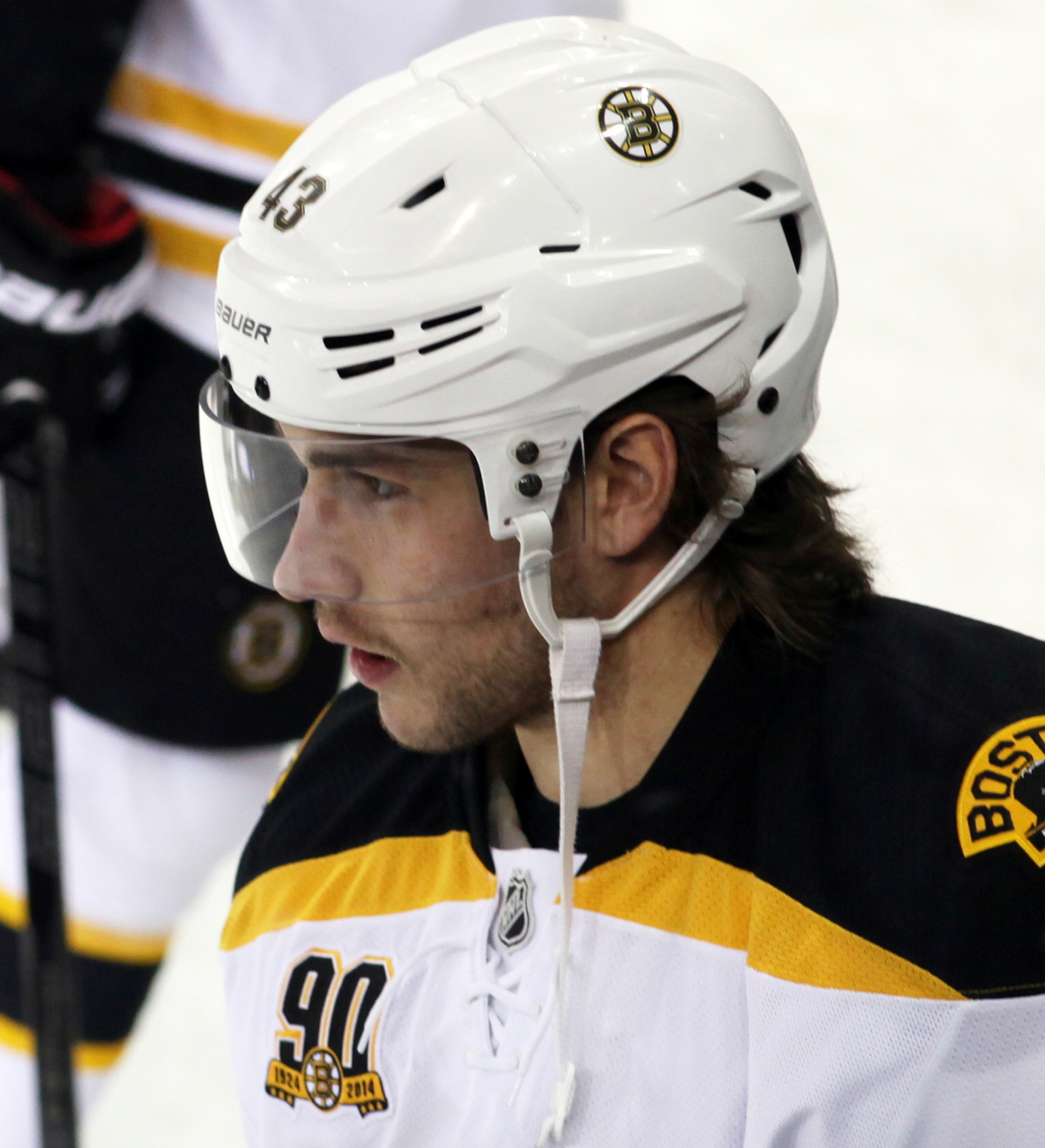
Bartkowski with the Bruins in 2013

On June 15, 2011, the Boston Bruins won the Stanley Cup in game seven against the Vancouver Canucks. Bartkowski got to take part in the Bruins celebration and he also got to raise the Stanley Cup without playing a single playoff game with the Bruins. He did not, however, have his name engraved on the Stanley Cup, as a player to have his name inscribed must have played at least 41 games for the championship team during the regular season (provided the player remains with the team when they win the Cup) or played in at least one game of the Stanley Cup Final.

On May 13, 2013, Bartkowski scored his first NHL goal, notching a playoff goal during Boston's Game seven win over the Toronto Maple Leafs in the Conference Quarterfinals of the 2013 Stanley Cup playoffs.

On July 14, 2014, Bartkowski signed a one-year extension with the Bruins worth $1.25 million, avoiding arbitration.

=== Vancouver Canucks ===
On July 1, 2015, Bartkowski signed a one-year deal with the Vancouver Canucks. On October 18, 2015, Bartkowski scored his first NHL regular season goal in a 2-1 loss to the Edmonton Oilers. The goal came in Bartkowski's 137th game played in the NHL.

Bartkowski appeared in a career-high 80 games for the Canucks during the 2015-16 season, scoring 18 points. However, the club chose not to re-sign him at season's end, making him an unrestricted free agent.

On September 16, 2016, Bartkowski was signed to a professional tryout by the Ottawa Senators. On October 5, he was released from his professional tryout with the Senators. He returned informally to the Bruins organization in accepting a professional try-out contract with former club, the Providence Bruins of the AHL to begin the 2016–17 season. In 34 games with Providence, Bartkowski added 2 goals and 10 points.

=== Calgary Flames ===
On February 15, 2017, Bartkowski was signed to a professional tryout with the Calgary Flames, reuniting him with head coach Glen Gulutzan, formerly an assistant in Vancouver. The next day, Bartkowski signed a two-year, two-way deal with the Flames.

=== Minnesota Wild ===
On July 1, 2018, as a free agent from the Flames, Bartkowski agreed to a one-year, two-way contract with the Minnesota Wild. He re-signed with the Wild on another one-year, two-way contract on June 11, 2019.

=== Later years ===
As a free agent after three seasons within the Wild organization, Bartkowski agreed to attend the Pittsburgh Penguins training camp on a professional tryout basis in preparation for the 2021–22 season. After participating in pre-season, Bartkowski was released by Pittsburgh and signed to a one-year AHL contract with affiliate, the Wilkes-Barre/Scranton Penguins, on October 2, 2021.

Following a full season with Wilkes-Barre/Scranton, Bartkowski for the second consecutive season went un-signed over the summer. He later joined the Rochester Americans in the AHL, affiliate to the Buffalo Sabres, agreeing to a professional tryout contract on October 29, 2022 to begin the 2022–23 season. He converted the tryout into a full-time contract in December 2022, spending the rest of the year with Rochester.

Bartkowski retired after the 2022-23 season and is currently a broadcaster with SportsNet Pittsburgh.

== Career statistics ==
			Regular season					Playoffs
Season	Team	League	GP	G	A	Pts	PIM	GP	G	A	Pts	PIM
2004–05	Mount Lebanon High School	HS-PA	—	—	—	—	—	—	—	—	—	—
2004–05	Pittsburgh Predators AAA	U18 AAA	—	—	—	—	—	—	—	—	—	—
2005–06	Mount Lebanon High School	HS-PA	21	14	29	43	—	—	—	—	—	—
2005–06	Pittsburgh Predators AAA	U18 AAA	—	—	—	—	—	—	—	—	—	—
2006–07	Lincoln Stars	USHL	57	3	6	9	95	3	0	0	0	2
2007–08	Lincoln Stars	USHL	60	4	37	41	135	8	1	4	5	10
2008–09	Ohio State University	CCHA	41	5	15	20	46	—	—	—	—	—
2009–10	Ohio State University	CCHA	39	6	12	18	99	—	—	—	—	—
2010–11	Providence Bruins	AHL	69	5	18	23	42	—	—	—	—	—
2010–11	Boston Bruins	NHL	6	0	0	0	4	—	—	—	—	—
2011–12	Boston Bruins	NHL	3	0	0	0	0	—	—	—	—	—
2011–12	Providence Bruins	AHL	50	3	19	22	38	—	—	—	—	—
2012–13	Providence Bruins	AHL	56	3	21	24	56	5	0	5	5	4
2012–13	Boston Bruins	NHL	11	0	2	2	6	7	1	1	2	4
2013–14	Boston Bruins	NHL	64	0	18	18	30	8	0	1	1	10
2014–15	Boston Bruins	NHL	47	0	4	4	37	—	—	—	—	—
2015–16	Vancouver Canucks	NHL	80	6	12	18	50	—	—	—	—	—
2016–17	Providence Bruins	AHL	34	2	8	10	27	—	—	—	—	—
2016–17	Calgary Flames	NHL	24	1	1	2	26	4	0	0	0	0
2017–18	Calgary Flames	NHL	18	0	3	3	4	—	—	—	—	—
2018–19	Iowa Wild	AHL	70	4	15	19	48	11	1	1	2	10
2018–19	Minnesota Wild	NHL	2	1	0	1	0	—	—	—	—	—
2019–20	Iowa Wild	AHL	55	2	16	18	55	—	—	—	—	—
2019–20	Minnesota Wild	NHL	—	—	—	—	—	1	0	0	0	0
2020–21	Iowa Wild	AHL	23	1	7	8	19	—	—	—	—	—
2020–21	Minnesota Wild	NHL	1	0	0	0	0	—	—	—	—	—
2021–22	Wilkes-Barre/Scranton Penguins	AHL	72	4	12	16	29	6	1	0	1	0
2022–23	Rochester Americans	AHL	65	3	11	14	60	14	2	1	3	8
NHL totals			256	8	40	48	157	20	1	2	3	14

== Awards and honors ==
Award	Year
USHL
First All-Star Team	2008
College
All-CCHA Rookie Team	2009
