= Chuck Kobasew =

Canadian ice hockey player (born 1982)

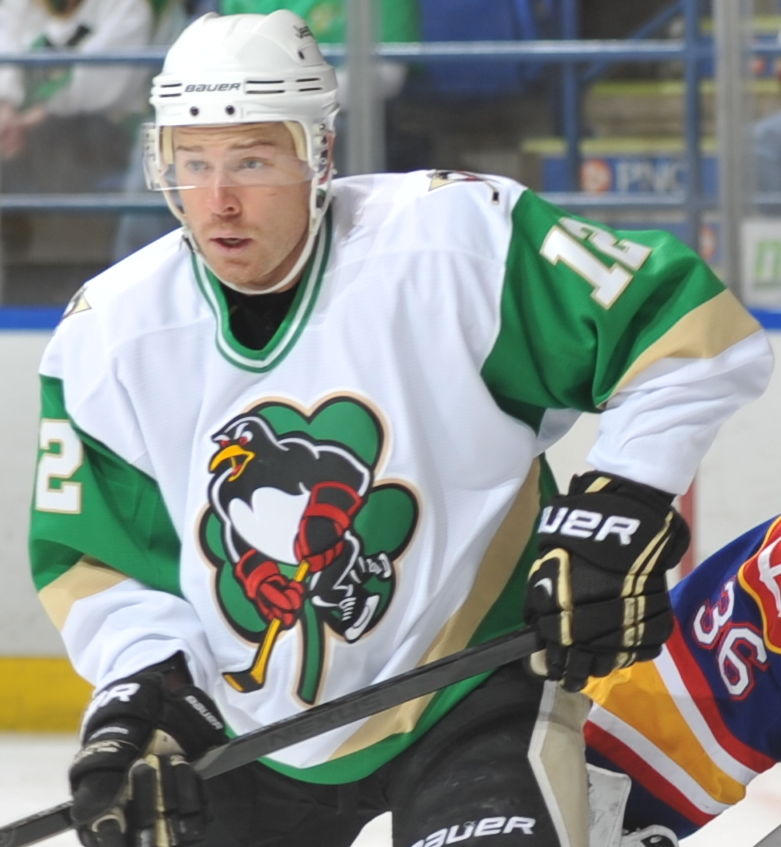
- Kobasew with the Wilkes-Barre/Scranton Penguins in 2014
- Born: April 17, 1982 (age 44) Osoyoos, British Columbia, Canada
- Height: 6 ft 1 in (185 cm)
- Weight: 195 lb (88 kg; 13 st 13 lb)
- Position: Right wing
- Shot: Right
- Played for: Calgary Flames; Boston BruinsCalgary Hitmen; Minnesota Wild; Colorado Avalanche; Pittsburgh Penguins; SC Bern
- NHL draft: 14th overall, 2001; Calgary Flames
- Playing career: 2002–2016

Nicholas James Kobasew (born April 17, 1982) is a Canadian former professional ice hockey right winger who played eleven seasons in the National Hockey League (NHL).

== Playing career ==
=== Amateur ===
Kobasew is from the town of Osoyoos, British Columbia, 398 kilometres east of Vancouver. He spent one season playing at Boston College, starring on a team which won the National Championship and was loaded with players headed to the NHL. At the 2001 NCAA Frozen Four, the Eagles defeated the North Dakota Fighting Sioux 3–2 in overtime. Kobasew was named MVP for the tournament.

=== Professional ===
Kobasew was drafted by the Calgary Flames in the first round (14th overall) in the 2001 NHL entry draft. During the 2004–05 NHL lockout, Kobasew played with the American Hockey League (AHL)'s Lowell Lock Monsters, and helped the team reach a number of franchise records. He was named as team captain, and scored 75 points in 79 games. He was also selected to play for the Canadian contingent at that year's All-Star game.

While playing for the Flames, Kobasew scored his first career hat trick against the Colorado Avalanche on January 24, 2006.

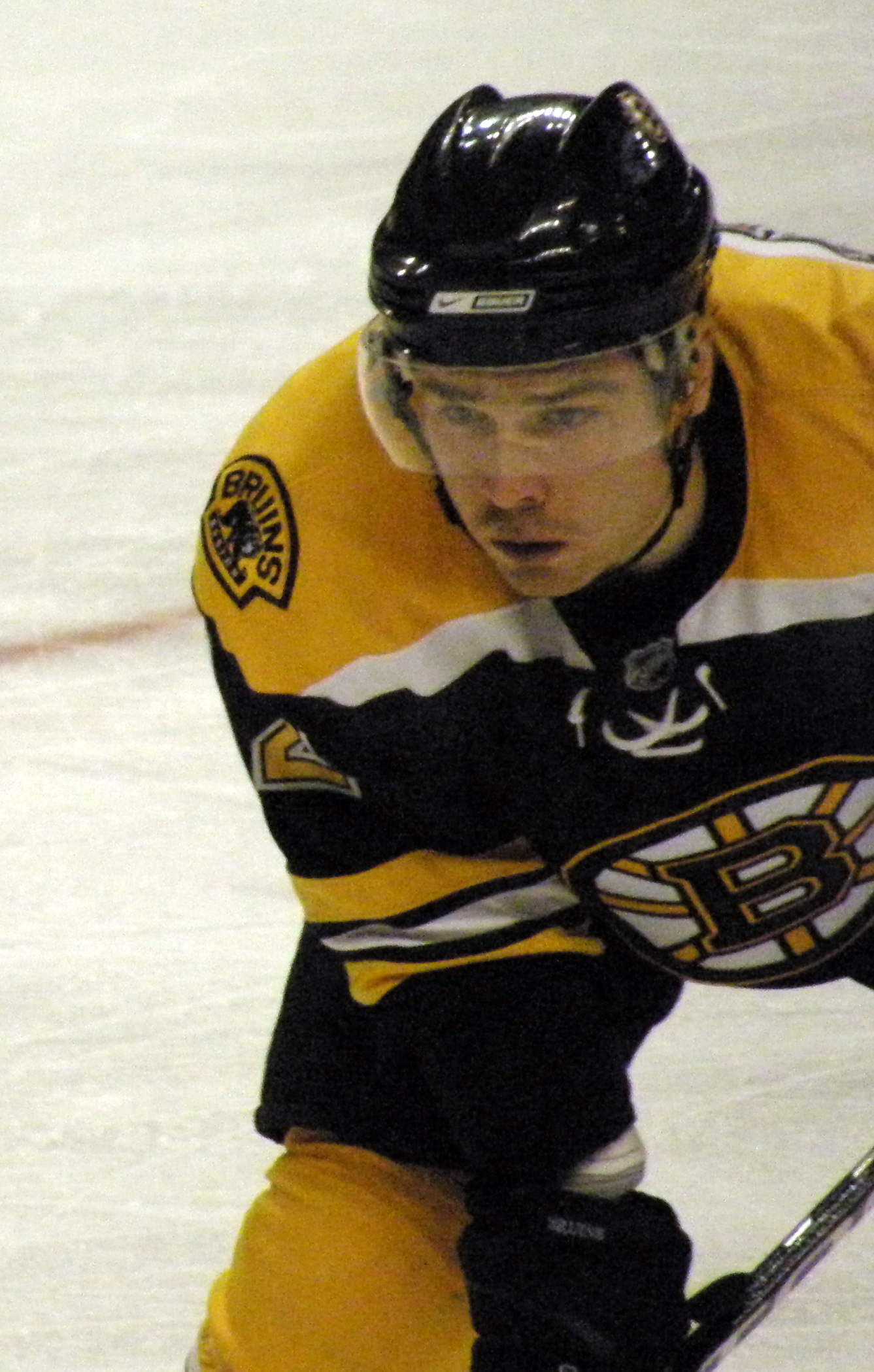
Kobasew with the Bruins in 2008.

On February 10, 2007, Kobasew and Andrew Ference were traded by the Flames to the Boston Bruins in exchange for Brad Stuart and Wayne Primeau. On May 13, 2008, Kobasew signed a 3-year contract extension with the Bruins worth $7 million. Kobasew scored 21 goals along with 21 assists during the 2008-09 NHL Season as the Bruins reached the Eastern Conference Semi-Finals.

Kobasew was traded by the Bruins to the Minnesota Wild in exchange for Craig Weller, a second-round pick in 2011, and the rights to prospect Alexander Fallstrom on October 18, 2009. On November 27, 2009, Kobasew scored his second career hat trick similarly against the Colorado Avalanche.

On July 1, 2011, Kobasew agreed to a two-year deal worth $1.25 million per year with the Colorado Avalanche. Kobasew made his Avalanche debut on opening night of the 2011–12 season in a 3–0 defeat to the Detroit Red Wings on October 8, 2011. Whilst entrenched on the Avalanche in a checking line role, Kobasew appeared in his 500th game, along with linemate Jay McClement, on December 8, 2011, against his original club, the Calgary Flames. He reached another milestone on December 31, when he scored his 100th career NHL goal, a game-winner, in a 4–2 victory over the Anaheim Ducks. Whilst impeded with various injuries throughout the season, Kobasew finished his first year with the Avalanche with 7 goals and 14 points in 58 games.

In the final year of his contract in the lockout shortened 2012–13 season, Kobasew was primarily limited to a fourth line role with the Avalanche. On March 20, 2013, Kobasew recorded his 100th career assist, added a late game-winning goal and recorded a career high Plus–minus 4 in a 4–3 victory over the Dallas Stars. He compiled 5 goals and 9 points in 37 games as Colorado failed to reach the playoffs for a third consecutive season.

After the expiration of his contract with the Avalanche, Kobasew spent the off-season unsigned before accepting an invitation on September 11, 2013, to attend the Pittsburgh Penguins 2013 training camp on a professional try-out contract. On October 2, he signed a one-year, $550,000 contract with the team. In the 2013–14 season with the Penguins, Kobasew was used primarily in a checking depth role. After scoring only 2 goals in 33 games, Kobasew was placed on waivers and assigned to AHL affiliate, the Wilkes-Barre/Scranton Penguins. In playing at the AHL level for the first time in 9 years, Kobasew regained his scoring prowess with 11 goals in 12 games.

Kobasew signalled the end of his NHL career, in signing his first European contract on a two-year deal with Swiss club, SC Bern of the National League A (NLA) on July 1, 2014. During the 2015–16 season, in which Bern won the Swiss championship, Kobasew saw action in only ten games due to a concussion, suffered in October 2015. He would not return to play professionally due to his injury.

== Career statistics ==
=== Regular season and playoffs ===
			Regular season					Playoffs
Season	Team	League	GP	G	A	Pts	PIM	GP	G	A	Pts	PIM
1997–98	Osoyoos Heat	KIJHL	6	2	2	4	2	—	—	—	—	—
1998–99	Osoyoos Heat	KIJHL	23	25	24	49	8	—	—	—	—	—
1998–99	Penticton Panthers	BCHL	30	11	17	28	18	7	1	5	6	6
1999–2000	Penticton Panthers	BCHL	58	54	52	106	83	6	0	3	3	30
2000–01	Boston College	HE	43	27	22	49	38	—	—	—	—	—
2001–02	Kelowna Rockets	WHL	55	41	21	62	114	15	10	5	15	22
2002–03	Saint John Flames	AHL	48	21	12	33	61	—	—	—	—	—
2002–03	Calgary Flames	NHL	23	4	2	6	8	—	—	—	—	—
2003–04	Calgary Flames	NHL	70	6	11	17	51	26	0	1	1	24
2004–05	Lowell Lock Monsters	AHL	79	38	37	75	110	11	6	3	9	27
2005–06	Calgary Flames	NHL	77	20	11	31	64	7	1	0	1	0
2006–07	Calgary Flames	NHL	40	4	13	17	37	—	—	—	—	—
2006–07	Boston Bruins	NHL	10	1	1	2	25	—	—	—	—	—
2007–08	Boston Bruins	NHL	73	22	17	39	29	—	—	—	—	—
2008–09	Boston Bruins	NHL	68	21	21	42	56	11	3	3	6	14
2009–10	Boston Bruins	NHL	7	0	1	1	2	—	—	—	—	—
2009–10	Minnesota Wild	NHL	42	9	5	14	16	—	—	—	—	—
2010–11	Minnesota Wild	NHL	63	9	7	16	19	—	—	—	—	—
2011–12	Colorado Avalanche	NHL	58	7	7	14	51	—	—	—	—	—
2012–13	Colorado Avalanche	NHL	37	5	4	9	21	—	—	—	—	—
2013–14	Pittsburgh Penguins	NHL	33	2	0	2	15	—	—	—	—	—
2013–14	Wilkes–Barre/Scranton Penguins	AHL	12	11	2	13	20	14	8	6	14	40
2014–15	SC Bern	NLA	29	9	9	18	24	3	0	1	1	4
2015–16	SC Bern	NLA	10	4	4	8	25	—	—	—	—	—
NHL totals			601	110	100	210	394	44	4	4	8	38

=== International ===
Medal record

Representing Canada

World Junior Championships
Silver medal – second place	2002 Czech Republic	

Year	Team	Event	Result	GP	G	A	Pts	PIM
2002	Canada	WJC	2nd place, silver medalist(s)	7	5	1	6	2
Junior totals				7	5	1	6	2

== Awards and honours ==
Award	Year
BCHL
First All-Star Team	2000
Interior Division MVP	2000
College
All-Hockey East Second team	2000–01
HE All-Academic Team	2001
All-Hockey East Rookie Team	2000–01
Hockey East All-Tournament Team	2001
All-NCAA All-Tournament Team	2001
NCAA Tournament MVP	2001
NCAA Champion	2001
AHL
First All-Star Team	2005

Awards and achievements
Preceded by Rick DiPietro	Hockey East Rookie of the Year; 2000–01	Succeeded by Sean Collins
Preceded by Niko Dimitrakos	William Flynn Tournament Most Valuable Player; 2001	Succeeded by Darren Haydar
Preceded by Lee Goren	NCAA Tournament Most Outstanding Player; 2001	Succeeded by Grant Potulny
Sporting positions
Preceded by Brent Krahn	Calgary Flames' first-round draft pick 2001	Succeeded by Eric Nystrom
