= 2010–11 NHL transactions =

The following is a list of all team-to-team transactions that have occurred in the National Hockey League during the 2010–11 NHL season. It lists what team each player has been traded to, signed by, or claimed by, and for which player(s) or draft pick(s), if applicable. Players who have retired are also listed. The trade deadline for the 2010–11 NHL season occurred on February 28, 2011, at 3 pm EST.

== Retirement ==
Date	Last team	Name
July 13, 2010	Darryl Sydor	St. Louis Blues
July 26, 2010	Mike Van Ryn	Toronto Maple Leafs
July 31, 2010	Georges Laraque	Montreal Canadiens
August 6, 2010	Chris Chelios	Atlanta Thrashers
August 9, 2010	Riley Cote	Philadelphia Flyers
August 24, 2010	Aaron Ward	Anaheim Ducks
September 21, 2010	Brad May	Detroit Red Wings
September 26, 2010	Mathieu Dandenault	Montreal Canadiens
October 1, 2010	Darcy Tucker	Colorado Avalanche
October 1, 2010	Stephane Yelle	Colorado Avalanche
October 12, 2010	Kirk Maltby	Detroit Red Wings
December 6, 2010	Bill Guerin	Pittsburgh Penguins
December 8, 2010	Jere Lehtinen	Dallas Stars
December 23, 2010	Scott Walker	Washington Capitals
February 4, 2011	Craig Conroy	Calgary Flames
February 11, 2011	Andrew Peters	Vancouver Canucks
February 14, 2011	Peter Forsberg	Colorado Avalanche
March 8, 2011	Wade Belak	Nashville Predators
April 10, 2011	Adam Foote	Colorado Avalanche
May 19, 2011	Fredrik Modin	Calgary Flames
May 25, 2011	Brian Rafalski	Detroit Red Wings
May 26, 2011	Doug Weight	New York Islanders
June 15, 2011	Mark Recchi	Boston Bruins
June 29, 2011	Paul Kariya	St. Louis Blues
June 29, 2011	Todd Marchant	Anaheim Ducks

== Free agency ==
Note: This does not include players who have re-signed with their previous team as an unrestricted free agent or as a restricted free agent.

Date	Player	New team	Previous team
July 1, 2010	Martin Biron	New York Rangers	New York Islanders
July 1, 2010	Alex Tanguay	Calgary Flames	Tampa Bay Lightning
July 1, 2010	Sergei Gonchar	Ottawa Senators	Pittsburgh Penguins
July 1, 2010	Alex Auld	Montreal Canadiens	New York Rangers
July 1, 2010	Zbynek Michalek	Pittsburgh Penguins	Phoenix Coyotes
July 1, 2010	Antero Niittymaki	San Jose Sharks	Tampa Bay Lightning
July 1, 2010	Manny Malhotra	Vancouver Canucks	San Jose Sharks
July 1, 2010	Sean O'Donnell	Philadelphia Flyers	Los Angeles Kings
July 1, 2010	Joel Perrault	Vancouver Canucks	Phoenix Coyotes
July 1, 2010	Jody Shelley	Philadelphia Flyers	New York Rangers
July 1, 2010	Toni Lydman	Anaheim Ducks	Buffalo Sabres
July 1, 2010	Kurtis Foster	Edmonton Oilers	Tampa Bay Lightning
July 1, 2010	Derek Boogaard	New York Rangers	Minnesota Wild
July 1, 2010	Chris Mason	Atlanta Thrashers	St. Louis Blues
July 1, 2010	Paul Martin	Pittsburgh Penguins	New Jersey Devils
July 1, 2010	Colby Armstrong	Toronto Maple Leafs	Atlanta Thrashers
July 1, 2010	Jordan Leopold	Buffalo Sabres	Pittsburgh Penguins
July 1, 2010	Jeff Tambellini	Vancouver Canucks	New York Islanders
July 1, 2010	Dan Ellis	Tampa Bay Lightning	Montreal Canadiens
July 1, 2010	Henrik Tallinder	New Jersey Devils	Buffalo Sabres
July 1, 2010	Anton Volchenkov	New Jersey Devils	Ottawa Senators
July 1, 2010	Olli Jokinen	Calgary Flames	New York Rangers
July 1, 2010	Johan Hedberg	New Jersey Devils	Atlanta Thrashers
July 1, 2010	Dan Hamhuis	Vancouver Canucks	Pittsburgh Penguins
July 1, 2010	Matt Cullen	Minnesota Wild	Ottawa Senators
July 1, 2010	Eric Nystrom	Minnesota Wild	Calgary Flames
July 1, 2010	Adam Burish	Dallas Stars	Chicago Blackhawks
July 1, 2010	Andrew Raycroft	Dallas Stars	Vancouver Canucks
July 1, 2010	Jeremy Reich	Boston Bruins	New York Islanders
July 1, 2010	Ray Whitney	Phoenix Coyotes	Carolina Hurricanes
July 2, 2010	Ryan Craig	Pittsburgh Penguins	Tampa Bay Lightning
July 2, 2010	Triston Grant	Florida Panthers	Nashville Predators
July 2, 2010	Dany Sabourin	Washington Capitals	Boston Bruins
July 2, 2010	Tim Jackman	Calgary Flames	New York Islanders
July 2, 2010	Raitis Ivanans	Calgary Flames	Los Angeles Kings
July 2, 2010	Nate Guenin	Columbus Blue Jackets	Pittsburgh Penguins
July 2, 2010	Kyle Wilson	Columbus Blue Jackets	Washington Capitals
July 2, 2010	Pavel Kubina	Tampa Bay Lightning	Atlanta Thrashers
July 2, 2010	Chris Higgins	Florida Panthers	Calgary Flames
July 2, 2010	John Scott	Chicago Blackhawks	Minnesota Wild
July 2, 2010	Mark Eaton	New York Islanders	Pittsburgh Penguins
July 2, 2010	Milan Jurcina	New York Islanders	Washington Capitals
July 2, 2010	P.A. Parenteau	New York Islanders	New York Rangers
July 2, 2010	Zenon Konopka	New York Islanders	Tampa Bay Lightning
July 2, 2010	T.J. Hensick	St. Louis Blues	Colorado Avalanche
July 2, 2010	Warren Peters	Minnesota Wild	Tampa Bay Lightning
July 2, 2010	Andrew Ebbett	Phoenix Coyotes	Minnesota Wild
July 2, 2010	Trevor Smith	Anaheim Ducks	New York Islanders
July 2, 2010	Matthew Lombardi	Nashville Predators	Phoenix Coyotes
July 2, 2010	Richard Petiot	Edmonton Oilers	Chicago Blackhawks
July 2, 2010	David Liffiton	Colorado Avalanche	Columbus Blue Jackets
July 2, 2010	Greg Mauldin	Colorado Avalanche	New York Islanders
July 2, 2010	David Van der Gulik	Colorado Avalanche	Calgary Flames
July 2, 2010	Jason Bacashihua	Colorado Avalanche	Washington Capitals
July 2, 2010	Steve MacIntyre	Edmonton Oilers	Florida Panthers
July 3, 2010	Alexandre Giroux	Edmonton Oilers	Washington Capitals
July 3, 2010	Garrett Stafford	Phoenix Coyotes	Dallas Stars
July 3, 2010	Nolan Yonkman	Phoenix Coyotes	Nashville Predators
July 3, 2010	Matt Climie	Phoenix Coyotes	Dallas Stars
July 3, 2010	Brett Sterling	Pittsburgh Penguins	San Jose Sharks
July 5, 2010	Nathan McIver	Boston Bruins	Vancouver Canucks
July 5, 2010	Brett Clark	Tampa Bay Lightning	Colorado Avalanche
July 6, 2010	Chris Minard	Detroit Red Wings	Edmonton Oilers
July 6, 2010	Jamie Johnson	Detroit Red Wings	Florida Panthers
July 6, 2010	Joey MacDonald	Detroit Red Wings	Anaheim Ducks
July 6, 2010	Ryan Stone	Calgary Flames	Edmonton Oilers
July 7, 2010	Jaime Sifers	Atlanta Thrashers	Minnesota Wild
July 7, 2010	Jared Ross	Atlanta Thrashers	Philadelphia Flyers
July 7, 2010	Rob Niedermayer	Buffalo Sabres	New Jersey Devils
July 7, 2010	Andrew Hutchinson	Pittsburgh Penguins	Dallas Stars
July 7, 2010	Corey Locke	Ottawa Senators	New York Rangers
July 7, 2010	Joe Corvo	Carolina Hurricanes	Washington Capitals
July 7, 2010	Brian Fahey	Washington Capitals	Colorado Avalanche
July 7, 2010	Kyle Greentree	Washington Capitals	Chicago Blackhawks
July 7, 2010	Brett Lebda	Toronto Maple Leafs	Detroit Red Wings
July 7, 2010	Nathan Paetsch	Florida Panthers	Columbus Blue Jackets
July 7, 2010	Ben Walter	Colorado Avalanche	New Jersey Devils
July 9, 2010	Brett Palin	Nashville Predators	Calgary Flames
July 9, 2010	Ben Ondrus	Edmonton Oilers	Toronto Maple Leafs
July 10, 2010	Greg Moore	Philadelphia Flyers	Columbus Blue Jackets
July 12, 2010	Tyler Weiman	Vancouver Canucks	Colorado Avalanche
July 12, 2010	Brennan Evans	St. Louis Blues	Anaheim Ducks
July 12, 2010	Jeremy Williams	New York Rangers	Detroit Red Wings
July 12, 2010	Nathan Oystrick	St. Louis Blues	Anaheim Ducks
July 13, 2010	Shawn Belle	Edmonton Oilers	Montreal Canadiens
July 14, 2010	Brian Willsie	Washington Capitals	Colorado Avalanche
July 15, 2010	Joey Crabb	Toronto Maple Leafs	Chicago Blackhawks
July 15, 2010	Danny Richmond	Toronto Maple Leafs	Chicago Blackhawks
July 15, 2010	Sean Sullivan	San Jose Sharks	Phoenix Coyotes
July 16, 2010	Tim Conboy	Buffalo Sabres	Carolina Hurricanes
July 16, 2010	Brad Lukowich	Dallas Stars	Vancouver Canucks
July 16, 2010	Greg Stewart	Edmonton Oilers	Montreal Canadiens
July 16, 2010	Corey Potter	Pittsburgh Penguins	New York Rangers
July 16, 2010	Jamie Lundmark	Nashville Predators	Toronto Maple Leafs
July 20, 2010	Stefan Meyer	Calgary Flames	Phoenix Coyotes
July 21, 2010	Danny Syvret	Anaheim Ducks	Philadelphia Flyers
July 21, 2010	Jeremy Yablonski	New York Islanders	Ottawa Senators
July 22, 2010	Dan Jancevski	Philadelphia Flyers	Dallas Stars
July 22, 2010	Jean-Philippe Lamoureux	Calgary Flames	Buffalo Sabres
July 23, 2010	Marc-Antoine Pouliot	Tampa Bay Lightning	Edmonton Oilers
July 24, 2010	Mark Cullen	Florida Panthers	Chicago Blackhawks
July 25, 2010	Chris Durno	Tampa Bay Lightning	Colorado Avalanche
July 27, 2010	Alexander Frolov	New York Rangers	Los Angeles Kings
July 27, 2010	Alexei Ponikarovsky	Los Angeles Kings	Pittsburgh Penguins
July 29, 2010	Mike Vernace	Tampa Bay Lightning	San Jose Sharks
July 29, 2010	Mathieu Roy	Tampa Bay Lightning	Florida Panthers
July 30, 2010	Dominic Moore	Tampa Bay Lightning	Montreal Canadiens
July 31, 2010	Alexandre Picard	Montreal Canadiens	Carolina Hurricanes
August 2, 2010	Marty Turco	Chicago Blackhawks	Dallas Stars
August 2, 2010	Andy Sutton	Anaheim Ducks	Ottawa Senators
August 2, 2010	Shaone Morrisonn	Buffalo Sabres	Washington Capitals
August 3, 2010	Mike Angelidis	Tampa Bay Lightning	Carolina Hurricanes
August 3, 2010	Mike Weaver	Florida Panthers	St. Louis Blues
August 3, 2010	Joe Callahan	Florida Panthers	San Jose Sharks
August 4, 2010	Hugh Jessiman	Chicago Blackhawks	Nashville Predators
August 4, 2010	Dave Scatchard	St. Louis Blues	Nashville Predators
August 4, 2010	Francis Lessard	Ottawa Senators	Phoenix Coyotes
August 4, 2010	David Hale	Ottawa Senators	Tampa Bay Lightning
August 4, 2010	Jamal Mayers	San Jose Sharks	Calgary Flames
August 5, 2010	Mike Modano	Detroit Red Wings	Dallas Stars
August 5, 2010	Andre Benoit	Ottawa Senators	Montreal Canadiens
August 6, 2010	John Madden	Minnesota Wild	Chicago Blackhawks
August 9, 2010	Ruslan Salei	Detroit Red Wings	Colorado Avalanche
August 11, 2010	Dean Arsene	St. Louis Blues	Edmonton Oilers
August 17, 2010	Sean Bergenheim	Tampa Bay Lightning	New York Islanders
August 18, 2010	Ben Guite	Columbus Blue Jackets	Nashville Predators
August 18, 2010	Andy Hilbert	New York Islanders	Minnesota Wild
August 19, 2010	Freddy Meyer	Atlanta Thrashers	New York Islanders
August 19, 2010	Andrew Peters	Florida Panthers	New Jersey Devils
August 20, 2010	Arron Asham	Pittsburgh Penguins	Philadelphia Flyers
August 24, 2010	Fernando Pisani	Chicago Blackhawks	Edmonton Oilers
August 25, 2010	Raffi Torres	Vancouver Canucks	Buffalo Sabres
August 25, 2010	Willie Mitchell	Los Angeles Kings	Vancouver Canucks
August 25, 2010	Randy Jones	Tampa Bay Lightning	Los Angeles Kings
August 26, 2010	Colin Stuart	Buffalo Sabres	Calgary Flames
August 28, 2010	Clarke MacArthur	Toronto Maple Leafs	Atlanta Thrashers
August 30, 2010	Tim Kennedy	New York Rangers	Buffalo Sabres
August 31, 2010	Aaron Johnson	Nashville Predators	Edmonton Oilers
September 2, 2010	David Spina	St. Louis Blues	Phoenix Coyotes
September 2, 2010	Antti Niemi	San Jose Sharks	Chicago Blackhawks
September 2, 2010	Bill Sweatt	Vancouver Canucks	Toronto Maple Leafs
September 3, 2010	Mike Comrie	Pittsburgh Penguins	Edmonton Oilers
September 3, 2010	Wyatt Smith	Boston Bruins	Pittsburgh Penguins
September 6, 2010	Fredrik Modin	Atlanta Thrashers	Los Angeles Kings
September 7, 2010	Jeff Halpern	Montreal Canadiens	Los Angeles Kings
September 8, 2010	Nigel Dawes	Atlanta Thrashers	Calgary Flames
September 9, 2010	Ryan Potulny	Chicago Blackhawks	Edmonton Oilers
September 14, 2010	Eric Belanger	Phoenix Coyotes	Washington Capitals
September 16, 2010	Paul Mara	Anaheim Ducks	Montreal Canadiens
September 17, 2010	Patrick O'Sullivan	Carolina Hurricanes	Edmonton Oilers
September 27, 2010	Matt Hendricks	Washington Capitals	Colorado Avalanche
September 28, 2010	Mike Mottau	New York Islanders	New Jersey Devils
October 2, 2010	Jose Theodore	Minnesota Wild	Washington Capitals
October 4, 2010	Ruslan Fedotenko	New York Rangers	Pittsburgh Penguins
October 4, 2010	Brendan Morrison	Calgary Flames	Washington Capitals
October 11, 2010	Andreas Lilja	Anaheim Ducks	Detroit Red Wings
October 11, 2010	Brian McGrattan	Boston Bruins	Calgary Flames
October 12, 2010	Adam Mair	New Jersey Devils	Buffalo Sabres
October 20, 2010	Steve Begin	Nashville Predators	Boston Bruins
November 23, 2010	Michael Ryan	Philadelphia Flyers	Carolina Hurricanes
November 26, 2010	Garnet Exelby	Chicago Blackhawks	Toronto Maple Leafs
December 17, 2010	Ryan Johnson	Chicago Blackhawks	Vancouver Canucks
January 4, 2011	Marc-Andre Bergeron	Tampa Bay Lightning	Montreal Canadiens
January 5, 2011	Jed Ortmeyer	Minnesota Wild	San Jose Sharks
February 7, 2011	Ray Emery	Anaheim Ducks	Philadelphia Flyers
February 12, 2011	Jason Williams	Dallas Stars	Detroit Red Wings
February 26, 2011	Shane Hnidy	Boston Bruins	Minnesota Wild

== Trades ==
=== July ===
July 1, 2010	To Philadelphia Flyers Andrej Meszaros	To Tampa Bay Lightning 2nd-round pick in 2012 (NSH - # 50 - Colton Sissons)^{1}
July 1, 2010	To Atlanta Thrashers Andrew Ladd	To Chicago Blackhawks Ivan Vishnevskiy; 2nd-round pick in 2011 (#50 - Adam Clendening)
July 9, 2010	To New York Rangers Steve Eminger	To Anaheim Ducks Aaron Voros; Ryan Hillier
July 19, 2010	To Tampa Bay Lightning Simon Gagne	To Philadelphia Flyers Matt Walker; 4th-round pick in 2011 (#118 - Marcel Noebels)
July 19, 2010	To New York Rangers Matt McCue	To Anaheim Ducks Tomas Zaborsky
July 22, 2010	To Florida Panthers Marty Reasoner	To Chicago Blackhawks Jeff Taffe
July 28, 2010	To St. Louis Blues Stefan Della Rovere	To Washington Capitals D.J. King
July 30, 2010	To New York Islanders James Wisniewski	To Anaheim Ducks conditional 3rd-round pick in 2011 (#65 - Joseph Cramarossa)^{2}

1. Tampa Bay's acquired second-round pick went to Nashville as the result of a trade that sent Anders Lindback, Kyle Wilson and a seventh-round pick in the 2012 entry draft to Tampa Bay in exchange for Sebastien Caron, a second-round pick in the 2012 entry draft, a third-round pick in the 2013 entry draft and this pick.
2. The condition was the third-round pick was the Islander's choice to send either their own pick or the pick previously acquired from Colorado on June 26, 2010, until June 1, 2011. The selection was for the Islander's own third-round pick.

=== August ===
August 2, 2010	To New York Rangers Todd White	To Atlanta Thrashers Patrick Rissmiller; Donald Brashear
August 3, 2010	To Florida Panthers T.J. Fast	To St. Louis Blues Graham Mink
August 5, 2010	To Florida Panthers Mike Santorelli	To Nashville Predators conditional 4th-round pick in 2011^{1} (#94 - Josh Shalla)
August 16, 2010	To Montreal Canadiens Karri Ramo	To Tampa Bay Lightning Cedrick Desjardins
August 27, 2010	To Toronto Maple Leafs Matt Lashoff	To Tampa Bay Lightning Alex Berry; Stefano Giliati

1. The conditions to this pick are unknown.

=== September ===
September 1, 2010	To Nashville Predators Grant Lewis	To Atlanta Thrashers Ian McKenzie

=== October ===
October 5, 2010	To Nashville Predators Shane O'Brien; Dan Gendur	To Vancouver Canucks Ryan Parent; Jonas Andersson
October 6, 2010	To Vancouver Canucks Andrew Peters	To Florida Panthers Darcy Hordichuk
October 7, 2010	To Vancouver Canucks Nathan Paetsch	To Florida Panthers Sean Zimmerman

=== November ===
November 11, 2010	To Montreal Canadiens Michael Bournival	To Colorado Avalanche Ryan O'Byrne
November 11, 2010	To New York Rangers Chad Kolarik	To Columbus Blue Jackets Dane Byers
November 17, 2010	To Carolina Hurricanes Ian White; Brett Sutter	To Calgary Flames Anton Babchuk; Tom Kostopoulos
November 21, 2010	To Philadelphia Flyers Danny Syvret; Rob Bordson	To Anaheim Ducks David Laliberte; Patrick Maroon
November 23, 2010	To Carolina Hurricanes Ryan Carter	To Anaheim Ducks Stefan Chaput; Matt Kennedy
November 23, 2010	To Anaheim Ducks Nigel Williams	To New York Rangers Stu Bickel
November 29, 2010	To Boston Bruins Colby Cohen	To Colorado Avalanche Matt Hunwick
November 30, 2010	To Washington Capitals Scott Hannan	To Colorado Avalanche Tomas Fleischmann

=== December ===
December 9, 2010	To Tampa Bay Lightning Levi Nelson	To Boston Bruins Juraj Simek
December 9, 2010	To Florida Panthers Jeff LoVecchio; Jordan Knackstedt	To Boston Bruins Sean Zimmerman conditional 7th-round pick in 2011^{1}
December 11, 2010	To Los Angeles Kings Marco Sturm	To Boston Bruins future considerations
December 28, 2010	To Montreal Canadiens James Wisniewski	To New York Islanders 2nd-round pick in 2011 (#31 - Johan Sundstrom) conditional pick in 2012^{2}
December 31, 2010	To Anaheim Ducks Maxim Lapierre	To Montreal Canadiens Brett Festerling; 5th-round pick in 2012 (ANA - # 127 - Brian Cooper)^{3}

1. Conditions of this draft pick are unknown. Boston made no pick selection belonging to Florida in the 2011 entry draft.
2. The conditions of this pick were the Islanders would receive a fifth-round pick if Montreal made the 2011 Stanley Cup playoffs and Wisniewski plays in at least 50% of Montreal's playoff games or a fourth-round pick in the 2013 entry draft if these conditions were not met. Although both conditions were met, Montreal made no pick selection belonging to the Islanders in the 2012 entry draft or 2013 entry draft.
3. Anaheim's fifth-round pick was re-acquired from Montreal as the result of a trade on February 16, 2011, that sent Paul Mara to Montreal in exchange for this pick.

=== January ===
January 1, 2011	To Tampa Bay Lightning Dwayne Roloson	To New York Islanders Ty Wishart
January 4, 2011	To Anaheim Ducks Nate Guenin	To Columbus Blue Jackets Trevor Smith
January 7, 2011	To Dallas Stars Jamie Langenbrunner conditional 3rd-round pick in 2012^{1}	To New Jersey Devils conditional pick in 2011^{2} (3rd-round - # 75 - Blake Coleman) conditional 2nd-round pick in 2012^{3}
January 10, 2011	To Phoenix Coyotes Michal Rozsival	To New York Rangers Wojtek Wolski
January 13, 2011	To Toronto Maple Leafs Fabian Brunnstrom	To Dallas Stars Mikhail Stefanovich
January 18, 2011	To San Jose Sharks Ben Eager	To Atlanta Thrashers 5th-round pick in 2011 (#149 - Austen Brassard)

1. The condition of the pick was if Dallas re-sign Langenbrunner after July 1, Dallas would receive this pick. The condition was not met when Langenbrunner signed with St. Louis on July 6, 2011.
2. The conditions of the pick was if New Jersey would receive a second-round pick if Dallas won a playoff round in the 2011 Stanley Cup playoffs or if Dallas re-sign Langenbrunner before June 25, 2011, Dallas would receive this pick. New Jersey would receive a third-round pick if these conditions were not met. The conditions for a second-round pick were not met when Dallas missed the 2011 Stanley Cup playoffs and Langenbrunner signed with St. Louis on July 6, 2011.
3. The condition of the pick was if Dallas re-sign Langenbrunner after July 1, New Jersey would receive this pick. The condition was not met when Langenbrunner signed with St. Louis on July 6, 2011.

=== February ===
February 9, 2011	To San Jose Sharks Patrick Davis; Mike Swift	To New Jersey Devils Jay Leach; Steven Zalewski
February 9, 2011	To Anaheim Ducks Francois Beauchemin	To Toronto Maple Leafs Joffrey Lupul; Jake Gardiner conditional pick in 2013^{1} (SJS - 4th-round - # 117 - Fredrik Bergvik)^{2}
February 9, 2011	To New York Islanders Al Montoya	To Phoenix Coyotes 6th-round pick in 2011 (#155 - Andrew Fritsch)
February 9, 2011	To Chicago Blackhawks Michael Frolik; Alexander Salak	To Florida Panthers Jack Skille; Hugh Jessiman; David Pacan
February 10, 2011	To Nashville Predators Mike Fisher	To Ottawa Senators 1st-round pick in 2011 (#21 - Stefan Noesen) conditional pick in 2012^{3} (3rd-round - # 82 - Jarrod Maidens)
February 14, 2011	To Philadelphia Flyers Kris Versteeg	To Toronto Maple Leafs 1st-round pick in 2011 (#25 - Stuart Percy); 3rd-round pick in 2011 (#86 - Josh Leivo)
February 15, 2011	To Toronto Maple Leafs Aaron Voros	To Anaheim Ducks conditional 7th-round pick in 2011^{4}
February 15, 2011	To Boston Bruins Chris Kelly	To Ottawa Senators 2nd-round pick in 2011 (#61 - Shane Prince)
February 16, 2011	To Montreal Canadiens Paul Mara	To Anaheim Ducks 5th-round pick in 2012 (#127 - Brian Cooper)
February 17, 2011	To Anaheim Ducks Jarkko Ruutu	To Ottawa Senators 6th-round pick in 2011 (#171 - Max McCormick)
February 18, 2011	To Boston Bruins Rich Peverley; Boris Valabik	To Atlanta Thrashers Blake Wheeler; Mark Stuart
February 18, 2011	To San Jose Sharks Ian White	To Carolina Hurricanes 2nd-round pick in 2012 (#47 - Brock McGinn)
February 18, 2011	To Carolina Hurricanes Derek Joslin	To San Jose Sharks future considerations
February 18, 2011	To Ottawa Senators Craig Anderson	To Colorado Avalanche Brian Elliott
February 18, 2011	To Boston Bruins Tomas Kaberle	To Toronto Maple Leafs Joe Colborne; 1st-round pick in 2011 (ANA - # 30 - Rickard Rakell)^{5} conditional 2nd-round pick in 2012^{6} (DAL - # 54 - Mike Winther)^{7}
February 18, 2011	To Tampa Bay Lightning Eric Brewer	To St. Louis Blues rights to Brock Beukeboom; 3rd-round pick in 2011 (#88 - Jordan Binnington)
February 19, 2011	To Colorado Avalanche Erik Johnson; Jay McClement conditional 1st-round pick^{8} (2011 entry draft - # 11; Duncan Siemens)	To St. Louis Blues Chris Stewart; Kevin Shattenkirk conditional 2nd-round pick^{9} (2011 entry draft - # 32 - Ty Rattie)
February 21, 2011	To Dallas Stars Alex Goligoski	To Pittsburgh Penguins James Neal; Matt Niskanen
February 24, 2011	To Montreal Canadiens Brent Sopel; Nigel Dawes	To Atlanta Thrashers Ben Maxwell; 4th-round pick in 2011 (MTL - # 108 - Olivier Archambault)^{10}
February 24, 2011	To Pittsburgh Penguins Alexei Kovalev	To Ottawa Senators conditional pick in 2011^{11} (7th-round - # 204 - Ryan Dzingel)
February 24, 2011	To Carolina Hurricanes Cory Stillman	To Florida Panthers Ryan Carter; 5th-round pick in 2011 (SJS - # 133 - Sean Kuraly)^{12}
February 24, 2011	To Anaheim Ducks Dan Ellis	To Tampa Bay Lightning Curtis McElhinney
February 25, 2011	To Florida Panthers Alexander Sulzer	To Nashville Predators conditional 7th-round pick in 2012^{13}
February 26, 2011	To New York Rangers Bryan McCabe	To Florida Panthers Tim Kennedy; 3rd-round pick in 2011 (#76 - Logan Shaw)
February 27, 2011	To Anaheim Ducks Brian McGrattan; Sean Zimmerman	To Boston Bruins Stefan Chaput; David Laliberte
February 27, 2011	To Buffalo Sabres Brad Boyes	To St. Louis Blues 2nd-round pick in 2011 (#46 - Joel Edmundson)
February 28, 2011	To Boston Bruins Anton Khudobin	To Minnesota Wild Jeff Penner rights to Mikko Lehtonen
February 28, 2011	To Atlanta Thrashers Brett Festerling	To Montreal Canadiens Drew MacIntyre
February 28, 2011	To Calgary Flames Fredrik Modin	To Atlanta Thrashers 7th-round pick in 2011 (SJS - # 194 - Colin Blackwell)^{1}
February 28, 2011	To Florida Panthers Niclas Bergfors; Patrick Rissmiller	To Atlanta Thrashers Radek Dvorak; 5th-round pick in 2011 (SJS - # 133 - Sean Kuraly)^{2}
February 28, 2011	To Chicago Blackhawks Chris Campoli conditional 7th-round pick in 2012^{3}	To Ottawa Senators Ryan Potulny conditional 2nd-round pick in 2011^{4} (DET - # 48 - Xavier Ouellet)^{5}
February 28, 2011	To New York Rangers John Mitchell	To Toronto Maple Leafs 7th-round pick in 2012 (#209 - Viktor Loov)
February 28, 2011	To Vancouver Canucks Chris Higgins	To Florida Panthers Evan Oberg; 3rd-round pick in 2013 (VAN - # 85 - Cole Cassels)^{6}
February 28, 2011	To Washington Capitals Dennis Wideman	To Florida Panthers Jake Hauswirth; 3rd-round pick in 2011 (#87 - Jonathan Racine)
February 28, 2011	To Carolina Hurricanes Bryan Allen	To Florida Panthers Sergei Samsonov
February 28, 2011	To Edmonton Oilers Kevin Montgomery	To Colorado Avalanche Shawn Belle
February 28, 2011	To Los Angeles Kings Dustin Penner	To Edmonton Oilers Colten Teubert; 1st-round pick in 2011 (#19 - Oscar Klefbom) conditional pick in 2012^{7} (3rd-round - # 91 - Daniil Zharkov)
February 28, 2011	To Philadelphia Flyers Tom Sestito	To Columbus Blue Jackets Greg Moore; Michael Chaput
February 28, 2011	To Anaheim Ducks Brad Winchester	To St. Louis Blues 3rd-round pick in 2012 (#67 - Mackenzie MacEachern)
February 28, 2011	To Vancouver Canucks Maxim Lapierre; MacGregor Sharp	To Anaheim Ducks Joel Perrault; 3rd-round pick in 2012 (#87 - Frederik Andersen)
February 28, 2011	To Washington Capitals Jason Arnott	To New Jersey Devils Dave Steckel; 2nd-round pick in 2012 (MIN - # 46 - Raphael Bussieres)^{8}
February 28, 2011	To Columbus Blue Jackets Scottie Upshall; Sami Lepisto	To Phoenix Coyotes Rostislav Klesla; Dane Byers

1. The condition of this pick was Toronto would receive a fourth-round pick in the 2013 entry draft if Lupul was on Toronto's roster for 40 or more games during the 2012–13 NHL season or a sixth-round pick in the 2013 entry draft if the condition was not met. The condition for a fourth-round pick was converted on April 10, 2013.
2. Chicago's acquired fourth-round pick went to San Jose as the result of a trade on June 30, 2013, that sent a fourth-round pick (#111 overall) in the 2013 entry draft and a fifth-round pick in the 2014 entry draft to Chicago in exchange for a fifth-round pick in the 2013 entry draft and this pick.
  Chicago previously acquired this pick as the result of a trade on June 30, 2013, that sent Dave Bolland to Toronto in exchange for a second-round pick in the 2013 entry draft, a fourth-round pick in the 2014 entry draft and this pick.
3. The condition of this pick was Nashville would receive a third-round pick in the 2012 entry draft if they won one round of the 2011 Stanley Cup playoffs or a second-round pick in the 2012 entry draft if they won more than one series. The condition of the third-round pick was converted on April 24, 2011, but did not win another round.
4. The condition of this pick was Anaheim would receive this pick if Voros re-signs with Toronto prior to the 2011 entry draft. The condition was not met.
5. Toronto's acquired first-round pick went to Anaheim as the result of a trade on June 24, 2011, that sent a first-round pick (#22 overall) in the 2011 entry draft to Toronto in exchange for a second-round pick in the 2011 entry draft and this pick.
6. The conditions were that Toronto would receive this pick if Boston reached the 2011 Stanley Cup Finals or that Kaberle re-signs with Boston after 2010–11 NHL season. One of the conditions was met when Boston reached the finals on May 27, 2011.
7. Washington's acquired second-round pick went to Dallas as the result of a trade on June 22, 2012, that sent Mike Ribeiro to Washington in exchange for Cody Eakin and this pick.
  Washington previously acquired this pick as the result of a trade on July 1, 2011, that sent Semyon Varlamov to Colorado in exchange for a first-round pick in the 2012 entry draft and a Washington choice of a second-round pick in the 2012 entry draft (this pick) or 2013 entry draft. Washington opted to take this pick on June 15, 2012.
  Colorado previously acquired this pick as the result of a trade on June 24, 2011, that sent John-Michael Liles to Toronto in exchange for this pick.
8. The condition of this pick was for a first-round pick in the 2011 entry draft unless St. Louis pick was a top 10 pick in which case St. Louis has the option to defer the pick to the 2012 entry draft.
9. The condition of this pick was for a second-round pick in the 2011 entry draft unless St. Louis pick was a top 10 pick in which case St. Louis has the option to defer the pick to the 2012 entry draft.
10. Montreal's fourth-round pick was re-acquired from Winnipeg as the result of a trade on June 25, 2011, that sent a third-round pick in the 2011 entry draft to Winnipeg in exchange for a fourth-round pick (#97 overall) in the 2011 entry draft and this pick. The Atlanta franchise relocated to Winnipeg on June 21, 2011.
11. The conditions of the pick were Ottawa would receive a sixth-round pick if Pittsburgh advance to the second-round of the 2011 Stanley Cup playoffs and that Kovalev plays at least 50% of games in the first-round. If these conditions were not met, Ottawa would receive a seventh-round pick. The conditions of a sixth-round pick were not met as Pittsburgh were eliminated in the first-round of the playoffs on April 27, 2011.
12. Winnipeg's acquired fifth-round pick went to San Jose as the result of a trade on June 25, 2011, that sent a fourth-round pick in the 2011 entry draft to Winnipeg in exchange for a seventh-round pick in the 2011 entry draft and this pick. The Atlanta franchise relocated to Winnipeg on June 21, 2011.
  Atlanta previously acquired the pick as the result of a trade on February 28, 2011, that sent Niclas Bergfors and Patrick Rissmiller to Florida in exchange for Radek Dvorak and this pick.
13. The condition was Nashville would received this pick if Sulzer re-signs with Florida. The condition was not met when Sulzer signed with Vancouver as a free agent on July 7, 2011.
14. Winnipeg's acquired seventh-round pick went to San Jose as the result of a trade on June 25, 2011, that sent a fourth-round pick in the 2011 entry draft to Winnipeg in exchange for a fifth-round pick in the 2011 entry draft and this pick. The Atlanta franchise relocated to Winnipeg on June 21, 2011.
15. Winnipeg's acquired fifth-round pick went to San Jose as the result of a trade on June 25, 2011, that sent a fourth-round pick in the 2011 entry draft to Winnipeg in exchange for a seventh-round pick in the 2011 entry draft and this pick. The Atlanta franchise relocated to Winnipeg on June 21, 2011.
16. The condition was Chicago would get this pick if Potulny spends at least one day on Ottawa's roster during the 2011–12 NHL season. The condition was not met when Potulny signed with Washington as a free agent on July 1, 2011.
17. The condition of this pick was that Chicago had until 48 hours before the start of the 2011 entry draft to determine if they send their own second-round pick or one of the picks acquired from Atlanta or Calgary to Ottawa. Chicago selected their own pick to transfer to Ottawa on June 23, 2011.
18. Ottawa's acquired second-round pick went to Detroit as the result of a trade on June 24, 2011, that sent a first-round pick in the 2011 entry draft to Ottawa in exchange for a second-round pick (#35 overall) in the 2011 entry draft and this pick.
19. Vancouver's third-round pick was re-acquired from Florida as the result of a trade on October 22, 2011, that sent Mikael Samuelsson and Marco Sturm to Florida in exchange for David Booth, Steven Reinprecht and this pick.
20. The condition of this pick was that Edmonton would receive a second round if Los Angeles won the 2011 Stanley Cup and a third round Los Angeles didn't win. The condition of a third-round pick was met when Los Angeles were eliminated on April 25, 2011.
21. New Jersey's second-round pick went to Minnesota as the result of a trade on February 24, 2012, that sent Marek Zidlicky to New Jersey in exchange for Kurtis Foster, Nick Palmieri, Stephane Veilleux, a conditional third-round pick in the 2013 entry draft and this pick.

=== March ===
March 1, 2011	To Columbus Blue Jackets Petr Kalus	To Minnesota Wild future considerations

=== May ===
May 8, 2011	To New York Rangers Oscar Lindberg	To Phoenix Coyotes Ethan Werek

=== June ===
The 2011 NHL entry draft was held on June 24–25, 2011.

June 1, 2011	To New York Rangers Tim Erixon; 5th-round pick in 2011 (#134 - Shane McColgan)	To Calgary Flames Roman Horak; 2nd-round pick in 2011 (#45 - Markus Granlund); 2nd-round pick in 2011 (#57 - Tyler Wotherspoon)
June 2, 2011	To Washington Capitals Taylor Stefishen	To Nashville Predators conditional 7th-round pick in 2013^{1}
June 7, 2011	To Philadelphia Flyers rights to Ilya Bryzgalov	To Phoenix Coyotes Matt Clackson conditional 3rd-round pick in 2011^{2} (#84 - Harrison Ruopp); 3rd-round pick in 2012 (PIT - #81 - Oskar Sundqvist)^{3}
June 16, 2011	To Minnesota Wild David McIntyre	To New Jersey Devils Maxim Noreau
June 23, 2011	To Columbus Blue Jackets Jeff Carter	To Philadelphia Flyers Jakub Voracek; 1st-round pick in 2011 (#8 - Sean Couturier); 3rd-round pick in 2011 (#69 - Nick Cousins)
June 23, 2011	To Los Angeles Kings Mike Richards; Rob Bordson	To Philadelphia Flyers Brayden Schenn; Wayne Simmonds; 2nd-round pick in 2012 (DAL - #61 - Devin Shore)^{4}
June 24, 2011	To Toronto Maple Leafs 1st-round pick in 2011 (#22 - Tyler Biggs)	To Anaheim Ducks 1st-round pick in 2011 (#30 - Rickard Rakell); 2nd-round pick in 2011 (#39 - John Gibson)
June 24, 2011	To Toronto Maple Leafs John-Michael Liles	To Colorado Avalanche 2nd-round pick in 2012 (DAL - #54 - Mike Winther)^{5}
June 24, 2011	To Florida Panthers Brian Campbell	To Chicago Blackhawks Rostislav Olesz
June 24, 2011	To Ottawa Senators 1st-round pick in 2011 (#24 - Matt Puempel)	To Detroit Red Wings 2nd-round pick in 2011 (#35 - Tomas Jurco); 2nd-round pick in 2011 (#48 - Xavier Ouellet)
June 24, 2011	To Washington Capitals Troy Brouwer	To Chicago Blackhawks 1st-round pick in 2011 (#26 - Phillip Danault)
June 24, 2011	To Minnesota Wild Devin Setoguchi; Charlie Coyle; 1st-round pick in 2011 (#28 - Zack Phillips)	To San Jose Sharks Brent Burns; 2nd-round pick in 2012 (NSH - #37 - Pontus Aberg)^{6}
June 25, 2011	To San Jose Sharks 2nd-round pick in 2011 (#47 - Matt Nieto)	To Florida Panthers 2nd-round pick in 2011 (#59 - Rasmus Bengtsson ) 3rd-round pick in 2012 (PHI - #78 - Shayne Gostisbehere)^{7}
June 25, 2011	To Minnesota Wild 2nd-round pick in 2011 (#60 - Mario Lucia)	To Vancouver Canucks 3rd-round pick in 2011 (#71 - David Honzik); 4th-round pick in 2011 (#101 - Joseph LaBate)
June 25, 2011	To Ottawa Senators Nikita Filatov	To Columbus Blue Jackets 3rd-round pick in 2011 (#66 - T.J. Tynan)
June 25, 2011	To St. Louis Blues Evgeny Grachev	To New York Rangers 3rd-round pick in 2011 (#72 - Steven Fogarty)
June 25, 2011	To Winnipeg Jets 3rd-round pick in 2011 (#78 - Brennan Serville)	To Montreal Canadiens 4th-round pick in 2011 (#97 - Josiah Didier); 4th-round pick in 2011 (#108 - Oliver Archambault)
June 25, 2011	To Los Angeles Kings 3rd-round pick in 2011 (#82 - Nick Shore)	To Nashville Predators 6th-round pick in 2011 (#170 - Chase Balisy); 3rd-round pick in 2012 (#66 - Jimmy Vesey)
June 25, 2011	To Tampa Bay Lightning Bruno Gervais	To New York Islanders future considerations
June 25, 2011	To Winnipeg Jets 4th-round pick in 2011 (#119 - Zachary Yuen)	To San Jose Sharks 5th-round pick in 2011 (#133 - Sean Kuraly); 7th-round pick in 2011 (#194 - Colin Blackwell)
June 25, 2011	To Toronto Maple Leafs 6th-round pick in 2011 (#160 - Josh Manson)	To Anaheim Ducks 6th-round pick in 2012 (#157 - Ryan Rupert)
June 25, 2011	To New York Rangers 6th-round pick in 2011 (#172 - Peter Ceresnak)	To Nashville Predators 6th-round pick in 2012 (#179 - Marek Mazanec)
June 25, 2011	To Phoenix Coyotes Marc-Antoine Pouliot	To Tampa Bay Lightning 7th-round pick in 2011 (#201 - Matthew Peca)
June 25, 2011	To Buffalo Sabres Robyn Regehr; Ales Kotalik; 2nd-round pick in 2012 (#44 - Jake McCabe)	To Calgary Flames Chris Butler; Paul Byron
June 26, 2011	To Edmonton Oilers Ryan Smyth	To Los Angeles Kings Colin Fraser; 7th-round pick in 2012 (DAL - #183 - Dmitry Sinitsyn)^{8}
June 27, 2011	To Minnesota Wild Darroll Powe	To Philadelphia Flyers 3rd-round pick in 2013 (PIT - #77 - Jake Guentzel)^{9}
June 27, 2011	To Florida Panthers Tomas Kopecky	To Chicago Blackhawks 7th-round pick in 2012 or 2013 (2012 - BUF - #204 - Judd Peterson)^{10}
June 28, 2011	To New York Islanders Christian Ehrhoff	To Vancouver Canucks 4th-round pick in 2012 (CBJ - #95 - Josh Anderson)^{11}
June 29, 2011	To Columbus Blue Jackets James Wisniewski	To Montreal Canadiens conditional 5th-round pick in 2012^{12} (#122 - Charles Hudon)
June 29, 2011	To Buffalo Sabres Christian Ehrhoff	To New York Islanders 4th-round pick in 2012 (#103 - Loic Leduc)
June 29, 2011	To Chicago Blackhawks Steve Montador	To Buffalo Sabres conditional 7th-round pick in 2012 or 2013^{13} (2012 - #204 - Judd Peterson)

1. Nashville would receive this pick if Stefishen appears on Washington's reserve list as a signed NHL contracted player for 1 day or more during the 2011–12 or 2012–13 league years. Conditions were not met.
2. Phoenix would receive this pick if Philadelphia re-sign Bryzgalov before the 2011 entry draft. Condition was met when Bryzgalov re-signed with Philadelphia on June 23, 2011.
3. Phoenix's acquired third-round pick went Pittsburgh as the result of a trade on June 22, 2012, that sent Zbynek Michalek to Phoenix in exchange for Marc Cheverie the rights to Harrison Ruopp and this pick.
4. Philadelphia's acquired second-round pick went to Dallas as the result of a trade on February 16, 2012, that sent Nicklas Grossmann to Philadelphia in exchange for a third-round pick in 2013 entry draft and this pick.
5. Washington's acquired second-round pick went to Dallas as the result of a trade on June 22, 2012, that sent Mike Ribeiro to Washington in exchange for Cody Eakin and this pick.
  Washington previously acquired this pick as the result of a trade on July 1, 2011, that sent Semyon Varlamov to Colorado in exchange for a first-round pick in the 2012 entry draft and a Washington choice of a second-round pick in the 2012 entry draft (this pick) or 2013 entry draft. Washington opted to take this pick on June 15, 2012.
6. Tampa Bay's acquired second-round pick went to Nashville as the result of a trade on June 15, 2012, that sent Anders Lindback, Kyle Wilson and a seventh-round pick in the 2012 entry draft to Tampa Bay in exchange for Sebastien Caron, a second-round pick in the 2012 entry draft, a third-round pick in the 2013 entry draft and this pick.
  Tampa Bay previously acquired this pick as the result of a trade on February 16, 2012, that sent Dominic Moore and a seventh-round pick in the 2012 entry draft to San Jose in exchange for this pick.
7. Florida's acquired third-round pick went to Philadelphia as the result of a trade on July 1, 2011, that sent Kris Versteeg to Florida in exchange for a conditional second-round pick in either the 2012 Entry Draft or 2013 entry draft and this pick.
8. Los Angeles' acquired seventh-round pick went to Dallas as the result of a trade on June 23, 2012, that sent a seventh-round pick in the 2012 entry draft to Los Angeles in exchange for this pick.
9. Dallas' acquired third-round pick went to Pittsburgh as the result of a trade on March 24, 2013, that sent Joe Morrow and a fifth-round pick in the 2013 entry draft to Dallas in exchange for Brenden Morrow and this pick (being conditional at the time of the trade). The condition - Pittsburgh will receive the lower of either Edmonton or Minnesota's previously acquired third-round picks, via Dallas - was converted on April 21, 2013.
  Dallas previously acquired this pick as the result of a trade on February 16, 2012, that sent Nicklas Grossmann to Philadelphia in exchange for a second-round pick in the 2012 entry draft and this pick.
10. Chicago's acquired seventh-round pick went to Buffalo as the result of a trade on June 29, 2011, that sent Steve Montador to Chicago in exchange for this pick (being conditional at the time of the trade). The condition, which was carried over from an earlier trade between Chicago and Florida - Florida's seventh-round pick in 2012 would be available - was converted on July 7, 2011, when Alexander Sulzer was signed by the Vancouver Canucks, meaning that a condition of a trade between Florida and the Nashville Predators involving Sulzer and this pick did not come into effect.
11. Vancouver's acquired fourth-round pick went to Columbus as the result of a trade on February 27, 2012, that sent Samuel Pahlsson to Vancouver in exchange for a fourth-round pick in the 2012 entry draft and this pick.
12. The condition - Wisniewski is signed by Columbus for the 2011–12 NHL season - was converted on July 1, 2011.
13. The condition, which was carried over from an earlier trade between Chicago and Florida - Florida's seventh-round pick in 2012 would be available - was converted on July 7, 2011, when Alexander Sulzer was signed by the Vancouver Canucks, meaning that a condition of a trade between Florida and the Nashville Predators involving Sulzer and this pick did not come into effect.

== Waivers ==
Once an NHL player has played in a certain number of games or a set number of seasons has passed since the signing of his first NHL contract (see here), that player must be offered to all of the other NHL teams before he can be assigned to a minor league affiliate.

Date	Player	New team	Previous team
June 30, 2010	Ethan Moreau	Columbus Blue Jackets	Edmonton Oilers
October 5, 2010	Michael Grabner	New York Islanders	Florida Panthers
October 5, 2010	Mattias Ritola	Tampa Bay Lightning	Detroit Red Wings
October 19, 2010	Brendan Mikkelson	Calgary Flames	Anaheim Ducks
November 16, 2010	Troy Bodie	Carolina Hurricanes	Anaheim Ducks
November 23, 2010	Patrick O'Sullivan	Minnesota Wild	Carolina Hurricanes
December 29, 2010	Marek Svatos	Nashville Predators	St. Louis Blues
January 18, 2011	Kyle Wellwood	San Jose Sharks	St. Louis Blues
January 22, 2011	Evgeni Nabokov	New York Islanders	Detroit Red Wings
February 24, 2011	Marek Svatos	Ottawa Senators	Nashville Predators
February 26, 2011	Marco Sturm	Washington Capitals	Los Angeles Kings
February 26, 2011	Nick Boynton	Philadelphia Flyers	Chicago Blackhawks
February 26, 2011	Craig Rivet	Columbus Blue Jackets	Buffalo Sabres
February 28, 2011	Curtis McElhinney	Ottawa Senators	Tampa Bay Lightning
February 28, 2011	Rob Schremp	Atlanta Thrashers	New York Islanders
February 28, 2011	Brett Carson	Calgary Flames	Carolina Hurricanes

== See also ==
- 2010 NHL entry draft
- 2011 NHL entry draft
- 2010 in sports
- 2011 in sports
- 2009–10 NHL transactions
- 2011–12 NHL transactions
