= Stefan Chaput =

Canadian ice hockey player (born 1988)

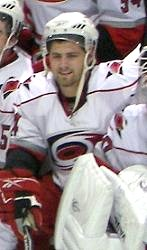
- Born: March 11, 1988 (age 38) Ile Bizard, Quebec, Canada
- Height: 6 ft 0 in (183 cm)
- Weight: 192 lb (87 kg; 13 st 10 lb)
- Position: Centre
- Shot: Left
- Played for: Albany River Rats; Charlotte Checkers; Syracuse Crunch; Providence Bruins; Hamilton Bulldogs; Utica Comets; Ravensburg Towerstars; Dresdner Eislöwen; HDD Olimpija Ljubljana; Löwen Frankfurt
- NHL draft: 153rd overall, 2006; Carolina Hurricanes
- Playing career: 2008–2018

Stefan Chaput (born March 11, 1988) is a Canadian former professional ice hockey centre who played in the American Hockey League (AHL).

== Playing career ==
Chaput played his junior hockey in the Quebec Major Junior Hockey League for the Lewiston Maineiacs. Drafted by the Carolina Hurricanes 153rd overall in the 2006 NHL entry draft he was signed to an entry-level contract with the Hurricanes on April 16, 2008.

After starting the 2010–11 season with Carolina's AHL affiliate, the Charlotte Checkers, on November 23, 2010, Chaput was traded from the Hurricanes to the Anaheim Ducks, along with Matt Kennedy, in exchange for Ryan Carter. He was then immediately assigned to remain in the AHL with the Syracuse Crunch. After 27 games with the Crunch, Chaput was again traded by the Ducks along with David Laliberte to the Boston Bruins in exchange for Brian McGrattan and Sean Zimmerman on February 27, 2011.

On September 18, 2012, Chaput was signed to a one-year deal with the Hamilton Bulldogs of the AHL.

On November 14, 2013, Chaput signed a professional tryout contract (PTO) with the Utica Comets of the AHL after starting the season with the Cornwall River Kings of the semi-professional LNAH. Chaput played three games with the Comets before departing for Europe in signing for the remainder of the season with DEL2 club, Ravensburg Towerstars.

On July 16, 2014, Chaput opted to remain in Germany, signing a contract with DEL2 rival, Dresdner Eislöwen. He assumed a role on Dresdner's top scoring line and completed his one-year tenure in the 2014–15 season, with 54 points in 43 games.

As a free agent on August 17, 2015, Chaput signed in the neighbouring Austrian EBEL, agreeing to a one-year deal with Slovenian club HDD Olimpija Ljubljana.

In the last two seasons of his playing career, Chaput returned to Canada, playing with Jonquière Marquis of the Ligue Nord-Américaine de Hockey (LNAH).

== Personal life ==
His younger brother, Michael Chaput, currently plays for the Arizona Coyotes, and his father, Alain, once served as governor for the now-defunct Lewiston Maineiacs franchise .

== Career statistics ==
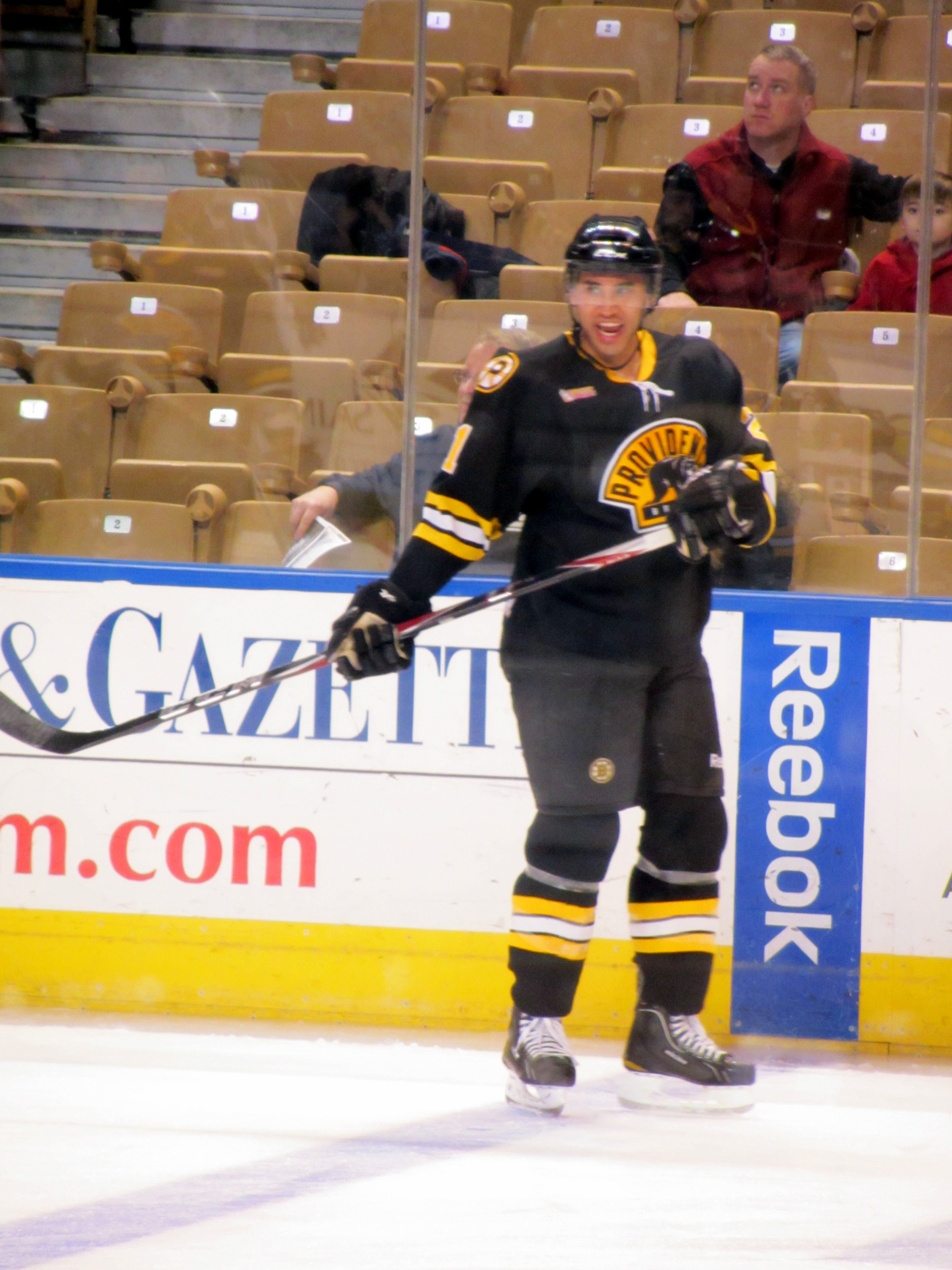
Chaput with the Providence Bruins in 2012.

=== Regular season and playoffs ===
			Regular season					Playoffs
Season	Team	League	GP	G	A	Pts	PIM	GP	G	A	Pts	PIM
2003–04	West Island Lions	QMAAA	29	7	12	19	32	—	—	—	—	—
2004–05	West Island Lions	QMAAA	39	29	26	55	86	5	2	2	4	14
2004–05	Lewiston Maineiacs	QMJHL	8	2	3	5	2	8	1	0	1	2
2005–06	Lewiston Maineiacs	QMJHL	69	19	29	48	44	6	0	1	1	4
2006–07	Lewiston Maineiacs	QMJHL	57	17	29	46	43	17	6	5	11	20
2007–08	Lewiston Maineiacs	QMJHL	62	33	36	69	56	6	2	1	3	12
2007–08	Albany River Rats	AHL	1	0	0	0	0	—	—	—	—	—
2008–09	Albany River Rats	AHL	15	4	7	11	10	—	—	—	—	—
2009–10	Albany River Rats	AHL	75	10	28	38	18	2	0	1	1	2
2010–11	Charlotte Checkers	AHL	20	0	3	3	9	—	—	—	—	—
2010–11	Syracuse Crunch	AHL	27	3	4	7	6	—	—	—	—	—
2010–11	Providence Bruins	AHL	15	3	3	6	4	—	—	—	—	—
2011–12	Providence Bruins	AHL	11	4	1	5	4	—	—	—	—	—
2012–13	Wheeling Nailers	ECHL	15	3	6	9	8	—	—	—	—	—
2012–13	Hamilton Bulldogs	AHL	48	5	12	17	25	—	—	—	—	—
2013–14	Cornwall River Kings	LNAH	2	0	1	1	0	—	—	—	—	—
2013–14	Utica Comets	AHL	3	0	0	0	0	—	—	—	—	—
2013–14	Ravensburg Towerstars	DEL2	16	9	11	20	22	5	1	4	5	6
2014–15	Dresdner Eislöwen	DEL2	43	20	34	54	24	3	0	1	1	55
2015–16	HDD Olimpija Ljubljana	AUT	19	2	7	9	16	—	—	—	—	—
2015–16	Löwen Frankfurt	DEL2	27	8	13	21	20	—	—	—	—	—
2016–17	Jonquière Marquis	LNAH	31	8	31	39	14	13	5	13	18	6
2017–18	Jonquière Marquis	LNAH	20	2	19	21	17	—	—	—	—	—
AHL totals			215	29	58	87	76	2	0	1	1	2

=== International ===
Year	Team	Event	Result	GP	G	A	Pts	PIM
2005	Canada Quebec	U17	9th	5	3	3	6	4
2006	Canada	WJC18	4th	7	0	1	1	2
Junior totals				12	3	4	7	6
