= Brian McGrattan =

Canadian ice hockey player (born 1981)

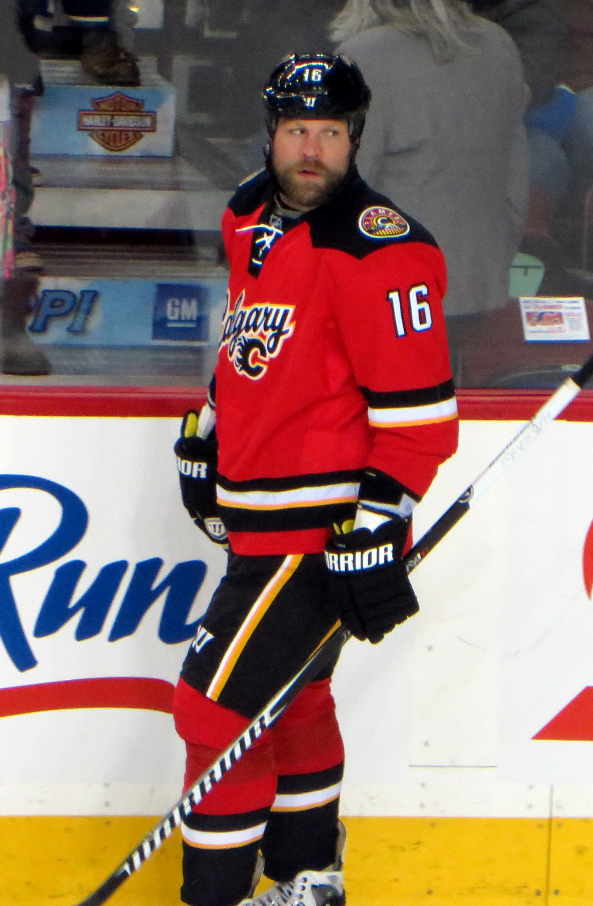
- McGrattan with the Calgary Flames in March 2014
- Born: September 2, 1981 (age 44) Hamilton, Ontario, Canada
- Height: 6 ft 4 in (193 cm)
- Weight: 240 lb (109 kg; 17 st 2 lb)
- Position: Right wing
- Shot: Right
- Played for: Ottawa Senators; Phoenix Coyotes; Calgary Flames; Nashville Predators; Nottingham Panthers
- NHL draft: 104th overall, 1999; Los Angeles Kings
- Playing career: 2002–2017

Brian McGrattan (born September 2, 1981) is a Canadian former professional ice hockey player and former member of the Calgary Flames player development staff. McGrattan was a fourth-round selection of the Los Angeles Kings (104th overall) at the 1999 NHL entry draft but never signed with the team. He signed with the Ottawa Senators organization in 2002 and made his NHL debut with the team three years later. McGrattan has also played in the NHL with the Phoenix Coyotes, Nashville Predators and Calgary Flames. As a career journeyman, he was also a member of five American Hockey League (AHL) teams, and ended his career in 2017 in England as a member of the Nottingham Panthers of the Elite Ice Hockey League (EIHL).

An enforcer, he holds the AHL record for most penalty minutes in one season with 551, set in 2004–05 with the Binghamton Senators. McGrattan overcame an alcohol abuse problem that plagued him early in his career and has become a lead member of the NHL's substance abuse program and mentor to fellow players. Upon the conclusion of his playing career, McGrattan rejoined the Calgary Flames in a player development role.

== Playing career ==
=== Junior ===
A native of Hamilton, Ontario, McGrattan played minor hockey in the city where he was one of his teams' best scorers before moving to Toronto to play bantam and junior hockey. He played five seasons in the Ontario Hockey League (OHL) between 1997 and 2002. He appeared in 25 games with the Guelph Storm in 1997–98, and although he did not appear in any playoff games, he was a member of the Storm's J. Ross Robertson Cup winning team as OHL champions. After only six games with Guelph the following season, McGrattan was sent to the Sudbury Wolves where he recorded 153 penalties in minutes (PIM) in 53 games to go along with 17 points. He followed that season up by scoring 32 points and recording 245 PIM in 1999–2000 in a season split between Sudbury and the Mississauga IceDogs.

Playing the entire 2000–01 season with Mississauga, McGrattan led the IceDogs with 20 goals despite playing only 31 games. He missed the majority of the season after suffering a knee injury in a January 1, 2001, game against the Kingston Frontenacs. He began the 2001–02 OHL season as Mississauga's captain, but was traded to the Owen Sound Attack in October 2001, then to the Oshawa Generals a few days later. He was traded again, to the Sault Ste. Marie Greyhounds in January 2002. Split between the four teams, McGrattan appeared in 60 games, scored 20 goals and 35 points, and had 159 PIM.

=== Ottawa Senators ===
McGrattan was selected by the Los Angeles Kings in the fourth round, 104th overall, of the 1999 NHL entry draft, but the Kings opted not to sign him to a contract following his knee injury. He attended the Detroit Red Wings' development camp prior to the 2001–02 season, before signing a contract with the Ottawa Senators on June 2, 2002. He spent three seasons in the American Hockey League (AHL) with Ottawa's affiliate, the Binghamton Senators. McGrattan scored his first professional point on October 11, 2002, against the Bridgeport Sound Tigers; an assist on a Jeff Ulmer goal that also stood as the first goal in Binghamton's history.

Due to his size, McGrattan believed his best chance of making it to the NHL was as an enforcer. Dennis Bonvie, the all-time penalty leader in professional hockey, taught him to be a better fighter while the two were teammates in Binghamton. After posting 173 PIM in 2002–03, McGrattan finished second in the AHL with 327 in 2003–04. He then set an AHL single-season record for penalties with 551 in 2004–05.

Having established himself as an enforcer, and with the Senators seeking to add physical toughness to their lineup, McGrattan earned a spot on Ottawa's roster for the 2005–06 season. He appeared in 60 games with Ottawa where he recorded five points and 141 PIM. McGrattan scored his first NHL goal on November 19, 2005, against goaltender Martin Brodeur of the New Jersey Devils, and led the league with 19 fights. His most famous battle came against Tie Domi of the Toronto Maple Leafs. McGrattan knocked his opponent down with one punch, which the Toronto Star called Domi's "most decisive loss in 10 years".

His role with the team diminished over the following two seasons, as McGrattan appeared in only 45 games in 2006–07 and 38 in 2007–08. He had only five points and 146 PIM combined between the two seasons. McGrattan made headlines midway through the 2007–08 campaign when he fought teammate and goaltender Ray Emery – himself a noted fighter – in practice. McGrattan's on-ice performance had suffered over time in Ottawa as a result of a worsening drinking problem he had developed beginning early in his career with Binghamton.

=== Phoenix, Calgary and Nashville ===
The Senators struggled late in the 2007–08 season, leading general manager Bryan Murray to make changes to the team. Both Emery and McGrattan were sent from Ottawa in separate transactions. McGrattan, a pending free agent, was traded to the Phoenix Coyotes on June 25, 2008, in exchange for a fifth-round draft pick in the 2009 NHL entry draft. The Coyotes subsequently signed him to a one-year contract for the 2008–09 season. However, he played only three games with Phoenix before he voluntarily entered the league's substance abuse program. McGrattan's struggles with alcohol abuse reached its lowest point and he spent over two months at an Arizona rehab centre as he worked toward changing his life. He returned to the Coyotes late in the season but played only two additional games before he suffered a shoulder injury that required surgery to repair.

McGrattan was six months sober when he signed with the Calgary Flames for the 2009–10 season. He recorded his first career "Gordie Howe hat trick" – a goal, assist and fight – on October 16, 2009, in a 5–3 victory over the Vancouver Canucks, scoring against goaltender Roberto Luongo, assisting on a goal by Dustin Boyd and getting in a fight with Tanner Glass. The goal was his first NHL marker in three years. He added only two assists to finish with four points in 34 games. McGrattan also fought 14 times and was allowed to go to free agency following the season.

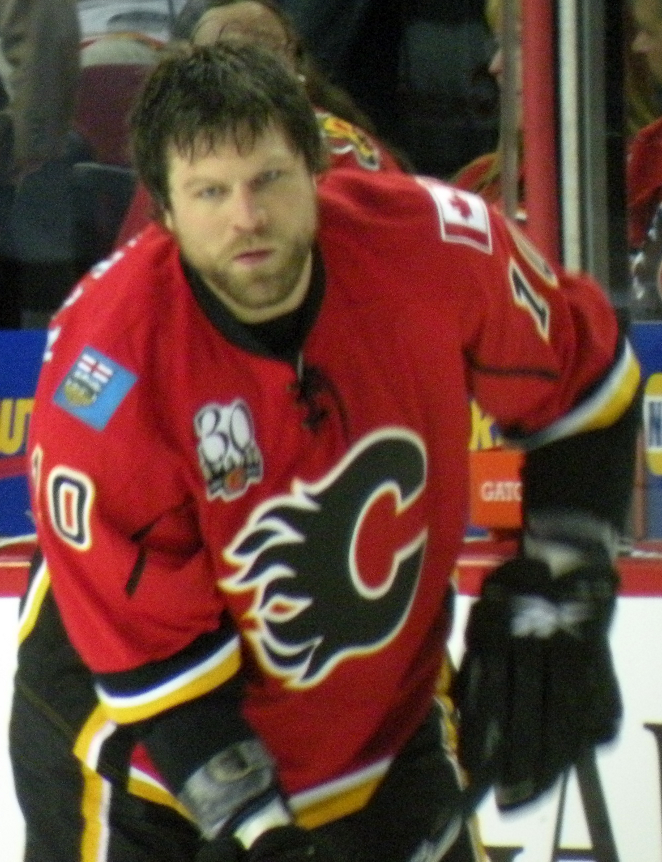
McGrattan during his first tenure with Calgary in October 2009

McGrattan attended the Boston Bruins camp on a try-out basis, and earned a one-year contract with the team. He was assigned to the Providence Bruins to begin the 2010–11 season and spent the entire campaign in the AHL. The Bruins traded him to the Anaheim Ducks, along with Sean Zimmerman, in exchange for David Laliberte and Stefan Chaput on February 27, 2011. He was assigned to the Syracuse Crunch, where he set a franchise record for shots in one game with 13 in a March 12 game against the Rochester Americans. McGrattan scored 10 goals combined between Providence and Syracuse, the highest single-season total of his AHL career.

After beginning the 2011–12 NHL season in the Ducks' organization, McGrattan was claimed off waivers by the Nashville Predators on October 11, 2011. The transaction resurrected his NHL career and earned praise from his former teammates who praised him as being a "great guy" and a hard worker. McGrattan appeared in 30 games for Nashville, including his 200th career game on December 8 against the Columbus Blue Jackets. After two games with the Predators in the lockout-shortened 2012–13 season, McGrattan was assigned to the AHL's Milwaukee Admirals.

After only six games in Milwaukee, McGrattan was traded back to the Flames, in exchange for Joe Piskula, on February 28, 2013. McGrattan's positive influence in the locker room as a player always prepared to play was cited as a reason why Calgary re-acquired him. The Flames also expected he would add a physical presence to the team, which he did in his re-debut with the Flames, a 4–2 victory over Vancouver that included several hits and a fight with Tom Sestito – his first NHL fight in over a year. He gave the crowd a salute following the fight, sending the fans into a frenzy and earning a ten-minute misconduct. He finished the season with three goals and 49 PIM in 19 games with the Flames, and earned a two-year contract extension from the team.

McGrattan was a regular in the Flames lineup throughout 2013–14. He set career highs in games played (76), goals (4) and points (8) in a season. He appeared in his 300th NHL game late in the campaign. Though best known for his fighting skills, McGrattan played a prominent role as a peacekeeper during a January 18, 2014, incident between the Flames and Canucks. Vancouver coach John Tortorella, upset over a line brawl between the two teams at the start of the game, attempted to accost Calgary's coach Bob Hartley in the hallway between the two teams' locker rooms during the first intermission. McGrattan stepped between Tortorella and members of the Flames to ensure that the dispute did not develop into a violent altercation.

A league-wide change in philosophy prior to the 2014–15 NHL season favouring speed over strength for a team's role players resulted in the near elimination of the enforcer role. As a consequence, McGrattan appeared in only 8 of Calgary's first 42 games. The team ultimately placed him on waivers, and upon clearing, demoted him to the AHL's Adirondack Flames in mid-January. With Adirondack, McGrattan abandoned fighting and tried to play an all-round game in the hopes of returning to the NHL.

Leaving the Flames organization, McGrattan signed a one-year contract with the Anaheim Ducks, and was subsequently assigned to the AHL's San Diego Gulls for the 2015–16 season. During a January 19, 2016, game against the San Antonio Rampage, McGrattan was knocked unconscious in a fight with Daniel Maggio. The incident, in which he fell face-first to the ice and had to be stretchered off the ice, renewed the debate over the place of fighting in hockey.

After 14 seasons associated with the NHL, McGrattan opted to play the 2016–17 season in England and agreed to a one-year deal with the Nottingham Panthers of the Elite Ice Hockey League (EIHL). In 42 games with the Panthers, he recorded 12 goals and 19 points while adding 138 minutes in penalties. It was the final season of his playing career as in 2017, McGrattan re-joined the Calgary Flames in an off-ice role as a member of the team's player development staff to offer on and off-ice support for the team's players and prospects.

== Personal life ==
McGrattan married his wife Michelle in 2012. His nickname is "Big Ern", after the Bill Murray character "Big Ern McCracken" in the movie Kingpin.

Sober for four years by the time he began his second tenure with the Flames in 2013, McGrattan had also become a mentor and friend to former Nashville teammate Jordin Tootoo in Tootoo's own efforts to overcome similar addictions. McGrattan's experiences led to a desire to help others; he works with the NHL substance abuse program to act as a mentor for others seeking the advice of a fellow player, and plans to spend his off-seasons earning a university degree in addiction counseling. McGrattan is also an advocate for anti-bullying charities and volunteers with Be The Game, a camp that supports underprivileged children.

== Career statistics ==
| | | | Regular season | | | | | Playoffs |
| Season | Team | League | GP | G | A | Pts | PIM | GP | G | A | Pts | PIM |
|---|---|---|---|---|---|---|---|---|---|---|---|---|
| 1997–98 | Guelph Fire | MWJHL | 15 | 4 | 3 | 7 | 94 | — | — | — | — | — |
| 1997–98 | Guelph Storm | OHL | 25 | 3 | 2 | 5 | 11 | — | — | — | — | — |
| 1998–99 | Guelph Storm | OHL | 6 | 1 | 3 | 4 | 15 | — | — | — | — | — |
| 1998–99 | Sudbury Wolves | OHL | 53 | 7 | 10 | 17 | 153 | 4 | 0 | 0 | 0 | 8 |
| 1999–2000 | Sudbury Wolves | OHL | 25 | 2 | 8 | 10 | 79 | — | — | — | — | — |
| 1999–2000 | Mississauga Ice Dogs | OHL | 42 | 9 | 13 | 22 | 166 | — | — | — | — | — |
| 2000–01 | Mississauga Ice Dogs | OHL | 31 | 20 | 9 | 29 | 83 | — | — | — | — | — |
| 2001–02 | Mississauga Ice Dogs | OHL | 7 | 2 | 3 | 5 | 16 | — | — | — | — | — |
| 2001–02 | Owen Sound Attack | OHL | 2 | 0 | 0 | 0 | 0 | — | — | — | — | — |
| 2001–02 | Oshawa Generals | OHL | 25 | 10 | 5 | 15 | 72 | — | — | — | — | — |
| 2001–02 | Sault Ste. Marie Greyhounds | OHL | 26 | 8 | 7 | 15 | 71 | 6 | 2 | 0 | 2 | 20 |
| 2002–03 | Binghamton Senators | AHL | 59 | 9 | 10 | 19 | 173 | 1 | 0 | 0 | 0 | 0 |
| 2003–04 | Binghamton Senators | AHL | 66 | 9 | 11 | 20 | 327 | 1 | 0 | 0 | 0 | 0 |
| 2004–05 | Binghamton Senators | AHL | 71 | 7 | 1 | 8 | 551 | 6 | 0 | 2 | 2 | 28 |
| 2005–06 | Ottawa Senators | NHL | 60 | 2 | 3 | 5 | 141 | — | — | — | — | — |
| 2006–07 | Ottawa Senators | NHL | 45 | 0 | 2 | 2 | 100 | — | — | — | — | — |
| 2007–08 | Ottawa Senators | NHL | 38 | 0 | 3 | 3 | 46 | — | — | — | — | — |
| 2008–09 | Phoenix Coyotes | NHL | 5 | 0 | 0 | 0 | 22 | — | — | — | — | — |
| 2008–09 | San Antonio Rampage | AHL | 1 | 0 | 0 | 0 | 2 | — | — | — | — | — |
| 2009–10 | Calgary Flames | NHL | 34 | 1 | 3 | 4 | 86 | — | — | — | — | — |
| 2010–11 | Providence Bruins | AHL | 39 | 4 | 1 | 5 | 97 | — | — | — | — | — |
| 2010–11 | Syracuse Crunch | AHL | 20 | 6 | 4 | 10 | 56 | — | — | — | — | — |
| 2011–12 | Nashville Predators | NHL | 30 | 0 | 2 | 2 | 61 | — | — | — | — | — |
| 2012–13 | Nashville Predators | NHL | 2 | 0 | 0 | 0 | 0 | — | — | — | — | — |
| 2012–13 | Milwaukee Admirals | AHL | 6 | 0 | 0 | 0 | 4 | — | — | — | — | — |
| 2012–13 | Calgary Flames | NHL | 19 | 3 | 0 | 3 | 49 | — | — | — | — | — |
| 2013–14 | Calgary Flames | NHL | 76 | 4 | 4 | 8 | 100 | — | — | — | — | — |
| 2014–15 | Calgary Flames | NHL | 8 | 0 | 0 | 0 | 4 | — | — | — | — | — |
| 2014–15 | Adirondack Flames | AHL | 16 | 1 | 5 | 6 | 25 | — | — | — | — | — |
| 2015–16 | San Diego Gulls | AHL | 58 | 9 | 8 | 17 | 144 | 3 | 0 | 0 | 0 | 2 |
| 2016–17 | Nottingham Panthers | EIHL | 47 | 12 | 7 | 19 | 138 | 2 | 1 | 0 | 1 | 2 |
| NHL totals | | | 317 | 10 | 17 | 27 | 609 | — | — | — | — | — |
| AHL totals | | | 336 | 45 | 40 | 85 | 1379 | 11 | 0 | 2 | 2 | 30 |
