= David Laliberté =

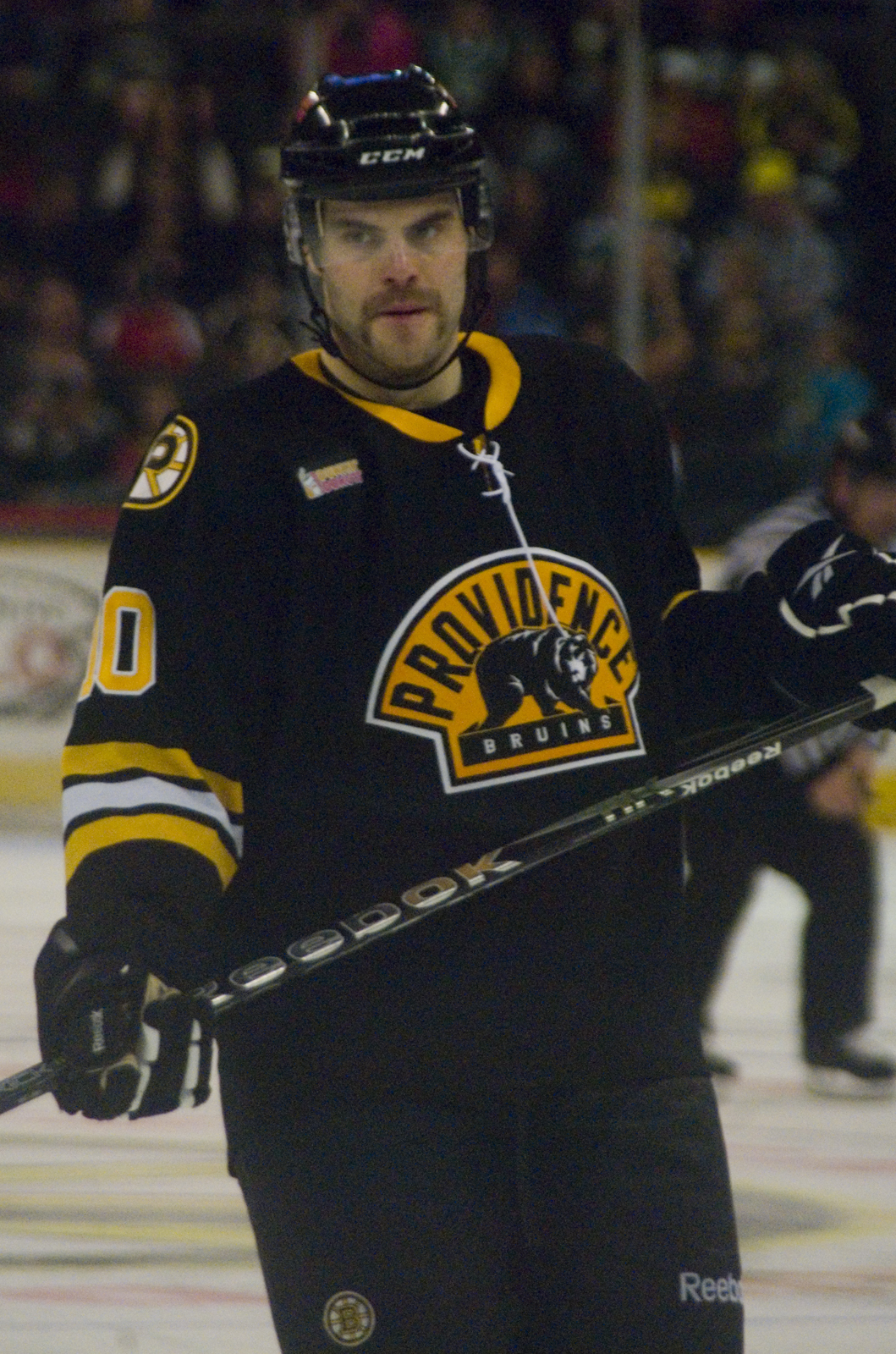
- Laliberté with the Providence Bruins in 2011
- Born: March 17, 1986 (age 40) Saint-Jean-sur-Richelieu, Quebec, Canada
- Height: 6 ft 1 in (185 cm)
- Weight: 198 lb (90 kg; 14 st 2 lb)
- Position: Right wing
- Shot: Right
- Played for: Philadelphia Flyers; Grizzly Adams Wolfsburg; HC Bolzano; Lørenskog IK; HK Nitra
- NHL draft: 124th overall, 2004; Philadelphia Flyers
- Playing career: 2007–2016

David Laliberté (born March 17, 1986) is a Canadian former professional ice hockey player. He played 11 games in the National Hockey League (NHL) while a member of the Philadelphia Flyers during the 2009–10 season.

== Playing career ==
Laliberté started his playing career after being drafted 3rd overall in the Quebec Major Junior Hockey League (QMJHL) Entry Draft by the Montreal Rocket. He quickly became a top player for the team as one of their best offensive forecheckers. After just two years with the Rocket, who relocated to Charlottetown, Prince Edward Island during his time with the club, he was drafted in the fourth round, 124th overall, by the Philadelphia Flyers in the 2004 NHL entry draft.

During the 2004–05 season, Laliberté sustained an inoperable injury to a nerve in his back, which sent pain shooting down his leg, making it difficult for him to walk. The injury caused him to miss a year of playing and doctors said that he would have to tolerate some pain for the rest of his life. He did not return from the injury until December 2005 of the following season. He scored a hat-trick in his first game back and was named team captain, helping lead the underachieving P.E.I. Rocket back into the playoffs after failing to qualify the previous season. Laliberté completed his major junior career in 2006–07 with a QMJHL career-high 50 goals and 89 points in 68 games.

Following the season, Laliberté was technically an unrestricted free agent after not being signed by the Flyers within two years of being drafted, but he signed a three-year, entry-level contract with the team on May 17, 2007. Laliberté split the 2007–08 season between the Flyers' minor league affiliates, the Philadelphia Phantoms of the AHL and the Wheeling Nailers of the ECHL, before spending the entire 2008–09 season with the Phantoms. About a month into the 2009–10 season, Laliberté was called up by the Flyers and scored his first NHL goal and assist against goaltender Michael Leighton of the Carolina Hurricanes in his debut on October 31, 2009, in a 6–1 win.

On November 21, 2010, Laliberté was traded with Patrick Maroon to the Anaheim Ducks in return for forward Rob Bordson and defenceman Danny Syvret. After 29 games with the Ducks AHL affiliate, the Syracuse Crunch, Laliberte joined his third NHL organization for the season when he was dealt by the Ducks, along with Stefan Chaput, to the Boston Bruins for Brian McGrattan and Sean Zimmerman on February 27, 2011.

In July 2011, Laliberté signed a contract with German team Grizzly Adams Wolfsburg of the Deutsche Eishockey Liga, Germany's major hockey league. In 50 games with Grizzly Adams in 2011–12, Laliberte contributed with 20 goals before suffering defeat in the Quarterfinals to end his tenure with Wolfsburg.

In January 2014, he joined Italian based club, HC Bolzano, to begin play in the Austrian Hockey League. In the midst of his second season with Slovak based club, HK Nitra, Laliberté signalled an immediate end to his professional career, citing a serious back injury on November 25, 2016.

== Career statistics ==
			Regular season					Playoffs
Season	Team	League	GP	G	A	Pts	PIM	GP	G	A	Pts	PIM
2000–01	Collège Antoine–Girouard	QMAAA	3	0	1	1	0	—	—	—	—	—
2001–02	Collège Antoine–Girouard	QMAAA	41	21	21	42	14	15	8	9	17	6
2002–03	Montreal Rocket	QMJHL	66	15	14	29	10	6	3	0	3	2
2003–04	P.E.I. Rocket	QMJHL	70	21	22	43	51	11	1	3	4	6
2004–05	P.E.I. Rocket	QMJHL	41	23	13	36	36	—	—	—	—	—
2005–06	P.E.I. Rocket	QMJHL	34	12	11	23	41	6	3	1	4	6
2006–07	P.E.I. Rocket	QMJHL	68	50	48	98	86	—	—	—	—	—
2007–08	Philadelphia Phantoms	AHL	27	3	6	9	13	—	—	—	—	—
2007–08	Wheeling Nailers	ECHL	27	10	14	24	16	—	—	—	—	—
2008–09	Philadelphia Phantoms	AHL	78	28	20	48	43	4	0	1	1	4
2009–10	Adirondack Phantoms	AHL	66	18	28	46	39	—	—	—	—	—
2009–10	Philadelphia Flyers	NHL	11	2	1	3	6	1	0	0	0	2
2010–11	Adirondack Phantoms	AHL	19	3	6	9	20	—	—	—	—	—
2010–11	Syracuse Crunch	AHL	30	5	4	9	32	—	—	—	—	—
2010–11	Providence Bruins	AHL	17	1	5	6	14	—	—	—	—	—
2011–12	Grizzly Adams Wolfsburg	DEL	50	20	10	30	14	—	—	—	—	—
2012–13	Trenton Titans	ECHL	5	1	1	2	2	—	—	—	—	—
2012–13	Adirondack Phantoms	AHL	21	3	8	11	13	—	—	—	—	—
2013–14	Gwinnett Gladiators	ECHL	2	0	0	0	0	—	—	—	—	—
2013–14	HC Merano	INL	9	9	6	15	12	—	—	—	—	—
2013–14	HC Merano	ITA.2	0	0	0	0	0	1	0	0	0	4
2013–14	HC Bolzano	AUT	4	0	1	1	0	13	4	6	10	6
2014–15	Lørenskog IK	NOR	26	13	8	21	39	—	—	—	—	—
2015–16	HK Nitra	SVK	37	19	23	42	18	17	7	14	21	30
2016–17	HK Nitra	SVK	17	6	10	16	18	—	—	—	—	—
AHL totals			250	61	77	138	174	4	0	1	1	4
NHL totals			11	2	1	3	6	1	0	0	0	2

== Awards and honours ==
Award	Year
Slovak Extraliga
Playoffs MVP	2016
