= Nathan Paetsch =

Canadian ice hockey player (born 1983)

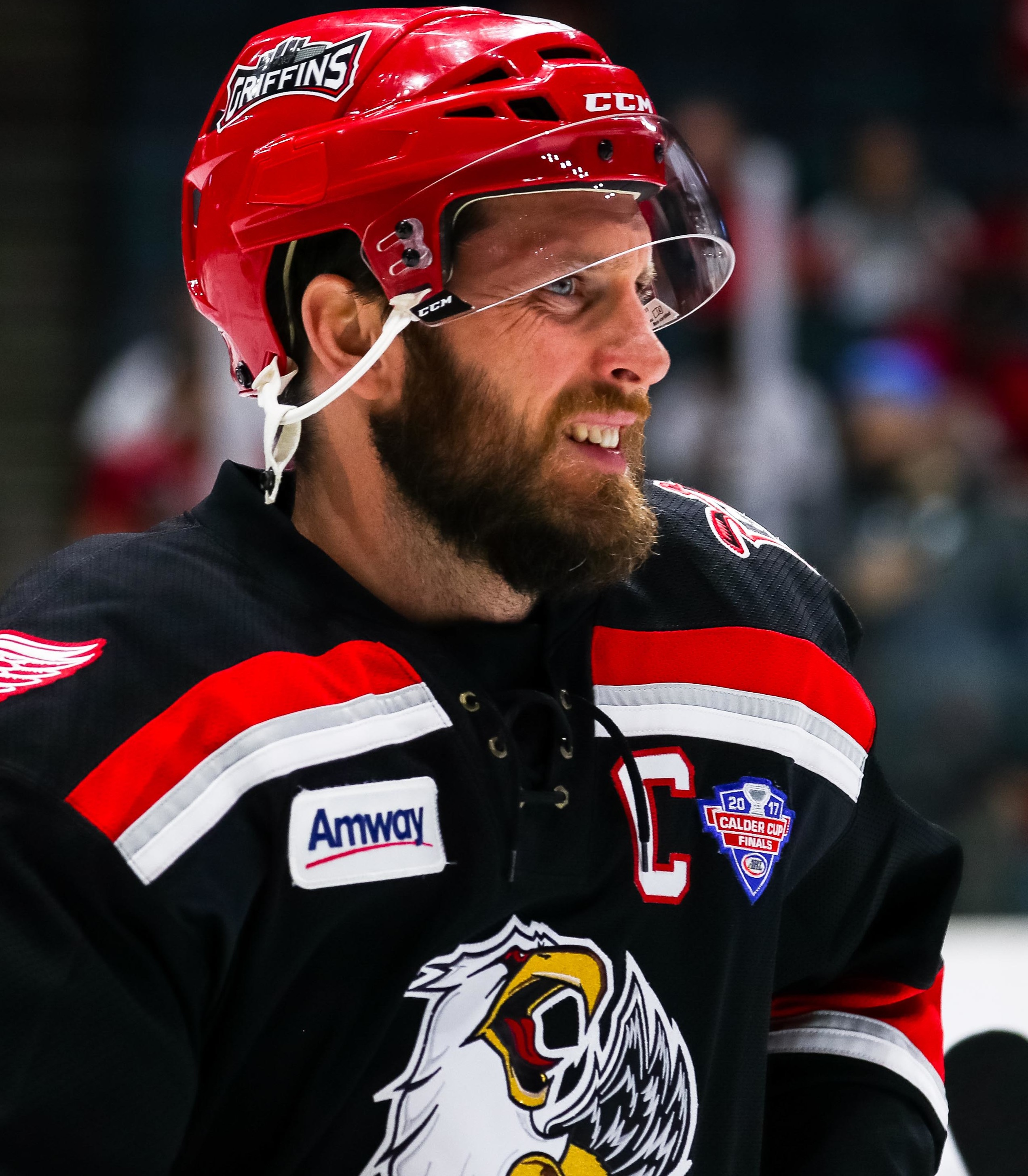
- Paetsch with the Grand Rapids Griffins in 2017
- Born: March 30, 1983 (age 43) Humboldt, Saskatchewan, Canada
- Height: 6 ft 1 in (185 cm)
- Weight: 195 lb (88 kg; 13 st 13 lb)
- Position: Defence
- Shot: Left
- Played for: Buffalo Sabres; Columbus Blue Jackets
- NHL draft: 52nd overall, 2001; Washington Capitals; 202nd overall, 2003; Buffalo Sabres
- Playing career: 2003–2020

Nathan Paetsch (born March 30, 1983) is a Canadian ice hockey coach and former ice hockey defenceman who played in the National Hockey League (NHL) with the Buffalo Sabres and Columbus Blue Jackets. He is currently an assistant coach of the Rochester Americans in the American Hockey League.

== Playing career ==
Paetsch was originally drafted in the 2nd round, 52nd overall, in 2001 NHL Entry Draft by the Washington Capitals. However, the Capitals were unable to reach a contract agreement with him, so he was put back into the draft in 2003. Paetsch was re-drafted in the seventh round, 202nd overall, by the Sabres in the 2003 NHL Entry Draft.

Paetsch stepped into full-time WHL duty with the Moose Jaw Warriors as a 16-year-old in 1999. Paetsch was named Moose Jaw's defenceman of the year and playoff MVP after the 2000–01 season. Paetsch has also played in several national tournaments, including the 2000 Under-17 Championships and the 2000 Under-18 Four Nations Cup. In addition, he played for Team Cherry in the 2001 CHL Top Prospects Game.

Paetsch played his first professional season in 2003–04 with the Sabres AHL affiliate, the Rochester Americans.

During the 2005–06 season, Paetsch played his first NHL game on January 7, 2006, for the Sabres and he recorded his first NHL point. Paetsch was then returned to the Americans, for the remainder of the season. Due to a plethora of injuries to defensemen during the 2006 Stanley Cup Playoffs, he was recalled to the Sabres and made his NHL playoff debut in Game 7 of the Eastern Conference Finals against the Carolina Hurricanes.

After re-signing to a one-year contract on July 14, 2005, Paetsch established himself with the Sabres in 2006–07, playing in a career high 63 games, recording 24 points.

On July 31, 2007, Paetsch was re-signed to a three-year contract with the Sabres.

During the 2009–10 season, Paetsch was limited to a reserve defenseman with the Sabres. On January 4, 2010, Paetsch was placed, and later cleared, on waivers from the Sabres. After 11 games with the Sabres, Paetsch was traded, along with a second round draft pick, to the Columbus Blue Jackets for forward Raffi Torres on March 3, 2010.

On July 7, 2010, Paetsch signed with the Florida Panthers for one year on a one-way contract worth $525,000. Not making the Panthers' squad, he was waived to the Panthers' AHL affiliate, the Rochester Americans. On October 7, his one-way contract was traded to the Vancouver Canucks for defenseman Sean Zimmerman, on a two-way contract. The Canucks then loaned Paetsch and Andrew Peters back to the Americans. On November 1, Paetsch and Peters were removed from the Amerks roster due to curfew violations, with Paetsch moving to the Syracuse Crunch and Peters ultimately retiring.

On June 21, 2011, Paetsch left the NHL to sign a one-year contract in Europe for the 2011–12 season, with EHC Wolfsburg of the German DEL.

On July 9, 2012, Paetsch signed a one-year AHL contract with the Grand Rapids Griffins for the 2012–13 season. Paetsch won the Calder Cup with the Griffins in 2013. On July 9, 2013, Paetsch re-signed a two-year AHL contract with the Grand Rapids Griffins through the 2014–15 season.

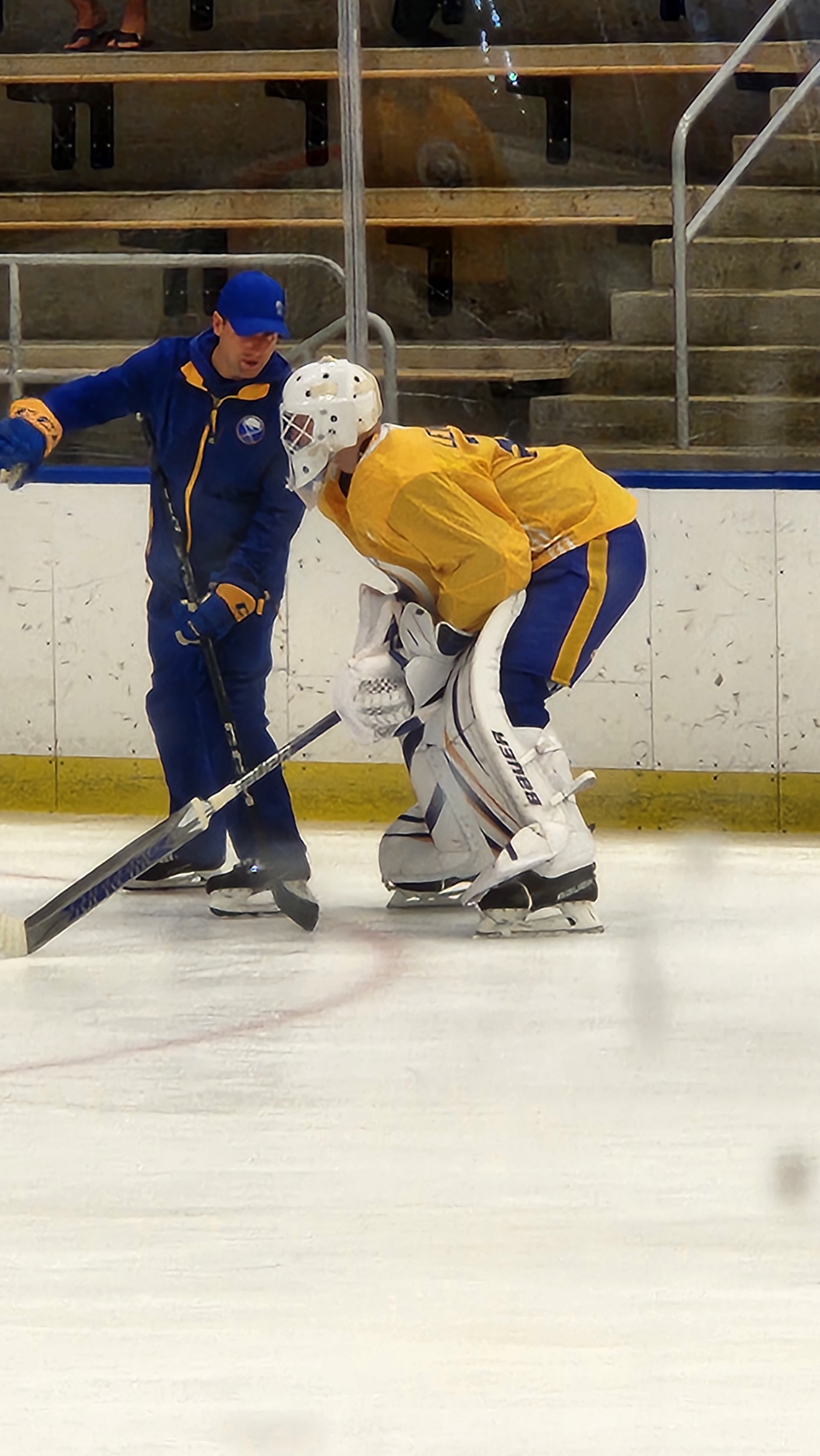
Paetsch (left) coaches Topias Leinonen during Buffalo Sabres Development Camp on July 1, 2024.

During the 2014–15 season, Paetsch eight goals and 30 assists, in 75 games. His 30 assists ranked second on the team, and his 38 points tied for fifth overall on the team and 12th among all AHL defensemen, marking his highest-scoring season since 2005–06 with Rochester.

On July 6, 2015, Paetsch signed a two-year AHL contract with the Grand Rapids Griffins.

After leading the Griffins as captain to their second Calder Cup in the 2016–17 season, before leaving as a free agent after five years with the club. On September 12, 2017, he opted to continue in the AHL in signing a one-year contract in a return to the Rochester Americans.

Paetsch announced his retirement after 17 professional seasons in December 2020.

On July 10, 2023, the Rochester Americans announced the hiring of Paetsch as an assistant coach.

== Personal ==
Paetsch grew up in a town called Leroy, Saskatchewan, but was born in Humboldt since it was the nearest town with a hospital. Paetsch and his wife maintain a home in Spencerport, New York, a suburb of Rochester.

Paetsch has been convicted of gambling-related charges.

== Career statistics ==
=== Regular season and playoffs ===
			Regular season					Playoffs
Season	Team	League	GP	G	A	Pts	PIM	GP	G	A	Pts	PIM
1998–99	Tisdale Trojans AAA	SMHL	44	10	33	43	44	10	1	3	4	37
1998–99	Moose Jaw Warriors	WHL	2	0	0	0	0	1	0	0	0	0
1999–2000	Moose Jaw Warriors	WHL	68	9	35	44	49	4	0	1	1	0
2000–01	Moose Jaw Warriors	WHL	70	8	54	62	118	4	1	2	3	6
2001–02	Moose Jaw Warriors	WHL	59	16	36	52	86	12	0	4	4	16
2002–03	Moose Jaw Warriors	WHL	59	15	39	54	81	13	3	10	13	6
2003–04	Rochester Americans	AHL	54	5	5	10	49	16	1	1	2	28
2004–05	Rochester Americans	AHL	80	4	19	23	150	9	1	1	2	16
2005–06	Rochester Americans	AHL	72	11	39	50	90	—	—	—	—	—
2005–06	Buffalo Sabres	NHL	1	0	1	1	0	1	0	0	0	0
2006–07	Buffalo Sabres	NHL	63	2	22	24	50	—	—	—	—	—
2007–08	Buffalo Sabres	NHL	59	2	7	9	27	—	—	—	—	—
2008–09	Buffalo Sabres	NHL	23	2	4	6	25	—	—	—	—	—
2009–10	Buffalo Sabres	NHL	11	1	1	2	6	—	—	—	—	—
2009–10	Columbus Blue Jackets	NHL	10	0	0	0	6	—	—	—	—	—
2010–11	Rochester Americans	AHL	9	1	2	3	2	—	—	—	—	—
2010–11	Syracuse Crunch	AHL	34	8	9	17	12	—	—	—	—	—
2011–12	Grizzly Adams Wolfsburg	DEL	52	7	18	25	46	2	0	0	0	0
2012–13	Grand Rapids Griffins	AHL	70	4	27	31	32	24	0	11	11	21
2013–14	Grand Rapids Griffins	AHL	68	4	27	31	40	10	0	5	5	4
2014–15	Grand Rapids Griffins	AHL	75	8	30	38	42	16	0	4	4	2
2015–16	Grand Rapids Griffins	AHL	73	4	20	24	26	9	1	2	3	4
2016–17	Grand Rapids Griffins	AHL	73	1	17	18	30	19	2	5	7	8
2017–18	Rochester Americans	AHL	22	0	9	9	16	1	0	0	0	0
2018–19	Rochester Americans	AHL	11	1	2	3	2	—	—	—	—	—
2019–20	Rochester Americans	AHL	10	1	1	2	2	—	—	—	—	—
AHL totals			651	52	207	259	493	104	5	29	34	83
NHL totals			167	7	35	42	114	1	0	0	0	0

=== International ===
Year	Team	Event	GP	G	A	Pts	PIM
2000	Canada Western	U17	5	0	1	1	4
2000	Canada	U18	3	1	0	1	2
2002	Canada	WJC	7	0	1	1	0
2003	Canada	WJC	6	1	0	1	4
Junior totals			21	2	2	4	10

== Awards and honours ==
Award	Year
WHL
CHL/NHL Top Prospects Game	2001
East Second All-Star Team	2003
AHL
All-Star Game	2006
Calder Cup (Grand Rapids Griffins)	2013, 2017
