= Craig Rivet =

Canadian ice hockey player (born 1974)

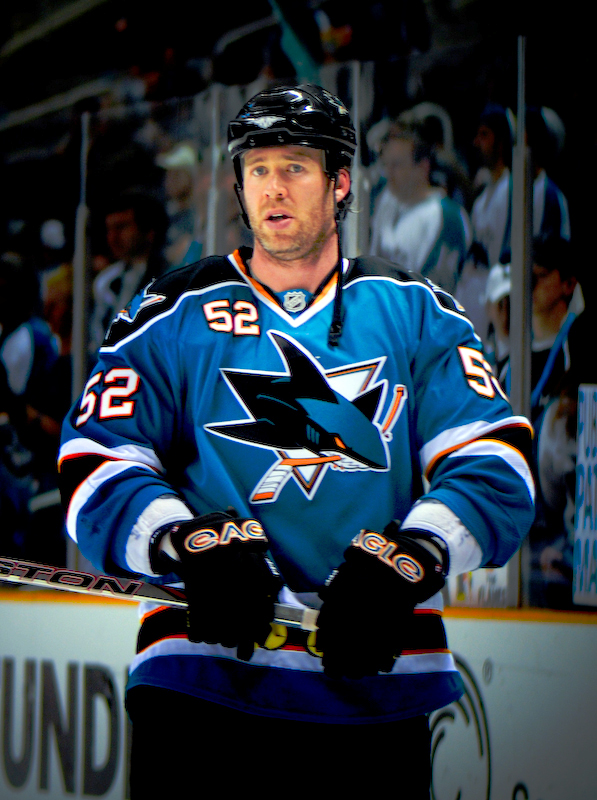
- Rivet with the San Jose Sharks in 2008
- Born: September 13, 1974 (age 52) North Bay, Ontario, Canada
- Height: 6 ft 2 in (188 cm)
- Weight: 207 lb (94 kg; 14 st 11 lb)
- Position: Defense
- Shot: Right
- Played for: Montreal Canadiens; San Jose Sharks; Buffalo Sabres; Columbus Blue Jackets
- National team: Canada
- NHL draft: 68th overall, 1992; Montreal Canadiens
- Playing career: 1994–2012

Anthony Craig Rivet (/ˈrɪvɪt/; born September 13, 1974) is a Canadian former professional ice hockey defenceman who played 18 seasons in the National Hockey League (NHL), including 12 with the Montreal Canadiens. He later played for the San Jose Sharks, Buffalo Sabres, and Columbus Blue Jackets before finishing his career with the Elmira Jackals of the ECHL.

== Playing career ==
=== Junior career ===
Rivet was drafted by the Montreal Canadiens in the 1992 NHL entry draft from the Kingston Frontenacs in the Ontario Hockey League. He was drafted in the third round, 68th overall. Upon being drafted, he recorded junior career highs in 1992–93 with 19 goals, 55 assists, and 74 points. He added 12 points in the playoffs as Kingston advanced to the semi-finals but were eliminated by the Peterborough Petes in five games.

=== Montreal Canadiens ===
After spending his first few professional seasons with Montreal's AHL affiliate, the Fredericton Canadiens, Rivet earned a full-time roster spot with Montreal in 1997–98 and became an alternate captain to Saku Koivu during his time with the team. After a 25-point season with a career-high 8 goals in 2001–02, he re-signed with the Canadiens to a four-year, $12 million contract extension. In 2005–06, Rivet improved to 34 points, his best offensive output with the Canadiens.

=== San Jose Sharks ===
With his contract set to expire at the end of the 2006–07 season, Rivet was traded on February 25, 2007, to the San Jose Sharks with a fifth-round draft pick in 2008 for Josh Gorges and a first-round draft pick in 2007. This pick would later be used to draft former Canadien captain Max Pacioretty. Before becoming an unrestricted free agent in the off-season, he re-signed with the Sharks to a four-year, US$14 million contract, citing San Jose's fan base and competitiveness as major factors in staying with the club. He reportedly chose that offer over San Jose's offer of $12 million over the same time span, but with a no-trade clause. In the first season of his new contract, he recorded a career-high 30 assists and 35 points, topping all team defencemen in scoring (Brian Campbell finished with more points overall during the season, but only scored 19 of his points with San Jose).

=== Buffalo Sabres ===
On July 4, 2008, Rivet was traded to the Buffalo Sabres with a 2010 seventh round draft pick in exchange for two second round selections in the 2009 and 2010 drafts. Before making his 2008–09 debut with the Sabres, he was named team captain on October 8, replacing Jason Pominville, the last to be named captain as part of the Sabres rotating captaincy the previous season. At the end of the 2009-10 season, it was revealed that Rivet's play in the previous two seasons had been hampered by a double labrum tear, for which he would have off-season surgery. Despite initial estimates of 4–6 months for recovery, which would have impinged on the start of the 2010-11 season, he was expected to return for training camp. Despite this, the veteran defenseman announced that the 2010-11 season might be his last in the NHL. Rivet was waived by Buffalo on February 23, 2011.

=== Portland Pirates ===
After clearing waivers on February 24, 2011, Rivet was reassigned to the Sabres' American Hockey League farm team, the Portland Pirates.

=== Columbus Blue Jackets ===
On February 26, 2011, Rivet was claimed on re-entry waivers by the Columbus Blue Jackets.

=== Elmira Jackals ===
On October 10, 2011, Rivet signed a deal with the Elmira Jackals just 6 months after announcing his retirement. He later revealed the move was necessary to obtain his United States permanent residency.

== Career statistics ==
=== Regular season and playoffs ===
			Regular season					Playoffs
Season	Team	League	GP	G	A	Pts	PIM	GP	G	A	Pts	PIM
1990–91	Barrie Colts	CJHL	42	9	17	26	55	—	—	—	—	—
1991–92	Kingston Frontenacs	OHL	66	5	21	26	97	—	—	—	—	—
1992–93	Kingston Frontenacs	OHL	64	19	55	74	117	16	5	7	12	39
1993–94	Kingston Frontenacs	OHL	61	12	52	64	100	6	0	3	3	6
1993–94	Fredericton Canadiens	AHL	4	0	2	2	2	—	—	—	—	—
1994–95	Fredericton Canadiens	AHL	78	5	27	32	126	12	0	4	4	17
1994–95	Montreal Canadiens	NHL	5	0	1	1	5	—	—	—	—	—
1995–96	Fredericton Canadiens	AHL	49	5	18	23	189	6	0	0	0	12
1995–96	Montreal Canadiens	NHL	19	1	4	5	54	—	—	—	—	—
1996–97	Fredericton Canadiens	AHL	23	3	12	15	99	—	—	—	—	—
1996–97	Montreal Canadiens	NHL	35	0	4	4	54	5	0	1	1	14
1997–98	Montreal Canadiens	NHL	61	0	2	2	93	5	0	0	0	2
1998–99	Montreal Canadiens	NHL	66	2	8	10	66	—	—	—	—	—
1999–2000	Montreal Canadiens	NHL	61	3	14	17	76	—	—	—	—	—
2000–01	Montreal Canadiens	NHL	26	1	2	3	36	—	—	—	—	—
2001–02	Montreal Canadiens	NHL	82	8	17	25	76	12	0	3	3	4
2002–03	Montreal Canadiens	NHL	82	7	15	22	71	—	—	—	—	—
2003–04	Montreal Canadiens	NHL	80	4	8	12	98	11	1	4	5	2
2004–05	TPS	SM-l	18	3	1	4	28	6	0	0	0	39
2005–06	Montreal Canadiens	NHL	82	7	27	34	109	6	0	2	2	2
2006–07	Montreal Canadiens	NHL	54	6	10	16	57	—	—	—	—	—
2006–07	San Jose Sharks	NHL	17	1	7	8	12	11	2	3	5	18
2007–08	San Jose Sharks	NHL	74	5	30	35	104	13	0	6	6	16
2008–09	Buffalo Sabres	NHL	64	2	22	24	125	—	—	—	—	—
2009–10	Buffalo Sabres	NHL	78	1	14	15	100	6	1	0	1	11
2010–11	Buffalo Sabres	NHL	23	1	2	3	12	—	—	—	—	—
2010–11	Columbus Blue Jackets	NHL	14	1	0	1	23	—	—	—	—	—
2011–12	Elmira Jackals	ECHL	61	5	19	24	102	10	2	3	5	0
NHL totals			923	50	186	237	1171	69	4	19	23	69

=== International ===
Year	Team	Event	GP	G	A	Pts	PIM
2003	Canada	WC	9	0	1	1	6

== International play ==
Rivet made one international appearance for Team Canada at the 2003 World Championships in Finland. He recorded 1 assist in 9 games as Team Canada captured the gold medal against Sweden 3-2 in the final.

== Post-hockey career ==
Rivet co-hosted "The Instigators" with Andrew Peters on WGR 550 out of Buffalo and MSG Western New York. After stepping down from the show in September 2021, Rivet is currently co-hosting the podcast "After The Whistle" reunited with Andrew Peters.

Preceded by Jason Pominville rotating captaincy ended	Buffalo Sabres captain 2008–11	Succeeded by Jason Pominville
