= Sean Zimmerman =

American ice hockey player (born 1987)

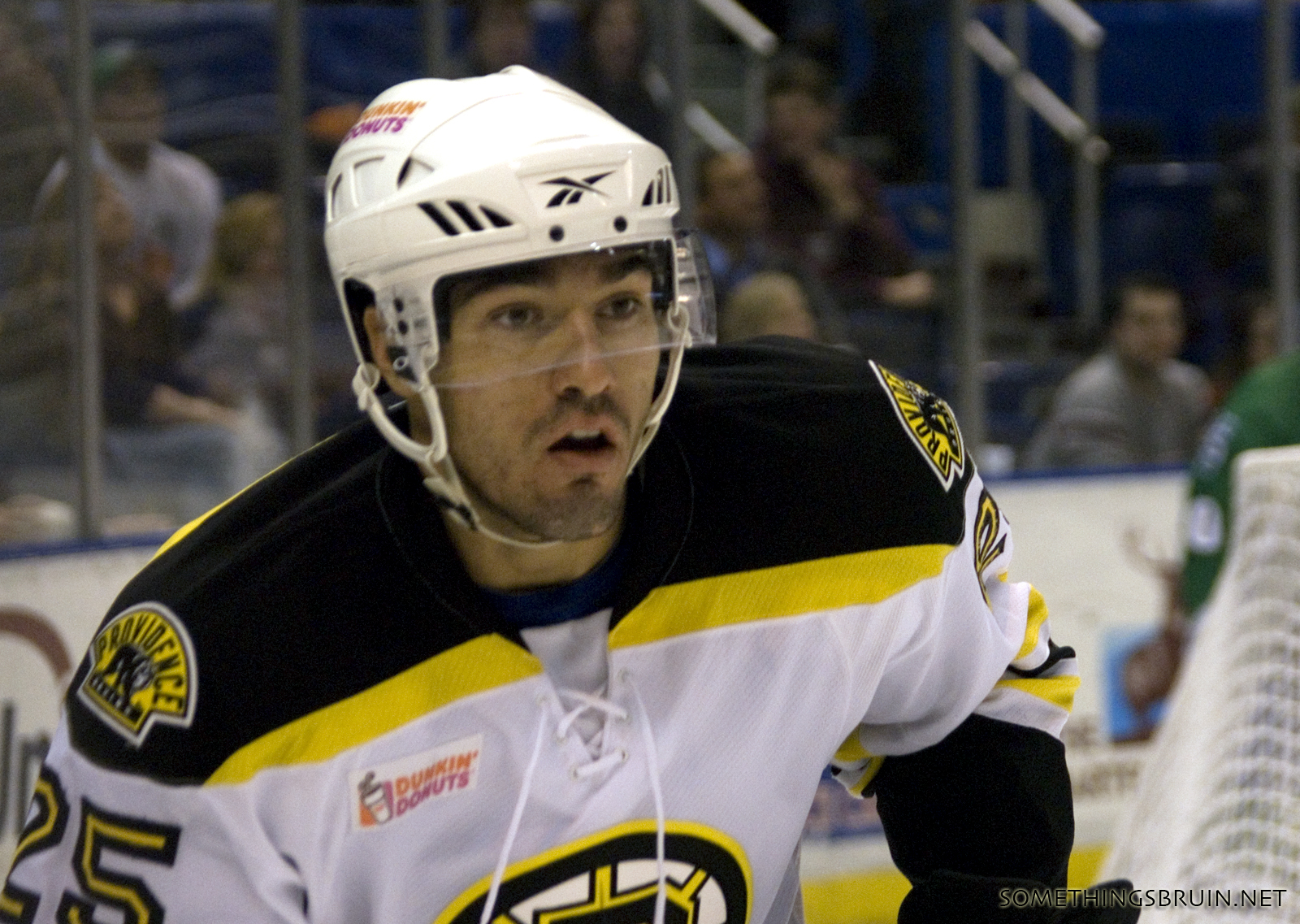
- Zimmerman with the Providence Bruins in 2011
- Born: May 24, 1987 (age 39) Denver, Colorado, U.S.
- Height: 6 ft 2 in (188 cm)
- Weight: 200 lb (91 kg; 14 st 4 lb)
- Position: Defense
- Shot: Right
- Played for: Albany River Rats; Lowell Devils; San Antonio Rampage; Rochester Americans; Providence Bruins; Syracuse Crunch
- NHL draft: 170th overall, 2005; New Jersey Devils
- Playing career: 2005–2018

Sean Zimmerman (born May 24, 1987) is an American former professional ice hockey defenseman. He most recently played for the Orlando Solar Bears of the ECHL. Born in Denver, Colorado Zimmerman represented the United States at the 2007 World Junior Ice Hockey Championships helping Team USA win a Bronze medal.

== Personal life ==
Zimmerman grew up in Littleton, Colorado. Him and his sister, Michelle Zimmerman began playing Ice Hockey in 1995, right after the Colorado Avalanche moved from Quebec to Denver. Zimmerman and his sister played competitive youth hockey in Denver until their parents sent them to Canada for more opportunity.

Zimmerman and his sister moved to Langley, British Columbia in 2000 to attend Delphi Academy, where they could focus on training and school simultaneously. In 2001, Delphi moved to Gold River, British Columbia and turned into Westpointe Collegiate Academy. After the school folded, Zimmerman moved to Spokane, Washington to play Junior B for the Spokane Braves. Zimmerman's younger sister, Michelle, moved to Lake Placid, New York to attend National Sports Academy. She then went on to play Division I hockey for St. Lawrence University on a full ride athletic scholarship.

After playing a few seasons with the Spokane Braves, Zimmerman was drafted to the Spokane Chiefs in the WHL draft.

== Playing career ==
Zimmerman played Major junior with the Spokane Chiefs of the Western Hockey League (WHL). He played four season with Spokane registering 10 goals and 59 points to go with 165 PIMs in 270 games. He is brother of Washington nationals player Ryan Zimmerman He was drafted in 2005 by the New Jersey Devils in the sixth round (170th overall). After seeing time in the Devils farm system he was traded in September 2008 from New Jersey to the Phoenix Coyotes. New Jersey received Kevin Cormier in exchange for Zimmerman. He attended Coyotes training camp that same year, but did not make the team and was assigned to the minor leagues. In the minors he split time between Phoenix's American Hockey League (AHL) affiliate the San Antonio Rampage and their Central Hockey League (CHL) affiliate the Arizona Sundogs. Zimmerman recorded 2 goals and 5 points in 56 games with the two clubs. He again participated in Coyotes training camp the following season, but was once again sent to the minors. He played in 72 games during the year for the Rampage and improved his point total to 9 and added a +13 rating (up from a combined -10 the season before). At the NHL trade deadline Zimmerman, along with a sixth round pick in the 2010 draft, was traded by Phoenix to the Vancouver Canucks in exchange for Mathieu Schneider.

During the off season Zimmerman re-signed with the Canucks organization. However, Vancouver traded him shortly into the season to the Florida Panthers in exchange for Nathan Paetsch. Just two months later on December 9, 2010, Florida traded him and a conditional 7th round pick to the Boston Bruins for Jeff LoVecchio and Jordan Knackstedt. On February 27, 2011, Zimmerman was on the move again for the third time in the season when he was dealt by the Bruins along with Brian McGrattan to the Anaheim Ducks for David Laliberte and Stefan Chaput.

On September 13, 2012, Zimmerman returned to his native state, signing as a free agent with the Denver Cutthroats of the CHL. He played with the team through the 2013–14 season. However, in August 2014, he became a free agent when the team suspended operations, effective immediately.

On September 8, 2014, the Colorado Eagles announced that they had signed Zimmerman.

After helping guide the Eagles as Captain to their first Kelly Cup in his third season with the club in 2016–17, Zimmerman left his home state as a free agent to sign a one-year deal with the Orlando Solar Bears on August 8, 2017.

== International play ==
Medal record

Representing United States

Men's ice hockey

World Junior Championships
Bronze medal – third place	2007 Sweden	

In 2007 Zimmerman represented the United States at the World Junior Championships. In seven games he registered a +1 rating and six PIMs. Team USA defeated Finland in the opening round of the play-offs 6–3, but lost to Canada in their next game 2–1. They rebounded in the bronze medal game to defeat host Sweden 2–1 giving Zimmerman his first and only international medal.

== Career statistics ==
=== Regular season and playoffs ===
			Regular season					Playoffs
Season	Team	League	GP	G	A	Pts	PIM	GP	G	A	Pts	PIM
2002–03	Spokane Braves	KIJHL	45	3	5	8	70	—	—	—	—	—
2003–04	Spokane Chiefs	WHL	67	4	4	8	16	4	0	0	0	0
2004–05	Spokane Chiefs	WHL	71	2	14	16	36	—	—	—	—	—
2005–06	Spokane Chiefs	WHL	72	2	19	21	44	—	—	—	—	—
2005–06	Albany River Rats	AHL	6	0	0	0	4	—	—	—	—	—
2006–07	Spokane Chiefs	WHL	60	2	12	14	69	6	0	2	2	2
2006–07	Lowell Devils	AHL	1	0	0	0	2	—	—	—	—	—
2007–08	Lowell Devils	AHL	66	0	6	6	47	—	—	—	—	—
2007–08	Trenton Devils	ECHL	8	0	1	1	10	—	—	—	—	—
2008–09	San Antonio Rampage	AHL	36	2	0	2	30	—	—	—	—	—
2008–09	Arizona Sundogs	CHL	20	0	3	3	20	—	—	—	—	—
2009–10	San Antonio Rampage	AHL	72	2	7	9	105	—	—	—	—	—
2010–11	Rochester Americans	AHL	7	0	0	0	0	—	—	—	—	—
2010–11	Providence Bruins	AHL	23	0	4	4	23	—	—	—	—	—
2010–11	Syracuse Crunch	AHL	21	0	3	3	24	—	—	—	—	—
2011–12	Syracuse Crunch	AHL	42	1	6	7	39	—	—	—	—	—
2012–13	Denver Cutthroats	CHL	61	0	13	13	77	5	0	0	0	33
2013–14	Denver Cutthroats	CHL	66	3	8	11	112	16	0	4	4	26
2014–15	Colorado Eagles	ECHL	63	0	10	10	116	7	0	0	0	41
2015–16	Colorado Eagles	ECHL	72	2	6	8	196	6	0	0	0	8
2016–17	Colorado Eagles	ECHL	58	1	12	13	168	17	2	1	3	10
2017–18	Orlando Solar Bears	ECHL	52	1	7	8	122	8	0	1	1	43
AHL totals			274	5	26	31	274	—	—	—	—	—
ECHL totals			253	4	36	40	612	38	2	2	4	102

=== International ===
Year	Team	Event	Result	GP	G	A	Pts	PIM
2007	United States	WJC	2nd place, silver medalist(s)	7	0	0	0	6
Junior totals				7	0	0	0	6

- All statistics taken from NHL.com

== Awards and honors ==
Award	Year
ECHL
Kelly Cup (Colorado Eagles)	2017
