= Andrew Peters =

Canadian ice hockey player

- Born: May 5, 1980 (age 46) St. Catharines, Ontario, Canada
- Height: 6 ft 4 in (193 cm)
- Weight: 240 lb (109 kg; 17 st 2 lb)
- Position: Left wing
- Shot: Left
- Played for: Buffalo Sabres; New Jersey Devils
- NHL draft: 34th overall, 1998; Buffalo Sabres
- Playing career: 2000–2011

Andrew Peters (born May 5, 1980) is a Canadian former professional ice hockey left winger. Peters played in the National Hockey League (NHL) for the Buffalo Sabres, and the New Jersey Devils. Throughout his playing career, Peters was best known for his role as an enforcer.

== Playing career ==
Peters was drafted 34th overall by the Sabres in the 1998 NHL entry draft. Besides the NHL, Peters has also played for the Rochester Americans in the AHL, as well as the OHL's Oshawa Generals and Kitchener Rangers.

While on the Rochester Americans, Andrew got into an on-ice fight with his brother Geoff Peters. Andrew has stated in interviews that he did not know it was his brother that he was fighting.

For a short time, both Andrew and Geoff played for the same team (Rochester Americans). During one game, Andrew and Geoff collaborated on a goal. Andrew received an assist while Geoff was credited with the goal. During his time in the AHL, Peters led the league for most penalty minutes at 388.

Peters admitted in 2005 that he used Androstenedione earlier in his career, though there were no rules against it at the time. He stopped using it after the Food and Drug Administration banned its sale in April 2004 and claimed to have not taken the supplement for three years.

Throughout his career Peters has been known more for his rough play than his scoring ability, having not scored a goal between the 03–04 season and February 20, 2007. Peters' goal in the 03–04 season was scored on an empty net. Peters fourth, and next goal would come a little over a year later, February 28, 2008. Less than two weeks later Peters received a one-game suspension for his altercation with New York Rangers forward Colton Orr in which he intervened in a scuffle while on the bench.

On January 6, 2009, Peters was involved in an incident with then Ottawa Senators forward Jarkko Ruutu, in which Peters shoved his glove into Ruutu's face during a skirmish. Ruutu then bit Peters's thumb through the glove, piercing the skin and drawing blood. Peters was called for unsportsmanlike conduct on the play, however Ruutu was suspended the next day for two games.

On September 12, 2009, the New Jersey Devils invited Peters to try out with the team during training camp. On September 25, the Devils signed Peters to a one-way two-year contract worth the NHL's league minimum of US$500,000.

The team placed him on waivers June 30, 2010 and July 2, bought out his contract. He received US$166,667 in compensation in each of the following two seasons from the Devils. Peters signed with the Florida Panthers August 20, 2010, to a two-way, one-year contract worth the NHL's league minimum of US$500,000 and $75,000 in the AHL.

The Panthers traded Peters October 6, 2010, to the Vancouver Canucks for Darcy Hordichuk. The Canucks then immediately loaned Peters and Nathan Paetsch, traded to the Canucks in a separate transaction, to the Rochester Americans. The Amerks suspended Paetsch, Peters and other players on November 1 following a team curfew violation. Paetsch was then loaned to the Syracuse Crunch, however the Manitoba Moose, the Canucks' AHL affiliate, would not accept Peters on its roster, leaving him without a team.

Peters and the Canucks agreed to a mutual release from his contract on February 8, 2011. While Vancouver had asked that he report to the AHL's Manitoba Moose, Peters instead announced his retirement from professional hockey.

== Post-playing career ==
Peters was a contributor to the Sabres Hockey Network and co-hosted the daily talk show The Instigators on WGR Buffalo and MSG Western New York with fellow Sabres alumnus and teammate Craig Rivet. Stepping down from the radio show in September 2021, the pair are currently working together on the podcast After The Whistle, keeping their chemistry and banter, while expanding the scope of the podcast beyond the Sabres.

He also served as head coach of the Buffalo Jr. Sabres' under-15 squad. In March 2017, his team won the New York State Championship and qualified for the National Championship tournament played in Arizona in April 2017.

Andrew Peters is now a coach for the Amherst Knights 10U boys' team.

== Career statistics ==
			Regular season					Playoffs
Season	Team	League	GP	G	A	Pts	PIM	GP	G	A	Pts	PIM
1995–96	Oakville Blades	OPJHL	5	1	2	3	24	—	—	—	—	—
1996–97	Georgetown Raiders	OPJHL	46	11	16	27	105	—	—	—	—	—
1997–98	Oshawa Generals	OHL	60	11	7	18	220	7	2	0	2	19
1998–99	Oshawa Generals	OHL	54	14	10	24	137	15	2	7	9	36
1999–00	Kitchener Rangers	OHL	42	6	13	19	95	4	0	1	1	14
2000–01	Rochester Americans	AHL	49	0	4	4	118	—	—	—	—	—
2001–02	Rochester Americans	AHL	67	4	1	5	388	—	—	—	—	—
2002–03	Rochester Americans	AHL	57	3	0	3	223	3	0	0	0	24
2003–04	Buffalo Sabres	NHL	42	2	0	2	151	—	—	—	—	—
2005–06	Buffalo Sabres	NHL	28	0	0	0	100	—	—	—	—	—
2006–07	Buffalo Sabres	NHL	58	1	1	2	125	—	—	—	—	—
2007–08	Buffalo Sabres	NHL	44	1	1	2	100	—	—	—	—	—
2008–09	Buffalo Sabres	NHL	28	0	1	1	81	—	—	—	—	—
2009–10	New Jersey Devils	NHL	29	0	0	0	93	—	—	—	—	—
2010–11	Rochester Americans	AHL	2	0	0	0	4	—	—	—	—	—
AHL totals			175	7	5	12	733	3	0	0	0	24
NHL totals			229	4	3	7	650	—	—	—	—	—
