= Rob Bordson =

American ice hockey player (born 1988)

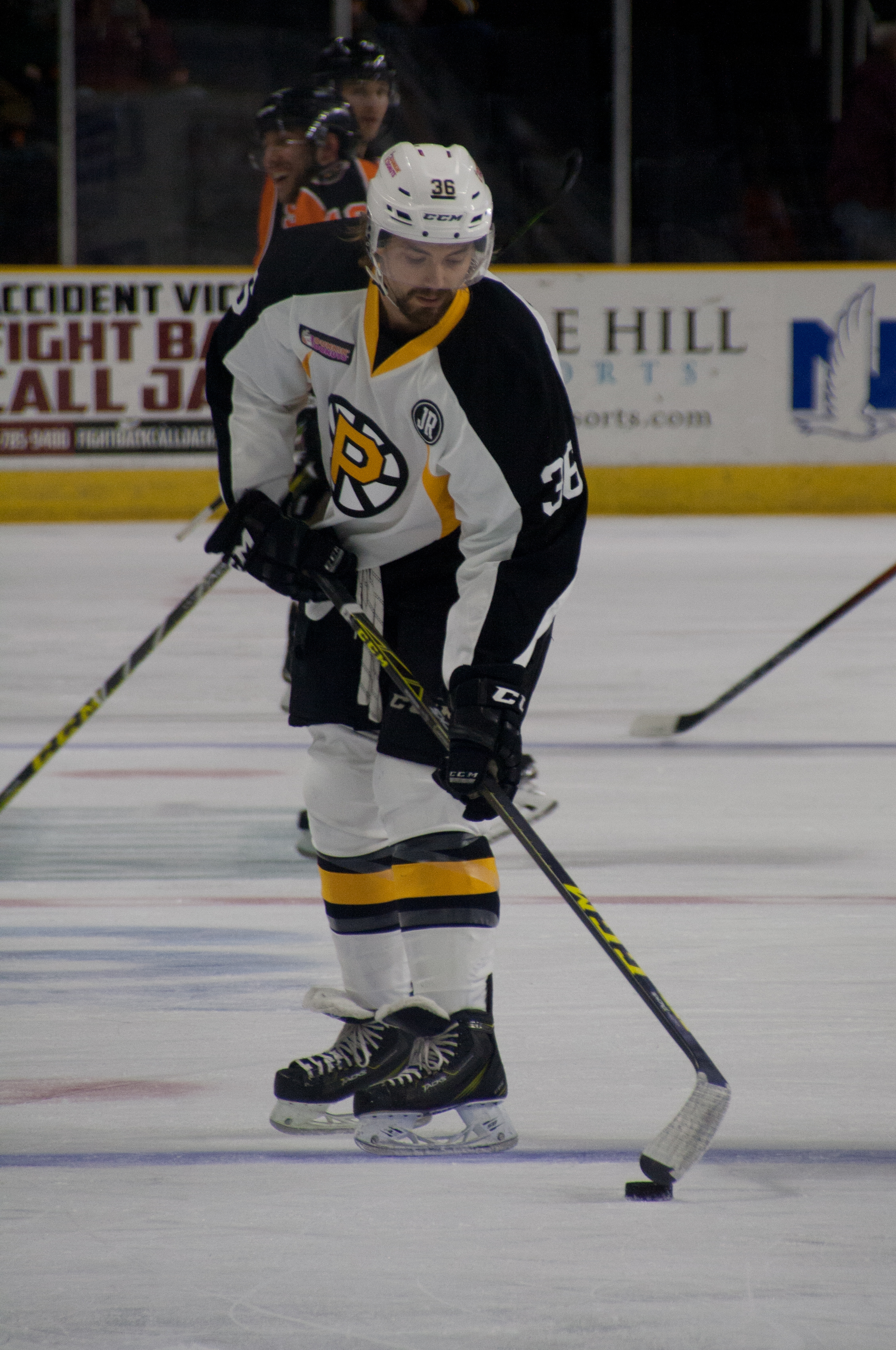
- Bordson with the Providence Bruins in 2015
- Born: June 9, 1988 (age 38) Duluth, Minnesota, U.S.
- Height: 6 ft 2 in (188 cm)
- Weight: 199 lb (90 kg; 14 st 3 lb)
- Position: Forward
- Shoots: Left
- Norway team Former teams: Stavanger Oilers; Syracuse Crunch; Adirondack Phantoms; Rochester Americans; Chicago Wolves; Providence Bruins; Iowa Wild; Fischtown Pinguins; Düsseldorfer EG; Västerviks IK; HPK
- NHL draft: Undrafted
- Playing career: 2010–present

Rob Bordson (born June 9, 1988) is an American professional ice hockey forward who is currently playing under contract with the Stavanger Oilers in the Norwegian Eliteserien.

== Playing career ==
Bordson signed a two-year entry-level contract with the Anaheim Ducks on March 23, 2010, after playing three seasons of collegiate hockey with the University of Minnesota Duluth. Shortly into his first professional season, Bordson was traded to the Philadelphia Flyers with Danny Syvret for David Laliberte and Patrick Maroon.

Bordson was part of the blockbuster trade that sent Mike Richards to the Los Angeles Kings for Wayne Simmonds, Brayden Schenn, and a 2012 2nd round pick on June 23, 2011 He was not tendered a qualifying offer by the Kings, making him an unrestricted free agent.

On September 15, 2011, Bordson was signed by the Trenton Titans of the ECHL. During the 2011–12 season, on December 9, 2011, Bordson was signed by the Rochester Americans of the AHL to a professional try out (PTO). He was returned to the Titans before he was signed by former team the Adirondack Phantoms on February 21, 2012, for the remainder of the season.

On August 12, 2014, Bordson signed a contract with the Chicago Wolves.

On September 14, 2015, Bordson signed as a free agent, returning to the ECHL for the first time since 2011, in agreeing to a deal with the Adirondack Thunder for their inaugural season. He was elected captain to start the 2015–16 season, and was named the player of the month for October in leading the ECHL in all offensive categories. With 13 points in 7 games Bordson returned to the AHL on November 6, 2015, signing a one-year contract with the Providence Bruins.

At the conclusion of the 2015–16 season, Bordson elected to embark on a European career, agreeing to a one-year contract as a free agent with new German DEL entrant the Fischtown Pinguins on July 14, 2016. Bordson endured a successful start to his European adventure, contributing with 30 assists and 38 points in 45 games during the 2016–17 season.

Opting to leave Fischtown at the conclusion of his contract, Bordson continued in the DEL, agreeing to a one-year deal with Düsseldorfer EG on August 31, 2017. In the 2017–18 season, Bordson was unable to replicate his scoring rate with DEG, recording just 3 goals in 31 games as the club missed the playoffs. His contract was not renewed at the conclusion of the season.

On July 26, 2018, Bordson signed a one-year contract in the neighbouring Austrian Hockey League (EBEL), with the Dornbirn Bulldogs. Prior to the 2018–19 campaign, Bordson suffered a season ending knee injury in the pre-season with the Bulldogs, cutting short his tenure with the club without making his debut.

After a full year of rehabilitation, Bordson resumed his professional career in agreeing to a one-year contract with Swedish club, Västerviks IK of the HockeyAllsvenskan on July 11, 2019. He split the season between Sweden and the Finnish Liiga joining HPK to end the 2019–20 season, registering 4 assists in 10 games before the remainder of the season was cancelled due to the COVID-19 pandemic.

Spending four seasons abroad in Europe, on October 6, 2020, Bordson returned to North America by agreeing to a contract with the Kansas City Mavericks of the ECHL. As captain of the Mavericks for the 2020–21 season, Bordson in a top scoring line role produced 17 goals and 50 points through 57 regular season games.

On July 7, 2021, Bordson returned to the Adirondack Thunder of the ECHL as a free agent. Before making his return, Bordson left the club after securing a European contract with Norwegian club, Stavanger Oilers, on October 5, 2021.

== Career statistics ==
			Regular season					Playoffs
Season	Team	League	GP	G	A	Pts	PIM	GP	G	A	Pts	PIM
2006–07	Cedar Rapids RoughRiders	USHL	47	6	29	35	26	5	0	1	1	0
2007–08	Minnesota–Duluth Bulldogs	WCHA	27	1	6	7	6	—	—	—	—	—
2008–09	Minnesota–Duluth Bulldogs	WCHA	15	0	0	0	6	—	—	—	—	—
2009–10	Minnesota–Duluth Bulldogs	WCHA	40	12	28	40	18	—	—	—	—	—
2010–11	Syracuse Crunch	AHL	15	1	2	3	4	—	—	—	—	—
2010–11	Adirondack Phantoms	AHL	60	7	14	21	28	—	—	—	—	—
2011–12	Trenton Titans	ECHL	38	17	34	51	38	—	—	—	—	—
2011–12	Rochester Americans	AHL	8	0	0	0	2	—	—	—	—	—
2011–12	Adirondack Phantoms	AHL	24	2	5	7	16	—	—	—	—	—
2012–13	Adirondack Phantoms	AHL	76	12	13	25	35	—	—	—	—	—
2013–14	Adirondack Phantoms	AHL	75	11	14	25	69	—	—	—	—	—
2014–15	Chicago Wolves	AHL	61	8	15	23	33	2	0	0	0	2
2015–16	Adirondack Thunder	ECHL	9	9	9	18	4	—	—	—	—	—
2015–16	Providence Bruins	AHL	10	1	4	5	4	—	—	—	—	—
2015–16	Iowa Wild	AHL	50	8	10	18	17	—	—	—	—	—
2016–17	Fischtown Pinguins	DEL	45	8	30	38	22	6	0	2	2	4
2017–18	Düsseldorfer EG	DEL	31	3	13	16	8	—	—	—	—	—
2019–20	Västerviks IK	Allsv	38	10	24	34	28	—	—	—	—	—
2019–20	HPK	Liiga	10	0	4	4	2	—	—	—	—	—
2020–21	Kansas City Mavericks	ECHL	57	17	33	50	10	—	—	—	—	—
AHL totals			380	50	77	127	208	2	0	0	0	2
