= Westin (surname) =

Westin is a Swedish surname.

== Geographical distribution ==
As of 2014, 53.2% of all known bearers of the surname Westin were residents of Sweden (frequency 1:2,799), 21.8% of the United States (1:250,869), 14.5% of Brazil (1:212,370), 2.1% of Norway (1:36,214), 1.9% of Canada (1:294,384), 1.6% of Australia (1:218,109) and 1.0% of Finland (1:80,835).

In Sweden, the frequency of the surname was higher than national average (1:2,799) in the following counties:

1. Västernorrland County (1:413)
2. Gävleborg County (1:1,334)
3. Västerbotten County (1:1,811)
4. Uppsala County (1:1,851)
5. Stockholm County (1:2,029)
6. Jämtland County (1:2,103)

== People ==
- David Westin (born 1952), American television news anchor and former president of ABC News
- Jens Westin (born 1989), Swedish ice hockey player
- John Westin (born 1992), Swedish ice hockey player, brother of Jens
- Leslie L. Westin (1917–1985), American educator and politician
- Maren Westin, American basketball player
- Sherrie Rollins Westin, American nonprofit leader and government official and wife of David
- Lars Westin, Swedish Jazz journalist and radio personality
