= 2010 NHL entry draft =

2010 North American ice hockey draft

General information
- Date: June 25–26, 2010
- Location: Staples Center; Los Angeles, California, U.S.

Overview
- 210 total selections in 7 rounds
- First selection: (Canada) Taylor Hall (Edmonton Oilers)

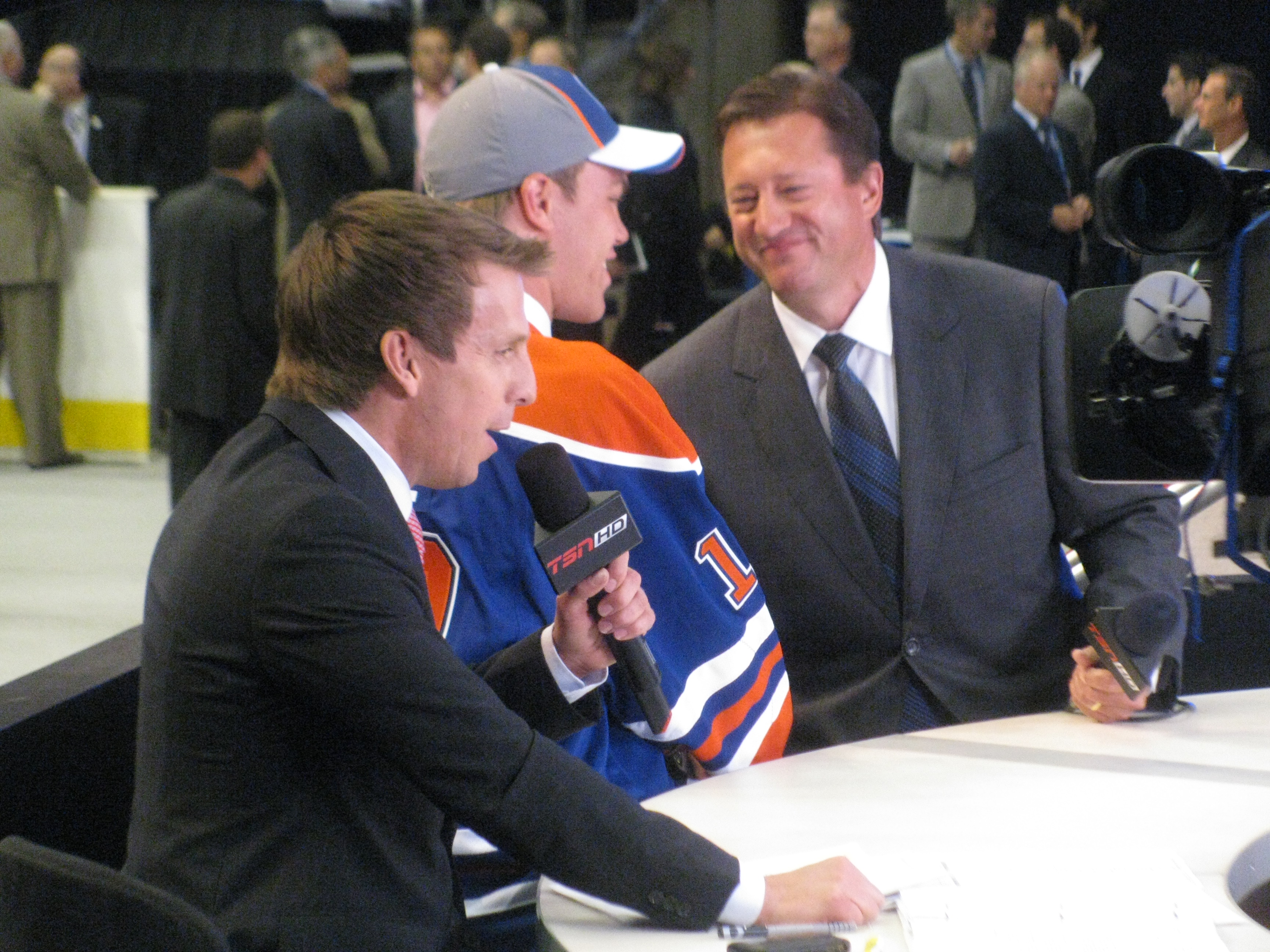
Taylor Hall, selected first-overall, sits down with TSN's panel at the Draft

The 2010 NHL entry draft was the 48th draft for the National Hockey League. It was held on June 25–26, 2010, at Staples Center in Los Angeles. This was the first time Los Angeles hosted the NHL draft. An unofficial record of 11 American-trained players were selected in the first round, starting with Jack Campbell and ending with Brock Nelson. The record was set in the 2006 and 2007 drafts, where 10 U.S.-trained players were selected in the first round.

As of 2026, there are 34 active NHL players from this draft.

== Top prospects ==
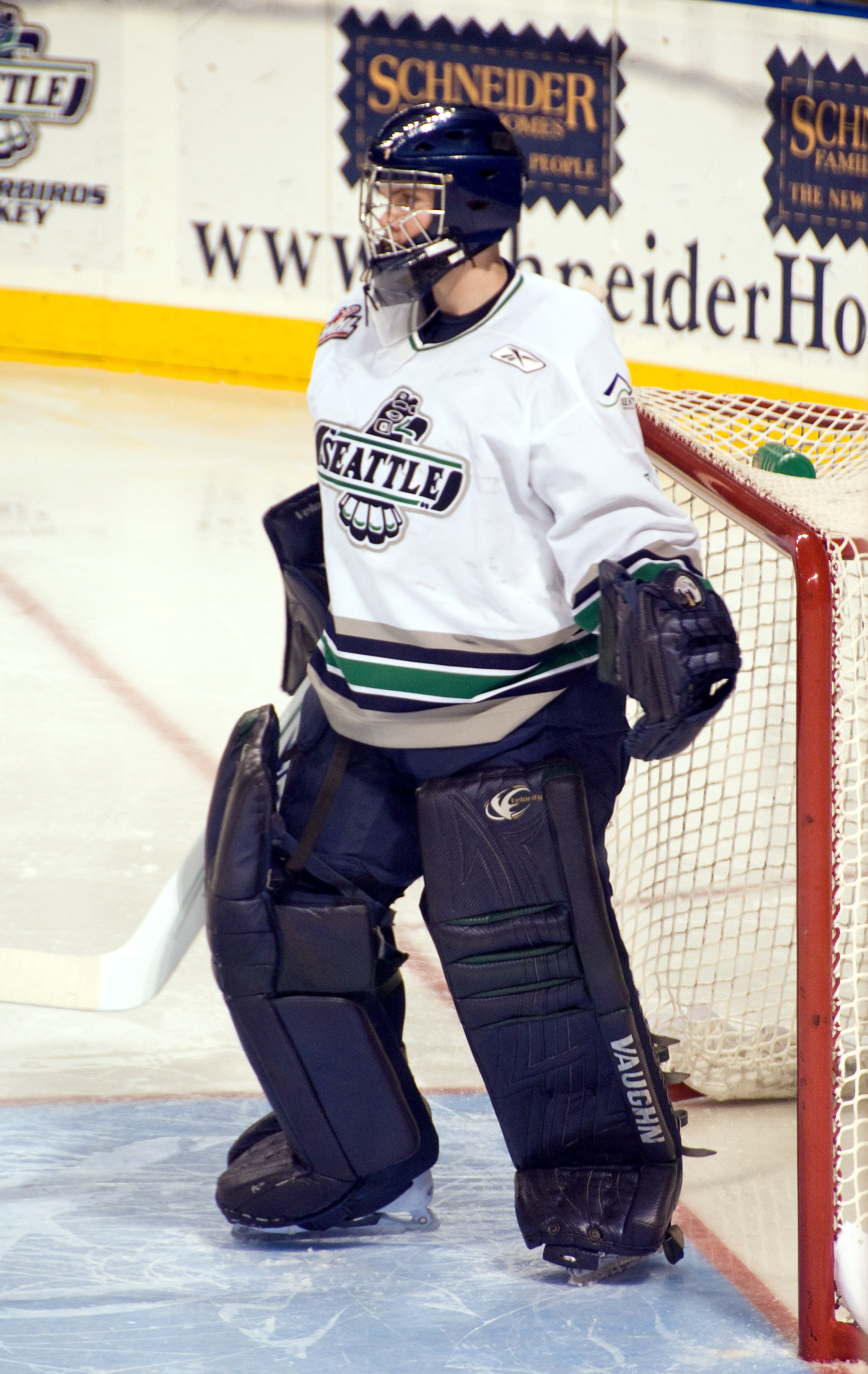
Calvin Pickard of the Seattle Thunderbirds (WHL) was the top-rated North American goalie.

Source: NHL Central Scouting Bureau final rankings.

Ranking	North American skaters	European skaters
1	(Canada) Tyler Seguin (C)	(Finland) Mikael Granlund (C)
2	(Canada) Taylor Hall (LW)	(Russia) Vladimir Tarasenko (RW)
3	(Canada) Brett Connolly (RW)	(Russia) Evgeny Kuznetsov (C)
4	(Canada) Erik Gudbranson (D)	(Sweden) Calle Jarnkrok (C)
5	(United States) Cam Fowler (D)	(Sweden) Ludvig Rensfeldt (LW)
6	(Canada) Brandon Gormley (D)	(Russia) Maxim Kitsyn (LW)
7	(Canada) Mark Pysyk (D)	(Sweden) Oscar Lindberg (C)
8	(United States) Emerson Etem (RW)	(Germany) Tom Kuhnhackl (RW)
9	(United States) Derek Forbort (D)	(Sweden) Adam Pettersson (C)
10	(Canada) Ryan Johansen (C)	(Slovakia) Martin Marincin (D)

Ranking	North American goalies	European goalies
1	(Canada) Calvin Pickard	(Finland) Sami Aittokallio
2	(United States) Jack Campbell	(Sweden) Fredrik Pettersson-Wentzel
3	(Canada) Kent Simpson	(Switzerland) Benjamin Conz

== Draft Lottery ==
The 2010 NHL entry draft lottery was held on April 13, 2010. The lottery saw no change from the overall NHL standings to end the 2009–10 NHL season. For the fourth time in five years, the 30th placed team, this year being the Edmonton Oilers, has kept the first overall draft pick.

== Selections by round ==
=== Round one ===
= NHL All-Star team ·	= NHL All-Star (Note: Players are identified as an All-Star if they were selected for the All-Star game at any time in their career.) ·	= NHL All-Star and NHL All-Star team ·

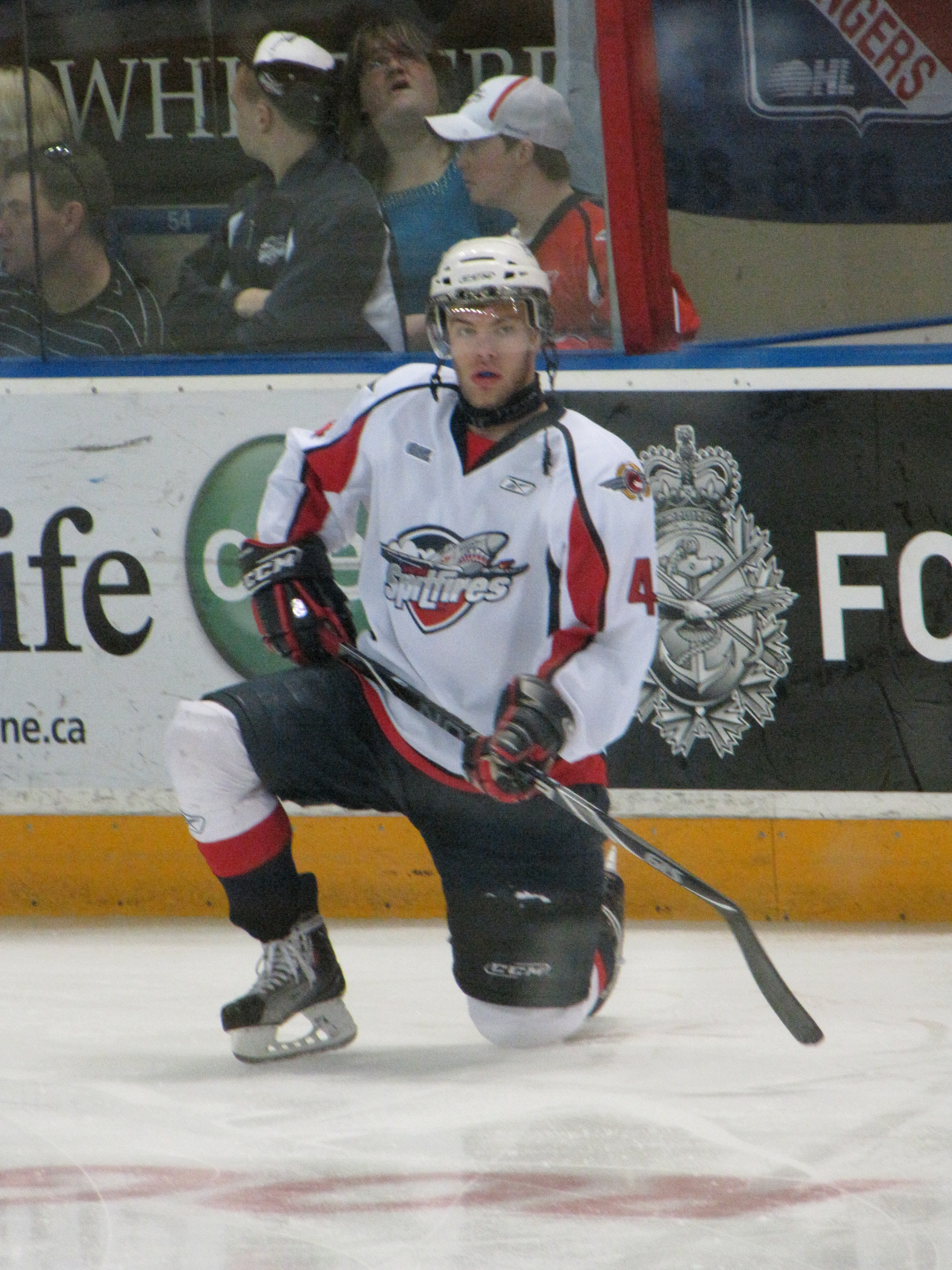
Taylor Hall was selected first overall by the Edmonton Oilers.

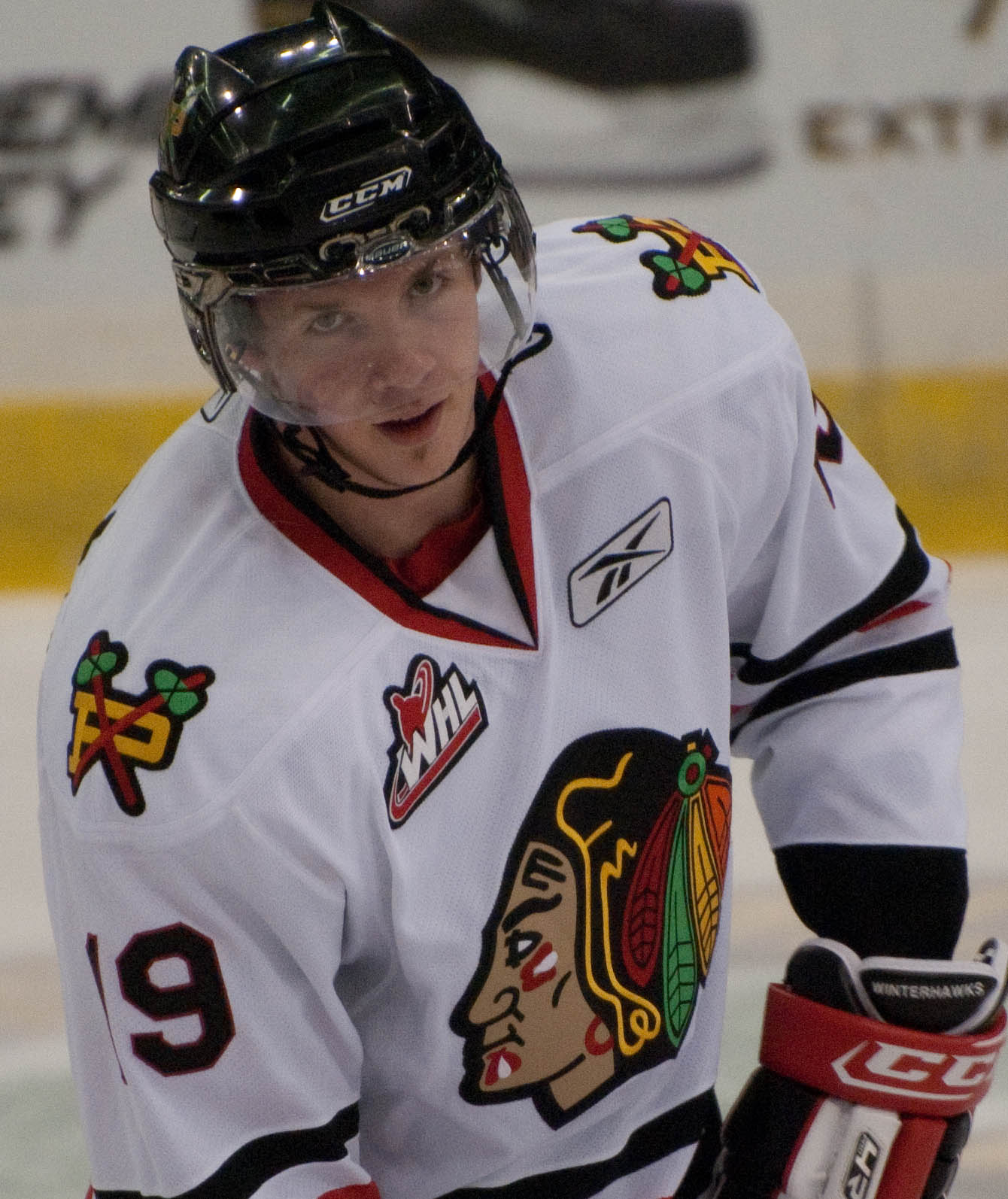
Ryan Johansen was selected fourth overall by the Columbus Blue Jackets.

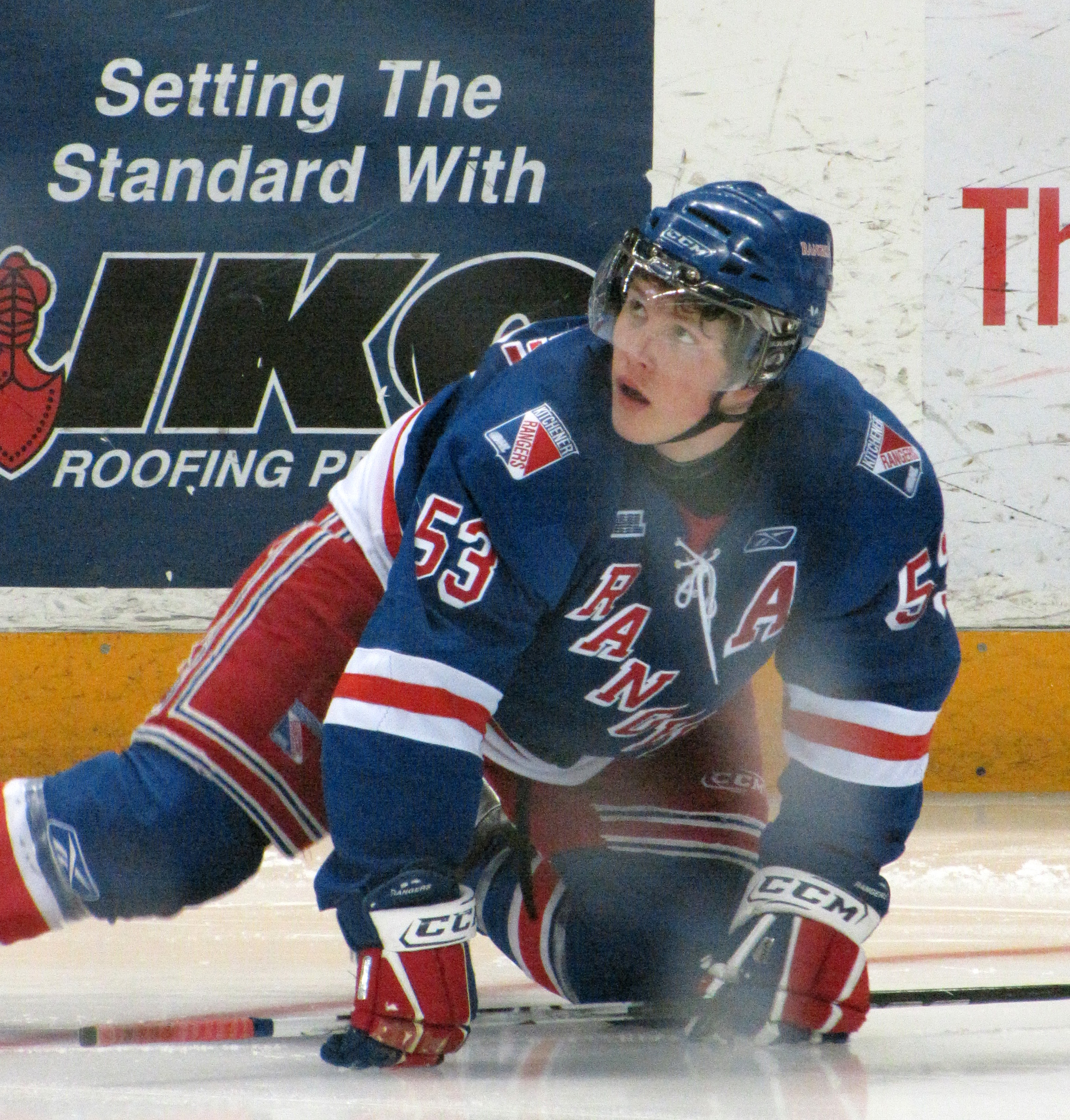
Jeff Skinner was selected 7th overall by the Carolina Hurricanes.

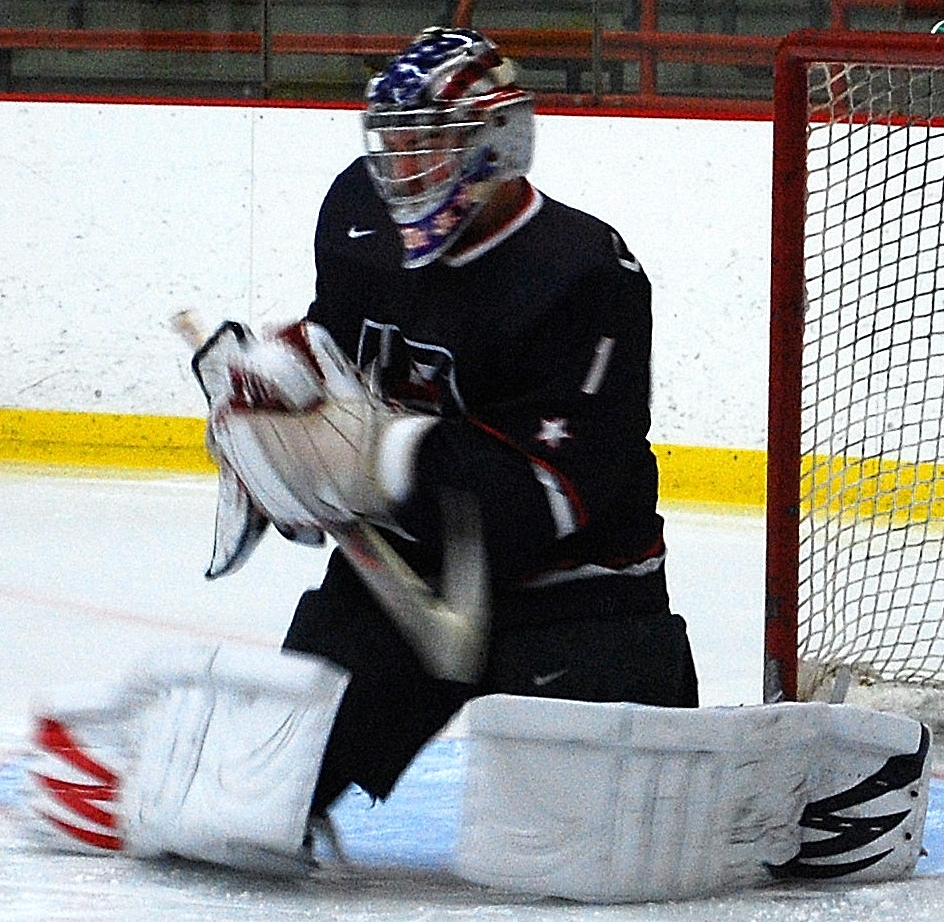
Jack Campbell was selected 11th overall by the Dallas Stars.

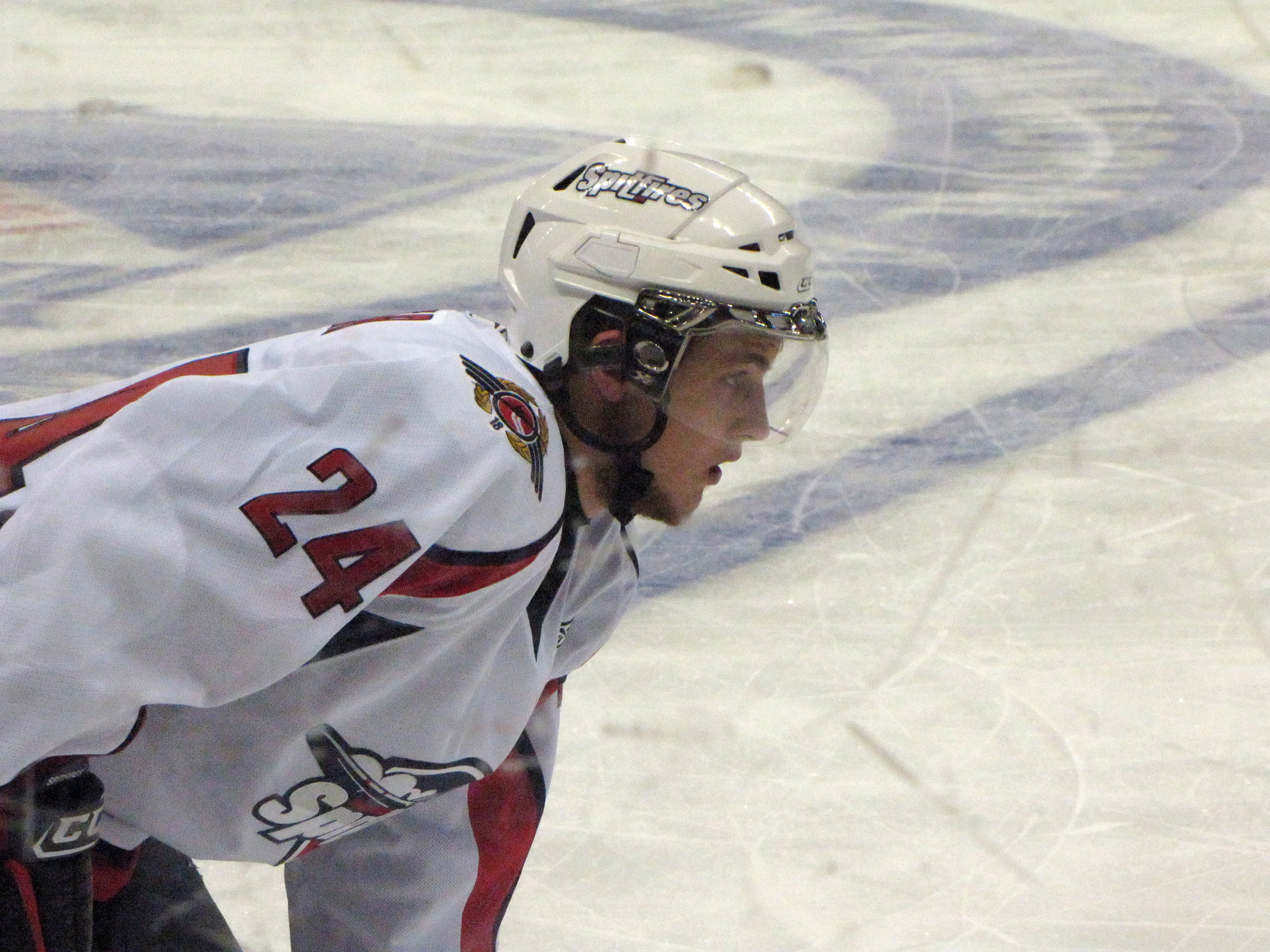
Cam Fowler was selected 12th overall by the Anaheim Ducks.

#	Player	Nationality	NHL team	College/junior/club team
1	Taylor Hall (LW)	Canada	Edmonton Oilers	Windsor Spitfires (OHL)
2	Tyler Seguin (C)	Canada	Boston Bruins (from Toronto)^{1}	Plymouth Whalers (OHL)
3	Erik Gudbranson (D)	Canada	Florida Panthers	Kingston Frontenacs (OHL)
4	Ryan Johansen (C)	Canada	Columbus Blue Jackets	Portland Winterhawks (WHL)
5	Nino Niederreiter (LW)	Switzerland	New York Islanders	Portland Winterhawks (WHL)
6	Brett Connolly (RW)	Canada	Tampa Bay Lightning	Prince George Cougars (WHL)
7	Jeff Skinner (C)	Canada	Carolina Hurricanes	Kitchener Rangers (OHL)
8	Alexander Burmistrov (C)	Russia	Atlanta Thrashers	Barrie Colts (OHL)
9	Mikael Granlund (C)	Finland	Minnesota Wild	HIFK (SM-liiga)
10	Dylan McIlrath (D)	Canada	New York Rangers	Moose Jaw Warriors (WHL)
11	Jack Campbell (G)	United States	Dallas Stars	US NTDP (USHL)
12	Cam Fowler (D)	United States	Anaheim Ducks	Windsor Spitfires (OHL)
13	Brandon Gormley (D)	Canada	Phoenix Coyotes (from Calgary)^{2}	Moncton Wildcats (QMJHL)
14	Jaden Schwartz (C)	Canada	St. Louis Blues	Tri-City Storm (USHL)
15	Derek Forbort (D)	United States	Los Angeles Kings (from Boston via Florida)^{3}	US NTDP (USHL)
16	Vladimir Tarasenko (RW)	Russia	St. Louis Blues (from Ottawa)^{4}	Sibir Novosibirsk (KHL)
17	Joey Hishon (C)	Canada	Colorado Avalanche	Owen Sound Attack (OHL)
18	Austin Watson (RW)	United States	Nashville Predators	Peterborough Petes (OHL)
19	Nick Bjugstad (C)	United States	Florida Panthers (from Los Angeles)^{5}	Blaine High School (USHS–MN)
20	Beau Bennett (RW)	United States	Pittsburgh Penguins	Penticton Vees (BCHL)
21	Riley Sheahan (C)	Canada	Detroit Red Wings	University of Notre Dame (CCHA)
22	Jarred Tinordi (D)	United States	Montreal Canadiens (from Phoenix)^{6}	London Knights (OHL)
23	Mark Pysyk (D)	Canada	Buffalo Sabres	Edmonton Oil Kings (WHL)
24	Kevin Hayes (RW)	United States	Chicago Blackhawks (from New Jersey via Atlanta)^{7}	Noble and Greenough School (USHS–MA)
25	Quinton Howden (LW)	Canada	Florida Panthers (from Vancouver)^{8}	Moose Jaw Warriors (WHL)
26	Evgeny Kuznetsov (C)	Russia	Washington Capitals	Traktor Chelyabinsk (KHL)
27	Mark Visentin (G)	Canada	Phoenix Coyotes (from Montreal)^{9}	Niagara IceDogs (OHL)
28	Charlie Coyle (C/RW)	United States	San Jose Sharks	South Shore Kings (EJHL)
29	Emerson Etem (RW)	United States	Anaheim Ducks (from Philadelphia)^{10}	Medicine Hat Tigers (WHL)
30	Brock Nelson (C)	United States	New York Islanders (from Chicago)^{11}	Warroad High School (USHS–MN)

Notes

1. The Toronto Maple Leafs' first-round pick went to the Boston Bruins as the result of a trade on September 18, 2009, that sent Phil Kessel to Toronto in exchange for Toronto's first-round pick in 2011, Toronto's second-round pick in 2010 and this pick.
2. The Calgary Flames' first-round pick went to the Phoenix Coyotes as the result of a trade on March 4, 2009, that sent Olli Jokinen and Phoenix's third-round pick in 2009 to Calgary for Matthew Lombardi, Brandon Prust and this pick (being conditional at the time of the trade). The condition – Calgary had the option to give their first-round pick to Phoenix either in 2009 or 2010 – was converted on June 1, 2009, when Calgary decided to keep their first-round pick in 2009.
3. The Boston Bruins' first-round pick went to the Los Angeles Kings as the result of a trade on June 25, 2010, that sent Los Angeles' first-round pick (19th overall) and Philadelphia's second-round pick (59th overall) both in 2010 to Florida in exchange for this pick.
  Florida previously acquired the pick as the result of a trade on June 22, 2010, that sent Nathan Horton and Gregory Campbell to Boston in exchange for Dennis Wideman, Boston's third-round pick in 2011 and this pick.
4. The Ottawa Senators' first-round pick went to the St. Louis Blues as the result of a trade on June 25, 2010, that sent David Rundblad to Ottawa in exchange for this pick.
5. The Los Angeles Kings' first-round pick went to the Florida Panthers as the result of a trade on June 25, 2010, that sent Boston's first-round pick in 2010 (15th overall) to Los Angeles in exchange for Philadelphia's second-round pick in 2010 (59th overall) and this pick.
6. The Phoenix Coyotes' first-round pick went to the Montreal Canadiens as the result of a trade on June 25, 2010, that sent Montreal's first and second-round picks both in 2010 (27th and 57th overall) to Phoenix in exchange for Buffalo's fourth-round pick in 2010 (113th overall) and this pick.
7. The New Jersey Devils' first-round pick went to the Chicago Blackhawks as the result of a trade on June 24, 2010, that sent Dustin Byfuglien, Ben Eager, Brent Sopel and Akim Aliu to Atlanta in exchange for Marty Reasoner, Joey Crabb, Jeremy Morin, New Jersey's second-round pick in 2010 and this pick.
  Atlanta previously acquired the pick as the result of a trade on February 4, 2010, that sent Ilya Kovalchuk, Anssi Salmela and Atlanta's second-round pick in 2010 to New Jersey in exchange for Niclas Bergfors, Johnny Oduya, Patrice Cormier, New Jersey's second-round pick in 2010 and this pick.
8. The Vancouver Canucks' first-round pick went to the Florida Panthers as the result of a trade on June 25, 2010, that sent Keith Ballard and Victor Oreskovich to Vancouver in exchange for Steve Bernier, Michael Grabner and this pick.
9. The Montreal Canadiens' first-round pick went to the Phoenix Coyotes as the result of a trade on June 25, 2010, that sent Phoenix's first-round pick and Buffalo's fourth-round pick both in 2010 (22nd and 113th overall) to Montreal in exchange for Montreal's second-round pick in 2010 (57th overall) and this pick.
10. The Philadelphia Flyers' first-round pick went to the Anaheim Ducks as the result of a trade on June 26, 2009, that sent Chris Pronger and Ryan Dingle to Philadelphia in exchange for Joffrey Lupul, Luca Sbisa, Philadelphia's first-round pick in 2009, a conditional third-round pick in either 2010 or 2011 and this pick.
11. The Chicago Blackhawks' first-round pick went to the New York Islanders as the result of a trade on June 25, 2010, that sent the Islanders and San Jose's second round picks in 2010 (35th and 58th overall) to Chicago in exchange for this pick.

=== Round two ===
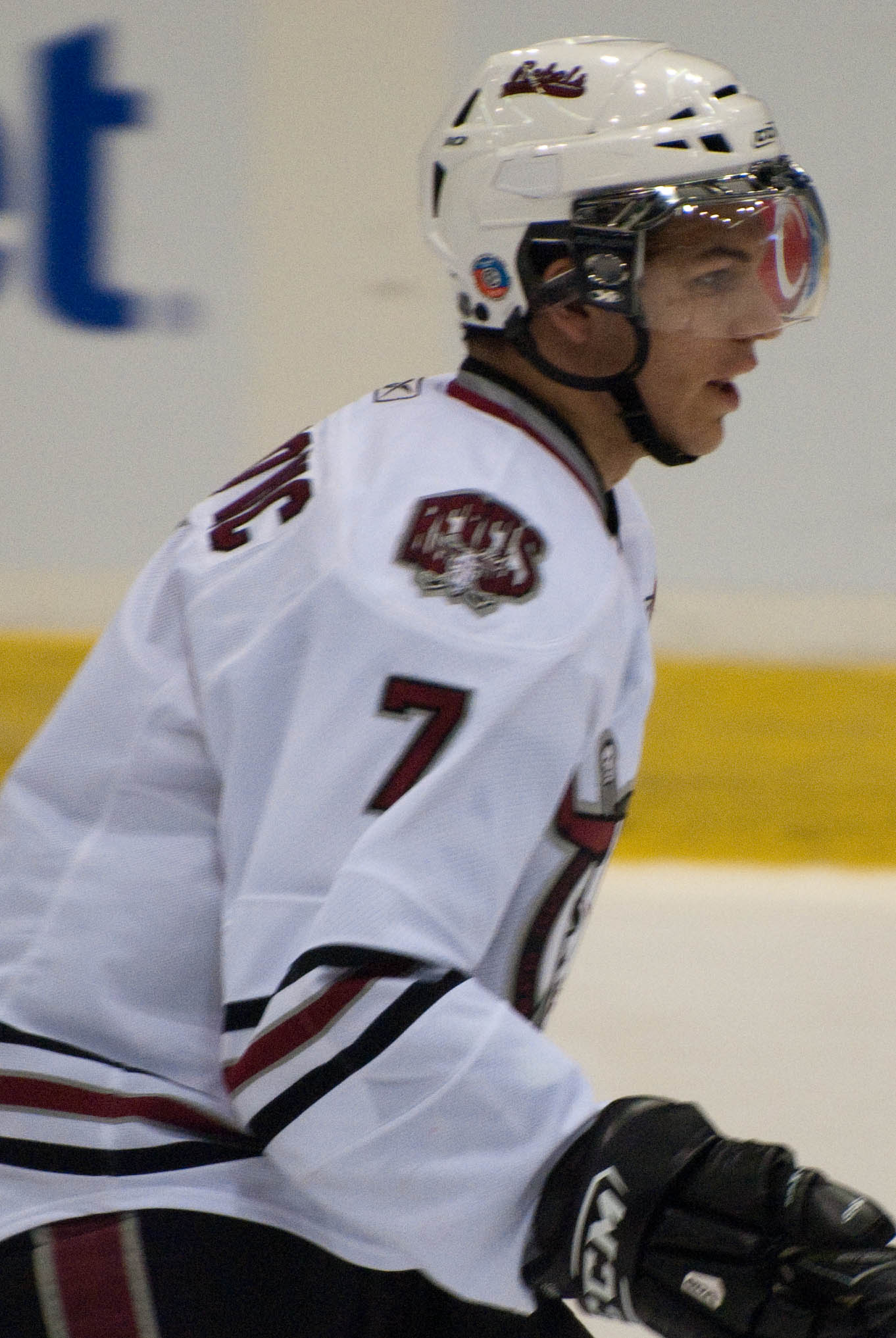
Alex Petrovic, picked 36th overall by the Florida Panthers

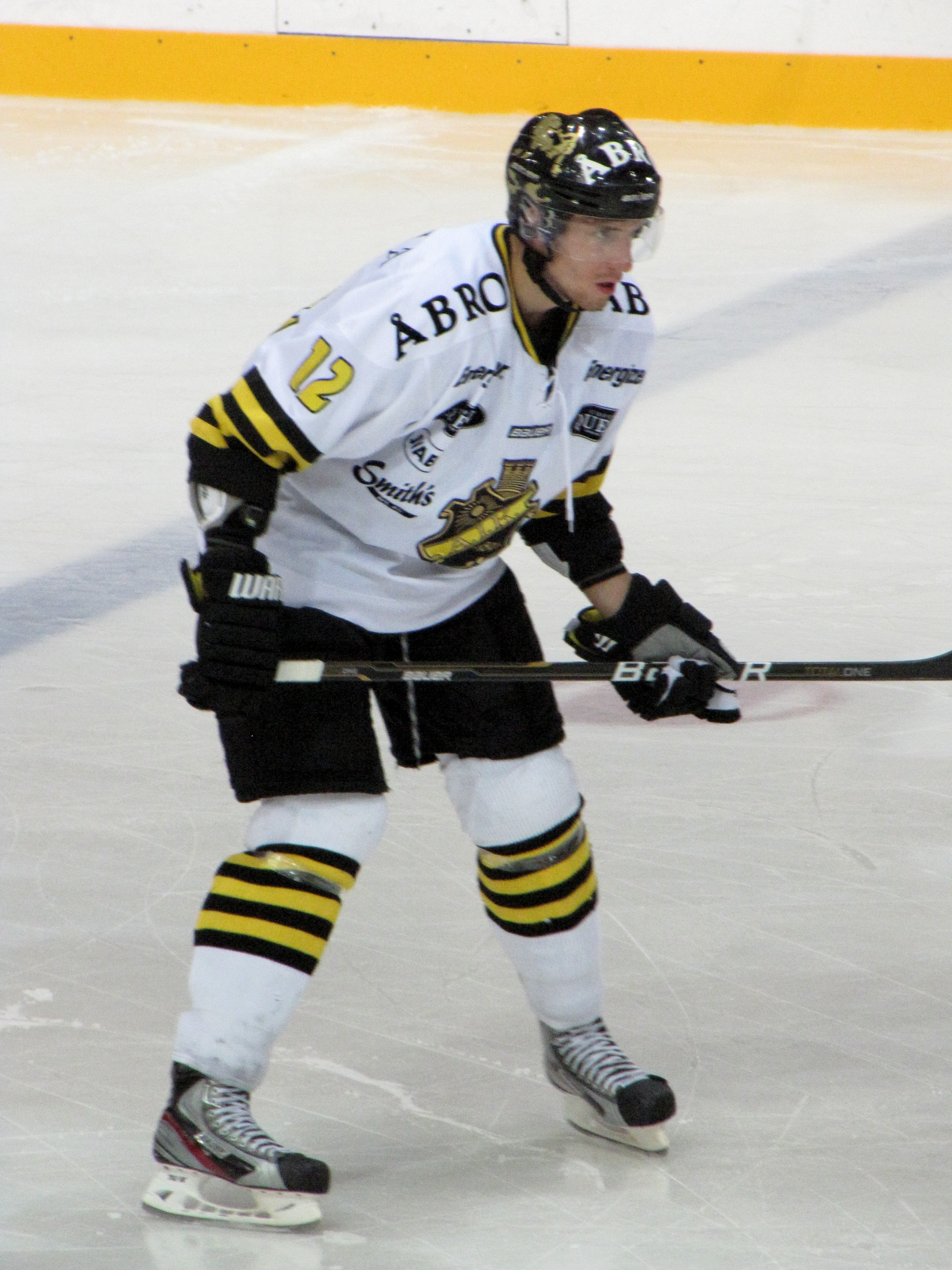
Patrik Nemeth, picked 41st overall by the Dallas Stars

#	Player	Nationality	NHL team	College/junior/club team
31	Tyler Pitlick (C)	United States	Edmonton Oilers	Minnesota State University, Mankato (WCHA)
32	Jared Knight (C)	United States	Boston Bruins (from Toronto via Montreal, Chicago and Toronto)^{1}	London Knights (OHL)
33	John McFarland (C)	Canada	Florida Panthers	Sudbury Wolves (OHL)
34	Dalton Smith (LW)	Canada	Columbus Blue Jackets	Ottawa 67's (OHL)
35	Ludvig Rensfeldt (C)	Sweden	Chicago Blackhawks (from NY Islanders)^{2}	Brynas IF (J20 SuperElit)
36	Alex Petrovic (D)	Canada	Florida Panthers (from Tampa Bay via Boston)^{3}	Red Deer Rebels (WHL)
37	Justin Faulk (D)	United States	Carolina Hurricanes	US NTDP (USHL)
38	Jon Merrill (D)	United States	New Jersey Devils (from Atlanta)^{4}	US NTDP (USHL)
39	Brett Bulmer (RW)	Canada	Minnesota Wild	Kelowna Rockets (WHL)
40	Christian Thomas (RW)	Canada	New York Rangers	Oshawa Generals (OHL)
41	Patrik Nemeth (D)	Sweden	Dallas Stars	AIK IF (J20 SuperElit)
42	Devante Smith-Pelly (RW)	Canada	Anaheim Ducks	Mississauga St. Michael's Majors (OHL)
43	Brad Ross (LW)	Canada	Toronto Maple Leafs (from Calgary via Chicago)^{5}	Portland Winterhawks (WHL)
44	Sebastian Wannstrom (C)	Sweden	St. Louis Blues	Brynas IF (J20 SuperElit)
45	Ryan Spooner (C)	Canada	Boston Bruins	Peterborough Petes (OHL)
46	Martin Marincin (D)	Slovakia	Edmonton Oilers (from Ottawa via Carolina)^{6}	HC Kosice (Slovak Extraliga)
47	Tyler Toffoli (RW)	Canada	Los Angeles Kings (from Colorado)^{7}	Ottawa 67's (OHL)
48	Curtis Hamilton (LW)	Canada	Edmonton Oilers (from Nashville)^{8}	Saskatoon Blades (WHL)
49	Calvin Pickard (G)	Canada	Colorado Avalanche (from Los Angeles)^{9}	Seattle Thunderbirds (WHL)
50	Connor Brickley (C)	United States	Florida Panthers (from Pittsburgh)^{10}	Des Moines Buccaneers (USHL)
51	Calle Jarnkrok (C)	Sweden	Detroit Red Wings	Brynas IF (Elitserien)
52	Phil Lane (RW)	United States	Phoenix Coyotes	Brampton Battalion (OHL)
53	Mark Alt (D)	United States	Carolina Hurricanes (from Buffalo via San Jose)^{11}	Cretin-Derham Hall (United States High School–MN)
54	Justin Holl (D)	United States	Chicago Blackhawks (from New Jersey via Atlanta)^{12}	Omaha Lancers (USHL)
55	Petr Straka (F)	Czech Republic	Columbus Blue Jackets (from Vancouver via Buffalo)^{13}	Rimouski Oceanic (QMJHL)
56	Johan Larsson (C)	Sweden	Minnesota Wild (from Washington)^{14}	Brynas IF (J20 SuperElit)
57	Oscar Lindberg (C)	Sweden	Phoenix Coyotes (from Montreal)^{15}	Skelleftea AIK (Elitserien)
58	Kent Simpson (G)	Canada	Chicago Blackhawks (from San Jose via Ottawa and NY Islanders)^{16}	Everett Silvertips (WHL)
59	Jason Zucker (RW)	United States	Minnesota Wild (from Philadelphia via Los Angeles and Florida)^{17}	US NTDP (USHL)
60	Stephen Johns (D)	United States	Chicago Blackhawks	US NTDP (USHL)

Notes

1. The Toronto Maple Leafs' second-round pick went to the Boston Bruins as the result of a trade on September 18, 2009, that sent Phil Kessel to Toronto in exchange for Toronto's first-round picks in 2010 and 2011 and this pick.
  Toronto previously re-acquired their own second-round pick as the result of a trade on September 5, 2009, that sent Calgary's second-round pick in 2011 and Toronto's own third-round pick in 2011 to Chicago in exchange for this pick.
  Chicago previously acquired the pick as the result of a trade on September 12, 2008, that sent Robert Lang to Montreal in exchange for this pick.
  Montreal previously acquired the pick as the result of a trade on July 3, 2008, that sent Mikhail Grabovski to Toronto in exchange for Greg Pateryn and this pick.
2. The New York Islanders' second-round pick went to the Chicago Blackhawks as the result of a trade on June 25, 2010, that sent Chicago's first-round pick in 2010 (30th overall) to New York in exchange for San Jose's second-round pick in 2010 (58th overall) and this pick.
3. The Tampa Bay Lightning's second-round pick went to the Florida Panthers as the result of a trade on March 3, 2010, that sent Dennis Seidenberg and Matt Bartkowski to Boston in exchange for Craig Weller, Byron Bitz and this pick.
  Boston previously acquired the pick as the result of a trade on March 4, 2009, that sent Matt Lashoff and Martins Karsums to Tampa Bay in exchange for Mark Recchi and this pick.
4. The Atlanta Thrashers' second-round pick went to the New Jersey Devils as the result of a trade on February 4, 2010, that sent Niclas Bergfors, Johnny Oduya, Patrice Cormier, New Jersey's first and second-round picks in 2010 to Atlanta in exchange for Ilya Kovalchuk, Anssi Salmela and this pick.
5. The Calgary Flames' second-round pick went to the Toronto Maple Leafs as the result of a trade on June 26, 2010, that sent Jimmy Hayes to Chicago in exchange for this pick.
  Chicago previously acquired the pick as the result of a trade on July 1, 2008, that sent Rene Bourque to Calgary in exchange for this pick (being conditional at the time of the trade). The condition – Calgary chooses to trade a pick in either 2009 or 2010 – was converted on March 4, 2009, when Calgary traded their second-round pick in 2009 to Colorado.
6. The Ottawa Senators' second-round pick went to the Edmonton Oilers as the result of a trade on June 26, 2010, that sent the rights to Riley Nash to the Carolina Hurricanes in exchange for this pick.
  Carolina previously acquired the pick as the result of a trade on February 12, 2010, that sent Matt Cullen to Ottawa in exchange for Alexandre Picard and this pick.
7. The Colorado Avalanche's second-round pick went to the Los Angeles Kings as the result of a trade on June 26, 2010, that sent Los Angeles' second and fourth-round picks in 2010 (49th and 109th overall) to Colorado in exchange for this pick.
8. The Nashville Predators' second-round pick went to the Edmonton Oilers as the result of a trade on March 1, 2010, that sent Denis Grebeshkov to Nashville in exchange for this pick.
9. The Los Angeles Kings' second-round pick went to the Colorado Avalanche as the result of a trade on June 26, 2010, that sent Colorado's second-round pick in 2010 (47th overall) to Los Angeles in exchange for the Kings' fourth-round pick in 2010 (109th overall) and this pick.
10. The Pittsburgh Penguins' second-round pick went to the Florida Panthers as the result of a trade on March 1, 2010, that sent Jordan Leopold to Pittsburgh in exchange for this pick.
11. The Buffalo Sabres' second-round pick went to the Carolina Hurricanes as the result of a trade on February 7, 2010, that sent Niclas Wallin and Carolina's fifth-round pick in 2010 to San Jose in exchange for this pick.
  San Jose previously acquired the pick as the result of a trade on July 4, 2008, that sent Craig Rivet and San Jose's seventh-round pick in 2010 to Buffalo in exchange for Buffalo's second-round pick in 2009 and this pick.
12. The New Jersey Devils' second-round pick went to the Chicago Blackhawks as the result of a trade on June 24, 2010, that sent Dustin Byfuglien, Ben Eager, Brent Sopel and Akim Aliu to Atlanta in exchange for Marty Reasoner, Joey Crabb, Jeremy Morin, New Jersey's first-round pick in 2010 and this pick.
  Atlanta previously acquired this pick as the result of a trade on February 4, 2010, that sent Ilya Kovalchuk, Anssi Salmela and Atlanta's second-round pick in 2010 to New Jersey in exchange for Niclas Bergfors, Johnny Oduya, Patrice Cormier, New Jersey's first-round pick in 2010 and this pick.
13. The Vancouver Canucks' second-round pick went to the Columbus Blue Jackets as the result of a trade on March 3, 2010, that sent Raffi Torres to Buffalo in exchange for Nathan Paetsch and this pick.
  Buffalo previously acquired the pick as the result of a trade on July 4, 2008, that sent Steve Bernier to Vancouver in exchange for Los Angeles' third-round pick in 2009 and this pick.
14. The Washington Capitals' second-round pick went to the Minnesota Wild as the result of a trade on March 3, 2010, that sent Eric Belanger to Washington in exchange for this pick.
15. The Montreal Canadiens' second-round pick went to the Phoenix Coyotes as the result of a trade on June 25, 2010, that sent Phoenix's first-round pick and Buffalo's fourth-round pick both in 2010 (22nd and 113th overall) to Montreal in exchange for Montreal's first-round pick in 2010 (27th overall) and this pick.
16. The San Jose Sharks' second-round pick went to the Chicago Blackhawks as the result of a trade on June 25, 2010, that sent Chicago's first-round pick in 2010 (30th overall) to the New York Islanders in exchange for the Islanders' second-round pick in 2010 (35th overall) and this pick.
  The Islanders previously acquired the pick as the result of a trade on March 2, 2010, that sent Andy Sutton to Ottawa in exchange for this pick.
  Ottawa previously acquired the pick in a trade on September 12, 2009, that sent Dany Heatley and Ottawa's fifth-round pick in 2010 to San Jose in exchange for Milan Michalek, Jonathan Cheechoo and this pick.
17. The Philadelphia Flyers' second-round pick went to the Minnesota Wild as the result of a trade on June 26, 2010, that send Minnesota's third and fourth-round picks both in 2010 (69th and 99th overall) to Florida in exchange for this pick.
  Florida previously acquired the pick as the result of a trade on June 25, 2010, that sent Boston's first-round pick in 2010 (15th overall) to Los Angeles in exchange for the Kings' first-round pick in 2010 (19th overall) and this pick.
  Los Angeles previously acquired the pick as the result of a trade on July 1, 2008, that sent Patrik Hersley and Ned Lukacevic to Philadelphia in exchange for Denis Gauthier and this pick.

=== Round three ===
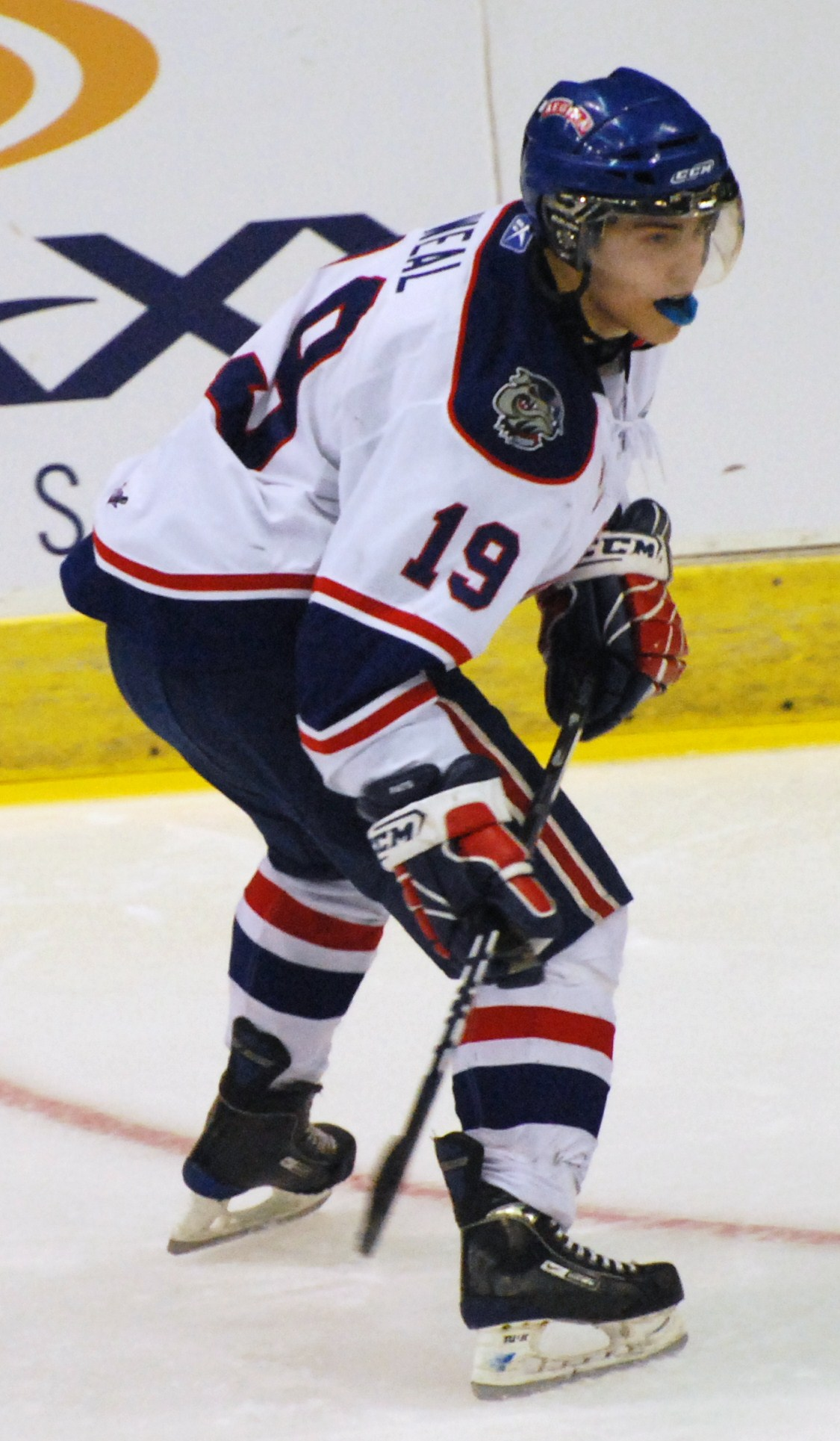
Jordan Weal, picked 70th overall by the Los Angeles Kings

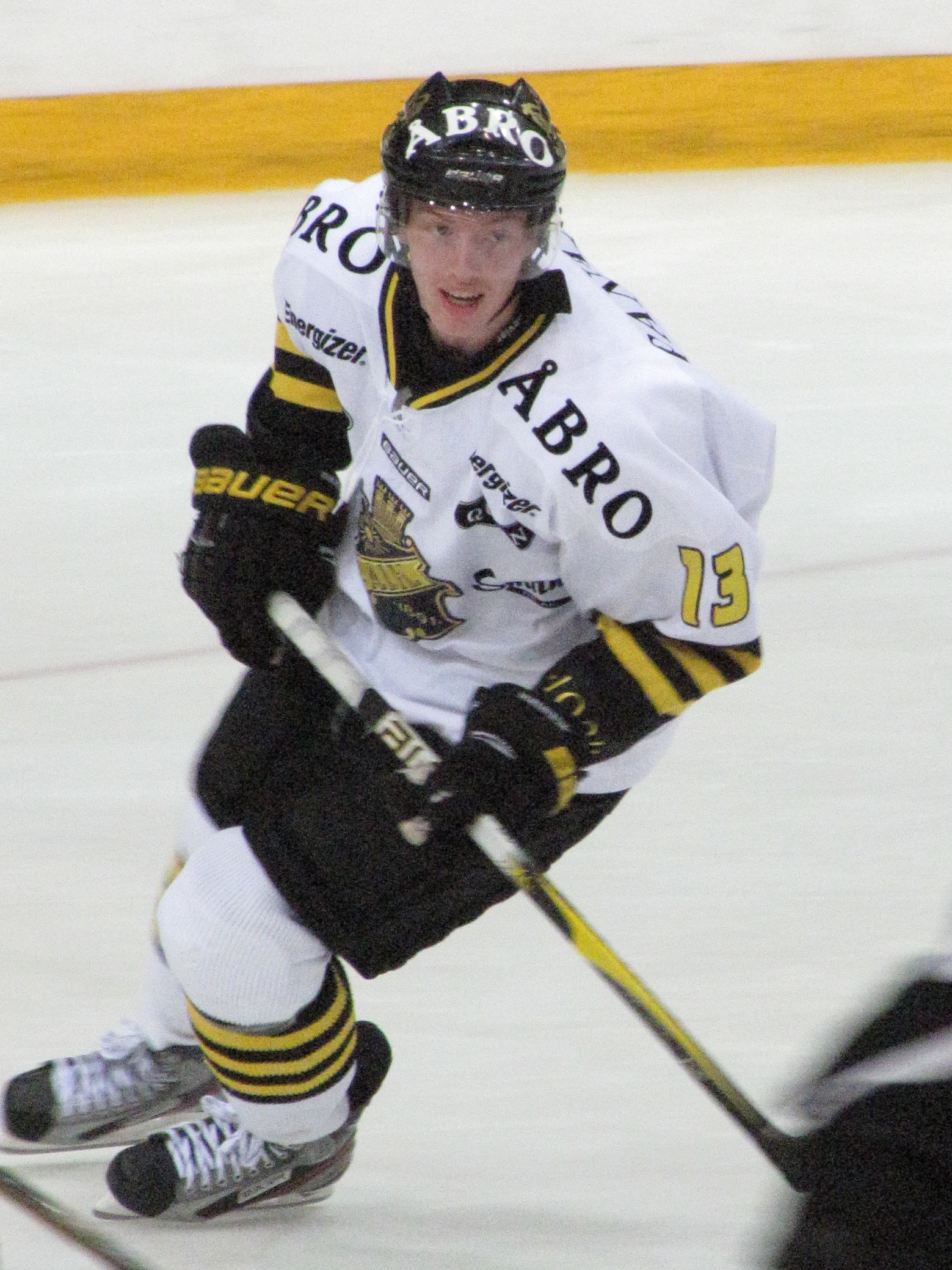
Joakim Nordström, picked 90th overall by the Chicago Blackhawks

#	Player	Nationality	NHL team	College/junior/club team
61	Ryan Martindale (C)	Canada	Edmonton Oilers	Ottawa 67's (OHL)
62	Greg McKegg (C)	Canada	Toronto Maple Leafs	Erie Otters (OHL)
63	Brock Beukeboom (D)	United States	Tampa Bay Lightning (from Florida via Los Angeles)^{1}	Sault Ste. Marie Greyhounds (OHL)
64	Max Reinhart (C)	Canada	Calgary Flames (from Columbus)^{2}	Kootenay Ice (WHL)
65	Kirill Kabanov (LW)	Russia	New York Islanders	Moncton Wildcats (QMJHL)
66	Radko Gudas (D)	Czech Republic	Tampa Bay Lightning	Everett Silvertips (WHL)
67	Danny Biega (D)	Canada	Carolina Hurricanes	Harvard University (ECAC)
68	Jerome Gauthier-Leduc (D)	Canada	Buffalo Sabres (from Atlanta)^{3}	Rouyn-Noranda Huskies (QMJHL)
69	Joe Basaraba (RW)	Canada	Florida Panthers (from Minnesota)^{4}	Shattuck-Saint Mary's (Midget Major AAA)
70	Jordan Weal (C)	Canada	Los Angeles Kings (from NY Rangers)^{5}	Regina Pats (WHL)
71	Michael Bournival (LW)	Canada	Colorado Avalanche (from Dallas)^{6}	Shawinigan Cataractes (QMJHL)
72	Adam Janosik (D)	Slovakia	Tampa Bay Lightning (from Anaheim)^{7}	Gatineau Olympiques (QMJHL)
73	Joey Leach (D)	Canada	Calgary Flames	Kootenay Ice (WHL)
74	Max Gardiner (C)	United States	St. Louis Blues	Minnetonka High School (USHS–MN)
75	Kevin Sundher (C)	Canada	Buffalo Sabres (from Boston)^{8}	Chilliwack Bruins (WHL)
76	Jakub Culek (LW)	Czech Republic	Ottawa Senators	Rimouski Oceanic (QMJHL)
77	Alexander Guptill (LW)	Canada	Dallas Stars (from Colorado)^{9}	Orangeville Crushers (CCHL)
78	Taylor Aronson (D)	United States	Nashville Predators	Portland Winterhawks (WHL)
79	Sondre Olden (LW/RW)	Norway	Toronto Maple Leafs (from Los Angeles) ^{10}	Modo Hockey (J20 SuperElit)
80	Bryan Rust (RW)	United States	Pittsburgh Penguins	US NTDP (USHL)
81	Louis-Marc Aubry (C)	Canada	Detroit Red Wings	Montreal Junior Hockey Club (QMJHL)
82	Jason Clark (LW/C)	United States	New York Islanders (from Phoenix)^{11}	Shattuck-St. Mary's (Midget Major AAA)
83	Matt MacKenzie (D)	Canada	Buffalo Sabres	Calgary Hitmen (WHL)
84	Scott Wedgewood (G)	Canada	New Jersey Devils	Plymouth Whalers (OHL)
85	Austin Levi (D)	United States	Carolina Hurricanes (from Vancouver)^{12}	Plymouth Whalers (OHL)
86	Stanislav Galiev (RW)	Russia	Washington Capitals	Saint John Sea Dogs (QMJHL)
87	Julian Melchiori (D)	Canada	Atlanta Thrashers (from Montreal)^{13}	Newmarket Hurricanes (CCHL)
88	Max Gaede (RW)	United States	San Jose Sharks	Woodbury High School (USHS–MN)
89	Michael Chaput (C)	Canada	Philadelphia Flyers	Lewiston Maineiacs (QMJHL)
90	Joakim Nordstrom (C)	Sweden	Chicago Blackhawks	AIK IF (J20 SuperElit)

Notes

1. The Florida Panthers' third-round pick went to the Tampa Bay Lightning as the result of a trade on March 3, 2010, that sent Jeff Halpern to the Los Angeles Kings in exchange for Teddy Purcell and this pick.
  Los Angeles previously acquired the pick as the result of a trade on June 27, 2009, that sent a fourth-round pick (#107 overall) in 2009 and a fifth-round pick (#138 overall) in 2009 to Florida in exchange for this pick.
2. The Columbus Blue Jackets' third-round pick went to the Calgary Flames as the result of a trade on September 28, 2009, that sent Anton Stralman to Columbus in exchange for this pick.
3. The Atlanta Thrashers' third-round pick went to the Buffalo Sabres as the result of a trade on March 3, 2010, that sent Clarke MacArthur to Atlanta in exchange for a fourth-round pick in 2010 and this pick.
4. The Minnesota Wild's third round pick went to the Florida Panthers as the result of a trade on June 26, 2010, that send a second-round pick (59th overall) to Minnesota in exchange for a fourth-round pick (99th overall) and this pick.
5. The New York Rangers' third-round pick went to the Los Angeles Kings as the result of a trade on June 27, 2009, that sent Brian Boyle to New York in exchange for this pick.
6. The Dallas Stars' third-round pick (71st overall) went to the Colorado Avalanche as the result of a trade on June 26, 2010, that sent a third-round pick (77th overall) and a fourth-round pick (109th overall) to Dallas.
7. The Anaheim Ducks' third-round pick went to the Tampa Bay Lightning as the result of a trade on August 13, 2009, that sent Evgeny Artyukhin to Anaheim in exchange for Drew Miller and this pick.
8. The Boston Bruins' third-round pick went to the Buffalo Sabres as the result of a trade on October 20, 2009, that sent Daniel Paille to Boston in exchange for a conditional fourth-round pick in 2010 and this pick.
9. The Colorado Avalanche's third-round pick went to the Dallas Stars as the result of a trade on June 26, 2010, that send a third-round pick (71st overall) to Colorado in exchange for a fourth-round pick (109th overall) and this pick.
10. The Los Angeles Kings' third-round pick went to the Toronto Maple Leafs as the result of a trade on June 26, 2010, that send a third-round pick in 2012 to Los Angeles in exchange for this pick.
11. The Phoenix Coyotes' third-round pick went to the New York Islanders as the result of a trade on June 27, 2009, that sent a third-round pick (#62 overall) in 2009 to Phoenix in exchange for this pick.
12. The Vancouver Canucks' third-round pick went to the Carolina Hurricanes as the result of a March 3, 2010, trade that sent Andrew Alberts to the Canucks in exchange for this pick.
13. The Montreal Canadiens' third-round pick went to the Atlanta Thrashers as the result of a trade on February 16, 2009, that sent Mathieu Schneider to Montreal in exchange for Anaheim's second-round pick in 2009 and this pick.

=== Round four ===
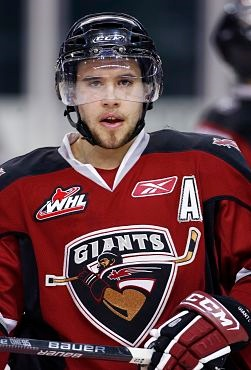
Craig Cunningham, drafted 97th by the Boston Bruins

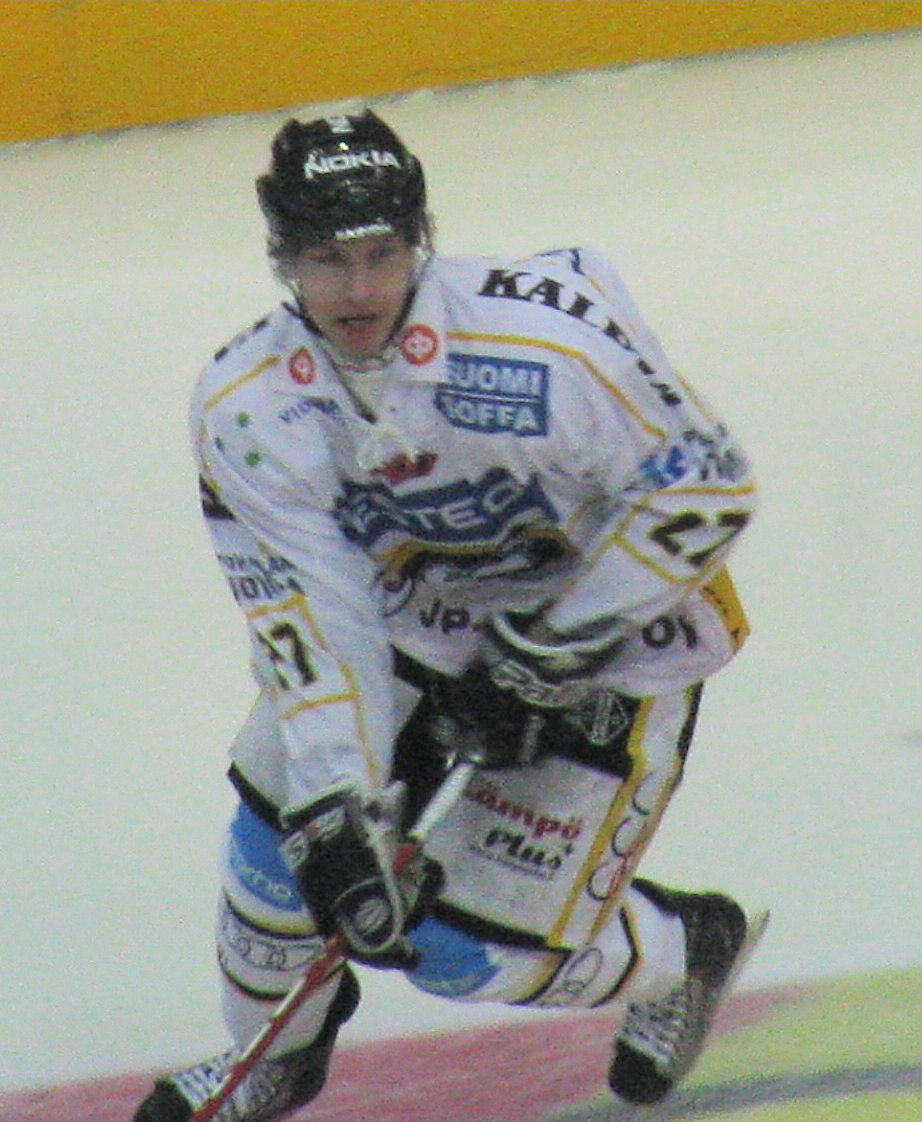
Joonas Donskoi, drafted 99th by the Florida Panthers

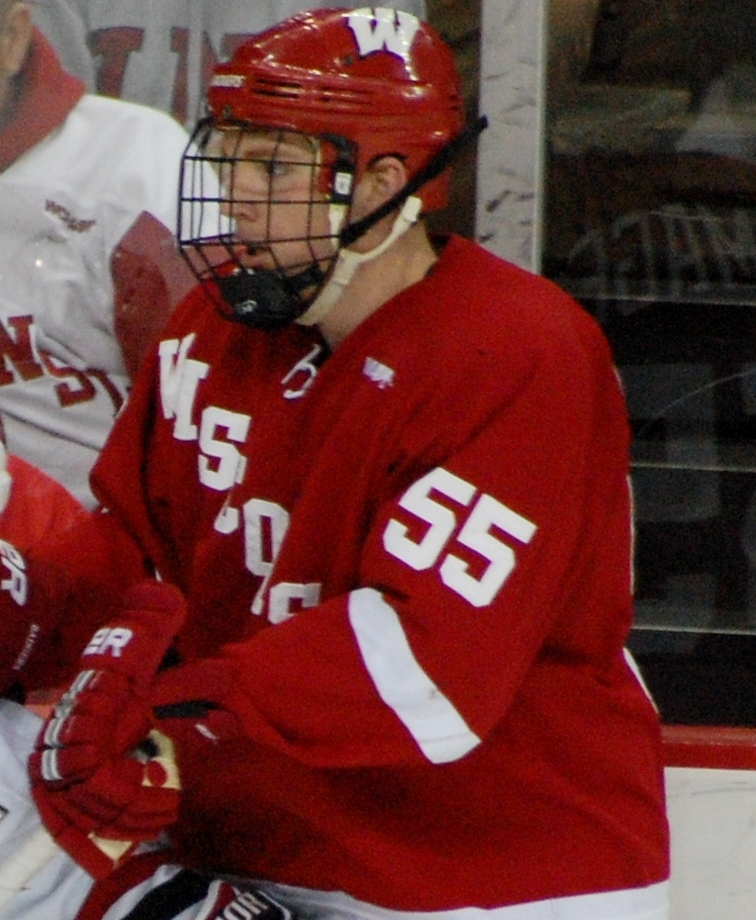
John Ramage, drafted 103rd by the Calgary Flames

#	Player	Nationality	NHL team	College/junior/club team
91	Jeremie Blain (D)	Canada	Edmonton Oilers	Acadie-Bathurst Titan (QMJHL)
92	Sam Brittain (G)	Canada	Florida Panthers (from Toronto)^{1}	Canmore Eagles (AJHL)
93	Benjamin Gallacher (D)	Canada	Florida Panthers	Camrose Kodiaks (AJHL)
94	Brandon Archibald (D)	United States	Columbus Blue Jackets	Sault Ste. Marie Greyhounds (OHL)
95	Stephen Silas (D)	Canada	Colorado Avalanche (from NY Islanders)^{2}	Belleville Bulls (OHL)
96	Geoffrey Schemitsch (D)	Canada	Tampa Bay Lightning	Owen Sound Attack (OHL)
97	Craig Cunningham (LW)	Canada	Boston Bruins (from Carolina)^{3}	Vancouver Giants (WHL)
98	Steven Shipley (C)	Canada	Buffalo Sabres (from Atlanta)^{4}	Owen Sound Attack (OHL)
99	Joonas Donskoi (RW)	Finland	Florida Panthers (from Minnesota)^{5}	Karpat (SM-liiga)
100	Andrew Yogan (C/LW)	United States	New York Rangers	Erie Otters (OHL)
101	Ivan Telegin (LW)	Russia	Atlanta Thrashers (from Dallas)^{6}	Saginaw Spirit (OHL)
102	Mathieu Corbeil-Theriault (G)	Canada	Columbus Blue Jackets (from Anaheim)^{7}	Halifax Mooseheads (QMJHL)
103	John Ramage (D)	United States	Calgary Flames	University of Wisconsin (WCHA)
104	Jani Hakanpaa (D)	Finland	St. Louis Blues	Kiekko-Vantaa (SM-Sarja)
105	Justin Shugg (LW)	Canada	Carolina Hurricanes (from Boston via Anaheim)^{8}	Windsor Spitfires (OHL)
106	Marcus Sorensen (RW)	Sweden	Ottawa Senators	Sodertalje SK (J20 SuperElit)
107	Sami Aittokallio (G)	Finland	Colorado Avalanche	Ilves (SM-liiga Jr.)
108	Bill Arnold (C)	United States	Calgary Flames (from Nashville)^{9}	US NTDP (USHL)
109	Alex Theriau (D)	Canada	Dallas Stars (from Los Angeles via Colorado)^{10}	Everett Silvertips (WHL)
110	Tom Kuhnhackl (RW)	Germany	Pittsburgh Penguins	Landshut Cannibals (2nd Bundesliga)
111	Teemu Pulkkinen (LW)	Finland	Detroit Red Wings	Jokerit (SM-liiga)
112	Philipp Grubauer (G)	Germany	Washington Capitals (from Phoenix via Toronto)^{11}	Windsor Spitfires (OHL)
113	Mark MacMillan (F)	Canada	Montreal Canadiens (from Buffalo via Phoenix)^{12}	Alberni Valley Bulldogs (BCHL)
114	Joe Faust (D)	United States	New Jersey Devils	Bloomington Jefferson High School (United States High School-MN)
115	Patrick McNally (D)	United States	Vancouver Canucks	Milton Academy (USHS–MA)
116	Petter Granberg (D)	Sweden	Toronto Maple Leafs (from Washington)^{13}	Skelleftea AIK (J20 SuperElit)
117	Morgan Ellis (D)	Canada	Montreal Canadiens	Cape Breton Screaming Eagles (QMJHL)
118	James Mullin (C/RW)	United States	Tampa Bay Lightning (from San Jose)^{14}	Shattuck-Saint Mary's (Midget Major AAA)
119	Tye McGinn (LW)	Canada	Philadelphia Flyers	Gatineau Olympiques (QMJHL)
120	Rob Flick (C)	Canada	Chicago Blackhawks	Mississauga St. Michaels Majors (OHL)

Notes

1. The Toronto Maple Leafs' fourth-round pick went to the Florida Panthers as the result of a trade on September 2, 2008, that sent Mike Van Ryn to Toronto in exchange for Bryan McCabe and this pick.
2. The New York Islanders' fourth-round pick went to the Colorado Avalanche as the result of a trade on June 26, 2010, that send a third-round pick in 2011 to Colorado in exchange for this pick.
3. The Carolina Hurricanes' fourth-round pick went to the Boston Bruins as the result of a trade on July 24, 2009, that sent Aaron Ward to Carolina in exchange for Patrick Eaves and this pick.
4. The Atlanta Thrashers' fourth-round pick went to the Buffalo Sabres as the result of a trade on March 3, 2010, that sent Clarke MacArthur to Atlanta in exchange for a third-round pick in 2010 and this pick.
5. The Minnesota Wild's fourth-round pick went to the Florida Panthers as the result of a trade on June 26, 2010, that send a second-round pick (59th overall) to Minnesota in exchange for a third-round pick (69th overall) and this pick.
6. The Dallas Stars' fourth-round pick went to the Atlanta Thrashers as the result of a trade on February 9, 2010, that sent Kari Lehtonen to Dallas in exchange for Ivan Vishnevskiy and this pick.
7. The Anaheim Ducks' fourth-round pick went to the Columbus Blue Jackets as the result of a trade on July 15, 2008, that sent Joakim Lindstrom to Anaheim in exchange for this pick (being conditional at the time of the trade). The condition – Lindstrom appears in more than 40 regular season or 15 playoff games with Anaheim or another team during the 2008–09 season – was converted on April 1, 2009.
8. The Boston Bruins' fourth-round pick went to the Carolina Hurricanes as the result of a trade on March 3, 2010, that sent Aaron Ward to Anaheim in exchange for Justin Pogge and this pick (being conditional at the time of the trade). The condition – Boston does not trade this pick prior to the draft – was converted.
  Anaheim previously acquired this pick as the result of a trade on March 2, 2010, that sent Steven Kampfer to Boston in exchange for this conditional pick.
9. The Nashville Predators' fourth-round pick went to the Calgary Flames as the result of a trade on March 3, 2010, that sent Dustin Boyd to the Predators in exchange for this pick.
10. The Los Angeles Kings' fourth-round pick went to the Dallas Stars as the result of a trade on June 26, 2010, that sent a third-round pick (71st overall) to the Colorado Avalanche in exchange for a third-round pick (77th overall) and this pick.
  Colorado previously acquired the pick as the result of a trade on June 26, 2010, that sent a second-round pick (47th overall) to Los Angeles in exchange for a second-round pick (49th overall) and this pick.
11. The Phoenix Coyotes' fourth-round pick went to the Washington Capitals as the result of a trade on June 26, 2010, that sent a fourth-round pick (116th overall) and a fifth-round pick (146th overall) to the Toronto Maple Leafs in exchange for this pick.
  Toronto previously acquired the pick as the result of a trade on March 3, 2010, that sent Lee Stempniak to Phoenix in exchange for Matt Jones, the Coyotes' seventh-round pick in 2010, and this pick.
12. The Buffalo Sabres' first-round pick went to the Montreal Canadiens as the result of a trade on June 25, 2010, that sent a first-round pick (27th overall) and a second-round pick (57th overall) to the Phoenix Coyotes in exchange for a first-round pick (22nd overall) and this pick.
  Phoenix previously acquired this pick as the result of a trade on March 4, 2009, that sent Mikael Tellqvist to Buffalo in exchange for this pick.
13. The Washington Capitals' fourth-round pick went to the Toronto Maple Leafs as the result of a trade on June 26, 2010, that sent a fourth-round pick (112th overall) to Washington in exchange for a fifth-round pick (146th overall) and this pick.
14. The San Jose Sharks' fourth-round pick went to the Tampa Bay Lightning as the result of a trade on July 4, 2008, that sent Dan Boyle and Brad Lukowich to San Jose in exchange for Matt Carle, Ty Wishart, a first-round pick in 2009 and this pick.

=== Round five ===
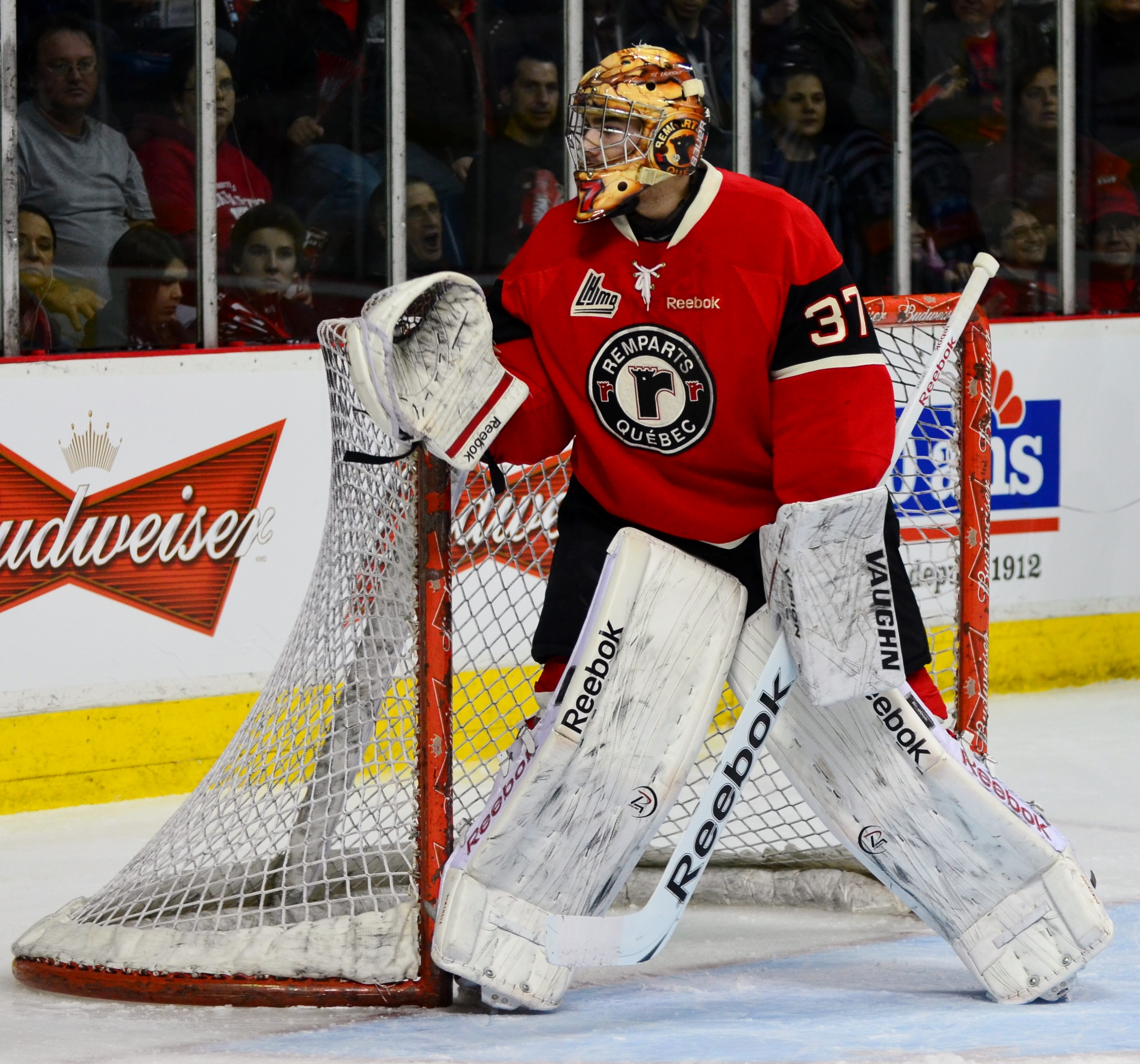
Louis Domingue, drafted 138th by the Phoenix Coyotes

#	Player	Nationality	NHL team	College/junior/club team
121	Tyler Bunz (G)	Canada	Edmonton Oilers	Medicine Hat Tigers (WHL)
122	Chris Wagner (RW)	United States	Anaheim Ducks (from Toronto)^{1}	South Shore Kings (EJHL)
123	Zach Hyman (C)	Canada	Florida Panthers	Hamilton Red Wings (CCHL)
124	Austin Madaisky (D)	Canada	Columbus Blue Jackets	Kamloops Blazers (WHL)
125	Tony DeHart (D)	United States	New York Islanders	Oshawa Generals (OHL)
126	Patrick Cehlin (RW)	Sweden	Nashville Predators (from Tampa Bay)^{2}	Djurgardens IF (Elitserien)
127	Cody Ferriero (C)	United States	San Jose Sharks (from Carolina)^{3}	The Governor's Academy (USHS–MA)
128	Fredrik Pettersson-Wentzel (G)	Sweden	Atlanta Thrashers	Almtuna IS (HockeyAllsvenskan)
129	Freddie Hamilton (C)	Canada	San Jose Sharks (from Minnesota)^{4}	Niagara IceDogs (OHL)
130	Jason Wilson (RW)	Canada	New York Rangers	Owen Sound Attack (OHL)
131	John Klingberg (D)	Sweden	Dallas Stars	Frolunda HC (J20 SuperElit)
132	Tim Heed (D)	Sweden	Anaheim Ducks	Sodertalje SK (Elitserien)
133	Micheal Ferland (LW)	Canada	Calgary Flames	Brandon Wheat Kings (WHL)
134	Cody Beach (RW)	Canada	St. Louis Blues	Calgary Hitmen (WHL)
135	Justin Florek (LW)	United States	Boston Bruins	Northern Michigan University (CCHA)
136	Isaac Macleod (D)	Canada	San Jose Sharks (from Ottawa)^{5}	Penticton Vees (BCHL)
137	Troy Rutkowski (D)	Canada	Colorado Avalanche	Portland Winterhawks (WHL)
138	Louis Domingue (G)	Canada	Phoenix Coyotes (from Nashville via Carolina)^{6}	Quebec Remparts (QMJHL)
139	Luke Walker (RW)	United States	Colorado Avalanche (from Los Angeles)^{7}	Portland Winterhawks (WHL)
140	Kenny Agostino (LW)	United States	Pittsburgh Penguins	Delbarton School (United States High School-NJ)
141	Petr Mrazek (G)	Czech Republic	Detroit Red Wings	Ottawa 67's (OHL)
142	Caleb Herbert (C)	United States	Washington Capitals (from Phoenix)^{8}	Bloomington Jefferson High School (USHS–MN)
143	Gregg Sutch (RW)	Canada	Buffalo Sabres	Mississauga St. Michael's Majors (OHL)
144	Sam Carrick (RW)	Canada	Toronto Maple Leafs (from New Jersey)^{9}	Brampton Battalion (OHL)
145	Adam Polasek (D)	Czech Republic	Vancouver Canucks	P.E.I. Rocket (QMJHL)
146	Daniel Brodin (LW)	Sweden	Toronto Maple Leafs (from Washington) ^{10}	Djurgardens IF (Elitserien)
147	Brendan Gallagher (RW)	Canada	Montreal Canadiens	Vancouver Giants (WHL)
148	Kevin Gravel (D)	United States	Los Angeles Kings (from San Jose)^{11}	Sioux City Musketeers (USHL)
149	Michael Parks (F)	United States	Philadelphia Flyers	Cedar Rapids RoughRiders (USHL)
150	Yasin Cisse (RW)	Canada	Atlanta Thrashers (from Chicago)^{12}	Des Moines Buccaneers (USHL)

Notes

1. The Toronto Maple Leafs' fifth-round pick went to the Anaheim Ducks as the result of a trade on June 26, 2010, that sent Mike Brown to Toronto in exchange for this pick.
2. The Tampa Bay Lightning's fifth-round pick went to the Nashville Predators as the result of a trade on June 27, 2009, that sent a fifth-round pick (#148 overall) in 2009 to Tampa Bay in exchange for this pick.
3. The Carolina Hurricanes' fifth-round pick went to the San Jose Sharks as the result of a trade on February 7, 2010, that sent Buffalo's second-round pick in 2010 to Carolina in exchange for Niclas Wallin and this pick.
4. The Minnesota Wild's fifth-round pick went to the San Jose Sharks as the result of a trade on June 21, 2010, that sent Brad Staubitz to Minnesota in exchange for this pick.
5. The Ottawa Senators' fifth-round pick went to the San Jose Sharks as the result of a trade on September 12, 2009, that sent Milan Michalek, Jonathan Cheechoo and a second-round pick in 2010 to Ottawa in exchange for Dany Heatley and this pick.
6. The Los Angeles Kings' fifth-round pick went to the Colorado Avalanche as the result of a trade on July 3, 2009, that sent Ryan Smyth to Los Angeles in exchange for Tom Preissing, Kyle Quincey and this pick.
7. The Nashville Predators' fifth-round pick went to the Phoenix Coyotes as a result of a trade on May 13, 2010, that sent Jared Staal to Carolina in exchange for this pick.
  Carolina previously acquired this pick as the result of a trade on June 19, 2008, that sent a fifth-round pick in 2009 to Nashville in exchange for Darcy Hordichuk and this pick (being conditional at the time of the trade). The condition – Hordichuk is not signed by Carolina prior to the 2008–09 season – was converted on July 1, 2008, when the player was signed by the Vancouver Canucks.
8. The Phoenix Coyotes' fifth-round pick went to the Washington Capitals as the result of a trade on June 27, 2009, that sent Sami Lepisto to Phoenix in exchange for this pick.
9. The New Jersey Devils' fifth-round pick went to the Toronto Maple Leafs as the result of a trade on March 3, 2010, that sent Martin Skoula to the Devils in exchange for this pick.
10. The Washington Capitals' fifth-round pick went to the Toronto Maple Leafs as the result of a trade on June 26, 2010, that sent a fourth-round pick (112th overall) to Washington in exchange for a fourth-round pick (116th overall) and this pick.
11. The San Jose Sharks' fifth-round pick went to the Los Angeles Kings as the result of a trade on June 21, 2008, that sent a fourth-round pick in 2008 to San Jose in exchange for a fourth-round pick in 2009 and this pick.
12. The Chicago Blackhawks' fifth-round pick went to the Atlanta Thrashers as the result of a trade on June 27, 2009, that sent a sixth-round pick (#177 overall) in 2009 to Chicago in exchange for this pick.

=== Round six ===
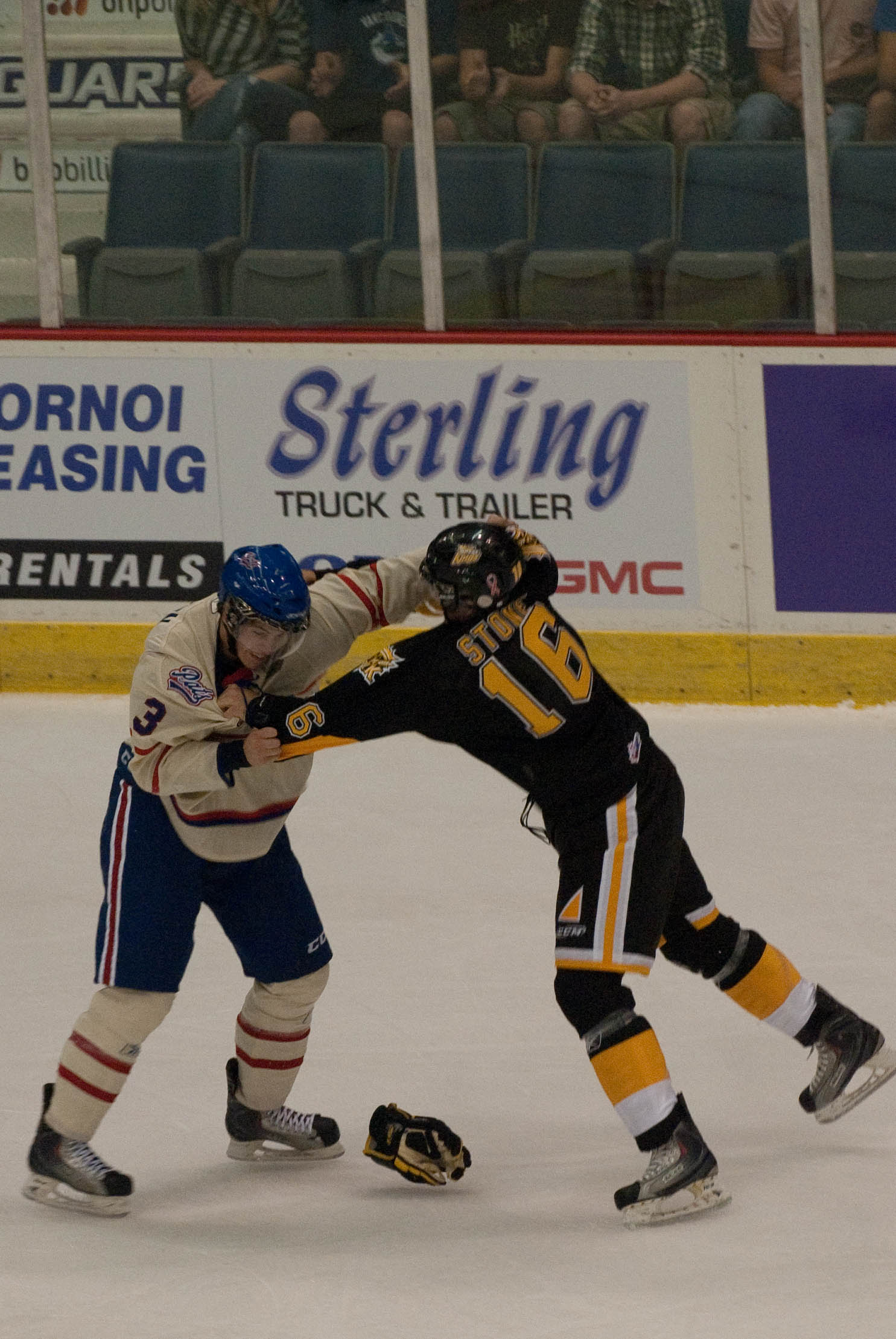
Brandon Davidson and Mark Stone, drafted respectively 162nd by the Edmonton Oilers and 178th by the Ottawa Senators

#	Player	Nationality	NHL team	College/junior/club team
151	Mirko Hofflin (C)	Germany	Chicago Blackhawks (from Edmonton)^{1}	Jungadler Mannheim (DNL)
152	Joe Rogalski (D)	United States	Pittsburgh Penguins (from Toronto)^{2}	Sarnia Sting (OHL)
153	Corey Durocher (C)	Canada	Florida Panthers	Kingston Frontenacs (OHL)
154	Dalton Prout (D)	Canada	Columbus Blue Jackets	Barrie Colts (OHL)
155	Kendall McFaull (D)	Canada	Atlanta Thrashers (from NY Islanders)^{3}	Moose Jaw Warriors (WHL)
156	Brendan O'Donnell (C)	Canada	Tampa Bay Lightning	Winnipeg South Blues (MJHL)
157	Jesper Fast (RW)	Sweden	New York Rangers (from Carolina)^{4}	HV71 (J20 SuperElit)
158	Maxim Kitsyn (LW)	Russia	Los Angeles Kings (from Atlanta)^{5}	Metallurg Novokuznetsk (KHL)
159	Johan Gustafsson (G)	Sweden	Minnesota Wild	Farjestad BK (Elitserien)
160	Tanner Lane (C)	United States	Atlanta Thrashers (from NY Rangers via NY Islanders)^{6}	Detroit Lakes High School (USHS–MN)
161	Andreas Dahlstrom (C)	Sweden	Anaheim Ducks (from Dallas)^{7}	AIK IF (HockeyAllsvenskan)
162	Brandon Davidson (D)	Canada	Edmonton Oilers (from Anaheim)^{8}	Regina Pats (WHL)
163	Konrad Abeltshauser (D)	Germany	San Jose Sharks (from Calgary)^{9}	Halifax Mooseheads (QMJHL)
164	Stephen MacAulay (LW)	Canada	St. Louis Blues	Saint John Sea Dogs (QMJHL)
165	Zane Gothberg (G)	United States	Boston Bruins	Lincoln High School (USHS–MN)
166	Drew Czerwonka (LW)	Canada	Edmonton Oilers (from Ottawa)^{10}	Kootenay Ice (WHL)
167	Tyler Stahl (D)	Canada	Carolina Hurricanes (from Colorado)^{11}	Chilliwack Bruins (WHL)
168	Anthony Bitetto (D)	United States	Nashville Predators	Indiana Ice (USHL)
169	Sebastian Owuya (D)	Sweden	Atlanta Thrashers (from Los Angeles)^{12}	Timra IK (J20 SuperElit)
170	Reid McNeill (D)	Canada	Pittsburgh Penguins	London Knights (OHL)
171	Brooks Macek (C)	Canada	Detroit Red Wings	Tri-City Americans (WHL)
172	Alex Friesen (C)	Canada	Vancouver Canucks (from Phoenix)^{13}	Niagara IceDogs (OHL)
173	Cedrick Henley (LW)	Canada	Buffalo Sabres	Val-d'Or Foreurs (QMJHL)
174	Maxime Clermont (G)	Canada	New Jersey Devils	Gatineau Olympiques (QMJHL)
175	Jonathan Iilahti (G)	Finland	Vancouver Canucks	Blues (SM-liiga Jr.)
176	Samuel Carrier (RW)	Canada	Washington Capitals	Lewiston Maineiacs (QMJHL)
177	Kevin Lind (D)	United States	Anaheim Ducks (from Montreal via Pittsburgh)^{14}	Chicago Steel (USHL)
178	Mark Stone (RW)	Canada	Ottawa Senators (from San Jose via Dallas)^{15}	Brandon Wheat Kings (WHL)
179	Nick Luukko (D)	United States	Philadelphia Flyers	The Gunnery (USHS–CT)
180	Nick Mattson (D)	United States	Chicago Blackhawks	Indiana Ice (USHL)

Notes

1. The Edmonton Oilers' sixth-round pick went to the Chicago Blackhawks as the result of a trade on June 24, 2010, that send Colin Fraser to Edmonton in exchange for this pick.
2. The Toronto Maple Leafs' sixth-round pick went to the Pittsburgh Penguins as the result of a trade on March 3, 2010, that sent Chris Peluso to the Maple Leafs in exchange for this pick.
3. The New York Islanders' sixth-round pick went to the Atlanta Thrashers as the result of a trade on June 26, 2010, that sent a fifth-round pick in 2011 to New York in exchange for a sixth-round pick (160th overall) and this pick.
4. The Carolina Hurricanes' sixth-round pick went to the New York Rangers as the result of a trade on June 26, 2010, that sent Bobby Sanguinetti to Carolina in exchange for a second-round pick in 2011 and this pick.
5. The Atlanta Thrashers' sixth-round pick went to the Los Angeles Kings as the result of a trade on June 26, 2010, that sent a sixth-round pick (169th overall) and a seventh-round pick (199th overall) to Los Angeles in exchange for this pick.
6. The New York Rangers' sixth-round pick went to the Atlanta Thrashers as the result of a trade on June 26, 2010, that sent a fifth-round pick in 2011 to the New York Islanders in exchange for a sixth-round pick (155th overall) and this pick.
  The Islanders previously acquired the pick as the result of a trade on May 25, 2010, that sent Jyri Niemi to the NY Rangers in exchange for this pick.
7. The Dallas Stars' sixth-round pick went to the Anaheim Ducks as the result of a trade on December 14, 2008, that sent Brian Sutherby to Dallas in exchange for David McIntyre and this pick (being conditional at the time of the trade). The converted condition attached to this pick is unknown.
8. The Anaheim Ducks' sixth-round pick went to the Edmonton Oilers as the result of a trade on March 3, 2010, that sent Lubomir Visnovsky to Anaheim in exchange for Ryan Whitney and this pick.
9. The Calgary Flames' sixth-round pick went to the San Jose Sharks as the result of a trade on June 26, 2010, that sent Henrik Karlsson to Calgary in exchange for this pick.
10. The Ottawa Senators' sixth-round pick went to the Edmonton Oilers as the result of a trade on June 27, 2009, that sent a seventh-round pick (#191 overall) in 2009 to Ottawa in exchange for this pick.
11. The Colorado Avalanche's sixth-round pick went to the Carolina Hurricanes as the result of a March 3, 2010, trade that sent Stephane Yelle and Harrison Reed to the Avalanche in exchange for Cedric McNicoll and this pick.
12. The Los Angeles Kings' sixth-round pick went to the Atlanta Thrashers as the result of a trade on June 26, 2010, that sent a sixth-round pick (158th overall) to Los Angeles in exchange for a seventh-round pick (199th overall) and this pick.
13. The Phoenix Coyotes' sixth-round pick went to the Vancouver Canucks as the result of a trade on March 3, 2010, that sent Mathieu Schneider to Phoenix in exchange for Sean Zimmerman and this pick (being conditional at the time of the trade). The condition – Schneider successfully clears re-entry waivers – was converted.
14. The Montreal Canadiens' sixth-round pick went to the Anaheim Ducks as the result of a trade on May 28, 2010, that sent Mattias Modig to Pittsburgh in exchange for this pick.
  Pittsburgh previously acquired the pick as the result of a trade on June 27, 2009, that sent a seventh-round pick (#211 overall) in 2009 to Montreal in exchange for this pick.
15. The San Jose Sharks' sixth-round pick went to the Ottawa Senators as the result of a trade on July 8, 2009, that sent Alex Auld to Dallas in exchange for this pick.
  Dallas previously acquired the pick as the result of a trade on June 27, 2009, that sent a seventh-round pick (#189 overall) in 2009 to San Jose in exchange for this pick.

=== Round seven ===
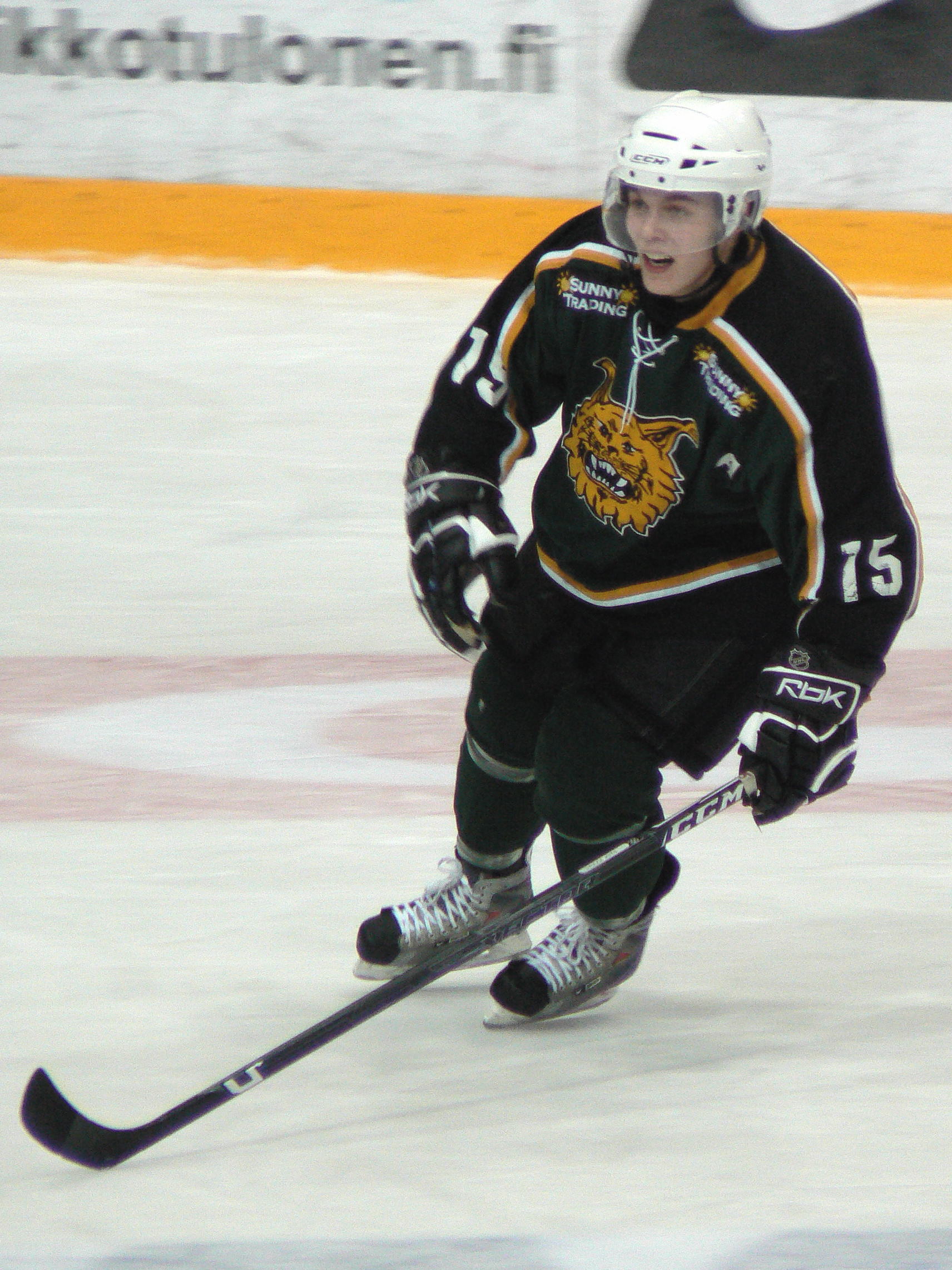
Joonas Rask, drafted 198th by the Nashville Predators

#	Player	Nationality	NHL team	College/junior/club team
181	Kristians Pelss (F)	Latvia	Edmonton Oilers	Dinamo Juniors Riga (Belarusian Extraleague)
182	Josh Nicholls (RW)	Canada	Toronto Maple Leafs	Saskatoon Blades (WHL)
183	Ronald Boyd (D)	United States	Florida Panthers	Cushing Academy (USHS–MA)
184	Martin Ouellette (G)	Canada	Columbus Blue Jackets	Kimball Union Academy (USHS–NH)
185	Cody Rosen (G)	Canada	New York Islanders	Clarkson University (ECAC)
186	Teigan Zahn (D)	Canada	Tampa Bay Lightning	Saskatoon Blades (WHL)
187	Frederik Andersen (G)	Denmark	Carolina Hurricanes	Frederikshavn White Hawks (AL-Bank Ligaen)
188	Lee Moffie (D)	United States	San Jose Sharks (from Atlanta)^{1}	University of Michigan (CCHA)
189	Dylen McKinlay (RW)	Canada	Minnesota Wild	Chilliwack Bruins (WHL)
190	Randy McNaught (F)	Canada	New York Rangers	Saskatoon Blades (WHL)
191	Macmillan Carruth (G)	United States	Chicago Blackhawks (from Dallas)^{2}	Portland Winterhawks (WHL)
192	Brett Perlini (RW)	Canada	Anaheim Ducks	Michigan State University (CCHA)
193	Patrick Holland (RW)	Canada	Calgary Flames	Tri-City Americans (WHL)
194	David Elsner (F)	Germany	Nashville Predators (from St. Louis)^{3}	Landshut Cannibals (2nd Bundesliga)
195	Maxim Chudinov (D)	Russia	Boston Bruins	HC Severstal (KHL)
196	Bryce Aneloski (D)	United States	Ottawa Senators	Cedar Rapids RoughRiders (USHL)
197	Luke Moffatt (C)	United States	Colorado Avalanche	US NTDP (USHL)
198	Joonas Rask (C)	Finland	Nashville Predators	Ilves (SM-liiga)
199	Peter Stoykewych (D)	Canada	Atlanta Thrashers (from Los Angeles)^{4}	Winnipeg South Blues (MJHL)
200	Chris Crane (RW)	United States	San Jose Sharks (from Pittsburgh)^{5}	Green Bay Gamblers (USHL)
201	Ben Marshall (D)	United States	Detroit Red Wings	Mahtomedi Senior High School (United States High School-MN)
202	Kellen Jones (F)	Canada	Edmonton Oilers (from Phoenix via Toronto)^{6}	Vernon Vipers (BCHL)
203	Christian Isackson (RW)	United States	Buffalo Sabres	Saint Thomas Academy (United States High School-MN)
204	Mauro Jorg (LW)	Switzerland	New Jersey Devils	HC Lugano (National League A)
205	Sawyer Hannay (D)	Canada	Vancouver Canucks	Halifax Mooseheads (QMJHL)
206	Ricard Blidstrand (D)	Sweden	Philadelphia Flyers (from Washington via Carolina)^{7}	AIK IF (J20 SuperElit)
207	John Westin (LW)	Sweden	Montreal Canadiens	Modo Hockey (J20 SuperElit)
208	Riley Boychuk (LW)	Canada	Buffalo Sabres (from San Jose)^{8}	Portland Winterhawks (WHL)
209	Brendan Ranford (LW)	Canada	Philadelphia Flyers	Kamloops Blazers (WHL)
210	Zach Trotman (D)	United States	Boston Bruins (from Chicago)^{9}	Lake Superior State University (CCHA)

Notes

1. The Atlanta Thrashers' seventh-round pick went to the San Jose Sharks as the result of a trade on June 23, 2010, that sent Michael Vernace, Brett Sterling and this pick to San Jose in exchange for future considerations.
2. The Dallas Stars' seventh-round pick went to the Chicago Blackhawks as the result of a trade on October 8, 2008, that sent Doug Janik to Dallas in exchange for this pick (being conditional at the time of the trade). The converted condition attached to this pick is unknown.
3. The St. Louis Blues' seventh-round pick went to the Nashville Predators as the result of a trade on June 27, 2009, that sent a seventh-round pick (#202 overall) in 2009 to Nashville in exchange for this pick.
4. The Los Angeles Kings' seventh-round pick went to the Atlanta Thrashers as the result of a trade on June 26, 2010, that sent a sixth-round pick (158th overall) to Los Angeles in exchange for a sixth-round pick (169th overall) and this pick.
5. The Pittsburgh Penguins' seventh-round pick went to the San Jose Sharks as the result of a trade on June 26, 2010, that sent a seventh-round pick in 2011 to Pittsburgh in exchange for this pick.
6. The Phoenix Coyotes' seventh-round pick went to the Edmonton Oilers as the result of a trade on June 26, 2010, that sent a sixth-round pick in 2011 to Toronto in exchange for this pick.
  Toronto previously acquired the pick as the result of a trade on March 3, 2010, that sent Lee Stempniak to Phoenix in exchange for Matt Jones, the Coyotes' fourth-round pick in 2010, and this pick.
7. The Washington Capitals' seventh-round pick went to the Philadelphia Flyers as the result of a trade on June 26, 2010, that sent Jon Matsumoto to Carolina in exchange for this pick.
  Carolina previously acquired the pick as the result of a trade on March 3, 2010, that sent Scott Walker to Washington in exchange for this pick.
8. The San Jose Sharks' seventh-round pick went to the Buffalo Sabres as the result of a trade on July 4, 2008, that sent second-round picks in 2009 and 2010 to San Jose in exchange for Craig Rivet and this pick.
9. The Chicago Blackhawks' seventh-round pick went to the Boston Bruins as the result of a trade on June 26, 2010, that sent a seventh-round pick in 2011 to Chicago in exchange for this pick.

== Draftees based on nationality ==
Rank	Country	Picks	Percent	Top selection
	North America	158	75.2%	
1	Canada	99	47.1%	Taylor Hall, 1st
2	United States	59	28.1%	Jack Campbell, 11th
	Europe	52	24.8%	
3	Sweden	20	9.5%	Ludvig Rensfeldt, 35th
4	Russia	8	3.8%	Alexander Burmistrov, 8th
5	Finland	7	3.3%	Mikael Granlund, 9th
6	Czech Republic	5	2.4%	Petr Straka, 55th
6	Germany	5	2.4%	Tom Kuhnhackl, 110th
8	Slovakia	2	1.0%	Adam Janosik, 72nd
8	Switzerland	2	1.0%	Nino Niederreiter, 5th
10	Denmark	1	0.5%	Frederik Andersen, 187th
10	Latvia	1	0.5%	Kristians Pelss, 181st
10	Norway	1	0.5%	Sondre Olden, 79th

== North American draftees by state/province ==
Rank	State/Province	Selections	Top selection
1	Ontario	35	Tyler Seguin, 2nd
2	British Columbia	21	Ryan Johansen, 4th
3	Minnesota	15	Derek Forbort, 15th
4	Quebec	13	Danny Biega, 67th
5	Alberta	12	Taylor Hall, 1st
6	Michigan	11	Jack Campbell, 11th
7	Manitoba	8	Dylan McIlrath, 10th
8	Saskatchewan	6	Jaden Schwartz, 14th
8	Massachusetts	6	Kevin Hayes, 24th
10	California	4	Beau Bennett, 20th
10	New York	4	Phillip Lane, 52nd
12	Pennsylvania	3	Stephen Johns, 60th
12	Missouri	3	John Ramage, 103rd
14	Prince Edward Island	2	Brandon Gormley, 13th
14	Connecticut	2	Brock Beukeboom, 63rd
14	Florida	2	Andrew Yogan, 100th
14	Illinois	2	Kevin Lind, 177th
18	Maryland	1	Jared Tinordi, 22nd
18	Nevada	1	Jason Zucker, 59th
18	Colorado	1	Austin Levi, 85th
18	New Jersey	1	Ken Agostino, 140th
18	Nova Scotia	1	Stephen MacAulay, 164th
18	North Dakota	1	Zane Gothberg, 165th
18	Utah	1	Mac Carruth, 191st
18	Ohio	1	Chris Crane, 200th
18	New Brunswick	1	Sawyer Hannay, 205th

== See also ==
- 2008–09 NHL transactions
- 2009–10 NHL transactions
- 2010–11 NHL season
- List of NHL first overall draft choices
- List of NHL players
