= John Westin =

Swedish ice hockey player

- Born: 19 May 1992 (age 33) Kramfors, Sweden
- Height: 5 ft 11 in (180 cm)
- Weight: 196 lb (89 kg; 14 st 0 lb)
- Position: Left wing
- Shot: Left
- Played for: Modo Hockey; Timrå IK
- NHL draft: 207th overall, 2010; Montreal Canadiens
- Playing career: 2011–2018

John Westin (born 19 May 1992) is a Swedish former professional ice hockey forward. He was selected in the seventh round, 207th overall, by the Montreal Canadiens in the 2010 NHL entry draft.

After suffering a broken arm during the 2010 pre-season, Westin made his Elitserien debut for Modo Hockey on 19 February 2011 against Djurgården. His older brother Jens also plays professionally and was formerly a teammate at Modo and Timrå IK.
