= Jens Westin =

Swedish ice hockey player (born 1989)

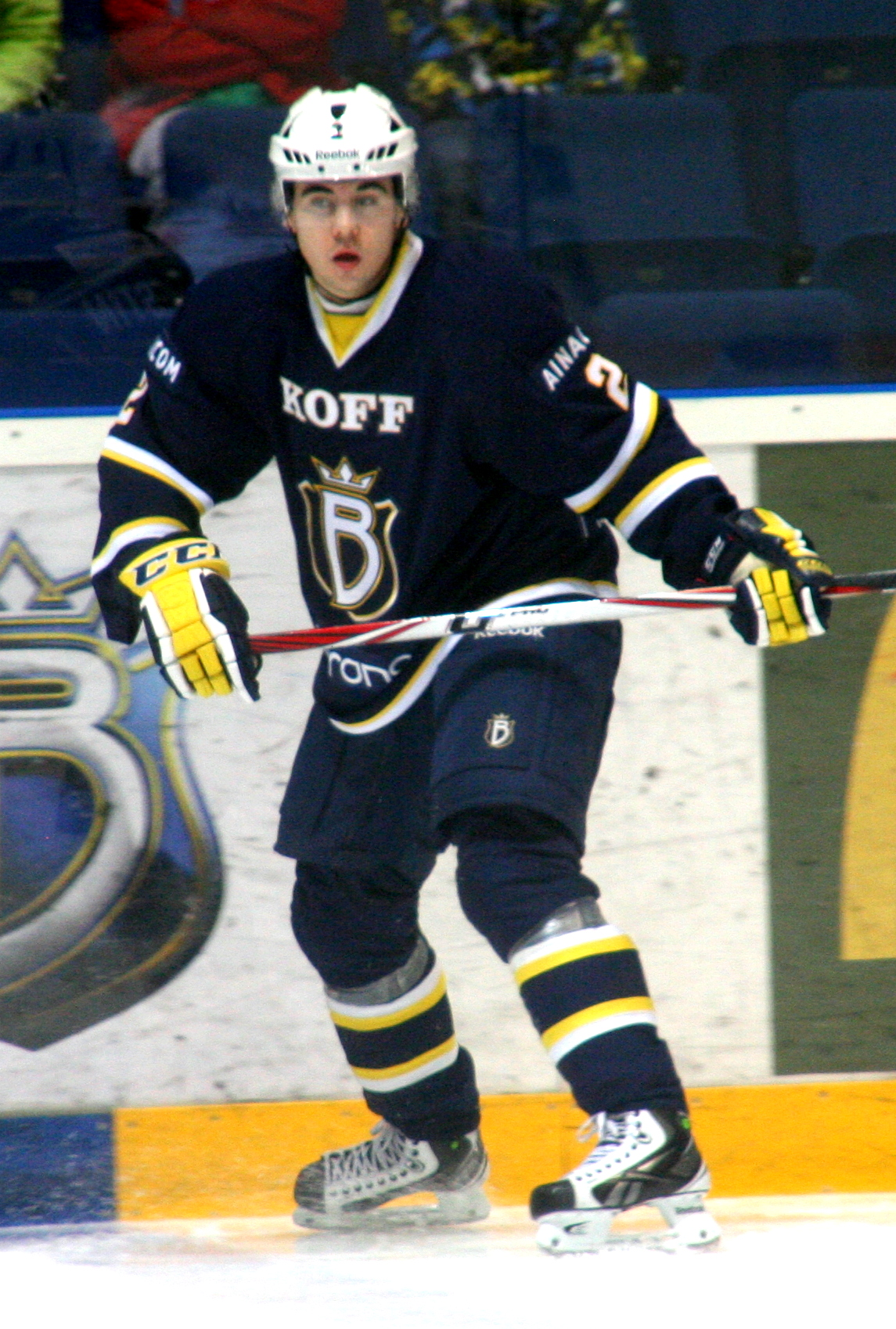
- Born: June 29, 1989 (age 37) Kramfors, Sweden
- Height: 5 ft 11 in (180 cm)
- Weight: 194 lb (88 kg; 13 st 12 lb)
- Position: Defence
- Shot: Left
- Played for: Modo Hockey; Espoo Blues; Färjestad BK
- Playing career: 2007–2023

Jens Thomas Erik Vestin (born June 29, 1989) is a Swedish professional ice hockey defenseman currently playing for Färjestad BK in the Swedish Hockey League (SHL).

He made his debut playing for Modo Hockey in the Elitserien in the 2007–08 season. His younger brother, John, also plays professionally and was formerly a teammate at Modo and Timrå IK.

== Career statistics ==
			Regular season					Playoffs
Season	Team	League	GP	G	A	Pts	PIM	GP	G	A	Pts	PIM
2004–05	Kramfors-Alliansen	Division 2	4	0	0	0	0	—	—	—	—	—
2005–06	Kramfors-Alliansen	Division 1	30	0	2	2	12	—	—	—	—	—
2006–07	MODO Hockey J18	J18 Allsvenskan	6	1	0	1	0	—	—	—	—	—
2006–07	MODO Hockey J20	J20 SuperElit	33	2	4	6	16	4	0	0	0	0
2007–08	MODO Hockey J20	J20 SuperElit	27	5	3	8	14	3	0	2	2	2
2007–08	MODO Hockey	Elitserien	33	2	1	3	16	5	0	0	0	2
2007–08	AIK Härnösand	Division 1	1	0	0	0	0	—	—	—	—	—
2008–09	MODO Hockey J20	J20 SuperElit	11	0	4	4	4	5	0	1	1	2
2008–09	MODO Hockey	Elitserien	48	1	1	2	16	—	—	—	—	—
2008–09	IF Björklöven	HockeyAllsvenskan	2	0	0	0	0	—	—	—	—	—
2009–10	MODO Hockey J20	J20 SuperElit	2	0	0	0	0	—	—	—	—	—
2009–10	MODO Hockey	Elitserien	36	0	3	3	6	—	—	—	—	—
2009–10	IF Sundsvall Hockey	HockeyAllsvenskan	20	4	2	6	8	—	—	—	—	—
2010–11	MODO Hockey J20	J20 SuperElit	1	0	0	0	0	—	—	—	—	—
2010–11	MODO Hockey	Elitserien	44	0	7	7	14	—	—	—	—	—
2011–12	MODO Hockey J20	J20 SuperElit	1	0	0	0	0	—	—	—	—	—
2011–12	MODO Hockey	Elitserien	30	2	1	3	4	6	0	0	0	0
2012–13	Espoo Blues	SM-liiga	50	3	5	8	14	—	—	—	—	—
2013–14	Timrå IK	HockeyAllsvenskan	52	4	9	13	22	—	—	—	—	—
2014–15	Timrå IK	HockeyAllsvenskan	44	0	1	1	18	—	—	—	—	—
2015–16	Timrå IK	HockeyAllsvenskan	45	4	7	11	24	5	0	1	1	0
2016–17	Timrå IK	HockeyAllsvenskan	50	3	12	15	14	4	0	1	1	2
2017–18	Färjestad BK	SHL	52	2	8	10	8	6	0	0	0	0
2018–19	Färjestad BK	SHL	52	2	9	11	8	14	0	3	3	2
2019–20	Färjestad BK	SHL	31	1	3	4	6	—	—	—	—	—
2020–21	Färjestad BK	SHL	40	1	7	8	12	5	1	0	1	2
2021–22	Färjestad BK	SHL	8	0	1	1	0	—	—	—	—	—
2022–23	Färjestad BK	SHL	—	—	—	—	—	—	—	—	—	—
SHL/Elitserien totals			374	11	41	52	90	36	1	3	4	6
SM-liiga totals			50	3	5	8	14	—	—	—	—	—
HockeyAllsvenskan totals			213	15	31	46	86	18	0	9	9	6

== Awards and honours ==
Award	Year
SHL
Le Mat Trophy (Färjestad BK)	2022
