= 2008–09 Calgary Flames season =

NHL team season

2008–09 Calgary Flames
- Division: 2nd Northwest
- Conference: 5th Western
- 2008–09 record: 46–30–6
- Home record: 27–10–4
- Road record: 19–20–2
- Goals for: 254
- Goals against: 248

Team information
- General manager: Darryl Sutter
- Coach: Mike Keenan
- Captain: Jarome Iginla
- Alternate captains: Dion Phaneuf; Robyn Regehr
- Arena: Pengrowth Saddledome
- Average attendance: 19,289

Team leaders
- Goals: Mike Cammalleri (39)
- Assists: Jarome Iginla (54)
- Points: Jarome Iginla (89)
- Penalty minutes: Cory Sarich (112)
- Plus/minus: Craig Conroy (+20)
- Wins: Miikka Kiprusoff (45)
- Goals against average: Miikka Kiprusoff (2.84)

The 2008–09 Calgary Flames season was the 29th season for the Calgary Flames, and the 37th for the Flames franchise in the National Hockey League (NHL). The Flames finished second in the Northwest Division, and qualified for the 2009 Stanley Cup Playoffs as the fifth seed in the Western Conference, their fifth consecutive appearance in the post season. Their season ended when they were defeated by the Chicago Blackhawks in the Western Conference quarter-finals.

The year began with the 2008 NHL entry draft, which saw the Flames select forward Greg Nemisz with their first round selection. The Flames made several trades during the draft, acquiring forward Mike Cammalleri from the Los Angeles Kings as part of a three-way trade that saw Calgary deal the 17th overall pick to the Anaheim Ducks. They then sent Alex Tanguay to the Montreal Canadiens in exchange for the 25th overall pick, with each team adding lower round picks to the deal. The Flames signed forward Todd Bertuzzi during the off-season, a move that generated controversy amongst a fan base with which he had been previously unpopular. Calgary was also active at the trade deadline, making three deals, including a significant trade to add Olli Jokinen from the Phoenix Coyotes.

Jarome Iginla surpassed Theoren Fleury's franchise record of 830 points during the season, scoring his 831st point on the same night he recorded his 400th goal against the Tampa Bay Lightning as part of his second career five-point game. Iginla also scored his 400th career assist during the season, and scored his first all-star goal in his fifth appearance at the 2009 All-Star Game in Montreal. Eight players made their NHL debuts with the Flames in 2008–09.

== Regular season ==
The Flames began the season with five games against divisional opposition. Despite holding leads in four of those games, Calgary won only one game, lost three in regulation, and a fourth in overtime. Goaltender Miikka Kiprusoff became the focus of the team's early struggles, as his play was argued to be a major cause of the Flames' inability to hold a lead. Calgary rebounded with a six-game winning streak, during which Kiprusoff allowed only nine goals on 152 shots. The team again struggled to win games at the start of November, losing five games in seven, including a pair of 6–1 losses to the Chicago Blackhawks and San Jose Sharks that led head coach Mike Keenan to cancel a planned mini-vacation for the players. The cancellation appeared to be a turning point in the season, as the Flames recorded a mark of 15–4–3 following the loss, including a dominating 5–2 victory over the Sharks at home. The Flames again beat the Sharks, 3–2 in San Jose, on January 15, to end the Sharks streak of 31 games without a home loss in regulation.

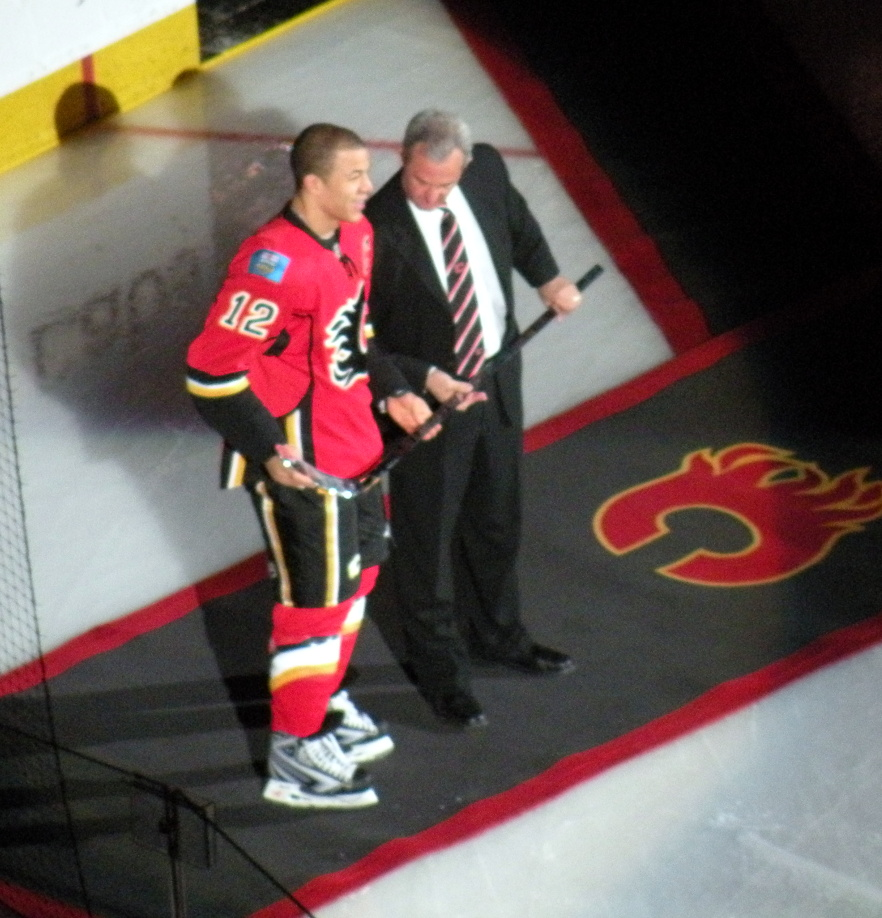
Darryl Sutter presents Jarome Iginla with a silver stick in honour of his becoming the Flames all-time scoring leader.

Rookie Brett Sutter became the 8th member of the Sutter family to play in the NHL on December 23 when he made his debut against the Anaheim Ducks. The son of general manager Darryl Sutter, Brett scored a goal in his first game to help the Flames enter the Christmas break with a one-point lead on the Vancouver Canucks in the Northwest Division. Calgary expanded on that lead to five points after both Jarome Iginla and Mike Cammalleri posted career-high five-point nights in a 6–4 win over the Edmonton Oilers on New Year's Eve.

The Flames lost one of their original owners early in the new year as Daryl "Doc" Seaman died January 11, 2009. Seaman had been one of the original group of six owners who brought the team to Calgary in 1980 and remained with the ownership group until his death.

Iginla reached numerous personal milestones throughout the season. He recorded his 400th career assist in an early season game against Colorado. He represented the Flames at the 2009 All-Star Game, his fifth appearance, and recorded his first All-Star goal. On March 1, Iginla surpassed Theoren Fleury's franchise record of 830 career points as part of another five-point night against Tampa Bay, a game where he also scored his 400th career goal.

Injuries became a serious concern for the Flames entering March, as Mark Giordano (shoulder surgery), Rene Bourque (high ankle sprain), Todd Bertuzzi (knee surgery), Brandon Prust (concussion) and Daymond Langkow (hand) were all on injured reserve to start the month. Looking to improve the team, Sutter completed two significant deals at the March 4 trade deadline, acquiring defenceman Jordan Leopold from the Colorado Avalanche and centre Olli Jokinen from the Phoenix Coyotes. The deals paid immediate dividends, as Jokinen scored twice and Leopold once in a 5–1 victory the next night against the Philadelphia Flyers allowing the Northwest Division leading Flames to move ten points ahead of the second place Canucks.

The Tim Hortons Brier took over the Saddledome in early March, forcing the Flames on a season long, seven-game road trip, during which the team struggled to a 3–4 record that saw them suffer lopsided losses to the Carolina Hurricanes, Atlanta Thrashers and Toronto Maple Leafs; the Flames surrendered 27 goals in the final five games of the trip. Consequently, the Flames saw their lead for the division shrink to five points barely a week after the victory in Philadelphia. Calgary's lead fell to one point following consecutive shutout losses to the Pittsburgh Penguins and Columbus Blue Jackets in late March. The Flames and Canucks ended the season in a battle for top spot, as both teams repeatedly took over the division lead heading into the final week of play.

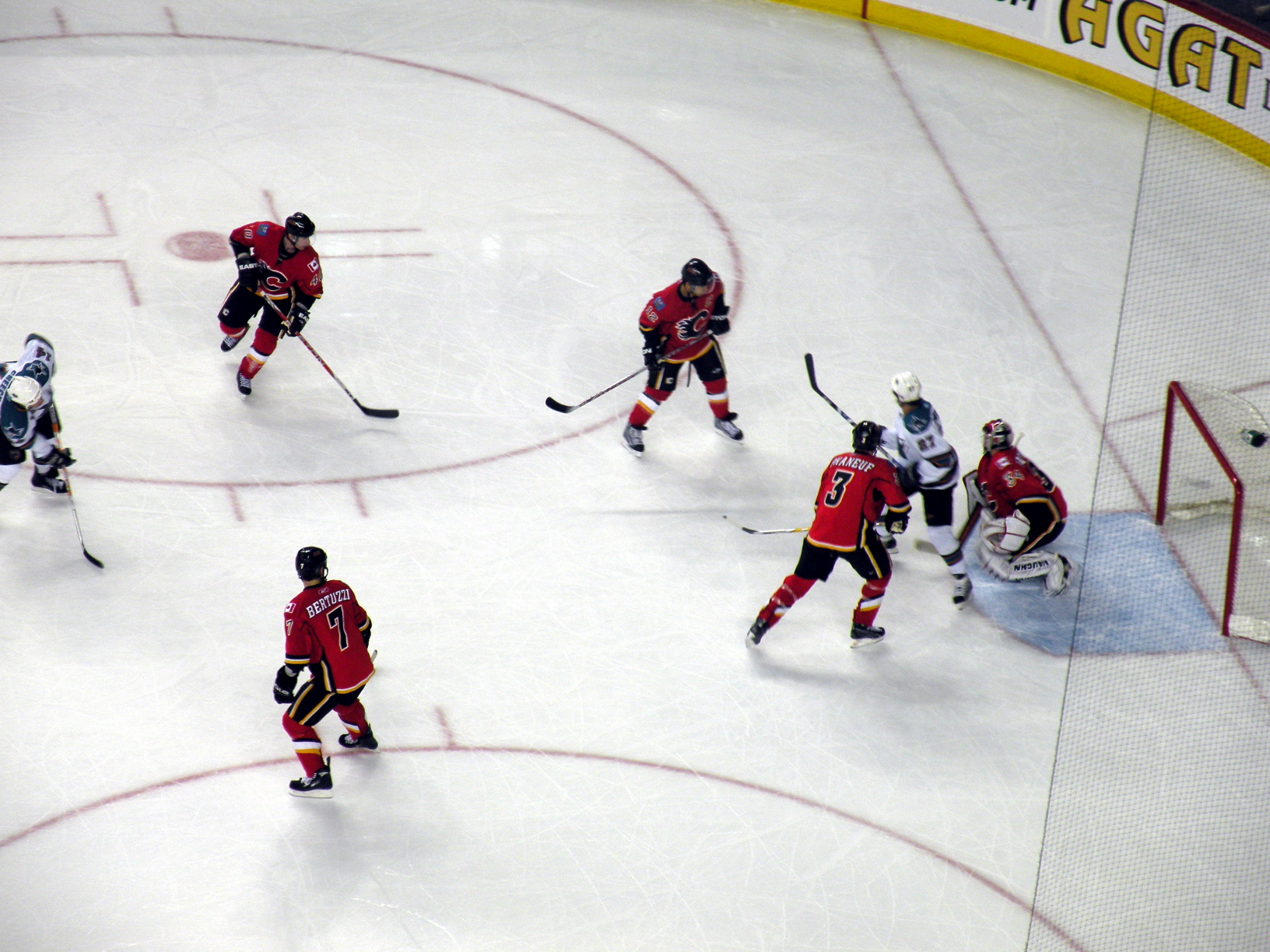
Flames in action against San Jose

Injuries continued to batter the Flames towards the end of the regular season, as defencemen Robyn Regehr (MCL) and Cory Sarich (broken foot) were both lost in early April. The injuries led the Flames to call up rookies Matt Pelech and John Negrin, the latter of whom had just finished his junior season and had never played a professional game, to make their NHL debuts against the Minnesota Wild. The Flames were forced to play their final games of the regular season with as few as 15 skaters, below the normal 18, as the team lacked available salary cap space to call up replacements without sending other players down to their minor league affiliate in Quad City.

Calgary's late season collapse ended with Vancouver winning the Northwest Division in the final weekend of the regular season following consecutive victories by the Canucks over the Flames, Los Angeles Kings and Colorado Avalanche while the Flames lost against Vancouver and Edmonton. As a result, the Flames finished the regular season second in the Northwest Division, and fifth in the Western Conference.

The Flames finished the regular season having allowed the most shorthanded goals in the League, with 15.

=== Divisional standings ===
Northwest Division
		GP	W	L	OTL	GF	GA	Pts
**1**	**y – Vancouver Canucks**	**82**	**45**	**27**	**10**	**246**	**220**	**100**
**2**	**Calgary Flames**	**82**	**46**	**30**	**6**	**254**	**248**	**98**
3	Minnesota Wild	82	40	33	9	219	200	**89**
4	Edmonton Oilers	82	38	35	9	234	248	**85**
5	Colorado Avalanche	82	32	45	5	199	257	**69**

=== Conference standings ===
Western Conference
R		Div	GP	W	L	OTL	GF	GA	Pts
**1**	**p – San Jose Sharks**	**PA**	**82**	**53**	**18**	**11**	**257**	**204**	117
**2**	**y – Detroit Red Wings**	**CE**	**82**	**51**	**21**	**10**	**295**	**244**	112
**3**	**y – Vancouver Canucks**	**NW**	**82**	**45**	**27**	**10**	**246**	**220**	100
**4**	**Chicago Blackhawks**	**CE**	**82**	**46**	**24**	**12**	**264**	**216**	104
**5**	**Calgary Flames**	**NW**	**82**	**46**	**30**	**6**	**254**	**248**	98
**6**	**St. Louis Blues**	**CE**	**82**	**41**	**31**	**10**	**233**	**233**	92
**7**	**Columbus Blue Jackets**	**CE**	**82**	**41**	**31**	**10**	**226**	**230**	92
**8**	**Anaheim Ducks**	**PA**	**82**	**42**	**33**	**7**	**245**	**238**	91
8.5
9	Minnesota Wild	NW	82	40	33	9	219	200	89
10	Nashville Predators	CE	82	40	34	8	213	233	88
11	Edmonton Oilers	NW	82	38	35	9	234	248	85
12	Dallas Stars	PA	82	36	35	11	230	257	83
13	Phoenix Coyotes	PA	82	36	39	7	208	252	79
14	Los Angeles Kings	PA	82	34	37	11	207	234	79
15	Colorado Avalanche	NW	82	32	45	5	199	257	69

bold – qualified for playoffs, y – division winner, p – Presidents' Trophy winner
CE – Central Division, NW – Northwest Division, PA – Pacific Division

== Schedule and results ==
2008–09 Game log

October: 6–3–1 (Home: 4–1–1; Road: 2–2–0)
#	Date	Visitor	Score	Home	OT	Decision	Attendance	Record	Pts
1	October 9	Calgary	0 – 6	Vancouver		Kiprusoff	18,630	0–1–0	0
2	October 11	Vancouver	5 – 4	Calgary	OT	Kiprusoff	19,289	0–1–1	1
3	October 14	Colorado	4 – 5	Calgary		Kiprusoff	19,289	1–1–1	3
4	October 17	Edmonton	4 – 3	Calgary		Kiprusoff	19,289	1–2–1	3
5	October 18	Calgary	2 – 3	Edmonton		Kiprusoff	16,839	1–3–1	3
6	October 21	Washington	1 – 2	Calgary		Kiprusoff	19,289	2–3–1	5
7	October 23	Calgary	5 – 3	Nashville		Kiprusoff	12,042	3–3–1	7
8	October 25	Calgary	4 – 1	Phoenix		Kiprusoff	15,038	4–3–1	9
9	October 28	Colorado	0 – 3	Calgary		Kiprusoff	19,289	5–3–1	11
10	October 30	Boston	2 – 3	Calgary		Kiprusoff	19,289	6–3–1	13

November: 8–6–0 (Home: 5–2–0; Road: 3–4–0)
#	Date	Visitor	Score	Home	OT	Decision	Attendance	Record	Pts
11	November 1	Calgary	3 – 2	Los Angeles		Kiprusoff	16,279	7–3–1	15
12	November 2	Calgary	2 – 3	Anaheim		Kiprusoff	16,965	7–4–1	15
13	November 4	Phoenix	4 – 2	Calgary		Kiprusoff	19,289	7–5–1	15
14	November 6	Nashville	6 – 7	Calgary		Kiprusoff	19,289	8–5–1	17
15	November 8	Calgary	1 – 3	Columbus		McElhinney	14,088	8–6–1	17
16	November 9	Calgary	1 – 6	Chicago		Kiprusoff	21,169	8–7–1	17
17	November 11	Toronto	3 – 4	Calgary		Kiprusoff	19,289	9–7–1	19
18	November 13	Calgary	1 – 6	San Jose		McElhinney	17,496	9–8–1	19
19	November 18	Colorado	1 – 4	Calgary		Kiprusoff	19,289	10–8–1	21
20	November 20	Calgary	1 – 0	Colorado		Kiprusoff	14,536	11–8–1	23
21	November 22	Detroit	5 – 2	Calgary		Kiprusoff	19,289	11–9–1	23
22	November 25	Los Angeles	2 – 6	Calgary		Kiprusoff	19,289	12–9–1	25
23	November 27	Calgary	4 – 3	Vancouver		Kiprusoff	18,630	13–9–1	27
24	November 29	Vancouver	1 – 3	Calgary		Kiprusoff	19,289	14–9–1	29

December: 8–2–3 (Home: 4–1–2; Road: 4–1–1)
#	Date	Visitor	Score	Home	OT	Decision	Attendance	Record	Pts
25	December 2	Dallas	3 – 1	Calgary		Kiprusoff	19,289	14–10–1	29
26	December 5	Calgary	4 – 3	St. Louis	OT	Kiprusoff	17,365	15–10–1	31
27	December 7	Calgary	3 – 0	NY Rangers		Kiprusoff	18,200	16–10–1	33
28	December 9	Calgary	1 – 4	Montreal		Kiprusoff	21,273	16–11–1	33
29	December 10	Calgary	3 – 4	Detroit	OT	McElhinney	19,335	16–11–2	34
30	December 12	Florida	3 – 2	Calgary	SO	Kiprusoff	19,289	16–11–3	35
31	December 16	Calgary	6 – 3	St. Louis		Kiprusoff	16,426	17–11–3	37
32	December 17	Calgary	3 – 2	Minnesota	OT	Kiprusoff	18,568	18–11–3	39
33	December 19	Chicago	3 – 2	Calgary	OT	Kiprusoff	19,289	18–11–4	40
34	December 23	Anaheim	3 – 4	Calgary		Kiprusoff	19,289	19–11–4	42
35	December 27	Ottawa	3 – 6	Calgary		Kiprusoff	19,289	20–11–4	44
36	December 29	Minnesota	1 – 2	Calgary		Kiprusoff	19,289	21–11–4	46
37	December 31	Edmonton	4 – 6	Calgary		Kiprusoff	19,289	22–11–4	48

January: 7–3–0 (Home: 5–1–0; Road: 2–2–0)
#	Date	Visitor	Score	Home	OT	Decision	Attendance	Record	Pts
38	January 3	Calgary	3 – 2	Nashville		Kiprusoff	14,321	23–11–4	50
39	January 4	Calgary	2 – 5	Chicago		Kiprusoff	22,146	23–12–4	50
40	January 6	San Jose	2 – 5	Calgary		Kiprusoff	19,289	24–12–4	52
41	January 8	NY Islanders	2 – 5	Calgary		Kiprusoff	19,289	25–12–4	54
42	January 13	St. Louis	1 – 3	Calgary		Kiprusoff	19,289	26–12–4	56
43	January 15	Calgary	3 – 2	San Jose		Kiprusoff	17,496	27–12–4	58
44	January 17	Phoenix	4 – 3	Calgary		Kiprusoff	19,289	27–13–4	58
45	January 18	Calgary	2 – 6	Colorado		McElhinney	16,113	27–14–4	58
46	January 21	Columbus	4 – 5	Calgary	SO	Kiprusoff	19,289	28–14–4	60
47	January 28	Buffalo	2 – 5	Calgary		Kiprusoff	19,289	29–14–4	62
48	January 30	Nashville	1 – 3	Calgary		Kiprusoff	19,289	30–14–4	64

February: 7–4–2 (Home: 3–2–1; Road: 4–2–1)
#	Date	Visitor	Score	Home	OT	Decision	Attendance	Record	Pts
49	February 2	Calgary	3 – 4	Colorado		Kiprusoff	13,409	30–15–4	64
50	February 3	Calgary	1 – 3	Dallas		Kiprusoff	16,395	30–16–4	64
51	February 5	Chicago	5 – 2	Calgary		Kiprusoff	19,289	30–17–4	64
52	February 7	Anaheim	2 – 1	Calgary		McElhinney	19,289	30–18–4	64
53	February 9	Montreal	2 – 6	Calgary		Kiprusoff	19,289	31–18–4	66
54	February 11	Calgary	2 – 3	Anaheim	OT	Kiprusoff	17,270	31–18–5	67
55	February 12	Calgary	2 – 0	Los Angeles		Kiprusoff	17,286	32–18–5	69
56	February 14	Calgary	7 – 5	Phoenix		Kiprusoff	16,981	33–18–5	71
57	February 17	Vancouver	4 – 3	Calgary	SO	Kiprusoff	19,289	33–18–6	72
58	February 19	Calgary	3 – 2	Minnesota	OT	Kiprusoff	18,568	34–18–6	74
59	February 21	Calgary	3 – 2	Edmonton	SO	Kiprusoff	16,839	35–18–6	76
60	February 24	Columbus	1 – 4	Calgary		Kiprusoff	19,289	36–18–6	78
61	February 27	Minnesota	1 – 4	Calgary		Kiprusoff	19,289	37–18–6	80

March: 6–9–0 (Home: 3–3–0; Road: 3–6–0)
#	Date	Visitor	Score	Home	OT	Decision	Attendance	Record	Pts
62	March 1	Tampa Bay	8 – 6	Calgary		Kiprusoff	19,289	37–19–6	80
63	March 3	Calgary	6 – 3	Ottawa		Kiprusoff	18,865	38–19–6	82
64	March 5	Calgary	5 – 1	Philadelphia		Kiprusoff	19,513	39–19–6	84
65	March 6	Calgary	1 – 6	Carolina		McElhinney	18,108	39–20–6	84
66	March 8	Calgary	2 – 5	Atlanta		Kiprusoff	13,469	39–21–6	84
67	March 10	Calgary	2 – 3	New Jersey		Kiprusoff	14,598	39–22–6	84
68	March 12	Calgary	6 – 5	Detroit	SO	Kiprusoff	20,066	40–22–6	86
69	March 14	Calgary	6 – 8	Toronto		McElhinney	19,356	40–23–6	86
70	March 18	Dallas	1 – 2	Calgary		Kiprusoff	19,289	41–23–6	88
71	March 20	St. Louis	3 – 2	Calgary		Kiprusoff	19,289	41–24–6	88
72	March 23	Detroit	3 – 5	Calgary		Kiprusoff	19,289	42–24–6	90
73	March 25	Calgary	0 – 2	Pittsburgh		Kiprusoff	17,083	42–25–6	90
74	March 26	Calgary	0 – 5	Columbus		Kiprusoff	16,327	42–26–6	90
75	March 28	Minnesota	2 – 3	Calgary		Kiprusoff	19,289	43–26–6	92
76	March 30	San Jose	2 – 1	Calgary		Kiprusoff	19,289	43–27–6	92

April: 3–3–0 (Home: 2–0–0; Road: 1–3–0)
#	Date	Visitor	Score	Home	OT	Decision	Attendance	Record	Pts
77	April 2	Calgary	2 – 1	Dallas		Kiprusoff	17,106	44–27–6	94
78	April 3	Calgary	0 – 4	Minnesota		Kiprusoff	18,568	44–28–6	94
79	April 6	Los Angeles	1 – 4	Calgary		Kiprusoff	19,289	45–28–6	96
80	April 7	Calgary	1 – 4	Vancouver		Kiprusoff	18,630	45–29–6	96
81	April 10	Calgary	1 – 5	Edmonton		Kiprusoff	16,839	45–30–6	96
82	April 11	Edmonton	1 – 4	Calgary		McElhinney	19,289	46–30–6	98

Legend: Win (2 points) Loss (0 points) Overtime/shootout loss (1 point)

== Playoffs ==
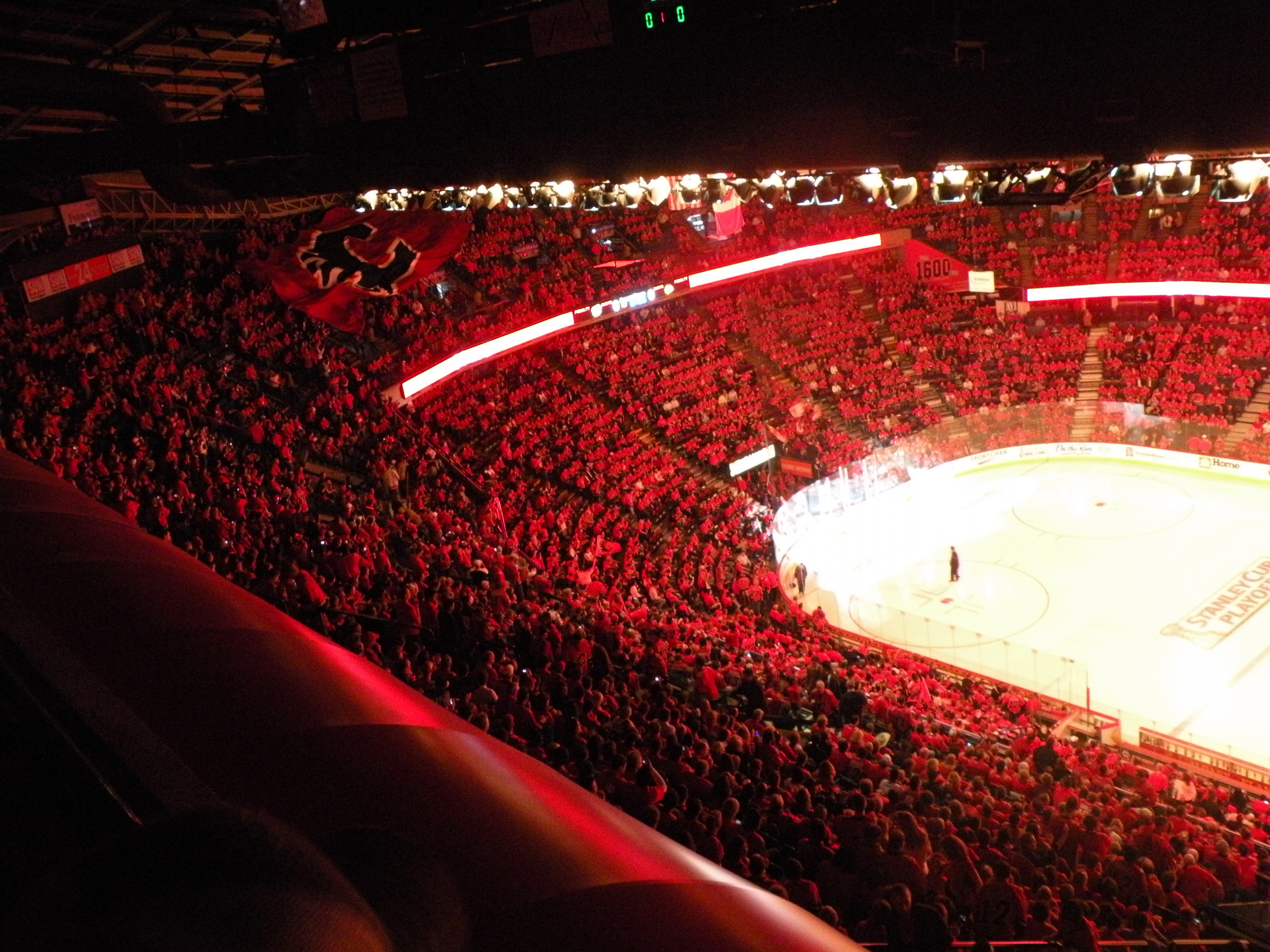
The C of Red prior to game 3 against Chicago

The Flames qualified for the 2009 Stanley Cup Playoffs as the fifth seed in the Western Conference, and faced the fourth seeded Chicago Blackhawks in the first round. The two teams met four times in the regular season, all of which resulted in Chicago victories. It was the fourth time the two teams met in the playoffs. Calgary defeated Chicago in 1981 and 1989, while Chicago prevailed in 1996.

The Western Conference quarter-final series opened in Chicago; the first Blackhawk playoff games in seven years. The Flames dropped the first two games, each by identical 3–2 scores. In both games, they played strong to start the games, earning 1–0 and 2–0 leads respectively before conceding the advantage. The Flames lost the first game after just 12 seconds of overtime. An angry Flames team returned to Calgary for games three and four, promising to improve their play. They won game three, 4–2, on the strength of Kiprusoff's 36-save performance in goal. The first three games of the series were physically intense and occasionally violent, prompting the league to warn both teams to tone down both the verbal attacks they were exchanging as well as to remain within the rules when engaging in scrums after the play ended. TSN commentator Pierre McGuire, stationed between each team's benches, insisted that Iginla in particular had taken more verbal abuse than he had ever seen. A "fired up" Iginla responded with two goals and an assist in game four as the Flames tied the series with a 6–4 victory.

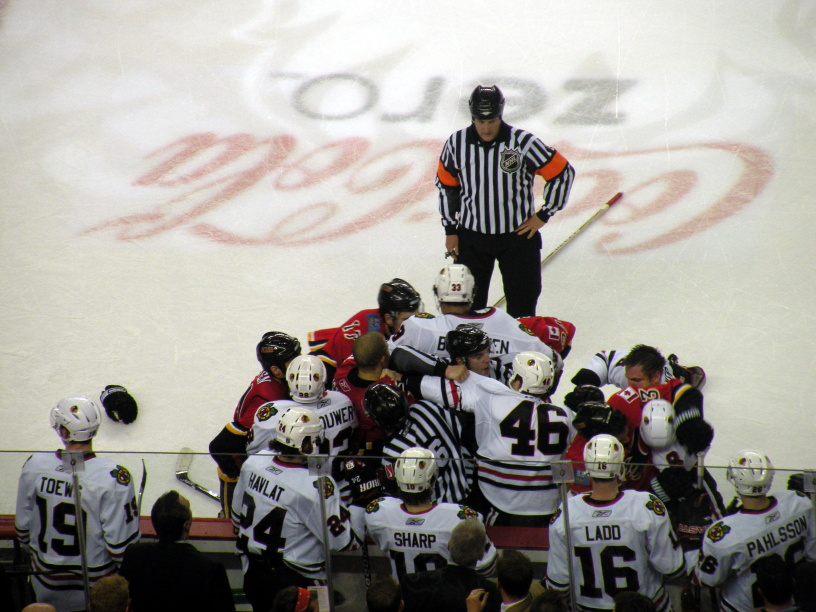
The series against the Hawks was a physical affair

Iginla and the Flames were unable to maintain their momentum when the series returned to Chicago for game five. Iginla recorded only one shot, while Miikka Kiprusoff was pulled early in the second period as the Blackhawks easily won the game 5–1. Forward Andre Roy missed the fifth game after being suspended and fined $2,500 after he initiated contact with Chicago's Aaron Johnson during the warm-up prior to game four. The Flames' season came to an end in the sixth game as Nikolai Khabibulin's 43-save performance led the Hawks to a 4–1 win over the Flames. It was the first time Chicago had won a playoff series since they last defeated the Flames in 1996.

The Flames revealed the true extent of their injury situation following the loss, noting that Dion Phaneuf, who missed game six, was playing with broken ribs, while Cory Sarich was playing on a fractured ankle. With Rhett Warrener, Mark Giordano and Robyn Regehr all sidelined for the entire series, the Flames had five defencemen either out or playing hurt the entire series. In addition, Craig Conroy, Rene Bourque and Daymond Langkow were all playing despite various ailments. In spite of the Flames' injury situation, the team's fourth consecutive first round defeat led to new demands that head coach Mike Keenan be replaced as the team's head coach. Keenan was fired on May 22.

2009 Stanley Cup Playoffs

Western Conference quarter-final vs. Chicago (4)
Game	Date	Visitor	Score	Home	OT	Decision	Attendance	Series
1	April 16	Calgary	2 – 3	Chicago	OT	Kiprusoff	22,478	Chicago leads 1 – 0
2	April 18	Calgary	2 – 3	Chicago		Kiprusoff	22,514	Chicago leads 2 – 0
3	April 20	Chicago	2 – 4	Calgary		Kiprusoff	19,289	Chicago leads 2 – 1
4	April 22	Chicago	4 – 6	Calgary		Kiprusoff	19,289	Series tied 2 – 2
5	April 25	Calgary	1 – 5	Chicago		Kiprusoff	22,563	Chicago leads 3 – 2
6	April 27	Chicago	4 – 1	Calgary		Kiprusoff	19,289	Chicago wins series 4 – 2
Legend: Win Loss

== Player statistics ==
=== Skaters ===
Note: Pos = Position; GP = Games played; G = Goals; A = Assists; Pts = Points; PIM = Penalty minutes; +/- = Plus/minus; PPG = Power-play goals; SHG = Short-handed goals; GWG = Game-winning goals

Regular season

Player	GP	G	A	Pts	+/−	PIM
Jarome Iginla	82	35	54	89	-2	37
Mike Cammalleri	81	39	43	82	-2	44
Daymond Langkow	73	21	28	49	+1	20
Craig Conroy	82	12	36	48	+20	28
Dion Phaneuf	80	11	36	47	-11	100
Todd Bertuzzi	66	15	29	44	-13	74
Curtis Glencross	74	13	27	40	+14	42
Rene Bourque	58	21	19	40	+18	70
David Moss	81	20	19	39	-5	22
Adrian Aucoin	81	10	24	34	-8	46
Matthew Lombardi^{‡}	50	9	21	30	+11	30
Dustin Boyd	71	11	11	22	-11	10
Cory Sarich	76	2	18	20	+12	112
Mark Giordano	58	2	17	19	+2	59
Jamie Lundmark	27	8	8	16	+2	17
Olli Jokinen^{†}	19	8	7	15	-7	18
Eric Nystrom	76	5	5	10	-7	89
Adam Pardy	60	1	9	10	+3	69
Robyn Regehr	75	0	8	8	+10	73
Jim Vandermeer	45	1	6	7	+1	108
Wayne Primeau	24	0	4	4	-3	14
Jordan Leopold^{†}	19	1	3	4	-5	6
Andre Roy	44	3	0	3	-1	83
Matt Pelech	5	0	3	3	+1	9
Brandon Prust^{‡}	25	1	1	2	-4	79
David Van der Gulik	6	0	2	2	-1	0
Warren Peters	16	1	0	1	-2	12
Brett Sutter	4	1	0	1	-2	2
John Negrin	3	0	1	1	-2	2
Kris Chucko	2	0	0	0	0	2
Kyle Greentree	2	0	0	0	-1	0
Mikael Backlund	1	0	0	0	0	0

Playoffs

Player	GP	G	A	Pts	+/−	PIM
Olli Jokinen	6	2	3	5	-1	4
Jarome Iginla	6	3	1	4	-4	0
Eric Nystrom	6	2	2	4	+1	0
Adrian Aucoin	6	2	1	3	-2	2
Daymond Langkow	6	0	3	3	+4	2
Mike Cammalleri	6	1	2	3	+1	2
Dion Phaneuf	5	0	3	3	+2	4
Curtis Glencross	6	0	3	3	-1	12
David Moss	6	3	0	3	0	0
Todd Bertuzzi	6	1	1	2	+4	8
Adam Pardy	6	0	2	2	-2	5
Craig Conroy	6	0	1	1	-2	0
Cory Sarich	5	0	1	1	+3	4
Jim Vandermeer	6	0	1	1	-1	4
Jordan Leopold	6	0	1	1	+2	8
Rene Bourque	5	1	0	1	-2	22
Dustin Boyd	5	1	0	1	-2	0
Anders Eriksson	2	0	0	0	-1	0
Andre Roy	2	0	0	0	-1	0
Jamie Lundmark	2	0	0	0	-2	0
Warren Peters	4	0	0	0	+2	0

=== Goaltenders ===
Note: Pos = Position;GP = Games played; Min, TOI = Minutes played; W = Wins; L = Losses; T,T/OT = Ties; OTL = Overtime losses; GA = Goals-against; GAA = Goals-against average; SO = Shutouts; SA = Shots against; SV = Shots saved; SV% = Save percentage;

Regular season

Player	GP	Min	W	L	OTL	GA	GAA	SA	SV	Sv%	SO
Miikka Kiprusoff	76	4417	45	24	5	209	2.84	2155	1946	.903	4
Curtis McElhinney	14	517	1	6	1	31	3.59	280	249	.889	0

Playoffs

Player	GP	Min	W	L	GA	GAA	SA	SV	Sv%	SO
Miikka Kiprusoff	6	323	2	4	19	3.52	164	145	.884	0
Curtis McElhinney	1	33	0	0	1	1.78	10	9	.900	0

^{†}Denotes player spent time with another team before joining Flames. Stats reflect time with the Flames only.
^{‡}Traded mid-season
Bold/italics denotes franchise record

== Awards and records ==
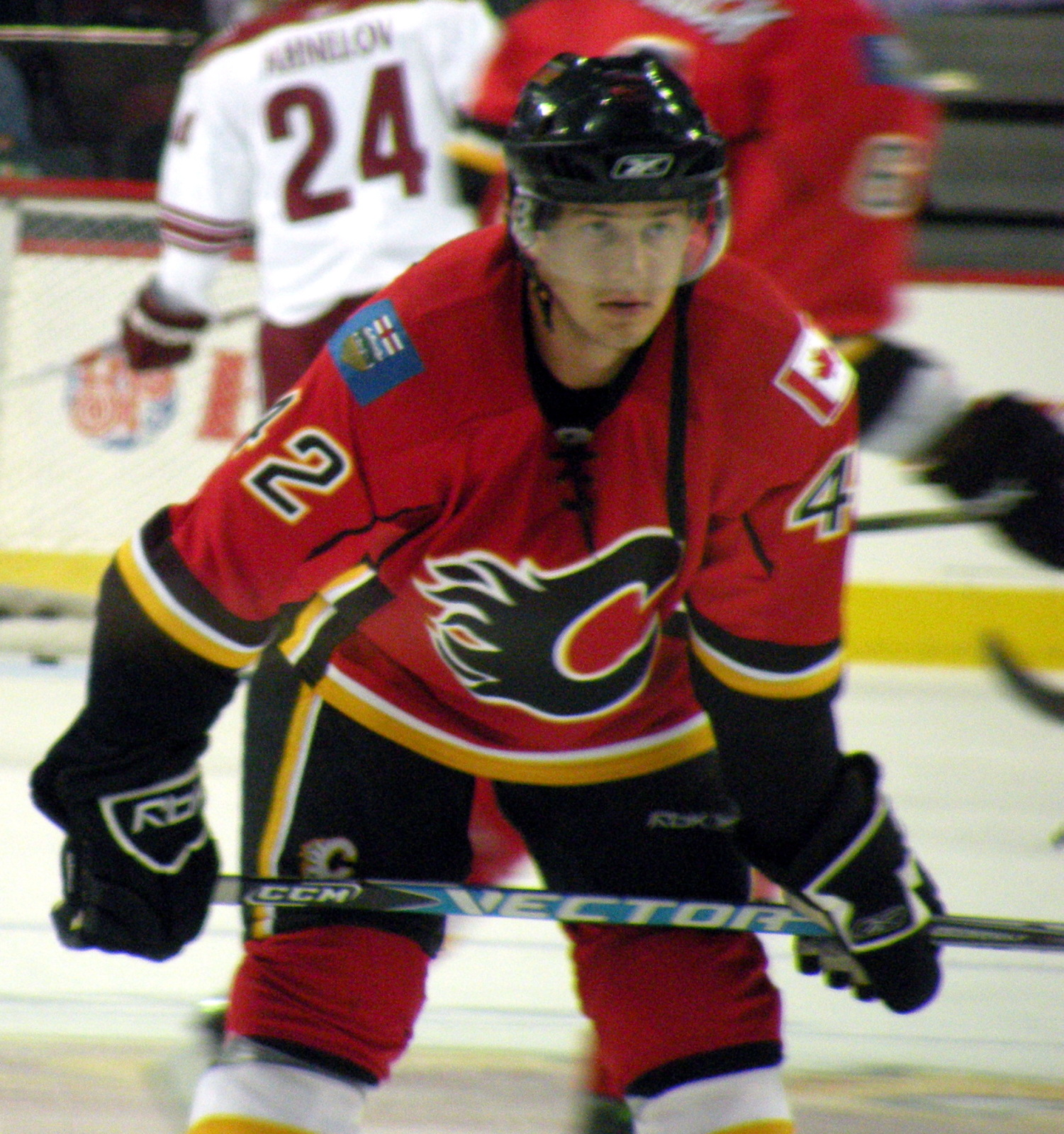
Brett Sutter became the eighth member of the Sutter family to play in the NHL when he made his debut on December 23.

Several players made their NHL debuts with the Flames in 2008–09. Adam Pardy began the season with the Flames, while Warren Peters, Brett Sutter, David Van der Gulik, Kris Chucko, John Negrin and Matt Pelech were each recalled from the Quad City Flames during the season. The latter two made their debuts on the same night, April 3, after the Flames lost three defencemen in previous games. 2007 first round pick Mikael Backlund played one game with the Flames after leaving his Swedish team before being sent to the Kelowna Rockets of the Western Hockey League.

NHL awards
Player	Award
Jarome Iginla	First Star of the Week (October 20–26)
Jarome Iginla	Second Star of the Week (Feb. 23–Mar. 1)
Olli Jokinen	Second Star of the Week (March 9–15)
Jarome Iginla	First team All-Star
Jarome Iginla	Mark Messier Leadership Award
Team awards
Miikka Kiprusoff	Molson Cup
David Moss	Ralph T. Scurfield Humanitarian Award
Craig Conroy	J. R. "Bud" McCaig Award

=== Records and milestones ===
Player	Milestone	Reached
Adam Pardy	1st NHL game	October 9, 2008
Brandon Prust	1st NHL point	October 11, 2008
Brandon Prust	1st NHL goal	October 25, 2008
Adrian Aucoin	100th NHL goal	November 1, 2008
Jarome Iginla	400th NHL assist	November 20, 2008
Cory Sarich	100th NHL point	November 25, 2008
Warren Peters	1st NHL game	December 7, 2008
Adam Pardy	1st NHL assist 1st NHL point	December 12, 2008
Jarome Iginla	800th NHL point	December 19, 2008
Brett Sutter	1st NHL game 1st NHL goal 1st NHL point	December 23, 2008
Craig Conroy	500th NHL point	January 3, 2009
Mikael Backlund	1st NHL game	January 9, 2009
Adam Pardy	1st NHL goal	January 9, 2009
David Van der Gulik	1st NHL game	February 27, 2009
Jarome Iginla	831st NHL Point (franchise record); 400th NHL Goal	March 1, 2009
Warren Peters	1st NHL goal 1st NHL point	March 3, 2009
David Van der Gulik	1st NHL point	March 3, 2009
Kris Chucko	1st NHL game	March 5, 2009
Matt Pelech	1st NHL game	April 3, 2009
John Negrin	1st NHL game	April 3, 2009
Matt Pelech	1st NHL point	April 6, 2009
John Negrin	1st NHL point	April 11, 2009
Curtis McElhinney	1st NHL win	April 11, 2009

== Transactions ==
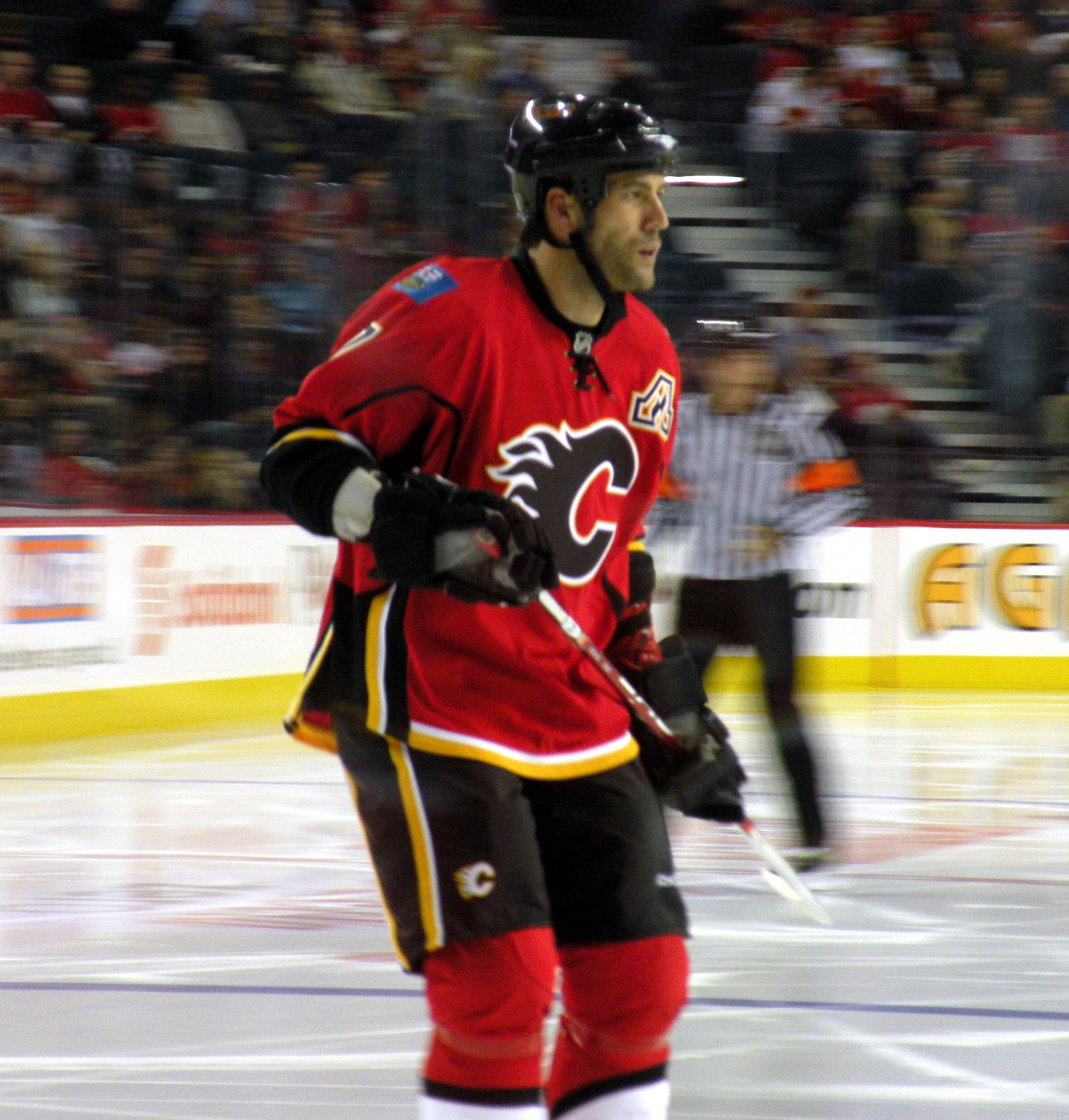
Todd Bertuzzi was a controversial acquisition by the Flames.

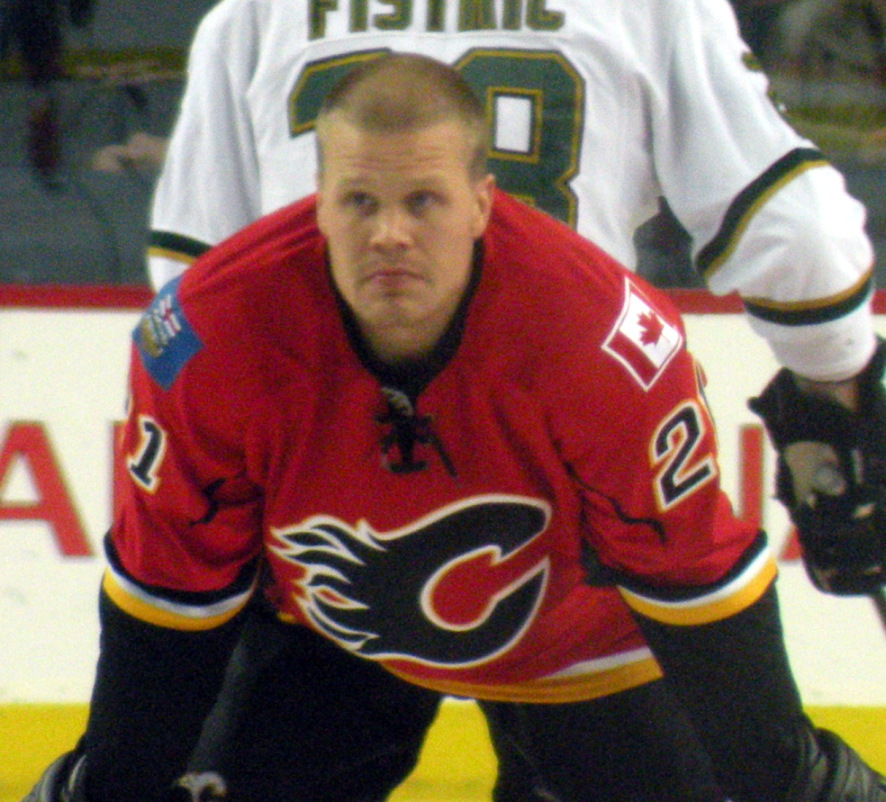
The acquisition of Olli Jokinen was considered to be one of the most significant moves at the NHL trade deadline.

The Flames made two trades at the 2008 NHL entry draft, sending forward Alex Tanguay to Montreal and acquiring Mike Cammalleri from Los Angeles in two separate deals. Calgary sent the 17th overall selection in the draft to the Kings, and received the 25th overall pick from the Canadiens as part of the trades.

Todd Bertuzzi was signed by the Flames as a free agent on July 8, 2009. The controversial forward best known for his attack on Steve Moore in 2003–04, had previously been extremely unpopular with Flames fans. Bertuzzi, who had previously been booed by Calgary fans every time he touched the puck was greeted with loud cheers when he was introduced before the Flames' first exhibition game of the season.

The trade deadline on March 4 saw the Flames emerge as one of the most active teams on the day, completing three trades. Calgary acquired defenceman Jordan Leopold from Colorado for Lawrence Nycholat, who was picked up on waivers from Vancouver one day prior and never played with Calgary, minor leaguer Ryan Wilson and a draft pick. general manager Darryl Sutter then completed what was considered the biggest deal of the day, acquiring Olli Jokinen and a third round pick from the Coyotes in exchange for Matthew Lombardi, Brandon Prust and a first round pick. The Flames then ended the day with a minor move, sending minor-league goaltender Kevin Lalande to Columbus for a fourth round pick.

=== Trades ===
June 20, 2008	To Calgary Flames Mike Cammalleri; 2nd-round pick in 2008 – Mitch Wahl	To Los Angeles Kings 1st-round pick in 2008 – Jake Gardiner; 2nd-round pick in 2009 – Brian Dumoulin
June 20, 2008	To Calgary Flames 1st-round pick in 2008 – Greg Nemisz; 2nd-round pick in 2009 – Stefan Elliott	To Montreal Canadiens Alex Tanguay; 5th-round pick in 2008 – Maxim Trunev
June 30, 2008	To Calgary Flames Kyle Greentree	To Philadelphia Flyers Tim Ramholt
July 1, 2008	To Calgary Flames Rene Bourque	To Chicago Blackhawks Conditional 2nd-round pick in 2008 or 2009 – Bradley Ross
March 4, 2009	To Calgary Flames Jordan Leopold	To Colorado Avalanche Lawrence Nycholat; Ryan Wilson; 2nd-round pick in 2009 – Stefan Elliott
March 4, 2009	To Calgary Flames Olli Jokinen; 3rd-round pick in 2009 – Josh Birkholz	To Phoenix Coyotes Matthew Lombardi; Brandon Prust; 1st-round pick in 2009 or 2010 – Brandon Gormley
March 4, 2009	To Calgary Flames 4th-round pick in 2009 – Garrett Wilson	To Columbus Blue Jackets Kevin Lalande

=== Additions and subtractions ===
Additions
Player	Former team	Via
Mark Giordano	Dynamo Moscow	Free agency
Curtis Glencross	Edmonton Oilers	Free agency
Todd Bertuzzi	Anaheim Ducks	Free agency
Jamie Lundmark	Dynamo Moscow	Free agency
Andre Roy	Tampa Bay Lightning	Free agency
Lawrence Nycholat	Vancouver Canucks	Waivers

Subtractions
Player	New team	Via
Eric Godard	Pittsburgh Penguins	Free agency
Curtis Joseph	Toronto Maple Leafs	Free agency
Kristian Huselius	Columbus Blue Jackets	Free agency
Owen Nolan	Minnesota Wild	Free agency
David Hale	Phoenix Coyotes	Free agency

== Draft picks ==
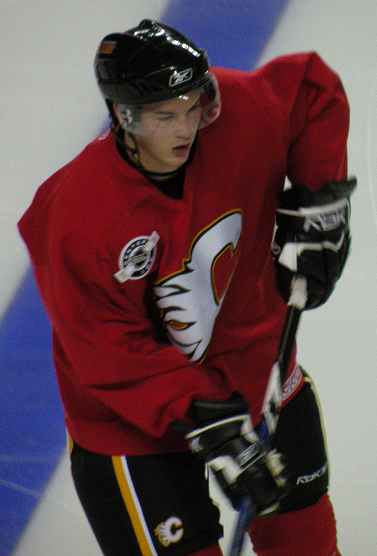
Greg Nemisz, shown at Calgary's 2008 rookie camp, was the team's top pick, 25th overall.

The Flames entered the 2008 NHL entry draft in Ottawa with the 17th overall selection. They dealt that pick to Los Angeles, and acquired the 25th overall selection from Montreal. With that pick, the Flames selected centre Greg Nemisz from the Ontario Hockey League's Windsor Spitfires. Listed at six-foot-three and 197 pounds, Nemisz is described as being a potential power forward who is not afraid of working hard. Calgary drafted six other players, led by second-round selection Mitch Wahl, whom the Flames project to be a potential top-six forward.

Rnd	Pick	Player	Nationality	Position	Team (league)	NHL statistics				
Rnd	Pick	Player	Nationality	Position	Team (league)	GP	G	A	Pts	PIM
1	25	Greg Nemisz	Canada	C/RW	Windsor Spitfires (OHL)	15	0	1	1	0
2	48	Mitch Wahl	United States	C	Spokane Chiefs (WHL)					
3	78	Lance Bouma^{†}	Canada	C/LW	Vancouver Giants (WHL)	199	22	31	53	108
4	108	Nick Larson	United States	LW	Waterloo Black Hawks (USHL)					
4	114	T. J. Brodie^{†}	Canada	D	Saginaw Spirit (OHL)	266	19	81	100	74
6	168	Ryley Grantham	Canada	C	Moose Jaw Warriors (WHL)					
7	198	Alexander Deilert	Sweden	D	Djurgårdens IF Jr. (J20 SuperElit)					

Statistics are updated to the end of the 2014–15 NHL season. ^{†} denotes player was on an NHL roster in 2014–15.

== Farm teams ==
=== Quad City Flames ===
The Quad City Flames entered their second season in the American Hockey League (AHL) in 2008–09. The team was dogged throughout the season by rumours that the franchise would relocate to Abbotsford, British Columbia in 2009–10. The owners in Quad Cities acknowledged that the Flames had been considering a change, but expected the franchise would remain in Moline, Illinois. Despite these assurances, Calgary confirmed on March 11 that they had reached an agreement with the owners in Quad Cities to end their affiliation agreement after only two seasons, and announced their intent to move into Abbotsford. The proposed relocation was approved by the AHL board of governors on April 29, 2009.

On the ice, Quad City finished with a 36–31–6–7 record, fifth in the West Division, and one point shy of making the playoffs. Quad City played its final game on April 11, 2009, with a 5–3 win over the Iowa Chops. Kyle Greentree led the team in scoring, with a franchise high 76 points.

=== Las Vegas Wranglers ===
The Las Vegas Wranglers remained Calgary's ECHL affiliate for the sixth season, where they finished 2nd in the Pacific division with a 34–31–2–6 record. In the Kelly Cup playoffs, the Wranlgers defeated the Bakersfield Condors and Stockton Thunder in seven games each to reach the National Conference finals. The season came to an end against the Alaska Aces, who eliminated Las Vegas in four games.

As part of their affiliation agreement with Las Vegas, the Flames assigned four players to the Wranglers to begin the season: Gord Baldwin, Hugo Carpentier, Kevin Lalande and Dan Spang. Lalande led the team amongst goaltenders with 21 games played, recording a record of 9–8–0–3, while Glen Fisher led the team with 11 wins. Dan Riedel, acquired from the Dayton Bombers during the season led the team with 23 goals and 57 points.
