= Adam Pelech =

Canadian ice hockey player (born 1994)

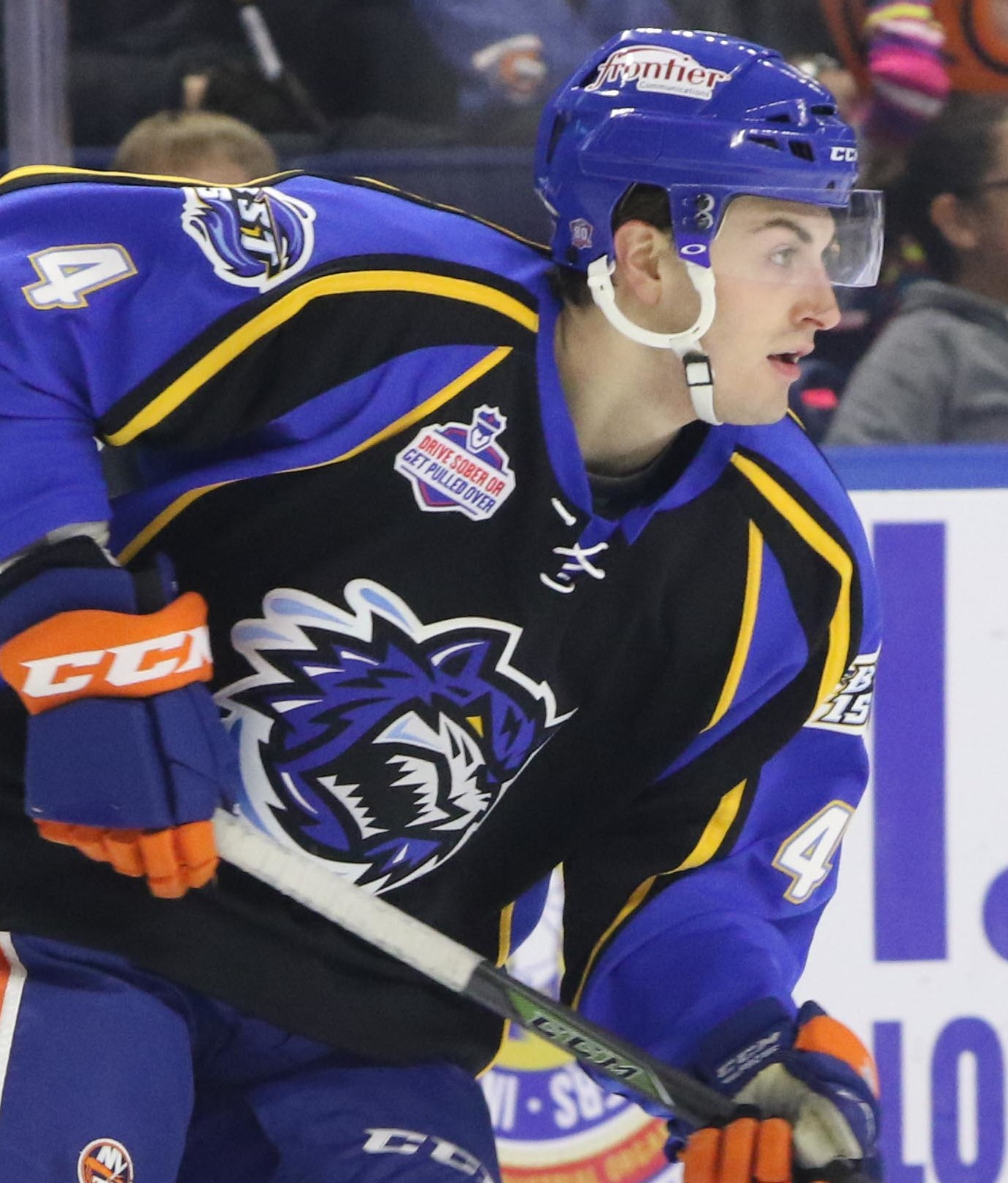
- Pelech with the Bridgeport Sound Tigers in 2015
- Born: August 16, 1994 (age 32) Toronto, Ontario, Canada
- Height: 6 ft 2 in (188 cm)
- Weight: 210 lb (95 kg; 15 st 0 lb)
- Position: Defence
- Shoots: Left
- NHL team: New York Islanders
- NHL draft: 65th overall, 2012; New York Islanders
- Playing career: 2014–present

Adam Pelech (/ˈpɛlɛk/ PEHL-ehk; born August 16, 1994) is a Canadian professional ice hockey player who is a defenceman for the New York Islanders of the National Hockey League (NHL).

Born and raised in Toronto, Pelech followed his older brothers Michael and Matthew into playing ice hockey. He played minor ice hockey with the Toronto Marlboros before being drafted by the Erie Otters of the Ontario Hockey League (OHL). During his time with the Otters, Pelech became the first player in program history to win the Ivan Tennant Memorial Award, the Bobby Smith Trophy, and represent Team Canada at the Ivan Hlinka Memorial Tournament. As a result of his major junior ice hockey play, Pelech was selected by the Islanders in the third round, 65th overall, of the 2012 NHL entry draft.

Pelech spent the majority of his first two seasons with the Islanders organization with their American Hockey League affiliate, the Bridgeport Sound Tigers, before making the jump to the NHL level. He made his NHL debut on November 13, in a 4–1 win over the Anaheim Ducks. Upon becoming a mainstay on the Islanders lineup, Pelech was utilized in shutdown and penalty-killing roles. He was soon considered an elite stay-at-home defenceman and was subsequently selected to represent the Islanders at the 2022 National Hockey League All-Star Game.

== Early life ==
Pelech was born on August 16, 1994, in Toronto, Ontario, Canada to former all-Canadian basketball player Bo Pelech. Growing up, Adam followed his older brothers Michael and Matthew into playing ice hockey.

== Playing career ==
=== Amateur ===
Pelech played minor ice hockey with the Toronto Marlboros under Connor Brown's father, whom he later listed as a huge influence on his career. Pelech helped the Marlboros qualify for the 2010 Ontario Hockey League (OHL) Cup by tallying six goals and 28 assists in 69 games. They eventually lost to the Mississauga Rebels led by captain Sean Monahan. As a result of his play with the Marlboros, Pelech was drafted in the second round by the Erie Otters during the OHL's 2010 Priority Draft.

Following the 2010 OHL draft, Pelech joined the Otters for the 2010–11 season. He played in 22 games, tallying five points, before being selected to represent Team Ontario at the 2011 World U-17 Hockey Challenge. At the same time, Pelech was named the Midwest Division OHL Academic Player of the Month for October for maintaining a high GPA while attending McDowell High School. During his rookie season, Pelech was partnered with Brett Cook and they became a shutdown pair. He finished the season with one goal and 12 assists for 13 points through 65 games and earned the Otters' Rookie of the Year award.

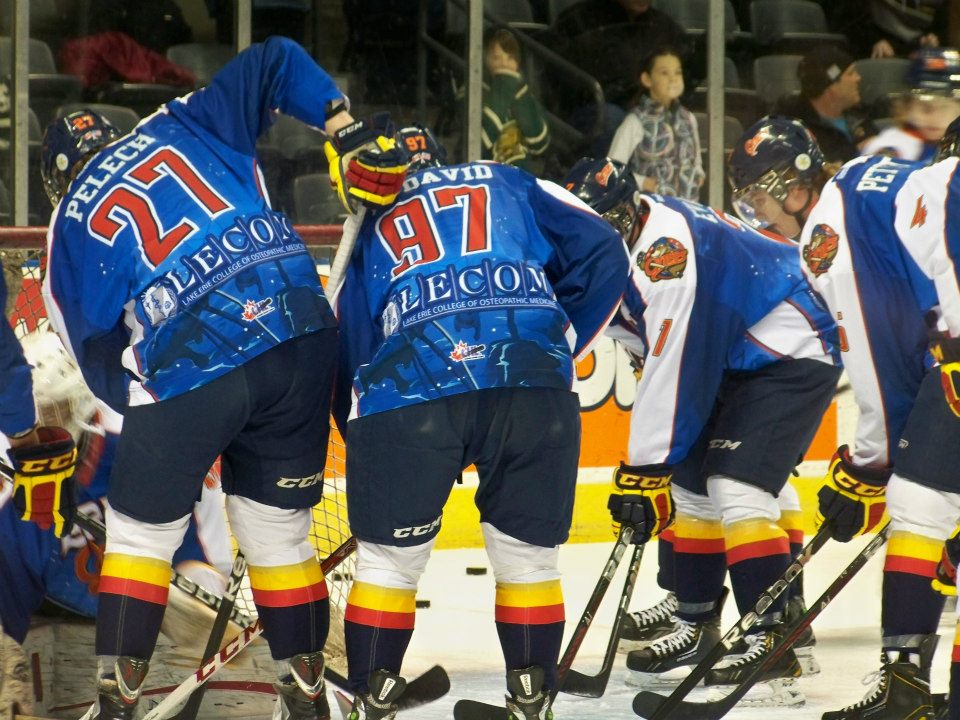
Pelech with the Erie Otters in 2013.

Prior to his sophomore season, Pelech was invited to attend Canada's Mens Summer Under-18 Team selection camp leading up to the 2011 Ivan Hlinka Memorial Tournament. He subsequently helped Team Canada win their fourth straight gold medal at the tournament before returning to North America. As the 2011–12 season continued, Pelech recovered from an injury and recorded six assists in eight games to become the first Otters defenceman since 2002 to be selected for the CHL/NHL Top Prospects Game. Following the game, Pelech earned a midterm ranking of 54th from the NHL Central Scouting Bureau and was selected to represent Team Canada at the 2012 IIHF World U18 Championships. At the time of the selection, Pelech had recorded two goals and 18 assists for 20 points in 44 games. He finished the season as the first OHL player in history to win the Ivan Tennant Memorial Award, the Bobby Smith Trophy, and represent Team Canada at the Ivan Hlinka Memorial Tournament.

Leading up to the 2012 NHL entry draft, Pelech earned a final ranking of 120th among North American skaters by the NHL Central Scouting Bureau. He was eventually selected in the third round, 65th overall, by the New York Islanders of the National Hockey League (NHL). Following the draft, Pelech was selected to participate in the 2012 CHL Canada/Russia Series. He was also named an alternate captain for the Otters alongside Troy Donnay and Stephen Harper. By November 2012, Pelech led Otters defencemen with 19 points in 20 games and tied for third among league defencemen.

=== Professional ===
==== Early years (2014–2017) ====
On March 15, 2014, Pelech signed a three-year, entry-level contract with the Islanders. At the time of the signing, he ranked third among OHL defencemen with 54 points in 59 games. Following the Islanders' 2014 training camp, Pelech was loaned to their American Hockey League (AHL) affiliate, the Bridgeport Sound Tigers, to start the 2014–15 season. He spent the entire season with the Sound Tigers and tallied 11 assists through 65 games.

Pelech returned to the Islanders for the 2015–16 season where he was again reassigned to the Sound Tigers. After tallying four points through 14 games, Pelech received his first NHL recall on November 9, 2015. He eventually made his debut a few games later on November 13, in a 4–1 win over the Anaheim Ducks. Pelech was reassigned to the AHL shortly thereafter but was again recalled to the Islanders later in the season on January 1, 2016, after Johnny Boychuk was injured. While playing with the Islanders, Pelech left warmups prior to a game with a seemingly minor injury, and was subsequently diagnosed with an "undisclosed injury". Pelech was held out for over two months before returning to the Islanders' minor league affiliate, and upon his return, his prior diagnosis of thoracic outlet syndrome was publicly announced. His treatment for this condition included surgery removing his first rib and portions of muscle and tissue. He finished the 2015–16 season by playing in nine games for the Islanders and averaging 17:34 per game.

In the final year of his contract, Pelech was again reassigned to the Sound Tigers for the 2016–17 season. In a similar fashion to the previous season, Pelech was recalled to the NHL level in November following injuries to their lineup. At the time of the recall, he had accumulated one goal and three assists in 10 games. During this recall, Pelech tallied his first career NHL goal on November 23 in the first period to help the Islanders win 3–2 over the Ducks. His success was short-lived however as he suffered an upper-body injury during a win over the Calgary Flames on November 28. He was eventually placed on the Islanders long-term injury reserve. After missing 14 games to recover, the Islanders reassigned Pelech to the AHL on December 31. He finished the season with three goals and seven assists in 44 games with the Islanders and earned praise from the teams' general manager Garth Snow as being "an important piece of our defensive core." On July 24, 2017, the Islanders re-signed Pelech to a four-year, $6.4 million contract worth $1.6 million annually.

==== Later years (2017–present) ====
Following the signing, Pelech began the 2017–18 season at the NHL level for the first time in his career. Early in the season, Pelech impressed coach Doug Weight enough that he was given a chance on the Islanders second power-play unit alongside Josh Bailey, Mathew Barzal, Andrew Ladd, and Brock Nelson. However, he soon suffered an upper-body injury and missed four games to recover before returning to the lineup on November 11. Upon returning, Pelech experienced an uptake in offensive output and set career highs in both assists and points by December. In his 100th career NHL game on January 30, 2018, Pelech scored the Islanders only goal in the 4–1 loss to the Florida Panthers. He later recorded his first career game-winning goal in a 4–1 win over the Pittsburgh Penguins on March 20. Pelech ended his first full season at the NHL level with a career-high three goals and 16 assists for 19 points through 78 games.

During the 2018 offseason, Calvin de Haan left the Islanders for the Carolina Hurricanes and Pelech was expected to replace him in the lineup. Throughout the preseason with new coach Barry Trotz, Pelech was paired alongside Ryan Pulock. By March 2019, Pelech recorded a career-high five goals to tie for second with Devon Toews among team defencemen in goals. He eventually finished the regular season establishing career highs in goals and points. His offensive and defensive play helped the Islanders qualify for the Stanley Cup playoffs for the first time since 2016. In the first round of the 2019 Stanley Cup playoffs, Pelech tallied two assists through an average 86:21 minute of ice time as the Islanders swept the Penguins. However, the team was eliminated during the second round by the Hurricanes.

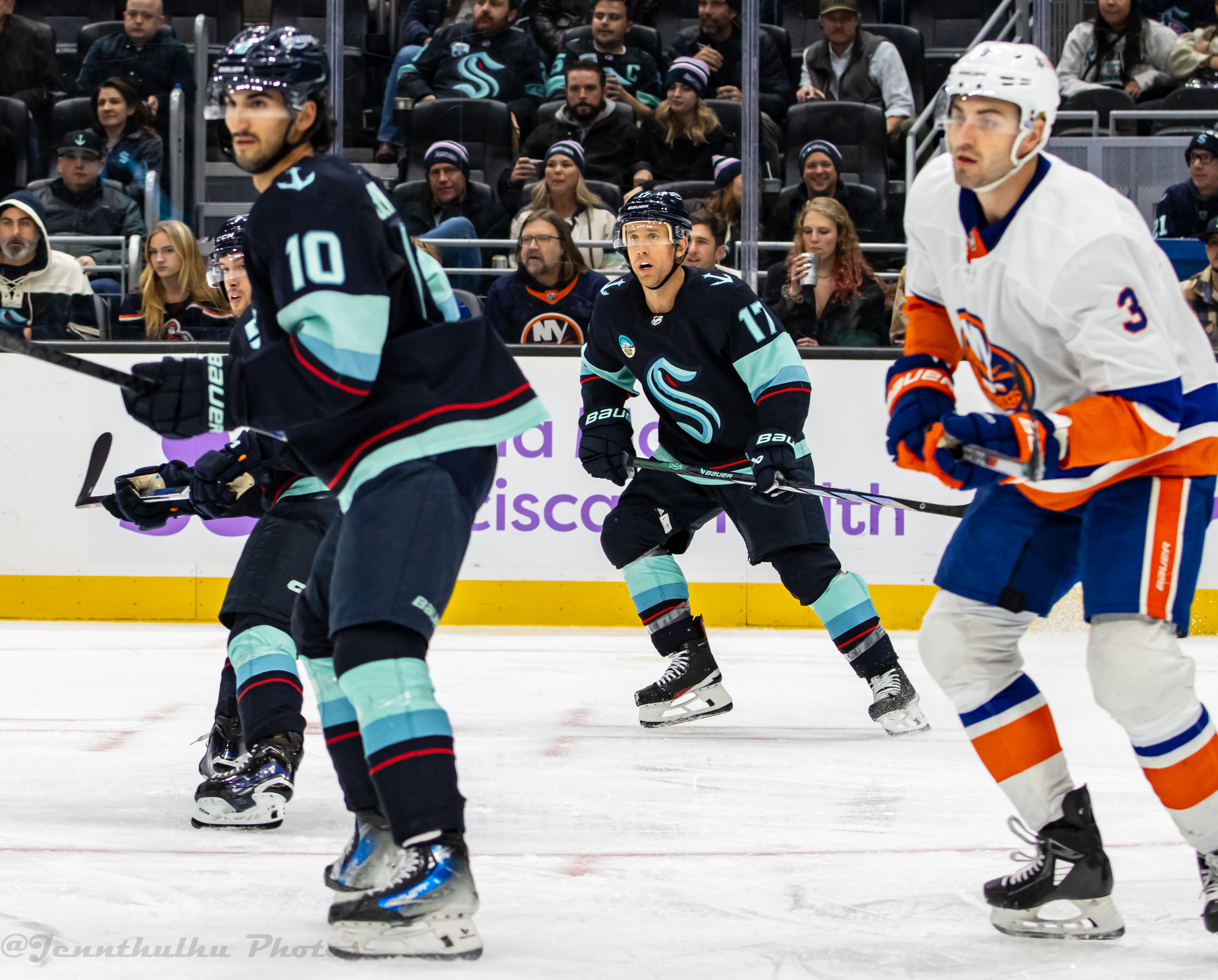
Pelech (right) with the Islanders in 2023.

Following another career-best season, Pelech returned to the Islanders for the 2019–20 season alongside his defensive partner Ryan Pulock. His season would be short-lived however as he suffered an injury to his Achilles tendon during the pregame warmup prior to a January game against the New Jersey Devils. Prior to the injury, Pelech was averaging the second-most minutes on the team and averaged the most shorthanded time per game. He had also recorded 2.18 blocks per game. Due to this injury, Pelech was replaced by Andy Greene on the Islanders shutdown and penalty-killing roles. However, due to the COVID-19 pandemic in North America, Pelech was able to return to the Islanders lineup once the NHL returned to play. He helped the Islanders beat the Panthers in the 2020 Stanley Cup playoffs Qualifiers by logging a team-high 20:13 of ice time per game and blocking a team-high 10 shots. In the second round, he recorded 46 hits through an average of 22:59 minutes of ice time per game as the Islanders beat the Washington Capitals in five games. Pelech continued to produce during the Eastern Conference Second Round against the Philadelphia Flyers to help the Islanders qualify for the Conference Finals. As the Islanders met the Tampa Bay Lightning in the Conference Finals, Pelech suffered an injury that kept him out of Game 6. He subsequently concluded the postseason with one goal and four assists through 21 games while averaging the second-most ice time on the team at 22:26 per game.

After undergoing surgery on his wrist, Pelech returned to the Islanders for the 2020–21 season. On May 4, 2021, Pelech played in his 300th career NHL game as the Islanders lost 4–3 to the Buffalo Sabres. He finished the regular–season with four goals and 10 assists through 56 games and added five points through 19 Stanley Cup Playoff games. On August 6, 2021, Pelech signed an eight-year, $46 million contract extension with the Islanders.

Following the contract extension, Pelech returned to the Islanders for the 2021–22 season. He continued to be productive on the defensive end for the Islanders as he recorded 45 hits and 46 blocks by January. On January 13, 2022, it was announced that Pelech would make his first NHL All-Star Game appearance on February 6, 2022, in Las Vegas, Nevada.

== International play ==
As a Canadian citizen, Pelech has represented Team Canada at the junior level in various international tournaments. His first international tournament with the Canada men's national junior ice hockey team was at the 2011 Ivan Hlinka Memorial Tournament where he helped them win a gold medal. The following year, he was again chosen to represent Team Canada on the international stage during the 2012 IIHF World U18 Championships where he helped them win a bronze medal. His final junior level tournament was during the 2014 World Junior Ice Hockey Championships.

== Personal life ==
Pelech married his longtime girlfriend Jen in 2022.

== Career statistics ==
=== Regular season and playoffs ===
			Regular season					Playoffs
Season	Team	League	GP	G	A	Pts	PIM	GP	G	A	Pts	PIM
2010–11	Erie Otters	OHL	65	1	12	13	27	7	0	2	2	2
2011–12	Erie Otters	OHL	44	2	18	20	52	—	—	—	—	—
2012–13	Erie Otters	OHL	59	8	32	40	98	—	—	—	—	—
2013–14	Erie Otters	OHL	60	9	45	54	46	14	2	5	7	10
2014–15	Bridgeport Sound Tigers	AHL	65	0	11	11	48	—	—	—	—	—
2015–16	Bridgeport Sound Tigers	AHL	27	2	5	7	6	—	—	—	—	—
2015–16	New York Islanders	NHL	9	0	2	2	0	—	—	—	—	—
2016–17	Bridgeport Sound Tigers	AHL	13	1	4	5	10	—	—	—	—	—
2016–17	New York Islanders	NHL	44	3	7	10	6	—	—	—	—	—
2017–18	New York Islanders	NHL	78	3	16	19	28	—	—	—	—	—
2018–19	New York Islanders	NHL	78	5	16	21	24	8	0	2	2	6
2019–20	New York Islanders	NHL	38	1	8	9	20	21	1	4	5	8
2020–21	New York Islanders	NHL	56	4	10	14	18	19	1	4	5	13
2021–22	New York Islanders	NHL	78	3	25	28	42	—	—	—	—	—
2022–23	New York Islanders	NHL	61	6	15	21	36	6	1	1	2	2
2023–24	New York Islanders	NHL	58	1	15	16	27	5	0	2	2	4
2024–25	New York Islanders	NHL	60	1	21	21	32	—	—	—	—	—
2025–26	New York Islanders	NHL	82	4	12	16	50	—	—	—	—	—
NHL totals			642	30	147	177	283	59	3	13	16	33

=== International ===
Year	Team	Event	Result	GP	G	A	Pts	PIM
2011	Canada Ontario	U17	1st place, gold medalist(s)	5	0	1	1	2
2011	Canada	IH18	1st place, gold medalist(s)	5	0	0	0	6
2012	Canada	U18	3rd place, bronze medalist(s)	7	0	0	0	8
2014	Canada	WJC	4th	7	0	1	1	2
Junior totals				24	0	2	2	18

== Awards and honours ==
Award	Year	Ref
OHL
Bobby Smith Trophy	2012	
Ivan Tennant Memorial Award	2012	
CHL/NHL Top Prospects Game	2012	
OHL Second All-Star Team	2014	
NHL
All-Star Game	2022	
