= John Negrin =

Canadian professional ice hockey player (born 1989)

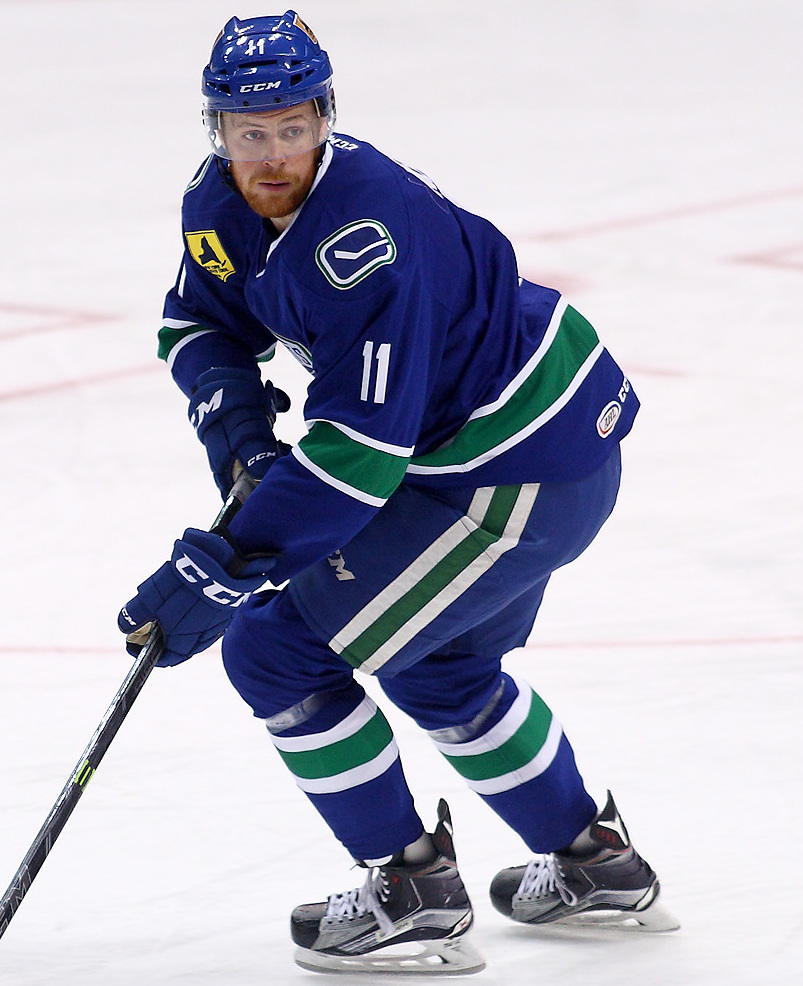
- Negrin with the Utica Comets during the 2015-16 season
- Born: March 26, 1989 (age 37) West Vancouver, British Columbia, Canada
- Height: 6 ft 2 in (188 cm)
- Weight: 190 lb (86 kg; 13 st 8 lb)
- Position: Defence
- Shot: Left
- Played for: Calgary Flames; Lørenskog IK; MAC Újbuda; Manchester Storm
- NHL draft: 70th overall, 2007; Calgary Flames
- Playing career: 2009–2020

John Negrin (born March 26, 1989) is a Canadian former professional ice hockey player. Negrin was a third-round pick of the Calgary Flames, 70th overall, at the 2007 NHL entry draft; he played only three games with them and has spent the majority of his career playing in the American Hockey League.

== Playing career ==
As a youth, Negrin played in the 2002 Quebec International Pee-Wee Hockey Tournament with a minor ice hockey team from North Vancouver.

A graduate of the Western Hockey League (WHL), Negrin played the 2008–09 WHL season with the Kootenay Ice and Swift Current Broncos. Upon the conclusion of his junior season, Negrin was assigned to the Quad City Flames, though he was recalled by Calgary on an emergency basis on April 3, 2009 before he could play an AHL game. He made his NHL debut that night against the Minnesota Wild and finished the season with Calgary. Negrin's 2009–10 season, his first professional season in Abbotsford, was reduced to just 45 games by a broken wrist. On January 30, 2012 Negrin was traded from the Calgary Flames to the Winnipeg Jets in exchange for forward Akim Aliu. He was then assigned to the Jets' AHL team, the St. John's IceCaps.

Negrin signed with the AHL's Chicago Wolves on August 20, 2012. On October 10, 2012 Negrin was assigned to the Kalamazoo Wings of the ECHL to begin the 2012–13 season. where he played in 32 games before he was recalled to Chicago on 14 January 2013. After one appearance with the Wolves, Negrin was reassigned to Kalamazoo. On February 27, 2013, Negrin received his second recall by the Wolves to be immediately loaned to fellow AHL club, the Lake Erie Monsters. For the remainder of the season, Negrin was a fixture in the Monsters blueline scoring 2 goals in 17 games.

On July 19, 2013, Negrin signed as a free agent to a one-year contract AHL contract with the Utica Comets, an affiliate of the Vancouver Canucks.

As a free agent from the Comets following four seasons with the club, Negrin went un-signed into the 2017–18 season. On October 21, 2017, Negrin belatedly signed with Norwegian club, Lørenskog IK of GET-ligaen.

In August 2019, Negrin signed with British Elite League (EIHL) club Manchester Storm.

== Career statistics ==
=== Regular season and playoffs ===
			Regular season					Playoffs
Season	Team	League	GP	G	A	Pts	PIM	GP	G	A	Pts	PIM
2004–05	Kootenay Ice	WHL	2	0	0	0	0	—	—	—	—	—
2004–05	Surrey Eagles	BCHL	4	0	0	0	0	—	—	—	—	—
2005–06	Kootenay Ice	WHL	55	3	7	10	48	6	0	0	0	6
2006–07	Kootenay Ice	WHL	44	1	15	16	57	7	0	2	2	8
2007–08	Kootenay Ice	WHL	71	1	41	42	68	10	1	1	2	8
2008–09	Kootenay Ice	WHL	38	5	26	31	27	—	—	—	—	—
2008–09	Swift Current Broncos	WHL	25	3	15	18	22	7	2	4	6	8
2008–09	Calgary Flames	NHL	3	0	1	1	2	—	—	—	—	—
2009–10	Abbotsford Heat	AHL	45	5	10	15	28	—	—	—	—	—
2010–11	Abbotsford Heat	AHL	24	0	6	6	24	—	—	—	—	—
2011–12	Abbotsford Heat	AHL	26	0	1	1	12	—	—	—	—	—
2011–12	Utah Grizzlies	ECHL	9	1	5	6	10	—	—	—	—	—
2011–12	St. John's Ice Caps	AHL	14	0	3	3	6	—	—	—	—	—
2012–13	Kalamazoo Wings	ECHL	44	2	7	9	37	—	—	—	—	—
2012–13	Chicago Wolves	AHL	1	0	1	1	0	—	—	—	—	—
2012–13	Lake Erie Monsters	AHL	17	2	2	4	19	—	—	—	—	—
2013–14	Utica Comets	AHL	16	0	1	1	10	—	—	—	—	—
2014–15	Utica Comets	AHL	35	0	3	3	12	—	—	—	—	—
2014–15	Kalamazoo Wings	ECHL	5	0	3	3	2	—	—	—	—	—
2015–16	Utica Comets	AHL	58	1	10	11	22	1	0	0	0	0
2016–17	Utica Comets	AHL	22	0	5	5	12	—	—	—	—	—
2017–18	Lørenskog IK	GET	24	2	13	15	12	4	0	0	0	8
2018–19	MAC Újbuda	Slovak	35	4	8	12	30	8	0	1	1	4
2019–20	Manchester Storm	EIHL	24	0	7	7	8	—	—	—	—	—
NHL totals			3	0	1	1	2	—	—	—	—	—

=== International ===
Year	Team	Event	Result	GP	G	A	Pts	PIM
2006	Canada Pacific	U17	4th	6	0	4	4	6
2007	Canada	U18	4th	6	0	1	1	2
Junior totals				12	0	5	5	8

== Awards and honours ==
Award	Year	Ref.
WHL
East Second All-Star Team	2009	
CHL Top Prospects Game	2007	
