= List of Calgary Flames records =

This is a list of franchise records for the Calgary Flames of the National Hockey League.

== Career ==
=== Skaters ===
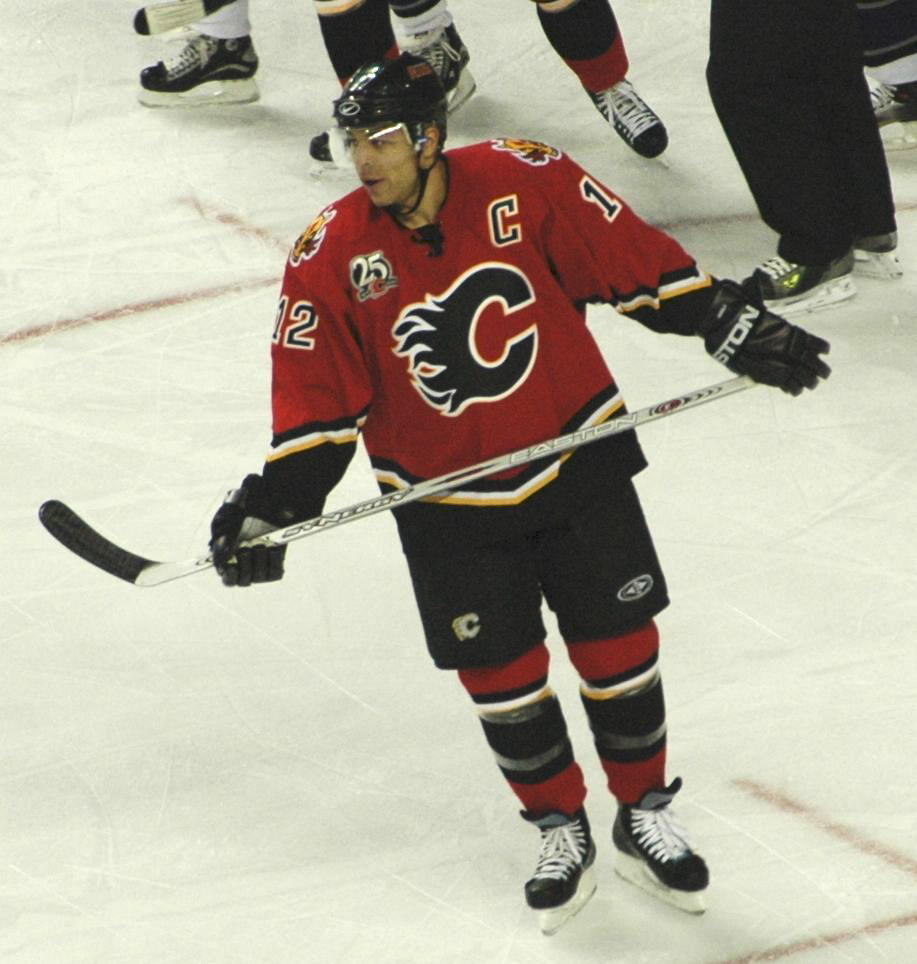
Jarome Iginla is the Flames' all-time leader in games played, goals and points.

Games played
| # | Player | GP | Seasons |
|---|---|---|---|
| 1 | Jarome Iginla | 1219 | 1996–2013 |
| 2 | **Mikael Backlund** | 993 | 2008–Present |
| 3 | Mark Giordano | 949 | 2005–2021 |
| 4 | Robyn Regehr | 826 | 1999-2011 |
| 5 | Al MacInnis | 803 | 1981–1994 |
Active leader
| 2 | **Mikael Backlund** | 993 | 2008–Present |

Goals
| # | Player | G | Seasons |
|---|---|---|---|
| 1 | Jarome Iginla | 525 | 1996–2013 |
| 2 | Theoren Fleury | 364 | 1988–1999 |
| 3 | Joe Nieuwendyk | 314 | 1987–1995 |
| 4 | Gary Roberts | 257 | 1987–1996 |
| 5 | Kent Nilsson | 229 | 1980–1985 |
Active leader
| 11 | **Mikael Backlund** | 201 | 2008–present |

Assists
| # | Player | A | Seasons |
|---|---|---|---|
| 1 | Al MacInnis | 609 | 1981–1994 |
| 2 | Jarome Iginla | 570 | 1996–2013 |
| 3 | Theoren Fleury | 460 | 1988–1999 |
| 4 | Gary Suter | 437 | 1985–1994 |
| 5 | Johnny Gaudreau | 399 | 2013–2022 |
Active leader
| 10 | **Mikael Backlund** | 331 | 2008–Present |

Points
| # | Player | Pts | Seasons |
|---|---|---|---|
| 1 | Jarome Iginla | 1095 | 1996–2013 |
| 2 | Theoren Fleury | 830 | 1988–1999 |
| 3 | Al MacInnis | 822 | 1981–1994 |
| 4 | Joe Nieuwendyk | 616 | 1987–1995 |
| 5 | Johnny Gaudreau | 609 | 2013–2022 |
Active leader
| 8 | **Mikael Backlund** | 532 | 2008–present |

Penalties in minutes
| # | Player | PIM | Seasons |
|---|---|---|---|
| 1 | Tim Hunter | 2,405 | 1981–1992 |
| 2 | Gary Roberts | 1,736 | 1987–1996 |
| 3 | Joel Otto | 1,642 | 1985–1995 |
| 4 | Jim Peplinski | 1,467 | 1980–1990; 1994–1995 |
| 5 | Theoren Fleury | 1,339 | 1988–1999 |
Active leader
| 29 | **Mikael Backlund** | 459 | 2008–Present |

Even strength goals
| # | Player | ESG | Seasons |
|---|---|---|---|
| 1 | Jarome Iginla | 351 | 1996–2013 |
| 2 | Theoren Fleury | 229 | 1988–1999 |
| 3 | Gary Roberts | 199 | 1986–1996 |
| 4 | Joe Nieuwendyk | 173 | 1987–1995 |
| 5 | Johnny Gaudreau | 164 | 2013–2022 |
Active leader
| 8 | **Mikael Backlund** | 149 | 2008–present |

Power play goals
| # | Player | PPG | Seasons |
|---|---|---|---|
| 1 | Jarome Iginla | 161 | 1996–2013 |
| 2 | Joe Nieuwendyk | 130 | 1987–1996 |
| 3 | Theoren Fleury | 107 | 1988–1999 |
| 4 | Al MacInnis | 102 | 1981-1994 |
| 5 | Kent Nilsson | 79 | 1980–1985 |
Active leader
| 28 | **Mikael Backlund** | 35 | 2008–present |

Short-handed goals
| # | Player | SHG | Seasons |
|---|---|---|---|
| 1 | Theoren Fleury | 28 | 1988–1999 |
| 2 | **Mikael Backlund** | 17 | 2008–present |
| 3 | Kent Nilsson | 16 | 1980–1985 |
| 4 | Jarome Iginla | 13 | 1996–2013 |
| 5 | Bill Clement | 13 | 1988-1994 |
Active leader
| 2 | **Mikael Backlund** | 17 | 2008–present |

Game-winning goals
| # | Player | GWG | Seasons |
|---|---|---|---|
| 1 | Jarome Iginla | 83 | 1996–2013 |
| 2 | Theoren Fleury | 53 | 1988–1999 |
| 3 | Sean Monahan | 47 | 2013–2022 |
| 4 | Joe Nieuwendyk | 43 | 1986-1995 |
| 5 | Johnny Gaudreau | 41 | 2013–2022 |
Active leader
| 6 | **Mikael Backlund** | 36 | 2008–present |

Hat tricks
| # | Player | Hat tricks | Seasons |
|---|---|---|---|
| 1 | Kent Nilsson | 14 | 1980–1985 |
| 2 | Theoren Fleury | 13 | 1988–1999 |
| 3 | Jarome Iginla | 12 | 1996–2013 |
| 4 | Joe Nieuwendyk | 10 | 1987–1996 |
| 4 | Gary Roberts | 10 | 1986–1996 |
| 5 | Lanny McDonald | 9 | 1981–1989 |
Active leader
| 37 | **Mikael Backlund** | 1 | 2008–Present |

Bolded denotes player currently playing for the Flames

=== Goaltenders ===
Games played
| # | Player | GP | Seasons |
|---|---|---|---|
| 1 | Miikka Kiprusoff | 576 | 2003–2013 |
| 2 | Mike Vernon | 527 | 1982–1994; 2000–2002 |
| 3 | Rejean Lemelin | 302 | 1980–1987 |
| 4 | Jacob Markström | 187 | 2020–2024 |
| 5 | Trevor Kidd | 178 | 1991–1997 |
Active leader
| 18 | **Daniel Vladař** | 72 | 2022–present |

Losses
| # | Player | L | Seasons |
|---|---|---|---|
| 1 | Miikka Kiprusoff | 192 | 2003–2013 |
| 2 | Mike Vernon | 188 | 1982–1994; 2000–2002 |
| 3 | Rejean Lemelin | 89 | 1980–1987 |
| 4 | Roman Turek | 68 | 2001–2004 |
| 5 | Trevor Kidd | 66 | 1991–1997 |
Active leader
| 20 | **Daniel Vladař** | 21 | 2022–present |

Wins
| # | Player | W | Seasons |
|---|---|---|---|
| 1 | Miikka Kiprusoff | 305 | 2003–2013 |
| 2 | Mike Vernon | 262 | 1982–1994; 2000–2002 |
| 3 | Rejean Lemelin | 136 | 1980–1987 |
| 4 | Jacob Markström | 92 | 2020–present |
| 5 | Trevor Kidd | 72 | 1991–1997 |
Active leader
| 16 | **Daniel Vladař** | 37 | 2022–present |

Shutouts
| # | Player | SO | Seasons |
|---|---|---|---|
| 1 | Miikka Kiprusoff | 41 | 2003–2013 |
| 2 | Jacob Markström | 14 | 2020–present |
| 3 | Mike Vernon | 13 | 1982–1994; 2000–2002 |
| 4 | Roman Turek | 12 | 2001–2004 |
| 5 | Fred Brathwaite | 11 | 1998–2001 |
Active leader
| 20 | **Daniel Vladař** | 2 | 2022–present |

=== Coaches ===
Games coached
| # | Coach | GC | Seasons |
|---|---|---|---|
| 1 | Darryl Sutter | 404 | 2002–2006; 2020–2023 |
| 2 | Bob Johnson | 400 | 1982–1987 |
| 3 | Bob Hartley | 294 | 2012–2016 |
| 4 | Al MacNeil | 251 | 1980–2003 |
| 5 | Brent Sutter | 246 | 2009–2012 |
Active leader
| - | **Ryan Huska** | - | - |

Games won
| # | Coach | GW | Seasons |
|---|---|---|---|
| 1 | Darryl Sutter | 210 | 2002–2006; 2020–2023 |
| 2 | Bob Johnson | 193 | 1982–1987 |
| 3 | Terry Crisp | 144 | 1987–1990 |
| 4 | Bob Hartley | 134 | 2012–2016 |
| 5 | Brent Sutter | 118 | 2009–2012 |
Active leader
| - | **Ryan Huska** | - | - |

== Single season records ==
=== Team ===
Wins
| # | W | Season |
|---|---|---|
| 1 | 54 | 1988–89 |
| 2 | 50 | 2018–19 |
| 3 | 50 | 2021-22 |
| 4 | 48 | 1987–88 |
| 5 | 46 | 1986–87 |

Most goals for
| # | GF | Season |
|---|---|---|
| 1 | 397 | 1987–88 |
| 2 | 363 | 1984–85 |
| 3 | 354 | 1985–86 |
| 3 | 354 | 1988–89 |
| 4 | 348 | 1989–90 |

Most goals against
| # | GA | Season |
|---|---|---|
| 1 | 345 | 1981–82 |
| 2 | 317 | 1982–83 |
| 3 | 315 | 1985–86 |
| 4 | 314 | 1983–84 |
| 5 | 305 | 1987–88 |
| 5 | 305 | 1991–92 |

Points
| # | Pts | Season |
|---|---|---|
| 1 | 117 | 1988–89 |
| 2 | 111 | 2021–22 |
| 3 | 107 | 2018–19 |
| 4 | 105 | 1987–88 |
| 5 | 103 | 2005–06 |

Fewest goals for (minimum 78 game season)
| # | GF | Season |
|---|---|---|
| 1 | 186 | 2002–03 |
| 2 | 197 | 2000–01 |
| 3 | 200 | 2003–04 |
| 4 | 201 | 2001–02 |
| 5 | 202 | 2011–12 |

Fewest goals against (minimum 78 game season)
| # | GA | Season |
|---|---|---|
| 1 | 176 | 2003–04 |
| 2 | 200 | 2005–06 |
| 3 | 208 | 2021–22 |
| 4 | 210 | 2009–10 |
| 5 | 216 | 2014–15 |

=== Skaters ===
Goals
| # | Player | G | Season |
|---|---|---|---|
| 1 | Lanny McDonald | 66 | 1982–83 |
| 2 | Gary Roberts | 53 | 1991–92 |
| 3 | Jarome Iginla | 52 | 2001–02 |
| 4 | Joe Nieuwendyk | 51 | 1987–88; 1988–89 |
| 4 | Joe Mullen | 51 | 1988–89 |
| 4 | Theoren Fleury | 51 | 1990–91 |

Assists
| # | Player | A | Season |
|---|---|---|---|
| 1 | Kent Nilsson | 82 | 1980–81 |
| 2 | Al MacInnis | 75 | 1990–91 |
| 3 | Johnny Gaudreau | 75 | 2021–22 |
| 4 | Gary Suter | 70 | 1987–88 |
| 5 | Doug Gilmour | 67 | 1989–90 |

Points
| # | Player | Pts | Season |
|---|---|---|---|
| 1 | Kent Nilsson | 131 | 1980–81 |
| 2 | Johnny Gaudreau | 115 | 2021–22 |
| 3 | Joe Mullen | 110 | 1988–89 |
| 4 | Hakan Loob | 106 | 1987–88 |
| 5 | Kent Nilsson | 104 | 1982–83 |

Penalties in minutes
| # | Player | PIM | Season |
|---|---|---|---|
| 1 | Tim Hunter | 375 | 1988–89 |
| 2 | Tim Hunter | 361 | 1986–87 |
| 3 | Ron Stern | 338 | 1991–92 |
| 4 | Tim Hunter | 337 | 1987–88 |
| 5 | Tim Hunter | 291 | 1985–86 |

=== Goaltenders ===
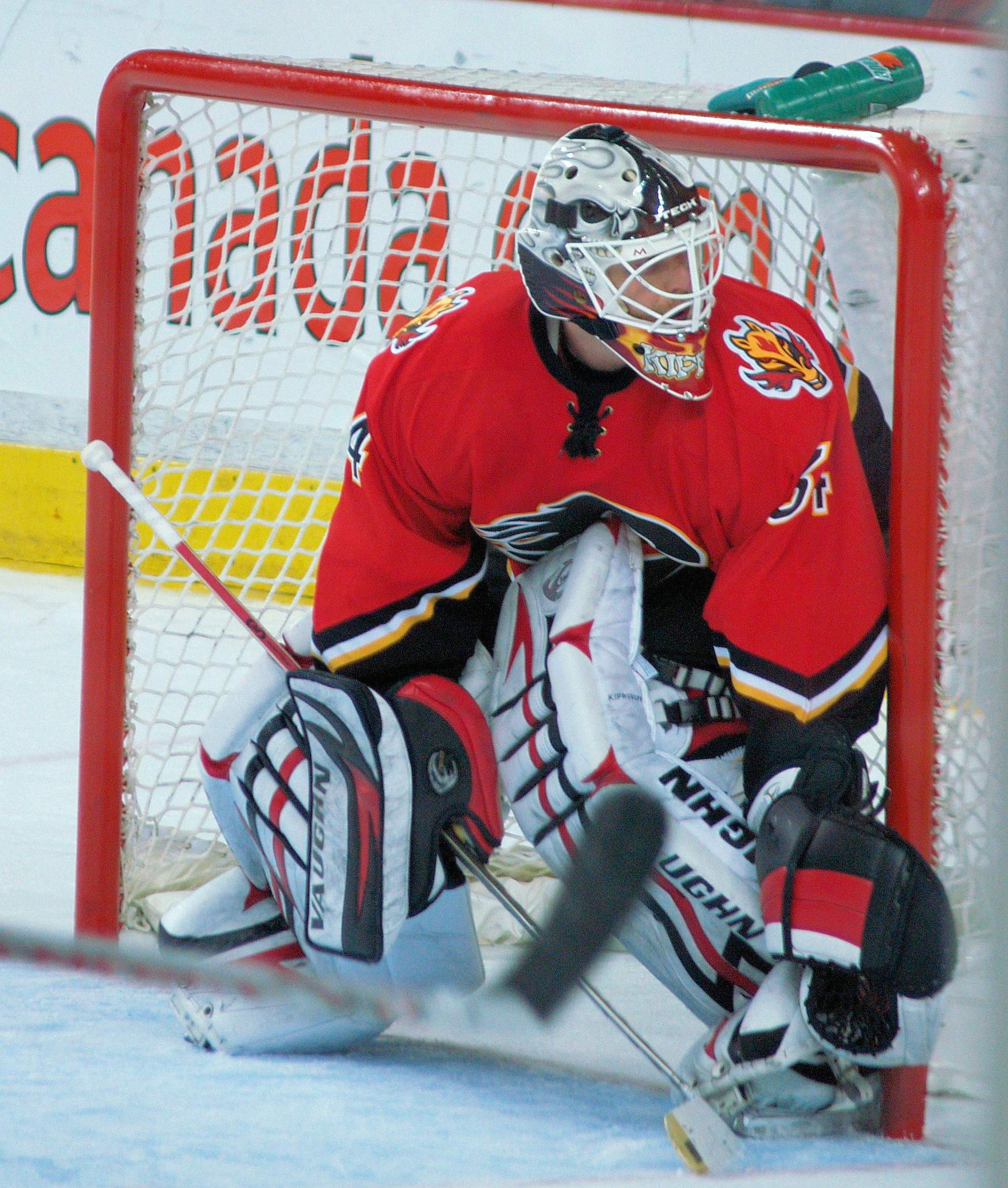
Miikka Kiprusoff holds the Flames franchise record for wins in a season with 45.

Wins
| # | Player | W | Season |
|---|---|---|---|
| 1 | Miikka Kiprusoff | 45 | 2008–09 |
| 2 | Miikka Kiprusoff | 42 | 2005–06 |
| 3 | Miikka Kiprusoff | 40 | 2006–07 |
| 4 | Mike Vernon | 39 | 1987–88 |
| 4 | Miikka Kiprusoff | 39 | 2007–08 |

Losses
| # | Player | L | Season |
|---|---|---|---|
| 1 | Mike Vernon | 30 | 1991–92 |
| 2 | Roman Turek | 29 | 2002–03 |
| 3 | Roman Turek | 28 | 2001–02 |
| 3 | Miikka Kiprusoff | 28 | 2009-10 |
| 5 | Mike Vernon | 26 | 1992–93 |
| 5 | Miikka Kiprusoff | 26 | 2007-08 |

== Career playoff leaders ==
=== Skaters ===
Games played
| # | Player | GP | Seasons |
|---|---|---|---|
| 1 | Jim Peplinski | 99 | 1980–1990; 1994–1995 |
| 2 | Al MacInnis | 95 | 1981–1994 |
| 3 | Joel Otto | 87 | 1985–1995 |
| 4 | Tim Hunter | 86 | 1981–1992 |
| 5 | Jamie Macoun | 84 | 1982–1992 |
Active leader
| 19 | Mikael Backlund | 42 | 2008–Present |

Goals
| # | Player | G | Seasons |
|---|---|---|---|
| 1 | Joe Mullen | 35 | 1985–1990 |
| 2 | Joe Nieuwendyk | 32 | 1987–1995 |
| 3 | Theoren Fleury | 29 | 1988–1999 |
| 4 | Jarome Iginla | 28 | 1996–2013 |
| 5 | Hakan Loob | 26 | 1983–1989 |
| 6 | Al MacInnis | 25 | 1981–1994 |
Active leader
| 13 | Mikael Backlund | 12 | 2008–Present |

Assists
| # | Player | A | Seasons |
|---|---|---|---|
| 1 | Al MacInnis | 77 | 1981–1994 |
| 2 | Paul Reinhart | 51 | 1979–1988 |
| 3 | Joel Otto | 38 | 1985–1995 |
| 4 | Theoren Fleury | 33 | 1988–1999 |
| 4 | Gary Suter | 33 | 1985–1994 |
Active leader
| 31 | Mikael Backlund | 10 | 2008–present |

Points
| # | Player | Pts | Seasons |
|---|---|---|---|
| 1 | Al MacInnis | 102 | 1981–1994 |
| 2 | Paul Reinhart | 72 | 1979–1988 |
| 3 | Theoren Fleury | 62 | 1988–1999 |
| 3 | Joel Otto | 61 | 1985–1995 |
| 5 | Joe Nieuwendyk | 60 | 1987–1995 |
Active leader
| 22 | Mikael Backlund | 22 | 2008–Present |

Penalties in minutes
| # | Player | PIM | Seasons |
|---|---|---|---|
| 1 | Jim Peplinski | 382 | 1980–1990; 1994–1995 |
| 2 | Tim Hunter | 352 | 1981–1992 |
| 3 | Gary Roberts | 216 | 1987–1996 |
| 4 | Joel Otto | 188 | 1985–1995 |
| 5 | Al MacInnis | 153 | 1981–1994 |
Active leader
| 44 | Mikael Backlund | 32 | 2008–present |

=== Goaltenders ===
Games played
| # | Player | GP | Seasons |
|---|---|---|---|
| 1 | Mike Vernon | 81 | 1982–1994; 2000–2002 |
| 2 | Miikka Kiprusoff | 52 | 2003–2013 |
| 3 | Rejean Lemelin | 30 | 1980–1987 |
| 4 | Pat Riggin | 14 | 1980–1982 |
| 5 | Jacob Markström | 12 | 2020-2024 |
Active leader
| 19 | Daniel Vladař | 1 | 2022-current |

Losses
| # | Player | L | Seasons |
|---|---|---|---|
| 1 | Mike Vernon | 33 | 1982–1994; 2000–2002 |
| 2 | Miikka Kiprusoff | 27 | 2003–2013 |
| 3 | Rejean Lemelin | 15 | 1980–1987 |
| 4 | Jacob Markström | 7 | 2020-2024 |
| 5 | Pat Riggin | 7 | 1980–1982 |
Active leader
| 21 | Daniel Vladař | 0 | 2022-current |

Wins
| # | Player | W | Seasons |
|---|---|---|---|
| 1 | Mike Vernon | 43 | 1982–1994; 2000–2002 |
| 2 | Miikka Kiprusoff | 24 | 2003–2013 |
| 3 | Rejean Lemelin | 11 | 1980–1987 |
| 4 | Pat Riggin | 6 | 1980–1982 |
| 5 | Cam Talbot | 5 | 2019-current |
Active leader
| 19 | Daniel Vladař | 0 | 2022-current |

Shutouts
| # | Player | SO | Seasons |
|---|---|---|---|
| 1 | Miikka Kiprusoff | 6 | 2003–2013 |
| 2 | Mike Vernon | 3 | 1982–1994; 2000–2002 |
| 3 | Cam Talbot | 2 | 2019-current |
| 4 | Jacob Markström | 1 | 2020-current |
| 5 | Trevor Kidd | 1 | 1991–1992; 1993–1997 |
Active leader
| - | - | - | - |

=== Coaches ===
- *Interim Head Coach

Games coached
| # | Coach | GC | Seasons |
|---|---|---|---|
| 1 | Bob Johnson | 52 | 1982–1987 |
| 2 | Darryl Sutter | 45 | 2002–2006; 2020–Current |
| 3 | Terry Crisp | 37 | 1987–1990 |
| 4 | Al MacNeil | 23 | 1979–1982; 2002–2003 |
| 5 | Dave King | 20 | 1992–1995 |
Active leader
| - | - | - | - |

Games won
| # | Coach | GW | Seasons |
|---|---|---|---|
| 1 | Bob Johnson | 25 | 1982–1987 |
| 2 | Darryl Sutter | 23 | 2002–2006; 2020–Current |
| 3 | Terry Crisp | 22 | 1987–1990 |
| 4 | Al MacNeil | 10 | 1979–1982; 2002–2003 |
| 5 | Dave King | 8 | 1992–1995 |
Active leader
| - | - | - | - |

== Single season playoff records ==
=== Team ===
Games played
| # | GP | Season |
|---|---|---|
| 1 | 26 | 2004 |
| 2 | 22 | 1986 |
| 2 | 22 | 1989 |
| 4 | 16 | 1981 |
| 5 | 11 | 1984 |

Goals for
| # | GF | Season |
|---|---|---|
| 1 | 81 | 1986 |
| 1 | 81 | 1989 |
| 3 | 58 | 2004 |
| 4 | 55 | 1981 |
| 5 | 41 | 1984 |
| 5 | 41 | 1988 |

Goals against
| # | GA | Season |
|---|---|---|
| 1 | 69 | 1986 |
| 2 | 60 | 1981 |
| 3 | 55 | 1989 |
| 4 | 51 | 2004 |
| 5 | 49 | 1983 |

Wins
| # | W | Season |
|---|---|---|
| 1 | 16 | 1989 |
| 2 | 15 | 2004 |
| 3 | 12 | 1986 |
| 4 | 9 | 1981 |
| 5 | 6 | 1984 |

Losses
| # | L | Season |
|---|---|---|
| 1 | 11 | 2004 |
| 2 | 10 | 1986 |
| 3 | 7 | 1981 |
| 4 | 6 | 1988–89 |
| 5 | 5 | Three times |

=== Players ===
| | Player | Total | Year |
| Goals | Joe Mullen | 16 | 1989 |
| Points | Al MacInnis | 31 | 1989 |
| Assists | Al MacInnis | 24 | 1989 |
| Penalty Minutes | Jim Peplinski | 107 | 1986 |
| Points (defenceman) | Al MacInnis | 31 | 1989 |

| | Player | Total | Year |
| Games played | Miikka Kiprusoff | 26 | 2004 |
| Minutes Played | Miikka Kiprusoff | 1655 | 2004 |
| Wins | Mike Vernon | 16 | 1989 |
| Shutouts | Miikka Kiprusoff | 5 | 2004 |

== Single game records ==
=== Team ===
| | Total | Date(s) |
| Longest winning streak | 10 games | October 14–November 3, 1978; February 21-March 13, 2017; January 29-February 21, 2022 |
| Longest unbeaten streak | 13 games | November 10–December 8, 1988 |
| Longest losing streak | 11 games | December 14, 1985 – January 7, 1986 |
| Longest winless streak | 11 games | December 14, 1985 – January 7, 1986 |
| Goals for | 13 | Flames 13, Sharks 1, February 10, 1993 |
| Goals against | 12 | Flames 4, Red Wings 12, October 29, 1981 |
| Goals for, one period | 7 | Third period, Flames 11, Kings 4, October 17, 1988 |
| Goals against, one period | 6 | Five times, most recently January 7, 1984 |
| Total goals | 18 | Flames 10, Nordiques 8, February 23, 1991 |
| Fastest two goals for | 4 seconds | October 17, 1989 vs. Nordiques |
| Fastest three goals for | 36 seconds | February 10, 1993 vs. Sharks |
| Fastest four goals for | 1 minute, 21 seconds | February 10, 1993 vs. Sharks |
| Most shots for | 62 | January 26, 2022 vs. Blue Jackets |
| Most shots against | 57 | January 23, 1977 vs. Rangers |
| Fewest shots for | 8 | October 27, 1995 vs. Red Wings |
| Fewest shots against | 12 | Five times, most recently March 21, 1999 vs. Islanders |

=== Player ===
| | Total | Date(s) |
| Most goals | 5 | Joe Nieuwendyk, January 11, 1989 vs. Jets |
| Most assists | 6 | Guy Chouinard, February 25, 1981 vs. Islanders; Gary Suter, April 4, 1986 vs. Oilers |
| Most points | 7 | Sergei Makarov, February 25, 1990 vs. Oilers (2 goals, 5 assists) |
| Most points (goaltender) | 3 | Jeff Reese, February 10, 1993 vs. Sharks (3 assists; NHL record) |
| Penalties in minutes | 41 | Neil Sheehy, March 21, 1986 vs. Canucks |
| Shots | 13 | Al MacInnis, March 23, 1993 vs. Blues; Theoren Fleury, March 2, 1995 vs. Canucks |
