= Matt Pelech =

Canadian ice hockey player (born 1987)

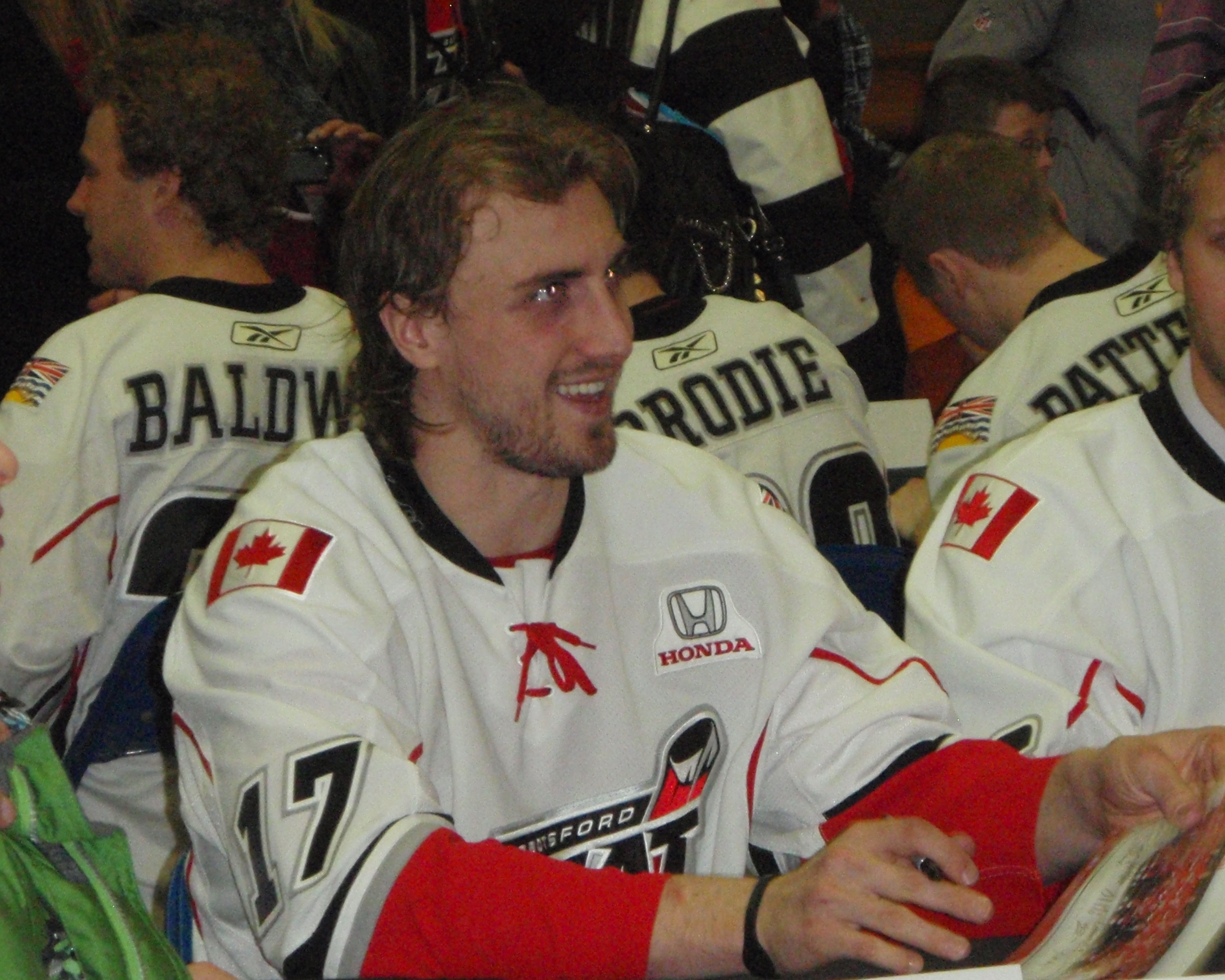
- Born: September 4, 1987 (age 38) Toronto, Ontario, Canada
- Height: 6 ft 4 in (193 cm)
- Weight: 230 lb (104 kg; 16 st 6 lb)
- Position: Defence/forward
- Shoots: Right
- EIHL team Former teams: Belfast Giants; Calgary Flames; San Jose Sharks; Schwenninger Wild Wings; Graz 99ers ERC Ingolstadt; EC VSV
- NHL draft: 26th overall, 2005; Calgary Flames
- Playing career: 2007–present

Matt Pelech (born September 4, 1987) is a Canadian professional ice hockey defenceman and forward who last played for and captained the Belfast Giants of the Elite Ice Hockey League (EIHL). He formerly played with the Calgary Flames and the San Jose Sharks of the National Hockey League (NHL). Pelech was a draft pick of the Flames, selected in the first round, 26th overall in the 2005 NHL entry draft and made his NHL debut in 2009 as a defenceman with the Flames. He has since switched to right wing and become known as an enforcer. His brothers, Michael Pelech and Adam Pelech, also play professionally.

== Playing career ==
As a youth, Pelech played in the 2001 Quebec International Pee-Wee Hockey Tournament with a minor ice hockey team from Vaughan.

Pelech played four seasons in the Ontario Hockey League with the Sarnia Sting, London Knights and Belleville Bulls. In 2007, he was assigned to the Quad City Flames of the American Hockey League. He was recalled by the Flames on April 4, 2009, making his NHL debut that night against the Minnesota Wild. Pelech recorded his first career point, an assist, three nights later against the Los Angeles Kings. He joined the Abbotsford Heat for the 2009–10 season when the Flames relocated their AHL team. He was sidelined in January 2010 with a blood clot in his arm, an ailment team doctors initially feared was season ending. Pelech recovered in time to join the Heat for their playoff run, appearing in all 13 of the team's post-season games.

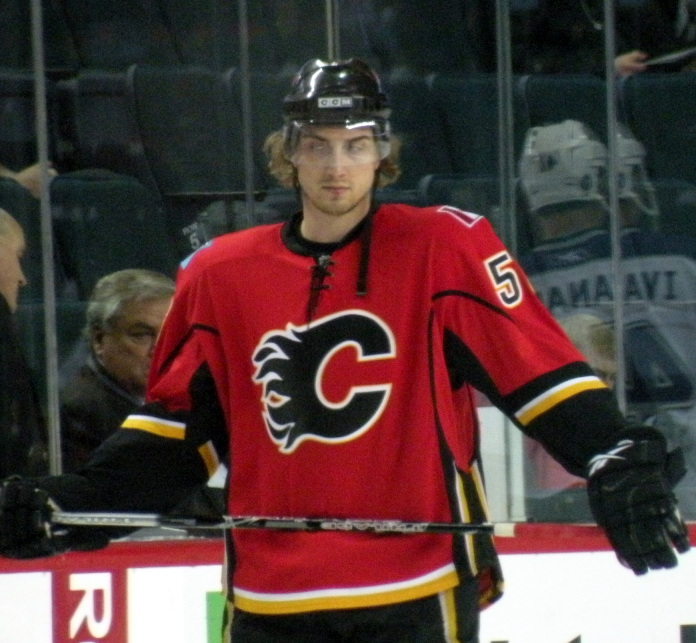
Pelech during his tenure with the Flames.

Pelech appeared in 59 games for the Heat in 2010–11, scoring 3 goals, 2 assists and adding 198 penalties in minutes (PIM). The Flames chose not to offer Pelech a new contract following the season, making him an unrestricted free agent. Pelech signed with the San Jose Sharks, spending the season with their AHL affiliate, the Worcester Sharks. He appeared in 59 games during the 2011–12 AHL season, where he scored eight points and had 168 PIM. He was an alternate captain in Worcester, and was voted the team's "unsung hero". Pelech, who was moved to the right wing and developed into an enforcer role in the Sharks organization, returned to Worcester for the 2012–13 season where he recorded seven points in 58 games and added a career-high 238 PIM. He also appeared in two games with San Jose.

The Sharks again re-signed Pelech to a one-year contract prior to the 2013–14 NHL season. Following a training camp in which he worked to prove he could be more than just a fighter, Pelech was initially assigned to the San Francisco Bulls of the ECHL, but was recalled to San Jose for the season opening game when the Sharks' coaching staff felt the team required a greater physical presence. He scored his first NHL goal – the game winner – against goaltender Roberto Luongo in a 4–1 victory over the Vancouver Canucks on October 10, 2013.

On May 13, 2015, Pelech agreed to a one-year contract with German outfit, Schwenninger Wild Wings of the DEL. He made 49 appearances in his sole season with the Wild Wings, tallying eight goals and twelve assists. In April 2016, Pelech inked a two-year deal with fellow DEL team Hamburg Freezers. However, the Freezers folded the following month. In September 2016, he signed with the Graz 99ers of the Austrian Hockey League,

After one season in Austria, Pelech moved back to Germany for the 2017–18 season as he signed a one-year deal with ERC Ingolstadt on May 23, 2017. On July 10, 2019, Pelech moved to the United Kingdom's Elite Ice Hockey League, signing for defending league champions the Belfast Giants whom he captained.

== Personal ==
Pelech's younger brother Michael (born 1989) plays in the ECHL for the Indy Fuel, while brother Adam (born 1994) plays in the NHL. They are nephews of former Vancouver Canucks general manager and NHL player Mike Gillis.

== Career statistics ==
			Regular season					Playoffs
Season	Team	League	GP	G	A	Pts	PIM	GP	G	A	Pts	PIM
2003–04	Sarnia Sting	OHL	62	4	6	10	39	5	0	1	1	12
2004–05	Sarnia Sting	OHL	31	1	5	6	74	—	—	—	—	—
2005–06	Sarnia Sting	OHL	18	0	2	2	59	—	—	—	—	—
2005–06	London Knights	OHL	34	1	7	8	80	19	0	0	0	48
2006–07	Belleville Bulls	OHL	58	5	30	35	171	12	0	3	3	22
2007–08	Quad City Flames	AHL	77	3	6	9	141	—	—	—	—	—
2008–09	Quad City Flames	AHL	59	3	6	9	130	—	—	—	—	—
2008–09	Calgary Flames	NHL	5	0	3	3	9	—	—	—	—	—
2009–10	Abbotsford Heat	AHL	42	2	8	10	125	13	0	4	4	31
2010–11	Abbotsford Heat	AHL	59	3	2	5	198	—	—	—	—	—
2011–12	Worcester Sharks	AHL	59	1	7	8	168	—	—	—	—	—
2012–13	Worcester Sharks	AHL	58	3	4	7	238	—	—	—	—	—
2012–13	San Jose Sharks	NHL	2	0	0	0	7	—	—	—	—	—
2013–14	San Jose Sharks	NHL	6	1	0	1	22	—	—	—	—	—
2013–14	Worcester Sharks	AHL	32	3	1	4	73	—	—	—	—	—
2014–15	Utah Grizzlies	ECHL	15	2	9	11	44	11	1	4	5	53
2014–15	Rochester Americans	AHL	39	0	2	2	80	—	—	—	—	—
2015–16	Schwenninger Wild Wings	DEL	49	8	12	20	102	—	—	—	—	—
2016–17	Graz 99ers	EBEL	48	4	10	14	139	5	0	3	3	8
2017–18	ERC Ingolstadt	DEL	50	1	8	9	116	5	0	1	1	2
2018–19	EC VSV	EBEL	40	2	12	14	118	—	—	—	—	—
2019–20	Belfast Giants	EIHL	45	4	8	12	123	—	—	—	—	—
AHL totals			425	18	36	54	1153	13	0	4	4	31
NHL totals			13	1	3	4	38	—	—	—	—	—

Awards and achievements
Preceded by Kris Chucko	Calgary Flames' first-round draft pick 2005	Succeeded by Leland Irving
