= Curtis McElhinney =

Canadian ice hockey player (born 1983)

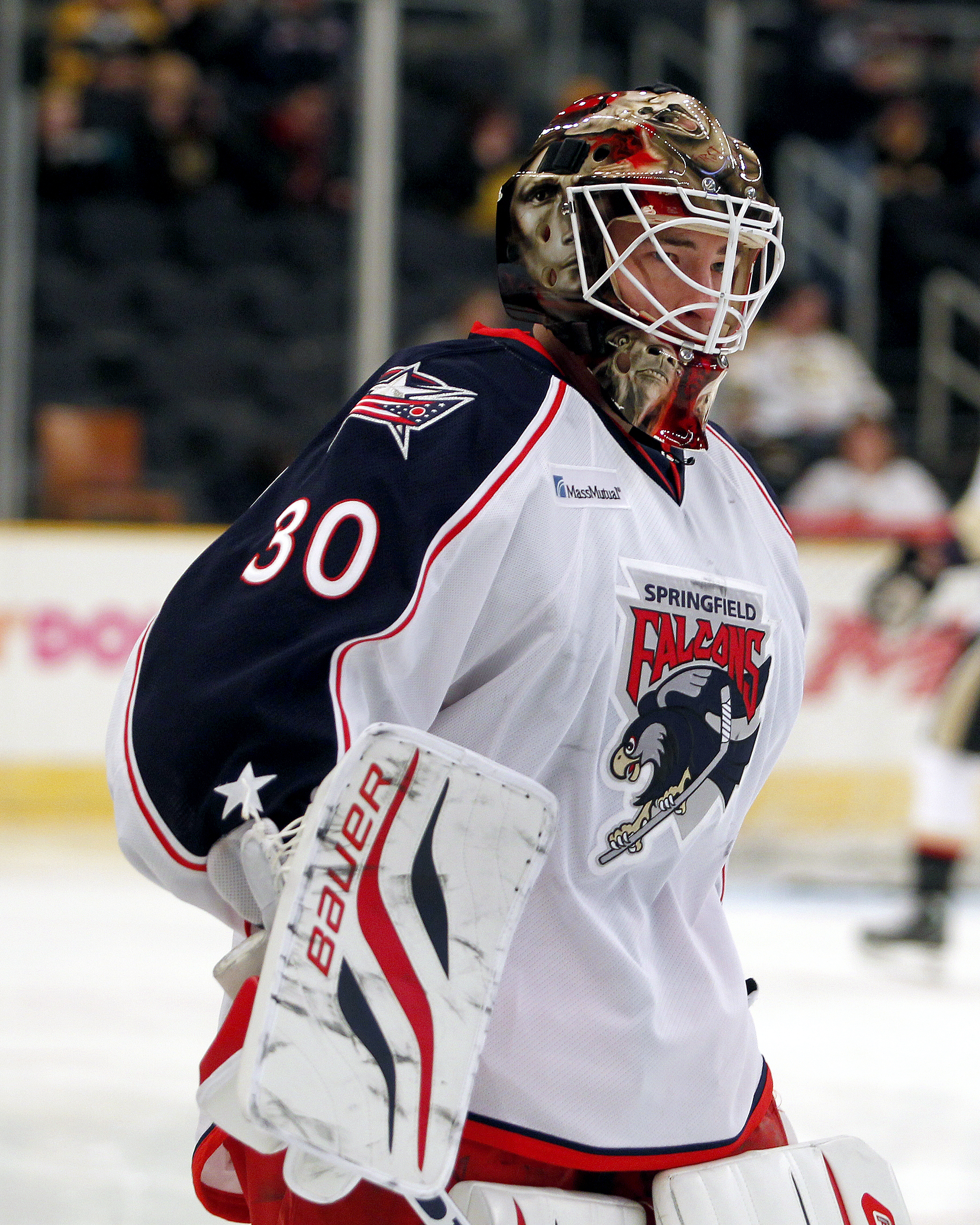
- McElhinney with the Springfield Falcons in 2013
- Born: May 23, 1983 (age 43) London, Ontario, Canada
- Height: 6 ft 3 in (191 cm)
- Weight: 200 lb (91 kg; 14 st 4 lb)
- Position: Goaltender
- Caught: Left
- Played for: Calgary Flames; Anaheim Ducks; Ottawa Senators; Phoenix Coyotes; Columbus Blue Jackets; Toronto Maple Leafs; Carolina Hurricanes; Tampa Bay Lightning
- National team: Canada
- NHL draft: 176th overall, 2002; Calgary Flames
- Playing career: 2005–2021

Robert Curtis McElhinney (born May 23, 1983) is a Canadian former professional ice hockey goaltender. He previously played in the NHL with the Calgary Flames, Anaheim Ducks, Ottawa Senators, Phoenix Coyotes, Columbus Blue Jackets, Toronto Maple Leafs, Carolina Hurricanes and Tampa Bay Lightning. McElhinney was drafted in the sixth-round of the 2002 NHL entry draft by the Flames, and won back-to-back Stanley Cups with the Lightning in 2020 and 2021.

== Playing career ==
=== Early years ===
McElhinney played four years of university hockey for Colorado College, compiling a 62–15–8 record in that time en route to winning two Western Collegiate Hockey Association First All-Star Team selections in 2003 and 2005, as well as NCAA Second and First All-American Team selections in 2003 and 2005, respectively. He was selected 176th overall by the Calgary Flames in the 2002 NHL entry draft.

He made his professional debut in 2005–06 with the Omaha Ak-Sar-Ben Knights of the American Hockey League (AHL). He tied for the AHL lead in shutouts in 2006–07 while setting an Omaha team record with 44 wins. He played in the 2007 AHL All-Star game, and was named to the AHL Second All-Star Team.

McElhinney split 2007–08 between the Quad City Flames and Calgary. He made his NHL debut on October 22, 2007 against the San Jose Sharks in relief of Miikka Kiprusoff, appearing in five NHL games, finishing with a 0–2–0 record and a 2.00 goals against average. He played the entire 2008–09 NHL season with Calgary as Kiprusoff's backup and recorded his first NHL win in his 14th game of the year, the last of the regular season, in a 4–1 victory over the Edmonton Oilers on April 11, 2009.

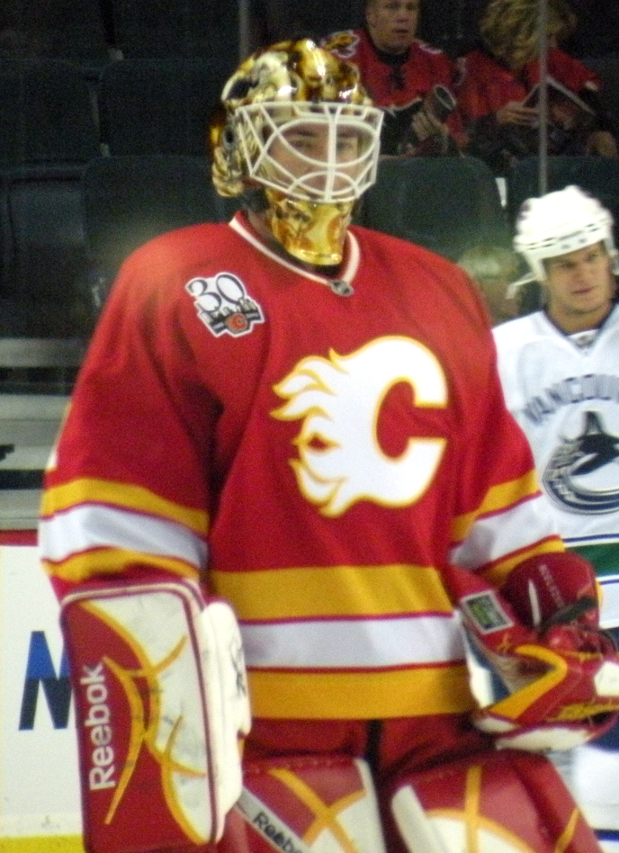
McElhinney with the Calgary Flames during the 2009–10 season. He was drafted by the Flames in 2002.

The Flames signed McElhinney to a two-year contract prior to the 2009–10 season. He was traded to the Anaheim Ducks on March 3, 2010 in exchange for goalie Vesa Toskala.

On February 24, 2011 McElhinney was traded to the Tampa Bay Lightning for Dan Ellis. On February 28, he was claimed off waivers by the Ottawa Senators.

McElhinney signed a one-year, two-way contract with the Phoenix Coyotes on July 4, 2011.

On February 22, 2012 McElhinney was traded to the Columbus Blue Jackets (along with second round pick in the 2012 NHL Entry Draft (via Ottawa) and a conditional fifth round selection in the 2013 Draft) for Antoine Vermette. He spent the season with Columbus' AHL affiliate Springfield Falcons and had a fine season, posting nine shutouts to lead the league and set a franchise record for both single season and career shutouts, and was again named to the AHL Second All-Star Team.

He was placed on waivers by the Columbus Blue Jackets January 8, 2017, after allowing four straight goals in a 5–4 loss to the New York Rangers on January 7, 2017. He posted a 2–1–2 record and a .924 save percentage in seven games with the team in the 2016–2017 season. One day after being waived, McElhinney was claimed by the Toronto Maple Leafs, who were in need of a backup goaltender following a disappointing season by Jhonas Enroth.

Down the stretch, McElhinney went 6–7 with one shutout, a 2.85 GAA and a .914 save percentage. As starter Frederik Andersen went down with an injury, McElhinney received quite a few extra starts. Most importantly in the second last game of the season for the Leafs with a playoff spot on the line. In this game, McElhinney made arguably the biggest save of his career in the dying seconds on Pittsburgh Penguins captain Sidney Crosby who seemingly had a wide-open net for a one-timer goal. McElhinney slid across the crease to make a pad save and preserved the lead that eventually held up to earn the Leafs a playoff berth.

=== Later career and retirement ===
Prior to the 2018–19 season, on October 1, 2018, the Maple Leafs placed McElhinney on waivers after Garret Sparks won the backup goaltending job in the pre-season. His two-year tenure with the Maple Leafs ended as he was claimed by the Carolina Hurricanes the following day, in order to add depth after an injury to Scott Darling. McElhinney would go on to split most of the 2018–19 season in goal with Petr Mrázek.

On May 1, 2019, McElhinney started for the Carolina Hurricanes in game three of the Stanley Cup playoffs versus the New York Islanders in round two making him the oldest goaltender to make his first career playoff start at 35 years and 343 days of age. On May 3, 2019, in game four, he helped to secure the franchise's first ever 4–0 sweep in the best-of-seven series.

On July 1, 2019, McElhinney signed a two-year contract with the Tampa Bay Lightning. He won the Stanley Cup in 2020 and 2021, spending his final two seasons with the team as the backup to Andrei Vasilevskiy.

On September 25, 2021, McElhinney announced his retirement via Instagram.

On October 9th, 2023 he became the Toronto Maple Leafs Director of Goaltending Development and Scouting.

He has written a book about goaltending mindset called "The Crease Mindset" and has a goaltender mentorship program called Peak Performance Goaltending.

== International play ==
Following the Leafs first round defeat by the Boston Bruins in the 2018 Stanley Cup playoffs, McElhinney was named to Team Canada to compete at the 2018 IIHF World Championship.

== Personal life ==
McElhinney and his wife Ashleigh have one son and one daughter. McElhinney has a younger sister, Alana, who played goaltender for the Division I Bemidji State University's women's hockey team, and a brother Spencer who was a forward in the Alberta Junior Hockey League (AJHL).

== Career statistics ==
=== Regular season and playoffs ===
			Regular season										Playoffs
Season	Team	League	GP	W	L	T	OTL	MIN	GA	SO	GAA	SV%	GP	W	L	MIN	GA	SO	GAA	SV%
2001–02	Colorado College	WCHA	9	6	0	1	—	441	15	1	2.04	.918	—	—	—	—	—	—	—	—
2002–03	Colorado College	WCHA	37	25	6	5	—	2147	85	4	2.37	.906	—	—	—	—	—	—	—	—
2003–04	Colorado College	WCHA	19	10	6	1	—	1015	41	2	2.42	.906	—	—	—	—	—	—	—	—
2004–05	Colorado College	WCHA	25	21	3	1	—	1490	52	2	2.09	.927	—	—	—	—	—	—	—	—
2005–06	Omaha Ak-Sar-Ben Knights	AHL	33	9	14	—	2	1619	68	3	2.52	.912	—	—	—	—	—	—	—	—
2006–07	Omaha Ak-Sar-Ben Knights	AHL	57	35	17	—	1	3181	113	7	2.13	.917	5	2	3	311	11	0	2.12	.914
2007–08	Calgary Flames	NHL	5	0	2	—	0	149	5	0	2.00	.902	—	—	—	—	—	—	—	—
2007–08	Quad City Flames	AHL	41	20	18	—	2	2320	88	3	2.28	.911	—	—	—	—	—	—	—	—
2008–09	Calgary Flames	NHL	14	1	7	—	0	518	31	0	3.59	.889	1	0	0	34	1	0	1.76	.900
2009–10	Calgary Flames	NHL	10	3	4	—	0	502	27	0	3.22	.885	—	—	—	—	—	—	—	—
2009–10	Anaheim Ducks	NHL	10	5	1	—	2	521	24	0	2.76	.917	—	—	—	—	—	—	—	—
2010–11	Anaheim Ducks	NHL	21	6	9	—	1	996	57	2	3.43	.890	—	—	—	—	—	—	—	—
2010–11	Ottawa Senators	NHL	7	3	4	—	0	399	17	0	2.56	.917	—	—	—	—	—	—	—	—
2011–12	Phoenix Coyotes	NHL	2	1	0	—	0	72	2	0	1.67	.944	—	—	—	—	—	—	—	—
2011–12	Portland Pirates	AHL	25	10	13	—	0	1379	70	0	3.04	.907	—	—	—	—	—	—	—	—
2012–13	Springfield Falcons	AHL	49	29	16	—	3	1349	113	9	2.32	.923	8	3	5	483	25	0	3.10	.895
2013–14	Columbus Blue Jackets	NHL	28	10	11	—	1	1423	64	2	2.70	.909	—	—	—	—	—	—	—	—
2014–15	Columbus Blue Jackets	NHL	32	12	14	—	2	1710	82	0	2.88	.914	—	—	—	—	—	—	—	—
2015–16	Columbus Blue Jackets	NHL	18	2	7	—	3	836	46	0	3.31	.890	—	—	—	—	—	—	—	—
2016–17	Columbus Blue Jackets	NHL	7	2	1	—	2	376	15	0	2.39	.924	—	—	—	—	—	—	—	—
2016–17	Toronto Maple Leafs	NHL	14	6	7	—	0	759	36	1	2.85	.914	—	—	—	—	—	—	—	—
2017–18	Toronto Maple Leafs	NHL	18	11	5	—	1	980	35	3	2.14	.934	1	0	1	48	4	0	5.07	.826
2018–19	Carolina Hurricanes	NHL	33	20	11	—	2	1978	85	2	2.58	.912	5	3	2	268	9	0	2.01	.930
2019–20	Tampa Bay Lightning	NHL	18	8	7	—	3	1081	52	1	2.89	.906	—	—	—	—	—	—	—	—
2020–21	Tampa Bay Lightning	NHL	12	4	6	—	2	720	37	1	3.09	.875	—	—	—	—	—	—	—	—
NHL totals			249	94	95	—	20	13,019	615	12	2.83	.907	7	3	3	350	14	0	2.30	.921

=== International ===
Year	Team	Event	GP	W	L	T	MIN	GA	SO	GAA	SV%
2018	Canada	WC	5	3	2	0	245	6	1	2.02	.936
Senior totals			5	3	2	0	245	6	1	2.02	.936

== Awards and honours ==
Award	Year
College
WCHA First All-Star Team	2002–03; 2004–05
AHCA West Second-Team All-American	2002–03
AHCA West First-Team All-American	2004–05
WCHA All-Tournament Team	2005
AHL
Second All-Star Team	2006–07
NHL
Stanley Cup champion	2020, 2021
