= Kris Chucko =

Canadian ice hockey player (born 1986)

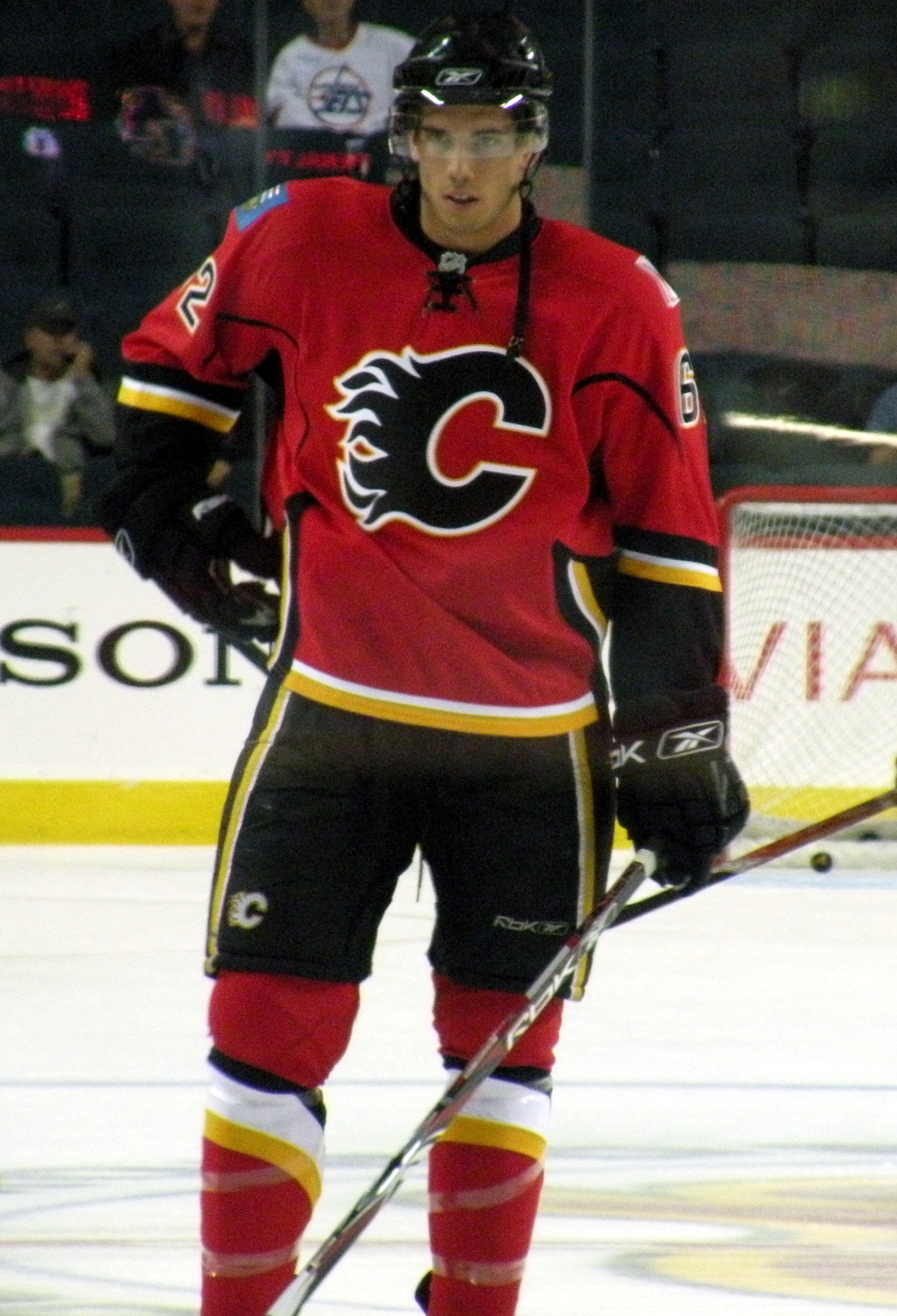
- Born: March 13, 1986 (age 40) Burnaby, British Columbia, Canada
- Height: 6 ft 2 in (188 cm)
- Weight: 190 lb (86 kg; 13 st 8 lb)
- Position: Right wing
- Shot: Right
- Played for: Calgary Flames
- NHL draft: 24th overall, 2004; Calgary Flames
- Playing career: 2006–2011

Kristopher J. Chucko (born March 13, 1986) is a Canadian former ice hockey player who played two National Hockey League (NHL) games for the Calgary Flames. He was a first-round selection, 24th overall, of the Flames in the 2004 NHL entry draft and played his entire professional career in the team's organization. Chucko retired in 2011 as a result of concussions.

== Playing career ==
As a youth, Chucko played in the 2000 Quebec International Pee-Wee Hockey Tournament with a minor ice hockey team from Burnaby.

Chucko was drafted after scoring 87 points in 53 games for the Salmon Arm Silverbacks of the British Columbia Hockey League. He then moved on to the University of Minnesota, where he spent two years (2004–2006).

He signed with the Flames on May 22, 2006. He was later assigned to the Flames AHL farm club, the Omaha Ak-Sar-Ben Knights, where he made his professional debut. Chucko was recalled by the Flames on March 5, 2009, and made his NHL debut that night against the Philadelphia Flyers. He appeared in two games total before being returned to Omaha. He remained in the Flames system in 2009–10, joining the team's new AHL affiliate, the Abbotsford Heat. His season ended just after Christmas when he suffered a severe concussion during a game. The Flames re-signed Chucko to a one-year contract for the 2010-11 season.

Chucko suffered another serious concussion in October 2010, exacerbating a neck injury and limiting him to just two games for the Heat in 2010–11. Following the season, he decided to retire as a player.

== Career statistics ==
			Regular season					Playoffs
Season	Team	League	GP	G	A	Pts	PIM	GP	G	A	Pts	PIM
2002–03	Salmon Arm Silverbacks	BCHL	59	14	19	33	80	11	5	3	8	12
2003–04	Salmon Arm Silverbacks	BCHL	53	32	55	87	161	14	10	10	20	36
2004–05	Minnesota Golden Gophers	WCHA	43	10	11	21	59	—	—	—	—	—
2005–06	Minnesota Golden Gophers	WCHA	33	4	9	13	40	—	—	—	—	—
2006–07	Omaha Ak–Sar–Ben Knights	AHL	80	14	14	28	72	6	0	0	0	2
2007–08	Quad City Flames	AHL	80	15	15	30	38	—	—	—	—	—
2008–09	Quad City Flames	AHL	74	28	23	51	59	—	—	—	—	—
2008–09	Calgary Flames	NHL	2	0	0	0	2	—	—	—	—	—
2009–10	Abbotsford Heat	AHL	41	9	9	18	56	—	—	—	—	—
2010–11	Abbotsford Heat	AHL	2	0	0	0	2	—	—	—	—	—
AHL totals			277	66	61	127	227	6	0	0	0	2
NHL totals			2	0	0	0	2	—	—	—	—	—

Awards and achievements
Preceded by Dion Phaneuf	Calgary Flames' first-round draft pick 2004	Succeeded by Matt Pelech
