= Quad City Flames =

- City: Moline, Illinois
- League: American Hockey League
- Founded: 1977
- Operated: 2007–2009
- Home arena: iWireless Center
- Colors: Red, black, gold, white
- Affiliates: Calgary Flames

Franchise history
- 1977–1987: Maine Mariners
- 1987–1993: Utica Devils
- 1993–2003: Saint John Flames
- 2005–2007: Omaha Ak-Sar-Ben Knights
- 2007–2009: Quad City Flames
- 2009–2014: Abbotsford Heat
- 2014–2015: Adirondack Flames
- 2015–2022: Stockton Heat
- 2022–Present: Calgary Wranglers

The Quad City Flames was an American professional ice hockey team that played in the American Hockey League from 2007 to 2009. They were owned by QC Sports Ventures Inc., an ownership group based in the Quad Cities. The Flames played at the iWireless Center in Moline, Illinois, serving as the top minor league affiliate of the National Hockey League's Calgary Flames. The move to the Quad Cities was confirmed on May 24, 2007. As a result, the arena's previous hockey tenant, the Quad City Mallards of the United Hockey League ceased operations.

The team left the Quad Cities after the 2008–09 season and relocated to Abbotsford, British Columbia to play as the Abbotsford Heat in the 2009–10 season.

== History ==
The Flames AHL franchise relocated from Omaha, Nebraska, where the team spent two seasons as the Omaha Ak-Sar-Ben Knights. Following two disappointing seasons at the gate in which the Flames and the Knights of Ak-Sar-Ben lost over $4 million, the Flames chose to relocate the franchise. The new franchise joined former UHL rival, the Rockford IceHogs in moving up to the AHL. The Flames made their AHL regular-season debut in Moline on October 6, 2007, with a 5–1 victory over Rockford.

The Flames were the third team to attempt to place an AHL team in the Quad Cities. Both the San Jose Sharks and Edmonton Oilers were unable to reach an agreement with the owners of the Mallards and of the arena. While the NHL franchise had signed an affiliation agreement to the end of the 2011–12 season, the Flames and Quad City Sports Ventures agreed to end the agreement after just two seasons and the Flames placed their affiliate in Abbotsford, British Columbia for the 2009–10 AHL season. Local ownership in Quad Cities estimated the team's losses for 2008–09 at $1.3 million.

This market was previously served by:

- Quad City Mallards of the UHL (1995–2007)

The market was subsequently home to:

- Quad City Mallards of the IHL, CHL, and the ECHL (2009–18)

Affiliates

- Calgary Flames (2007–2009)

== Season-by-season results ==
=== Regular season ===
Season	Games	Won	Lost	OTL	SOL	Points	Goals For	Goals Against	Standing
2007–08	80	38	32	3	7	86	203	214	6th, West Division
2008–09	80	36	31	6	7	85	212	216	5th, West Division

=== Playoffs ===
Season	1st round	2nd round	3rd round	Finals
2007–08	Out of playoffs.			
2008–09	Out of playoffs.			

== Team records ==
=== Single season ===
Goals: 39 (Canada) Kyle Greentree (2008–09)
Assists: 43 (Canada) Grant Stevenson (2007–08)
Points: 76 (Canada) Kyle Greentree (2008–09)
Penalty Minutes: 248 (Canada) Brandon Prust (2007–08)
GAA: 2.23 (Canada) Leland Irving (2008–09)
SV%: .912 (Canada) Matt Keetley (2007–08), Leland Irving (2008–09)
Wins: 24 (Canada) Leland Irving (2008–09)
Shutouts: 3 (Canada) Curtis McElhinney (2007–08)

- Goaltending records need a minimum of 25 games played by the goaltender

=== Career ===
Career Goals: 43 (Canada) Kris Chucko
Career Assists: 76 (Canada) Carsen Germyn
Career Points: 108 (Canada) Carsen Germyn
Career Penalty Minutes: 271 (Canada) Matt Pelech
Career Goaltending Wins: 24 (Canada) Leland Irving
Career Shutouts: 3 (Canada) Curtis McElhinney (Canada) Matt Keetley
Career Games: 154 (Canada) Kris Chucko
