= 2008–09 Vancouver Canucks season =

NHL hockey team season

2008–09 Vancouver Canucks
- Northwest Division champions
- Division: 1st Northwest
- Conference: 3rd Western
- 2008–09 record: 45–27–10
- Home record: 24–12–5
- Road record: 21–15–5
- Goals for: 246
- Goals against: 220

Team information
- General manager: Mike Gillis
- Coach: Alain Vigneault
- Captain: Roberto Luongo
- Alternate captains: Ryan Kesler; Willie Mitchell; Mattias Ohlund
- Arena: General Motors Place
- Average attendance: 18,630 (101.1%)
- Minor league affiliates: Manitoba Moose (AHL); Victoria Salmon Kings (ECHL)

Team leaders
- Goals: Daniel Sedin (31)
- Assists: Henrik Sedin (60)
- Points: Daniel Sedin (82); Henrik Sedin (82)
- Penalty minutes: Shane O'Brien (196)
- Plus/minus: Willie Mitchell (+29)
- Wins: Roberto Luongo (33)
- Goals against average: Roberto Luongo (2.34)

The 2008–09 Vancouver Canucks season was the 39th season in the National Hockey League (NHL).

== Season events ==
=== Off-season ===
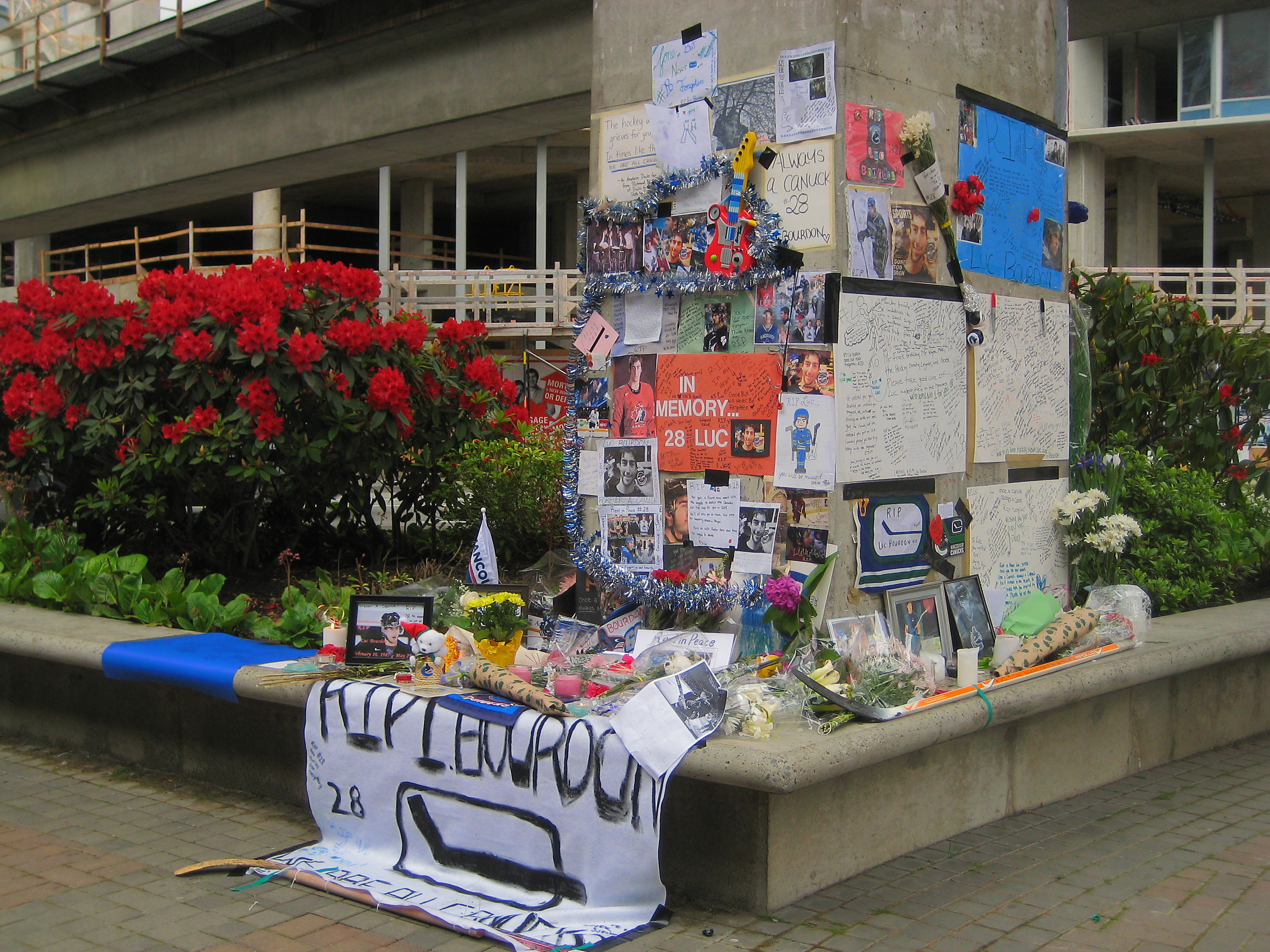
A collection of items at a makeshift Luc Bourdon memorial outside General Motors Place.

On June 17, 2008, the Canucks named Ryan Walter as an assistant coach. He joined head coach Alain Vigneault and assistant coach Rick Bowness on the Canucks' coaching staff. Walter, 50, played in 1,003 NHL games over 15 seasons with Washington, Montreal, and Vancouver, scoring 264 goals and 382 assists. He won the Stanley Cup with Montreal in 1986. A native of New Westminster, British Columbia, Walter was the second overall pick by the Washington Capitals in the 1978 NHL amateur draft.

The Canucks lost two key veterans to free agency. Markus Naslund, the Canucks' captain for the previous seven seasons, signed a two-year, $8 million contract with the New York Rangers, while Pitt Meadows native Brendan Morrison signed a one-year, $2.75 million contract with the Anaheim Ducks.

The Canucks also lost a promising young defenceman, Luc Bourdon, who died in a motorcycle accident in his hometown of Shippagan, New Brunswick. The Canucks honoured Bourdon with a tribute in the season opener, October 9, against the Calgary Flames.

Among the Canucks' roster additions was Steve Bernier, who was acquired from the Buffalo Sabres for a second- and third-round draft pick, and Pavol Demitra, who signed a two-year, $8 million contract.

The Canucks announced on September 4, 2008, that they would honour Trevor Linden in a pre-game ceremony on December 17, 2008 before a game against the Edmonton Oilers. His jersey number, 16, was retired by the team, joining former captain Stan Smyl as the second Canuck to have his number retired.

=== Pre-season ===
The Canucks' 2008 pre-season began on September 12 with the opening of their annual prospects training camp. The camp consisted of 22 players and was held in Vancouver, British Columbia at both General Motors Place and the University of British Columbia campus, as well as in Camrose, Alberta. The prospect camp was then followed by the main training camp, held over two days beginning September 20 in Whistler, British Columbia.

On September 30, 2008, the Canucks named Roberto Luongo as the twelfth captain in team history, with Luongo becoming only the seventh goaltender in NHL history to be named team captain. NHL rules prevent goaltenders from physically wearing the captain's letter "C", however, they do not prevent goaltenders from being named captain. The Canucks also named Willie Mitchell, Mattias Ohlund, and Ryan Kesler as alternate captains. Mitchell assumed the duties of dealing with officials during games, while Ohlund took faceoffs and performed other ceremonial duties.

2008 Pre-season Game Log: 6–0–1 (Home: 3–0–1; Road: 3–0–0)
| # | Date | Visitor | Score | Home | OT | Decision | Attendance | Record | Recap |
| 1 | September 22 | Vancouver | 4–3 | Edmonton | SO | Schneider | 16,839 | 1–0–0 |
| 2 | September 23 | Edmonton | 1–2 | Vancouver | | Luongo | 18,630 | 2–0–0 |
| 3 | September 27 | Vancouver | 3–2 | San Jose | | Luongo | 16,721 | 3–0–0 |
| 4 | September 28 | Vancouver | 5–4 | Anaheim | SO | Sanford | 16,481 | 4–0–0 |
| 5 | October 1 | Calgary | 1–6 | Vancouver | | Luongo | 18,630 | 5–0–0 |
| 6 | October 2 | San Jose | 2–3 | Vancouver | | Sanford | 18,630 | 6–0–0 |
| 7 | October 5 | Anaheim | 4–3 | Vancouver | OT | Luongo | 18,630 | 6–0–1 |

== Standings ==
=== Divisional standings ===
Northwest Division
| | | GP | W | L | OTL | GF | GA | Pts |
|---|---|---|---|---|---|---|---|---|
| **1** | **y – Vancouver Canucks** | **82** | **45** | **27** | **10** | **246** | **220** | **100** |
| **2** | **Calgary Flames** | **82** | **46** | **30** | **6** | **254** | **248** | **98** |
| 3 | Minnesota Wild | 82 | 40 | 33 | 9 | 219 | 200 | **89** |
| 4 | Edmonton Oilers | 82 | 38 | 35 | 9 | 234 | 248 | **85** |
| 5 | Colorado Avalanche | 82 | 32 | 45 | 5 | 199 | 257 | **69** |

=== Conference standings ===
Western Conference
| R | | Div | GP | W | L | OTL | GF | GA | Pts |
|---|---|---|---|---|---|---|---|---|---|
| **1** | **p – San Jose Sharks** | **PA** | **82** | **53** | **18** | **11** | **257** | **204** | 117 |
| **2** | **y – Detroit Red Wings** | **CE** | **82** | **51** | **21** | **10** | **295** | **244** | 112 |
| **3** | **y – Vancouver Canucks** | **NW** | **82** | **45** | **27** | **10** | **246** | **220** | 100 |
| **4** | **Chicago Blackhawks** | **CE** | **82** | **46** | **24** | **12** | **264** | **216** | 104 |
| **5** | **Calgary Flames** | **NW** | **82** | **46** | **30** | **6** | **254** | **248** | 98 |
| **6** | **St. Louis Blues** | **CE** | **82** | **41** | **31** | **10** | **233** | **233** | 92 |
| **7** | **Columbus Blue Jackets** | **CE** | **82** | **41** | **31** | **10** | **226** | **230** | 92 |
| **8** | **Anaheim Ducks** | **PA** | **82** | **42** | **33** | **7** | **245** | **238** | 91 |
8.5
| 9 | Minnesota Wild | NW | 82 | 40 | 33 | 9 | 219 | 200 | 89 |
| 10 | Nashville Predators | CE | 82 | 40 | 34 | 8 | 213 | 233 | 88 |
| 11 | Edmonton Oilers | NW | 82 | 38 | 35 | 9 | 234 | 248 | 85 |
| 12 | Dallas Stars | PA | 82 | 36 | 35 | 11 | 230 | 257 | 83 |
| 13 | Phoenix Coyotes | PA | 82 | 36 | 39 | 7 | 208 | 252 | 79 |
| 14 | Los Angeles Kings | PA | 82 | 34 | 37 | 11 | 207 | 234 | 79 |
| 15 | Colorado Avalanche | NW | 82 | 32 | 45 | 5 | 199 | 257 | 69 |

bold – qualified for playoffs, y – division winner, p – Presidents' Trophy winner
CE – Central Division, NW – Northwest Division, PA – Pacific Division

== Schedule and results ==
=== Regular season ===
2008–09 Game log

October: 6–5–0 (Home: 2–1–0; Road: 4–4–0)
| # | Date | Visitor | Score | Home | OT | Decision | Attendance | Record | Pts | Recap |
|---|---|---|---|---|---|---|---|---|---|---|
| 1 | October 9 | Calgary | 0–6 | Vancouver | | Luongo | 18,630 | 1–0–0 | 2 |
| 2 | October 11 | Vancouver | 5–4 | Calgary | OT | Luongo | 19,289 | 2–0–0 | 4 |
| 3 | October 13 | Vancouver | 1–5 | Washington | | Luongo | 16,847 | 2–1–0 | 4 |
| 4 | October 16 | Vancouver | 4–3 | Detroit | OT | Luongo | 19,011 | 3–1–0 | 6 |
| 5 | October 17 | Vancouver | 2–5 | Buffalo | | Sanford | 18,449 | 3–2–0 | 6 |
| 6 | October 19 | Vancouver | 2–4 | Chicago | | Luongo | 21,193 | 3–3–0 | 6 |
| 7 | October 21 | Vancouver | 2–4 | Columbus | | Luongo | 12,057 | 3–4–0 | 6 |
| 8 | October 25 | Edmonton | 3–6 | Vancouver | | Luongo | 18,630 | 4–4–0 | 8 |
| 9 | October 28 | Boston | 1–0 | Vancouver | | Luongo | 18,630 | 4–5–0 | 8 |
| 10 | October 30 | Vancouver | 4–0 | Los Angeles | | Luongo | 13,652 | 5–5–0 | 10 |
| 11 | October 31 | Vancouver | 7–6 | Anaheim | SO | Luongo | 16,704 | 6–5–0 | 12 |

November: 8–3–2 (Home: 5–2–1; Road: 3–1–1)
| # | Date | Visitor | Score | Home | OT | Decision | Attendance | Record | Pts | Recap |
|---|---|---|---|---|---|---|---|---|---|---|
| 12 | November 2 | Detroit | 3–2 | Vancouver | | Luongo | 18,630 | 6–6–0 | 12 |
| 13 | November 4 | Nashville | 0–4 | Vancouver | | Luongo | 18,630 | 7–6–0 | 14 |
| 14 | November 6 | Phoenix | 0–1 | Vancouver | | Luongo | 18,630 | 8–6–0 | 16 |
| 15 | November 8 | Minnesota | 0–2 | Vancouver | | Luongo | 18,630 | 9–6–0 | 18 |
| 16 | November 12 | Colorado | 2–1 | Vancouver | SO | Luongo | 18,630 | 9–6–1 | 19 |
| 17 | November 15 | Toronto | 2–4 | Vancouver | | Luongo | 18,630 | 10–6–1 | 21 |
| 18 | November 17 | Vancouver | 1–2 | NY Islanders | SO | Luongo | 11,299 | 10–6–2 | 22 |
| 19 | November 19 | Vancouver | 6–3 | NY Rangers | | Luongo | 18,200 | 11–6–2 | 24 |
| 20 | November 20 | Vancouver | 3–2 | Minnesota | | Sanford | 18,568 | 12–6–2 | 26 |
| 21 | November 22 | Vancouver | 3–1 | Pittsburgh | | Sanford | 17,040 | 13–6–2 | 28 |
| 22 | November 24 | Detroit | 2–3 | Vancouver | OT | Sanford | 18,630 | 14–6–2 | 30 |
| 23 | November 27 | Calgary | 4–3 | Vancouver | | Sanford | 18,630 | 14–7–2 | 30 |
| 24 | November 29 | Vancouver | 1–3 | Calgary | | Schneider | 19,289 | 14–8–2 | 30 |

December: 6–7–1 (Home: 4–3–0; Road: 2–4–1)
| # | Date | Visitor | Score | Home | OT | Decision | Attendance | Record | Pts | Recap |
|---|---|---|---|---|---|---|---|---|---|---|
| 25 | December 1 | Vancouver | 2–3 | Columbus | | Schneider | 13,299 | 14–9–2 | 30 |
| 26 | December 4 | Vancouver | 5–6 | Detroit | | Sanford | 19,116 | 14–10–2 | 30 |
| 27 | December 5 | Vancouver | 2–1 | Minnesota | | Schneider | 18,568 | 15–10–2 | 32 |
| 28 | December 7 | Vancouver | 4–5 | Colorado | SO | Schneider | 13,411 | 15–10–3 | 33 |
| 29 | December 9 | Vancouver | 3–1 | Nashville | | Sanford | 12,441 | 16–10–3 | 35 |
| 30 | December 13 | Vancouver | 0–3 | Edmonton | | Sanford | 16,839 | 16–11–3 | 35 |
| 31 | December 14 | Florida | 3–5 | Vancouver | | Schneider | 18,630 | 17–11–3 | 37 |
| 32 | December 17 | Edmonton | 2–4 | Vancouver | | Sanford | 18,630 | 18–11–3 | 39 |
| 33 | December 20 | Chicago | 3–1 | Vancouver | | Sanford | 18,630 | 18–12–3 | 39 |
| 34 | December 22 | Anaheim | 3–4 | Vancouver | | Sanford | 18,630 | 19–12–3 | 41 |
| 35 | December 23 | Vancouver | 0–5 | San Jose | | Schneider | 17,496 | 19–13–3 | 41 |
| 36 | December 26 | Edmonton | 3–2 | Vancouver | | Sanford | 18,630 | 19–14–3 | 41 |
| 37 | December 28 | Ottawa | 0–3 | Vancouver | | Sanford | 18,630 | 20–14–3 | 43 |
| 38 | December 30 | Philadelphia | 3–2 | Vancouver | | Schneider | 18,630 | 20–15–3 | 43 |

January: 2–5–5 (Home: 0–5–3; Road: 2–0–2)
| # | Date | Visitor | Score | Home | OT | Decision | Attendance | Record | Pts | Recap |
|---|---|---|---|---|---|---|---|---|---|---|
| 39 | January 1 | Vancouver | 2–1 | Nashville | | LaBarbera | 16,502 | 21–15–3 | 45 |
| 40 | January 2 | Vancouver | 3–4 | Atlanta | SO | LaBarbera | 14,902 | 21–15–4 | 46 |
| 41 | January 4 | Dallas | 3–2 | Vancouver | SO | LaBarbera | 18,630 | 21–15–5 | 47 |
| 42 | January 7 | Vancouver | 4–2 | Edmonton | | LaBarbera | 16,839 | 22–15–5 | 49 |
| 43 | January 9 | St. Louis | 6–4 | Vancouver | | LaBarbera | 18,630 | 22–16–5 | 49 |
| 44 | January 10 | San Jose | 4–2 | Vancouver | | Sanford | 18,630 | 22–17–5 | 49 |
| 45 | January 13 | New Jersey | 5–3 | Vancouver | | Sanford | 18,630 | 22–18–5 | 49 |
| 46 | January 15 | Phoenix | 4–1 | Vancouver | | Luongo | 18,630 | 22–19–5 | 49 |
| 47 | January 18 | Columbus | 6–5 | Vancouver | SO | Luongo | 18,630 | 22–19–6 | 50 |
| 48 | January 20 | Vancouver | 1–2 | San Jose | OT | Luongo | 17,496 | 22–19–7 | 51 |
| 49 | January 28 | Nashville | 5–3 | Vancouver | | Luongo | 18,630 | 22–20–7 | 51 |
| 50 | January 31 | Minnesota | 4–3 | Vancouver | OT | Luongo | 18,630 | 22–20–8 | 52 |

February: 9–2–0 (Home: 4–0–0; Road: 5–2–0)
| # | Date | Visitor | Score | Home | OT | Decision | Attendance | Record | Pts | Recap |
|---|---|---|---|---|---|---|---|---|---|---|
| 51 | February 3 | Carolina | 3–4 | Vancouver | | Luongo | 18,630 | 23–20–8 | 54 |
| 52 | February 7 | Chicago | 3–7 | Vancouver | | Luongo | 18,630 | 24–20–8 | 56 |
| 53 | February 10 | Vancouver | 6–4 | St. Louis | | Luongo | 16,431 | 25–20–8 | 58 |
| 54 | February 12 | Vancouver | 4–3 | Phoenix | | Luongo | 14,872 | 26–20–8 | 60 |
| 55 | February 13 | Vancouver | 1–2 | Dallas | | LaBarbera | 18,532 | 26–21–8 | 60 |
| 56 | February 15 | Montreal | 2–4 | Vancouver | | Luongo | 18,630 | 27–21–8 | 62 |
| 57 | February 17 | Vancouver | 4–3 | Calgary | SO | Luongo | 19,289 | 28–21–8 | 64 |
| 58 | February 19 | Vancouver | 5–2 | Ottawa | | Luongo | 19,716 | 29–21–8 | 66 |
| 59 | February 21 | Vancouver | 3–2 | Toronto | SO | Luongo | 19,504 | 30–21–8 | 68 |
| 60 | February 24 | Vancouver | 0–3 | Montreal | | Luongo | 21,273 | 30–22–8 | 68 |
| 61 | February 27 | Tampa Bay | 1–2 | Vancouver | | Luongo | 18,630 | 31–22–8 | 70 |

March: 11–3–1 (Home: 7–0–0; Road: 4–3–1)
| # | Date | Visitor | Score | Home | OT | Decision | Attendance | Record | Pts | Recap |
|---|---|---|---|---|---|---|---|---|---|---|
| 62 | March 1 | Columbus | 1–3 | Vancouver | | Luongo | 18,630 | 32–22–8 | 72 |
| 63 | March 3 | Minnesota | 2–4 | Vancouver | | Luongo | 18,630 | 33–22–8 | 74 |
| 64 | March 7 | San Jose | 1–3 | Vancouver | | Luongo | 18,630 | 34–22–8 | 76 |
| 65 | March 9 | Vancouver | 2–3 | Los Angeles | | Luongo | 16,995 | 34–23–8 | 76 |
| 66 | March 11 | Vancouver | 3–4 | Anaheim | OT | Luongo | 16,967 | 34–23–9 | 77 |
| 67 | March 13 | Los Angeles | 2–4 | Vancouver | | Luongo | 18,630 | 35–23–9 | 79 |
| 68 | March 15 | Colorado | 2–4 | Vancouver | | Luongo | 18,630 | 36–23–9 | 81 |
| 69 | March 17 | Dallas | 2–4 | Vancouver | | Luongo | 18,630 | 37–23–9 | 83 |
| 70 | March 19 | St. Louis | 0–3 | Vancouver | | Luongo | 18,630 | 38–23–9 | 85 |
| 71 | March 21 | Vancouver | 1–5 | Phoenix | | Luongo | 17,125 | 38–24–9 | 85 |
| 72 | March 24 | Vancouver | 5–2 | Dallas | | Luongo | 17,276 | 39–24–9 | 87 |
| 73 | March 26 | Vancouver | 2–4 | St. Louis | | Luongo | 19,250 | 39–25–9 | 87 |
| 74 | March 27 | Vancouver | 4–1 | Colorado | | LaBarbera | 16,177 | 40–25–9 | 89 |
| 75 | March 29 | Vancouver | 4–0 | Chicago | | Luongo | 21,673 | 41–25–9 | 91 |
| 76 | March 31 | Vancouver | 2–1 | Minnesota | OT | Luongo | 18,568 | 42–25–9 | 93 |

April: 3–2–1 (Home: 2–1–1; Road: 1–1–0)
| # | Date | Visitor | Score | Home | OT | Decision | Attendance | Record | Pts | Recap |
|---|---|---|---|---|---|---|---|---|---|---|
| 77 | April 2 | Anaheim | 6–5 | Vancouver | SO | Luongo | 18,630 | 42–25–10 | 94 |
| 78 | April 4 | Vancouver | 3–5 | Edmonton | | Luongo | 16,839 | 42–26–10 | 94 |
| 79 | April 5 | Colorado | 4–1 | Vancouver | | Luongo | 18,630 | 42–27–10 | 94 |
| 80 | April 7 | Calgary | 1–4 | Vancouver | | Luongo | 18,630 | 43–27–10 | 96 |
| 81 | April 9 | Los Angeles | 0–1 | Vancouver | | Luongo | 18,630 | 44–27–10 | 98 |
| 82 | April 11 | Vancouver | 1–0 | Colorado | OT | Luongo | 13,397 | 45–27–10 | 100 |

Legend: Win (2 points) Loss (0 points) Overtime/shootout loss (1 point)

=== Playoffs ===
2009 Stanley Cup playoffs

Western Conference quarter-final vs. (6) St. Louis Blues: Vancouver won series 4–0
| # | Date | Visitor | Score | Home | OT | Decision | Attendance | Series | Recap |
|---|---|---|---|---|---|---|---|---|---|
| 1 | April 15 | St. Louis | 1–2 | Vancouver | | Luongo | 18,630 | 1–0 |
| 2 | April 17 | St. Louis | 0–3 | Vancouver | | Luongo | 18,630 | 2–0 |
| 3 | April 19 | Vancouver | 3–2 | St. Louis | | Luongo | 19,500 | 3–0 |
| 4 | April 21 | Vancouver | 3–2 | St. Louis | OT | Luongo | 19,250 | 4–0 |

Western Conference semi-final vs. (4) Chicago Blackhawks: Chicago won series 4–2
| # | Date | Visitor | Score | Home | OT | Decision | Attendance | Series | Recap |
|---|---|---|---|---|---|---|---|---|---|
| 1 | April 30 | Chicago | 3–5 | Vancouver | | Luongo | 18,630 | 1–0 |
| 2 | May 2 | Chicago | 6–3 | Vancouver | | Luongo | 18,630 | 1–1 |
| 3 | May 5 | Vancouver | 3–1 | Chicago | | Luongo | 22,659 | 2–1 |
| 4 | May 7 | Vancouver | 1–2 | Chicago | OT | Luongo | 22,682 | 2–2 |
| 5 | May 9 | Chicago | 4–2 | Vancouver | | Luongo | 18,630 | 2–3 |
| 6 | May 11 | Vancouver | 5–7 | Chicago | | Luongo | 22,687 | 2–4 |

Legend: Win Loss

== Player statistics ==
=== Skaters ===
Note: GP = Games played; G = Goals; A = Assists; Pts = Points; +/- = Plus/Minus; PIM = Penalty Minutes

Regular season

| Player | GP | G | A | Pts | +/- | PIM |
|---|---|---|---|---|---|---|
| Daniel Sedin | 82 | 31 | 51 | 82 | +24 | 36 |
| Henrik Sedin | 82 | 22 | 60 | 82 | +22 | 48 |
| Ryan Kesler | 82 | 26 | 33 | 59 | +8 | 61 |
| Pavol Demitra | 69 | 20 | 33 | 53 | +6 | 20 |
| Alex Burrows | 82 | 28 | 23 | 51 | +23 | 150 |
| Kevin Bieksa | 72 | 11 | 32 | 43 | -4 | 97 |
| Alexander Edler | 80 | 10 | 27 | 37 | +11 | 54 |
| Steve Bernier | 81 | 15 | 17 | 32 | +4 | 27 |
| Mats Sundin | 41 | 9 | 19 | 28 | -5 | 28 |
| Kyle Wellwood | 74 | 18 | 9 | 27 | +2 | 4 |
| Mattias Ohlund | 82 | 6 | 19 | 25 | +14 | 105 |
| Sami Salo | 60 | 5 | 20 | 25 | +5 | 26 |
| Mason Raymond | 72 | 11 | 12 | 23 | +2 | 24 |
| Willie Mitchell | 82 | 3 | 20 | 23 | +29 | 59 |
| Jannik Hansen | 55 | 6 | 15 | 21 | +5 | 37 |
| Taylor Pyatt | 69 | 10 | 9 | 19 | 0 | 43 |
| Shane O'Brien^{†} | 76 | 0 | 10 | 10 | +6 | 196 |
| Ryan Johnson | 62 | 2 | 7 | 9 | +1 | 12 |
| Darcy Hordichuk | 73 | 4 | 1 | 5 | +1 | 109 |
| Jason Jaffray | 14 | 2 | 2 | 4 | -2 | 14 |
| Rick Rypien | 12 | 3 | 0 | 3 | -3 | 19 |
| Rob Davison | 23 | 0 | 2 | 2 | -4 | 51 |
| Jason Krog | 4 | 1 | 0 | 1 | 0 | 2 |
| Ossi Vaananen^{†} | 3 | 0 | 1 | 1 | +1 | 0 |
| Alexandre Bolduc | 7 | 0 | 1 | 1 | +1 | 4 |
| Lawrence Nycholat^{‡} | 14 | 0 | 1 | 1 | +3 | 6 |
| Mike Brown^{‡} | 20 | 0 | 1 | 1 | -5 | 85 |
| Michel Ouellet | 3 | 0 | 0 | 0 | +1 | 0 |

Playoffs

| Player | GP | G | A | Pts | +/- | PIM |
|---|---|---|---|---|---|---|
| Henrik Sedin | 10 | 4 | 6 | 10 | +2 | 2 |
| Daniel Sedin | 10 | 4 | 6 | 10 | +4 | 8 |
| Mats Sundin | 8 | 3 | 5 | 8 | -1 | 2 |
| Alexander Edler | 10 | 1 | 7 | 8 | -2 | 6 |
| Sami Salo | 7 | 3 | 4 | 7 | 0 | 2 |
| Kyle Wellwood | 10 | 1 | 5 | 6 | -1 | 0 |
| Kevin Bieksa | 10 | 0 | 5 | 5 | +3 | 14 |
| Alex Burrows | 10 | 3 | 1 | 4 | +3 | 20 |
| Steve Bernier | 10 | 2 | 2 | 4 | -1 | 7 |
| Ryan Kesler | 10 | 2 | 2 | 4 | -2 | 14 |
| Mason Raymond | 10 | 2 | 1 | 3 | -2 | 2 |
| Pavol Demitra | 6 | 1 | 2 | 3 | -2 | 2 |
| Mattias Ohlund | 10 | 1 | 2 | 3 | +5 | 6 |
| Ryan Johnson | 10 | 1 | 1 | 2 | 0 | 2 |
| Shane O'Brien | 10 | 1 | 1 | 2 | -3 | 24 |
| Willie Mitchell | 10 | 0 | 2 | 2 | -2 | 22 |
| Rick Rypien | 10 | 0 | 2 | 2 | -1 | 40 |
| Darcy Hordichuk | 10 | 1 | 0 | 1 | +1 | 14 |
| Jannik Hansen | 2 | 0 | 0 | 0 | 0 | 0 |
| Ossi Vaananen | 3 | 0 | 0 | 0 | 0 | 2 |
| Taylor Pyatt | 4 | 0 | 0 | 0 | -3 | 2 |

=== Goaltenders ===
Note: Pos = Position;GP = Games played; Min, TOI = Minutes played; W = Wins; L = Losses; T,T/OT = Ties; OTL = Overtime losses; GA = Goals-against; GAA = Goals-against average; SO = Shutouts; SA = Shots against; SV = Shots saved; SV% = Save percentage;

Regular season

| Player | GP | Min | W | L | OT | GA | GAA | SA | SV | Sv% | SO |
|---|---|---|---|---|---|---|---|---|---|---|---|
| Roberto Luongo | 54 | 3181 | 33 | 13 | 7 | 124 | 2.34 | 1542 | 1418 | .920 | 9 |
| Curtis Sanford | 19 | 973 | 7 | 8 | 0 | 42 | 2.59 | 448 | 406 | .906 | 1 |
| Jason LaBarbera^{†} | 9 | 451 | 3 | 2 | 2 | 20 | 2.66 | 235 | 215 | .915 | 0 |
| Cory Schneider | 8 | 355 | 2 | 4 | 1 | 20 | 3.38 | 162 | 142 | .877 | 0 |

Playoffs

| Player | GP | Min | W | L | GA | GAA | SA | SV | Sv% | SO |
|---|---|---|---|---|---|---|---|---|---|---|
| Roberto Luongo | 10 | 618 | 6 | 4 | 26 | 2.52 | 304 | 278 | .914 | 1 |

^{†}Denotes player spent time with another team before joining Vancouver. Stats reflect time with the Canucks only.
^{‡}Denotes player no longer with the team. Stats reflect time with Canucks only.

== Awards and records ==
=== Awards ===
- Daniel Sedin was named the NHL's first star of the week for the week ending October 12, 2008.
- Roberto Luongo was named the NHL's first star of the week for the week ending November 9, 2008.
- Henrik Sedin was named the NHL's second star of the week for the week ending November 23, 2008.
- Roberto Luongo was named to the Western Conference roster for the 57th National Hockey League All-Star Game in Montreal.
- Daniel Sedin was named the NHL's second star of the week for the week ending March 29, 2009.
- Henrik Sedin was named the NHL's second star of the month for March.
- Roberto Luongo was named the NHL's first star of the week for the week ending April 12, 2009.

=== Records ===
- Roberto Luongo set a franchise record for consecutive shutout minutes with 242:36 on November 12, 2008 versus the Colorado Avalanche.
- The Canucks set a franchise record for consecutive home losses with 7 on January 18, 2009 versus the Columbus Blue Jackets.
- Mattias Ohlund set a franchise record for the most points scored by a defenceman with 322 points on March 15, 2009 versus the Colorado Avalanche.
- The Canucks set a franchise record for consecutive home wins with 11 on March 19, 2009 versus the St. Louis Blues.
- Roberto Luongo set a franchise record for most shutouts in a season with 8 on April 9, 2009 versus the Los Angeles Kings, and ended the season with one more, for a total of 9 shutouts and tying Kirk McLean for the all-time franchise lead in shutouts.

=== Milestones ===
Regular Season
| Player | Milestone | Reached |
| Pavol Demitra | 700th point | October 11, 2008 |
| Alexander Edler | 100th game | October 13, 2008 |
| Jannik Hansen | 1st goal | October 16, 2008 |
| Roberto Luongo | 200th win | October 16, 2008 |
| Alain Vigneault | 200th win | October 16, 2008 |
| Jason Krog | 200th game | October 25, 2008 |
| Roberto Luongo | 500th game | October 31, 2008 |
| Mattias Ohlund | 700th game | November 2, 2008 |
| Henrik Sedin | 300th assist | November 4, 2008 |
| Kyle Wellwood | 200th game | November 12, 2008 |
| Rob Davison | 200th game | November 20, 2008 |
| Daniel Sedin | 400th point | November 24, 2008 |
| Alexandre Bolduc | 1st game | November 27, 2008 |
| Henrik Sedin | 400th point | November 27, 2008 |
| Steve Bernier | 200th game | November 29, 2008 |
| Cory Schneider | 1st game | November 29, 2008 |
| Steve Bernier | 100th point | December 4, 2008 |
| Cory Schneider | 1st win | December 5, 2008 |
| Curtis Sanford | 100th game | December 17, 2008 |
| Ryan Kesler | 100th point | December 22, 2008 |
| Henrik Sedin | 600th game | December 26, 2008 |
| Jason LaBarbera | 100th game | January 2, 2009 |
| Daniel Sedin | 600th game | January 2, 2009 |
| Alexandre Bolduc | 1st point 1st assist | January 4, 2009 |
| Shane O'Brien | 200th game | January 7, 2009 |
| Willie Mitchell | 500th game | January 10, 2009 |
| Taylor Pyatt | 500th game | January 13, 2009 |
| Willie Mitchell | 100th point | January 18, 2009 |
| Henrik Sedin | 100th goal | March 13, 2009 |
| Alain Vigneault | 500th game | March 19, 2009 |
| Pavol Demitra | 300th goal | March 31, 2009 |
| Alex Burrows | 100th point | April 2, 2009 |

== Transactions ==
=== Trades ===
| June 4, 2008 | To Vancouver Canucks Steve Bernier | To Buffalo Sabres 3rd-round pick in 2009 – Brayden McNabb; 2nd-round pick in 2010 – Petr Straka |
| September 2, 2008 | To Vancouver Canucks Lawrence Nycholat | To Ottawa Senators Ryan Shannon |
| October 6, 2008 | To Vancouver Canucks Shane O'Brien; Michel Ouellet | To Tampa Bay Lightning Lukas Krajicek; Juraj Simek |
| December 9, 2008 | To Vancouver Canucks Conditional pick in 2009 | To Chicago Blackhawks Jimmy Sharrow |
| December 30, 2008 | To Vancouver Canucks Jason LaBarbera | To Los Angeles Kings 7th-round pick in 2009 – Jordan Samuels-Thomas |
| February 4, 2009 | To Vancouver Canucks Nathan McIver | To Anaheim Ducks Mike Brown |

=== Free agents acquired ===
| Player | Former team | Contract terms |
| Darcy Hordichuk | Carolina Hurricanes | Three-year, $2.25-million |
| Ryan Johnson | St. Louis Blues | Two-year, $2.3-million |
| Nolan Baumgartner | Dallas Stars | Two-way deal, $1.2-million |
| Mark Cullen | Detroit Red Wings | One-year, $500,000 |
| Pavol Demitra | Minnesota Wild | Two-year, $8-million |
| Rob Davison | New York Islanders | One-year, $560,000 |
| Jason Krog | Atlanta Thrashers | One-year, $700,000 |
| Mats Sundin | Toronto Maple Leafs | One-year, $5-million |

=== Free agents lost ===
| Player | New team | Contract Terms |
| Drew MacIntyre | Nashville Predators | |
| Markus Naslund | New York Rangers | Two-year, $8-million |
| Brendan Morrison | Anaheim Ducks | One-year, $2.75-million |
| Mike Weaver | St. Louis Blues | |
| Brad Isbister | Ottawa Senators | Two-way deal |
| Trevor Linden | | Retired |

=== Received from waivers ===
| Player | From |
| Kyle Wellwood | Toronto Maple Leafs |
| Ossi Vaananen | Philadelphia Flyers |

=== Lost on waivers ===
| Player | New Team |
| Nathan McIver | Anaheim Ducks |
| Matt Pettinger | Tampa Bay Lightning |
| Lawrence Nycholat | Calgary Flames |

=== Draft picks ===
Vancouver's picks at the 2008 NHL entry draft in Ottawa, Ontario.

| Round | # | Player | Nationality | College/Junior/Club team (League) |
|---|---|---|---|---|
| 1 | 10 | Cody Hodgson (C) | Canada | Brampton Battalion (OHL) |
| 2 | 41 | Yann Sauve (D) | Canada | Saint John Sea Dogs (QMJHL) |
| 5 | 131 | Prab Rai (C) | Canada | Seattle Thunderbirds (WHL) |
| 6 | 161 | Mats Frøshaug (C) | Norway | Linköpings HC Jr. (Sweden) |
| 7 | 191 | Morgan Clark (G) | Canada | Red Deer Rebels (WHL) |

== 7th Canuck ==
On October 25, 2008, the Canucks retired the jersey number '7' in honour of the fans, the "seventh Canuck". Originally, the plan was to have a randomly selected season ticket holder unveil the banner before every home game and have it raised to the rafters, but after the first game it was abandoned.

== Farm teams ==
=== Manitoba Moose ===
The Canucks' AHL affiliate based in Winnipeg, Manitoba. The Moose' home arena is the MTS Centre. The team has been affiliated with the Vancouver Canucks since the 2000–01 AHL season.

=== Victoria Salmon Kings ===
The Canucks' ECHL affiliate based in Victoria, British Columbia. The Salmon Kings' home arena is the Save-On-Foods Memorial Centre. The team has been affiliated with the Vancouver Canucks since the 2006–07 ECHL season.
