= 2008–09 Anaheim Ducks season =

NHL team season

2008–09 Anaheim Ducks
- Division: 2nd Pacific
- Conference: 8th Western
- 2008–09 record: 42–33–7
- Home record: 20–18–3
- Road record: 22–15–4
- Goals for: 245
- Goals against: 238

Team information
- General manager: Bob Murray
- Coach: Randy Carlyle
- Captain: Scott Niedermayer
- Alternate captains: Ryan Getzlaf; Chris Pronger
- Arena: Honda Center
- Average attendance: 16,991 (98.9%); Total: 696,629

Team leaders
- Goals: Corey Perry (32)
- Assists: Ryan Getzlaf (66)
- Points: Ryan Getzlaf (91)
- Penalty minutes: George Parros (135)
- Plus/minus: Steve Montador (+14)
- Wins: Jonas Hiller (23)
- Goals against average: Jonas Hiller (2.39)

The 2008–09 Anaheim Ducks season was the Anaheim Ducks' 16th season of operation for the National Hockey League (NHL) franchise. The Ducks first game of the season was held on October 9, 2008, against the San Jose Sharks at the SAP Center. In the first round, they upset the Presidents' Trophy winning San Jose Sharks in six games. However, their season came to an end following a seven-game defeat at the hands of the Detroit Red Wings in the following round.

== Schedule and results ==
=== Preseason ===
2008 Preseason Game Log
September: 3–1–1 (Home: 1–0–1; Road: 2–1–0)

#	Date	Opponent	Score	OT	Win	Loss	Attendance	Record	Arena	Box
1	September 24	Sharks	6–4		Giguere (1–0–0)	Greiss (0–1–0)	15,243	1–0–0	Honda Center	W1
2	September 26	@ Sharks	5–2		Nabokov (1–0–0)	Hiller (0–1–0)	17,271	1–1–0	HP Pavilion at San Jose	L1
3	September 27	@ Coyotes	3–1		LeNeveu (1–0–0)	Bryzgalov (0–1–0)	8,417	2–1–0	Jobing.com Arena	W1
4	September 28	Canucks	5–4	SO	Sanford (1–0–0)	LeNeveu (1–0–1)	16,481	2–1–1	Honda Center	O1
5	September 30	@ Kings	2–1	SO	Hiller (1–1–0)	LaBarbera (0–1–0)	11,904	3–1–1	Staples Center	W1

October: 3–0–0 (Home: 2–0–0; Road: 1–0–0)

#	Date	Opponent	Score	OT	Win	Loss	Attendance	Record	Arena	Box
6	October 1	Kings	3–2	OT	Giguere (2–0–0)	Ersberg (0–1–0)	16,410	4–1–1	Honda Center	W2
7	October 3	Coyotes	4–1		Hiller (2–1–0)	Tellqvist (0–2–0)	16,371	5–1–1	Honda Center	W3
8	October 5	@ Canucks	4–3	OT	Giguere (3–0–0)	Luongo (3–1–0)	18,630	6–1–1	General Motors Place	W4

Legend
Ducks Win	Ducks Loss	OT Loss

=== Regular season ===
2008–09 Game Log
October: 6–5–1 (Home: 2–3–1; Road: 4–2–0)

#	Date	Opponent	Score	OT	Win	Loss	Attendance	Record	Arena	Box	Points
1	October 9	@ Sharks	4–1		Nabokov (1–0–0)	Giguere (0–1–0)	17,496	0–1–0	HP Pavilion at San Jose	L1	0
2	October 12	Coyotes	4–2		Bryzgalov (2–0–0)	Giguere (0–2–0)	17,174	0–2–0	Honda Center	L2	0
3	October 14	@ Kings	6–3		LaBarbera (1–2–0)	Giguere (0–3–0)	14,451	0–3–0	Staples Center	L3	0
4	October 15	Oilers	3–2		Garon (2–0–0)	Hiller (0–1–0)	16,604	0–4–0	Honda Center	L4	0
5	October 17	Sharks	4–0		Giguere (1–3–0)	Nabokov (3–1–0)	17,174	1–4–0	Honda Center	W1	2
6	October 19	Hurricanes	3–1		Leighton (2–0–0)	Giguere (1–4–0)	16,847	1–5–0	Honda Center	L1	2
7	October 21	@ Maple Leafs	3–2	SO	Giguere (2–4–0)	Joseph (0–1–1)	19,222	2–5–0	Air Canada Centre	W1	4
8	October 24	@ Senators	4–3		Hiller (1–1–0)	Auld (1–1–0)	19,762	3–5–0	Scotiabank Place	W2	6
9	October 25	@ Canadiens	6–4		Giguere (3–4–0)	Price (4–1–1)	21,273	4–5–0	Bell Centre	W3	8
10	October 27	@ Blue Jackets	3–2		Giguere (4–4–0)	Norrena (0–3–0)	10,494	5–5–0	Nationwide Arena	W4	10
11	October 29	Red Wings	4–5	OT	Giguere (5–4–0)	Osgood (5–1–2)	17,174	6–5–0	Honda Center	W5	12
12	October 31	Canucks	7–6	SO	Luongo (6–4–0)	Hiller (1–1–1)	16,704	6–5–1	Honda Center	O1	13

November: 8–3–2 (Home: 5–3–1; Road: 3–0–1)

#	Date	Opponent	Score	OT	Win	Loss	Attendance	Record	Arena	Box	Points
13	November 2	Flames	2–3		Giguere (6–4–0)	Kiprusoff (14–8–2)	16,965	7–5–1	Honda Center	W1	15
14	November 4	@ Kings	1–0	OT	Giguere (7–4–0)	Ersberg (0–1–1)	14,327	8–5–1	Staples Center	W2	17
15	November 5	Blues	5–2		Hiller (2–1–1)	Mason (0–4–0)	16,144	9–5–1	Honda Center	W3	19
16	November 7	Stars	5–2		Turco (4–5–2)	Giguere (7–5–0)	17,048	9–6–1	Honda Center	L1	19
17	November 9	Panthers	3–1		Anderson (2–1–1)	Giguere (7–6–0)	16,951	9–7–1	Honda Center	L2	19
18	November 14	Predators	4–3	OT	Ellis (6–7–1)	Giguere (7–6–1)	16,485	9–7–2	Honda Center	O1	20
19	November 16	Kings	2–0		Hiller (3–1–1)	Ersberg (4–3–1)	17,174	10–7–2	Honda Center	W1	22
20	November 19	Capitals	6–4		Theodore (6–3–1)	Giguere (7–7–1)	16,076	10–8–2	Honda Center	L1	22
21	November 21	@ Blues	3–2	OT	Legace (6–3–1)	Giguere (7–7–2)	19,150	10–8–3	Scottrade Center	O1	23
22	November 22	@ Stars	2–1	SO	Hiller (4–1–1)	Turco (5–8–4)	17,734	11–8–3	American Airlines Center	W1	25
23	November 24	Avalanche	4–1		Giguere (8–7–2)	Budaj (7–10–0)	16,632	12–8–3	Honda Center	W2	27
24	November 28	Blackhawks	1–0		Hiller (5–1–1)	Huet (3–4–2)	16,994	13–8–3	Honda Center	W3	29
25	November 30	@ Hurricanes	4–1		Hiller (6–1–1)	Leighton (4–4–0)	14,191	14–8–3	RBC Center	W4	31

December: 5–7–1 (Home: 3–2–0; Road: 2–5–1)

#	Date	Opponent	Score	OT	Win	Loss	Attendance	Record	Arena	Box	Points
26	December 1	@ Red Wings	2–1		Osgood (10–1–4)	Hiller (6–2–1)	18,862	14–9–3	Joe Louis Arena	L1	31
27	December 3	@ Blackhawks	4–2		Huet (4–5–2)	Hiller (6–3–1)	21,574	14–10–3	United Center	L2	31
28	December 7	Blue Jackets	5–3		Giguere (9–7–2)	Leclaire (4–5–0)	16,914	15–10–3	Honda Center	W1	33
29	December 10	Blues	4–2		Giguere (10–7–2)	Mason (3–7–1)	16,058	16–10–3	Honda Center	W2	35
30	December 11	@ Sharks	2–0		Nabokov (16–2–1)	Hiller (6–4–1)	17,496	16–11–3	HP Pavilion at San Jose	L1	35
31	December 14	Wild	4–2		Giguere (11–7–2)	Harding (1–3–0)	16,577	17–11–3	Honda Center	W1	37
32	December 16	Rangers	3–1		Lundqvist (18–9–2)	Hiller (6–5–1)	16,921	17–12–3	Honda Center	L1	37
33	December 19	@ Oilers	3–2	SO	Hiller (7–5–1)	Roloson (6–5–3)	16,839	18–12–3	Rexall Place	W1	39
34	December 22	@ Canucks	4–3		Sanford (6–5–0)	Hiller (7–6–1)	18,630	18–13–3	General Motors Place	L1	39
35	December 23	@ Flames	4–3		Kiprusoff (19–10–3)	Giguere (11–8–2)	19,289	18–14–3	Pengrowth Saddledome	L2	39
36	December 27	@ Stars	4–3	OT	Turco (14–12–5)	Giguere (11–8–3)	18,532	18–14–4	American Airlines Center	O1	40
37	December 28	@ Blues	4–3		Hiller (8–6–1)	Mason (4–10–1)	19,150	19–14–4	Scottrade Center	W1	42
38	December 31	Blue Jackets	2–0		Mason (12–7–1)	Giguere (11–9–3)	16,758	19–15–4	Honda Center	L1	42

January: 6–7–1 (Home: 3–3–1; Road: 3–4–0)

#	Date	Opponent	Score	OT	Win	Loss	Attendance	Record	Arena	Box	Points
39	January 2	Flyers	5–4	SO	Biron (13–7–4)	Giguere (11–9–4)	17,597	19–15–5	Honda Center	O1	43
40	January 4	Coyotes	2–0		Hiller (9–6–1)	Bryzgalov (13–13–4)	16,878	20–15–5	Honda Center	W1	45
41	January 6	Kings	3–1		Hiller (10–6–1)	Ersberg (8–6–2)	17,174	21–15–5	Honda Center	W2	47
42	January 8	@ Kings	4–3		Quick (4–3–0)	Hiller (10–7–1)	18,118	21–16–5	Staples Center	L1	47
43	January 9	Lightning	4–3		Ramo (1–0–0)	Hiller (10–8–1)	17,174	21–17–5	Honda Center	L2	47
44	January 11	Devils	4–3		Giguere (12–9–4)	Clemmensen (15–9–1)	17,331	22–17–5	Honda Center	W1	49
45	January 14	Red Wings	4–3		Osgood (15–2–5)	Giguere (12–10–4)	17,525	22–18–5	Honda Center	L1	49
46	January 16	@ Penguins	3–1		Fleury (14–11–2)	Giguere (12–11–4)	17,005	22–19–5	Mellon Arena	L2	49
47	January 17	@ Wild	3–0		Hiller (11–8–1)	Backstrom (21–14–2)	18,568	23–19–5	Xcel Energy Center	W1	51
48	January 20	@ Rangers	4–2		Lundqvist (24–13–3)	Hiller (11–9–1)	18,200	23–20–5	Madison Square Garden	L1	51
49	January 21	@ Islanders	2–1		Danis (1–5–1)	Giguere (12–12–4)	11,853	23–21–5	Nassau Memorial Coliseum	L1	51
January 25: All-Star Game (East wins—Box)			12–11	SO	Price (MON)	Giguere (ANA)	21,273		Bell Centre	Montreal, QC	
50	January 27	@ Coyotes	7–3		Hiller (12–9–1)	Bryzgalov (18–16–4)	15,383	24–21–5	Jobing.com Arena	W1	53
51	January 28	Blackhawks	3–2		Khabibulin (14–4–5)	Hiller (12–10–1)	17,193	24–22–5	Honda Center	L1	53
52	January 31	@ Avalanche	4–3		Hiller (13–10–1)	Budaj (14–20–1)	17,652	25–22–5	Pepsi Center	W1	55

February: 6–6–0 (Home: 2–2–0; Road: 4–4–0)

#	Date	Opponent	Score	OT	Win	Loss	Attendance	Record	Arena	Box	Points
53	February 2	Sabres	3–2		Hiller (14–10–1)	Lalime (2–7–1)	16,874	26–22–5	Honda Center	W2	57
54	February 4	@ Wild	3–0		Backstrom (25–16–2)	Hiller (14–11–1)	18,568	26–23–5	Xcel Energy Center	L1	57
55	February 5	@ Predators	4–2		Rinne (14–8–0)	Giguere (12–13–4)	14,877	26–24–5	Sommet Center	L2	57
56	February 7	@ Flames	2–1		Giguere (13–13–4)	McElhinney (0–3–1)	19,289	27–24–5	Pengrowth Saddledome	W1	59
57	February 11	Flames	3–2	OT	Giguere (14–13–4)	Kiprusoff (31–15–4)	17,270	28–24–5	Honda Center	W2	61
58	February 15	Thrashers	8–4		Lehtonen (11–17–2)	Giguere (14–14–4)	17,228	28–25–5	Honda Center	L1	61
59	February 18	Kings	4–3		Quick (12–7–1)	Hiller (14–12–1)	17,089	28–26–5	Honda Center	L2	61
60	February 20	@ Red Wings	5–2		Conklin (21–7–1)	Giguere (14–15–4)	20,066	28–27–5	Joe Louis Arena	L3	61
61	February 21	@ Blue Jackets	5–2		Giguere (15–15–4)	Mason (23–13–3)	18,628	29–27–5	Nationwide Arena	W1	63
62	February 24	@ Sabres	3–2		Giguere (16–15–4)	Lalime (2–8–1)	18,690	30–27–5	HSBC Arena	W2	65
63	February 26	@ Bruins	6–0		Thomas (27–8–5)	Giguere (16–16–4)	17,565	30–28–5	TD Banknorth Garden	L1	65
64	February 28	@ Stars	4–3		Giguere (17–16–4)	Turco (28–23–7)	18,171	31–28–5	American Airlines Center	W1	67

March: 8–4–1 (Home: 4–4–0; Road: 4–0–1)

#	Date	Opponent	Score	OT	Win	Loss	Attendance	Record	Arena	Box	Points
65	March 3	@ Blackhawks	2–3	OT	Huet (18–12–3)	Giguere (17–16–5)	21,619	31–28–6	United Center	O1	68
66	March 6	Stars	3–2		Turco (30–23–8)	Giguere (17–17–5)	17,380	31–29–6	Honda Center	L1	68
67	March 8	Wild	3–2		Backstrom (30–19–4)	Hiller (14–13–1)	17,300	31–30–6	Honda Center	L2	68
68	March 11	Canucks	3–4	OT	Hiller (15–13–1)	Luongo (23–9–6)	16,967	32–30–6	Honda Center	W1	70
69	March 15	Sharks	1–0		Nabokov (34–8–7)	Hiller (15–14–1)	17,511	32–31–6	Honda Center	L1	70
70	March 18	Predators	3–4	OT	Giguere (18–17–5)	Rinne (24–11–2)	16,181	33–31–6	Honda Center	W1	72
71	March 19	@ Coyotes	3–2	SO	Hiller (16–14–1)	Bryzgalov (22–28–6)	12,739	34–31–6	Jobing.com Arena	W2	74
72	March 22	Coyotes	2–6		Hiller (17–14–1)	Bryzgalov (23–29–6)	17,215	35–31–6	Honda Center	W3	76
73	March 24	@ Predators	2–1	SO	Giguere (19–17–5)	Rinne (24–11–4)	16,418	36–31–6	Sommet Center	W4	78
74	March 25	@ Avalanche	7–2		Hiller (18–14–1)	Budaj (19–28–2)	16,279	37–31–6	Pepsi Center	W5	80
75	March 27	Oilers	5–3		Roloson (27–20–9)	Giguere (19–18–5)	17,257	37–32–6	Honda Center	L1	80
76	March 29	Avalanche	1–4		Hiller (19–14–1)	Budaj (19–29–2)	17,182	38–32–6	Honda Center	W1	82
77	March 31	@ Oilers	5–3		Hiller (20–14–1)	Roloson (27–22–9)	16,839	39–32–6	Rexall Place	W2	84

April: 3–1–1 (Home: 1–1–0; Road: 2–0–1)

#	Date	Opponent	Score	OT	Win	Loss	Attendance	Record	Arena	Box	Points
78	April 2	@ Canucks	6–5	SO	Hiller (21–14–1)	Luongo (30–11–7)	18,630	40–32–6	General Motors Place	W3	86
79	April 4	@ Sharks	5–2		Hiller (22–14–1)	Nabokov (40–10–8)	17,496	41–32–6	HP Pavilion at San Jose	W4	88
80	April 5	Sharks	3–2		Boucher (12–6–3)	Hiller (22–15–1)	17,398	41–33–6	Honda Center	L1	88
81	April 10	Stars	4–3	SO	Hiller (23–15–1)	Turco (33–31–10)	17,531	42–33–6	Honda Center	W1	90
82	April 11	@ Coyotes	5–4	SO	Bryzgalov (26–31–6)	Giguere (19–18–6)	16,438	42–33–7	Jobing.com Arena	O1	91

Legend
Ducks Win (2 pts.)	Ducks Loss (0 pts.)	All-Star Game	OT Loss (1 pt.)	Clinched Playoffs

"Points" Legend
1st (Pacific Division)	Not in Playoff Position	In Playoff Position

=== Post-season ===
The Anaheim Ducks ended the 2008–09 regular season as the Western Conference's eighth seed.

2009 Postseason Game Log
Western Conference Quarter-Finals (4–2)

#	Date	Opponent	Score	OT	Win	Loss	Attendance	Record	Arena	Box
1	April 16	@ Sharks	2–0		Hiller (1–0)	Nabokov (0–1)	17,496	1–0	HP Pavilion at San Jose	W1
2	April 19	@ Sharks	3–2		Hiller (2–0)	Nabokov (0–2)	17,496	2–0	HP Pavilion at San Jose	W2
3	April 21	Sharks	4–3		Nabokov (1–2)	Hiller (2–1)	16,277	2–1	Honda Center	L1
4	April 23	Sharks	4–0		Hiller (3–1)	Nabokov (1–3)	16,830	3–1	Honda Center	W1
5	April 25	@ Sharks	3–2	OT	Nabokov (2–3)	Hiller (3–2)	17,496	3–2	HP Pavilion at San Jose	L1
6	April 27	Sharks	4–1		Hiller (4–2)	Nabokov (2–4)	17,174	4–2	Honda Center	W1

Western Conference Semi-Finals (3–4)

#	Date	Opponent	Score	OT	Win	Loss	Attendance	Record	Arena	Box
1	May 1	@ Red Wings	3–2		Osgood (5–0)	Hiller (4–3)	20,066	0–1	Joe Louis Arena	L1
2	May 3	@ Red Wings	4–3	3OT	Hiller (5–3)	Osgood (5–1)	20,066	1–1	Joe Louis Arena	W1
3	May 5	Red Wings	2–1		Hiller (6–3)	Osgood (5–2)	17,174	2–1	Honda Center	W2
4	May 7	Red Wings	6–3		Osgood (6–2)	Hiller (6–4)	17,601	2–2	Honda Center	L1
5	May 10	@ Red Wings	4–1		Osgood (7–2)	Hiller (6–5)	20,066	2–3	Joe Louis Arena	L2
6	May 12	Red Wings	2–1		Hiller (7–5)	Osgood (7–3)	17,174	3–3	Honda Center	W1
7	May 14	@ Red Wings	4–3		Osgood (8–3)	Hiller (7–6)	20,066	3–4	Joe Louis Arena	L1

Legend
Ducks Win	Ducks Loss

== Standings ==
=== Divisional standings ===
Pacific Division
		GP	W	L	OTL	GF	GA	Pts
**1**	**p – San Jose Sharks**	**82**	**53**	**18**	**11**	**257**	**204**	**117**
**2**	**Anaheim Ducks**	**82**	**42**	**33**	**7**	**245**	**238**	**91**
3	Dallas Stars	82	36	35	11	230	257	83
4	Phoenix Coyotes	82	36	39	7	208	252	79
5	Los Angeles Kings	82	34	37	11	207	234	79

Note: No. = Division rank, CR = Conference rank, W = Wins, L = Losses, T = Ties, GF = Goals For, GA = Goals Against, Pts = Points
Teams that qualified for the playoffs are highlighted in bold.

=== Conference standings ===
Western Conference
R		Div	GP	W	L	OTL	GF	GA	Pts
**1**	**p – San Jose Sharks**	**PA**	**82**	**53**	**18**	**11**	**257**	**204**	117
**2**	**y – Detroit Red Wings**	**CE**	**82**	**51**	**21**	**10**	**295**	**244**	112
**3**	**y – Vancouver Canucks**	**NW**	**82**	**45**	**27**	**10**	**246**	**220**	100
**4**	**Chicago Blackhawks**	**CE**	**82**	**46**	**24**	**12**	**264**	**216**	104
**5**	**Calgary Flames**	**NW**	**82**	**46**	**30**	**6**	**254**	**248**	98
**6**	**St. Louis Blues**	**CE**	**82**	**41**	**31**	**10**	**233**	**233**	92
**7**	**Columbus Blue Jackets**	**CE**	**82**	**41**	**31**	**10**	**226**	**230**	92
**8**	**Anaheim Ducks**	**PA**	**82**	**42**	**33**	**7**	**245**	**238**	91
8.5
9	Minnesota Wild	NW	82	40	33	9	219	200	89
10	Nashville Predators	CE	82	40	34	8	213	233	88
11	Edmonton Oilers	NW	82	38	35	9	234	248	85
12	Dallas Stars	PA	82	36	35	11	230	257	83
13	Phoenix Coyotes	PA	82	36	39	7	208	252	79
14	Los Angeles Kings	PA	82	34	37	11	207	234	79
15	Colorado Avalanche	NW	82	32	45	5	199	257	69

bold – qualified for playoffs, y – division winner, p – Presidents' Trophy winner
CE – Central Division, NW – Northwest Division, PA – Pacific Division

== Player statistics ==
=== Skaters ===
Note: Pos = Position; GP = Games played; G = Goals; A = Assists; Pts = Points; PIM = Penalty minutes; +/- = Plus/minus; PPG = Power-play goals; SHG = Short-handed goals; GWG = Game-winning goals

Regular season

Player	GP	G	A	Pts	+/−	PIM
Ryan Getzlaf	81	25	66	91	+5	121
Corey Perry	78	32	40	72	+10	109
Scott Niedermayer	82	14	45	59	-8	70
Bobby Ryan	64	31	26	57	+13	33
Teemu Selanne	65	27	27	54	-3	36
Chris Pronger	82	11	37	48	0	88
Chris Kunitz^{‡}	62	16	19	35	+9	55
Andrew Ebbett	48	8	24	32	+8	24
Brendan Morrison^{‡}	62	10	12	22	0	16
Rob Niedermayer	79	14	7	21	-17	42
Steve Montador^{‡}	65	4	16	20	+14	125
Todd Marchant	72	5	13	18	-2	34
Samuel Pahlsson^{‡}	52	5	10	15	-16	32
Travis Moen^{‡}	63	4	7	11	-17	77
James Wisniewski^{†}	17	1	10	11	+3	16
George Parros	74	5	5	10	+8	135
Ryan Whitney^{†}	20	0	10	10	+1	12
Drew Miller	27	4	6	10	0	17
Erik Christensen^{†}	17	2	7	9	-2	6
Ryan Carter	48	3	6	9	+3	52
Bret Hedican	51	1	5	6	-7	36
Brian Sutherby^{‡}	17	3	3	6	+6	19
Kent Huskins^{‡}	33	2	4	6	+6	27
Petteri Nokelainen^{†}	17	4	2	6	+3	6
Brad May^{‡}	20	0	5	5	+5	28
Francois Beauchemin	20	4	1	5	-3	12
Brett Festerling	40	0	5	5	+5	18
Sheldon Brookbank^{†}	29	1	3	4	+3	51
Mike Brown^{†}	28	2	1	3	-2	60
Brendan Mikkelson	34	0	2	2	0	17
Nathan McIver^{‡}	18	0	1	1	+2	36
Brian Salcido	2	0	1	1	+2	0
Ken Klee^{‡}	3	0	0	0	0	4
Troy Bodie	4	0	0	0	0	0
Matt Beleskey	2	0	0	0	0	0

Playoffs

Player	GP	G	A	Pts	+/−	PIM
Ryan Getzlaf	13	4	14	18	+3	25
Corey Perry	13	8	6	14	+2	36
Scott Niedermayer	13	3	7	10	0	11
Chris Pronger	13	2	8	10	+4	12
Bobby Ryan	13	5	2	7	0	0
Teemu Selanne	13	4	2	6	-2	4
Ryan Whitney	13	1	5	6	-1	9
Ryan Carter	10	2	3	5	0	0
Rob Niedermayer	13	0	3	3	+1	12
James Wisniewski	12	1	2	3	0	10
Drew Miller	13	2	1	3	+1	2
Andrew Ebbett	13	1	2	3	-1	8
Todd Marchant	13	1	1	2	0	16
Erik Christensen	8	0	2	2	-1	0
Mike Brown	13	0	2	2	0	25
Francois Beauchemin	13	1	0	1	+1	15
Josh Green	5	0	0	0	0	0
Sheldon Brookbank	13	0	0	0	-1	18
George Parros	7	0	0	0	0	9
Petteri Nokelainen	9	0	0	0	-1	2
Brett Festerling	1	0	0	0	-1	0

=== Goaltenders ===
Note: Pos = Position;GP = Games played; Min, TOI = Minutes played; W = Wins; L = Losses; T,T/OT = Ties; OTL = Overtime losses; GA = Goals-against; GAA = Goals-against average; SO = Shutouts; SA = Shots against; SV = Shots saved; SV% = Save percentage;

Regular season

Player	GP	Min	W	L	OT	GA	GAA	SA	SV	Sv%	SO
Jean-Sebastien Giguere	46	2458	19	18	6	127	3.10	1274	1147	.900	2
Jonas Hiller	46	2486	23	15	1	99	2.39	1217	1118	.919	4

Playoffs

Player	GP	Min	W	L	GA	GAA	SA	SV	Sv%	SO
Jonas Hiller	13	806	7	6	30	2.23	524	494	.943	2
Jean-Sebastien Giguere	1	16	0	0	0	0.00	6	6	1.000	0

^{†}Denotes player spent time with another team before joining Ducks. Stats reflect time with Ducks only.
^{‡}Traded mid-season.
Bold/italics denotes franchise record

== Awards and records ==
=== Records ===
- Ryan Getzlaf – Most assists in a season (66)
- Bobby Ryan – Most rookie goals in a season (31)
- Bobby Ryan – Most rookie points in a season (57)

=== Milestones ===
Regular Season
Player	Milestone	Reached
Nathan McIver	1st NHL Assist; 1st NHL Point	October 14, 2008
Samuel Pahlsson	500th NHL Game	October 24, 2008
Jonas Hiller	1st NHL Shutout	November 16, 2008
Bret Hedican	1,000th NHL Game	November 21, 2008
Brett Festerling	1st NHL Assist; 1st NHL Point	December 3, 2008
Jean-Sebastien Giguere	200th NHL win	December 10, 2008
Todd Marchant	1,000 NHL Game	December 22, 2008
Brendan Mikkelson	1st NHL Assist; 1st NHL Point	January 31, 2009
Chris Pronger	1,000th NHL Game	February 20, 2009
Brian Salcido	1st NHL Assist; 1st NHL Point	February 21, 2009
Rob Niedermayer	1,000 NHL Game	March 19, 2009
Sheldon Brookbank	1st NHL Goal	March 31, 2009

== Transactions ==
- June 27: Todd Bertuzzi was placed on unconditional waivers as the Ducks will buy out the final year of his contract.
- September 16: Mathieu Schneider was placed on waivers.
- September 17: Mathieu Schneider cleared waivers.
- September 28: Re-signed Teemu Selanne to a two-year contract.

=== Trades ===
June 20, 2008	To Anaheim Ducks 1st-round (17th overall) pick in 2008 – Jake Gardiner; 1st-round (28th overall) pick in 2008^{1} – Viktor Tikhonov	To Los Angeles Kings 1st-round (12th overall) pick in 2008^{2} – Tyler Myers
June 20, 2008	To Anaheim Ducks 2nd-round pick in 2008 – Eric O'Dell; 2nd-round pick in 2008 – Nicolas Deschamps	To Phoenix Coyotes 1st-round pick (28th overall) in 2008 – Viktor Tikhonov
September 26, 2008	To Anaheim Ducks Ken Klee; Brad Larsen; Chad Painchaud	To Atlanta Thrashers Mathieu Schneider
September 30, 2008	To Anaheim Ducks Conditional pick in 2009	To Los Angeles Kings Sean O'Donnell
December 3, 2008	To Anaheim Ducks Logan Stephenson	To Phoenix Coyotes Joakim Lindstrom
January 7, 2009	To Anaheim Ducks Conditional 6th-round draft pick in 2010 (condition not satisfied)	To Toronto Maple Leafs Brad May
February 4, 2009	To Anaheim Ducks Mike Brown	To Vancouver Canucks Nathan McIver
February 4, 2009	To Anaheim Ducks Sheldon Brookbank	To New Jersey Devils David McIntyre
February 26, 2009	To Anaheim Ducks Ryan Whitney	To Pittsburgh Penguins Chris Kunitz; Eric Tangradi
March 4, 2009	To Anaheim Ducks Petteri Nokelainen	To Boston Bruins Steve Montador
March 4, 2009	To Anaheim Ducks Erik Christensen	To Atlanta Thrashers Eric O'Dell
March 4, 2009	To Anaheim Ducks James Wisniewski	To Chicago Blackhawks Samuel Pahlsson
March 4, 2009	To Anaheim Ducks Nick Bonino; Timo Pielmeier; Conditional 4th-round pick in 2012 – Andrew O'Brien	To San Jose Sharks Travis Moen; Kent Huskins

1. Pick later traded to Phoenix Coyotes.
2. Pick later traded to Buffalo Sabres

=== Free agents ===
Player / Former team / Contract Terms; Brendan Morrison / Vancouver Canucks / US$2.75-million, one-year contract	Player / New team; Todd Bertuzzi / Calgary Flames

=== Claimed from waivers ===
Player	Former team	Date claimed off waivers

== Draft picks ==
The Ducks' picks at the 2008 NHL entry draft in Ottawa, Ontario.

Round	#	Player	Position	Nationality	College/Junior/Club team (League)
1	17 (from Calgary via Los Angeles)	Jake Gardiner	(D)	United States	Minnetonka High School (USHS-MN)
2	35 (from Phoenix (compensatory))	Nicolas Deschamps	(C)	Canada	Chicoutimi Saguenéens (QMJHL)
2	39 (from Phoenix)	Eric O'Dell	(C)	Canada	Sudbury Wolves (OHL)
2	43 (from Edmonton)	Justin Schultz	(D)	Canada	Westside Warriors (BCHL)
3	71 (from Vancouver)	Josh Brittain	(LW)	Canada	Kingston Frontenacs (OHL)
3	83	Marco Cousineau	(G)	Canada	Baie-Comeau Drakkar (QMJHL)
3	85 (from Minnesota)	Brandon McMillan	(C)	Canada	Kelowna Rockets (WHL)
4	113	Ryan Hegarty	(D)	United States	U.S. National Team Development Program (NAHL)
5	143	Stefan Warg	(D)	Sweden	VIK Västerås HK (Sweden Jr.)
7	208 (from Philadelphia)	Nick Pryor	(D)	United States	U.S. National Team Development Program (NAHL)

== See also ==
- Anaheim Ducks
- Honda Center
- 2008–09 NHL season

=== Other Anaheim–based teams in 2008–09 ===
- Los Angeles Angels of Anaheim (Angel Stadium of Anaheim)
  - 2008 Los Angeles Angels of Anaheim season
  - 2009 Los Angeles Angels of Anaheim season

== Farm teams ==
Iowa Chops (AHL)
Bakersfield Condors (ECHL)
