= 2008–09 Edmonton Oilers season =

NHL team season

2008–09 Edmonton Oilers
- Division: 4th Northwest
- Conference: 11th Western
- 2008–09 record: 38–35–9
- Home record: 18–17–6
- Road record: 20–18–3
- Goals for: 234
- Goals against: 248

Team information
- General manager: Steve Tambellini
- Coach: Craig MacTavish
- Captain: Ethan Moreau
- Alternate captains: Ales Hemsky; Shawn Horcoff; Sheldon Souray; Steve Staios
- Arena: Rexall Place
- Average attendance: 16,839 (100%)
- Minor league affiliates: Springfield Falcons (AHL); Stockton Thunder (ECHL)

Team leaders
- Goals: Ales Hemsky (23); Sheldon Souray (23)
- Assists: Ales Hemsky (43)
- Points: Ales Hemsky (66)
- Penalty minutes: Zack Stortini (181)
- Plus/minus: Denis Grebeshkov (+12)
- Wins: Dwayne Roloson (28)
- Goals against average: Dwayne Roloson (2.77)

The 2008–09 Edmonton Oilers season was the team's 37th season of play, 30th as a member of the National Hockey League (NHL). Nonetheless, the Oilers celebrated their 30th anniversary The team would miss the playoffs for the third year in a row for the first time since the 1993–94 season and the 1995–96 season..

== Pre-season ==
- The NHL Board of Governors on June 18 approved the sale of the Edmonton Oilers. All 34 members of the Edmonton Investors Group agreed in February to sell the club for $200 million to Rexall pharmacy magnate Daryl Katz. The new owner has promised to keep the team in Edmonton and pursue getting a new arena to replace Rexall Place.
- On July 31, the Edmonton Oilers promoted Kevin Lowe to become president of hockey operations. They also announced that they have hired Steve Tambellini as their new general manager, and had also moved Kevin Prendergast, who was the vice-president of hockey operations, and named him the new assistant general manager.
- On Friday August 8, the Edmonton Oilers announced that Rick Olczyk has been promoted to the position of assistant general manager and director of hockey operations/legal affairs.

== Regular season ==
=== Divisional standings ===
Northwest Division
		GP	W	L	OTL	GF	GA	Pts
**1**	**y – Vancouver Canucks**	**82**	**45**	**27**	**10**	**246**	**220**	**100**
**2**	**Calgary Flames**	**82**	**46**	**30**	**6**	**254**	**248**	**98**
3	Minnesota Wild	82	40	33	9	219	200	**89**
4	Edmonton Oilers	82	38	35	9	234	248	**85**
5	Colorado Avalanche	82	32	45	5	199	257	**69**

=== Conference standings ===
Western Conference
R		Div	GP	W	L	OTL	GF	GA	Pts
**1**	**p – San Jose Sharks**	**PA**	**82**	**53**	**18**	**11**	**257**	**204**	117
**2**	**y – Detroit Red Wings**	**CE**	**82**	**51**	**21**	**10**	**295**	**244**	112
**3**	**y – Vancouver Canucks**	**NW**	**82**	**45**	**27**	**10**	**246**	**220**	100
**4**	**Chicago Blackhawks**	**CE**	**82**	**46**	**24**	**12**	**264**	**216**	104
**5**	**Calgary Flames**	**NW**	**82**	**46**	**30**	**6**	**254**	**248**	98
**6**	**St. Louis Blues**	**CE**	**82**	**41**	**31**	**10**	**233**	**233**	92
**7**	**Columbus Blue Jackets**	**CE**	**82**	**41**	**31**	**10**	**226**	**230**	92
**8**	**Anaheim Ducks**	**PA**	**82**	**42**	**33**	**7**	**245**	**238**	91
8.5
9	Minnesota Wild	NW	82	40	33	9	219	200	89
10	Nashville Predators	CE	82	40	34	8	213	233	88
11	Edmonton Oilers	NW	82	38	35	9	234	248	85
12	Dallas Stars	PA	82	36	35	11	230	257	83
13	Phoenix Coyotes	PA	82	36	39	7	208	252	79
14	Los Angeles Kings	PA	82	34	37	11	207	234	79
15	Colorado Avalanche	NW	82	32	45	5	199	257	69

bold – qualified for playoffs, y – division winner, p – Presidents' Trophy winner
CE – Central Division, NW – Northwest Division, PA – Pacific Division

== Schedule and results ==
2008–09 Game Log

October: 4–4–1 (Home: 2–0–1; Road: 2–4–0)
#	Date	Visitor	Score	Home	OT	Decision	Attendance	Record	Pts	Recap
1	October 12	Colorado Avalanche	2 – 3	Edmonton Oilers		Garon	16,839	1–0–0	2
2	October 15	Edmonton Oilers	3 – 2	Anaheim Ducks		Garon	16,604	2–0–0	4
3	October 17	Edmonton Oilers	4 – 3	Calgary Flames		Deslauriers	19,289	3–0–0	6
4	October 18	Calgary Flames	2 – 3	Edmonton Oilers		Garon	16,839	4–0–0	8
5	October 22	Edmonton Oilers	0 – 3	Chicago Blackhawks		Roloson	21,168	4–1–0	8
6	October 23	Edmonton Oilers	1 – 4	Colorado Avalanche		Garon	14,898	4–2–0	8
7	October 25	Edmonton Oilers	3 – 6	Vancouver Canucks		Garon	18,630	4–3–0	8
8	October 27	Boston Bruins	1 – 0	Edmonton Oilers	OT	Roloson	16,839	4–3–1	9
9	October 30	Edmonton Oilers	1 – 3	Nashville Predators		Garon	11,294	4–4–1	9

November: 6–7–1 (Home: 0–3–1; Road: 6–4–0)
#	Date	Visitor	Score	Home	OT	Decision	Attendance	Record	Pts	Recap
10	November 1	Edmonton Oilers	3 – 1	Carolina Hurricanes		Roloson	15,016	5–4–1	11
11	November 2	Edmonton Oilers	5 – 4	Philadelphia Flyers		Roloson	19,437	6–4–1	13
12	November 5	Edmonton Oilers	4 – 5	Columbus Blue Jackets		Roloson	11,228	6–5–1	13
13	November 6	Edmonton Oilers	4 – 5	Pittsburgh Penguins		Garon	16,971	6–6–1	13
14	November 9	Edmonton Oilers	2 – 1	New Jersey Devils		Deslauriers	14,193	7–6–1	15
15	November 10	Edmonton Oilers	3 – 2	New York Rangers	SO	Deslauriers	18,200	8–6–1	17
16	November 13	Toronto Maple Leafs	5 – 2	Edmonton Oilers		Deslauriers	16,839	8–7–1	17
17	November 15	Colorado Avalanche	3 – 2	Edmonton Oilers	SO	Roloson	16,839	8–7–2	18
18	November 17	Edmonton Oilers	0 – 4	Detroit Red Wings		Roloson	18,934	8–8–2	18
19	November 18	Edmonton Oilers	7 – 2	Columbus Blue Jackets		Roloson	12,689	9–8–2	20
20	November 20	Detroit Red Wings	4 – 3	Edmonton Oilers		Garon	16,839	9–9–2	20
21	November 26	Los Angeles Kings	2 – 1	Edmonton Oilers		Roloson	16,839	9–10–2	20
22	November 29	Edmonton Oilers	4 – 2	St. Louis Blues		Roloson	19,150	10–10–2	22
23	November 30	Edmonton Oilers	3 – 4	Dallas Stars		Deslauriers	16,650	10–11–2	22

December: 7–5–1 (Home: 4–3–1; Road: 3–2–0)
#	Date	Visitor	Score	Home	OT	Decision	Attendance	Record	Pts	Recap
24	December 3	Dallas Stars	2 – 5	Edmonton Oilers		Garon	16,839	11–11–2	24
25	December 5	Edmonton Oilers	5 – 4	Los Angeles Kings	SO	Garon	14,920	12–11–2	26
26	December 6	Edmonton Oilers	3 – 2	San Jose Sharks	OT	Roloson	17,496	13–11–2	28
27	December 11	Florida Panthers	2 – 0	Edmonton Oilers		Garon	16,839	13–12–2	28
28	December 13	Vancouver Canucks	0 – 3	Edmonton Oilers		Roloson	16,839	14–12–2	30
29	December 16	Chicago Blackhawks	9 – 2	Edmonton Oilers		Garon	16,839	14–13–2	30
30	December 17	Edmonton Oilers	2 – 4	Vancouver Canucks		Roloson	18,630	14–14–2	30
31	December 19	Anaheim Ducks	3 – 2	Edmonton Oilers	SO	Roloson	16,839	14–14–3	31
32	December 22	Phoenix Coyotes	2 – 4	Edmonton Oilers		Roloson	16,839	15–14–3	33
33	December 26	Edmonton Oilers	3 – 2	Vancouver Canucks		Roloson	18,630	16–14–3	35
34	December 28	Nashville Predators	2 – 5	Edmonton Oilers		Roloson	16,839	17–14–3	37
35	December 30	Ottawa Senators	3 – 2	Edmonton Oilers		Garon	16,839	17–15–3	37
36	December 31	Edmonton Oilers	4 – 6	Calgary Flames		Roloson	19,289	17–16–3	37

January: 8–4–0 (Home: 6–3–0; Road: 2–1–0)
#	Date	Visitor	Score	Home	OT	Decision	Attendance	Record	Pts	Recap
37	January 3	Dallas Stars	1 – 4	Edmonton Oilers		Roloson	16,839	18–16–3	39
38	January 5	New York Islanders	2 – 3	Edmonton Oilers		Roloson	16,839	19–16–3	41
39	January 7	Vancouver Canucks	4 – 2	Edmonton Oilers		Roloson	16,839	19–17–3	41
40	January 9	San Jose Sharks	4 – 1	Edmonton Oilers		Roloson	16,839	19–18–3	41
41	January 11	St. Louis Blues	1 – 2	Edmonton Oilers		Roloson	16,839	20–18–3	43
42	January 13	Edmonton Oilers	5 – 2	Washington Capitals		Roloson	17,498	21–18–3	45
43	January 15	Edmonton Oilers	1 – 5	Minnesota Wild		Roloson	18,568	21–19–3	45
44	January 16	Edmonton Oilers	3 – 2	Colorado Avalanche		Garon	15,681	22–19–3	47
45	January 18	Phoenix Coyotes	3 – 6	Edmonton Oilers		Roloson	16,839	23–19–3	49
46	January 20	Columbus Blue Jackets	3 – 4	Edmonton Oilers		Roloson	16,839	24–19–3	51
47	January 27	Buffalo Sabres	10 – 2	Edmonton Oilers		Roloson	16,839	24–20–3	53
48	January 30	Minnesota Wild	1 – 3	Edmonton Oilers		Roloson	16,839	25–20–3	53

February: 6–6–2 (Home: 3–3–1; Road: 3–3–1)
#	Date	Visitor	Score	Home	OT	Decision	Attendance	Record	Pts	Recap
49	February 1	Nashville Predators	2 – 1	Edmonton Oilers		Roloson	16,839	25–21–3	53
50	February 3	Chicago Blackhawks	3 – 1	Edmonton Oilers		Roloson	16,839	25–22–3	53
51	February 5	Edmonton Oilers	2 – 1	St. Louis Blues	SO	Roloson	15,668	26–22–3	55
52	February 7	Edmonton Oilers	3 – 8	Detroit Red Wings		Roloson	20,066	26–23–3	55
53	February 8	Edmonton Oilers	2 – 3	Minnesota Wild	SO	Roloson	18,568	26–23–4	56
54	February 11	Montreal Canadiens	2 – 7	Edmonton Oilers		Roloson	16,839	27–23–4	58
55	February 14	Edmonton Oilers	3 – 2	Los Angeles Kings	SO	Roloson	18,118	28–23–4	60
56	February 16	Edmonton Oilers	3 – 1	Phoenix Coyotes		Roloson	14,547	29–23–4	62
57	February 17	Edmonton Oilers	2 – 4	San Jose Sharks		Roloson	17,496	29–24–4	62
58	February 19	Edmonton Oilers	2 – 4	Dallas Stars		Roloson	17,792	29–25–4	62
59	February 21	Calgary Flames	3 – 2	Edmonton Oilers	SO	Roloson	16,839	29–25–5	63
60	February 24	Tampa Bay Lightning	3 – 5	Edmonton Oilers		Roloson	16,839	30–25–5	65
61	February 26	Columbus Blue Jackets	1 – 0	Edmonton Oilers		Roloson	16,839	30–26–5	65
62	February 28	Minnesota Wild	2 – 3	Edmonton Oilers		Roloson	16,839	31–26–5	67

March: 5–6–4 (Home: 1–3–2; Road: 4–3–2)
#	Date	Visitor	Score	Home	OT	Decision	Attendance	Record	Pts	Recap
63	March 3	Edmonton Oilers	5 – 6	Nashville Predators	OT	Roloson	14,194	31–26–6	68
64	March 5	Edmonton Oilers	2 – 4	Ottawa Senators		Roloson	17,904	31–27–6	68
65	March 7	Edmonton Oilers	4 – 1	Toronto Maple Leafs		Roloson	19,364	32–27–6	70
66	March 10	Edmonton Oilers	3 – 4	Montreal Canadiens	OT	Roloson	21,273	32–27–7	71
67	March 12	Atlanta Thrashers	4 – 3	Edmonton Oilers	OT	Roloson	16,839	32–27–8	72
68	March 14	Colorado Avalanche	3 – 2	Edmonton Oilers	OT	Roloson	16,839	32–27–9	73
69	March 17	St. Louis Blues	1 – 2	Edmonton Oilers	SO	Roloson	16,839	33–27–9	75
70	March 19	Edmonton Oilers	8 – 1	Colorado Avalanche		Roloson	13,612	34–27–9	77
71	March 20	Edmonton Oilers	5 – 4	Chicago Blackhawks	SO	Roloson	22,151	35–27–9	79
72	March 22	Edmonton Oilers	0 – 3	Minnesota Wild		Roloson	18,568	35–28–9	79
73	March 24	Detroit Red Wings	3 – 2	Edmonton Oilers		Roloson	16,839	35–29–9	79
74	March 26	Edmonton Oilers	2 – 3	Phoenix Coyotes		Roloson	14,337	35–30–9	79
75	March 27	Edmonton Oilers	5 – 3	Anaheim Ducks		Roloson	17,257	36–30–9	81
76	March 29	Minnesota Wild	3 – 2	Edmonton Oilers		Roloson	16,839	36–31–9	81
77	March 31	Anaheim Ducks	5 – 3	Edmonton Oilers		Roloson	16,839	36–32–9	81

April: 2–3–0 (Home: 2–2–0; Road: 0–1–0)
#	Date	Visitor	Score	Home	OT	Decision	Attendance	Record	Pts	Recap
78	April 2	San Jose Sharks	2 – 1	Edmonton Oilers		Roloson	16,839	36–33–9	81
79	April 4	Vancouver Canucks	3 – 5	Edmonton Oilers		Roloson	16,839	37–33–9	83
80	April 7	Los Angeles Kings	2 – 1	Edmonton Oilers		Roloson	16,839	37–34–9	83
81	April 10	Calgary Flames	1 – 5	Edmonton Oilers		Deslauriers	16,839	38–34–9	85
82	April 11	Edmonton Oilers	1 – 4	Calgary Flames		Deslauriers	19,289	38–35–9	85

Legend: Win (2 points) Loss (0 points) Overtime/shootout loss (1 point)

Schedule

== Player statistics ==
=== Skaters ===
Note: Pos = Position; GP = Games played; G = Goals; A = Assists; Pts = Points; PIM = Penalty minutes; +/- = Plus/minus; PPG = Power-play goals; SHG = Short-handed goals; GWG = Game-winning goals

Regular season

Player	GP	G	A	Pts	+/−	PIM
Ales Hemsky	72	23	43	66	+1	32
Sheldon Souray	81	23	30	53	+1	98
Shawn Horcoff	80	17	36	53	+7	39
Tom Gilbert	82	5	40	45	+6	26
Sam Gagner	76	16	25	41	-1	51
Denis Grebeshkov	72	7	32	39	+12	38
Andrew Cogliano	82	18	20	38	-6	22
Dustin Penner	78	17	20	37	+7	61
Lubomir Visnovsky	50	8	23	31	+6	30
Robert Nilsson	64	9	20	29	+1	26
Erik Cole^{‡}	63	16	11	27	-3	63
Kyle Brodziak	79	11	16	27	+4	21
Ethan Moreau	77	14	12	26	0	133
Marc-Antoine Pouliot	63	8	12	20	+1	23
Fernando Pisani	38	7	8	15	-1	14
Steve Staios	80	2	12	14	-5	92
Liam Reddox	46	5	7	12	-6	10
Ales Kotalik^{†}	19	7	4	11	+2	6
Zack Stortini	52	6	5	11	-3	181
Ladislav Smid	60	0	11	11	-6	57
Jason Strudwick	71	2	7	9	-4	60
Patrick O'Sullivan^{†}	19	2	4	6	-7	12
Rob Schremp	4	0	3	3	+2	2
Gilbert Brule	11	2	1	3	-3	12
Ryan Potulny	8	0	3	3	+2	0
Steve MacIntyre	22	2	0	2	-2	40
Jean-Francois Jacques	7	1	0	1	0	9
Jesse Boulerice	2	0	0	0	0	0
Tim Sestito	1	0	0	0	0	0
Theo Peckham	15	0	0	0	-1	59
Taylor Chorney	2	0	0	0	-4	0

=== Goaltenders ===
Note: Pos = Position;GP = Games played; Min, TOI = Minutes played; W = Wins; L = Losses; T,T/OT = Ties; OTL = Overtime losses; GA = Goals-against; GAA = Goals-against average; SO = Shutouts; SA = Shots against; SV = Shots saved; SV% = Save percentage;

Regular season

Player	GP	Min	W	L	OT	GA	GAA	SA	SV	Sv%	SO
Dwayne Roloson	63	3596	28	24	9	166	2.77	1953	1787	.915	1
Mathieu Garon^{‡}	15	814	8	9	0	43	3.17	408	365	.895	0
Jeff Deslauriers	10	539	4	3	0	30	3.34	302	272	.901	0

^{†}Denotes player spent time with another team before joining Oilers. Stats reflect time with Oilers only.
^{‡}Traded mid-season. Stats reflect time with Oilers only.

== Awards and records ==
=== Records ===
- 39 Years, 177 Days: an NHL record for the oldest goaltender ever played 60 games or more in a season by Dwayne Roloson.
  - 39 Years, 170 Days: A new NHL record for the oldest goaltender ever played 60 games or more in a season by Dwayne Roloson on March 31, 2009.
- 36: Oilers record for most consecutive starts by Dwayne Roloson.
  - 21: A new Oilers record for most consecutive starts by Dwayne Roloson on March 7, 2009.

=== Milestones ===
Regular Season
Player	Milestone	Reached
Dustin Penner	100th NHL Point	October 12, 2008
Lubomir Visnovsky	500th NHL Game	October 12, 2008
Steve MacIntyre	1st NHL Game	October 15, 2008
Jeff Deslauriers	1st NHL Game; 1st NHL Win	October 17, 2008
Sheldon Souray	200th NHL Point	October 17, 2008
Kyle Brodziak	100th NHL Game	October 18, 2008
Dwayne Roloson	400th NHL Game	October 22, 2008
Ladislav Smid	100th NHL PIM	October 22, 2008
Tom Gilbert	100th NHL Game	October 23, 2008
Ales Hemsky	200th NHL Assist	October 23, 2008
Zack Stortini	100th NHL Game	October 25, 2008
Jeff Deslauriers	1st NHL Assist; 1st NHL Point	November 9, 2008
Jason Strudwick	500th NHL Game	November 10, 2008
Ethan Moreau	900th NHL PIM	November 15, 2008
Liam Reddox	1st NHL Goal; 1st NHL Point	November 15, 2008
Andrew Cogliano	100th NHL Game	November 17, 2008
Dustin Penner	200th NHL Game	November 18, 2008
Shawn Horcoff	500th NHL Game	November 20, 2008
Tim Sestito	1st NHL Game	November 26, 2008
Sam Gagner	100th NHL Game	November 29, 2008
Marc-Antoine Pouliot	100th NHL Game	November 29, 2008
Shawn Horcoff	300th NHL Point; 1st NHL Gordie Howe hat trick	November 29, 2008
Steve Staios	1,100th NHL PIM	November 29, 2008
Rob Schremp	1st NHL Assist; 1st NHL Point	December 3, 2008
Liam Reddox	1st NHL Assist	December 16, 2008
Jason Strudwick	700th NHL PIM	December 22, 2008
Ales Hemsky	300th NHL Point	December 26, 2008
Lubomir Visnovsky	300th NHL Point	December 28, 2008
Sheldon Souray	900th NHL PIM	December 30, 2008
Shawn Horcoff	200th NHL Assist	January 3, 2009
Zack Stortini	400th NHL PIM	January 3, 2009
Erik Cole	300th NHL Point	January 13, 2009
Steve MacIntyre	1st NHL Goal; 1st NHL Point	January 13, 2009
Steve Staios	800th NHL Game	January 15, 2009
Mathieu Garon	200th NHL Game	January 16, 2009
Ethan Moreau	1st NHL Hat-trick	January 18, 2009
Ales Hemsky	400th NHL Game	February 26, 2009
Jean-Francois Jacques	1st NHL Goal; 1st NHL Point	March 3, 2009
Sheldon Souray	600th NHL Game	March 17, 2009
Sam Gagner	1st NHL Hat-trick	March 19, 2009
Ladislav Smid	200th NHL Game	March 26, 2009
Ethan Moreau	1,000 NHL PIM	March 27, 2009
Patrick O'Sullivan	200th NHL Game	March 27, 2009

== Transactions ==
The Oilers have been involved in the following transactions during the 2008–09 season.

=== Trades ===
Date	Details
June 6, 2008	To Philadelphia Flyers Danny Syvret	To Edmonton Oilers Ryan Potulny
June 29, 2008	To Los Angeles Kings Jarret Stoll; Matt Greene	To Edmonton Oilers Lubomir Visnovsky
July 1, 2008	To Carolina Hurricanes Joni Pitkanen	To Edmonton Oilers Erik Cole
July 1, 2008	To Columbus Blue Jackets Raffi Torres	To Edmonton Oilers Gilbert Brule
January 29, 2009	To Pittsburgh Penguins Mathieu Garon	To Edmonton Oilers Dany Sabourin; Ryan Stone; 4th round pick in 2011
March 4, 2009	To Buffalo Sabres 2nd round pick in 2009	To Edmonton Oilers Ales Kotalik
March 4, 2009	To Carolina Hurricanes Erik Cole; 5th round pick in 2009	To Edmonton Oilers Patrick O'Sullivan; 2nd round pick in 2009

=== Free agents acquired ===
Date	Player	Former team	Contract Terms
July 10, 2008	Jason Strudwick	New York Rangers	1 year, $650,000
July 15, 2008	Carl Corazzini	Detroit Red Wings	1 year, $500,000

=== Free agents lost ===
Date	Player	New team	Contract Terms
July 2, 2008	Curtis Glencross	Calgary Flames	3 years, $3.6 million
July 7, 2008	Ryan Flinn	Montreal Canadiens	1 year, $500,000
July 8, 2008	T. J. Kemp	Pittsburgh Penguins	1 year
July 17, 2008	Marty Reasoner	Atlanta Thrashers	1 year, $1 million
July 22, 2008	Troy Bodie	Anaheim Ducks	1 year, $500,000

=== Waivers ===
Date	Player	Team	Ref
September 30, 2008	Steve MacIntyre	from Florida Panthers	
November 11, 2008	Jesse Boulerice	from Colorado Avalanche	
November 21, 2008	Jesse Boulerice	to Colorado Avalanche	

=== Player signings ===
Player	Contract terms
Tom Gilbert	6 years, $24 million
Robert Nilsson	3 years, $6 million
Denis Grebeshkov	1 year, $1.5 million
Ryan Potulny	1 year, $645,000
Marc-Antoine Pouliot	2 years, $1.65 million
Jean-Francois Jacques	2 years, $1.05 million
Zack Stortini	3 years, $2.1 million

== Draft picks ==
Round	#	Player	Nationality	NHL team	College/Junior/Club team (League)
1	22	Jordan Eberle (C)	Canada	Edmonton Oilers (from Anaheim Ducks)	Regina Pats (WHL)
4	103	Johan Motin (D)	Sweden	Edmonton Oilers	Bofors IK (Sweden-2)
5	133	Philippe Cornet (LW)	Canada	Edmonton Oilers	Rimouski Océanic (QMJHL)
6	163	Teemu Hartikainen (C)	Finland	Edmonton Oilers	KalPa (Finland Jr.)
7	193	Jordan Bendfeld (D)	Canada	Edmonton Oilers	Medicine Hat Tigers (WHL)

== See also ==
- 2008–09 NHL season
