= Mike Brown (ice hockey, born 1985) =

American ice hockey player (born 1985)

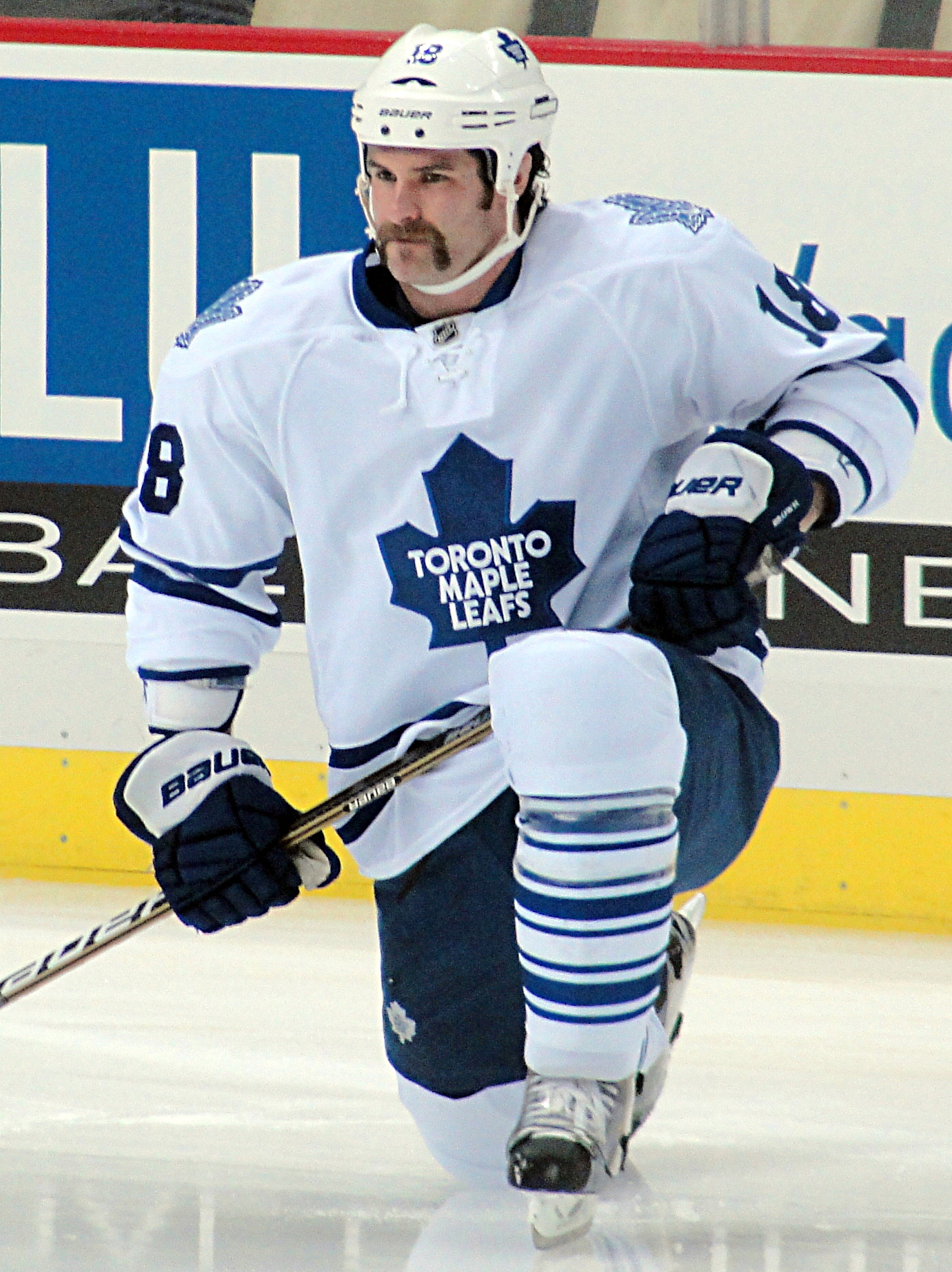
- Brown with the Maple Leafs in 2012
- Born: June 24, 1985 (age 41) Northbrook, Illinois, U.S.
- Height: 5 ft 11 in (180 cm)
- Weight: 205 lb (93 kg; 14 st 9 lb)
- Position: Right wing
- Shot: Right
- Played for: Vancouver Canucks; Anaheim Ducks; Toronto Maple Leafs; Edmonton Oilers; San Jose Sharks; Montreal Canadiens
- National team: United States
- NHL draft: 159th overall, 2004; Vancouver Canucks
- Playing career: 2005–2017

Michael Steven Brown (born June 24, 1985) is an American former professional ice hockey right winger.

Coming out of the United States National Team Development Program and the University of Michigan Wolverines, Brown was drafted by the Vancouver Canucks in 2004.

== Playing career ==
=== Amateur ===
As a youth, Brown played in the 1999 Quebec International Pee-Wee Hockey Tournament with the Chicago Young Americans minor ice hockey team. Before attending the University of Michigan for two years, Brown was a member of the US National Development Team Program, competing in the North American Hockey League (NAHL). He was drafted in the 5th round, 159th overall, by the Vancouver Canucks in the 2004 NHL entry draft.

=== Professional ===
Brown became one of two Mike Browns to have been part of the Canucks organization and was often mistaken for the latter, a forward who left the Canucks in 2002. Following his sophomore season, he was signed to a professional contract with the Canucks and chose to forgo his last two years of college hockey. In his pro rookie season in 2005–06 with the Manitoba Moose, the Canucks' American Hockey League (AHL) affiliate, he recorded 15 points in 73 games. He was suspended for two games after an illegal high hit in a game versus the Houston Aeros. In 2007–08, he received his first NHL call-up, playing 19 games for the Canucks. Brown scored his first NHL goal on December 2, 2007, against the Minnesota Wild in just his third game with the Canucks, deflecting a point shot from defenceman Lukáš Krajíček in a 2–1 loss. He was sent back down to the Moose on January 17, 2008.

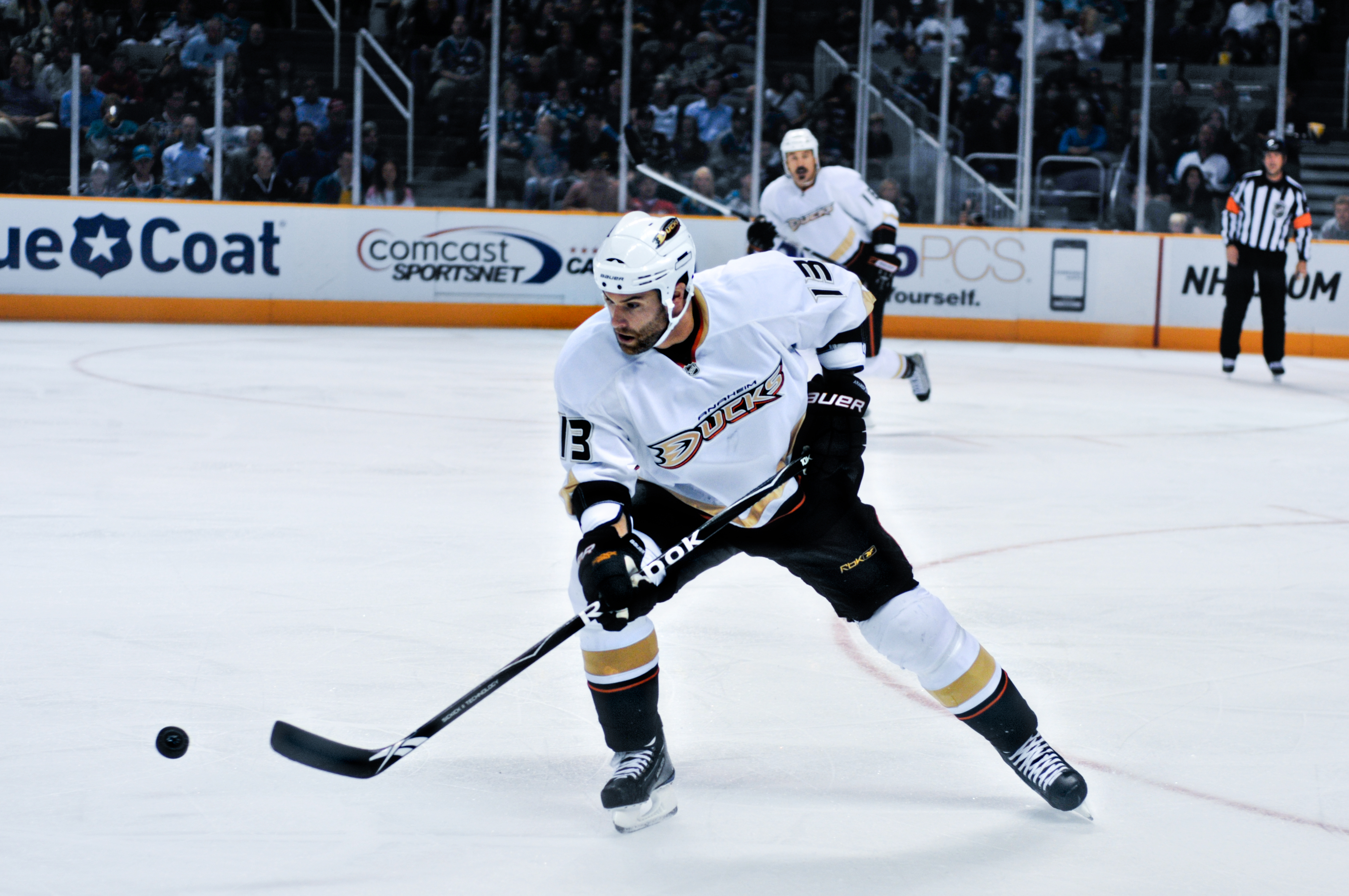
Brown in a preseason game against San Jose Sharks in 2009.

The following season, Brown played in 20 games for the Canucks, registering one point. On February 4, 2009, Brown was traded by the Canucks to the Anaheim Ducks in exchange for Nathan McIver. He finished the season with the Ducks having played in 8 games scoring one goal and two points. On May 1, 2009, Brown was ejected from Game 1 of the Western Conference Semi-finals after a questionable hit on then-Detroit Red Wings forward Jiří Hudler, who was left dazed and bloodied on the ice. Brown was not suspended for the hit, but the Red Wings ultimately won the series in seven games. He finished with two points in the Ducks series loss. Following the season he was re-signed to a two-year contract extension.

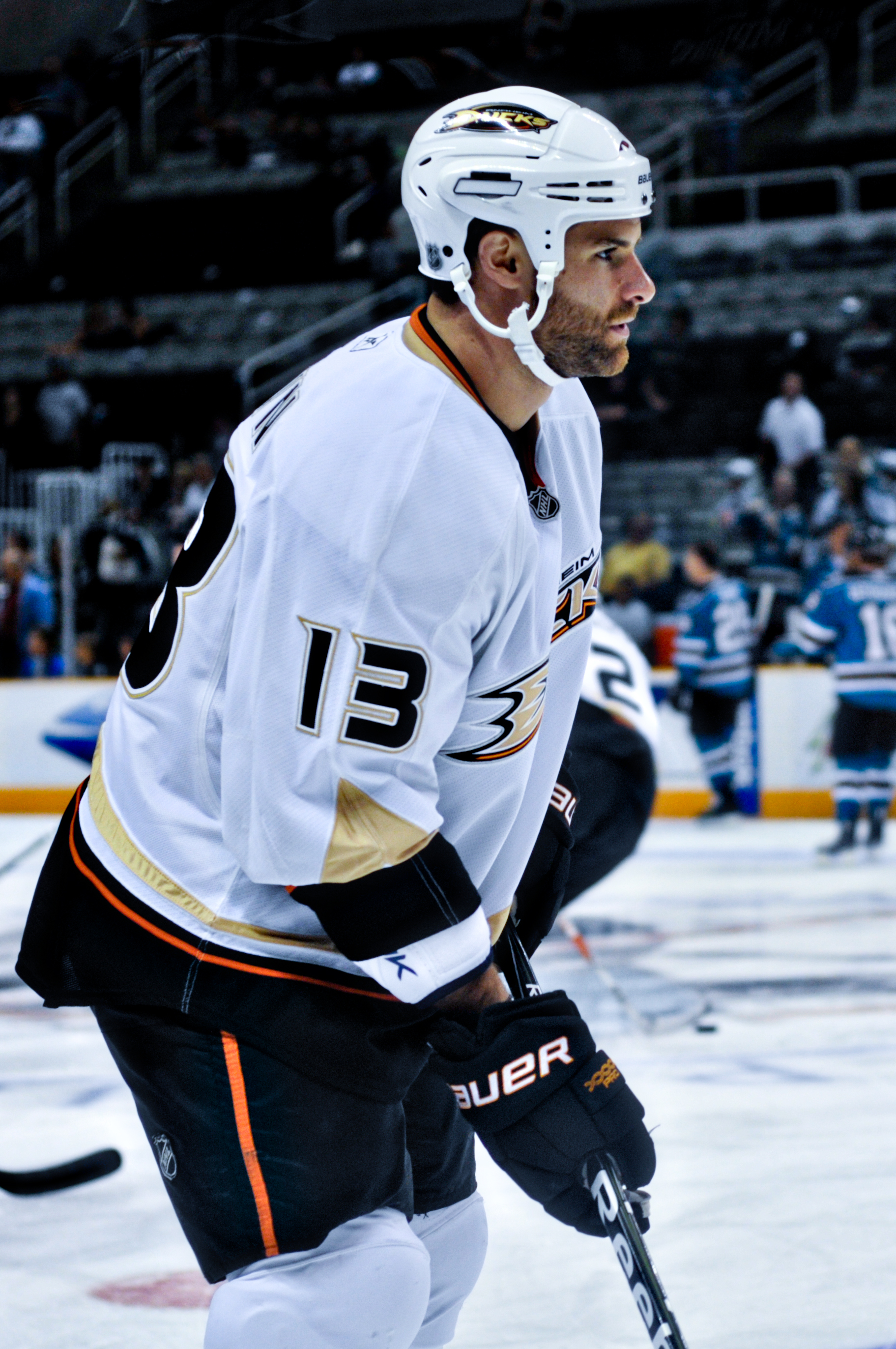
Brown with the Anaheim Ducks in 2010

In the 2009–10 season, Brown played in a career-high 75 games, posting six goals and recording 106 penalty minutes. On June 26, 2010, at the 2010 NHL entry draft, he was traded to the Toronto Maple Leafs in exchange for the Leafs' fifth round pick, 122nd overall. The Leafs general manager Brian Burke acquired Brown to protect his teammates on the ice and to bring toughness to the team. On February 2, 2011, Brown signed a three-year contract extension with the Leafs.

During the shortened 2012–13 season, on March 4, 2013, Brown was traded to the Edmonton Oilers in exchange for a conditional fourth round pick in the 2014 Draft. He was traded by the Leafs in order to make room for the return of Matt Frattin from injury. He scored his first goal as an Oiler on March 10, 2013, against the Chicago Blackhawks. Brown's first period goal broke a two-game goalless drought for the Oilers. Brown played in a total of 35 games with the Oilers over two season, scoring just once. He was traded to the San Jose Sharks on October 21, 2013, in exchange for a fourth round pick in 2014 Draft.

In the offseason, Brown was re-signed by the Sharks to a two-year contract. During the 2015–16 season, Brown was placed on waivers after 44 games with the Sharks and was claimed by the Montreal Canadiens on February 29, 2016. He was brought in by the Canadiens to protect the younger star players on the roster. He completed the season remaining on the Canadiens roster, scoring his first goal (a game winner) on March 23 versus the Anaheim Ducks.

As a free agent over the summer, Brown went un-signed before agreeing on a try-out basis to attend the training camp of the Columbus Blue Jackets on September 13, 2016. He was released from his try-out at the conclusion of training camp by the Blue Jackets and remained a free agent into the 2016–17 season. On December 20, 2016, Brown belatedly signed a professional try-out ("PTO") contract with the Blue Jackets affiliate, the Cleveland Monsters of the AHL. After 11 scoreless games, he was released from his PTO with Cleveland on February 12, 2017.

== Personal life ==
Brown is Jewish. He was one of four Jewish players in the NHL in November 2008, along with Michael Cammalleri, Jeff Halpern and Eric Nystrom.

Brown was raised in Northbrook, Illinois. He attended Glenbrook North High School. His parents, Barry and Audrey Brown, used to own several Harley Davidson dealerships in Chicago until they got seized by Corporate. Through the family business, Brown got to know several players from the Chicago Blackhawks growing up. When he was called up for his first game by the Canucks, Blackhawk Jeremy Roenick called to wish him good luck.

== Career statistics ==
=== Regular season and playoffs ===
			Regular season					Playoffs
Season	Team	League	GP	G	A	Pts	PIM	GP	G	A	Pts	PIM
2001–02	U.S. NTDP U17	USDP	17	6	4	10	13	—	—	—	—	—
2001–02	U.S. NTDP U18	NAHL	46	5	11	16	56	—	—	—	—	—
2002–03	U.S. NTDP U18	NAHL	9	0	3	3	29	—	—	—	—	—
2002–03	U.S. NTDP U18	USDP	34	5	3	8	16	—	—	—	—	—
2003–04	University of Michigan	CCHA	42	8	5	13	51	—	—	—	—	—
2004–05	University of Michigan	CCHA	35	3	5	8	95	—	—	—	—	—
2005–06	Manitoba Moose	AHL	73	7	8	15	139	13	1	2	3	17
2006–07	Manitoba Moose	AHL	62	3	0	3	194	13	0	2	2	16
2007–08	Manitoba Moose	AHL	54	10	3	13	201	6	2	0	2	11
2007–08	Vancouver Canucks	NHL	19	1	0	1	55	—	—	—	—	—
2008–09	Vancouver Canucks	NHL	20	0	1	1	85	—	—	—	—	—
2008–09	Anaheim Ducks	NHL	28	2	1	3	60	13	0	2	2	25
2009–10	Anaheim Ducks	NHL	75	6	1	7	106	—	—	—	—	—
2010–11	Toronto Maple Leafs	NHL	50	3	5	8	69	—	—	—	—	—
2011–12	Toronto Maple Leafs	NHL	50	2	2	4	74	—	—	—	—	—
2012–13	Toronto Maple Leafs	NHL	12	0	1	1	70	—	—	—	—	—
2012–13	Edmonton Oilers	NHL	27	1	0	1	53	—	—	—	—	—
2013–14	Edmonton Oilers	NHL	8	0	0	0	19	—	—	—	—	—
2013–14	San Jose Sharks	NHL	48	2	3	5	75	6	1	1	2	26
2014–15	San Jose Sharks	NHL	12	0	0	0	22	—	—	—	—	—
2015–16	San Jose Sharks	NHL	44	1	2	3	63	—	—	—	—	—
2015–16	Montreal Canadiens	NHL	14	1	1	2	27	—	—	—	—	—
2016–17	Cleveland Monsters	AHL	11	0	0	0	2	—	—	—	—	—
AHL totals			200	20	11	31	536	32	3	4	7	44
NHL totals			407	19	17	36	778	19	1	3	4	51

=== International ===
Year	Team	Event	Result	GP	G	A	Pts	PIM
2003	United States	WJC18	4th	6	0	0	0	12
2005	United States	WJC	4th	7	1	1	2	2
2011	United States	WC	8th	7	0	0	0	0
Junior totals				13	1	1	2	14
Senior totals				7	0	0	0	0

== See also ==
- List of select Jewish ice hockey players
