= Nathan McIver =

Canadian ice hockey player (born 1985)

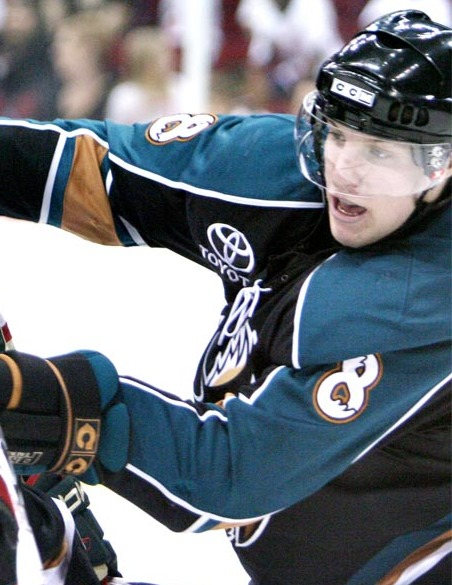
- McIver with the Manitoba Moose in 2008
- Born: January 6, 1985 (age 41) Kinkora, Prince Edward Island, Canada
- Height: 6 ft 2 in (188 cm)
- Weight: 195 lb (88 kg; 13 st 13 lb)
- Position: Defence
- Shot: Left
- Played for: Vancouver Canucks; Anaheim Ducks
- NHL draft: 254th overall, 2003; Vancouver Canucks
- Playing career: 2005–2016

Nathan McIver (born January 6, 1985) is a Canadian former professional ice hockey defenceman. He played major junior in the Ontario Hockey League (OHL) where he was drafted 254th overall by the Vancouver Canucks in the 2003 NHL entry draft. McIver played in the National Hockey League (NHL) with the Canucks and the Anaheim Ducks. He is known as an agitator and a fighter. He was an assistant coach for the Newfoundland Growlers of the ECHL, and is now with Ottawa Senators, as assistant coach with Belleville Senators for the 2023–24 season.

== Career ==
Selected in the second round of the Ontario Hockey League (OHL) Priority Draft, McIver played three seasons for the Toronto St. Michael's Majors establishing himself as a stay-at-home defenceman. In his third and final season with Toronto, he recorded 26 points and appeared on the OHL's Third All-Star Team.

Drafted in the 2003 NHL entry draft, 254th overall, by the Vancouver Canucks, he made his professional debut in the American Hockey League (AHL) in 2005–06 with the Manitoba Moose. During his AHL season, McIver made his NHL debut with the Canucks, called up in lieu of injury trouble. With more injuries on the Canucks' blueline in 2007–08, McIver appeared increasingly for Vancouver, playing in 17 games.

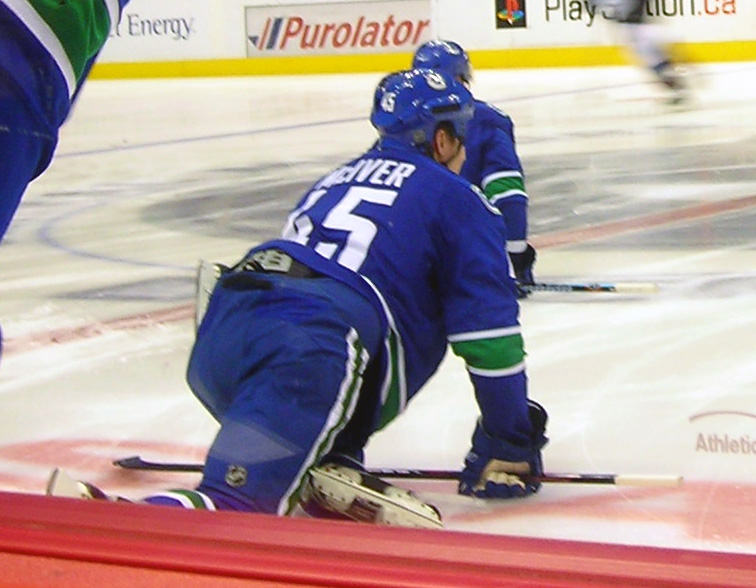
McIver with the Vancouver Canucks in 2008

During the 2008–09 preseason, McIver was assigned to the Moose. However, required to clear waivers, McIver instead was claimed by the Anaheim Ducks. Making his Ducks debut on October 14, 2008, he recorded his first NHL point, an assist in a game against the Los Angeles Kings. He went on to play 18 games for the Ducks, before being traded back to the Canucks in exchange for right winger Mike Brown on February 4, 2009. Back in the Canucks organization, McIver returned to the Moose to finish the season. Becoming a free agent in the off-season, he was re-signed by the Canucks to a one-year, two-way contract worth $577,000 at the NHL level and $95,000 in the minors.

On July 3, 2010, McIver left the Canucks and signed a two-year contract as a free agent with the Boston Bruins organization.

With limited NHL interest, he accepted a try-out to the AHL's Hamilton Bulldogs training camp for the 2013–14 season. On December 13, 2013, McIver signed an AHL contract to remain with the Bulldogs for the remainder of the campaign.

McIver was not retained by the Bulldogs at the end of the season and on September 12, 2014, the AHL's Norfolk Admirals announced they had signed him. On July 23, 2015, McIver signed his first professional contract abroad, agreeing to a one-year contract with Scottish club, the Braehead Clan, of the Elite Ice Hockey League. He retired following the completion of the contract in 2016.

On July 19, 2016, McIver was hired by the Oshawa Generals of the Ontario Hockey League as an assistant coach. In 2021, he was hired as an assistant coach of the Newfoundland Growlers, the ECHL affiliate of the Toronto Maple Leafs. On July 4, 2023, He was introduced to the Belleville Senators coaching staff.

== Career statistics ==
			Regular season					Playoffs
Season	Team	League	GP	G	A	Pts	PIM	GP	G	A	Pts	PIM
2001–02	Summerside Western Capitals	MJAHL	48	5	5	10	98	0	0	0	0	0
2002–03	Toronto St. Michael's Majors	OHL	68	5	10	15	121	19	0	4	4	41
2003–04	Toronto St. Michael's Majors	OHL	57	4	11	15	183	16	0	1	1	22
2004–05	Toronto St. Michael's Majors	OHL	67	4	22	26	160	3	0	1	1	13
2005–06	Manitoba Moose	AHL	66	1	6	7	155	12	0	0	0	28
2006–07	Manitoba Moose	AHL	63	1	2	3	139	2	0	0	0	0
2006–07	Vancouver Canucks	NHL	1	0	0	0	7	—	—	—	—	—
2007–08	Manitoba Moose	AHL	43	3	3	6	108	6	0	1	1	11
2007–08	Vancouver Canucks	NHL	17	0	0	0	52	—	—	—	—	—
2008–09	Anaheim Ducks	NHL	18	0	1	1	36	—	—	—	—	—
2008–09	Manitoba Moose	AHL	28	0	2	2	59	10	0	0	0	10
2009–10	Manitoba Moose	AHL	44	1	4	5	109	—	—	—	—	—
2010–11	Providence Bruins	AHL	60	0	3	3	176	—	—	—	—	—
2011–12	Providence Bruins	AHL	41	1	0	1	68	—	—	—	—	—
2012–13	Bridgeport Sound Tigers	AHL	62	1	4	5	287	—	—	—	—	—
2013–14	Hamilton Bulldogs	AHL	40	0	3	3	111	—	—	—	—	—
2014–15	Norfolk Admirals	AHL	61	2	1	3	174	—	—	—	—	—
2015–16	Braehead Clan	EIHL	59	3	6	9	113	2	0	0	0	6
AHL totals			508	10	28	38	1386	30	0	1	1	49
NHL totals			36	0	1	1	95	—	—	—	—	—

== Awards and honours ==
Award	Year
OHL
Third All-Star Team	2005

== Transactions ==
- June 21, 2003 – Drafted 254th overall by the Vancouver Canucks in the 2003 NHL entry draft.
- February 4, 2009 – Traded by the Anaheim Ducks to the Vancouver Canucks in exchange for Mike Brown.
- September 1, 2009 – Re-signed by the Vancouver Canucks to a one-year, two-way contract worth $577,000.
- July 3, 2010 – Signed as a free agent by the Boston Bruins to a two-year contract.
