= 2008–09 NHL season =

National Hockey League season

- League: National Hockey League
- Sport: Ice hockey
- Duration: October 4, 2008 – June 12, 2009
- Games: 82
- Teams: 30
- TV partner(s): CBC, TSN, RDS (Canada); Versus, NBC (United States)

Draft
- Top draft pick: Steven Stamkos
- Picked by: Tampa Bay Lightning

Regular season
- Presidents' Trophy: San Jose Sharks
- Season MVP: Alexander Ovechkin (Capitals)
- Top scorer: Evgeni Malkin (Penguins)

Playoffs
- Playoffs MVP: Evgeni Malkin (Penguins)

Stanley Cup
- Champions: Pittsburgh Penguins
- Runners-up: Detroit Red Wings

NHL seasons
- 2007–08 2009–10

The 2008–09 NHL season was the 92nd season of operation (91st season of play) of the National Hockey League (NHL). It was the first season since prior to the 2004–05 lockout in which every team played each other at least once during the season, following three seasons where teams only played against two divisions in the other conference (one division at home and one on the road). It began on October 4, with the regular season ending on April 12. The Stanley Cup playoffs ended on June 12, with the Pittsburgh Penguins taking the Stanley Cup over the defending champion Detroit Red Wings. The Montreal Canadiens hosted the 57th NHL All-Star Game at the Bell Centre on January 25, 2009, as part of the Canadiens' 100th season celebration.

== League business ==
=== Increase in salary cap ===
National Hockey League announced that the regular season salary cap would be going up for the fourth straight season. The 2008–09 salary cap is being increased by $6,400,000 (US) per team to bring the salary cap up to $56,700,000 (US). The salary floor is at $40,700,000 (US), which is higher than the salary cap on 2005–06 season.

=== Rule changes ===
The NHL brought in a number of rule changes for the start of the 2008–09 NHL season aimed at increasing offence and safety. The first rule change was to Rule 76.2 on faceoffs. The first faceoff of a power play will now be in the defending zone of the team that committed the foul, regardless of where the play was stopped. The second rule dealt with the issue of safety while players are pursuing the puck on a potential icing call. Rule 81.1 states that, "Any contact between opposing players while pursuing the puck on an icing must be for the sole purpose of playing the puck and not for eliminating the opponent from playing the puck. Unnecessary or dangerous contact could result in penalties being assessed to the offending player." The third rule change also dealt with faceoff position: if a puck is shot off the goal frame, goal post or crossbar, the subsequent faceoff will remain in the end zone where the puck went out of play. Another rule change prohibits TV commercials, game breaks, and any line changes immediately after an icing call.

=== Return to pre-lockout schedule ===
The 2008–09 schedule returns to the pre-lockout schedule. The new schedule eliminates the three-year rotation where teams would only play teams in two of the three divisions of the opposite conference; instead the new schedule guarantees that each team plays every other team at least once. In this new schedule, each team played their divisional rivals six times for a total of 24 games; they played all other conference teams four times for a total of 40 games, and played every team in the opposite conference at least once for a total of 15 games. To obtain a total of 82 games there are an additional three-wild card games; for the Canadian teams, the three-wild card games are composed of playing the three Canadian teams in the opposite conference an additional time.

=== Entry draft ===
The 2008 NHL entry draft was held on June 20–21, 2008, at Scotiabank Place in Ottawa, Ontario, the home of the Ottawa Senators. Steven Stamkos was selected first overall by the Tampa Bay Lightning.

=== Trade deadline ===
The NHL and National Hockey League Players' Association (NHLPA) agreed to move the trade deadline from Tuesday, March 3, 2009, to Wednesday, March 4, 2009. This was done mainly because the schedule has twelve games on March 3 and only two on March 4.

=== General Managers' meeting ===
At the meeting, held in Naples, Florida from March 9–11, 2009, general managers of the teams discussed issues that concerned them. Consensus on any topic would lead to action by the Board of Governors or the Competition committee in later meetings. Paul Kelly, executive director of the NHLPA, made a presentation on the topic of dangerous hits to the head, proposing new rules to penalize intentional hits. The general managers could not agree on the planned rule change and took no further action. Kelly intends to review the issue at the future Competition committee meeting, which is held after the Stanley Cup Finals. The general managers also discussed the topic of fighting in hockey, and agreed to penalize further players who start fights directly after face-offs and to further enforce the existing 'instigator' rule. The managers agreed to award a second-round compensatory pick in the 2009 entry draft to the New York Rangers due to the death of Alexei Cherepanov.

== Regular season ==
=== European openers ===
The regular season started with four games played in Europe. The Ottawa Senators and the Pittsburgh Penguins played each other twice in Stockholm, Sweden with the two teams splitting a two-game premiere, and the New York Rangers and the Tampa Bay Lightning played each other twice in Prague, Czech Republic. The Rangers swept Tampa Bay 2–0, going on to represent the NHL in the inaugural Victoria Cup challenge game as part of the club's pre-season schedule. The four teams also played some pre-season exhibition games in Europe.

Other than the four overseas regular season games starting October 4, October 9 was the actual first day of regular season games as far as widespread continental North American broadcast from most providers, including pay per view hockey packages. Other teams still played preseason games between October 4 and 6.

By February 23, 2009, all four teams who started the season in Europe had fired their coaches.

=== Winter Classic ===
Because of the success of the 2008 Winter Classic, another outdoor game was held in the 2008–09 NHL season. While Yankee Stadium was considered an early favorite, in a game to be hosted by the Rangers, cold-weather issues involving the old stadium put that location out of the mix. Another site considered was Beaver Stadium at Penn State University, with that game to likely involve the Penguins and the Flyers.

On May 29, 2008, TSN reported that the 2009 NHL Winter Classic would be held in Chicago, Illinois on January 1, 2009, played between the Chicago Blackhawks and defending champion Detroit Red Wings. Soldier Field was considered an early candidate, however the NFL's Chicago Bears objected, citing a possible home game for the 2008 NFL playoffs that weekend (January 3–4); ironically, the Bears ended up being eliminated from contention in the last week. It was decided that the game would be played at Wrigley Field, the North Side home of the Chicago Cubs, as confirmed by the Minneapolis Star-Tribune on July 6. Ten days afterward, the NHL confirmed the reports that the game would officially be held on New Year's Day. Faceoff was scheduled for 1 pm EST (12 noon CST). The Red Wings won the game 6–4.

=== All-star Game ===
The All-Star Game was held on January 25, 2009, at the Bell Centre in Montreal, home of the Montreal Canadiens, in conjunction with the Canadiens' centennial celebrations.

=== Highlights ===
The first goal of the season was scored by Markus Naslund of the New York Rangers in Prague against the Tampa Bay Lightning. On October 16, 2008, the Blackhawks fired head coach Denis Savard and replaced him with former Colorado Avalanche and St. Louis Blues head coach Joel Quenneville. On Saturday, October 25, the NHL scheduled fifteen games—with all 30 teams playing—for the second time in league history.

On November 3, 2008, in a game between the Columbus Blue Jackets and the New York Islanders, Islanders defenceman Chris Campoli scored twice in one overtime. First, Campoli retrieved a loose puck and fired a shot past Jacket's goaltender Fredrik Norrena. The shot went through the net and, while Campoli celebrated, the game continued. Campoli then received a pass in front of the goal and shot the puck again into the net.

Tampa Bay Lightning head coach Barry Melrose would record his first win as a head coach in over 13 years on October 21, 2008, with a 3–2 victory over the Atlanta Thrashers. However, the Lightning did not get off to a great start as hoped, and Melrose was fired by the Lightning with a 5–7–4 record. Rick Tocchet, who had been hired as assistant coach during the previous offseason, was promoted to interim head coach. Melrose subsequently re-signed with broadcaster ESPN. Melrose proceeded to get into a war of words with the Lightning management, accusing the management of interference during an interview on a Toronto radio station.

On December 2, 2008, Carolina Hurricanes' head coach Peter Laviolette was fired and Paul Maurice was rehired in his place. Ron Francis became the team's associate head coach.

During the annual December board of governors' meeting, the issue of the state of the economy was raised. The Phoenix Coyotes were reported to lose up to $35 million on the 2008–09 season. Asked to comment on Phoenix's loss, Commissioner Gary Bettman was quoted as saying "They're going to get through the season just fine." The Buffalo Sabres, while not for sale, had been approached for purchase.

On December 5, Sean Avery of the Dallas Stars was suspended six games for 'off-colour' remarks prior to a game against the Calgary Flames. On December 14, the Stars' management announced that he would not be returning to the team. After Avery's reinstatement by the league, he reported to the Hartford Wolf Pack of the AHL. He was placed on re-entry waivers and was claimed by the New York Rangers, his team in 2007–08.

The Christmas holiday roster freeze went into effect on December 19, 2008, and ended on December 27, 2008.

On December 23, the Toronto Globe and Mail reported that the Phoenix Coyotes were receiving financial assistance from the league in the form of advances on league revenues. The Coyotes pledged all of their assets to New York company SOF Investments LP to cover an estimated debt of $80 million. The team lost an estimated $200 million since 2001 and lost about $30 million this season. One of the team's owners, Jerry Moyes' principal source of revenue, Swift Transportation was also in financial difficulty. ESPN reported that the league had gotten involved with the operations of the Coyotes and their revenues. The NHL reportedly wanted to work with the city of Glendale, Arizona, which owns the arena and receives revenues from the team. ESPN also reported that Moyes wanted to sell his share of the team and that Hollywood film producer Jerry Bruckheimer was a possible interested purchaser.

In February 2009, three head coaches were relieved from their duties. On February 1, Craig Hartsburg was fired as head coach of the Ottawa Senators following a 17–24–7 start to the season and was immediately replaced by Binghamton Senators head coach Cory Clouston. On February 15, Dan Bylsma of the American Hockey League's Wilkes-Barre/Scranton Penguins was promoted to replace Michel Therrien of the Pittsburgh Penguins as interim head coach. Bylsma would later be announced as a permanent head coach of the team. On February 23, the New York Rangers fired Tom Renney following an overtime loss and he was replaced on the same day by TSN analyst and former Tampa Bay Lightning head coach, John Tortorella.

In March, goaltender Martin Brodeur returned to the New Jersey Devils after a long injury. He became the goaltender with most wins in league history, surpassing the record of Patrick Roy. Guy Carbonneau was also fired as the head coach of the Canadiens when the team was in danger of being eliminated from the playoffs.

In April, the Columbus Blue Jackets qualified for the playoffs for the first time in franchise history. The Carolina Hurricanes qualified for the playoffs for the first time since their 2006 Stanley Cup victory. The Ottawa Senators missed the playoffs for the first time since the 1995–96 season.

In an ironic twist, considering his injury woes of past seasons, Jordan Leopold played in all 64 games for the Colorado Avalanche. Upon being traded to the Calgary Flames Leopold played in all 19 remaining games for the Flames becoming the only NHL player to play 83 games of the 82 game 2008–09 season. Jacques Lemaire resigned as the first head coach of the Minnesota Wild on April 11 after missing the playoffs.

Scoring in the regular season improved somewhat from 2007–08, with an average of 5.7 goals scored per game (7,006 goals scored over 1,230 games). Goaltenders combined for 156 shutouts.

In May 2009, it was revealed that the NHL had taken control of the Phoenix Coyotes from the start of the season and had known of the financial difficulties of the team prior to the start of the 2008–09 season. After owner Jerry Moyes petitioned the club into bankruptcy against the league's wishes, so as to sell the team to Jim Balsillie who plans to move the team to Hamilton, Ontario, the league challenged the right of Moyes to file for bankruptcy. In the documents filed with the Phoenix bankruptcy court, the NHL stated that the league took official control of the team on November 14, 2008. The league then began advancing money to the club from league revenues, and made a loan to the club in February 2009, for a combined estimated total of $44.5 million over the full season. During the season, commissioner Bettman and deputy commissioner Bill Daly had made a series of denials and obfuscations, while firing the Coyotes CEO and laying off 18 Coyotes employees. Moyes' documents filed with the court indicated that the team had lost $73 million over the last three years, and that the projected loss was $45 million for 2008–09.

Jacques Martin became the head coach of the Montreal Canadiens on June 1 when former coach Bob Gainey returned to his general manager status. On June 3, Tony Granato was fired as the head coach of the Colorado Avalanche and was replaced on the next day by Joe Sacco, head coach of the Avs' top minor league affiliate the Lake Erie Monsters of the AHL. On June 9, despite Brent Sutter winning 51 games (a franchise record), he resigned as head coach of the New Jersey Devils after two first-round playoff losses because of family reasons. One day later on June 10, Dave Tippett was fired as head coach of the Dallas Stars after missing the playoffs for the first time since the 2001–02 season, when Rick Wilson took over as coach. Marc Crawford was named the new head coach for the 2009–10 season the next day. Todd Richards would be named the second head coach of the Minnesota Wild on June 15.

== Standings ==
GP = Games played, W = Wins, L = Losses, OTL = Overtime/shootout losses, GF = Goals for, GA = Goals against, Pts = Points.

Eastern Conference
R		Div	GP	W	L	OTL	GF	GA	Pts
**1**	**z – Boston Bruins**	**NE**	**82**	**53**	**19**	**10**	**274**	**196**	116
**2**	**y – Washington Capitals**	**SE**	**82**	**50**	**24**	**8**	**272**	**245**	108
**3**	**y – New Jersey Devils**	**AT**	**82**	**51**	**27**	**4**	**244**	**209**	106
**4**	**Pittsburgh Penguins**	**AT**	**82**	**45**	**28**	**9**	**264**	**239**	99
**5**	**Philadelphia Flyers**	**AT**	**82**	**44**	**27**	**11**	**264**	**238**	99
**6**	**Carolina Hurricanes**	**SE**	**82**	**45**	**30**	**7**	**239**	**226**	97
**7**	**New York Rangers**	**AT**	**82**	**43**	**30**	**9**	**210**	**218**	95
**8**	**Montreal Canadiens**	**NE**	**82**	**41**	**30**	**11**	**249**	**247**	93
8.5
9	Florida Panthers	SE	82	41	30	11	234	231	93
10	Buffalo Sabres	NE	82	41	32	9	250	234	91
11	Ottawa Senators	NE	82	36	35	11	217	237	83
12	Toronto Maple Leafs	NE	82	34	35	13	250	293	81
13	Atlanta Thrashers	SE	82	35	41	6	257	280	76
14	Tampa Bay Lightning	SE	82	24	40	18	210	279	66
15	New York Islanders	AT	82	26	47	9	201	279	61

bold – qualified for playoffs, y – division winner, z – placed first in conference (and division)

AT – Atlantic Division, NE – Northeast Division, SE – Southeast Division Tiebreakers

- Pittsburgh Received the 4 seed over Philadelphia by a wins tie breaker (45 to 44 in favor of PIT)
- Montreal Received the 8 seed over Florida, because they won the season series between the two (3-1)

Western Conference
R		Div	GP	W	L	OTL	GF	GA	Pts
**1**	**p – San Jose Sharks**	**PA**	**82**	**53**	**18**	**11**	**257**	**204**	117
**2**	**y – Detroit Red Wings**	**CE**	**82**	**51**	**21**	**10**	**295**	**244**	112
**3**	**y – Vancouver Canucks**	**NW**	**82**	**45**	**27**	**10**	**246**	**220**	100
**4**	**Chicago Blackhawks**	**CE**	**82**	**46**	**24**	**12**	**264**	**216**	104
**5**	**Calgary Flames**	**NW**	**82**	**46**	**30**	**6**	**254**	**248**	98
**6**	**St. Louis Blues**	**CE**	**82**	**41**	**31**	**10**	**233**	**233**	92
**7**	**Columbus Blue Jackets**	**CE**	**82**	**41**	**31**	**10**	**226**	**230**	92
**8**	**Anaheim Ducks**	**PA**	**82**	**42**	**33**	**7**	**245**	**238**	91
8.5
9	Minnesota Wild	NW	82	40	33	9	219	200	89
10	Nashville Predators	CE	82	40	34	8	213	233	88
11	Edmonton Oilers	NW	82	38	35	9	234	248	85
12	Dallas Stars	PA	82	36	35	11	230	257	83
13	Phoenix Coyotes	PA	82	36	39	7	208	252	79
14	Los Angeles Kings	PA	82	34	37	11	207	234	79
15	Colorado Avalanche	NW	82	32	45	5	199	257	69

bold – qualified for playoffs, y – division winner, p – Presidents' Trophy winner
CE – Central Division, NW – Northwest Division, PA – Pacific Division

=== Tiebreaking procedures ===
In the event of a tie in points in the standings at the end of the season, ties are broken using the following tiebreaking procedures. The higher ranked team is the one with:

1. The greater number of games won.
2. The greater number of points earned in games between the tied clubs.
3. The greater differential between goals for and against for the entire regular season.

== Playoffs ==
=== Bracket ===
In each round, teams competed in a best-of-seven series following a 2–2–1–1–1 format (scores in the bracket indicate the number of games won in each best-of-seven series). The team with home ice advantage played at home for games one and two (and games five and seven, if necessary), and the other team played at home for games three and four (and game six, if necessary). The top eight teams in each conference made the playoffs, with the three division winners seeded 1–3 based on regular season record, and the five remaining teams seeded 4–8.

The NHL used "re-seeding" instead of a fixed bracket playoff system. During the first three rounds, the highest remaining seed in each conference was matched against the lowest remaining seed, the second-highest remaining seed played the second-lowest remaining seed, and so forth. The higher-seeded team was awarded home ice advantage. The two conference winners then advanced to the Stanley Cup Finals, where home ice advantage was awarded to the team that had the better regular season record.

Conference quarterfinals	Conference semifinals
1	Boston	4
8	Montreal	0
1	Boston	3
6	Carolina	4
3	New Jersey	3
6	Carolina	4
Eastern Conference
2	Washington	4
7	NY Rangers	3
2	Washington	3
4	Pittsburgh	4
4	Pittsburgh	4
5	Philadelphia	2
1	San Jose	2
8	Anaheim	4
2	Detroit	4
8	Anaheim	3
2	Detroit	4
7	Columbus	0
Western Conference
3	Vancouver	4
6	St. Louis	0
3	Vancouver	2
4	Chicago	4
4	Chicago	4
5	Calgary	2

Conference finals
6	Carolina	0
4	Pittsburgh	4
2	Detroit	4
4	Chicago	1

Stanley Cup Finals
E4	Pittsburgh	4
W2	Detroit	3

== Awards ==
2008–09 NHL awards
Award	Recipient(s)	Runner(s)-up/Finalists
Presidents' Trophy	San Jose Sharks	Boston Bruins
Prince of Wales Trophy	Pittsburgh Penguins (Eastern Conference playoff champion)	Carolina Hurricanes
Clarence S. Campbell Bowl	Detroit Red Wings (Western Conference playoff champion)	Chicago Blackhawks
Art Ross Trophy	Evgeni Malkin, Pittsburgh Penguins	Alexander Ovechkin (Washington Capitals)
Bill Masterton Memorial Trophy	Steve Sullivan, Nashville Predators	Chris Chelios (Detroit Red Wings); Richard Zednik (Florida Panthers)
Calder Memorial Trophy	Steve Mason, Columbus Blue Jackets	Kris Versteeg (Chicago Blackhawks); Bobby Ryan (Anaheim Ducks)
Conn Smythe Trophy	Evgeni Malkin, Pittsburgh Penguins	N/A
Frank J. Selke Trophy	Pavel Datsyuk, Detroit Red Wings	Ryan Kesler (Vancouver Canucks); Mike Richards (Philadelphia Flyers)
Hart Memorial Trophy	Alexander Ovechkin, Washington Capitals	Evgeni Malkin (Pittsburgh Penguins); Pavel Datsyuk (Detroit Red Wings)
Jack Adams Award	Claude Julien, Boston Bruins	Todd McLellan (San Jose Sharks); Andy Murray (St. Louis Blues)
James Norris Memorial Trophy	Zdeno Chara, Boston Bruins	Mike Green (Washington Capitals); Nicklas Lidstrom (Detroit Red Wings)
King Clancy Memorial Trophy	Ethan Moreau, Edmonton Oilers	N/A
Lady Byng Memorial Trophy	Pavel Datsyuk, Detroit Red Wings	Martin St. Louis (Tampa Bay Lightning); Zach Parise (New Jersey Devils)
Lester B. Pearson Award	Alexander Ovechkin, Washington Capitals	Evgeni Malkin (Pittsburgh Penguins); Pavel Datsyuk (Detroit Red Wings)
Maurice 'Rocket' Richard Trophy	Alexander Ovechkin, Washington Capitals	Jeff Carter (Philadelphia Flyers)
NHL Foundation Player Award	Rick Nash, Columbus Blue Jackets	N/A
Vezina Trophy	Tim Thomas, Boston Bruins	Steve Mason (Columbus Blue Jackets); Nicklas Backstrom (Minnesota Wild)
William M. Jennings Trophy	Tim Thomas and Manny Fernandez, Boston Bruins	N/A
NHL Lifetime Achievement Award	Jean Beliveau	N/A

=== All-Star teams ===
First All-Star team

- Forwards: Alexander Ovechkin • Evgeni Malkin • Jarome Iginla
- Defencemen: Mike Green • Zdeno Chara
- Goaltender: Tim Thomas

Second All-Star team

- Forwards: Zach Parise • Pavel Datsyuk • Marian Hossa
- Defencemen: Nicklas Lidstrom • Dan Boyle
- Goaltender: Steve Mason

=== NHL All-Rookie team ===
- Forwards: Patrik Berglund • Kris Versteeg • Bobby Ryan
- Defencemen: Drew Doughty • Luke Schenn
- Goaltender: Steve Mason

== Player statistics ==
=== Scoring leaders ===
GP = Games played; G = Goals; A = Assists; Pts = Points; +/– = Plus/minus; PIM = Penalty minutes

Player	Team	GP	G	A	Pts	+/–	PIM
Evgeni Malkin	Pittsburgh Penguins	82	35	78	113	+17	80
Alexander Ovechkin	Washington Capitals	79	56	54	110	+8	72
Sidney Crosby	Pittsburgh Penguins	77	33	70	103	+3	76
Pavel Datsyuk	Detroit Red Wings	81	32	65	97	+34	22
Zach Parise	New Jersey Devils	82	45	49	94	+30	24
Ilya Kovalchuk	Atlanta Thrashers	79	43	48	91	−12	50
Ryan Getzlaf	Anaheim Ducks	81	25	66	91	+5	121
Jarome Iginla	Calgary Flames	81	35	54	89	−2	37
Marc Savard	Boston Bruins	82	25	63	88	+25	70
Nicklas Backstrom	Washington Capitals	82	22	66	88	+16	46

Source: NHL

=== Leading goaltenders ===
GP = Games played; Min = Minutes played; W = Wins; L = Losses; OT = Overtime/shootout losses; GA = Goals against; SO = Shutouts; Sv% = Save percentage; GAA = Goals against average

Player	Team	GP	Min	W	L	OT	GA	SO	Sv%	GAA
Tim Thomas	Boston Bruins	54	3,258:49	36	11	7	114	5	.933	2.10
Steve Mason	Columbus Blue Jackets	60	3,604:58	33	19	7	135	10	.917	2.25
Niklas Backstrom	Minnesota Wild	71	4,088:03	37	24	8	159	8	.923	2.33
Jonas Hiller	Anaheim Ducks	45	2,446:26	23	15	1	95	4	.920	2.33
Roberto Luongo	Vancouver Canucks	54	3,181:05	33	13	7	124	9	.920	2.34
Pekka Rinne	Nashville Predators	52	2,999:12	29	15	4	119	7	.917	2.38
Nikolai Khabibulin	Chicago Blackhawks	41	2,407:15	24	8	7	96	2	.917	2.39
Scott Clemmensen	New Jersey Devils	40	2,355:56	25	13	1	94	2	.917	2.39
Martin Brodeur	New Jersey Devils	31	1,813:35	19	9	3	73	5	.916	2.41
Chris Mason	St. Louis Blues	57	3,214:54	27	21	7	129	6	.916	2.41

== Records ==
- February 14, 2009 – Mike Green, defenceman with the Washington Capitals, scored in eight consecutive games to set a new NHL record for a defenceman.
- February 15, 2009 – Mike Richards, center with the Philadelphia Flyers, became the first player in NHL history to score three career 3-on-5 shorthanded goals when he beat New York Rangers goaltender Henrik Lundqvist in a 5–2 win.
- March 12, 2009 – Henrik Lundqvist, goaltender with the New York Rangers, became the first goaltender in NHL history to win 30 games in each of his first four seasons.
- March 17, 2009 – Martin Brodeur, goaltender with the New Jersey Devils, won his 552nd game, surpassing Patrick Roy for the all-time wins record.
- April 8, 2009 – Curtis Joseph, goaltender with the Toronto Maple Leafs, lost his 352nd game, tying Gump Worsley for most losses by a goaltender.
- June 12, 2009 – Sidney Crosby became the youngest captain in NHL history to win the Stanley Cup.
- June 12, 2009 – Evgeni Malkin became the first Russian player in NHL history to win the Conn Smythe Trophy.

== Coaches ==
=== Eastern Conference ===
- Atlanta Thrashers: John Anderson
- Boston Bruins: Claude Julien
- Buffalo Sabres: Lindy Ruff
- Carolina Hurricanes: Peter Laviolette and Paul Maurice
- Florida Panthers: Peter DeBoer
- Montreal Canadiens: Guy Carbonneau and Bob Gainey
- New Jersey Devils: Brent Sutter
- New York Islanders: Scott Gordon
- New York Rangers: Tom Renney and John Tortorella
- Ottawa Senators: Craig Hartsburg and Cory Clouston
- Philadelphia Flyers: John Stevens
- Pittsburgh Penguins: Michel Therrien and Dan Bylsma
- Tampa Bay Lightning: Barry Melrose and Rick Tocchet
- Toronto Maple Leafs: Ron Wilson
- Washington Capitals: Bruce Boudreau

=== Western Conference ===
- Anaheim Ducks: Randy Carlyle
- Calgary Flames: Mike Keenan
- Chicago Blackhawks: Denis Savard and Joel Quenneville
- Colorado Avalanche: Joe Sacco
- Columbus Blue Jackets: Ken Hitchcock
- Dallas Stars: Dave Tippett
- Detroit Red Wings: Mike Babcock
- Edmonton Oilers: Craig MacTavish
- Los Angeles Kings: Terry Murray
- Minnesota Wild: Jacques Lemaire
- Nashville Predators: Barry Trotz
- Phoenix Coyotes: Wayne Gretzky
- San Jose Sharks: Todd McLellan
- St. Louis Blues: Andy Murray
- Vancouver Canucks: Alain Vigneault

== Milestones ==
=== First games ===
The following is a list of players of note that played their first NHL game in 2008–09, listed with their first team:

Player	Team	Notability
Mikael Backlund	Calgary Flames	King Clancy Memorial Trophy winner
Ben Bishop	St. Louis Blues	Two-time NHL All-Star team
Drew Doughty	Los Angeles Kings	James Norris Memorial Trophy winner, four-time NHL All-Star team, over 1,000 games played
Steve Mason	Columbus Blue Jackets	Calder Memorial Trophy winner, one-time NHL All-Star team
James Neal	Dallas Stars	One-time NHL All-Star team
Max Pacioretty	Montreal Canadiens	Bill Masterton Memorial Trophy winner
Alex Pietrangelo	St. Louis Blues	Three-time NHL All-Star team
Cory Schneider	Vancouver Canucks	William M. Jennings Trophy winner
Wayne Simmonds	Los Angeles Kings	Mark Messier Leadership Award winner, Over 1,000 games played
Steven Stamkos	Tampa Bay Lightning	First overall pick in the 2008 Draft, Mark Messier Leadership Award winner, Two-time Maurice "Rocket" Richard Trophy winner, Two-time NHL All-Star team, over 1,000 games played
Semyon Varlamov	Washington Capitals	One-time NHL All-Star team
Jakub Voracek	Columbus Blue Jackets	One-time NHL All-Star team, Over 1,000 games played
Blake Wheeler	Boston Bruins	One-time NHL All-Star team, Over 1,000 games played

=== Last games ===
The following is a list of players of note who played their last NHL game in 2008–09, listed with their team:

Player	Team	Notability
Radek Bonk	Nashville Predators	2-time NHL All-Star.
Patrice Brisebois	Montreal Canadiens	Jean Béliveau Trophy winner; over 1000 games played.
Sergei Fedorov	Washington Capitals	Hart Memorial Trophy winner; Lester B. Pearson Award winner; 2-time Frank J. Selke Trophy winner; Kharlamov Trophy winner; 6-time NHL All Star; over 1200 games played.
Bret Hedican	Anaheim Ducks	Over 1,000 games played.
Bobby Holik	New Jersey Devils	2-time NHL All Star; over 1300 games played.
Curtis Joseph	Toronto Maple Leafs	King Clancy Memorial Trophy winner; 3-time NHL All-Star.
Olaf Kolzig	Tampa Bay Lightning	King Clancy Memorial Trophy winner; Vezina Trophy winner; 2-time NHL All-Star.
Claude Lemieux	San Jose Sharks	Conn Smythe Trophy winner; over 1200 games played.
Darren McCarty	Detroit Red Wings	NHL Foundation Player Award winner.
Markus Naslund	New York Rangers	Lester B. Pearson Award winner; 5-time NHL All-Star; over 1100 games played.
Teppo Numminen	Buffalo Sabres	3-time NHL All-Star; over 1300 games played.
Michael Peca	Columbus Blue Jackets	Olympic gold medalist; 2-time Frank J. Selke Trophy winner.
Luke Richardson	Ottawa Senators	Over 1400 games played.
Gary Roberts	Tampa Bay Lightning	Bill Masterton Memorial Trophy winner; 2-time NHL All-Star; over 1200 games played.
Jeremy Roenick	San Jose Sharks	9-time NHL All-Star; over 1300 games played.
Joe Sakic	Colorado Avalanche	Conn Smythe Trophy winner; Hart Memorial Trophy winner; Lady Byng Memorial Trophy winner; Lester B. Pearson Award winner; NHL Foundation Player Award; 13-time NHL All-Star; over 1300 games played.
Brendan Shanahan	New Jersey Devils	King Clancy Memorial Trophy winner; 8-time NHL All-Star; over 1500 games played.
Mike Sillinger	New York Islanders	over 1000 games played.
Jason Smith	Ottawa Senators	over 1000 games played.
Mats Sundin	Vancouver Canucks	Olympic gold medalist; Mark Messier Leadership Award winner; Viking Award winner; 9-time NHL All-Star; over 1300 games played.
Sergei Zubov	Dallas Stars	4-time NHL All-Star; over 1000 games played.

== Broadcasting rights ==
In June 2008, the NHL reached a new Canadian television deal with TSN, allowing the network to broadcast 70 regular season games per season featuring at least one Canadian team. CBC continued to air Saturday night Hockey Night in Canada regular season games. The league also removed the restriction that only allowed all playoff games involving Canadian teams to air only on CBC, even if it meant such games had to be broadcast regionally. CBC and TSN continued to split the first three rounds of the playoffs, and CBC still maintained exclusive coverage of the Stanley Cup Finals. But under the new deal, CBC and TSN selected the rights to individual series using a draft-like setup, regardless if they involve Canadian teams.

This was the fourth season of the league's U.S. national broadcast rights deals with NBC and Versus. During the regular season, Versus aired games generally on Monday and Tuesday nights, while NBC had games on selected weekends. During the playoffs, NBC had the rights to air selected weekend games during the first three postseason rounds of the Stanley Cup playoffs, and games 3–7 of the Stanley Cup Finals, while Versus televised selected first and second round playoff games, all Conference Finals games not aired on NBC, and the first two games of the Stanley Cup Finals.

== See also ==
- Season structure of the NHL
- 2009 Stanley Cup playoffs
- 2008 NHL entry draft
- 2007–08 NHL season
- 2008–09 NHL transactions
- 2009 NHL Winter Classic
- 57th National Hockey League All-Star Game
- National Hockey League All-Star Game
- 2008 in sports
- 2009 in sports
- Victoria Cup
