= NHL on television in the 2000s =

Since 2000, the CBC has aired an annual special Hockey Day in Canada broadcast to celebrate the game in Canada. The broadcast includes hockey-related features all afternoon, leading up to a tripleheader of NHL action featuring the seven Canadian teams (Calgary Flames, Edmonton Oilers, Montreal Canadiens, Ottawa Senators, Toronto Maple Leafs, Vancouver Canucks, Winnipeg Jets). One exception was the 2008 edition that featured four games including two American teams (Detroit and Colorado) along with the six Canadian teams; this was due to the NHL's schedule format at the time, as there was no inter-conference games between Canadian teams. Lead commentators, Don Cherry and Ron MacLean broadcast from a remote area. The broadcast includes live broadcast segments from smaller communities right across the country and features panel discussions on issues facing "Canada's game" at both the minor and pro levels. The day is usually in mid-February, but was broadcast in early January in 2002 and 2006 due to the 2002 Winter Olympics and 2006 Winter Olympics, respectively; the 2007 event was also held in January (January 13), though no sporting events key to Canada were scheduled.

For years, all playoff games involving Canadian teams were aired by the CBC, though not always on a national basis. From 2009 through 2014, rights to individual series were instead picked using a draft-like setup; in the first round, CBC first, second, fourth, and sixth selections among opening round series, and TSN had the third, fifth, seventh, and eighth selections. CBC tended to select series involving at least one Canadian team and series involving teams with strong Canadian fanbases (such as Boston, Buffalo, Detroit, and Pittsburgh); as a result of this arrangement, if more than two Canadian teams qualified for the playoffs, it was likely that at least one series involving a Canadian team would be broadcast by TSN.

In the U.S., the NHL's deal with ABC and ESPN expired at the end of the 2003–04 season. Prior to the start of the 2004–05 season, the league made agreements with NBC and ESPN, with the former replacing ABC as the NHL's network television partner. But after the 2004–05 NHL lockout cancelled the season, ESPN opted out of its deal, leaving the league without a cable partner. Comcast then agreed to air games on its OLN network starting in 2005, which was renamed Versus one season later.

== Year-by-year breakdown ==
=== 2000 ===
In August 1998, ABC, ESPN and ESPN2 signed a five-year television deal with the NHL, worth a total of approximately US$600 million (or $120 million per year). The $120 million per year that ABC and ESPN paid for rights dwarfed the $5.5 million that the NHL received from American national broadcasts in the 1991–92 season. As previously mentioned, as was the case with the 1992–1994 deal, ABC's subsequent NHL coverage was in reality, made up of time–buys from ESPN. This was noted in copyright beds at the conclusion of the telecasts, i.e. "The preceding program has been paid for by ESPN, Inc." ESPN then signed a similar television rights contract in 2002 so it could produce and broadcast National Basketball Association games on ABC.

Beginning in 1999–2000 season, ESPN was permitted two exclusive telecasts per team per season. When ESPN started broadcasting NBA games on Wednesday and Friday nights in 2002, the weekly hockey broadcasts were moved to Thursday and the broadcasts renamed to Thursday Night Hockey.

ABC also televised the National Hockey League All-Star Game and games 3–7 of the Stanley Cup Finals in prime time. In the league's previous broadcast television deal with Fox, the network split coverage of the Stanley Cup Finals with ESPN. Games one, five and seven were usually scheduled to be televised by Fox; games two, three, four and sox by ESPN. However, from 1995 to 1998, the Finals were all four-game sweeps; 1999 ended in six games. The consequence was that – except for 1995, when Fox did televise game four – the decisive game was never on network television.

=== 2002 ===
From its debut in 1992 until the 2001–02 NHL season, weekly regular-season games were broadcast on Sundays (between NFL and baseball seasons), Wednesdays, and Fridays, and were titled Sunday/Wednesday/Friday Night Hockey. Prior to 1999, these telecasts were non-exclusive, meaning they were blacked out in the regions of the competing teams, and an alternate game was shown in these affected areas.

From 1998–99 until 2001–02, Sportsnet aired Labatt Blue Tuesday Night Hockey weekly during the regular season, and covered first-round playoff series that did not feature Canadian teams. The network's first live event was an opening night match between the Philadelphia Flyers and New York Rangers. Jim Hughson and Craig Simpson served as the lead broadcast team. Kevin Quinn and Ryan Walter served as the secondary team. Darren Dreger as the studio host and Greg Millen (1998–1999), joined by other personalities such as Nick Kypreos (1998–2002), and Mike Keenan (1999–2000).

HDnet's coverage began in the 2001–02 season with a 65-game schedule. HDNet produced broadcasts in conjunction with several Fox Sports Net regional outlets, sharing audio and graphics with FSN's standard definition production units. NHL on HDNet prototypically, aired on Tuesday and Friday nights during its early years.

=== 2003 ===
TSN's most recent period as national rightsholder lasted from 2002 to 2014. During this period, TSN usually televised three or four games per week during the regular season, with its flagship broadcast, Wednesday Night Hockey, airing on Wednesdays.

TSN began airing Toronto Maple Leafs games regionally, presented by Molson as Molson Canadian Leafs Hockey, in the 1998–99 season, when they first lost the national contract. The package was originally for 30 games, but reduced to 17 once TSN re-acquired the national rights in 2002. Ten of those games were ones that TSN acquired from the NHL to air nationally. The other seven, TSN acquired from the Maple Leafs as regional games. However, TSN eventually came to an agreement with the other five Canadian clubs to air these games nationally. Play by play of the regional Leafs games was originally handled by Joe Bowen and Harry Neale, with Glenn Healy serving as ice-level reporter. When TSN re-acquired the national cable rights to the NHL in 2002, Pierre McGuire was hired as its lead hockey analyst. After the 2011 NHL Draft, it was announced McGuire had taken a full-time position as a reporter for NBC Sports, effective as of the 2011–12 season. Pierre still makes occasional appearances as an analyst during TSN's hockey coverage and on TSN Radio.

In 2003, the Montreal Canadiens announced a deal to license its French-language broadcast rights for all of its preseason, season, and playoff games to RDS. This was controversial as it threatened the longest-running television show in Quebec, Radio-Canada's La Soirée du hockey. Days later, an agreement was reached whereby RDS and Radio-Canada would simultaneously broadcast Canadiens games on Saturday nights, saving the show. Within the province of Quebec, this arrangement stopped after the 2003–04 NHL season, and French-language Canadiens broadcasts now air only on RDS. Simulcasted coverage continued in regions that do not receive RDS on analog TV (all of Canada south/west of the Ottawa Region) on Radio-Canada until the 2006–07 NHL season. In addition to Canadiens games, RDS also televised a smaller package of Ottawa Senators games, which appear on either RDS or RDS Info as well as other games. RDS also had the French-language rights to the Stanley Cup playoffs and Finals through 2014, regardless of which teams participated.

The NHL game broadcasts formerly varied in name depending on the day of the week. Saturday games were known as Le Hockey du Samedi Soir Coors Light (Coors Light Saturday Night Hockey). Tuesday games were known as Les Méchants Mardis Molson-Ex while all of the other day or night games were known as Le Hockey Subway des Canadiens (Subway Canadiens Hockey). NHL telecasts not involving the Canadiens were simply titled Le hockey Bud Light de la LNH (Bud Light NHL Hockey). Since 2014, games have been known as Le hockey des Canadiens (Bell/Coca-Cola/McDonald's). (Bell/Coca-Cola/McDonald's Canadiens Hockey). The sponsor affiliations change from time to time.

2003 was the only year that ABC broadcast both the NBA and the Stanley Cup Final that involved teams from one city in the same year, as both the New Jersey Nets and the New Jersey Devils were in their respective league's finals. During ABC's broadcast of game three between the San Antonio Spurs and the Nets in New Jersey on June 8, Brad Nessler, Tom Tolbert and Bill Walton said that ABC was in a unique situation getting ready for both that game and game seven of the Stanley Cup Final between the Devils and the Mighty Ducks of Anaheim the following night, also at Continental Airlines Arena. Gary Thorne, Bill Clement and John Davidson mentioned this the following night, and thanked Nessler, Tolbert and Walton for promoting ABC's broadcast of game seven of the Stanley Cup Final.

=== 2004 ===
In May 2004, NBC reached an agreement with the NHL to broadcast a slate of regular season games and the Stanley Cup Finals. The plan called for NBC to air at least six weeks of regular season games (three regional games each week) on Saturday afternoons. In addition, NBC was to show one or two playoff games per weekend during the playoffs. Between two and five games from the Stanley Cup Final would air in prime time (OLN/Versus received the other two as part of its package). NBC's primary game each week, as well as the Stanley Cup Finals, would air in high definition.

Unlike previous network television deals with the NHL (like Fox, which had the rights from 1994 to 1999 and ABC, which had the rights from 1999 to 2004), NBC paid no upfront rights fee, instead splitting advertising revenue with the league after meeting its own production and distribution costs. On the other hand, the league avoided the arrangement some minor sports leagues have, in which they pay networks for broadcast time and produce their own telecasts, but keep any advertising revenue.

The last time NBC Sports entered a television deal which did not require it to pay any rights fees was in 1994–1995, when the division was involved in the Major League Baseball joint venture called "The Baseball Network." To a lesser extent, NBC also had a similar sort of revenue-sharing agreement with the Arena Football League and, because of their ownership in the XFL, also paid no rights fees for airing that league.

Following the 2003–04 season, ESPN was only willing to renew its contract for two additional years at $60 million per year. ABC refused to televise the Stanley Cup Final in prime time, suggesting that the Finals games it would telecast be played on weekend afternoons (including a potential Game 7). Disney executives later conceded that they overpaid for the 1999–2004 deal, so the company's offer to renew the television rights was lower in 2004.

=== 2005 ===
Before the 2004–05 lockout, the NHL had reached two separate deals with NBC (who would replace ABC as the NHL's American national broadcast television partner) and ESPN. ESPN offered the NHL $60 million for about 40 games (only fifteen of which would be during the regular season), all on ESPN2, with presumably, only some midweek playoff games, the first two games of the Stanley Cup Final and the All-Star Game airing on ESPN.

NBC's deal involved a revenue sharing agreement with the NHL as opposed to a traditional rights fee, and included rights to six regular season windows, seven postseason broadcasts and games 3–7 of the Stanley Cup Final. ESPN had a two-year deal that they opted out of after the lockout, leaving the NHL without a cable partner. In August 2005, Comcast (who owns the Philadelphia Flyers) paid $70 million a year for three years to put games (54 or more games each season under the agreement, generally on Monday and Tuesday nights) on OLN, later known as Versus. Due to the abbreviated off-season, the 2005–06 schedule did not offer OLN exclusivity, which they received in 2006–07. Versus would also cover the playoffs and exclusively air games one and two of the Stanley Cup Final.

During the 2004–05 NHL lockout, CBC replaced Hockey Night in Canada with a block of Saturday night movies branded as Movie Night in Canada, hosted by Ron MacLean from various junior hockey venues. A labour deal was reached in time to contest the 2005–06 NHL season.

CBC's own on-air talent was also locked out during the summer of 2005, nearly missing the start of the hockey season. Some journalists have suggested that this helped cause TSN and the CFL to end their sublicence deal with CBC after the 2007 season, as games from that league aired without commentary during the lockout.

While there was no coverage during the 2004–05 season due to the lockout, HDNet instead, produced a series called NHL Relived, a special series featuring the best games from the 2003–04 season, including the NHL All-Star Game and Stanley Cup Playoff games.

=== 2006 ===
When HDNet's coverage resumed following the lockout, they reduced their schedule from 65 games to 52 games (bumped up to 53 the following year) on Thursday and Saturday nights. By this time, it was apparent that HDNet would add games to this broadcast schedule bi-monthly so that they will be able to feature what they would consider hottest players, teams and match ups at the moment (a flexible schedule in other words).

NHL games officially returned to NBC under the new agreement on January 14, 2006, debuting with three regional games (New York Rangers at Detroit Red Wings, Colorado Avalanche at Philadelphia Flyers, which is aired on CSN Philadelphia also followed by the Dallas Stars at Boston Bruins) to substantial praise among hockey fans and writers, who often compare the television network's presentation to Hockey Night in Canada, which is broadcast in full on the NHL Center Ice package (although some writers even speculated that NBC's playoff broadcasts were superior to CBC's, largely because of their choice of announcers and the fact that NBC provided HD coverage of games prior to the Finals).

Critics of what the show chooses to program allege that Hockey Night particularly favours the Toronto Maple Leafs. On March 11, 2006, CBC did not air the pre-game sweater retirement ceremony for Canadiens legend and credited slapshot inventor Bernard "Boom Boom" Geoffrion, electing to continue on with its planned broadcast of a Toronto Maple Leafs/Tampa Bay Lightning game. The decision was worsened by the fact that Geoffrion had died earlier in the day. CBC did devote portions of its coverage to Geoffrion, including a pre-game tribute, and acknowledgements during the first intermission and Coach's Corner, while the ceremony was broadcast in full by French-language outlets. A CBC spokesperson explained that the network had only received a "handful" of complaints surrounding the lack of coverage; if CBC had aired the ceremony in full, it would have pre-empted coverage of the Leafs game for 40 minutes. A writer for the Ottawa Citizen considered the decision to be an example of this perceived bias towards the Maple Leafs by CBC, believing that they did not want to "offend" their fans by not showing their game in full.

Versus averaged a 0.2 Nielsen Media Research household rating, about level with the 2005–06 regular season NHL numbers and its 2006 prime time average.

Beginning with the 2006 playoffs, Versus simulcast the CBC's coverage of some games, generally first and second round matchups from Western Canada, instead of using their own crews and announcers. In the early 1990s, SportsChannel America covered the Stanley Cup playoffs in a similar fashion. Versus continued to use CBC and TSN feeds to augment its own playoff coverage, sometimes even picking up a Canadian broadcast of a game involving two American teams. (NBCSN, Versus' successor, does so as well - even incorporating coverage from Comcast-owned regional sports networks.)

In 2006, NBC televised game one of the Eastern Conference Finals between the Sabres and the Carolina Hurricanes on the same day as the Preakness. Before the game, Bill Clement advised the audience that in the event that the game went into overtime, it would be televised on Versus, or OLN as it was known at the time. The Sabres won the game in regulation.

Games 1 and 2 of the Stanley Cup Final were on OLN, while the remainder of the series was on NBC. NBC's broadcast of game seven drew a 3.3 rating, a 21% drop from ABC's 4.2 for game seven in 2004. However, some NBC affiliates didn't air game seven live. Overall, NBC had an average rating of 2.3 for its five telecasts of the final, down 12% from ABC's 2004 average.

=== 2007 ===
Olympic women's ice hockey champion Cassie Campbell joined Hockey Night in Canada in 2006 as a rinkside reporter, becoming (on October 14, 2006) the first woman to do colour commentary on a Hockey Night in Canada broadcast. She filled in when Harry Neale was snowed in at his home in Buffalo. (Helen Hutchinson was the first woman to appear on HNIC telecasts in 1974, when she did between-period interviews on the Wednesday night CTV telecasts.)

NBC's out-of-market games were available on NHL Center Ice through the 2006–07 season; NBC switched to stand-alone games for the 2007–08 season.

For the 2006–07 season, NBC broadcast three regional NHL games per weekend of coverage during the regular season. The network also scheduled ten coverage windows during the playoffs (not including the Stanley Cup Finals). The additional broadcasts were expected to replace the Arena Football League, which NBC dropped after the 2006 season. NBC also produced two games per week in high definition, up from one in 2005–06.

The newly titled NHL on NBC Game of the Week returned on January 13, 2007, with three regional games (between the Los Angeles and St. Louis Blues, Boston Bruins and New York Rangers, Pittsburgh Penguins and Philadelphia Flyers) at 2:00 p.m. Eastern Time. Games started at various times, ranging from 12:30 to 3:30 p.m. during the season (this variation primarily resulted from NBC's commitments to the PGA Tour and other programming).

NBC moved its NHL telecasts to Sundays after its season premiere (which occurred on a Saturday) for the final eight dates of the season. The nine weeks of games (totaling 22 regional games) scheduled by the network amounted to the league's most extensive U.S. broadcast television coverage since 1998, during Fox's tenure. A new Sunday Night Football-esque horizontal score banner, designed by Troika Design Group, also debuted during the season.

Versus' coverage of the 2007 All-Star Game garnered a .7 rating (474,298 viewing homes and 672,948 total viewers). Ratings were down 76% from ABC's ratings in 2004, the last time the game was played, and down 82% from ABC's coverage in 2000. However, some of that significant drop can be attributed to the game being played on a weeknight (Wednesday) as opposed to the traditional weekend game, and the fact that Versus is a cable television network unlike ABC which is a broadcast network. The 2008 All-Star Game was scheduled for a Sunday.

In 2007, Canadians accused the NHL of giving the CBC second billing to Versus' coverage of the playoffs.

On May 19, 2007, during the Stanley Cup playoffs, NBC angered many fans and journalists when it pre-empted coverage of the overtime period of the tied game five of the Eastern Conference Finals between the Ottawa Senators and Buffalo Sabres, instead going directly to pre-race coverage of the Preakness Stakes horse race. A typical "Triple Crown" horse racing broadcast generally contains about two hours of pre-race coverage, with the actual races lasting two or three minutes. Coverage of the overtime period was shifted to Versus, the league's cable partner, although viewers in Buffalo and Rochester were able to continue watching the game on local NBC affiliates in the respective markets, WGRZ and WHEC-TV.

The move was originally seen not only as a snub of small-market teams (such as the Sabres), but of hockey in general. However, NBC and the NHL later revealed that the Preakness deal had been made several years before and contained mandatory advertising commitments during the pre-race build-up. Both sides could have agreed that the entire game would air only on Versus or begin earlier in the day, but the NHL wanted at least one Eastern Conference Finals game to air on NBC, and said that it does not schedule with the assumption that games will go into overtime. Moreover, an earlier start time could not be arranged because the broadcast window was fixed in advance, and both the NHL and NBC needed the flexibility to pick the Western Conference Finals for that window if they so desired.

The 2007 Stanley Cup Final was also notable for its exceptionally poor television ratings in the United States. Games one and two were carried by cable channel Versus, then a new and little known player on the sports television scene. Game one produced a 0.5 national rating or 523,000 households. It was the 58th best rated program of that day. Game two produced a 0.4 national rating or 446,000 households, lower than the 2006 WNBA All-Star Game on ESPN which drew 447,000 households. It was the 74th best rated program of that day.

The move to NBC did little to compensate for the series' limited drawing power. A perennial last among the Big Four American television networks, NBC was at the time going through an intense period of ratings turmoil, setting lowest rated week records in several viewing categories over the course of spring 2007.

Game three's coverage on NBC garnered a mere 1.1 rating (approximately 1,205,600 households), making it the lowest rated prime-time broadcast in the network's history. For comparison, game six of the NBA Eastern Conference Finals, broadcast opposite game three on cable channel TNT, achieved a 5.3 rating, approximately 5,808,800 households. Game four achieved a 1.9 rating (approximately 2,082,400 households), down 5% from game four the previous year. Game five received slightly less, 1.8 (approximately 1,972,800 households). As a whole, NBC's ratings for the championship series were down 20 percent from the previous season, making it the least watched final in the United States.

At the time, Versus was only available to 50% of cable-equipped homes in the Los Angeles area, which hurt the buzz around the Ducks' playoff run in a traditionally crowded sports and entertainment market. Versus was the fifth-most watched cable network in the Los Angeles market for game one, good only for a 1.7 local rating.

Local numbers did improve as the series moved to free-to-air NBC. The Cup-clinching game five drew a 6.0 and a 12 share for an average audience of 496,000 viewers in the Los Angeles market, more than double that of a high-profile regular season game between baseball's Los Angeles Dodgers and San Diego Padres on KCAL 9 (3.0/5, 218,000 viewers). This symbolic, if short-lived, win over one of the region's flagship teams allowed the Ducks to close the series on a relatively high note, with the Los Angeles Times' Larry Stewart calling their final ratings performance "pretty good".

At the end of July 2007, RDS and the Montreal Canadiens extended their exclusive broadcasting rights contract through 2013. The deal included all of the Canadiens' 82 regular season games and all of their playoff games, if need be (none of this precludes CBC Sports from televising games in English as part of Hockey Night in Canada). Also, RDS had exclusive rights to French television broadcasting rights for the NHL All-Star Game and Skills Competition, as well as one NHL game per week that did not involve the Canadiens and a minimum of 40 playoff games for either RDS or RDS Info. The Canadiens also granted RDS exclusive rights to 'new media' coverage for the team (i.e., cell-phone TV, podcast and others).

Most other broadcast contracts were acquired through TSN and ESPN.

=== 2008 ===
Under the terms of the contract running from 2007–2011, Versus aired 54 or more NHL games each season, generally on Monday and Tuesday nights, and provided coverage of as many Stanley Cup Playoff games as possible (generally two per night in the first two rounds; the Conference Finals are usually played on alternating days), and two games of the Stanley Cup Final (Games three and four in 2009, 2010 and 2011).

For the 2007–08 season (HDNet's final season of NHL coverage), HDNet premiered the weekly program entitled Inside the NHL. Hosted by Dan Moriarty, Inside the NHL featured programming regarding the upcoming game airing on HDNet, in-depth interviews with the biggest stars in the NHL, the latest news from around league, the top highlights from the current week, and unique features showcasing NHL's biggest stars as well as celebrity fans. Inside the NHL was shot on the location of every HDNet Thursday night NHL game.

Beginning in 2007–08, NBC incorporated "flex scheduling" for its NHL coverage, similar to NFL broadcasts. Through this method, the league selects at least three potential games at the start of the season for most of NBC's regular-season coverage dates. Thirteen days prior to the game, NBC then selects one to air as its Game of the Week, then the other two games move outside of NBC's broadcast window and return to teams' regional carriers. Since the league made network coverage a priority in the 1990s, regionalized coverage had been the norm; NBC is the first network to attempt to regularly present one game to the entire country. Additionally, studio segments began to originate from the game site instead of 30 Rockefeller Center. All game telecasts also began to be produced in 1080i high definition.

NBC began its 2007–08 schedule on January 1, 2008, with the NHL Winter Classic, an outdoor hockey game between the Buffalo Sabres and Pittsburgh Penguins at Ralph Wilson Stadium. The game went head-to-head with some of the New Year's Day college football bowl games, but none of the feature Bowl Championship Series games. While never expected to beat or directly compete with football ratings, the timing was designed to take advantage of the large audience flipping between channels to watch the different bowl games. It was the first such game to be televised live by an American network and the NHL's first outdoor regular season game since the Edmonton Oilers and Montreal Canadiens played the Heritage Classic, which aired on CBC, which served as the Canadian broadcaster of the 2008 Classic. Although originally maligned as a mere publicity stunt by some in the media, the 2008 Winter Classic drew a 2.6 rating in the U.S. (or about 2.9 million viewers) according to Nielsen, the highest rating for a regular-season contest since February 1996, when Fox was the league's network partner. By comparison, CBS received a 2.7 rating for the Gator Bowl, which also had a 1:00 p.m. start.

Beginning that season, all regular season telecasts air mainly on Sunday afternoons, except for those occurring the day after Thanksgiving and on New Year's Day.

In April 2008, NBC announced the activation of its option to retain broadcasting rights for the 2008–09 season. NBC's scheduling for that year was similar to that which it had during the 2007–08 season (flex scheduling for regular-season games, up to five games of the Stanley Cup Final – changing in 2009 to include the first two and last three games, among others) except that all (or nearly all) of the Sunday-afternoon games now began at 12:30 p.m. Eastern Time. Coverage again included the Winter Classic outdoor game on January 1, 2009, between the Detroit Red Wings and the Chicago Blackhawks at Wrigley Field.

In 2007–08, NHL audiences on Versus in the United States remained small, but increased over the previous two seasons. Versus averaged 246,154 viewers a game, up 24 percent from the previous year. Over the year, channel distribution increased to 73.6 million households from 70.8 million. Conference Finals ratings were averaging a 1.2 HH rating. Game two between the Flyers and Penguins drew a 1.7 HH rating, 2.3 million viewers; an NHL record on Versus.

In June 2008, CTVglobemedia acquired the rights to "The Hockey Theme" after the CBC failed to renew its rights to the theme song. A re-orchestrated version of the tune, which had been the theme song of Hockey Night in Canada for forty years, has been used for hockey broadcasts on TSN and RDS since the fall of 2008.

TSN announced on the September 24, 2008 edition of SportsCentre the debut date for the song. It began on October 14, when the Colorado Avalanche visited the Calgary Flames.

=== 2009 ===
Beginning with the 2008–09 season, Hockey Nights main games were simulcast weekly in the United States on NHL Network, complete with pre- and post-game shows. If U.S.-based teams appear in these games, the telecast is blacked out in the markets of the participating teams or is televised instead by the U.S. team's local broadcaster. For example, if the Toronto Maple Leafs host the Boston Bruins in "Hockey Night"'s main game, the NHL Network's telecast is blacked-out in the Boston area and the game is instead televised by the Boston-based New England Sports Network (NESN). In the 2009–10 season, only the first game of the HNIC doubleheader is simulcast live on NHL Network, with the second game and post-game After Hours program being shown in tape delay on Sunday, the sole exception being the Hockey Day in Canada event. Since the Rogers takeover, however, HNIC games on NHL Network now feature games regardless of broadcaster (either CBC or a Rogers network).

Changes were made to HNIC and TSN's playoff coverage starting in 2009, with TSN having third, fifth, seventh, and eighth choices of first-round series, second and fourth in the second round, and second in the Conference Finals. These changes allowed TSN to broadcast playoff games involving Canadian teams, such as at the 2009 Stanley Cup Playoffs, as TSN televised the Calgary Flames' first-round series against the Chicago Blackhawks, the 2010 Stanley Cup Playoffs when the Montreal Canadiens defeated the Washington Capitals in seven games, and the 2013 Stanley Cup Playoffs when the Vancouver Canucks lost in four straight games to the San Jose Sharks.

NBC broadcast the first two and final three games of the Stanley Cup Final, while Versus broadcast games three and four. The first two games of the series were played on consecutive nights due to NBC's scheduling.

Game seven was the final major sporting event on analog television in the United States, with the DTV transition finishing less than an hour-and-a-half after the game ended and just one hour after NBC coverage ended. NBC affiliates WDIV-TV in Detroit and WPXI in Pittsburgh – who months before the Stanley Cup playoffs began electing to keep their own respective analog signals on until June 12, well past the original February 17 deadline – both remained on the air for game seven before cutting their analog signals at 11:59 EDT.
