= 2009 NHL Winter Classic =

Outdoor National Hockey League game in Chicago, Illinois

	1	2	3	Total
Detroit Red Wings	1	3	2	6
Chicago Blackhawks	3	0	1	4
- Date: January 1, 2009
- Venue: Wrigley Field
- City: Chicago
- Attendance: 40,818

The 2009 NHL Winter Classic (known via corporate sponsorship as the Bridgestone NHL Winter Classic 2009) was an outdoor ice hockey game played in the National Hockey League (NHL) on January 1, 2009, at Wrigley Field in Chicago. The second edition of the Winter Classic, it matched the Chicago Blackhawks against the defending Stanley Cup champion Detroit Red Wings in the 701st game between the Central Division rivals. The Red Wings won the game, 6–4, despite falling behind 3–1 in the first period. It was the first Winter Classic to involve at least one of the Original Six teams, and the first to feature teams from the Western Conference.

The two teams wore vintage-style uniforms, using Reebok Edge equipment and material. The Red Wings wore a version of the sweaters worn by the Detroit Cougars in 1926–27, their first season in the NHL, but with their familiar "Winged Wheel" logo on the shoulders. The Blackhawks wore sweaters which were a mix of their 1936–37 sweaters and their 1937–38 sweaters, with the design from 1936 to 1937 and the chest crest from 1937 to 1938.

== Host selection ==
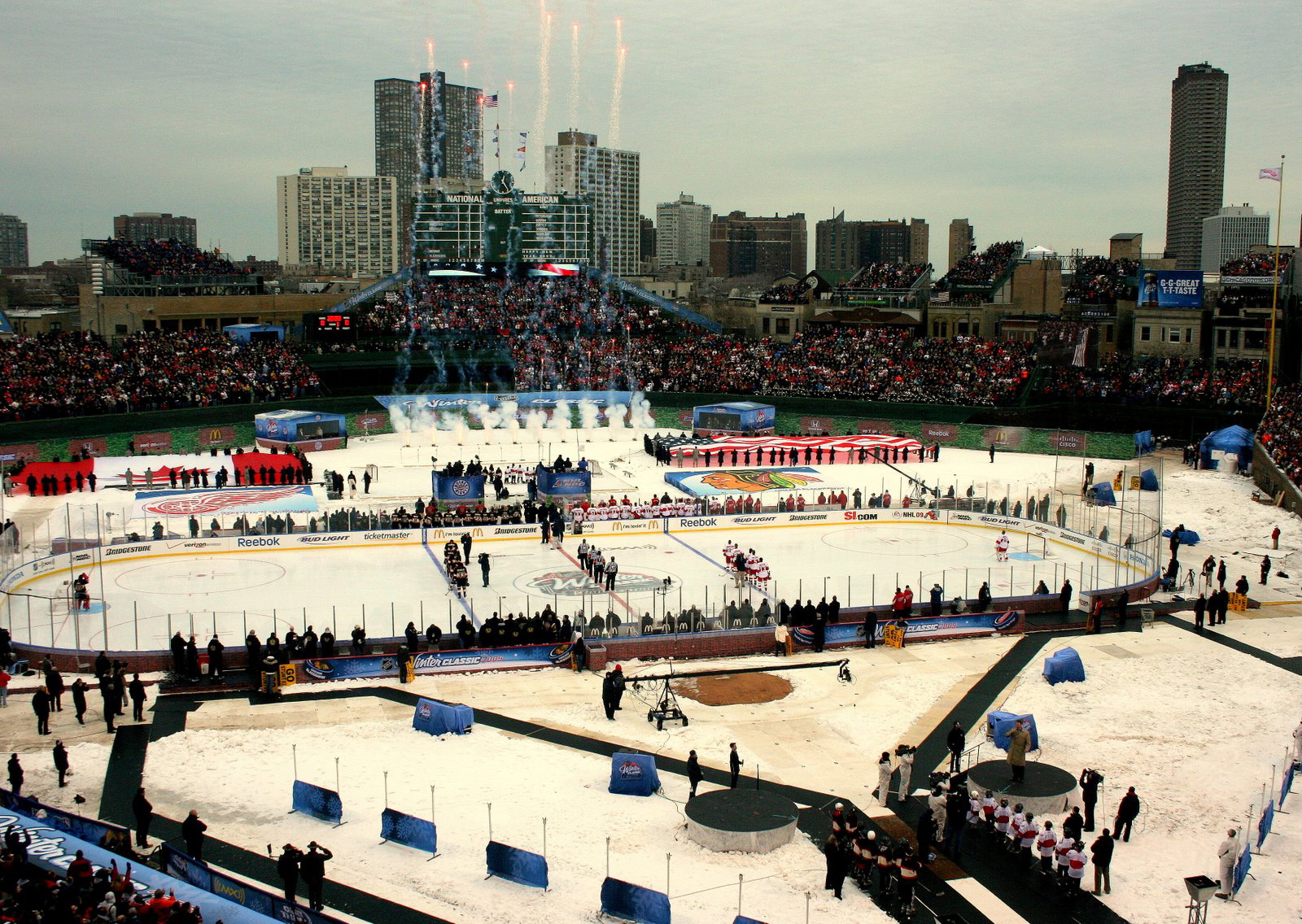
View of the rink immediately prior to the start of the game

On May 29, 2008, TSN reported that Chicago was chosen to host the annual outdoor game over New York City, the other host finalist for the game. A game in New York City would have been played at the original Yankee Stadium, which closed after hosting the New York Yankees from 1923 to 2008. Logistical concerns, however, forced New York out because the stadium was to be demolished; if the game had been played at Yankee Stadium, it would have been the last event in that building.

Beaver Stadium, the second largest outdoor sports venue in North America and the home of the Penn State Nittany Lions football team, was also in consideration, with that location likely only if the two teams were the Pittsburgh Penguins and Philadelphia Flyers; because the Penguins had played in the previous Winter Classic, this scenario was ultimately rejected for 2009.

Original reports said the game was going be played at Soldier Field. However, the Chicago Bears objected to the use of Soldier Field, citing the potential to host an NFL playoff game on the following weekend. On July 6, the Minneapolis Star Tribune reported that Wrigley Field, home of the Chicago Cubs, was chosen to host the game. Ten days later, on July 16, the Blackhawks and the NHL confirmed the site and date. There had never been a hockey game at Wrigley Field in the past, and in addition, the rink was left up until January 4 for community skates at The Friendly Confines, with the $10 admission for an hour of skating donated to Cubs Care charities, which was sold out.

== Preparations ==
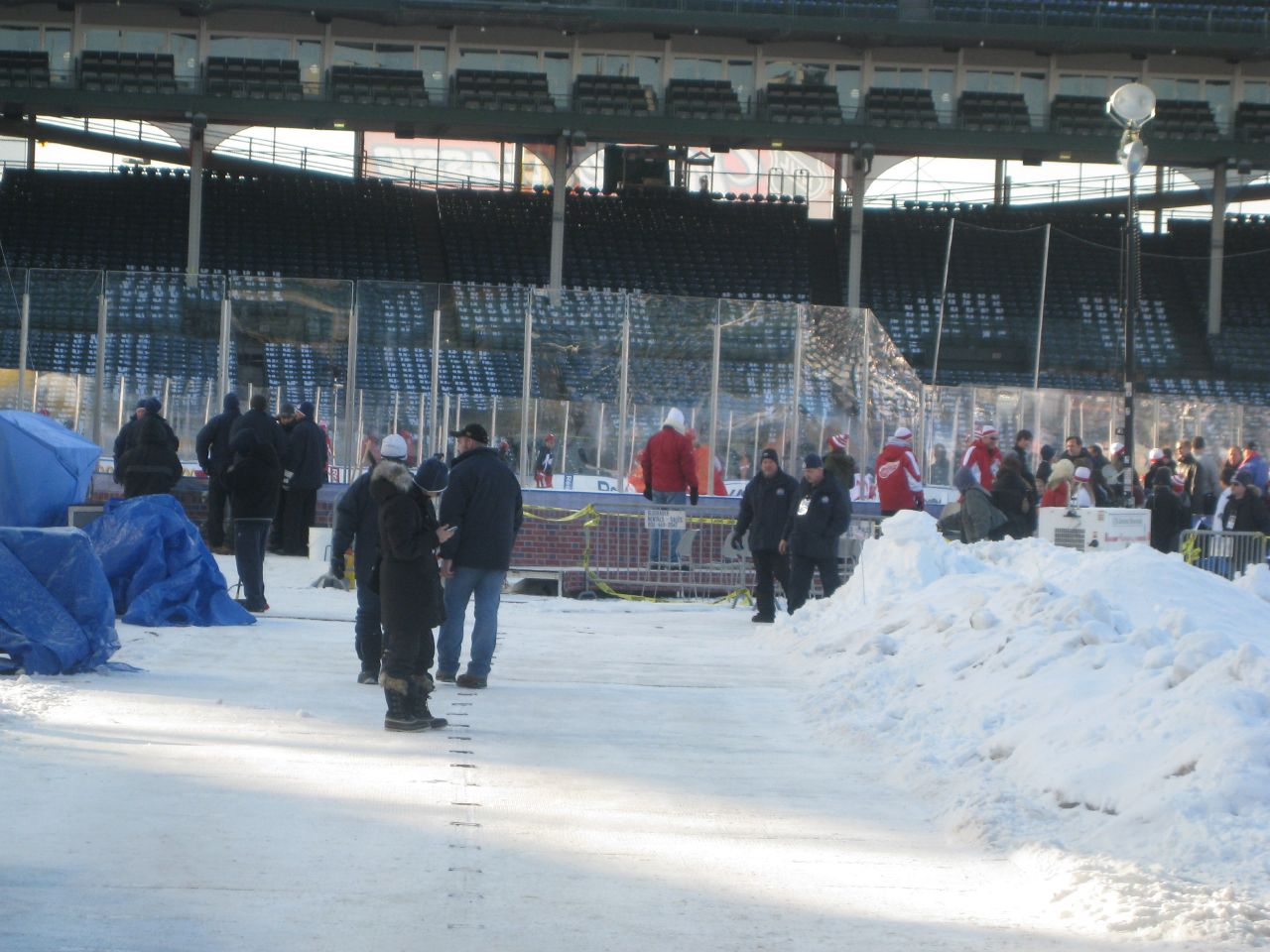
Rink at Wrigley Field, photographed on December 21, 2008

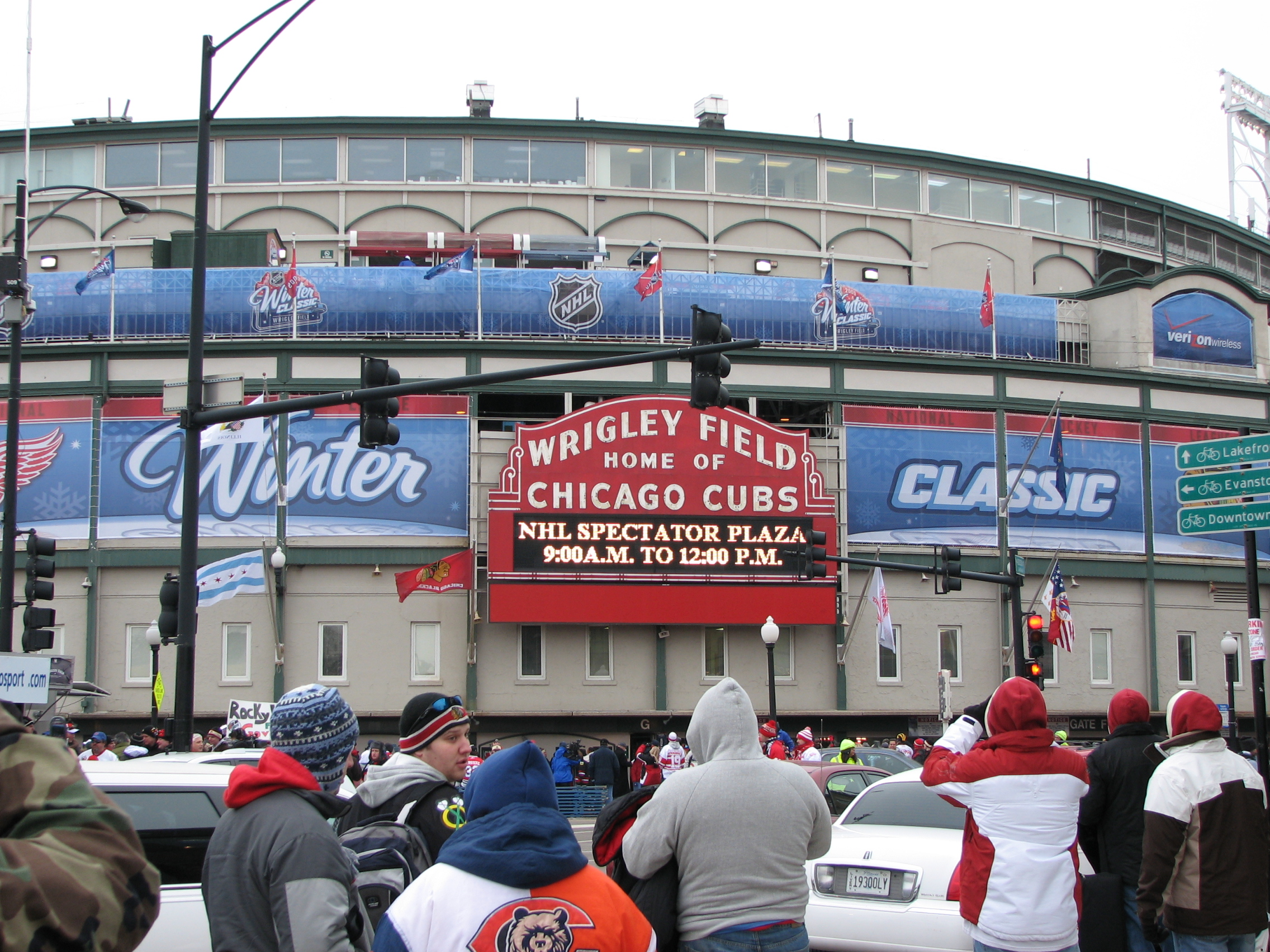
Fans outside Wrigley Field, prior to the game

Construction of the ice rink began on December 16, 2008, eight days earlier than last season's Classic. It was again being supervised by Dan Craig, the NHL's facilities operations manager. This time, the crew did not have to wait for any other sport to be played in the stadium, so there was more time to prepare the venue for the Classic. The rink was built from the bottom with plywood and aluminum panels, the latter of which have tubes to move coolant under the ice to maintain a cold temperature. The coolant comes from a truck based outside of the ballpark.

The NHL had a Spectator Plaza outside of Wrigley Field at the intersection of West Waveland and North Clark Streets. This included ticket giveaways, live music, interactive games, ice sculpting and other entertainment on the day of the Classic.

The 95-year legacy of Wrigley Field as a baseball venue resulted in several nods to baseball. The exterior of the rink was decorated to resemble the low brick wall that fronts the box seating area at the ballpark. Cubs' Hall of Famers Billy Williams, Ferguson Jenkins and Ryne Sandberg were on hand for the pregame ceremonies, along with several retired Blackhawks players. About halfway through the third period, Sandberg along with Bobby Hull, Stan Mikita and Denis Savard sang a variation on "Take Me Out to the Ball Game" with a few word changes to reference hockey.

== Pregame ==
The national anthems were performed by Scott Newlands ("O Canada") and Chicago Blackhawks anthem singer, Jim Cornelison ("The Star-Spangled Banner").

== Rule changes ==
As with the 2008 game in Ralph Wilson Stadium, the NHL announced a rule change to account for any possible adverse weather conditions. Taking into account high winds which are common during baseball games at Wrigley Field, the teams changed sides at the first whistle after the halfway point of the third period. This was done at exactly the halfway point of the third in 2008 because of falling snow.

== Media coverage ==
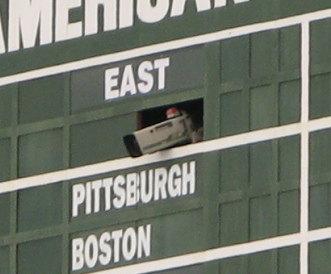
Television camera positioned from inside of Wrigley Field's center field scoreboard

Television coverage of the game was handled in the United States by NBC. Mike Emrick, the lead play-by-play announcer for NBC, was not able to call play-by-play for the game due to laryngitis. He was replaced by Dave Strader. Eddie Olczyk, Pierre McGuire, Darren Pang, and Mike Milbury again provided analysis. In Canada, CBC carried the game in English and RDS broadcast in French. NASN televised the game live overseas in the United Kingdom, where it started at 6 p.m. local time. Additionally, NHL.com offered bonus video coverage. The radio feed was broadcast by NHL Radio on Westwood One throughout North America, excluding the markets of the competing teams, and was carried by Sirius XM Radio. In addition, the American and Canadian versions of the NHL Network carried programming bookending the event starting with the practice sessions one day earlier, as well as the pre-game and post-game events and offered replays that weekend using both NBC's and CBC's feeds.

=== Television ratings ===
One reason that the NHL does the outdoor game is to promote the League on television. The television ratings will partially determine if the outdoor game events will continue. On January 3, 2009, the NHL reported that the "overnight television ratings" had increased 12% over the 2008 game. Nationally, the game had a 2.9 overnight rating and a 6 share. In Chicago, Thursday's game drew a national high of an 11.8 rating and 21 share, with Detroit second at 10.5 and 21 (this despite that yet again, a Michigan-based team was playing in the Capital One Bowl opposite the Winter Classic, the Michigan State Spartans). Other above-average markets included Buffalo (whose 10.1 rating/20 share was comparable to Detroit's), St. Louis (5.3/10), Pittsburgh (4.4/8), Denver (4.2/10), Providence (3.5/7), Indianapolis (3.4/6), West Palm Beach (3.3/6) and Orlando (3.2/5). Each overnight ratings point equals about 735,000 TV homes. On January 12, the final ratings figure was announced. There was an average of 4.4 million viewers of the game on NBC, and this was the largest since the February 23, 1975, match between the Philadelphia Flyers and the New York Rangers.

== Game summary ==
Jan 1, 2009	Detroit Red Wings	6–4	Chicago Blackhawks	Wrigley Field	Recap

The Red Wings dressed seven defensemen for the game, as they did in their prior game, to account for Nicklas Lidstrom returning from an ankle injury. Healthy scratches included forward Tomas Kopecky and defenseman Derek Meech. The Blackhawks scratched forward Adam Burish and defenseman Aaron Johnson. Ty Conklin started in goal for the Red Wings, making him the only player to take the ice for all three regular season NHL outdoor games (after having played for the Edmonton Oilers in the Heritage Classic in 2003 and the Pittsburgh Penguins in the 2008 NHL Winter Classic). During the intermissions, members of the Northwestern University Wildcat Marching Band and the Northern Illinois University Huskie Marching Band played on the field to entertain the crowd.

The first three combined goals were scored on the power play. The Red Wings paid for a mistake while they were already shorthanded, having too many players on the ice, putting them down by two men. Rookie winger Kris Versteeg scored the first goal of the game for the Blackhawks with three seconds left in the two-man advantage. The Red Wings' Mikael Samuelsson scored with three seconds remaining on his team's second power play which was the result of a Dustin Byfuglien roughing minor that was called during one of the many post-whistle scrums during the first period. Martin Havlat capitalized on another Red Wings mistake, scoring on the power play that resulted from Brett Lebda shooting the puck over the glass from his defensive zone. Ben Eager closed the scoring in the first period with a wrap-around goal.

Detroit scored the next five goals, the first two from Jiri Hudler and the next from Pavel Datsyuk at even-strength in the second period. Datsyuk's goal was hailed as being wind-assisted, since Datsyuk picked up a burst of speed as he went between two Blackhawks defenders to find a clear path to the net. In the third period, defenseman Brian Rafalski scored the eventual game-winning goal on the power play. Seventeen seconds later, Brett Lebda scored the Red Wings' final goal, chasing Cristobal Huet from the net, with Nikolai Khabibulin taking over for him. In his 16:36 of play, Khabibulin saved all 13 shots that he faced, after Huet saved 24 of 30 shots. Duncan Keith closed the scoring for Chicago on the power play with less than ten seconds remaining. Conklin made 33 saves for the Red Wings on 37 shots.

Scoring summary
Period	Team	Goal	Assist(s)	Time	Score
1st	CHI	Kris Versteeg (11) – pp	Martin Havlat (18) and Brent Seabrook (7)	03:24	1–0 CHI
1st	DET	Mikael Samuelsson (8) – pp	Henrik Zetterberg (18) and Marian Hossa (18)	09:50	1–1
1st	CHI	Martin Havlat (10) – pp	Kris Versteeg (20) and Brian Campbell (21)	12:37	2–1 CHI
1st	CHI	Ben Eager (7)	Martin Havlat (19)	19:18	3–1 CHI
2nd	DET	Jiri Hudler (14)	Marian Hossa (19) and Henrik Zetterberg (19)	01:14	3–2 CHI
2nd	DET	Jiri Hudler (15)	Brian Rafalski (24) and Nicklas Lidstrom (20)	12:43	3–3
2nd	DET	Pavel Datsyuk (16)	Johan Franzen (10) and Brian Rafalski (25)	17:17	4–3 DET
3rd	DET	Brian Rafalski (5) – pp	Jiri Hudler (17) and Tomas Holmstrom (13)	03:07	5–3 DET
3rd	DET	Brett Lebda (3)	Henrik Zetterberg (20) and Marian Hossa (20)	3:24	6–3 DET
3rd	CHI	Duncan Keith (5) – pp	Patrick Sharp (12) and Jonathan Toews (20)	19:50	6–4 DET

Number in parentheses represents the player's total in goals or assists to that point of the season

Penalty summary
Period	Team	Player	Penalty	Time	PIM
1st	DET	Pavel Datsyuk	Hooking	0:37	2:00
1st	DET	Bench (seved by Jiri Hudler)	Too many men on the ice	02:06	2:00
1st	CHI	Ben Eager	Slashing	04:52	2:00
1st	CHI	Dustin Byfuglien	Roughing	07:53	2:00
1st	DET	Brett Lebda	Delay of game (puck over glass)	11:27	2:00
1st	DET	Andreas Lilja	Roughing	13:01	2:00
2nd	DET	Marian Hossa	Goaltender interference	04:28	2:00
2nd	CHI	Jonathan Toews	High-sticking	04:35	2:00
2nd	CHI	Brian Campbell	Tripping	10:42	2:00
3rd	CHI	James Wisniewski	Holding	2:20	2:00
3rd	DET	Valtteri Filppula	Holding	19:07	2:00

Shots by period
Team	1	2	3	Total
Detroit	13	13	17	43
Chicago	14	13	10	37

Power play opportunities
Team	Goals/Opportunities
Detroit	2/5
Chicago	3/6

== Team rosters ==
Detroit Red Wings
#		Player	Position
3	(Sweden)	Andreas Lilja	D
5	(Sweden)	Nicklas Lidstrom (C)	D
11	(Canada)	Daniel Cleary	RW
13	(Russia)	Pavel Datsyuk	C
18	(Canada)	Kirk Maltby	RW
22	(United States)	Brett Lebda	D
23	(Canada)	Brad Stuart	D
24	(United States)	Chris Chelios	D
26	(Czech Republic)	Jiri Hudler	LW
28	(United States)	Brian Rafalski	D
29	(United States)	Ty Conklin	G
30	(Canada)	Chris Osgood	G
33	(Canada)	Kris Draper (A)	C
37	(Sweden)	Mikael Samuelsson	RW
40	(Sweden)	Henrik Zetterberg (A)	C
51	(Finland)	Valtteri Filppula	C
55	(Sweden)	Niklas Kronwall	D
81	(Slovakia)	Marian Hossa	RW
93	(Sweden)	Johan Franzen	LW
96	(Sweden)	Tomas Holmstrom	RW
Head coach: (Canada) Mike Babcock

Chicago Blackhawks
#		Player	Position
2	(Canada)	Duncan Keith (A)	D
7	(Canada)	Brent Seabrook	D
8	(Canada)	Matt Walker	D
10	(Canada)	Patrick Sharp (A)	C
16	(Canada)	Andrew Ladd	LW
19	(Canada)	Jonathan Toews (C)	C
22	(Canada)	Troy Brouwer	RW
24	(Czech Republic)	Martin Havlat	RW
25	(Canada)	Cam Barker	D
28	(Canada)	Craig Adams	RW
32	(Canada)	Kris Versteeg	LW
33	(United States)	Dustin Byfuglien	LW
36	(Canada)	Dave Bolland	C
38	(France)	Cristobal Huet	G
39	(Russia)	Nikolai Khabibulin	G
43	(United States)	James Wisniewski	D
46	(Canada)	Colin Fraser	C
51	(Canada)	Brian Campbell	D
55	(Canada)	Ben Eager	LW
88	(United States)	Patrick Kane	RW
Head coach: (Canada) Joel Quenneville

Chris Osgood served as the backup goalie for the Red Wings and did not enter the game.

=== Scratches ===
- Detroit Red Wings: Tomas Kopecky, Derek Meech
- Chicago Blackhawks: Aaron Johnson, Adam Burish

=== Officials ===
- Referees — Bill McCreary, Tim Peel
- Linesmen — Andy McElman, Dan Schachte

== Lost Logo Challenge ==
Reebok sponsored a contest known as the "NHL Winter Classic Reebok Lost Logo Challenge," which challenged fans to find the one player on the ice without a Reebok logo on the back of his jersey. The player without the logo, therefore the correct entry to the contest, was Dustin Byfuglien of the Blackhawks. All RBK Edge sweaters have a Reebok vector logo near the top of the jersey above the player's nameplate, but this one jersey had no logo stitched in that position. Each person attending the game was given binoculars and was able to enter the contest by cell phone; television viewers could enter the contest online. Entries were accepted through the first two periods, at which time two winners, one inside Wrigley Field and one home viewer, were selected from those who chose the correct player. Each winner received an identical prize: a trip to a Stanley Cup Final game and a $1,000 gift certificate to NHL.com.

== See also ==
- 2008–09 Chicago Blackhawks season
- 2008–09 Detroit Red Wings season
- List of outdoor ice hockey games
- List of ice hockey games with highest attendance
