= 2008 Red Wings season =

2008 Red Wings season can refer to:

In ice hockey:

- 2007-08 Detroit Red Wings season
- 2008-09 Detroit Red Wings season

In baseball:

- 2008 Rochester Red Wings season
