= 2008–09 Chicago Blackhawks season =

National Hockey League team season

2008–09 Chicago Blackhawks
- Division: 2nd Central
- Conference: 4th Western
- 2008–09 record: 46–24–12
- Home record: 24–9–8
- Road record: 22–15–4
- Goals for: 264
- Goals against: 216

Team information
- General manager: Dale Tallon
- Coach: Denis Savard; Joel Quenneville
- Captain: Jonathan Toews
- Alternate captains: Duncan Keith; Patrick Sharp
- Arena: United Center; Wrigley Field (1 game)
- Average attendance: 22,247 (21,783, 106.2% at UC); Capacity: 20,500; Total: 912,155 (871,337 at UC)

Team leaders
- Goals: Jonathan Toews (34)
- Assists: Martin Havlat (48)
- Points: Martin Havlat (77)
- Penalty minutes: Ben Eager (161)
- Plus/minus: Duncan Keith (+33)
- Wins: Nikolai Khabibulin (25)
- Goals against average: Nikolai Khabibulin (2.33)

The 2008–09 Chicago Blackhawks season was the 83rd season for the National Hockey League (NHL) franchise that was established on September 25, 1926. Prior to the start of the season, the Blackhawks announced that 20-year-old center Jonathan Toews would serve as the team's captain for the 2008–09 season, thus making him the 3rd-youngest player to earn that distinction in the NHL. Their regular season began on October 10, 2008, against the New York Rangers and concluded on April 12, 2009, against the rival Detroit Red Wings. The Blackhawks played in the Winter Classic, an outdoor game, against the Red Wings at Wrigley Field on January 1, 2009. The team succeeded in making the 2008–09 playoffs with a 3–1 win over Nashville on April 3 after missing the 2007–08 playoffs by three points.

== Pre-season ==
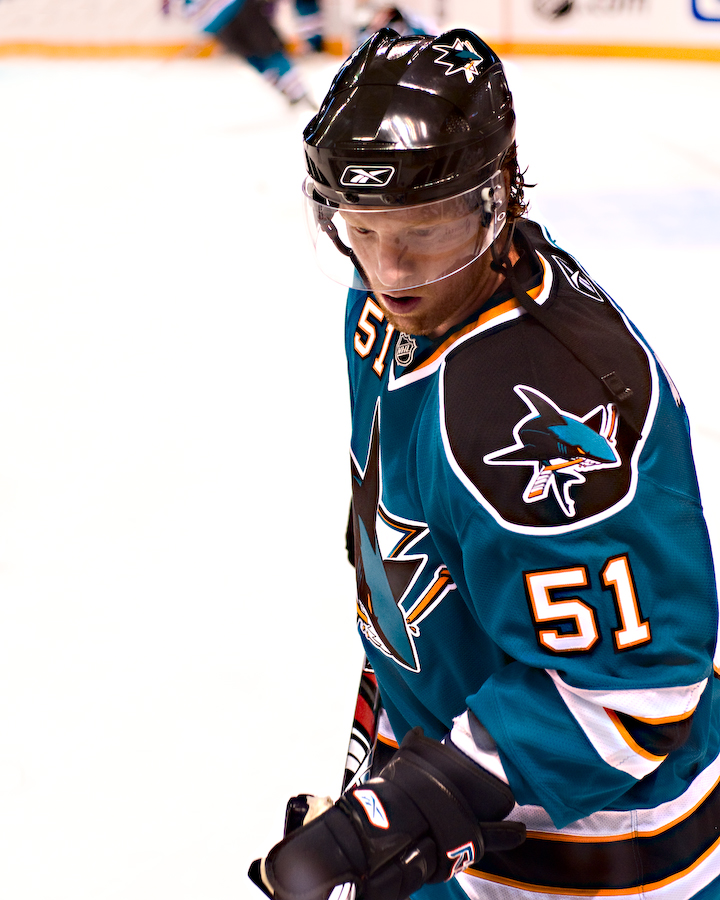
The Blackhawks signed defenseman Brian Campbell, seen here with the San Jose Sharks, to the largest contract in team history.

The Chicago Blackhawks had a busy offseason following the 2007–08 regular season. In late April, a few weeks after the season concluded, the Blackhawks announced that they were entering a three-year partnership with WGN (720 AM); they previously aired games on WSCR (670 AM). This coincided with a previous announcement that the team would air up to twenty games on WGN's TV affiliate. The club also brought back announcer Pat Foley to do the play-by-play announcing for all television broadcasts.

The Blackhawks made a "huge splash" on the first day of free agency by signing defenseman Brian Campbell and goaltender Cristobal Huet. Campbell's $57.12 million contract was the largest in team history. Along with Campbell and Huet, the Blackhawks signed three other free agents, while losing three to other teams. Long-time Detroit Red Wings coach Scotty Bowman joined the organization in late July as Senior Advisor of Hockey Operations. The Hawks also added Rockford IceHogs head coach Mike Haviland as an assistant coach, and signed former Colorado Avalanche coach Joel Quenneville as a scout.

On July 16, 2008, the NHL announced that the Blackhawks would host the second outdoor NHL Winter Classic on January 1, 2009, at Wrigley Field against the rival Detroit Red Wings. The game will be the 701st meeting between the two clubs, and the Blackhawks will wear uniforms similar to those they wore during the 1936–37 season.

The team also announced that they intended to retire jersey number #3 in honor of defensemen Pierre Pilote and Keith Magnuson. Hockey Hall of Famer Pilote spent thirteen seasons with the Hawks, winning the James Norris Memorial Trophy as the NHL's best defenseman on three occasions. Magnuson accumulated over 1,400 penalty minutes in eleven years with the team. Magnuson was the president of the Blackhawks Alumni Association before he died in an automobile accident in 2003.

2008 Pre-season game log: 5–1–2 (Home: 3–0–1; Road: 2–1–1)
#	Date	Opponent	Score	OT	Decision	Arena	Attendance	Record	Recap
1	September 23	Columbus Blue Jackets	4–3		Crawford	United Center	18,752	1–0–0	W1
2	September 26	Minnesota Wild	4–3		Huet	United Center	18,034	2–0–0	W2
3	September 28	Dallas Stars	4–3		Niemi	United Center	18,425	3–0–0	W3
4	September 29	@ Columbus Blue Jackets	7–1		Huet	Nationwide Arena	10,508	3–1–0	L1
5	September 30	@ Minnesota Wild	3–2	OT	Crawford	Xcel Energy Center	18,064	3–1–1	OTL1
6	October 2	@ Dallas Stars	4–3	SO	Niemi	American Airlines Center	15,142	4–1–1	W1
7	October 3	@ Colorado Avalanche	7–4		Huet	Pepsi Center	N/A	5–1–1	W2
8	October 5	Colorado Avalanche	4–3	OT	Huet	United Center	18,053	5–1–2	OTL1

== Season events ==
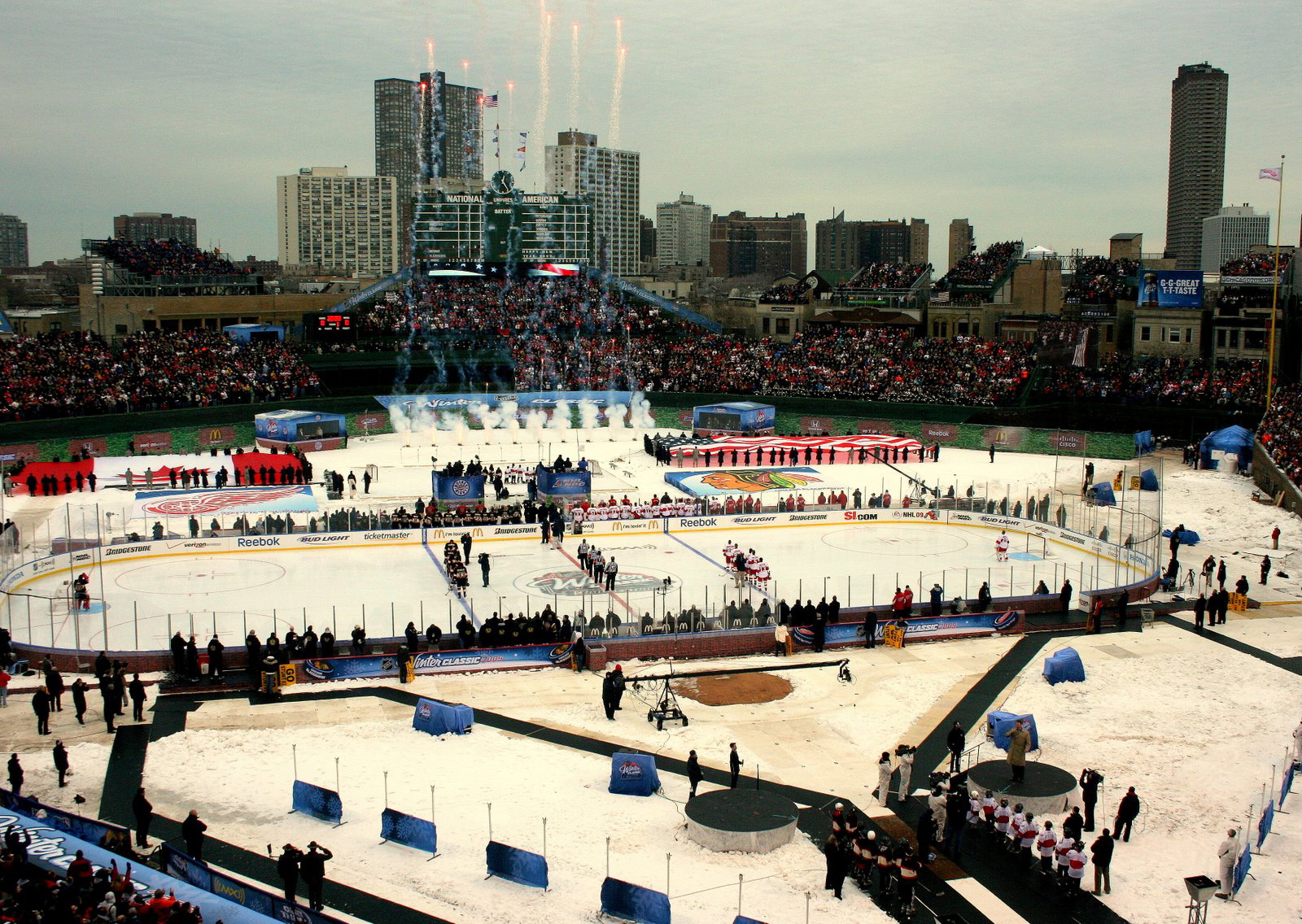
The 2009 NHL Winter Classic at Wrigley Field.

The Chicago Blackhawks opened the season against the New York Rangers at Madison Square Garden on October 10, 2008. After winning only one of their first four games, the Blackhawks fired head coach Denis Savard. Shortly afterwards, they promoted scout Joel Quenneville as his replacement. In 147 games as coach, Savard posted a 65–66–16 record.

In December, an anonymous Blackhawks fan submitted an email to Mike Ross of XM Radio's NHL Home Ice, which revealed that the team had interrupted their travel schedule to attend the wake of general manager Dale Tallon's father. The team voted to delay their flight to Chicago during a six-game road trip in order to travel to the wake, which was in Northern Canada. The team reached the wake on two buses, and surprised Tallon, who was unaware of the team's plans. Ross was shocked that no media outlets had initially reported the story, and commented, "Its amazing that such a good story can be found nowhere on the internet, and not even mentioned in the Chicago papers. Had one of the Blackhawks got into a fight and punched some drunken loser in a Toronto bar it would be plastered all over papers and the television." The story eventually garnered much attention from various media outlets in the following week, including ESPN, Yahoo! Sports and Deadspin. MSNBC's Keith Olbermann commended the team's actions, by naming them the "best persons in the world" for the week.

On December 28, 2008, the Blackhawks set a franchise record nine consecutive wins.

== Division standings ==
Central Division
		GP	W	L	OTL	GF	GA	Pts
**1**	**y – Detroit Red Wings**	**82**	**51**	**21**	**10**	**295**	**244**	**112**
**2**	**Chicago Blackhawks**	**82**	**46**	**24**	**12**	**264**	**216**	**104**
**3**	**St. Louis Blues**	**82**	**41**	**31**	**10**	**233**	**233**	**92**
**4**	**Columbus Blue Jackets**	**82**	**41**	**31**	**10**	**226**	**230**	**92**
5	Nashville Predators	82	40	34	8	213	233	88

=== Conference standings ===
Western Conference
R		Div	GP	W	L	OTL	GF	GA	Pts
**1**	**p – San Jose Sharks**	**PA**	**82**	**53**	**18**	**11**	**257**	**204**	117
**2**	**y – Detroit Red Wings**	**CE**	**82**	**51**	**21**	**10**	**295**	**244**	112
**3**	**y – Vancouver Canucks**	**NW**	**82**	**45**	**27**	**10**	**246**	**220**	100
**4**	**Chicago Blackhawks**	**CE**	**82**	**46**	**24**	**12**	**264**	**216**	104
**5**	**Calgary Flames**	**NW**	**82**	**46**	**30**	**6**	**254**	**248**	98
**6**	**St. Louis Blues**	**CE**	**82**	**41**	**31**	**10**	**233**	**233**	92
**7**	**Columbus Blue Jackets**	**CE**	**82**	**41**	**31**	**10**	**226**	**230**	92
**8**	**Anaheim Ducks**	**PA**	**82**	**42**	**33**	**7**	**245**	**238**	91
8.5
9	Minnesota Wild	NW	82	40	33	9	219	200	89
10	Nashville Predators	CE	82	40	34	8	213	233	88
11	Edmonton Oilers	NW	82	38	35	9	234	248	85
12	Dallas Stars	PA	82	36	35	11	230	257	83
13	Phoenix Coyotes	PA	82	36	39	7	208	252	79
14	Los Angeles Kings	PA	82	34	37	11	207	234	79
15	Colorado Avalanche	NW	82	32	45	5	199	257	69

bold – qualified for playoffs, y – division winner, p – Presidents' Trophy winner
CE – Central Division, NW – Northwest Division, PA – Pacific Division

== Schedule and results ==
Legend: Win (2 points) Loss (0 points) Overtime/shootout loss (1 point)

2008–09 Game log

October: 4–3–3 (Home: 4–0–2; Road: 0–3–1)
#	Date	Opponent	Score	OT	Decision	Arena	Attendance	Record	Pts	Recap
1	October 10	@ New York Rangers	4–2		Huet	Madison Square Garden	18,200	0–1–0	0	L1
2	October 11	@ Washington Capitals	4–2		Khabibulin	Verizon Center	18,277	0–2–0	0	L2
3	October 13	Nashville Predators	3–2	SO	Huet	United Center	21,712	0–2–1	1	SOL1
4	October 15	Phoenix Coyotes	4–1		Khabibulin	United Center	20,522	1–2–1	3	W1
5	October 18	@ St. Louis Blues	4–3	SO	Khabibulin	Scottrade Center	19,150	1–2–2	4	SOL1
6	October 19	Vancouver Canucks	4–2		Huet	United Center	21,193	2–2–2	6	W1
7	October 22	Edmonton Oilers	3–0		Khabibulin	United Center	21,168	3–2–2	8	W2
8	October 25	Detroit Red Wings	6–5	SO	Khabibulin	United Center	22,690	3–2–3	9	SOL1
9	October 27	@ Minnesota Wild	3–2		Huet	Xcel Energy Center	18,568	3–3–3	9	L1
10	October 31	Dallas Stars	5–2		Khabibulin	United Center	21,212	4–3–3	11	W1

November: 6–3–3 (Home: 2–1–2; Road: 4–2–1)
#	Date	Opponent	Score	OT	Decision	Arena	Attendance	Record	Pts	Recap
11	November 1	@ Columbus Blue Jackets	4–3	SO	Huet	Nationwide Arena	14,680	5–3–3	13	W2
12	November 3	Colorado Avalanche	6–2		Khabibulin	United Center	21,142	6–3–3	15	W3
13	November 9	Calgary Flames	6–1		Huet	United Center	21,169	7–3–3	17	W4
14	November 12	Boston Bruins	2–1	SO	Khabibulin	United Center	22,092	7–3–4	18	SOL1
15	November 14	St. Louis Blues	4–3	OT	Khabibulin	United Center	22,260	7–3–5	19	OTL2
16	November 16	San Jose Sharks	6–5		Huet	United Center	21,181	7–4–5	19	L1
17	November 18	@ Phoenix Coyotes	3–2	SO	Khabibulin	Jobing.com Arena	14,682	8–4–5	21	W1
18	November 20	@ Dallas Stars	6–3		Khabibulin	American Airlines Center	18,027	9–4–5	23	W2
19	November 22	@ Toronto Maple Leafs	5–4	OT	Khabibulin	Air Canada Centre	19,474	10–4–5	25	W3
20	November 26	@ San Jose Sharks	3–2	OT	Huet	HP Pavilion at San Jose	17,496	10–4–6	26	OTL1
21	November 28	@ Anaheim Ducks	1–0		Huet	Honda Center	16,994	10–5–6	26	L1
22	November 29	@ Los Angeles Kings	5–2		Huet	Staples Center	16,147	10–6–6	26	L2

December: 10–1–1 (Home: 5–0–0; Road: 5–1–1) Pts. 21
#	Date	Opponent	Score	OT	Decision	Arena	Attendance	Record	Pts	Recap
23	December 3	Anaheim Ducks	4–2		Huet	United Center	21,574	11–6–6	28	W1
24	December 6	@ Detroit Red Wings	5–4	SO	Huet	Joe Louis Arena	20,066	11–6–7	29	SOL1
25	December 7	Phoenix Coyotes	7–1		Huet	United Center	21,217	12–6–7	31	W1
26	December 10	Ottawa Senators	2–0		Huet	United Center	21,614	13–6–7	33	W2
27	December 12	@ Colorado Avalanche	4–3		Khabibulin	Pepsi Center	17,569	14–6–7	35	W3
28	December 14	Columbus Blue Jackets	3–1		Huet	United Center	21,379	15–6–7	37	W4
29	December 16	@ Edmonton Oilers	9–2		Khabibulin	Rexall Place	16,839	16–6–7	39	W5
30	December 19	@ Calgary Flames	3–2	OT	Khabibulin	Pengrowth Saddledome	19,289	17–6–7	41	W6
31	December 20	@ Vancouver Canucks	3–1		Huet	General Motors Place	18,630	18–6–7	43	W7
32	December 26	Philadelphia Flyers	5–1		Khabibulin	United Center	22,712	19–6–7	45	W8
33	December 28	@ Minnesota Wild	4–1		Huet	Xcel Energy Center	18,568	20–6–7	47	W9
34	December 30	@ Detroit Red Wings	4–0		Khabibulin	Joe Louis Arena	20,066	20–7–7	47	L1

January: 7–6–1 (Home: 3–3–1; Road: 4–3–0)
#	Date	Opponent	Score	OT	Decision	Arena	Attendance	Record	Pts	Recap
35	January 1*	Detroit Red Wings	6–4		Huet	Wrigley Field	40,818	20–8–7	47	L2
36	January 4	Calgary Flames	5–2		Khabibulin	United Center	22,146	21–8–7	49	W1
37	January 6	@ Phoenix Coyotes	6–0		Huet	Jobing.com Arena	14,651	22–8–7	51	W2
38	January 8	@ Colorado Avalanche	2–1		Khabibulin	Pepsi Center	15,174	22–9–7	51	L1
39	January 10	@ Nashville Predators	4–1		Huet	Sommet Center	16,802	22–10–7	51	L2
40	January 11	Nashville Predators	3–1		Khabibulin	United Center	21,666	23–10–7	53	W1
41	January 14	Buffalo Sabres	4–1		Huet	United Center	21,684	24–10–7	55	W2
42	January 16	New York Rangers	3–2	OT	Khabibulin	United Center	22,624	24–10–8	56	OTL1
43	January 17	@ St. Louis Blues	2–1	OT	Huet	Scottrade Center	19,250	25–10–8	58	W1
44	January 19	Minnesota Wild	4–1		Khabibulin	United Center	21,320	25–11–8	58	L1
45	January 21	St. Louis Blues	2–0		Huet	United Center	22,299	25–12–8	58	L2
46	January 28	@ Anaheim Ducks	3–2		Khabibulin	Honda Center	17,193	26–12–8	60	W1
47	January 29	@ Los Angeles Kings	5–2		Huet	Staples Center	18,118	26–13–8	60	L1
48	January 31	@ San Jose Sharks	4–2		Khabibulin	HP Pavilion at San Jose	17,496	27–13–8	62	W1
*2009 NHL Winter Classic

February: 7–4–1 (Home: 1–1–1; Road: 6–3–0)
#	Date	Opponent	Score	OT	Decision	Arena	Attendance	Record	Pts	Recap
49	February 3	@ Edmonton Oilers	3–1		Huet	Rexall Place	16,839	28–13–8	64	W2
50	February 5	@ Calgary Flames	5–2		Khabibulin	Pengrowth Saddledome	19,289	29–13–8	66	W3
51	February 7	@ Vancouver Canucks	7–3		Khabibulin	General Motors Place	18,630	29–14–8	66	L1
52	February 11	@ Atlanta Thrashers	3–1		Khabibulin	Philips Arena	14,029	30–14–8	68	W1
53	February 13	@ St. Louis Blues	1–0		Huet	Scottrade Center	19,150	30–15–8	68	L1
54	February 14	Dallas Stars	6–2		Huet	United Center	22,704	31–15–8	70	W1
55	February 17	@ Tampa Bay Lightning	5–3		Huet	St. Pete Times Forum	15,431	32–15–8	72	W2
56	February 19	@ Florida Panthers	4–0		Huet	BankAtlantic Center	16,133	33–15–8	74	W3
57	February 21	@ Dallas Stars	3–1		Huet	American Airlines Center	18,584	34–15–8	76	W4
58	February 22	Minnesota Wild	2–1		Huet	United Center	22,443	34–16–8	76	L1
59	February 24	@ Nashville Predators	5–3		Huet	Sommet Center	15,075	34–17–8	76	L2
60	February 27	Pittsburgh Penguins	5–4	OT	Niemi	United Center	22,689	34–17–9	77	OTL1

March: 6–7–2 (Home: 6–4–1; Road: 0–3–1)
#	Date	Opponent	Score	OT	Decision	Arena	Attendance	Record	Pts	Recap
61	March 1	Los Angeles Kings	4–2		Niemi	United Center	21,386	35–17–9	79	W1
62	March 3	Anaheim Ducks	3–2	OT	Huet	United Center	21,619	36–17–9	81	W2
63	March 7	@ Boston Bruins	5–3		Huet	TD Banknorth Garden	17,565	36–18–9	81	L1
64	March 8	Colorado Avalanche	5–1		Niemi	United Center	22,121	36–19–9	81	L2
65	March 11	Carolina Hurricanes	3–2	SO	Huet	United Center	21,513	37–19–9	83	W1
66	March 13	Columbus Blue Jackets	5–3		Huet	United Center	22,176	37–20–9	83	L1
67	March 15	New York Islanders	4–2		Khabibulin	United Center	22,140	37–21–9	83	L2
68	March 17	@ New Jersey Devils	3–2		Khabibulin	Prudential Center	17,625	37–22–9	83	L3
69	March 18	@ Columbus Blue Jackets	4–3	OT	Huet	Nationwide Arena	15,190	37–22–10	84	OTL1
70	March 20	Edmonton Oilers	5–4	SO	Khabibulin	United Center	22,151	37–22–11	85	SOL2
71	March 22	Los Angeles Kings	4–1		Khabibulin	United Center	21,629	38–22–11	87	W1
72	March 25	San Jose Sharks	6–5	SO	Khabibulin	United Center	21,812	39–22–11	89	W2
73	March 27	New Jersey Devils	3–2	OT	Khabibulin	United Center	21,617	40–22–11	91	W3
74	March 29	Vancouver Canucks	4–0		Khabibulin	United Center	21,673	40–23–11	91	L1
75	March 31	@ Montreal Canadiens	4–1		Huet	Bell Centre	21,273	40–24–11	91	L2

April: 6–0–1 (Home: 3–0–1; Road: 3–0–0)
#	Date	Opponent	Score	OT	Decision	Arena	Attendance	Record	Pts	Recap
76	April 1	St. Louis Blues	3–1		Khabibulin	United Center	21,548	41–24–11	93	W1
77	April 3	Nashville Predators	3–1		Khabibulin	United Center	21,628	42–24–11	95	W2
78	April 5	@ Columbus Blue Jackets	1–0	OT	Khabibulin	Nationwide Arena	15,957	43–24–11	97	W3
79	April 7	@ Nashville Predators	4–2		Khabibulin	Sommet Center	17,113	44–24–11	99	W4
80	April 8	Columbus Blue Jackets	4–3	SO	Khabibulin	United Center	21,536	44–24–12	100	SOL1
81	April 11	@ Detroit Red Wings	4–2		Huet	Joe Louis Arena	20,066	45–24–12	102	W1
82	April 12	Detroit Red Wings	3–0		Khabibulin	United Center	22,376	46–24–12	104	W2

== Playoffs ==
- For the first time since 2002, the Blackhawks qualify for the Stanley Cup Playoffs.
- For the first time since 1996, the Blackhawks advanced to the Stanley Cup Semi-final.
- For the first time since 1995 the Blackhawks advanced to the conference finals.

2009 Stanley Cup Playoffs

Western Conference Quarterfinals vs. Calgary Flames (5) – Blackhawks won series 4–2
Game	Date	Opponent	Score	OT	Decision	Arena	Attendance	Series	Recap
1	April 16	Calgary Flames	3–2	0:12 OT	Khabibulin	United Center	22,478	1–0	W1
2	April 18	Calgary Flames	3–2		Khabibulin	United Center	22,514	2–0	W2
3	April 20	@ Calgary Flames	4–2		Khabibulin	Pengrowth Saddledome	19,289	2–1	L1
4	April 22	@ Calgary Flames	6–4		Khabibulin	Pengrowth Saddledome	19,289	2–2	L2
5	April 25	Calgary Flames	5–1		Khabibulin	United Center	22,563	3–2	W1
6	April 27	@ Calgary Flames	4–1		Khabibulin	Pengrowth Saddledome	19,289	4–2	W2

Western Conference Semifinals vs. Vancouver Canucks (3) – Blackhawks won series 4–2
Game	Date	Opponent	Score	OT	Decision	Arena	Attendance	Series	Recap
1	April 30	@ Vancouver Canucks	5–3		Khabibulin	General Motors Place	18,630	0–1	L1
2	May 2	@ Vancouver Canucks	6–3		Khabibulin	General Motors Place	18,630	1–1	W1
3	May 5	Vancouver Canucks	3–1		Khabibulin	United Center	22,659	1–2	L1
4	May 7	Vancouver Canucks	2–1	02:52 OT	Khabibulin	United Center	22,682	2–2	W1
5	May 9	@ Vancouver Canucks	4–2		Khabibulin	General Motors Place	18,630	3–2	W2
6	May 11	Vancouver Canucks	7–5		Khabibulin	United Center	22,687	4–2	W3

Western Conference Finals vs. Detroit Red Wings (2) – Blackhawks lost series 4–1
Game	Date	Opponent	Score	OT	Decision	Arena	Attendance	Series	Recap
1	May 17	@ Detroit Red Wings	5–2		Khabibulin	Joe Louis Arena	20,066	0–1	L1
2	May 19	@ Detroit Red Wings	3–2	05:14 OT	Khabibulin	Joe Louis Arena	20,066	0–2	L2
3	May 22	Detroit Red Wings	4–3	18:08 OT	Huet	United Center	22,678	1–2	W1
4	May 24	Detroit Red Wings	6–1		Huet	United Center	22,663	1–3	L1
5	May 27	@ Detroit Red Wings	2–1	03:58 OT	Huet	Joe Louis Arena	20,066	1–4	L2

Legend: Win Loss

== Player statistics ==
=== Skaters ===
Note: Pos = Position; GP = Games played; G = Goals; A = Assists; Pts = Points; PIM = Penalty minutes; +/- = Plus/minus; PPG = Power-play goals; SHG = Short-handed goals; GWG = Game-winning goals

Regular season

Player	GP	G	A	Pts	+/−	PIM
Martin Havlat	81	29	48	77	+29	30
Patrick Kane	80	25	45	70	−2	42
Jonathan Toews	82	34	35	69	+12	51
Kris Versteeg	78	22	31	53	+15	55
Brian Campbell	82	7	45	52	+5	22
Andrew Ladd	82	15	34	49	+26	28
Dave Bolland	81	19	28	47	+19	52
Patrick Sharp	61	26	18	44	+6	41
Duncan Keith	77	8	36	44	+33	60
Cam Barker	68	6	34	40	−6	65
Dustin Byfuglien	77	15	16	31	+7	81
Brent Seabrook	82	8	18	26	+23	62
Troy Brouwer	69	10	16	26	+7	50
Colin Fraser	81	6	11	17	+3	55
Ben Eager	75	11	4	15	+1	161
Matt Walker	65	1	13	14	+7	79
James Wisniewski^{‡}	31	2	11	13	+6	14
Adam Burish	66	6	3	9	+3	93
Aaron Johnson	38	3	5	8	+19	33
Craig Adams^{‡}	36	2	4	6	−3	22
Samuel Pahlsson^{†}	13	2	1	3	−1	2
Niklas Hjalmarsson	21	1	2	3	+4	0
Brent Sopel	23	1	1	2	−4	8
Nikolai Khabibulin (G)	42	0	2	2	n/a	8
Jack Skille	8	1	0	1	−3	5
Cristobal Huet (G)	41	0	0	0	n/a	2
Tim Brent	2	0	0	0	0	2
Jordan Hendry	9	0	0	0	−1	4
Pascal Pelletier	7	0	0	0	−4	0
Antti Niemi (G)	3	0	0	0	n/a	0
Jacob Dowell	1	0	0	0	+1	2

Playoffs

Player	GP	G	A	Pts	+/−	PIM
Martin Havlat	16	5	10	15	0	8
Patrick Kane	16	9	5	14	−9	12
Jonathan Toews	17	7	6	13	−1	26
Brent Seabrook	17	1	11	12	0	14
Dave Bolland	17	4	8	12	−1	24
Kris Versteeg	17	4	8	12	−5	22
Patrick Sharp	17	7	4	11	−1	6
Brian Campbell	17	2	8	10	0	0
Dustin Byfuglien	17	3	6	9	−2	26
Cam Barker	17	3	6	9	−3	2
Duncan Keith	17	0	6	6	+1	10
Samuel Pahlsson	17	2	3	5	−4	4
Adam Burish	17	3	2	5	+3	30
Andrew Ladd	17	3	1	4	+3	12
Matt Walker	17	0	2	2	−4	14
Ben Eager	17	1	1	2	−1	61
Troy Brouwer	17	0	2	2	−1	12
Niklas Hjalmarsson	17	0	1	1	−2	6
Colin Fraser	2	0	0	0	0	2

=== Goaltenders ===
Note: Pos = Position;GP = Games played; Min, TOI = Minutes played; W = Wins; L = Losses; T,T/OT = Ties; OTL = Overtime losses; GA = Goals-against; GAA = Goals-against average; SO = Shutouts; SA = Shots against; SV = Shots saved; SV% = Save percentage;

Regular season

Player	GP	Min	W	L	OT	GA	GAA	SA	SV	Sv%	SO
Nikolai Khabibulin	42	2467	25	8	7	96	2.33	1192	1096	.919	3
Cristobal Huet	41	2351	20	15	4	99	2.53	1087	998	.909	3
Antti Niemi	3	141	1	1	1	8	3.40	59	51	.864	0
Combined			46	24	12	203	2.46	1554	1429	.917	6

Playoffs

Player	GP	Min	W	L	GA	GAA	SA	SV	Sv%	SO
Nikolai Khabibulin	15	880	8	6	43	2.93	421	378	.898	0
Cristobal Huet	3	129	1	2	7	3.23	78	71	.910	0
Corey Crawford	1	15	0	0	1	3.77	7	6	.857	0

^{†}Denotes player spent time with another team before joining Blackhawks. Stats reflect time with the Blackhawks only.
^{‡}Traded mid-season
Bold/italics denotes franchise record

== Awards and records ==
=== Milestones ===
Regular season
Player	Milestone	Reached
Colin Fraser	1st NHL goal 1st NHL point	October 15, 2008
Brent Sopel	500th game	October 27, 2008

== Transactions ==
=== Trades ===
July 1, 2008	To Chicago Blackhawks Conditional 2nd-round pick in 2009 or 2010 – Bradley Ross	To Calgary Flames Rene Bourque
July 17, 2008	To Chicago Blackhawks Tim Brent	To Pittsburgh Penguins Danny Richmond
July 24, 2008	To Chicago Blackhawks Pascal Pelletier	To Boston Bruins Martin St. Pierre
September 12, 2008	To Chicago Blackhawks 2nd-round pick in 2010	To Montreal Canadiens Robert Lang
October 2, 2008	To Dallas Stars Doug Janik	To Chicago Blackhawks Claimed off waivers
October 3, 2008	To Chicago Blackhawks Joakim Lindstrom	To Anaheim Ducks Claimed off waivers
October 7, 2008	To Anaheim Ducks Joakim Lindstrom	To Chicago Blackhawks Claimed off waivers
October 8, 2008	To Chicago Blackhawks Doug Janik	To Dallas Stars Claimed off waivers
October 8, 2008	To Chicago Blackhawks Conditional 7th-round pick in 2010	To Dallas Stars Doug Janik
December 9, 2008	To Chicago Blackhawks Jimmy Sharrow	To Vancouver Canucks Conditional 7th-round pick
January 10, 2009	To Chicago Blackhawks Adam Pineault	To Columbus Blue Jackets Mike Blunden
March 4, 2009	To Chicago Blackhawks Samuel Pahlsson; Logan Stephenson; Conditional 4th-round pick	To Anaheim Ducks James Wisniewski; Petri Kontiola

=== Free agents ===
Player	Former team	Contract terms
Brian Campbell	San Jose Sharks	8 years, $56.8 million
Cristobal Huet	Washington Capitals	4 year, $22.5 million
Matt Walker	St. Louis Blues	1 year, $600,000
Aaron Johnson	New York Islanders	1 year, $525,000
Doug Janik	Tampa Bay Lightning	1 year, $500,000

Player	New team
David Koci	Tampa Bay Lightning
Patrick Lalime	Buffalo Sabres
Jason Williams	Atlanta Thrashers

== Draft picks ==
The 2008 NHL entry draft was hosted at Scotiabank Place in Ottawa, Ontario, on June 20–21, 2008. With the 11th pick in the first round, the Blackhawks selected Kyle Beach from the Everett Silvertips of the Western Hockey League (WHL). The Blackhawks drafted seven players (five defensemen and two forwards) in five of the seven rounds. All of the prospects were returned to their junior or professional league by the end of training camp.

Round	#	Player	Position	Nationality	College/junior/club team (league)
1	11	Kyle Beach	(LW)	Canada	Everett Silvertips (WHL)
3	68 (from Toronto via NY Islanders)	Shawn Lalonde	(D)	Canada	Belleville Bulls (OHL)
5	132	Teigan Zahn	(D)	Canada	Saskatoon Blades (WHL)
6	162	Jonathan Carlsson	(D)	Sweden	Brynas IF (Elitserien)
6	169 (from Ottawa)	Ben Smith	(RW)	United States	Boston College (Hockey East)
6	179 (from Dallas via Los Angeles)	Braden Birch	(D)	Canada	Oakville Blades (OPJHL)
7	192	Joe Gleason	(D)	United States	Edina High School (USHS-MN)

== See also ==
- 2008–09 NHL season
