= 2008–09 Detroit Red Wings season =

2008–09 Detroit Red Wings
- Western Conference champions
- Central Division champions
- Division: 1st Central
- Conference: 2nd Western
- 2008–09 record: 51–21–10
- Home record: 27–9–5
- Road record: 24–12–5
- Goals for: 297
- Goals against: 244

Team information
- General manager: Ken Holland
- Coach: Mike Babcock
- Captain: Nicklas Lidström
- Alternate captains: Pavel Datsyuk; Kris Draper; Henrik Zetterberg
- Arena: Joe Louis Arena
- Average attendance: 19,865; Capacity: 20,066 (99.0%); Total: 814,474

Team leaders
- Goals: Marián Hossa (40)
- Assists: Pavel Datsyuk (65)
- Points: Pavel Datsyuk (97)
- Penalty minutes: Andreas Lilja (66)
- Plus/minus: Pavel Datsyuk (34)
- Wins: Chris Osgood (26)
- Goals against average: Ty Conklin (2.51)

The 2008–09 Detroit Red Wings season was the 83rd season for the National Hockey League (NHL) franchise that was established on September 25, 1926. The Detroit Red Wings entered the season as the defending Stanley Cup champions, winning the 2008 Stanley Cup Final against the Pittsburgh Penguins in six games. The Red Wings signed free agent and former Penguin Marián Hossa on July 2nd to a one-year contract with the team, after he turned down a long term offer from the Penguins as he felt Detroit offered him his best chance to win the Cup. They also signed free agent and former Penguins backup goaltender Ty Conklin to backup veteran starting goaltender Chris Osgood for the season after Dominik Hašek retired from the NHL after the Cup win. With the elimination of the MLB's New York Yankees from the playoffs for the first time since 1993, the Red Wings owned the longest active playoff streak in North American sports, qualifying every year since 1991.

They won 51 games during the regular season, their fourth consecutive season of 50 or more victories. The team made it back to the Stanley Cup Final, also against the team they defeated the year prior, the Penguins, but with a different outcome as the Penguins beat the Red Wings in seven games.

== Off-season ==
June 9: Dominik Hašek announced his retirement from the NHL.

June 10: Detroit signed head coach Mike Babcock to three-year contract extension.

June 11: Assistant coach Todd McLellan signed with the San Jose Sharks as their new head coach.

June 30: The Detroit Red Wings re-signed defenseman Andreas Lilja to a two-year contract.

July 1: Brad Stuart re-signed with the Detroit Red Wings. It is a four-year deal worth $3.75 million per season, and a no-trade clause for the first two.

July 2: Marián Hossa signed a one-year, $7.45 million contract.

July 15: Dallas Drake announced his retirement from the NHL.

July 23: Ryan Oulahen re-signed with the Detroit Red Wings with a one-year deal.

July 30: Valtteri Filppula re-signed on a five-year, $15 million contract.

== Regular season ==
Excluding six shootout-winning goals, the Red Wings scored 289 goals during the regular season, the most of all 30 teams in the NHL. They also scored the most power-play goals, with 90, and had the best power-play percentage, at 25.50% (90 for 353).

=== Divisional standings ===
Central Division
| | | GP | W | L | OTL | GF | GA | Pts |
|---|---|---|---|---|---|---|---|---|
| **1** | **y – Detroit Red Wings** | **82** | **51** | **21** | **10** | **295** | **244** | **112** |
| **2** | **Chicago Blackhawks** | **82** | **46** | **24** | **12** | **264** | **216** | **104** |
| **3** | **St. Louis Blues** | **82** | **41** | **31** | **10** | **233** | **233** | **92** |
| **4** | **Columbus Blue Jackets** | **82** | **41** | **31** | **10** | **226** | **230** | **92** |
| 5 | Nashville Predators | 82 | 40 | 34 | 8 | 213 | 233 | 88 |

=== Conference standings ===
Western Conference
| R | | Div | GP | W | L | OTL | GF | GA | Pts |
|---|---|---|---|---|---|---|---|---|---|
| **1** | **p – San Jose Sharks** | **PA** | **82** | **53** | **18** | **11** | **257** | **204** | 117 |
| **2** | **y – Detroit Red Wings** | **CE** | **82** | **51** | **21** | **10** | **295** | **244** | 112 |
| **3** | **y – Vancouver Canucks** | **NW** | **82** | **45** | **27** | **10** | **246** | **220** | 100 |
| **4** | **Chicago Blackhawks** | **CE** | **82** | **46** | **24** | **12** | **264** | **216** | 104 |
| **5** | **Calgary Flames** | **NW** | **82** | **46** | **30** | **6** | **254** | **248** | 98 |
| **6** | **St. Louis Blues** | **CE** | **82** | **41** | **31** | **10** | **233** | **233** | 92 |
| **7** | **Columbus Blue Jackets** | **CE** | **82** | **41** | **31** | **10** | **226** | **230** | 92 |
| **8** | **Anaheim Ducks** | **PA** | **82** | **42** | **33** | **7** | **245** | **238** | 91 |
8.5
| 9 | Minnesota Wild | NW | 82 | 40 | 33 | 9 | 219 | 200 | 89 |
| 10 | Nashville Predators | CE | 82 | 40 | 34 | 8 | 213 | 233 | 88 |
| 11 | Edmonton Oilers | NW | 82 | 38 | 35 | 9 | 234 | 248 | 85 |
| 12 | Dallas Stars | PA | 82 | 36 | 35 | 11 | 230 | 257 | 83 |
| 13 | Phoenix Coyotes | PA | 82 | 36 | 39 | 7 | 208 | 252 | 79 |
| 14 | Los Angeles Kings | PA | 82 | 34 | 37 | 11 | 207 | 234 | 79 |
| 15 | Colorado Avalanche | NW | 82 | 32 | 45 | 5 | 199 | 257 | 69 |

bold – qualified for playoffs, y – division winner, p – Presidents' Trophy winner
CE – Central Division, NW – Northwest Division, PA – Pacific Division

== Schedule and results ==
2008–09 Game Log
Preseason: 6–1–2 (Home: 3–1–1; Road: 3–0–1)

| # | Date | Visitor | Score | Home | OT | Decision | Attendance | Record |
|---|---|---|---|---|---|---|---|---|
| 1 | September 24 | Montreal | 3 – 2 | Detroit | SO | Howard | 15,319 | 0–0–1 |
| 2 | September 25 | Detroit | 4 – 3 | Boston | | Larsson | | 1–0–1 |
| 3 | September 26 | Boston | 2 – 1 | Detroit | | Conklin | 15,266 | 1–1–1 |
| 4 | September 28 | Atlanta | 0 – 4 | Detroit | | Osgood | 17,714 | 2–1–1 |
| 5 | September 30 | Detroit | 1 – 2 | Montreal | SO | Howard | 21,273 | 2–1–2 |
| 6 | October 1 | Detroit | 4 – 1 | Atlanta | | Osgood | 10,817 | 3–1–2 |
| 7 | October 3 | Toronto | 3 – 5 | Detroit | | Conklin | 17,913 | 4–1–2 |
| 8 | October 4 | Detroit | 4 – 3 | Toronto | | Osgood | 18,878 | 5–1–2 |
| 9 | October 5 | Buffalo | 0 – 3 | Detroit | | Conklin | 15,983 | 6–1–2 |

October: 7–2–2 (Home: 2–1–1; Road: 5–1–1)

| # | Date | Visitor | Score | Home | OT | Decision | Attendance | Record | Pts |
|---|---|---|---|---|---|---|---|---|---|
| 1 | October 9 | Toronto | 3 – 2 | Detroit | | Osgood | 20,066 | 0–1–0 | 0 |
| 2 | October 11 | Detroit | 3 – 2 | Ottawa | | Osgood | 20,182 | 1–1–0 | 2 |
| 3 | October 13 | Detroit | 3 – 1 | Carolina | | Conklin | 18,680 | 2–1–0 | 4 |
| 4 | October 16 | Vancouver | 4 – 3 | Detroit | OT | Osgood | 19,011 | 2–1–1 | 5 |
| 5 | October 18 | NY Rangers | 4 – 5 | Detroit | OT | Osgood | 20,066 | 3–1–1 | 7 |
| 6 | October 22 | Detroit | 4 – 3 | St. Louis | | Conklin | 19,150 | 4–1–1 | 9 |
| 7 | October 24 | Atlanta | 3 - 5 | Detroit | | Osgood | 20,066 | 5–1–1 | 11 |
| 8 | October 25 | Detroit | 6 – 5 | Chicago | SO | Conklin | 22,690 | 6–1–1 | 13 |
| 9 | October 27 | Detroit | 4 – 3 | Los Angeles | SO | Osgood | 17,671 | 7–1–1 | 15 |
| 10 | October 29 | Detroit | 4 – 5 | Anaheim | OT | Osgood | 17,174 | 7–1–2 | 16 |
| 11 | October 30 | Detroit | 2 – 4 | San Jose | | Conklin | 17,496 | 7–2–2 | 16 |

November: 8–2–2 (Home: 3–1–1; Road: 5–1–1)

| # | Date | Visitor | Score | Home | OT | Decision | Attendance | Record | Pts |
|---|---|---|---|---|---|---|---|---|---|
| 12 | November 2 | Detroit | 3 – 2 | Vancouver | | Osgood | 18,630 | 8–2–2 | 18 |
| 13 | November 8 | New Jersey | 1 – 3 | Detroit | | Osgood | 20,066 | 9–2–2 | 20 |
| 14 | November 11 | Pittsburgh | 7 – 6 | Detroit | OT | Osgood | 20,066 | 9–2–3 | 21 |
| 15 | November 13 | Detroit | 4 – 3 | Tampa Bay | | Osgood | 20,544 | 10–2–3 | 23 |
| 16 | November 14 | Detroit | 3 – 2 | Florida | | Conklin | 18,637 | 11–2–3 | 25 |
| 17 | November 17 | Edmonton | 0 – 4 | Detroit | | Conklin | 18,934 | 12–2–3 | 27 |
| 18 | November 20 | Detroit | 4 – 3 | Edmonton | | Osgood | 16,839 | 13–2–3 | 29 |
| 19 | November 22 | Detroit | 5 – 2 | Calgary | | Conklin | 19,289 | 14–2–3 | 31 |
| 20 | November 24 | Detroit | 2 – 3 | Vancouver | OT | Osgood | 18,630 | 14–2–4 | 32 |
| 21 | November 26 | Montreal | 3 – 1 | Detroit | | Conklin | 20,066 | 14–3–4 | 32 |
| 22 | November 28 | Columbus | 3 – 5 | Detroit | | Osgood | 20,066 | 15–3–4 | 34 |
| 23 | November 29 | Detroit | 1 – 3 | Boston | | Conklin | 17,565 | 15–4–4 | 34 |

December: 9–3–1 (Home: 8–1–0; Road: 1–2–1)

| # | Date | Visitor | Score | Home | OT | Decision | Attendance | Record | Pts |
|---|---|---|---|---|---|---|---|---|---|
| 24 | December 1 | Anaheim | 1 – 2 | Detroit | | Osgood | 18,862 | 16–4–4 | 36 |
| 25 | December 4 | Vancouver | 5 – 6 | Detroit | | Osgood | 19,116 | 17–4–4 | 38 |
| 26 | December 6 | Chicago | 4 – 5 | Detroit | SO | Conklin | 20,066 | 18–4–4 | 40 |
| 27 | December 10 | Calgary | 3 - 4 | Detroit | OT | Conklin | 19,335 | 19–4–4 | 42 |
| 28 | December 12 | Detroit | 1 – 3 | Dallas | | Conklin | 18,532 | 19–5–4 | 42 |
| 29 | December 13 | Detroit | 5 – 4 | Phoenix | SO | Osgood | 16,339 | 20–5–4 | 44 |
| 30 | December 15 | Colorado | 3 – 2 | Detroit | | Osgood | 19,154 | 20–6–4 | 44 |
| 31 | December 18 | San Jose | 0 – 6 | Detroit | | Conklin | 19,507 | 21–6–4 | 46 |
| 32 | December 20 | Los Angeles | 4 – 6 | Detroit | | Conklin | 19,784 | 22–6–4 | 48 |
| 33 | December 23 | St. Louis | 1 – 4 | Detroit | | Conklin | 20,066 | 23–6–4 | 50 |
| 34 | December 26 | Detroit | 2 – 3 | Nashville | | Conklin | 17,113 | 23–7–4 | 50 |
| 35 | December 27 | Detroit | 3 – 4 | Colorado | SO | Conklin | 18,007 | 23–7–5 | 51 |
| 36 | December 30 | Chicago | 0 – 4 | Detroit | | Conklin | 20,066 | 24–7–5 | 53 |

January: 7–4–2 (Home: 3–1–0; Road: 4–3–2)

| # | Date | Visitor | Score | Home | OT | Decision | Attendance | Record | Pts |
|---|---|---|---|---|---|---|---|---|---|
| 37 | January 1 | Detroit | 6 – 4 | Chicago | | Conklin | 40,818 | 25–7–5 | 55 |
| 38 | January 3 | Detroit | 3 – 2 | Minnesota | SO | Osgood | 18,568 | 26–7–5 | 57 |
| 39 | January 6 | Columbus | 0 – 3 | Detroit | | Conklin | 19,717 | 27–7–5 | 59 |
| 40 | January 8 | Dallas | 1 – 6 | Detroit | | Osgood | 20,066 | 28–7–5 | 61 |
| 41 | January 10 | Buffalo | 1 – 3 | Detroit | | Conklin | 20,066 | 29–7–5 | 63 |
| 42 | January 12 | Detroit | 4 – 5 | Dallas | OT | Osgood | 17,648 | 29–7–6 | 64 |
| 43 | January 14 | Detroit | 4 – 3 | Anaheim | | Osgood | 17,525 | 30–7–6 | 66 |
| 44 | January 15 | Detroit | 4 – 0 | Los Angeles | | Conklin | 18,118 | 31–7–6 | 68 |
| 45 | January 17 | Detroit | 5 – 6 | San Jose | | Osgood | 17,496 | 31–8–6 | 68 |
| 46 | January 20 | Detroit | 3 – 6 | Phoenix | | Conklin | 16,368 | 31–9–6 | 68 |
| 47 | January 27 | Detroit | 2 – 3 | Columbus | OT | Osgood | 16,348 | 31–9–7 | 69 |
| 48 | January 29 | Dallas | 2 – 4 | Detroit | | Osgood | 20,066 | 31–10–7 | 69 |
| 49 | January 31 | Detroit | 2 – 4 | Washington | | Conklin | 18,277 | 31–11–7 | 69 |
|^12009 NHL Winter Classic, played at Wrigley Field.

February: 10–3–1 (Home: 8–0–1; Road: 2–3–0)

| # | Date | Visitor | Score | Home | OT | Decision | Attendance | Record | Pts |
|---|---|---|---|---|---|---|---|---|---|
| 50 | February 2 | St. Louis | 3 – 4 | Detroit | SO | Osgood | 19,384 | 32–11–7 | 71 |
| 51 | February 4 | Phoenix | 4 – 5 | Detroit | | Osgood | 19,821 | 33–11–7 | 73 |
| 52 | February 7 | Edmonton | 3 – 8 | Detroit | | Conklin | 20,066 | 34–11–7 | 75 |
| 53 | February 8 | Detroit | 3 – 0 | Pittsburgh | | Conklin | 17,132 | 35–11–7 | 77 |
| 54 | February 10 | Detroit | 5 – 3 | Nashville | | Conklin | 15,077 | 36–11–7 | 79 |
| 55 | February 12 | Minnesota | 2 – 4 | Detroit | | Osgood | 20,066 | 37–11–7 | 81 |
| 56 | February 13 | Detroit | 2 – 3 | Columbus | | Osgood | 18,802 | 37–12–7 | 81 |
| 57 | February 15 | Colorado | 6 – 5 | Detroit | SO | Osgood | 20,066 | 37–12–8 | 82 |
| 58 | February 18 | Nashville | 2 – 6 | Detroit | | Conklin | 20,066 | 38–12–8 | 84 |
| 59 | February 20 | Anaheim | 2 – 5 | Detroit | | Conklin | 20,066 | 39–12–8 | 86 |
| 60 | February 21 | Detroit | 2 – 5 | Minnesota | | Howard | 18,568 | 39–13–8 | 86 |
| 61 | February 25 | San Jose | 1 – 4 | Detroit | | Conklin | 20,066 | 40–13–8 | 88 |
| 62 | February 27 | Los Angeles | 1 – 2 | Detroit | | Osgood | 20,066 | 41–13–8 | 90 |
| 63 | February 28 | Detroit | 0 – 8 | Nashville | | Conklin | 17,113 | 41–14–8 | 90 |

March: 8–4–1 (Home: 2–3–1; Road: 6–1–0)

| # | Date | Visitor | Score | Home | OT | Decision | Attendance | Record | Pts |
|---|---|---|---|---|---|---|---|---|---|
| 64 | March 3 | Detroit | 5 – 0 | St. Louis | | Osgood | 19,250 | 42–14–8 | 92 |
| 65 | March 4 | Detroit | 3 – 2 | Colorado | | Conklin | 18,007 | 43–14–8 | 94 |
| 66 | March 7 | Columbus | 8 – 2 | Detroit | | Osgood | 20,066 | 43–15–8 | 94 |
| 67 | March 10 | Phoenix | 2 – 3 | Detroit | OT | Conklin | 20,066 | 44–15–8 | 96 |
| 68 | March 12 | Calgary | 6 – 5 | Detroit | SO | Conklin | 20,066 | 44–15–9 | 97 |
| 69 | March 14 | Detroit | 5 – 2 | St. Louis | | Osgood | 19,250 | 45–15–9 | 99 |
| 70 | March 15 | Detroit | 4 – 0 | Columbus | | Osgood | 18,685 | 46–15–9 | 101 |
| 71 | March 17 | Philadelphia | 2 – 3 | Detroit | | Osgood | 20,066 | 47–15–9 | 103 |
| 72 | March 20 | Detroit | 6 – 3 | Atlanta | | Osgood | 18,545 | 48–15–9 | 105 |
| 73 | March 23 | Detroit | 3 – 5 | Calgary | | Osgood | 19,289 | 48–16–9 | 105 |
| 74 | March 24 | Detroit | 3 – 2 | Edmonton | | Conklin | 16,839 | 49–16–9 | 107 |
| 75 | March 27 | NY Islanders | 2 – 0 | Detroit | | Osgood | 20,066 | 49–17–9 | 107 |
| 76 | March 29 | Nashville | 4 – 3 | Detroit | | Osgood | 20,066 | 49–18–9 | 107 |

April: 2–3–1 (Home: 1–2–1; Road: 1–1–0)

| # | Date | Visitor | Score | Home | OT | Decision | Attendance | Record | Pts |
|---|---|---|---|---|---|---|---|---|---|
| 77 | April 2 | St. Louis | 5 – 4 | Detroit | | Conklin | 19,935 | 49–19–9 | 107 |
| 78 | April 5 | Minnesota | 2 – 3 | Detroit | | Osgood | 20,066 | 50–19–9 | 109 |
| 79 | April 6 | Detroit | 4 – 1 | Buffalo | | Osgood | 18,690 | 51–19–9 | 111 |
| 80 | April 9 | Nashville | 4 – 3 | Detroit | SO | Osgood | 20,066 | 51–19–10 | 112 |
| 81 | April 11 | Chicago | 4 – 2 | Detroit | | Conklin | 20,066 | 51–20–10 | 112 |
| 82 | April 12 | Detroit | 0 – 3 | Chicago | | Osgood | 22,376 | 51–21–10 | 112 |

Legend: Win (2 points)

Loss (0 points) Overtime/shootout loss (1 point)

== Playoffs ==
Detroit had not missed the post-season since 1989–90. The 2008–09 season was their 18th consecutive playoff season.

2009 Stanley Cup playoffs
Western Conference quarter-final vs. (7) Columbus Blue Jackets: Detroit won series 4–0

| # | Date | Visitor | Score | Home | OT | Decision | Attendance | Series |
|---|---|---|---|---|---|---|---|---|
| 1 | April 16 | Columbus | 1 – 4 | Detroit | | Osgood | 20,066 | 1–0 |
| 2 | April 18 | Columbus | 0 – 4 | Detroit | | Osgood | 20,066 | 2–0 |
| 3 | April 21 | Detroit | 4 – 1 | Columbus | | Osgood | 19,219 | 3–0 |
| 4 | April 23 | Detroit | 6 – 5 | Columbus | | Osgood | 18,889 | 4–0 |

Western Conference semi-final vs. (8) Anaheim Ducks: Detroit won series 4–3

| # | Date | Visitor | Score | Home | OT | Decision | Attendance | Series |
|---|---|---|---|---|---|---|---|---|
| 1 | May 1 | Anaheim | 2 – 3 | Detroit | | Osgood | 20,066 | 1–0 |
| 2 | May 3 | Anaheim | 4 – 3 | Detroit | 3OT | Osgood | 20,066 | 1–1 |
| 3 | May 5 | Detroit | 1 – 2 | Anaheim | | Osgood | 17,174 | 1–2 |
| 4 | May 7 | Detroit | 6 – 3 | Anaheim | | Osgood | 17,601 | 2–2 |
| 5 | May 10 | Anaheim | 1 – 4 | Detroit | | Osgood | 20,066 | 3–2 |
| 6 | May 12 | Detroit | 1 – 2 | Anaheim | | Osgood | 17,174 | 3–3 |
| 7 | May 14 | Anaheim | 3 – 4 | Detroit | | Osgood | 20,066 | 4–3 |

Western Conference finals vs. (4) Chicago Blackhawks: Detroit won series 4–1

| # | Date | Visitor | Score | Home | OT | Decision | Attendance | Series |
|---|---|---|---|---|---|---|---|---|
| 1 | May 17 | Chicago | 2 – 5 | Detroit | | Osgood | 20,066 | 1–0 |
| 2 | May 19 | Chicago | 2 – 3 | Detroit | OT | Osgood | 20,066 | 2–0 |
| 3 | May 22 | Detroit | 3 – 4 | Chicago | OT | Osgood | 22,678 | 2–1 |
| 4 | May 24 | Detroit | 6 – 1 | Chicago | | Conklin | 22,663 | 3–1 |
| 5 | May 27 | Chicago | 1 - 2 | Detroit | OT | Osgood | 20,066 | 4-1 |

Stanley Cup Finals vs. (4) Pittsburgh Penguins: Detroit lost series 3–4

| # | Date | Visitor | Score | Home | OT | Decision | Attendance | Series |
|---|---|---|---|---|---|---|---|---|
| 1 | May 30 | Pittsburgh | 1 – 3 | Detroit | | Osgood | 20,066 | 1–0 |
| 2 | May 31 | Pittsburgh | 1 – 3 | Detroit | | Osgood | 20,066 | 2–0 |
| 3 | June 2 | Detroit | 2 – 4 | Pittsburgh | | Osgood | 17,132 | 2–1 |
| 4 | June 4 | Detroit | 2 – 4 | Pittsburgh | | Osgood | 17,132 | 2–2 |
| 5 | June 6 | Pittsburgh | 0 – 5 | Detroit | | Osgood | 20,066 | 3–2 |
| 6 | June 9 | Detroit | 1 – 2 | Pittsburgh | | Osgood | 17,132 | 3–3 |
| 7 | June 12 | Pittsburgh | 2 - 1 | Detroit | | Osgood | 20,066 | 3–4 |

Legend: Win Loss

During the Finals, Head Coach Mike Babcock joined Mike Keenan as the only coaches in NHL history to coach in Game 7 Stanley Cup Finals on two different teams, having been with the Mighty Ducks of Anaheim in 2003. When the Red Wings lost Game 7, Babcock had the unfortunate distinction of becoming the first coach in NHL history to lose a Game 7 Stanley Cup Finals on two different teams, as his Ducks lost to the New Jersey Devils in 2003.

== Player statistics ==
=== Skaters ===
Note: Pos = Position; GP = Games played; G = Goals; A = Assists; Pts = Points; PIM = Penalty minutes; +/- = Plus/minus; PPG = Power-play goals; SHG = Short-handed goals; GWG = Game-winning goals

Regular season

| Player | GP | G | A | Pts | +/− | PIM |
|---|---|---|---|---|---|---|
| Pavel Datsyuk | 81 | 32 | 65 | 97 | +34 | 22 |
| Henrik Zetterberg | 77 | 31 | 42 | 73 | +13 | 36 |
| Marián Hossa | 74 | 40 | 31 | 71 | +27 | 63 |
| Nicklas Lidström | 78 | 16 | 43 | 59 | +31 | 30 |
| Brian Rafalski | 78 | 10 | 49 | 59 | +17 | 20 |
| Johan Franzén | 71 | 34 | 25 | 59 | +21 | 44 |
| Jiří Hudler | 82 | 23 | 34 | 57 | +7 | 16 |
| Niklas Kronwall | 80 | 6 | 45 | 51 | +2 | 50 |
| Daniel Cleary | 74 | 14 | 26 | 40 | 0 | 46 |
| Mikael Samuelsson | 81 | 19 | 21 | 40 | 0 | 50 |
| Valtteri Filppula | 80 | 12 | 28 | 40 | +9 | 42 |
| Tomas Holmström | 53 | 14 | 23 | 37 | +18 | 38 |
| Tomáš Kopecký | 79 | 6 | 13 | 19 | -7 | 46 |
| Kris Draper | 79 | 7 | 10 | 17 | -13 | 40 |
| Brett Lebda | 65 | 6 | 10 | 16 | +9 | 48 |
| Brad Stuart | 67 | 2 | 13 | 15 | -3 | 26 |
| Andreas Lilja | 60 | 2 | 11 | 13 | +13 | 66 |
| Kirk Maltby | 78 | 5 | 6 | 11 | -9 | 28 |
| Ville Leino | 13 | 5 | 4 | 9 | +5 | 6 |
| Derek Meech | 41 | 2 | 5 | 7 | -12 | 12 |
| Jonathan Ericsson | 19 | 1 | 3 | 4 | -1 | 15 |
| Aaron Downey | 4 | 1 | 1 | 2 | 0 | 7 |
| Darren McCarty | 13 | 1 | 0 | 1 | -2 | 25 |
| Darren Helm | 16 | 0 | 1 | 1 | -7 | 4 |
| Chris Chelios | 28 | 0 | 0 | 0 | +1 | 18 |
| Justin Abdelkader | 2 | 0 | 0 | 0 | 0 | 0 |

Playoffs

| Player | GP | G | A | Pts | +/− | PIM |
|---|---|---|---|---|---|---|
| Henrik Zetterberg | 23 | 11 | 13 | 24 | +13 | 13 |
| Johan Franzén | 23 | 12 | 11 | 23 | +8 | 12 |
| Nicklas Lidström | 21 | 4 | 12 | 16 | +11 | 6 |
| Valtteri Filppula | 23 | 3 | 13 | 16 | +8 | 8 |
| Daniel Cleary | 23 | 9 | 6 | 15 | +17 | 12 |
| Marián Hossa | 23 | 6 | 9 | 15 | +5 | 10 |
| Brian Rafalski | 18 | 3 | 9 | 12 | +11 | 11 |
| Jiří Hudler | 23 | 4 | 8 | 12 | +4 | 6 |
| Mikael Samuelsson | 23 | 5 | 5 | 10 | +7 | 6 |
| Brad Stuart | 23 | 3 | 6 | 9 | +5 | 12 |
| Pavel Datsyuk | 16 | 1 | 8 | 9 | +5 | 9 |
| Niklas Kronwall | 23 | 2 | 7 | 9 | +4 | 33 |
| Jonathan Ericsson | 22 | 4 | 4 | 8 | +9 | 25 |
| Tomas Holmstrom | 23 | 2 | 5 | 7 | -2 | 22 |
| Brett Lebda | 23 | 0 | 6 | 6 | +8 | 22 |
| Darren Helm | 23 | 4 | 1 | 5 | +1 | 4 |
| Justin Abdelkader | 10 | 2 | 1 | 3 | +2 | 0 |
| Ville Leino | 7 | 0 | 2 | 2 | +2 | 0 |
| Kris Draper | 8 | 1 | 0 | 1 | 0 | 0 |
| Kirk Maltby | 20 | 0 | 1 | 1 | -1 | 2 |
| Tomáš Kopecký | 8 | 0 | 1 | 1 | 0 | 7 |
| Chris Chelios | 6 | 0 | 0 | 0 | 0 | 2 |
| Derek Meech | 2 | 0 | 0 | 0 | 0 | 0 |

=== Goaltenders ===
Note: GP = Games played; Min = Minutes played; W = Wins; L = Losses; OT = Overtime losses; GA = Goals against; GAA= Goals against average; SA= Shots against; SV= Saves; Sv% = Save percentage; SO= Shutouts

Regular season

| Player | GP | TOI | W | L | OT | GA | GAA | SA | SV | Sv% | SO |
|---|---|---|---|---|---|---|---|---|---|---|---|
| Chris Osgood | 46 | 2662 | 26 | 9 | 8 | 137 | 3.09 | 1208 | 1071 | .887 | 2 |
| Ty Conklin | 40 | 2246 | 25 | 11 | 2 | 94 | 2.51 | 1033 | 939 | .909 | 6 |
| Jimmy Howard | 1 | 58 | 0 | 1 | 0 | 4 | 4.10 | 28 | 24 | .857 | 0 |

Playoffs

| Player | GP | TOI | W | L | GA | GAA | SA | SV | Sv% | SO |
|---|---|---|---|---|---|---|---|---|---|---|
| Chris Osgood | 23 | 1,405 | 15 | 8 | 47 | 2.01 | 637 | 590 | .926 | 2 |
| Ty Conklin | 1 | 19 | 0 | 0 | 0 | 0.00 | 9 | 9 | 1.000 | 0 |

== Awards and records ==
=== Milestones ===
Regular Season
| Team member | Milestone | Reached |
| Andreas Lilja | 400th NHL game | October 11, 2008 |
| Brett Lebda | 200th NHL game | October 11, 2008 |
| Marián Hossa | 300th NHL goal | October 18, 2008 |
| Ken Holland | 500th win as general manager | October 27, 2008 |
| Niklas Kronwall | 200th NHL game | November 26, 2008 |
| Brad Stuart | 600th NHL game | November 28, 2008 |
| Pavel Datsyuk | 300th NHL assist | November 28, 2008 |
| Johan Franzén | 100th NHL point | December 1, 2008 |
| Derek Meech | 1st NHL goal | December 4, 2008 |
| Jiří Hudler | 200th NHL game | December 10, 2008 |
| Mike Babcock | 250th win as coach | December 10, 2008 |
| Jiří Hudler | 100th NHL point | January 1, 2009 |
| Chris Chelios | NHL record for most regular season career wins (880) | January 7, 2009 |
| Valtteri Filppula | 200th NHL game | January 17, 2009 |
| Brian Rafalski | 400th NHL point | January 17, 2009 |
| Henrik Zetterberg | 400th NHL game | January 27, 2009 |
| Ville Leino | 1st NHL goal | January 31, 2009 |
| Kris Draper | 1000th NHL game | February 2, 2009 |
| Pavel Datsyuk | 500th NHL game | February 13, 2009 |
| Mike Babcock | 200th win as coach of the Red Wings | February 18, 2009 |
| Pavel Datsyuk | 500th NHL point | February 25, 2009 |
| Kirk Maltby | 1000th NHL game | February 27, 2009 |
| Chris Osgood | 300th win with the Red Wings | March 14, 2009 |

== Transactions ==
=== Free agents ===
Acquired by Detroit
| Player | Former team | Contract Terms |
|---|---|---|
| Ty Conklin | Pittsburgh Penguins | 1 year; $750,000 |
| Marián Hossa | Pittsburgh Penguins | 1 year; $7.4 million |
| Darren Haydar | Atlanta Thrashers | 1 year |

Leaving Detroit
| Player | New team |
|---|---|
| Garrett Stafford | Dallas Stars |
| Mark Cullen | Vancouver Canucks |
| Carl Corazzini | Edmonton Oilers |

== Draft picks ==
Detroit's selections at the 2008 NHL entry draft in Ottawa, Ontario.

| Round | Overall pick | Player | Position | Nationality | College/Junior/Club team (League) |
|---|---|---|---|---|---|
| 1 | 30 | Tom McCollum | Goaltender | United States | Guelph Storm (OHL) |
| 3 | 91 | Max Nicastro | Defenseman | United States | Chicago Steel (USHL) |
| 4 | 121 | Gustav Nyquist | Center | Sweden | Malmö Redhawks (Sweden Jr.) |
| 5 | 151 | Julien Cayer | Center | Canada | Northwood School (USHS-NY) |
| 6 | 181 | Stephen Johnston | Left wing | Canada | Belleville Bulls (OHL) |
| 7 | 211 | Jesper Samuelsson | Center | Sweden | HC Vita Hästen (Swe-3) |

== Farm teams ==
The Grand Rapids Griffins of the American Hockey League (AHL) remain the minor league affiliate of the Red Wings for the 2008–09 season.

== See also ==
- 2008–09 NHL season
