= Brett Lebda =

American ice hockey player (born 1982)

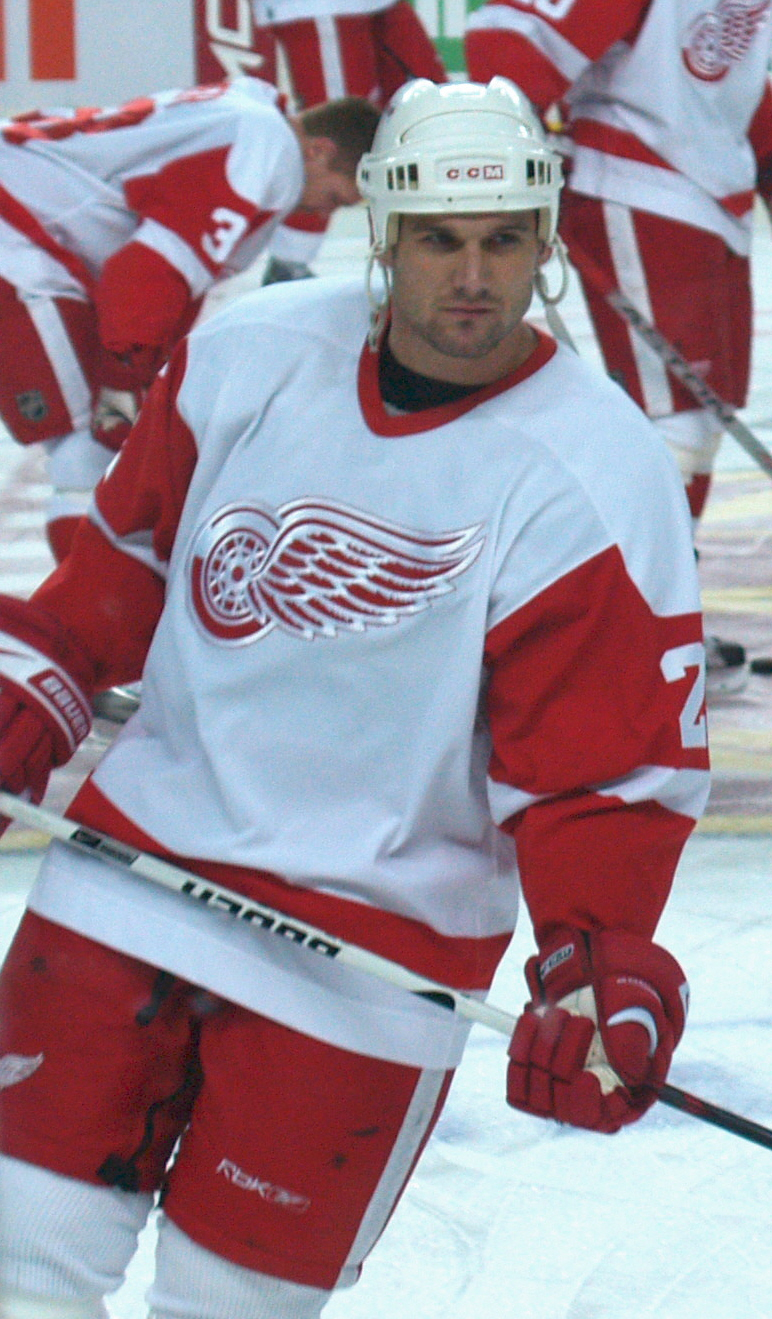
- Born: January 15, 1982 (age 44) Buffalo Grove, Illinois, U.S.
- Height: 5 ft 9 in (175 cm)
- Weight: 195 lb (88 kg; 13 st 13 lb)
- Position: Defense
- Shot: Left
- Played for: Detroit Red Wings; Toronto Maple Leafs; Columbus Blue Jackets
- National team: United States
- NHL draft: Undrafted
- Playing career: 2004–2013

Brett Steven Lebda (born January 15, 1982) is an American former professional ice hockey defenseman, who last played with the Binghamton Senators of the American Hockey League (AHL). He has played in the National Hockey League (NHL) with the Detroit Red Wings, Columbus Blue Jackets and Toronto Maple Leafs.

He was a member of the Stanley Cup winning Red Wings team of 2007-08.

== Playing career ==
As a youth, Lebda played in the 1996 Quebec International Pee-Wee Hockey Tournament with the Chicago Young Americans minor ice hockey team.

Lebda attended Buffalo Grove High School in Buffalo Grove, Illinois for two years. In addition to hockey, he also played golf and volleyball. He then relocated to Ann Arbor, Michigan, where he was a participant on the USA National Under-18 Team. Lebda graduated from Pioneer High School.

Lebda played college hockey at the University of Notre Dame. He was signed as an undrafted free agent by the Detroit Red Wings in 2004, and was assigned to the Grand Rapids Griffins, the Wings' minor league affiliate in the American Hockey League. Lebda was unable to suit up for an NHL game until the 2005–06 NHL season due to the NHL lockout. He became the first Red Wing since Greg Johnson in 1993 to score his first NHL goal on opening night. He played in 46 games that regular season and all of Detroit's six opening round playoff games.

He played in 76 games during the 2006–07 NHL season to go with 12 games that playoff year. He set a career high in points with 18, and participated in the only fight of his career when he squared off against Mikael Holmqvist.

In the 2007–08 NHL season, Lebda suited up for 78 games, as well as 19 playoff games as the Red Wings won the 2008 Stanley Cup.

Due to sub-par play to start the 2008–09 NHL season, Lebda found himself a healthy scratch for three straight games before returning to the lineup.

During his career with the Red Wings, Lebda was often paired with Chris Chelios, a fellow Chicago suburban native who is 20 years his elder. While growing up in suburban Chicago, Lebda considered Chelios an idol, and modeled his game after his.

On July 7, 2010, Lebda signed a two-year contract with the Toronto Maple Leafs. However, he struggled during his time in Toronto, playing only 41 games and posting a career-worst -14. His one and only goal came against the Montreal Canadiens on February 24, 2011.

Lebda and Robert Slaney were traded to the Nashville Predators for Cody Franson and Matthew Lombardi on July 3, 2011. On August 10, 2011, the Predators bought out Lebda's contract.

Following the 2010–11 NHL season Lebda became a free agent, and on November 7, 2011, the Springfield Falcons of the American Hockey League signed Lebda to a professional tryout agreement. With NHL affiliate, the Columbus Blue Jackets, suffering injuries on the defense he was subsequently signed to a one-year deal for the remainder of the season with the Jackets on January 19, 2012.

On February 5, 2013, Lebda signed a professional try-out contract with the Binghamton Senators of the American Hockey League.

== International play ==
Lebda made his international debut for United States at the 2002 World Junior Championships, where he recorded two goals in seven games.

== Career statistics ==
=== Regular season and playoffs ===
			Regular season					Playoffs
Season	Team	League	GP	G	A	Pts	PIM	GP	G	A	Pts	PIM
1998–99	US NTDP Juniors	USHL	3	0	0	0	0	—	—	—	—	—
1998–99	US NTDP U17	USDP	11	1	7	8	4	—	—	—	—	—
1998–99	US NTDP U18	NAHL	52	11	17	28	56	—	—	—	—	—
1999–2000	US NTDP Juniors	USHL	22	6	7	13	28	—	—	—	—	—
1999–2000	US NTDP U18	USDP	4	0	0	0	6	—	—	—	—	—
2000–01	Chicago Steel	USHL	1	0	0	0	0	—	—	—	—	—
2000–01	University of Notre Dame	CCHA	39	7	19	26	109	—	—	—	—	—
2001–02	University of Notre Dame	CCHA	34	6	8	14	54	—	—	—	—	—
2002–03	University of Notre Dame	CCHA	40	7	14	21	48	—	—	—	—	—
2003–04	University of Notre Dame	CCHA	39	6	18	24	42	—	—	—	—	—
2003–04	Grand Rapids Griffins	AHL	6	0	1	1	0	4	0	0	0	2
2004–05	Grand Rapids Griffins	AHL	80	2	10	12	34	—	—	—	—	—
2005–06	Grand Rapids Griffins	AHL	25	4	14	18	42	11	1	4	5	8
2005–06	Detroit Red Wings	NHL	46	3	9	12	20	6	0	0	0	4
2006–07	Detroit Red Wings	NHL	74	5	13	18	61	12	0	2	2	8
2007–08	Detroit Red Wings	NHL	78	3	11	14	48	19	0	2	2	6
2008–09	Detroit Red Wings	NHL	65	6	10	16	48	23	0	6	6	22
2009–10	Detroit Red Wings	NHL	63	1	7	8	24	2	0	0	0	0
2010–11	Toronto Maple Leafs	NHL	41	1	3	4	14	—	—	—	—	—
2011–12	Springfield Falcons	AHL	26	1	9	10	18	—	—	—	—	—
2011–12	Columbus Blue Jackets	NHL	30	1	3	4	14	—	—	—	—	—
2012–13	Rockford IceHogs	AHL	27	0	11	11	18	—	—	—	—	—
2012–13	Binghamton Senators	AHL	32	3	15	18	23	3	0	0	0	12
AHL totals			196	10	60	70	135	18	1	4	5	22
NHL totals			397	20	56	76	229	62	0	10	10	40

=== International ===
Year	Team	Event	Result	GP	G	A	Pts	PIM
2002	United States	WJC	5th	7	2	0	2	6
Junior totals				7	2	0	2	6

== Awards and honors ==
Award	Year
All-CCHA Rookie Team	2000-01
All-CCHA Second Team	2003-04
Stanley Cup (Detroit Red Wings)	2007–08
