= 2008–09 Minnesota Wild season =

National Hockey League team season

2008–09 Minnesota Wild
- Division: 3rd Northwest
- Conference: 9th Western
- 2008–09 record: 40–33–9
- Home record: 23–11–7
- Road record: 17–22–2
- Goals for: 219
- Goals against: 200

Team information
- General manager: Doug Risebrough
- Coach: Jacques Lemaire
- Captain: Rotating; Mikko Koivu (Oct.–Nov., Jan., Mar.–Apr.); Kim Johnsson (Dec.); Andrew Brunette (Feb.)
- Alternate captains: Rotating; Andrew Brunette (Oct.–Jan., Mar.–Apr.); Marian Gaborik (Oct.–Nov.); Kim Johnsson (Nov.); Mikko Koivu (Dec., Feb.); Owen Nolan (Jan., Mar.–Apr.); Nick Schultz (Feb.)
- Arena: Xcel Energy Center
- Average attendance: 18,568 (102.8%)

Team leaders
- Goals: Owen Nolan (25)
- Assists: Mikko Koivu (47)
- Points: Mikko Koivu (67)
- Penalty minutes: Derek Boogaard (87)
- Plus/minus: Kurtis Foster (+7)
- Wins: Niklas Backstrom (37)
- Goals against average: Josh Harding (2.21)

The 2008–09 Minnesota Wild season began October 11, 2008. It was the Wild's ninth season in the National Hockey League (NHL).

== Pre-season ==
At the conclusion of the Pre-season, the Wild finished with a 5–2 record.

2008 Pre-season Game Log: 5–2–0 (Home: 3–0–0; Road: 2–2–0)
#	Date	Visitor	Score	Home	OT	Decision	Attendance	Record	Recap
1	September 24	Columbus	1–2	Minnesota		Backstrom	18,064	1–0–0
2	September 26	Minnesota	3–4	Chicago		Harding	18,034	1–1–0
3	September 28	Minnesota	2–1	Buffalo	SO	Backstrom	17,311	2–1–0
4	September 30	Chicago	2–3	Minnesota	OT	Backstrom	18,064	3–1–0
5	October 1	Buffalo	2–3	Minnesota		Harding	18,064	4–1–0
6	October 3	Minnesota	3–5	Columbus		Backstrom	11,794	4–2–0
7	October 4	Minnesota	3–0	Montreal		Backstrom	21,273	5–2–0

== Regular season ==
The Wild were the most disciplined team in the League during the regular season, with just 291 power-play opportunities against. They also allowed the fewest power-play goals, with just 36.

=== Divisional standings ===
Northwest Division
		GP	W	L	OTL	GF	GA	Pts
**1**	**y – Vancouver Canucks**	**82**	**45**	**27**	**10**	**246**	**220**	**100**
**2**	**Calgary Flames**	**82**	**46**	**30**	**6**	**254**	**248**	**98**
3	Minnesota Wild	82	40	33	9	219	200	**89**
4	Edmonton Oilers	82	38	35	9	234	248	**85**
5	Colorado Avalanche	82	32	45	5	199	257	**69**

=== Conference standings ===
Western Conference
R		Div	GP	W	L	OTL	GF	GA	Pts
**1**	**p – San Jose Sharks**	**PA**	**82**	**53**	**18**	**11**	**257**	**204**	117
**2**	**y – Detroit Red Wings**	**CE**	**82**	**51**	**21**	**10**	**295**	**244**	112
**3**	**y – Vancouver Canucks**	**NW**	**82**	**45**	**27**	**10**	**246**	**220**	100
**4**	**Chicago Blackhawks**	**CE**	**82**	**46**	**24**	**12**	**264**	**216**	104
**5**	**Calgary Flames**	**NW**	**82**	**46**	**30**	**6**	**254**	**248**	98
**6**	**St. Louis Blues**	**CE**	**82**	**41**	**31**	**10**	**233**	**233**	92
**7**	**Columbus Blue Jackets**	**CE**	**82**	**41**	**31**	**10**	**226**	**230**	92
**8**	**Anaheim Ducks**	**PA**	**82**	**42**	**33**	**7**	**245**	**238**	91
8.5
9	Minnesota Wild	NW	82	40	33	9	219	200	89
10	Nashville Predators	CE	82	40	34	8	213	233	88
11	Edmonton Oilers	NW	82	38	35	9	234	248	85
12	Dallas Stars	PA	82	36	35	11	230	257	83
13	Phoenix Coyotes	PA	82	36	39	7	208	252	79
14	Los Angeles Kings	PA	82	34	37	11	207	234	79
15	Colorado Avalanche	NW	82	32	45	5	199	257	69

bold – qualified for playoffs, y – division winner, p – Presidents' Trophy winner
CE – Central Division, NW – Northwest Division, PA – Pacific Division

== Schedule and results ==
2008–09 Game Log

October: 6–2–1 (Home: 3–1–1; Road: 3–1–0)
#	Date	Visitor	Score	Home	OT	Decision	Attendance	Record	Pts	Recap
1	October 11	Boston	3–4	Minnesota		Backstrom	18,568	1–0–0	2
2	October 14	Minnesota	4–2	Atlanta		Backstrom	11,843	2–0–0	4
3	October 16	Minnesota	6–2	Florida		Backstrom	12,106	3–0–0	6
4	October 18	Minnesota	1–0	Tampa Bay	SO	Backstrom	15,191	4–0–0	8
5	October 23	Buffalo	4–3	Minnesota	OT	Backstrom	18,568	4–0–1	9
6	October 25	Columbus	1–2	Minnesota		Backstrom	18,568	5–0–1	11
7	October 27	Chicago	2–3	Minnesota		Backstrom	18,568	6–0–1	13
8	October 29	Minnesota	2–4	Dallas		Backstrom	18,431	6–1–1	13
9	October 30	Montreal	2–1	Minnesota		Harding	18,568	6–2–1	13

November: 8–5–0 (Home: 4–3–0; Road: 4–2–0)
#	Date	Visitor	Score	Home	OT	Decision	Attendance	Record	Pts	Recap
10	November 1	Minnesota	3–2	Phoenix		Backstrom	14,817	7–2–1	15
11	November 4	Minnesota	1–3	San Jose		Backstrom	17,183	7–3–1	15
12	November 6	Minnesota	3–1	Colorado		Backstrom	14,562	8–3–1	17
13	November 8	Minnesota	0–2	Vancouver		Backstrom	18,630	8–4–1	17
14	November 13	Phoenix	0–4	Minnesota		Backstrom	18,568	9–4–1	19
15	November 15	Columbus	2–3	Minnesota	SO	Backstrom	18,568	10–4–1	21
16	November 18	Minnesota	2–1	Pittsburgh	SO	Backstrom	16,971	11–4–1	23
17	November 20	Vancouver	3–2	Minnesota		Backstrom	18,568	11–5–1	23
18	November 22	St. Louis	2–1	Minnesota		Backstrom	18,568	11–6–1	23
19	November 24	Washington	3–4	Minnesota		Backstrom	18,568	12–6–1	25
20	November 26	Dallas	4–3	Minnesota		Backstrom	18,568	12–7–1	25
21	November 28	Tampa Bay	2–4	Minnesota		Backstrom	18,568	13–7–1	27
22	November 29	Minnesota	6–2	Nashville		Harding	13,990	14–7–1	29

December: 4–9–1 (Home: 4–3–1; Road: 0–6–0)
#	Date	Visitor	Score	Home	OT	Decision	Attendance	Record	Pts	Recap
23	December 1	Colorado	6–5	Minnesota		Backstrom	18,568	14–8–1	29
24	December 3	St. Louis	0–4	Minnesota		Backstrom	18,568	15–8–1	31
25	December 5	Vancouver	2–1	Minnesota		Backstrom	18,568	15–9–1	31
26	December 6	Minnesota	0–1	Nashville		Harding	14,408	15–10–1	31
27	December 11	Minnesota	1–3	Phoenix		Backstrom	13,296	15–11–1	31
28	December 13	Minnesota	1–3	Los Angeles		Backstrom	14,857	15–12–1	31
29	December 14	Minnesota	2–4	Anaheim		Harding	16,577	15–13–1	31
30	December 17	Calgary	3–2	Minnesota	OT	Backstrom	18,568	15–13–2	32
31	December 19	NY Islanders	1–4	Minnesota		Backstrom	18,568	16–13–2	34
32	December 20	Minnesota	2–4	St. Louis		Backstrom	19,150	16–14–2	34
33	December 23	Carolina	2–3	Minnesota		Backstrom	18,568	17–14–2	36
34	December 28	Chicago	4–1	Minnesota		Backstrom	18,568	17–15–2	36
35	December 29	Minnesota	1–2	Calgary		Harding	19,289	17–16–2	36
36	December 31	San Jose	2–3	Minnesota	OT	Backstrom	18,568	18–16–2	38

January: 7–5–1 (Home: 3–2–1; Road: 4–3–0)
#	Date	Visitor	Score	Home	OT	Decision	Attendance	Record	Pts	Recap
37	January 3	Detroit	3–2	Minnesota	SO	Harding	18,568	18–16–3	39
38	January 4	Minnesota	2–0	Colorado		Backstrom	14,125	19–16–3	41
39	January 6	Minnesota	1–0	Boston		Backstrom	16,272	20–16–3	43
40	January 8	Minnesota	1–3	Philadelphia		Backstrom	19,596	20–17–3	43
41	January 10	Minnesota	2–4	Columbus		Harding	16,605	20–18–3	43
42	January 13	Phoenix	3–6	Minnesota		Backstrom	18,568	21–18–3	45
43	January 15	Edmonton	1–5	Minnesota		Backstrom	18,568	22–18–3	47
44	January 17	Anaheim	3–0	Minnesota		Backstrom	18,568	22–19–3	47
45	January 19	Minnesota	4–1	Chicago		Backstrom	21,320	23–19–3	49
46	January 20	Los Angeles	5–2	Minnesota		Backstrom	18,568	23–20–3	49
47	January 27	Toronto	1–6	Minnesota		Backstrom	18,568	24–20–3	51
48	January 30	Minnesota	1–3	Edmonton		Backstrom	16,839	24–21–3	51
49	January 31	Minnesota	4–3	Vancouver	OT	Backstrom	18,630	25–21–3	53

February: 5–5–2 (Home: 4–2–2; Road: 1–3–0)
#	Date	Visitor	Score	Home	OT	Decision	Attendance	Record	Pts	Recap
50	February 4	Anaheim	0–3	Minnesota		Backstrom	18,568	26–21–3	55
51	February 6	Nashville	2–0	Minnesota		Backstrom	18,568	26–22–3	55
52	February 8	Edmonton	2–3	Minnesota	SO	Backstrom	18,568	27–22–3	57
53	February 11	Colorado	2–3	Minnesota		Backstrom	18,568	28–22–3	59
54	February 12	Minnesota	2–4	Detroit		Harding	20,066	28–23–3	59
55	February 14	Ottawa	5–3	Minnesota		Harding	18,568	28–24–3	59
56	February 19	Calgary	3–2	Minnesota	OT	Backstrom	18,568	28–24–4	60
57	February 21	Detroit	2–5	Minnesota		Backstrom	18,568	29–24–4	62
58	February 22	Minnesota	2–1	Chicago		Harding	22,443	30–24–4	64
59	February 24	Los Angeles	2–1	Minnesota	SO	Backstrom	18,568	30–24–5	65
60	February 27	Minnesota	1–4	Calgary		Backstrom	19,289	30–25–5	65
61	February 28	Minnesota	2–3	Edmonton		Harding	16,839	30–26–5	65

March: 6–6–4 (Home: 2–0–2; Road: 4–6–2)
#	Date	Visitor	Score	Home	OT	Decision	Attendance	Record	Pts	Recap
62	March 3	Minnesota	2–4	Vancouver		Backstrom	18,630	30–27–5	65
63	March 5	Minnesota	4–3	San Jose	OT	Backstrom	17,496	31–27–5	67
64	March 7	Minnesota	3–4	Los Angeles		Harding	18,118	31–28–5	67
65	March 8	Minnesota	3–2	Anaheim		Backstrom	17,300	32–28–5	69
66	March 10	San Jose	5–4	Minnesota	OT	Backstrom	18,568	32–28–6	70
67	March 12	Minnesota	1–2	Colorado	SO	Backstrom	14,213	32–28–7	71
68	March 14	Minnesota	2–3	Dallas	OT	Backstrom	18,584	32–28–8	72
69	March 15	Minnesota	3–5	St. Louis		Backstrom	19,150	32–29–8	72
70	March 17	Colorado	2–3	Minnesota	SO	Backstrom	18,568	33–29–8	74
71	March 20	Minnesota	0–4	New Jersey		Backstrom	17,625	33–30–8	74
72	March 22	Edmonton	0–3	Minnesota		Backstrom	18,568	34–30–8	76
73	March 24	Minnesota	1–2	NY Rangers		Backstrom	18,200	34–31–8	76
74	March 25	Minnesota	6–2	NY Islanders		Backstrom	13,332	35–31–8	78
75	March 28	Minnesota	2–3	Calgary		Backstrom	19,289	35–32–8	78
76	March 29	Minnesota	3–2	Edmonton		Backstrom	16,839	36–32–8	80
77	March 31	Vancouver	2–1	Minnesota	OT	Backstrom	18,568	36–32–9	81

April: 4–1–0 (Home: 3–0–0; Road: 1–1–0)
#	Date	Visitor	Score	Home	OT	Decision	Attendance	Record	Pts	Recap
78	April 3	Calgary	0–4	Minnesota		Backstrom	18,568	37–32–9	83
79	April 5	Minnesota	2–3	Detroit		Backstrom	20,066	37–33–9	83
80	April 7	Dallas	1–3	Minnesota		Backstrom	18,568	38–33–9	85
81	April 10	Nashville	4–8	Minnesota		Backstrom	18,568	39–33–9	87
82	April 11	Minnesota	6–3	Columbus		Harding	19,013	40–33–9	89

Legend: Win (2 points) Loss (0 points) Overtime/shootout loss (1 point)

== Player statistics ==
=== Skaters ===
Note: Pos = Position; GP = Games played; G = Goals; A = Assists; Pts = Points; PIM = Penalty minutes; +/- = Plus/minus; PPG = Power-play goals; SHG = Short-handed goals; GWG = Game-winning goals

Regular season

Player	GP	G	A	Pts	+/−	PIM
Mikko Koivu	79	20	47	67	+2	66
Andrew Brunette	80	22	28	50	-5	18
Pierre-Marc Bouchard	71	16	30	46	-5	20
Owen Nolan	59	25	20	45	+5	26
Antti Miettinen	82	15	29	44	-1	32
Marek Zidlicky	76	12	30	42	-12	76
Eric Belanger	79	13	23	36	-5	26
Marc-Andre Bergeron	72	14	18	32	+5	30
Brent Burns	59	8	19	27	-7	45
Kim Johnsson	81	2	22	24	-3	44
James Sheppard	82	5	19	24	-14	41
Marian Gaborik	17	13	10	23	+3	2
Stephane Veilleux	81	13	10	23	-17	40
Cal Clutterbuck	78	11	7	18	-5	76
Martin Skoula	81	4	12	16	-12	10
Nick Schultz	79	2	9	11	-4	31
Benoit Pouliot	37	5	6	11	+1	18
Dan Fritsche^{†}	34	4	5	9	-3	10
Peter Olvecky	31	2	5	7	+1	12
Colton Gillies	45	2	5	7	-2	18
Krys Kolanos	21	3	3	6	+3	16
Kurtis Foster	10	1	5	6	+7	6
Craig Weller	36	1	2	3	-3	47
Derek Boogaard	51	0	3	3	+3	87
Erik Reitz^{‡}	31	1	1	2	-2	41
Tomas Mojzis	4	0	1	1	-1	2
John Scott	20	0	1	1	-1	21

=== Goaltenders ===
Note: Pos = Position;GP = Games played; Min, TOI = Minutes played; W = Wins; L = Losses; T,T/OT = Ties; OTL = Overtime losses; GA = Goals-against; GAA = Goals-against average; SO = Shutouts; SA = Shots against; SV = Shots saved; SV% = Save percentage;

Regular season

Player	GP	Min	W	L	OT	GA	GAA	SA	SV	Sv%	SO
Niklas Backstrom	71	4088	37	24	8	159	2.33	2059	1900	.923	8
Josh Harding	19	869	3	9	1	32	2.21	453	421	.929	0

^{†}Denotes player spent time with another team before joining Wild. Stats reflect time with Wild only.
^{‡}Traded mid-season. Stats reflect time with Wild only.

== Awards and records ==
=== Milestones ===
Regular Season
Player	Milestone	Reached
Niklas Backstrom	100th NHL Game	October 11, 2008
Colton Gillies	1st NHL Game; 1st NHL Assist; 1st NHL Point	October 11, 2008
Kim Johnsson	600th NHL Game	October 14, 2008
Antti Miettinen	100th NHL Point	October 27, 2008
Andrew Brunette	800th NHL Game	November 6, 2008
Erik Reitz	1st NHL Goal; 1st NHL Point	November 15, 2008

== Transactions ==
=== Trades ===
June 20, 2008	To Minnesota Wild 23rd pick in 2008 (Tyler Cuma)	To New Jersey Devils 24th pick in 2008 (Mattias Tedenby); 3rd-round pick in 2009 (Alexander Urbom)
July 1, 2008	To Minnesota Wild Marek Zidlicky	To Nashville Predators Ryan Jones; 2nd-round pick in 2009 (Charles-Olivier Roussel)
June 10, 2008	To Minnesota Wild Marc-Andre Bergeron	To Anaheim Ducks 3rd-round pick in 2009 (Brandon McMillan)
July 11, 2008	To Minnesota Wild Corey Locke	To Montreal Canadiens Shawn Belle
January 21, 2008	To Minnesota Wild Robbie Earl	To Toronto Maple Leafs Ryan Hamilton
January 29, 2008	To Minnesota Wild Dan Fritsche	To New York Rangers Erik Reitz

=== Free agents ===
Player	Former team	Contract Terms
Antti Miettinen	Dallas Stars	3 years, $7 million
Owen Nolan	Calgary Flames	2 years, $5.5 million
Andrew Brunette	Colorado Avalanche	3 years, $7 million

Player	New team
Todd Fedoruk	Phoenix Coyotes
Brian Rolston	New Jersey Devils
Pavol Demitra	Vancouver Canucks
Joel Ward	Nashville Predators

== Draft picks ==
Minnesota's picks at the 2008 NHL entry draft in Ottawa, Ontario.

Round	#	Player	Position	Nationality	College/Junior/Club team (League)
1	23 (from Washington via New Jersey)	Tyler Cuma	(D)	Canada	Ottawa 67's (OHL)
2	55	Marco Scandella	(D)	Canada	Val-d'Or Foreurs (QMJHL)
4	115	Sean Lorenz	(D)	Canada	U.S. National Team Development Program (NAHL)
5	145	Eero Elo	(LW)	Finland	Lukko (Finland Jr.)

== See also ==
- 2008–09 NHL season
