= 2008–09 Columbus Blue Jackets season =

National Hockey League season

2008–09 Columbus Blue Jackets
- Division: 4th Central
- Conference: 7th Western
- 2008–09 record: 41–31–10
- Home record: 25–13–3
- Road record: 16–18–7
- Goals for: 226
- Goals against: 230

Team information
- General manager: Scott Howson
- Coach: Ken Hitchcock
- Captain: Rick Nash
- Alternate captains: Rostislav Klesla; Fredrik Modin; Michael Peca
- Arena: Nationwide Arena
- Average attendance: 15,543

Team leaders
- Goals: Rick Nash (40)
- Assists: Rick Nash (39)
- Points: Rick Nash (79)
- Penalty minutes: Jared Boll (180)
- Plus/minus: Jan Hejda (+23)
- Wins: Steve Mason (33)
- Goals against average: Steve Mason (2.29)

The 2008–09 Columbus Blue Jackets season was the ninth National Hockey League (NHL) season in Columbus, Ohio. On April 8, 2009, the Blue Jackets clinched a playoff berth after a shootout victory against the Chicago Blackhawks, the first berth in team history.

== Preseason ==
The Jackets selected Russian forward Nikita Filatov with the sixth overall pick at the 2008 NHL entry draft. Filatov made an immediate impact with Columbus, scoring a goal in his NHL debut against the Nashville Predators. Columbus was rather aggressive in free agency, signing proven forward Kristian Huselius, and solidifying the defensive core with veteran Mike Commodore. General Manager Scott Howson also engineered two key pre-season trades, trading a draft pick to the Philadelphia Flyers for R. J. Umberger, and trading stars Nikolay Zherdev and Dan Fritsche to the New York Rangers in exchange for defensemen Fedor Tyutin and Christian Backman.

== Regular season ==
Rookie goaltender Steve Mason, who missed the first month of the season following knee surgery, led the Blue Jackets into playoff contention at the All-Star break. Recalled from the American Hockey League's Syracuse Crunch following Pascal Leclaire's injury, Mason was named the Rookie of the Month by the NHL for November after recording five wins in eight decisions, including two shutouts. He again won Rookie of the Month honors in December, and was named to the YoungStars team at the 2009 All-Star Game in Montreal, though he declined to play after suffering back spasms. Captain Rick Nash was the team's representative at the All-Star Game, his fourth appearance at the game. Rookie Nikita Filatov scored his first career hat trick on January 10, 2009, in a 4–2 win against the Minnesota Wild. Filatov's achievement marked the first hat trick by a Blue Jackets rookie. On the eve of the NHL trade deadline, Columbus traded recently oft-injured goaltender Pascal Leclaire and a draft pick to the Ottawa Senators for forward Antoine Vermette. Vermette made an instant impact with the club, racking up seven points in his first six games.

The Blue Jackets struggled on the power play, finishing 30th in power-play goals (41) and power-play percentage (12.73%). They also had the most shutouts of any team in the league, with 11.

=== Divisional standings ===
Central Division
		GP	W	L	OTL	GF	GA	Pts
**1**	**y – Detroit Red Wings**	**82**	**51**	**21**	**10**	**295**	**244**	**112**
**2**	**Chicago Blackhawks**	**82**	**46**	**24**	**12**	**264**	**216**	**104**
**3**	**St. Louis Blues**	**82**	**41**	**31**	**10**	**233**	**233**	**92**
**4**	**Columbus Blue Jackets**	**82**	**41**	**31**	**10**	**226**	**230**	**92**
5	Nashville Predators	82	40	34	8	213	233	88

=== Conference standings ===
Western Conference
R		Div	GP	W	L	OTL	GF	GA	Pts
**1**	**p – San Jose Sharks**	**PA**	**82**	**53**	**18**	**11**	**257**	**204**	117
**2**	**y – Detroit Red Wings**	**CE**	**82**	**51**	**21**	**10**	**295**	**244**	112
**3**	**y – Vancouver Canucks**	**NW**	**82**	**45**	**27**	**10**	**246**	**220**	100
**4**	**Chicago Blackhawks**	**CE**	**82**	**46**	**24**	**12**	**264**	**216**	104
**5**	**Calgary Flames**	**NW**	**82**	**46**	**30**	**6**	**254**	**248**	98
**6**	**St. Louis Blues**	**CE**	**82**	**41**	**31**	**10**	**233**	**233**	92
**7**	**Columbus Blue Jackets**	**CE**	**82**	**41**	**31**	**10**	**226**	**230**	92
**8**	**Anaheim Ducks**	**PA**	**82**	**42**	**33**	**7**	**245**	**238**	91
8.5
9	Minnesota Wild	NW	82	40	33	9	219	200	89
10	Nashville Predators	CE	82	40	34	8	213	233	88
11	Edmonton Oilers	NW	82	38	35	9	234	248	85
12	Dallas Stars	PA	82	36	35	11	230	257	83
13	Phoenix Coyotes	PA	82	36	39	7	208	252	79
14	Los Angeles Kings	PA	82	34	37	11	207	234	79
15	Colorado Avalanche	NW	82	32	45	5	199	257	69

bold – qualified for playoffs, y – division winner, p – Presidents' Trophy winner
CE – Central Division, NW – Northwest Division, PA – Pacific Division

== Schedule and results ==
=== Pre-season ===
2008 pre-season game log: 4–4–0 (home: 3–1–0; road: 1–3–0)
#	Date	Visitor	Score	Home	OT	Decision	Attendance	Record	Recap
1	September 23	Columbus	3–4	Chicago				0–1–0	Recap
2	September 24	Columbus	1–2	Minnesota				0–2–0	Recap
3	September 26	Nashville	3–4	Columbus				1–2–0	Recap
4	September 27	Columbus	1–3	Nashville				1–3–0	Recap
5	September 29	Chicago	1–7	Columbus				2–3–0	Recap
6	October 2	Buffalo	5–2	Columbus				2–4–0	Recap
7	October 3	Minnesota	3–5	Columbus				3–4–0	Recap
8	October 5	Columbus	5–4	Toronto	SO			4–4–0	Recap

=== Regular season ===
2008–09 game log

October: 4–6–0 (home: 2–2–0; road: 2–4–0)
#	Date	Visitor	Score	Home	OT	Decision	Attendance	Record	Pts	Recap
1	October 10	Columbus	5 – 4	Dallas	OT	Leclaire	18,532	1–0–0	2	Recap
2	October 11	Columbus	1 – 3	Phoenix		Leclaire	17,125	1–1–0	2	Recap
3	October 14	Columbus	2 – 5	San Jose		Leclaire	17,496	1–2–0	2	Recap
4	October 17	Nashville	3 – 5	Columbus		Leclaire	17,930	2–2–0	4	Recap
5	October 18	Columbus	3 – 6	Nashville		Norrena	13,259	2–3–0	4	Recap
6	October 21	Vancouver	2 - 4	Columbus		Leclaire	12,057	3-3-0	6	Recap
7	October 24	N.Y. Rangers	3 - 1	Columbus		Leclaire	14,724	3-4-0	6	Recap
8	October 25	Columbus	1 - 2	Minnesota		Leclaire	18,568	3-5-0	6	Recap
9	October 27	Anaheim	3 - 2	Columbus		Norrena	10,494	3-6-0	6	Recap
10	October 30	Columbus	4 - 2	Colorado		Norrena	14,945	4-6-0	8	Recap

November: 6–4–3 (home: 4–3–1; road: 2–1–2)
#	Date	Visitor	Score	Home	OT	Decision	Attendance	Record	Pts	Recap
11	November 1	Chicago	4 - 3	Columbus	SO	Norrena	14,680	4-6-1	9	Recap
12	November 3	Columbus	3 - 4	N.Y. Islanders	OT	Norrena	10,184	4-6-2	10	Recap
13	November 5	Edmonton	4 - 5	Columbus		Mason	11,228	5-6-2	12	Recap
14	November 7	Montreal	3 - 4	Columbus	SO	Mason	14,603	6-6-2	14	Recap
15	November 8	Calgary	1 – 3	Columbus		Mason	14,088	7–6–2	16	Recap
16	November 12	Phoenix	5 – 2	Columbus		Mason	11,350	7–7–2	16	Recap
17	November 14	Columbus	6 – 1	Buffalo		Leclaire	18,690	8–7–2	18	Recap
18	November 15	Columbus	2 - 3	Minnesota	SO	Mason	18,568	8-7-3	19	Recap
19	November 18	Edmonton	7 - 2	Columbus		Leclaire	12,689	8-8-3	19	Recap
20	November 22	Columbus	2 - 0	Atlanta		Mason	15,561	9-8-3	21	Recap
21	November 26	Phoenix	3 - 2	Columbus		Mason	14,569	9-9-3	21	Recap
22	November 28	Columbus	3 - 5	Detroit		Leclaire	20,066	9-10-3	21	Recap
23	November 29	Washington	0 - 3	Columbus		Mason	17,448	10-10-3	23	Recap

December: 7–6–1 (home: 5–1–0; road: 2–5–1)
#	Date	Visitor	Score	Home	OT	Decision	Attendance	Record	Pts	Recap
24	December 1	Vancouver	2 - 3	Columbus		Mason	13,299	11-10-3	25	Recap
25	December 4	Columbus	2 - 3	San Jose		Mason	17,496	11-11-3	25	Recap
26	December 6	Columbus	0 - 3	Los Angeles		Mason	15,235	11-12-3	25	Recap
27	December 7	Columbus	3 - 5	Anaheim		Leclaire	16,914	11-13-3	25	Recap
28	December 11	Nashville	1 - 2	Columbus	SO	Mason	13,484	12-13-3	27	Recap
29	December 13	N.Y. Islanders	1 - 3	Columbus		Mason	15,443	13-13-3	29	Recap
30	December 14	Columbus	1 - 3	Chicago		Mason	21,379	13-14-3	29	Recap
31	December 17	San Jose	1 - 2	Columbus	OT	Mason	13,884	14-14-3	31	Recap
32	December 18	Columbus	5 - 6	Dallas	SO	Leclaire	16,281	14-14-4	32	Recap
33	December 20	Columbus	0 - 2	Phoenix		Mason	16,125	14-15-4	32	Recap
34	December 23	Los Angeles	3 - 0	Columbus		Mason	15,145	14-16-4	32	Recap
35	December 27	Philadelphia	0 - 3	Columbus		Mason	18,402	15-16-4	34	Recap
36	December 29	Columbus	2 - 0	Los Angeles		Mason	18,118	16-16-4	36	Recap
37	December 31	Columbus	2 - 0	Anaheim		Mason	16,758	17-16-4	38	Recap

January: 7–5–1 (home: 4–2–0; road: 3–3–1)
#	Date	Visitor	Score	Home	OT	Decision	Attendance	Record	Pts	Recap
38	January 2	Columbus	6 - 1	Colorado		Mason	14,482	18-16-4	40	Recap
39	January 3	Columbus	2 - 5	St. Louis		Mason	19,150	18-17-4	40	Recap
40	January 6	Columbus	0 - 3	Detroit		Mason	19,717	18-18-4	40	Recap
41	January 9	Columbus	3 - 0	Washington		Mason	18,277	19-18-4	42	Recap
42	January 10	Minnesota	2 - 4	Columbus		Mason	16,605	20-18-4	44	Recap
43	January 13	Colorado	3 - 4	Columbus		Mason	15,343	21-18-4	46	Recap
44	January 16	New Jersey	2 - 1	Columbus		Mason	17,738	21-19-4	46	Recap
45	January 18	Columbus	6 – 5	Vancouver	SO	Mason	18,630	22–19–4	48	Recap
46	January 20	Columbus	3 – 4	Edmonton		Mason	16,839	22–20–4	48	Recap
47	January 21	Columbus	4 – 5	Calgary	SO	Mason	19,289	22–20–5	49	Recap
48	January 27	Detroit	2 - 3	Columbus	OT	Mason	16,348	23-20-5	51	Recap
49	January 30	Ottawa	0 - 1	Columbus		Mason	17,080	24-20-5	53	Recap
50	January 31	Dallas	7 - 3	Columbus		Dubielewicz	18,049	24-21-5	53	Recap

February: 7–4–1 (home: 4–2–1; road: 3–2–0)
#	Date	Visitor	Score	Home	OT	Decision	Attendance	Record	Pts	Recap
51	February 3	St. Louis	4 - 2	Columbus		Mason	13,560	24-22-5	53	Recap
52	February 6	Columbus	1 - 4	Pittsburgh		Dubielewicz	17,050	24-23-5	53	Recap
53	February 7	San Jose	2 - 3	Columbus	OT	LaCosta	18,144	25-23-5	55	Recap
54	February 10	Colorado	0 - 3	Columbus		LaCosta	14,506	26-23-5	57	Recap
55	February 13	Detroit	2 - 3	Columbus		Mason	18,802	27-23-5	59	Recap
56	February 14	Columbus	5 - 1	Carolina		Mason	18,680	28-23-5	61	Recap
57	February 16	Dallas	3 - 2	Columbus	SO	Mason	15,006	28-23-6	62	Recap
58	February 18	St. Louis	3 - 4	Columbus		Mason	14,305	29-23-6	64	Recap
59	February 19	Columbus	4 - 3	Toronto	SO	Mason	19,179	30-23-6	66	Recap
60	February 21	Anaheim	5 - 2	Columbus		Mason	18,628	30-24-6	66	Recap
61	February 24	Columbus	1 - 4	Calgary		Mason	19,289	30-25-6	66	Recap
62	February 26	Columbus	1 - 0	Edmonton		Mason	16,839	31-25-6	68	Recap

March: 9–4–2 (home: 6–2–0; road: 3–2–2)
#	Date	Visitor	Score	Home	OT	Decision	Attendance	Record	Pts	Recap
63	March 1	Columbus	1 - 3	Vancouver		Mason	18,630	31-26-6	68	Recap
64	March 3	Los Angeles	4 - 5	Columbus		Mason	15,049	32-26-6	70	Recap
65	March 5	Columbus	2 - 4	Nashville		Mason	13,064	32-27-6	70	Recap
66	March 7	Columbus	8 - 2	Detroit		Mason	20,066	33-27-6	72	Recap
67	March 10	Boston	0 - 2	Columbus		Mason	16,675	34-27-6	74	Recap
68	March 12	Pittsburgh	3 - 4	Columbus	SO	Mason	19,167	35-27-6	76	Recap
69	March 13	Columbus	5 - 3	Chicago		Dubielewicz	22,176	36-27-6	78	Recap
70	March 15	Detroit	4 - 0	Columbus		Mason	18,685	36-28-6	78	Recap
71	March 18	Chicago	3 - 4	Columbus	OT	Mason	15,190	37-28-6	80	Recap
72	March 21	Columbus	3 - 1	Florida		Mason	17,032	38-28-6	82	Recap
73	March 24	Columbus	1 - 2	Tampa Bay	OT	Mason	14,454	38-28-7	83	Recap
74	March 26	Calgary	0 - 5	Columbus		Mason	16,327	39-28-7	85	Recap
75	March 28	Columbus	3 - 4	St. Louis	SO	Mason	19,250	39-28-8	86	Recap
76	March 29	St. Louis	5 - 2	Columbus		Mason	17,095	39-29-8	86	Recap
77	March 31	Nashville	1 - 2	Columbus		Mason	14,495	40-29-8	88	Recap

April: 1–2–2 (home: 0–1–1; road: 1–1–1)
#	Date	Visitor	Score	Home	OT	Decision	Attendance	Record	Pts	Recap
78	April 4	Columbus	4 - 5	Nashville	OT	Mason	16,750	40-29-9	89	Recap
79	April 5	Chicago	1 - 0	Columbus	OT	Mason	15,957	40-29-10	90	Recap
80	April 8	Columbus	4 - 3	Chicago	SO	Mason	21,536	41-29-10	92	Recap
81	April 10	Columbus	1 - 3	St. Louis		Mason	19,250	41-30-10	92	Recap
82	April 11	Minnesota	6 - 3	Columbus		Mason	19,013	41-31-10	92	Recap

Legend: Win (2 points) Loss (0 points) Overtime/shootout loss (1 point)

== Playoffs ==
The Blue Jackets have reached the Stanley Cup playoffs for the first time in franchise history.

2009 Stanley Cup playoffs

Western Conference quarter-finals: vs. (2) Detroit Red Wings: Detroit won series 4–0
#	Date	Visitor	Score	Home	OT	Goaltender	Attendance	Series	Recap
1	April 16	Columbus	1–4	Detroit		Mason	20,066	0–1	Recap
2	April 18	Columbus	0–4	Detroit		Mason	20,066	0–2	Recap
3	April 21	Detroit	4–1	Columbus		Mason	19,219	0–3	Recap
4	April 23	Detroit	6–5	Columbus		Mason	18,889	0–4	Recap

Legend: Win Loss

== Player statistics ==
=== Skaters ===
Note: Pos = Position; GP = Games played; G = Goals; A = Assists; Pts = Points; PIM = Penalty minutes; +/- = Plus/minus; PPG = Power-play goals; SHG = Short-handed goals; GWG = Game-winning goals

Regular season

Player	GP	G	A	Pts	+/−	PIM
Rick Nash	78	40	39	79	+11	52
Kristian Huselius	74	21	35	56	+1	44
R. J. Umberger	82	26	20	46	-10	53
Jakub Voráček	80	9	29	38	+11	44
Manny Malhotra	77	11	24	35	+9	28
Fedor Tyutin	82	9	25	34	+1	81
Jason Williams^{†}	39	12	17	29	+5	16
Fredrik Modin	50	9	16	25	+2	28
Derick Brassard	31	10	15	25	+12	17
Mike Commodore	81	5	19	24	+11	100
Michael Peca	71	4	18	22	-6	58
Jason Chimera	49	8	14	22	+8	41
Kris Russell	66	2	19	21	-10	28
Jan Hejda	82	3	18	21	+23	38
Raffi Torres	51	12	8	20	-4	23
Marc Methot	66	4	13	17	+7	55
Jared Boll	75	4	10	14	-6	180
Antoine Vermette^{†}	17	7	6	13	+5	8
Andrew Murray	67	8	3	11	-6	10
Rostislav Klesla	34	1	8	9	+2	38
Christian Backman	56	2	5	7	+5	32
Jiri Novotny	42	4	3	7	+4	14
Derek Dorsett	52	4	1	5	-1	150
Nikita Filatov	8	4	0	4	+3	0
Craig MacDonald	8	1	1	2	+1	0
Chris Gratton^{†}	6	0	1	1	+2	2
Aaron Rome	8	0	1	1	+1	0
Ole-Kristian Tollefsen	19	0	1	1	-4	37
Alexandre Picard	15	0	1	1	-1	26
Clay Wilson^{‡}	5	0	1	1	-2	0
Mike York	1	0	0	0	0	0
Derek MacKenzie	1	0	0	0	-1	2
Maxim Mayorov	3	0	0	0	0	0

Playoffs

Player	GP	G	A	Pts	+/−	PIM
Rick Nash	4	1	2	3	-4	2
R. J. Umberger	4	3	0	3	0	0
Kristian Huselius	4	1	1	2	-4	4
Raffi Torres	4	0	2	2	-3	2
Kris Russell	4	1	1	2	0	2
Rostislav Klesla	4	0	1	1	0	0
Fredrik Modin	4	1	0	1	-2	0
Jason Williams	4	0	1	1	-2	2
Jason Chimera	4	0	1	1	0	2
Aaron Rome	1	0	1	1	+2	0
Jakub Voráček	4	0	1	1	0	8
Manny Malhotra	4	0	0	0	-2	0
Michael Peca	4	0	0	0	+1	2
Mike Commodore	4	0	0	0	-7	18
Antoine Vermette	4	0	0	0	-4	10
Fedor Tyutin	4	0	0	0	0	0
Marc Methot	4	0	0	0	-3	2
Jan Hejda	3	0	0	0	-5	2
Jared Boll	1	0	0	0	-2	0
Derek Dorsett	3	0	0	0	-1	2

=== Goaltenders ===
Note: Pos = Position;GP = Games played; Min, TOI = Minutes played; W = Wins; L = Losses; T,T/OT = Ties; OTL = Overtime losses; GA = Goals-against; GAA = Goals-against average; SO = Shutouts; SA = Shots against; SV = Shots saved; SV% = Save percentage;

Regular season

Player	GP	Min	W	L	OT	GA	GAA	SA	SV	Sv%	SO
Steve Mason	61	3663	33	20	7	140	2.29	1658	1518	.916	10
Pascal Leclaire^{‡}	12	673	4	6	1	43	3.83	324	281	.867	0
Fredrik Norrena	8	323	1	3	2	17	3.16	133	116	.872	0
Wade Dubielewicz	3	168	1	2	0	10	3.56	77	67	.870	0
Dan LaCosta	3	155	2	0	0	4	1.54	80	76	.950	1

Playoffs

Player	GP	Min	W	L	GA	GAA	SA	SV	Sv%	SO
Steve Mason	4	239	0	4	17	4.26	139	122	.878	0

^{†}Denotes player spent time with another team before joining Blue Jackets. Stats reflect time with the Blue Jackets only.
^{‡}Traded mid-season
Italics denotes franchise record

== Awards and records ==
=== Awards ===
Steve Mason - Calder Memorial Trophy

Rick Nash – NHL Foundation Player Award

=== Records ===
Player	Record	Number	Reached
Steve Mason	Consecutive shutout minutes	199:19	January 2, 2009
Rick Nash	Most Points Scored - Career	318 pts	January 18, 2009
Team	Most Goals Scored - Game	8 goals	March 7, 2009
Team	Largest Margin of Victory	6 goals	March 7, 2009
Steve Mason	Most Wins - Season	28 wins	March 12, 2009
Team	Most Wins - Season	36 wins	March 13, 2009
Team	Most Points - Season	82 points	March 21, 2009
Steve Mason	Most Shutouts - Season	10 shutouts	March 26, 2009
Rick Nash	Most Points Scored - Season	79 pts	April 8, 2009
Jan Hejda	Highest Plus/Minus Rating - Season	+23	April 11, 2009

=== Milestones ===
Regular season
Player	Milestone	Reached
Jakub Voracek	1st NHL Game; 1st NHL Goal; 1st NHL Assist; 1st NHL Point	October 10, 2008
Derek Dorsett	1st NHL Game	October 11, 2008
Mike Commodore	300th NHL Game	October 17, 2008
Nikita Filatov	1st NHL Game; 1st NHL Goal; 1st NHL Point	October 17, 2008
Marc Methot	1st NHL Goal	October 18, 2008
Derek Dorsett	1st NHL Goal; 1st NHL Point	October 21, 2008
Derek Dorsett	1st NHL Assist	October 30, 2008
Steve Mason	1st NHL Game; 1st NHL Win	November 5, 2008
Steve Mason	1st NHL Shutout	November 22, 2008
Maksim Mayorov	1st NHL Game	January 3, 2009
Nikita Filatov	1st NHL Hat Trick	January 10, 2009
Fredrik Modin	800th NHL Game	January 10, 2009
Ken Hitchcock	500th NHL Victory	February 19, 2009

== Transactions ==
=== Trades ===
June 20, 2008	To Columbus Blue Jackets R. J. Umberger; 4th-round pick in 2008 – Drew Olson	To Philadelphia Flyers 1st-round pick in 2008 – Luca Sbisa; Third-round pick in 2008 – Marc-Andre Bourdon
July 1, 2008	To Columbus Blue Jackets Raffi Torres	To Edmonton Oilers Gilbert Brule
July 2, 2008	To Columbus Blue Jackets Fedor Tyutin; Christian Backman	To New York Rangers Nikolay Zherdev; Dan Fritsche
January 10, 2009	To Columbus Blue Jackets Mike Blunden	To Chicago Blackhawks Adam Pineault
January 14, 2009	To Columbus Blue Jackets Jason Williams	To Atlanta Thrashers Clay Wilson; 6th-round pick in 2009 – David Pacan
March 4, 2009	To Columbus Blue Jackets Antoine Vermette	To Ottawa Senators Pascal Leclaire; 2nd-round pick in 2009 – Robin Lehner
March 4, 2009	To Columbus Blue Jackets Kevin Lalande	To Calgary Flames 4th-round pick in 2009 – Garrett Wilson

=== Free agents ===
Player	Former team	Contract terms
Mike Commodore	Ottawa Senators	5 years, $18.75 million
Kristian Huselius	Calgary Flames	4 years, $19 million

Player	New team
Ron Hainsey	Atlanta Thrashers
Zenon Konopka	Tampa Bay Lightning

=== Claimed from waivers ===
Player	Former team	Date claimed off waivers
Wade Dubielewicz	New York Islanders	January 17, 2009
Chris Gratton	Tampa Bay Lightning	February 21, 2009

== Draft picks ==
The Blue Jackets entered the 2008 NHL entry draft in Ottawa with the sixth overall selection. Columbus drafted Russian forward Nikita Filatov with the pick. Filatov started the season with the Jackets' American Hockey League affiliate, scoring two goals in two games for the Syracuse Crunch before being recalled to the NHL. Filatov made his NHL debut on October 17, scoring a goal against the Nashville Predators.

Rnd	Pick	Player	Nat	Pos	Team (league)	NHL statistics				
Rnd	Pick	Player	Nat	Pos	Team (league)	GP	G	A	Pts	PIM
1	6	Nikita Filatov	Russia	LW	CSKA Moscow (RSL)	Made debut in 2008–09				
2	37	Cody Goloubef	Canada	D	University of Wisconsin (WCHA)					
4	107	Steven Delisle	Canada	D	Gatineau Olympiques (QMJHL)					
4	118	Drew Olson	United States	D	Brainerd High School (USHS-MN)					
5	127	Matt Calvert	Canada	LW	Brandon Wheat Kings (WHL)					
5	135	Tomas Kubalik	Czech Republic	RW	HC Plzeň (Czech Extraliga)					
5	137	Brent Regner	Canada	D	Vancouver Giants (WHL)					
6	157	Cam Atkinson	United States	RW	Avon Old Farms (USHS-CT)					
7	187	Sean Collins	Canada	C	Waywayseecappo Wolverines (MJHL)					

== See also ==
- 2008–09 NHL season

== Farm teams ==
=== American Hockey League ===
Syracuse Crunch

=== ECHL ===
Johnstown Chiefs: GM Scott Howson announced on August 22, 2008 that the Blue Jackets reached an agreement with the Johnstown Chiefs to serve as the club's ECHL affiliate for the 2008–09 season, replacing the Elmira Jackals.
