= 2008–09 Phoenix Coyotes season =

NHL hockey team season

2008–09 Phoenix Coyotes
- Division: 4th Pacific
- Conference: 13th Western
- 2008–09 record: 36–39–7
- Home record: 23–15–3
- Road record: 13–24–4
- Goals for: 208
- Goals against: 252

Team information
- General manager: Don Maloney
- Coach: Wayne Gretzky
- Captain: Shane Doan
- Alternate captains: Ed Jovanovski; Derek Morris (Oct.–Mar.); Steven Reinprecht
- Arena: Jobing.com Arena
- Average attendance: 14,876 (83.6%); Total: 609,907

Team leaders
- Goals: Shane Doan (31)
- Assists: Shane Doan (42)
- Points: Shane Doan (73)
- Penalty minutes: Daniel Carcillo (174)
- Plus/minus: Ken Klee (+9)
- Wins: Ilya Bryzgalov (26)
- Goals against average: Al Montoya (2.08)

The 2008–09 Phoenix Coyotes season was the team's 37th season, 30th season in the National Hockey League and 13th season as the Phoenix Coyotes. It saw the Coyotes attempt to qualify for the Stanley Cup playoffs for the first time since 2002. However, during the month of March, they were eliminated from the playoffs, and ended up 13th in the NHL's Western Conference.

== Preseason ==
The Phoenix Coyotes played eight preseason exhibition games to prepare for the regular season. Three games were at home, and the other five were on the road, including the franchise's first game back in Winnipeg, Manitoba, since the team moved from there to Phoenix in 1996. The Coyotes finished the preseason with a 2–5–1 record.

2008 Preseason Game Log: 2–5–1 (Home: 2–2–0; Road: 0–3–1)
#	Date	Visitor	Score	Home	OT	Decision	Attendance	Record	Recap
1	September 22	Phoenix	4–6	Los Angeles		Montoya	8,221	0–1–0
2	September 24	Calgary	3–2	Phoenix		?	15,015 (Winnipeg)	0–2–0
3	September 25	Phoenix	1–3	Calgary		Tellqvist	19,289	0–3–0
4	September 27	Anaheim	3–1	Phoenix		Bryzgalov	8,417	0–4–0
5	September 29	San Jose	1–5	Phoenix		Bryzgalov	7,305	1–4–0
6	September 30	Phoenix	3–4	San Jose	OT	Montoya	15,843	1–4–1
7	October 3	Phoenix	1–4	Anaheim		Tellqvist	16,371	1–5–1
8	October 4	Los Angeles	2–5	Phoenix		Bryzgalov	8,621	2–5–1

== Regular season ==
On December 23, the Toronto-based The Globe and Mail newspaper reported that the Phoenix Coyotes team was receiving financial assistance from the NHL in the form of advances on League revenues. The Coyotes have pledged all of their assets to New York company SOF Investments LP to cover an estimated debt of $80 million. The team has lost an estimated $200 million since 2001 and may lose $30 million this season. One of the team's owners, Jerry Moyes' principal source of revenue, Swift Transportation, is also in financial difficulty. ESPN reported that the League has become involved with the operations of the Coyotes and their revenues. The NHL apparently wants to work with the City of Glendale, which owns Jobing.com Arena and receives revenues from the team. If no investors are interested in keeping the team in Phoenix, Kansas City, Winnipeg or Hamilton will likely be healthier destinations for the franchise to relocate. ESPN also reported that Moyes wants to sell his share of the team and that Hollywood producer Jerry Bruckheimer is a possible interested purchaser.

=== Divisional standings ===
Pacific Division
		GP	W	L	OTL	GF	GA	Pts
**1**	**p – San Jose Sharks**	**82**	**53**	**18**	**11**	**257**	**204**	**117**
**2**	**Anaheim Ducks**	**82**	**42**	**33**	**7**	**245**	**238**	**91**
3	Dallas Stars	82	36	35	11	230	257	83
4	Phoenix Coyotes	82	36	39	7	208	252	79
5	Los Angeles Kings	82	34	37	11	207	234	79

Note: No. = Division rank, CR = Conference rank, W = Wins, L = Losses, T = Ties, GF = Goals For, GA = Goals Against, Pts = Points
Teams that qualified for the playoffs are highlighted in bold.

=== Conference standings ===
Western Conference
R		Div	GP	W	L	OTL	GF	GA	Pts
**1**	**p – San Jose Sharks**	**PA**	**82**	**53**	**18**	**11**	**257**	**204**	117
**2**	**y – Detroit Red Wings**	**CE**	**82**	**51**	**21**	**10**	**295**	**244**	112
**3**	**y – Vancouver Canucks**	**NW**	**82**	**45**	**27**	**10**	**246**	**220**	100
**4**	**Chicago Blackhawks**	**CE**	**82**	**46**	**24**	**12**	**264**	**216**	104
**5**	**Calgary Flames**	**NW**	**82**	**46**	**30**	**6**	**254**	**248**	98
**6**	**St. Louis Blues**	**CE**	**82**	**41**	**31**	**10**	**233**	**233**	92
**7**	**Columbus Blue Jackets**	**CE**	**82**	**41**	**31**	**10**	**226**	**230**	92
**8**	**Anaheim Ducks**	**PA**	**82**	**42**	**33**	**7**	**245**	**238**	91
8.5
9	Minnesota Wild	NW	82	40	33	9	219	200	89
10	Nashville Predators	CE	82	40	34	8	213	233	88
11	Edmonton Oilers	NW	82	38	35	9	234	248	85
12	Dallas Stars	PA	82	36	35	11	230	257	83
13	Phoenix Coyotes	PA	82	36	39	7	208	252	79
14	Los Angeles Kings	PA	82	34	37	11	207	234	79
15	Colorado Avalanche	NW	82	32	45	5	199	257	69

bold – qualified for playoffs, y – division winner, p – Presidents' Trophy winner
CE – Central Division, NW – Northwest Division, PA – Pacific Division

== Schedule and results ==
2008–09 Game Log

October: 4–4–0 (Home: 3–1–0; Road: 1–3–0)
#	Date	Visitor	Score	Home	OT	Decision	Attendance	Record	Pts	Recap
1	October 11	Columbus	1–3	Phoenix		Bryzgalov	17,125	1–0–0	2
2	October 12	Phoenix	4–2	Anaheim		Bryzgalov	17,174	2–0–0	4
3	October 15	Phoenix	1–4	Chicago		Bryzgalov	20,522	2–1–0	4
4	October 17	Phoenix	3–6	Ottawa		Bryzgalov	20,179	2–2–0	4
5	October 18	Phoenix	1–4	Montreal		Bryzgalov	21,273	2–3–0	4
6	October 23	Washington	1–2	Phoenix		Tellqvist	14,722	3–3–0	6
7	October 25	Calgary	4–1	Phoenix		Tellqvist	15,038	3–4–0	6
8	October 30	Pittsburgh	1–4	Phoenix		Bryzgalov	15,178	4–4–0	8

November: 6–7–2 (Home: 3–3–1; Road: 3–4–1)
#	Date	Visitor	Score	Home	OT	Decision	Attendance	Record	Pts	Recap
9	November 1	Minnesota	3–2	Phoenix		Bryzgalov	14,817	4–5–0	8
10	November 4	Phoenix	4–2	Calgary		Bryzgalov	19,289	5–5–0	10
11	November 6	Phoenix	0–1	Vancouver		Bryzgalov	18,630	5–6–0	10
12	November 8	Florida	1–4	Phoenix		Bryzgalov	14,807	6–6–0	12
13	November 9	San Jose	2–4	Phoenix		Bryzgalov	15,056	7–6–0	14
14	November 12	Phoenix	5–2	Columbus		Bryzgalov	11,350	8–6–0	16
15	November 13	Phoenix	0–4	Minnesota		Bryzgalov	18,568	8–7–0	16
16	November 15	Dallas	3–2	Phoenix		Bryzgalov	15,508	8–8–0	16
17	November 18	Chicago	3–2	Phoenix	SO	Bryzgalov	14,682	8–8–1	17
18	November 21	Phoenix	2–5	Carolina		Bryzgalov	14,848	8–9–1	17
19	November 22	Phoenix	3–4	Philadelphia	OT	Tellqvist	19,520	8–9–2	18
20	November 24	Phoenix	1–4	NY Rangers		Bryzgalov	18,200	8–10–2	18
21	November 26	Phoenix	3–2	Columbus		Tellqvist	14,569	9–10–2	20
22	November 28	Colorado	1–2	Phoenix		Tellqvist	14,031	10–10–2	22
23	November 29	San Jose	3–2	Phoenix		Tellqvist	14,007	10–11–2	22

December: 8–4–3 (Home: 6–1–1; Road: 2–3–2)
#	Date	Visitor	Score	Home	OT	Decision	Attendance	Record	Pts	Recap
24	December 2	Los Angeles	2–4	Phoenix		Tellqvist	11,473	11–11–2	24
25	December 4	Toronto	3–6	Phoenix		Bryzgalov	13,777	12–11–2	26
26	December 6	Phoenix	3–4	St. Louis		Bryzgalov	19,150	12–12–2	26
27	December 7	Phoenix	1–7	Chicago		Bryzgalov	21,217	12–13–2	26
28	December 10	Phoenix	5–3	Dallas		Bryzgalov	16,374	13–13–2	28
29	December 11	Minnesota	1–3	Phoenix		Bryzgalov	13,296	14–13–2	30
30	December 13	Detroit	5–4	Phoenix	SO	Bryzgalov	16,339	14–13–3	31
31	December 16	Phoenix	1–2	Dallas	OT	Bryzgalov	15,387	14–13–4	32
32	December 18	Nashville	1–2	Phoenix		Bryzgalov	14,193	15–13–4	34
33	December 20	Columbus	0–2	Phoenix		Bryzgalov	16,125	16–13–4	36
34	December 22	Phoenix	2–4	Edmonton		Tellqvist	16,839	16–14–4	36
35	December 23	Phoenix	4–5	Colorado	OT	Bryzgalov	14,625	16–14–5	37
36	December 26	Phoenix	2–1	Los Angeles		Bryzgalov	18,118	17–14–5	39
37	December 27	Los Angeles	4–0	Phoenix		Bryzgalov	16,199	17–15–5	39
38	December 31	Colorado	1–3	Phoenix		Tellqvist	15,008	18–15–5	41

January: 6–7–0 (Home: 4–3–0; Road: 2–4–0)
#	Date	Visitor	Score	Home	OT	Decision	Attendance	Record	Pts	Recap
39	January 2	NY Islanders	4–5	Phoenix		Tellqvist	14,547	19–15–5	43
40	January 4	Phoenix	0–2	Anaheim		Bryzgalov	16,878	19–16–5	43
41	January 6	Chicago	6–0	Phoenix		Tellqvist	14,651	19–17–5	43
42	January 8	Tampa Bay	2–3	Phoenix		Bryzgalov	13,736	20–17–5	45
43	January 10	Dallas	0–1	Phoenix	SO	Bryzgalov	14,557	21–17–5	47
44	January 13	Phoenix	3–6	Minnesota		Bryzgalov	18,568	21–18–5	47
45	January 15	Phoenix	4–1	Vancouver		Bryzgalov	18,630	22–18–5	49
46	January 17	Phoenix	4–3	Calgary		Bryzgalov	19,289	23–18–5	51
47	January 18	Phoenix	3–6	Edmonton		Bryzgalov	16,839	23–19–5	51
48	January 20	Detroit	3–6	Phoenix		Bryzgalov	16,368	24–19–5	53
49	January 27	Anaheim	7–3	Phoenix		Bryzgalov	15,383	24–20–5	53
50	January 29	Phoenix	0–2	San Jose		Bryzgalov	17,496	24–21–5	53
51	January 31	Buffalo	2–0	Phoenix		Bryzgalov	16,253	24–22–5	53

February: 3–9–0 (Home: 1–5–0; Road: 2–4–0)
#	Date	Visitor	Score	Home	OT	Decision	Attendance	Record	Pts	Recap
52	February 3	Phoenix	1–2	Nashville		Bryzgalov	13,195	24–23–5	53
53	February 4	Phoenix	4–5	Detroit		Bryzgalov	19,821	24–24–5	53
54	February 7	Carolina	7–2	Phoenix		Bryzgalov	15,229	24–25–5	53
55	February 11	Phoenix	1–0	Dallas		Bryzgalov	16,440	25–25–5	55
56	February 12	Vancouver	4–3	Phoenix		Bryzgalov	14,872	25–26–5	55
57	February 14	Calgary	7–5	Phoenix		Bryzgalov	16,981	25–27–5	55
58	February 16	Edmonton	3–1	Phoenix		Tellqvist	14,547	25–28–5	55
59	February 19	Atlanta	3–4	Phoenix	SO	Tellqvist	15,341	26–28–5	57
60	February 21	Phoenix	6–3	Los Angeles		Bryzgalov	17,177	27–28–5	59
61	February 24	Phoenix	1–2	St. Louis		Bryzgalov	17,512	27–29–5	59
62	February 26	Phoenix	1–4	Nashville		Bryzgalov	14,954	27–30–5	59
63	February 28	St. Louis	3–1	Phoenix		Bryzgalov	15,893	27–31–5	59

March: 5–6–2 (Home: 4–1–1; Road: 1–5–1)
#	Date	Visitor	Score	Home	OT	Decision	Attendance	Record	Pts	Recap
64	March 5	Phoenix	2–1	Boston		Bryzgalov	16,818	28–31–5	61
65	March 6	Phoenix	1–5	Buffalo		Bryzgalov	18,690	28–32–5	61
66	March 8	Phoenix	2–3	NY Islanders		Tordjman	13,413	28–33–5	61
67	March 10	Phoenix	2–3	Detroit	OT	Bryzgalov	20,066	28–33–6	62
68	March 12	Phoenix	2–5	New Jersey		Tordjman	14,578	28–34–6	62
69	March 14	Nashville	2–0	Phoenix		Bryzgalov	13,197	28–35–6	62
70	March 17	San Jose	3–4	Phoenix		Bryzgalov	15,563	29–35–6	64
71	March 19	Anaheim	3–2	Phoenix	SO	Bryzgalov	12,739	29–35–7	65
72	March 21	Vancouver	1–5	Phoenix		Bryzgalov	17,125	30–35–7	67
73	March 22	Phoenix	2–6	Anaheim		Bryzgalov	17,215	30–36–7	67
74	March 26	Edmonton	2–3	Phoenix		Bryzgalov	14,337	31–36–7	69
75	March 28	Phoenix	2–3	San Jose		Bryzgalov	17,496	31–37–7	69
76	March 30	Dallas	5–6	Phoenix	OT	Bryzgalov	13,831	32–37–7	71

April: 4–2–0 (Home: 2–1–0; Road: 2–1–0)
#	Date	Visitor	Score	Home	OT	Decision	Attendance	Record	Pts	Recap
77	April 1	Phoenix	3–0	Colorado		Montoya	13,437	33–37–7	73
78	April 2	Los Angeles	1–2	Phoenix		Montoya	13,177	34–37–7	75
79	April 4	Phoenix	1–6	Los Angeles		Montoya	18,118	34–38–7	75
80	April 7	St. Louis	5–1	Phoenix		Bryzgalov	13,761	34–39–7	75
81	April 9	Phoenix	4–1	San Jose		Montoya	17,496	35–39–7	77
82	April 11	Anaheim	4–5	Phoenix	SO	Bryzgalov	16,438	36–39–7	79

Legend: Win (2 points) Loss (0 points) Overtime/shootout loss (1 point)

== Playoffs ==
The Coyotes failed to make the playoffs for the sixth straight season. They last made the playoffs in 2002. This season, they were officially eliminated from playoff contention in mid-March.

== Player statistics ==
=== Skaters ===
Note: Pos = Position; GP = Games played; G = Goals; A = Assists; Pts = Points; PIM = Penalty minutes; +/- = Plus/minus; PPG = Power-play goals; SHG = Short-handed goals; GWG = Game-winning goals

Regular season

Player	GP	G	A	Pts	+/−	PIM
Shane Doan	82	31	42	73	+5	72
Olli Jokinen^{‡}	57	21	21	42	-5	49
Steven Reinprecht	73	14	27	41	0	20
Ed Jovanovski	82	9	27	36	-15	106
Peter Mueller	72	13	23	36	-7	24
Martin Hanzal	74	11	20	31	-4	40
Keith Yandle	69	4	26	30	-4	37
Mikkel Boedker	78	11	17	28	-6	18
Zbynek Michalek	82	6	21	27	-13	28
Enver Lisin	48	13	8	21	-13	24
Joakim Lindstrom	44	9	11	20	-6	28
Kyle Turris	63	8	12	20	-15	21
Matthew Lombardi^{†}	19	5	11	16	+2	14
Viktor Tikhonov	61	8	8	16	-3	20
Todd Fedoruk	72	6	7	13	-9	72
Scottie Upshall^{†}	19	8	5	13	+2	26
Derek Morris^{‡}	57	5	7	12	-13	24
Ken Klee^{†}	68	1	10	11	+9	24
Petr Prucha^{†}	19	2	8	10	+1	6
Daniel Carcillo^{‡}	54	3	7	10	-13	174
Kevin Porter	34	5	5	10	-2	4
David Hale	48	3	6	9	-11	36
Kurt Sauer	68	1	6	7	-1	36
Daniel Winnik	49	3	4	7	+1	63
Dmitri Kalinin^{†}	15	1	3	4	-2	6
Steven Goertzen	16	2	2	4	-2	24
Joel Perrault	7	2	1	3	+2	4
Nigel Dawes^{†}	12	0	2	2	-4	0
Brandon Prust^{†}	11	0	1	1	-4	29
Jeff Hoggan	4	0	1	1	-1	7
David Schlemko	3	0	1	1	-2	0
Brian McGrattan	5	0	0	0	-2	22
Garth Murray	10	0	0	0	-2	12
Alexander Nikulin	1	0	0	0	-1	0

=== Goaltenders ===
Note: Pos = Position;GP = Games played; Min, TOI = Minutes played; W = Wins; L = Losses; T,T/OT = Ties; OTL = Overtime losses; GA = Goals-against; GAA = Goals-against average; SO = Shutouts; SA = Shots against; SV = Shots saved; SV% = Save percentage;

Regular season

Player	GP	Min	W	L	OT	GA	GAA	SA	SV	Sv%	SO
Ilya Bryzgalov	65	3759	26	31	6	187	2.98	1994	1807	.906	3
Mikael Tellqvist^{‡}	15	797	9	6	1	38	2.86	408	370	.907	0
Al Montoya	5	259	3	1	0	9	2.08	120	111	.925	1
Josh Tordjman	2	117	0	2	0	8	4.08	62	54	.871	0

^{†}Denotes player spent time with another team before joining Coyotes. Stats reflect time with the Coyotes only.
^{‡}Traded mid-season.
Bold/italics denotes franchise record.

== Awards and records ==
=== Milestones ===
Regular season
Player	Milestone	Reached

== Transactions ==
=== Trades ===
June 20, 2008	To Phoenix Coyotes Olli Jokinen	To Florida Panthers Nick Boynton; Keith Ballard; 2nd-round pick in 2008 – Jared Staal
June 20, 2008	To Phoenix Coyotes 1st-round pick in 2008 – Viktor Tikhonov	To Anaheim Ducks 2nd-round pick in 2008 – Nicolas Deschamps; 2nd-round pick in 2008 – Eric O'Dell
October 9, 2008	To Phoenix Coyotes Future considerations	To Pittsburgh Penguins Michael Zigomanis
November 3, 2008	To Phoenix Coyotes Alexander Nikulin	To Ottawa Senators Drew Fata
November 25, 2008	To Phoenix Coyotes Wyatt Smith	To Tampa Bay Lightning Future considerations
December 3, 2008	To Phoenix Coyotes Joakim Lindstrom	To Dallas Stars Logan Stephenson
March 4, 2009	To Phoenix Coyotes Matthew Lombardi; Brandon Prust; 1st-round pick in 2009 or 2010^{1} – Brandon Gormley	To Calgary Flames Olli Jokinen; 3rd-round pick in 2009^{2} – Josh Birkholz
March 4, 2009	To Phoenix Coyotes 4th-round pick in 2010^{3} – Mark Macmillan	To Buffalo Sabres Mikael Tellqvist
March 4, 2009	To Phoenix Coyotes Scottie Upshall; 2nd-round pick in 2011 – Lucas Lessio	To Philadelphia Flyers Daniel Carcillo
March 4, 2009	To Phoenix Coyotes Nigel Dawes; Petr Prucha; Dmitri Kalinin	To New York Rangers Derek Morris

1. Phoenix Coyotes elected to use the pick in the latter.
2. Pick later traded to Calgary Flames.
3. Pick later traded to Montreal Canadiens

=== Free agents ===
Player	Former team	Contract terms

Player	New team
Radim Vrbata	Tampa Bay Lightning
Craig Weller	Minnesota Wild

=== Claimed from waivers ===
Player	Former team	Date claimed off waivers

== Draft picks ==
Phoenix's picks at the 2008 NHL entry draft in Ottawa, Ontario.

Round	#	Player	Position	Nationality	College/Junior/Club team (League)
1	8	Mikkel Boedker	(LW)	Denmark	Kitchener Rangers (OHL)
1	28 (from Dallas via Los Angeles via Anaheim)	Viktor Tikhonov	(RW)	Russia	Severstal Cherepovets (RSL)
2	49 (from Ottawa via Phoenix and Florida)	Jared Staal	(RW)	Canada	Sudbury Wolves (OHL)
3	69	Michael Stone	(D)	Canada	Calgary Hitmen (WHL)
3	76 (from Nashville)	Mathieu Brodeur	(D)	Canada	Cape Breton Screaming Eagles (QMJHL)
4	99	Colin Long	(C)	United States	Kelowna Rockets (WHL)
6	159	Brett Hextall	(C)	United States	Penticton Vees (BCHL)
7	189	Tim Billingsley	(D)	Canada	Mississauga St. Michael's Majors (OHL)

== See also ==
- 2008–09 NHL season

== Farm teams ==
San Antonio Rampage

The San Antonio Rampage are the Coyotes American Hockey League affiliate in 2008–09.

Arizona Sundogs

The Arizona Sundogs are the Coyotes affiliate in the CHL.
