= 2008–09 Dallas Stars season =

National Hockey League team season

2008–09 Dallas Stars
- Division: 3rd Pacific
- Conference: 12th Western
- 2008–09 record: 36–35–11
- Home record: 20–16–5
- Road record: 16–19–6
- Goals for: 230
- Goals against: 257

Team information
- General manager: Brett Hull and Les Jackson
- Coach: Dave Tippett
- Captain: Brenden Morrow
- Alternate captains: Mike Modano; Sergei Zubov
- Arena: American Airlines Center
- Average attendance: 17,681 (95.4%); Total: 724,911

Team leaders
- Goals: Loui Eriksson (36)
- Assists: Mike Ribeiro (56)
- Points: Mike Ribeiro (78)
- Penalty minutes: Krys Barch (84)
- Plus/minus: Stephane Robidas (12)
- Wins: Marty Turco (22)
- Goals against average: Marty Turco (2.98)

The 2008–09 Dallas Stars season was the 42nd season for the National Hockey League (NHL) franchise that was established on June 5, 1967. The Stars attempted to win the Stanley Cup for the second time in franchise history but the Stars would end the season missing the Stanley Cup playoffs for the first time since 2002 having missed the 2009 playoffs by eight points.

== Pre-season ==
The Stars finished the pre-season with a 1-5-1 record.

2008 Pre-season Game Log: 1–5–1 (Home: 1–2–1; Road: 0–3–0)
#	Date	Visitor	Score	Home	OT	Decision	Attendance	Record	Recap
1	September 23	Dallas	2–3	St. Louis		Stephan	10,796	0–1–0
2	September 25	Colorado	4–2	Dallas		Climie	16,634	0–2–0
3	September 27	St. Louis	3–4	Dallas		Turco	17,191	1–2–0
4	September 28	Dallas	3–4	Chicago		Stephan	18,425	1–3–0
5	October 1	Dallas	1–3	Colorado		Climie	?	1–4–0
6	October 2	Chicago	4–3	Dallas	SO	Turco	15,142	1–4–1
7	October 5	Edmonton	3–2	Dallas		Turco	16,835	1–5–1

== Regular season ==
The Stars finished the regular season having scored the fewest shorthanded goals in the NHL, with just two.

On February 6, 2009, the Stars defeated the New York Rangers at home by a score of 10–2. It was the first time that the Stars had scored 10 goals in a game since they defeated the San Jose Sharks at home by a score of 10–3 on November 28, 1992, when the franchise was still based in Minnesota.

On April 4, 2009, Trevor Daley scored just 16 seconds into the overtime period to give the Stars a 5–4 home win over the St. Louis Blues. It would prove to be the fastest overtime goal scored during the 2008–09 regular season.

=== Divisional standings ===
Pacific Division
		GP	W	L	OTL	GF	GA	Pts
**1**	**p – San Jose Sharks**	**82**	**53**	**18**	**11**	**257**	**204**	**117**
**2**	**Anaheim Ducks**	**82**	**42**	**33**	**7**	**245**	**238**	**91**
3	Dallas Stars	82	36	35	11	230	257	83
4	Phoenix Coyotes	82	36	39	7	208	252	79
5	Los Angeles Kings	82	34	37	11	207	234	79

Note: No. = Division rank, CR = Conference rank, W = Wins, L = Losses, T = Ties, GF = Goals For, GA = Goals Against, Pts = Points
Teams that qualified for the playoffs are highlighted in bold.

=== Conference standings ===
Western Conference
R		Div	GP	W	L	OTL	GF	GA	Pts
**1**	**p – San Jose Sharks**	**PA**	**82**	**53**	**18**	**11**	**257**	**204**	117
**2**	**y – Detroit Red Wings**	**CE**	**82**	**51**	**21**	**10**	**295**	**244**	112
**3**	**y – Vancouver Canucks**	**NW**	**82**	**45**	**27**	**10**	**246**	**220**	100
**4**	**Chicago Blackhawks**	**CE**	**82**	**46**	**24**	**12**	**264**	**216**	104
**5**	**Calgary Flames**	**NW**	**82**	**46**	**30**	**6**	**254**	**248**	98
**6**	**St. Louis Blues**	**CE**	**82**	**41**	**31**	**10**	**233**	**233**	92
**7**	**Columbus Blue Jackets**	**CE**	**82**	**41**	**31**	**10**	**226**	**230**	92
**8**	**Anaheim Ducks**	**PA**	**82**	**42**	**33**	**7**	**245**	**238**	91
8.5
9	Minnesota Wild	NW	82	40	33	9	219	200	89
10	Nashville Predators	CE	82	40	34	8	213	233	88
11	Edmonton Oilers	NW	82	38	35	9	234	248	85
12	Dallas Stars	PA	82	36	35	11	230	257	83
13	Phoenix Coyotes	PA	82	36	39	7	208	252	79
14	Los Angeles Kings	PA	82	34	37	11	207	234	79
15	Colorado Avalanche	NW	82	32	45	5	199	257	69

bold – qualified for playoffs, y – division winner, p – Presidents' Trophy winner
CE – Central Division, NW – Northwest Division, PA – Pacific Division

== Schedule and results ==
2008–09 Game Log

October: 4–5–2 (Home: 2–1–2; Road: 2–4–0)
#	Date	Visitor	Score	Home	OT	Decision	Attendance	Record	Pts	Recap
1	October 10	Columbus	5–4	Dallas	OT	Turco	18,532	0–0–1	1
2	October 11	Dallas	1–3	Nashville		Turco	17,113	0–1–1	1
3	October 15	Nashville	4–6	Dallas		Turco	16,899	1–1–1	3
4	October 16	Dallas	1–6	St. Louis		Turco	18,550	1–2–1	3
5	October 18	Colorado	5–4	Dallas		Turco	17,151	1–3–1	3
6	October 20	Dallas	2–1	NY Rangers		Turco	18,200	2–3–1	5
7	October 22	Dallas	0–5	New Jersey		Turco	12,101	2–4–1	5
8	October 23	Dallas	5–3	NY Islanders		Turco	10,183	3–4–1	7
9	October 25	Washington	6–5	Dallas	OT	Turco	18,532	3–4–2	8
10	October 29	Minnesota	2–4	Dallas		Stephan	18,431	4–4–2	10
11	October 31	Dallas	2–5	Chicago		Stephan	21,212	4–5–2	10

November: 4–6–2 (Home: 1–3–1; Road: 3–3–1)
#	Date	Visitor	Score	Home	OT	Decision	Attendance	Record	Pts	Recap
12	November 1	Dallas	1–5	Boston		Turco	14,576	4–6–2	10
13	November 7	Dallas	5–2	Anaheim		Turco	17,048	5–6–2	12
14	November 8	Dallas	1–2	San Jose		Turco	17,496	5–7–2	12
15	November 11	Dallas	2–3	Los Angeles	SO	Turco	13,823	5–7–3	13
16	November 13	Los Angeles	3–2	Dallas		Turco	17,675	5–8–3	13
17	November 15	Dallas	3–2	Phoenix		Turco	15,508	6–8–3	15
18	November 20	Chicago	6–3	Dallas		Turco	18,027	6–9–3	15
19	November 22	Anaheim	2–1	Dallas	SO	Turco	17,734	6–9–4	16
20	November 24	Dallas	3–4	Philadelphia		Turco	19,171	6–10–4	16
21	November 26	Dallas	4–3	Minnesota		Turco	18,568	7–10–4	18
22	November 28	San Jose	6–2	Dallas		Turco	18,532	7–11–4	18
23	November 30	Edmonton	3–4	Dallas		Turco	16,650	8–11–4	20

December: 8–4–1 (Home: 6–2–0; Road: 2–2–1)
#	Date	Visitor	Score	Home	OT	Decision	Attendance	Record	Pts	Recap
24	December 2	Dallas	3–1	Calgary		Turco	19,289	9–11–4	22
25	December 3	Dallas	2–5	Edmonton		Turco	16,839	9–12–4	22
26	December 5	Colorado	1–2	Dallas	SO	Turco	16,651	10–12–4	24
27	December 10	Phoenix	5–3	Dallas		Turco	16,374	10–13–4	24
28	December 12	Detroit	1–3	Dallas		Turco	18,532	11–13–4	26
29	December 13	Dallas	0–3	Nashville		Stephan	15,426	11–14–4	26
30	December 16	Phoenix	1–2	Dallas	OT	Turco	15,387	12–14–4	28
31	December 18	Columbus	5–6	Dallas	SO	Turco	16,281	13–14–4	30
32	December 20	Dallas	4–5	Ottawa	OT	Turco	19,486	13–14–5	31
33	December 23	Dallas	8–2	Toronto		Turco	19,269	14–14–5	33
34	December 27	Anaheim	3–4	Dallas	OT	Turco	18,532	15–14–5	35
35	December 29	San Jose	3–1	Dallas		Turco	18,532	15–15–5	35
36	December 31	New Jersey	2–4	Dallas		Turco	18,584	16–15–5	37

January: 7–3–2 (Home: 3–0–1; Road: 4–3–1)
#	Date	Visitor	Score	Home	OT	Decision	Attendance	Record	Pts	Recap
37	January 3	Dallas	1–4	Edmonton		Turco	16,839	16–16–5	37
38	January 4	Dallas	3–2	Vancouver	SO	Turco	18,630	17–16–5	39
39	January 8	Dallas	1–6	Detroit		Turco	20,066	17–17–5	39
40	January 10	Dallas	0–1	Phoenix	SO	Turco	14,557	17–17–6	40
41	January 12	Detroit	4–5	Dallas	OT	Turco	17,648	18–17–6	42
42	January 15	Buffalo	5–4	Dallas	SO	Turco	17,339	18–17–7	43
43	January 17	Los Angeles	2–3	Dallas	SO	Turco	18,532	19–17–7	45
44	January 19	Dallas	2–4	Tampa Bay		Turco	13,991	19–18–7	45
45	January 21	Dallas	4–1	Florida		Turco	11,200	20–18–7	47
46	January 27	Atlanta	0–2	Dallas		Turco	16,726	21–18–7	49
47	January 29	Dallas	4–2	Detroit		Turco	20,066	22–18–7	51
48	January 31	Dallas	7–3	Columbus		Turco	18,049	23–18–7	53

February: 6–7–0 (Home: 5–5–0; Road: 1–2–0)
#	Date	Visitor	Score	Home	OT	Decision	Attendance	Record	Pts	Recap
49	February 3	Calgary	1–3	Dallas		Turco	16,395	24–18–7	55
50	February 5	Dallas	2–3	Colorado		Turco	13,624	24–19–7	55
51	February 6	NY Rangers	2–10	Dallas		Turco	18,532	25–19–7	57
52	February 8	Nashville	1–4	Dallas		Turco	17,689	26–19–7	59
53	February 11	Phoenix	1–0	Dallas		Turco	16,440	26–20–7	59
54	February 13	Vancouver	1–2	Dallas		Turco	18,532	27–20–7	61
55	February 14	Dallas	2–6	Chicago		Turco	22,704	27–21–7	61
56	February 16	Dallas	3–2	Columbus	SO	Turco	15,006	28–21–7	63
57	February 19	Edmonton	2–4	Dallas		Turco	17,792	29–21–7	65
58	February 21	Chicago	3–1	Dallas		Turco	18,584	29–22–7	65
59	February 23	San Jose	1–0	Dallas		Turco	17,988	29–23–7	65
60	February 26	St. Louis	3–1	Dallas		Turco	17,603	29–24–7	65
61	February 28	Anaheim	4–3	Dallas		Turco	18,171	29–25–7	65

March: 5–8–3 (Home: 2–4–1; Road: 3–4–2)
#	Date	Visitor	Score	Home	OT	Decision	Attendance	Record	Pts	Recap
62	March 1	Pittsburgh	4–1	Dallas		Stephan	18,532	29–26–7	65
63	March 3	Dallas	4–1	San Jose		Turco	17,496	30–26–7	67
64	March 5	Dallas	4–5	Los Angeles	OT	Turco	17,430	30–26–8	68
65	March 6	Dallas	3–2	Anaheim		Turco	17,380	31–26–8	70
66	March 8	Montreal	3–1	Dallas		Turco	17,646	31–27–8	70
67	March 10	Dallas	2–5	St. Louis		Turco	17,708	31–28–8	70
68	March 12	Carolina	2–3	Dallas		Turco	16,788	32–28–8	72
69	March 14	Minnesota	2–3	Dallas	OT	Turco	18,584	33–28–8	74
70	March 17	Dallas	2–4	Vancouver		Turco	18,630	33–29–8	74
71	March 18	Dallas	1–2	Calgary		Turco	19,289	33–30–8	74
72	March 21	Dallas	2–5	San Jose		Turco	17,496	33–31–8	74
73	March 24	Vancouver	5–2	Dallas		Turco	17,276	33–32–8	74
74	March 26	Los Angeles	1–0	Dallas	SO	Turco	16,908	33–32–9	75
75	March 28	Florida	6–3	Dallas		Turco	18,532	33–33–9	75
76	March 30	Dallas	5–6	Phoenix	OT	Stephan	13,831	33–33–10	76
77	March 31	Dallas	3–2	Los Angeles		Turco	17,648	34–33–10	78

April: 2–2–1 (Home: 1–1–0; Road: 1–1–1)
#	Date	Visitor	Score	Home	OT	Decision	Attendance	Record	Pts	Recap
78	April 2	Calgary	2–1	Dallas		Turco	17,106	34–34–10	78
79	April 4	St. Louis	4–5	Dallas	OT	Climie	18,532	35–34–10	80
80	April 7	Dallas	1–3	Minnesota		Climie	18,568	35–35–10	82
81	April 9	Dallas	3–2	Colorado	SO	Climie	13,822	36–35–10	84
82	April 10	Dallas	3–4	Anaheim	SO	Turco	17,531	36–35–11	85

Legend: Win (2 points) Loss (0 points) Overtime/shootout loss (1 point)

== Player statistics ==
=== Skaters ===
Note: Pos = Position; GP = Games played; G = Goals; A = Assists; Pts = Points; PIM = Penalty minutes; +/- = Plus/minus; PPG = Power-play goals; SHG = Short-handed goals; GWG = Game-winning goals

Regular season

Player	GP	G	A	Pts	+/−	PIM
Mike Ribeiro	82	22	56	78	-4	52
Loui Eriksson	82	36	27	63	+14	14
Brad Richards	56	16	32	48	-4	6
Mike Modano	80	15	31	46	-13	46
Steve Ott	64	19	27	46	+3	135
James Neal	77	24	13	37	-11	51
Matt Niskanen	80	6	29	35	-11	52
Fabian Brunnstrom	55	17	12	29	-8	8
Stephane Robidas	72	3	23	26	+10	76
Trevor Daley	75	7	18	25	+2	73
Jere Lehtinen	48	8	16	24	+1	8
Brenden Morrow	18	5	10	15	-4	49
Mark Parrish	44	8	5	13	-3	18
Darryl Sydor^{†}	65	2	11	13	-2	16
Chris Conner	38	3	10	13	-5	10
Nicklas Grossmann	81	2	10	12	-8	51
Toby Petersen	57	4	7	11	+1	14
Sean Avery^{‡}	23	3	7	10	+2	77
Brendan Morrison^{†}	19	6	3	9	+3	16
Brian Sutherby^{†}	42	5	4	9	-5	52
Krys Barch	72	4	5	9	+1	133
Landon Wilson	27	2	6	8	+5	21
Joel Lundqvist	43	1	5	6	-9	20
Andrew Hutchinson^{†}	38	2	3	5	-4	12
B. J. Crombeen^{‡}	15	1	4	5	-1	26
Sergei Zubov	10	0	4	4	-4	0
Mark Fistric	36	0	4	4	-1	42
Philippe Boucher^{‡}	16	0	3	3	-4	15
Tom Wandell	14	1	2	3	-1	4
Steve Begin^{†}	20	1	1	2	-1	15
Garrett Stafford	3	0	2	2	0	0
Ivan Vishnevskiy	3	0	2	2	+1	2
Doug Janik^{‡}	13	0	1	1	-2	2
Raymond Sawada	5	1	0	1	-1	0
Dan Jancevski	3	0	0	0	0	0

=== Goaltenders ===
Note: Pos = Position;GP = Games played; Min, TOI = Minutes played; W = Wins; L = Losses; T,T/OT = Ties; OTL = Overtime losses; GA = Goals-against; GAA = Goals-against average; SO = Shutouts; SA = Shots against; SV = Shots saved; SV% = Save percentage;

Regular season

Player	GP	Min	W	L	OT	GA	GAA	SA	SV	Sv%	SO
Marty Turco	74	4327	33	31	10	203	2.81	1993	1790	.898	3
Tobias Stephan	10	437	1	3	1	27	3.70	208	181	.870	0
Matt Climie	3	185	2	1	0	9	2.92	85	76	.894	0
Brent Krahn	1	20	0	0	0	3	9.00	9	6	.667	0

^{†}Denotes player spent time with another team before joining Stars. Stats reflect player's season totals.
^{‡}Traded mid-season
Bold/italics denotes franchise record

== Awards and records ==
=== Milestones ===
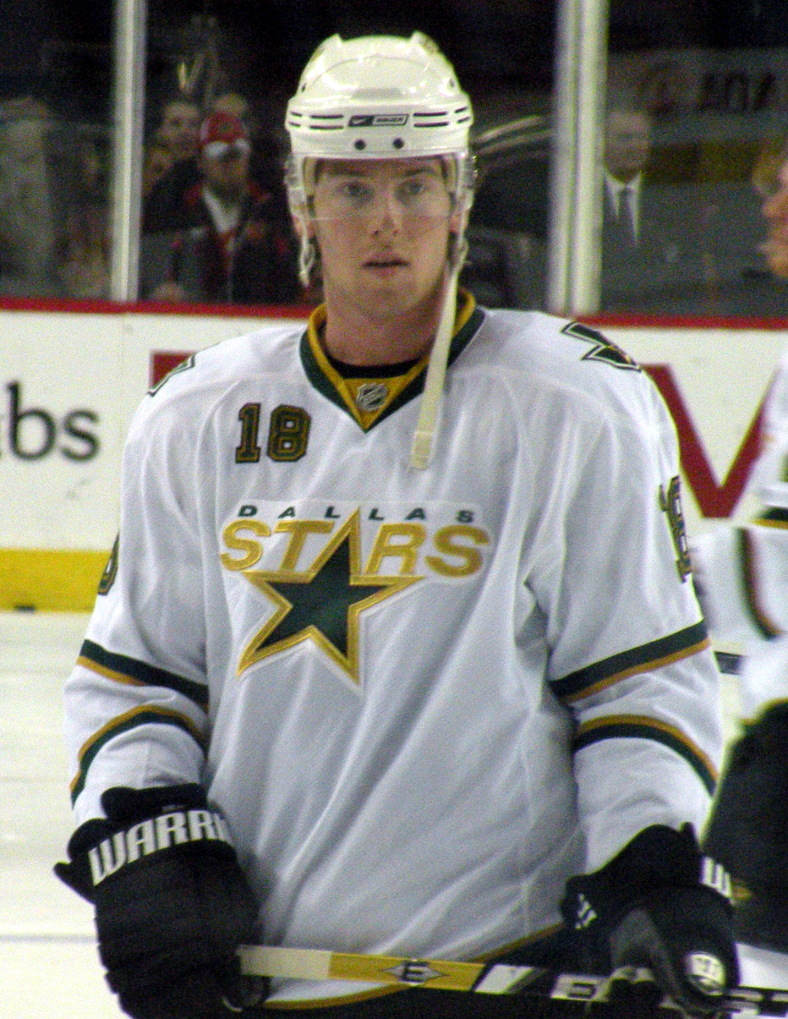
Stars forward James Neal

Regular Season
Player	Milestone	Reached
James Neal	1st NHL Game; 1st NHL Goal; 1st NHL Point	October 10, 2008
Fabian Brunnstrom	1st NHL Game; 1st NHL Goal; 1st NHL Point; 1st NHL Hat Trick	October 15, 2008
James Neal	1st NHL Assist	October 15, 2008
Fabian Brunnstrom	1st NHL Assist	October 20, 2008
Mike Ribeiro	300th NHL Point	October 23, 2008
B. J. Crombeen	1st NHL Goal	October 25, 2008
Joel Lundqvist	100th NHL Game	October 25, 2008
Stephane Robidas	500th NHL Game	October 31, 2008

== Transactions ==
=== Trades ===
Date	Details
November 16, 2008	To Pittsburgh Penguins Philippe Boucher	To Dallas Stars Darryl Sydor
November 30, 2008	To Tampa Bay Lightning Lauri Tukonen	To Dallas Stars Andrew Hutchinson
December 14, 2008	To Anaheim Ducks David McIntyre; Conditional pick in 2009^{1}	To Dallas Stars Brian Sutherby
February 26, 2009	To Montreal Canadiens Doug Janik	To Dallas Stars Steve Begin

1. Condition not satisfied.

=== Free agents ===
Player	Former team	Contract Terms
Sean Avery	New York Rangers	4 years, $15.5 million

Player	New team
Niklas Hagman	Toronto Maple Leafs
Nolan Baumgartner	Vancouver Canucks
Antti Miettinen	Minnesota Wild
Brad Winchester	St. Louis Blues
Byrce Lampman	Amur Khabarovsk
Johan Holmqvist	Frölunda HC
Lauri Tukonen	Ilves

=== Waivers ===
Player	Former team	New team	Date claimed off waivers
Doug Janik	Chicago Blackhawks	Dallas Stars	October 2
Sean Avery	Dallas Stars	New York Rangers	March 3, 2009
Brendan Morrison	Anaheim Ducks	Dallas Stars	March 4, 2009

=== Retired ===
Player	Date retired
Mattias Norstrom	June 10, 2008
Stu Barnes	August 8, 2008

== Draft picks ==
The Stars' picks at the 2008 NHL entry draft in Ottawa, Ontario.

Round	#	Player	Position	Nationality	College/Junior/Club team (League)
2	59	Tyler Beskorowany	(G)	Canada	Owen Sound Attack (OHL)
3	89	Scott Winkler	(C)	Norway	Cedar Rapids RoughRiders (USHL)
5	149	Philip Larsen	(D)	Denmark	Frölunda HC (Elitserien)
6	176 (from Montreal)	Matthew Tassone	(C)	Canada	Swift Current Broncos (WHL)
7	209	Mike Bergin	(D)	Canada	Smiths Falls Bears (CJHL)

== See also ==
- 2008–09 NHL season

== Farm teams ==
In 2008, the Stars ended their affiliation with the American Hockey League (AHL)'s Iowa Stars as their primary minor league affiliate, expecting to announce the formation of a new minor league expansion team, the Texas Stars, at the beginning of the 2009–10 season. The Texas Stars will be based in Cedar Park, Texas, just three hours driving time from the metroplex. The Stars' minor league contract players are currently dispersed among four different teams in the AHL and ECHL.
