= 2008–09 Colorado Avalanche season =

National Hockey League team season

2008–09 Colorado Avalanche
- Division: 5th Northwest
- Conference: 15th Western
- 2008–09 record: 32–45–5
- Home record: 18–21–2
- Road record: 14–24–3
- Goals for: 199
- Goals against: 257

Team information
- General manager: Francois Giguere
- Coach: Tony Granato
- Captain: Joe Sakic
- Alternate captains: Adam Foote; Ian Laperriere; Milan Hejduk; Ryan Smyth
- Arena: Pepsi Center
- Average attendance: 15,429

Team leaders
- Goals: Milan Hejduk (27)
- Assists: Ryan Smyth (33)
- Points: Milan Hejduk and Ryan Smyth (59)
- Penalty minutes: Ian Laperriere (163)
- Plus/minus: Ben Guite (+2)
- Wins: Peter Budaj (20)
- Goals against average: Peter Budaj (2.86)

The 2008–09 Colorado Avalanche season was the franchise's 37th season, 30th in the National Hockey League, and 14th as the Colorado Avalanche.

The team finished last place in its division and conference for the first time since 1991–92 when they were still the Quebec Nordiques, and did not qualify for the 2009 Stanley Cup playoffs.

== Regular season ==
The Avalanche struggled offensively, finishing 30th overall in scoring with just 192 goals (excluding 7 shootout-winning goals). They were also shut out a league-high 12 times, tied with the Los Angeles Kings, setting a franchise record.

=== Divisional standings ===
Northwest Division
		GP	W	L	OTL	GF	GA	Pts
**1**	**y – Vancouver Canucks**	**82**	**45**	**27**	**10**	**246**	**220**	**100**
**2**	**Calgary Flames**	**82**	**46**	**30**	**6**	**254**	**248**	**98**
3	Minnesota Wild	82	40	33	9	219	200	**89**
4	Edmonton Oilers	82	38	35	9	234	248	**85**
5	Colorado Avalanche	82	32	45	5	199	257	**69**

=== Conference standings ===
Western Conference
R		Div	GP	W	L	OTL	GF	GA	Pts
**1**	**p – San Jose Sharks**	**PA**	**82**	**53**	**18**	**11**	**257**	**204**	117
**2**	**y – Detroit Red Wings**	**CE**	**82**	**51**	**21**	**10**	**295**	**244**	112
**3**	**y – Vancouver Canucks**	**NW**	**82**	**45**	**27**	**10**	**246**	**220**	100
**4**	**Chicago Blackhawks**	**CE**	**82**	**46**	**24**	**12**	**264**	**216**	104
**5**	**Calgary Flames**	**NW**	**82**	**46**	**30**	**6**	**254**	**248**	98
**6**	**St. Louis Blues**	**CE**	**82**	**41**	**31**	**10**	**233**	**233**	92
**7**	**Columbus Blue Jackets**	**CE**	**82**	**41**	**31**	**10**	**226**	**230**	92
**8**	**Anaheim Ducks**	**PA**	**82**	**42**	**33**	**7**	**245**	**238**	91
8.5
9	Minnesota Wild	NW	82	40	33	9	219	200	89
10	Nashville Predators	CE	82	40	34	8	213	233	88
11	Edmonton Oilers	NW	82	38	35	9	234	248	85
12	Dallas Stars	PA	82	36	35	11	230	257	83
13	Phoenix Coyotes	PA	82	36	39	7	208	252	79
14	Los Angeles Kings	PA	82	34	37	11	207	234	79
15	Colorado Avalanche	NW	82	32	45	5	199	257	69

bold – qualified for playoffs, y – division winner, p – Presidents' Trophy winner
CE – Central Division, NW – Northwest Division, PA – Pacific Division

== Schedule and results ==
- Green background indicates win (2 points).
- Red background indicates regulation loss (0 points).
- White background indicates overtime/shootout loss (1 point).

2008–09 Game log
October: 5–5–0 (Home: 3–2–0; Road: 2–3–0)

#	Date	Opponent	Score	OT/SO	Decision	Attendance	Record	Pts
1	October 9	Boston Bruins	5 - 4		Budaj	18,007	0-1-0	0
2	October 12	@ Edmonton Oilers	3 - 2		Budaj	16,839	0-2-0	0
3	October 14	@ Calgary Flames	5 - 4		Budaj	19,289	0-3-0	0
4	October 16	Philadelphia Flyers	5 - 2		Raycroft	18,007	1-3-0	2
5	October 18	@ Dallas Stars	5 - 4		Raycroft	17,151	2-3-0	4
6	October 20	@ Los Angeles Kings	4 - 3		Budaj	13,891	3-3-0	6
7	October 23	Edmonton Oilers	4 - 1		Budaj	14,898	4-3-0	8
8	October 25	Buffalo Sabres	2 - 1	SO (3-2)	Budaj	18,007	5-3-0	10
9	October 28	@ Calgary Flames	3 - 0		Budaj	19,289	5-4-0	10
10	October 30	Columbus Blue Jackets	4 - 2		Raycroft	14,945	5-5-0	10

November: 6–7–0 (Home: 3–5–0; Road: 3–2–0)

#	Date	Opponent	Score	OT/SO	Decision	Attendance	Record	Pts
11	November 2	San Jose Sharks	5 - 3		Budaj	15,452	5-6-0	10
12	November 3	@ Chicago Blackhawks	6 - 2		Budaj	21,142	5-7-0	10
13	November 6	Minnesota Wild	3 - 1		Budaj	14,562	5-8-0	10
14	November 8	Nashville Predators	1 - 0		Budaj	18,007	6-8-0	12
15	November 12	@ Vancouver Canucks	2 - 1	SO (2-1)	Budaj	18,630	7-8-0	14
16	November 15	@ Edmonton Oilers	3 - 2	SO (2-1)	Budaj	16,839	8-8-0	16
17	November 18	@ Calgary Flames	4 - 1		Budaj	19,289	8-9-0	16
18	November 20	Calgary Flames	1 - 0		Budaj	14,536	8-10-0	16
19	November 22	@ Los Angeles Kings	4 - 3	SO (2-0)	Budaj	18,118	9-10-0	18
20	November 24	Anaheim Ducks	4 - 1		Budaj	16,632	9-11-0	18
21	November 26	St. Louis Blues	3 - 1		Budaj	14,568	10-11-0	20
22	November 28	Phoenix Coyotes	2 - 1		Budaj	14,031	10-12-0	20
23	November 29	Tampa Bay Lightning	4 - 3		Raycroft	18,007	11-12-0	22

December: 8–5–1 (Home: 5–1–0; Road: 3–4–1)

#	Date	Opponent	Score	OT/SO	Decision	Attendance	Record	Pts
24	December 1	@ Minnesota Wild	6 - 5		Budaj	18,568	12-12-0	24
25	December 4	@ Nashville Predators	3 - 2		Budaj	12,717	12-13-0	24
26	December 5	@ Dallas Stars	2 - 1	SO (2-1)	Budaj	16,651	12-13-1	25
27	December 7	Vancouver Canucks	5 - 4	SO (3-1)	Budaj	13,411	13-13-1	27
28	December 9	Los Angeles Kings	6 - 1		Budaj	14,122	14-13-1	29
29	December 12	Chicago Blackhawks	4 - 3		Budaj	17,569	14-14-1	29
30	December 15	@ Detroit Red Wings	3 - 2		Raycroft	19,154	15-14-1	31
31	December 16	@ Philadelphia Flyers	5 - 2		Budaj	19,219	15-15-1	31
32	December 18	@ Tampa Bay Lightning	2 - 1	SO (1-0)	Raycroft	16,333	16-15-1	33
33	December 21	@ Florida Panthers	3 - 0		Budaj	16,132	16-16-1	33
34	December 23	Phoenix Coyotes	5 - 4	OT	Raycroft	14,625	17-16-1	35
35	December 27	Detroit Red Wings	4 - 3	SO (1-0)	Budaj	18,007	18-16-1	37
36	December 29	Nashville Predators	5 - 1		Budaj	15,643	19-16-1	39
37	December 31	@ Phoenix Coyotes	3 - 1		Budaj	15,008	19-17-1	39

January: 4–9–0 (Home: 3–7–0; Road: 1–2–0)

#	Date	Opponent	Score	OT/SO	Decision	Attendance	Record	Pts
38	January 2	Columbus Blue Jackets	6 - 1		Budaj	14,482	19-18-1	39
39	January 4	Minnesota Wild	2 - 0		Budaj	14,125	19-19-1	39
40	January 6	@ Nashville Predators	2 - 1		Raycroft	13,598	20-19-1	41
41	January 8	Chicago Blackhawks	2 - 1		Raycroft	15,174	21-19-1	43
42	January 10	Pittsburgh Penguins	5 - 3		Raycroft	17,908	22-19-1	45
43	January 13	@ Columbus Blue Jackets	4 - 3		Raycroft	15,343	22-20-1	45
44	January 15	@ St. Louis Blues	5 - 2		Budaj	17,545	22-21-1	45
45	January 16	Edmonton Oilers	3 - 2		Raycroft	15,681	22-22-1	45
46	January 18	Calgary Flames	6 - 2		Budaj	16,113	23-22-1	47
47	January 21	Los Angeles Kings	6 - 5		Raycroft	13,289	23-23-1	47
48	January 27	San Jose Sharks	3 - 0		Raycroft	14,592	23-24-1	47
49	January 29	Toronto Maple Leafs	7 - 4		Raycroft	15,216	23-25-1	47
50	January 31	Anaheim Ducks	4 - 3		Budaj	17,652	23-26-1	47

February: 5–8–0 (Home: 3–1–0; Road: 2–7–0)

#	Date	Opponent	Score	OT/SO	Decision	Attendance	Record	Pts
51	February 2	Calgary Flames	4 - 3		Budaj	13,409	24-26-1	49
52	February 5	Dallas Stars	3 - 2		Budaj	13,624	25-26-1	51
53	February 7	@ St. Louis Blues	4 - 1		Budaj	19,250	25-27-1	51
54	February 10	@ Columbus Blue Jackets	3 - 0		Budaj	14,506	25-28-1	51
55	February 11	@ Minnesota Wild	3 - 2		Raycroft	18,568	25-29-1	51
56	February 13	Montreal Canadiens	4 - 2		Budaj	17,514	25-30-1	51
57	February 15	@ Detroit Red Wings	6 - 5	SO (2-1)	Raycroft	20,066	26-30-1	53
58	February 17	Ottawa Senators	3 - 2	OT	Raycroft	15,237	27-30-1	55
59	February 20	@ Washington Capitals	4 - 1		Raycroft	18,277	28-30-1	57
60	February 22	@ Carolina Hurricanes	5 - 2		Raycroft	18,680	28-31-1	57
61	February 24	@ Atlanta Thrashers	4 - 3		Budaj	12,101	28-32-1	57
62	February 26	@ New Jersey Devils	4 - 0		Raycroft	16,107	28-33-1	57
63	February 28	@ New York Rangers	6 - 1		Budaj	18,200	28-34-1	57

March: 3–9–1 (Home: 1–5–0; Road: 2–4–1)

#	Date	Opponent	Score	OT/SO	Decision	Attendance	Record	Pts
64	March 2	@ New York Islanders	4 - 2		Raycroft	11,298	28-35-1	57
65	March 4	Detroit Red Wings	3 - 2		Raycroft	18,007	28-36-1	57
66	March 8	@ Chicago Blackhawks	5 - 1		Budaj	22,121	29-36-1	59
67	March 10	Atlanta Thrashers	3 - 0		Budaj	13,608	29-37-1	59
68	March 12	Minnesota Wild	2 - 1	SO (2-0)	Budaj	14,213	30-37-1	61
69	March 14	@ Edmonton Oilers	3 - 2	OT	Budaj	16,839	31-37-1	63
70	March 15	@ Vancouver Canucks	4 - 2		Raycroft	18,630	31-38-1	63
71	March 17	@ Minnesota Wild	3 - 2	SO (2-1)	Budaj	18,568	31-38-2	64
72	March 19	Edmonton Oilers	8 - 1		Budaj	13,612	31-39-2	64
73	March 22	@ San Jose Sharks	3 - 1		Raycroft	17,496	31-40-2	64
74	March 25	Anaheim Ducks	7 - 2		Budaj	16,279	31-41-2	64
75	March 27	Vancouver Canucks	4 - 1		Raycroft	16,177	31-42-2	64
76	March 29	@ Anaheim Ducks	4 - 1		Budaj	17,182	31-43-2	64

April: 1–2–3 (Home: 0–2–2; Road: 1–0–1)

#	Date	Opponent	Score	OT/SO	Decision	Attendance	Record	Pts
77	April 1	Phoenix Coyotes	3 - 0		Raycroft	13,437	31-44-2	64
78	April 5	@ Vancouver Canucks	4 - 1		Budaj	18,630	32-44-2	66
79	April 7	@ San Jose Sharks	1 - 0	SO (1-0)	Budaj	17,496	32-44-3	67
80	April 9	Dallas Stars	3 - 2	SO (3-2)	Budaj	13,822	32-44-4	68
81	April 11	Vancouver Canucks	1 - 0	OT	Budaj	13,397	32-44-5	69
82	April 12	St. Louis Blues	1 - 0		Raycroft	13,661	32-45-5	69

== Playoffs ==
The Colorado Avalanche failed to qualify for the 2009 NHL Playoffs.

== Player statistics ==
=== Skaters ===
Note: Pos = Position; GP = Games played; G = Goals; A = Assists; Pts = Points; PIM = Penalty minutes; +/- = Plus/minus; PPG = Power-play goals; SHG = Short-handed goals; GWG = Game-winning goals

Regular season

Player	GP	G	A	Pts	+/−	PIM
Milan Hejduk	82	27	32	59	-19	16
Ryan Smyth	77	26	33	59	-15	62
Wojtek Wolski	78	14	28	42	-13	28
John-Michael Liles	75	12	27	39	-19	31
Paul Stastny	45	11	25	36	-9	22
Marek Svatos	69	14	20	34	-6	34
Tyler Arnason	71	5	17	22	-16	14
Ruslan Salei	70	4	17	21	-4	72
T. J. Hensick	61	4	17	21	-7	14
Jordan Leopold^{‡}	64	6	14	20	-10	18
Cody McLeod	79	15	5	20	-11	162
Ian Laperriere	74	7	12	19	0	163
Chris Stewart	53	11	8	19	-18	54
Darcy Tucker	63	8	8	16	-13	67
David Jones	40	8	5	13	-8	8
Brett Clark	76	2	10	12	-16	32
Joe Sakic	15	2	10	12	-6	6
Cody McCormick	55	1	11	12	-5	92
Ben Guite	50	5	7	12	+2	30
Scott Hannan	81	1	9	10	-21	26
Adam Foote	42	1	6	7	-12	30
Brian Willsie	42	1	3	4	-6	14
Daniel Tjarnqvist	37	2	2	4	+1	8
TJ Galiardi	11	3	1	4	-4	6
Raymond Macias	6	0	1	1	0	0
Lawrence Nycholat^{†}	5	0	0	0	-2	0
Philippe Dupuis	8	0	0	0	-1	4
Aaron MacKenzie	5	0	0	0	+1	0
Michael Vernace	12	0	0	0	-5	8
Kyle Cumiskey	6	0	0	0	-2	0
Chris Durno	2	0	0	0	0	0
Matt Hendricks	4	0	0	0	+1	13
Wes O'Neill	3	0	0	0	-2	4
Derek Peltier	11	0	0	0	-4	2
Per Ledin	3	0	0	0	-1	2

=== Goaltenders ===
Note: Pos = Position;GP = Games played; Min, TOI = Minutes played; W = Wins; L = Losses; T,T/OT = Ties; OTL = Overtime losses; GA = Goals-against; GAA = Goals-against average; SO = Shutouts; SA = Shots against; SV = Shots saved; SV% = Save percentage;

Regular season

Player	GP	Min	W	L	OT	GA	GAA	SA	SV	Sv%	SO
Peter Budaj	56	3231	20	29	5	154	2.86	1531	1377	.899	2
Andrew Raycroft	31	1722	12	16	0	90	3.14	836	746	.892	0

^{†}Denotes player spent time with another team before joining Avalanche. Stats reflect time with the Avalanche only.
^{‡}Traded mid-season

== Awards and records ==
=== Milestones ===
Regular season
Player	Milestone	Reached
Milan Hejduk	600th NHL point	October 9, 2008
Adam Foote	1,000th NHL game	October 12, 2008
Paul Stastny	100th NHL assist	October 14, 2008
Andrew Raycroft	200th NHL appearance	October 16, 2008
Marek Svatos	200th NHL game	October 25, 2008
Scott Hannan	600th NHL game	October 30, 2008
Darcy Tucker	200th NHL goal	November 8, 2008
Ryan Smyth	300th NHL goal	January 18, 2009
Milan Hejduk	300th NHL goal	January 18, 2009
Ian Laperriere	1000th NHL game	April 10, 2009

== Transactions ==
=== Trades ===
March 4, 2009	To Colorado Avalanche----Lawrence Nycholat; Ryan Wilson; Montreal's second-round pick (previously acquired) in 2009 draft	To Calgary Flames ----Jordan Leopold

=== Free agents ===
Player	Former team	Contract terms
Andrew Raycroft	Toronto Maple Leafs	1 year, $800,000
Darcy Tucker	Toronto Maple Leafs	2 year, $4.5 million

Player	New team
Jeff Finger	Toronto Maple Leafs
Jose Theodore	Washington Capitals
Kurt Sauer	Phoenix Coyotes
Andrew Brunette	Minnesota Wild

=== Claimed from waivers ===
Player	Former team	Date claimed off waivers
Jesse Boulerice	Edmonton Oilers	November 21, 2008

== Draft picks ==
Colorado's picks at the 2008 NHL entry draft in Ottawa • Ontario.

Round	#	Player	Position	Nationality	College/junior/club team (league)
2	50	Cameron Gaunce	Defenseman	Canada	Mississauga St. Michael's Majors (OHL)
2	61	Peter Delmas	Goalie	Canada	Lewiston Maineiacs (QMJHL)
4	110	Kelsey Tessier	Center	Canada	Quebec Remparts (QMJHL)
5	140	Mark Olver	Center	Canada	Northern Michigan U. (CCHA)
6	167	Joel Chouinard	Defenseman	Canada	Victoriaville Tigres (QMJHL)
6	170	Jonas Holos	Defenseman	Norway	Sparta Warriors (GET-ligaen)
7	200	Nathan Condon	Center	United States	Wausau (HIGH-WI)

== See also ==
- 2008–09 NHL season

== Farm teams ==
=== Lake Erie Monsters ===
The Avalanche's American Hockey League affiliate was the Lake Erie Monsters, based in Cleveland, Ohio.

=== Johnstown Chiefs ===
The Johnstown Chiefs of the ECHL were the Avalanche's second-tier affiliate.
