= 2008–09 San Jose Sharks season =

National Hockey League team season

2008–09 San Jose Sharks
- Presidents' Trophy winners
- Pacific Division champions
- Division: 1st Pacific
- Conference: 1st Western
- 2008–09 record: 53–18–11
- Home record: 32–5–4
- Road record: 21–13–7
- Goals for: 257
- Goals against: 204

Team information
- General manager: Doug Wilson
- Coach: Todd McLellan
- Captain: Patrick Marleau
- Alternate captains: Mike Grier; Joe Thornton
- Arena: HP Pavilion at San Jose
- Average attendance: 17,488 (100%)

Team leaders
- Goals: Patrick Marleau (38)
- Assists: Joe Thornton (61)
- Points: Joe Thornton (86)
- Penalty minutes: Jody Shelley (116)
- Plus/minus: Devin Setoguchi; Patrick Marleau; Joe Thornton (+16)
- Wins: Evgeni Nabokov (41)
- Goals against average: Brian Boucher (2.18)

The 2008–09 San Jose Sharks season was the Sharks' 18th season in the National Hockey League (NHL).

== Season events ==
=== Pre-season ===
On June 12, the San Jose Sharks named Todd McLellan their new head coach.

The Sharks traded for defensemen Dan Boyle and Brad Lukowich from the Tampa Bay Lightning and signed Rob Blake.

Former Shark Jeff Friesen tried out for a spot on the team, but the team released him before the season opener.

Kyle McLaren was placed on waivers, just before the regular season began. He was not claimed by any NHL team and was thus sent down to the Sharks' American Hockey League (AHL) affiliate, the Worcester Sharks, to receive more playing time and so that the Sharks could play under the salary cap.

== Standings ==
=== Divisional standings ===
Pacific Division
		GP	W	L	OTL	GF	GA	Pts
**1**	**p – San Jose Sharks**	**82**	**53**	**18**	**11**	**257**	**204**	**117**
**2**	**Anaheim Ducks**	**82**	**42**	**33**	**7**	**245**	**238**	**91**
3	Dallas Stars	82	36	35	11	230	257	83
4	Phoenix Coyotes	82	36	39	7	208	252	79
5	Los Angeles Kings	82	34	37	11	207	234	79

Note: No. = Division rank, CR = Conference rank, W = Wins, L = Losses, T = Ties, GF = Goals For, GA = Goals Against, Pts = Points
Teams that qualified for the playoffs are highlighted in bold.

=== Conference standings ===
Western Conference
R		Div	GP	W	L	OTL	GF	GA	Pts
**1**	**p – San Jose Sharks**	**PA**	**82**	**53**	**18**	**11**	**257**	**204**	117
**2**	**y – Detroit Red Wings**	**CE**	**82**	**51**	**21**	**10**	**295**	**244**	112
**3**	**y – Vancouver Canucks**	**NW**	**82**	**45**	**27**	**10**	**246**	**220**	100
**4**	**Chicago Blackhawks**	**CE**	**82**	**46**	**24**	**12**	**264**	**216**	104
**5**	**Calgary Flames**	**NW**	**82**	**46**	**30**	**6**	**254**	**248**	98
**6**	**St. Louis Blues**	**CE**	**82**	**41**	**31**	**10**	**233**	**233**	92
**7**	**Columbus Blue Jackets**	**CE**	**82**	**41**	**31**	**10**	**226**	**230**	92
**8**	**Anaheim Ducks**	**PA**	**82**	**42**	**33**	**7**	**245**	**238**	91
8.5
9	Minnesota Wild	NW	82	40	33	9	219	200	89
10	Nashville Predators	CE	82	40	34	8	213	233	88
11	Edmonton Oilers	NW	82	38	35	9	234	248	85
12	Dallas Stars	PA	82	36	35	11	230	257	83
13	Phoenix Coyotes	PA	82	36	39	7	208	252	79
14	Los Angeles Kings	PA	82	34	37	11	207	234	79
15	Colorado Avalanche	NW	82	32	45	5	199	257	69

bold – qualified for playoffs, y – division winner, p – Presidents' Trophy winner
CE – Central Division, NW – Northwest Division, PA – Pacific Division

== Schedule and results ==
- Green background indicates win (2 points).
- Red background indicates regulation loss (0 points).
- White background indicates overtime/shootout loss (1 point).

2008–09 Game Log

October: 9–2–0 (Home: 6–0–0; Road: 3–2–0)
#	Date	Visitor	Score	Home	OT	Decision	Attendance	Record	Pts	Recap
1	October 9	Anaheim	1 – 4	San Jose		Nabokov	17,496	1–0–0	2
2	October 11	Los Angeles	1 – 3	San Jose		Nabokov	17,496	2–0–0	4
3	October 12	San Jose	1 – 0	Los Angeles		Boucher	18,118	3–0–0	6
4	October 14	Columbus	2 – 5	San Jose		Nabokov	17,496	4–0–0	8
5	October 17	San Jose	0 – 4	Anaheim		Nabokov	17,174	4–1–0	8
6	October 18	Philadelphia	4 – 5	San Jose	OT	Nabokov	17,496	5–1–0	10
7	October 22	San Jose	7 – 6	Philadelphia	SO	Nabokov	19,072	6–1–0	12
8	October 24	San Jose	3 – 4	Florida		Nabokov	15,232	6–2–0	12
9	October 25	San Jose	3 – 0	Tampa Bay		Boucher	16,831	7–2–0	14
10	October 28	Pittsburgh	1 – 2	San Jose		Nabokov	17,496	8–2–0	16
11	October 30	Detroit	2 – 4	San Jose		Nabokov	17,496	9–2–0	18

November: 11–1–1 (Home: 6–0–1; Road: 5–1–0)
#	Date	Visitor	Score	Home	OT	Decision	Attendance	Record	Pts	Recap
12	November 2	San Jose	5 – 3	Colorado		Nabokov	15,452	10–2–0	20
13	November 4	Minnesota	1 – 3	San Jose		Nabokov	17,183	11–2–0	22
14	November 6	St. Louis	4 – 5	San Jose	SO	Nabokov	17,496	12–2–0	24
15	November 8	Dallas	1 – 2	San Jose		Boucher	17,496	13–2–0	26
16	November 9	San Jose	2 – 4	Phoenix		Boucher	15,056	13–3–0	26
17	November 11	Nashville	4 – 3	San Jose	OT	Boucher	17,496	13–3–1	27
18	November 13	Calgary	1 – 6	San Jose		Boucher	17,496	14–3–1	29
19	November 16	San Jose	6 – 5	Chicago		Boucher	21,181	15–3–1	31
20	November 17	San Jose	4 – 1	Nashville		Boucher	13,312	16–3–1	33
21	November 22	Washington	2 – 7	San Jose		Boucher	17,496	17–3–1	35
22	November 26	Chicago	2 – 3	San Jose	OT	Nabokov	17,496	18–3–1	37
23	November 28	San Jose	6 – 2	Dallas		Nabokov	18,532	19–3–1	39
24	November 29	San Jose	3 – 2	Phoenix		Nabokov	14,007	20–3–1	41

December: 8–1–4 (Home: 6–0–1; Road: 2–1–3)
#	Date	Visitor	Score	Home	OT	Decision	Attendance	Record	Pts	Recap
25	December 2	Toronto	2 – 5	San Jose		Nabokov	17,496	21–3–1	43
26	December 4	Columbus	2 – 3	San Jose		Nabokov	17,496	22–3–1	45
27	December 6	Edmonton	3 – 2	San Jose	OT	Nabokov	17,496	22–3–2	46
28	December 11	Anaheim	0 – 2	San Jose		Nabokov	17,496	23–3–2	48
29	December 13	St. Louis	4 – 5	San Jose		Nabokov	17,496	24–3–2	50
30	December 15	San Jose	3 – 2	Los Angeles	SO	Boucher	16,005	25–3–2	52
31	December 17	San Jose	1 – 2	Columbus	OT	Nabokov	13,884	25–3–3	53
32	December 18	San Jose	0 – 6	Detroit		Nabokov	19,507	25–4–3	53
33	December 20	NY Rangers	2 – 3	San Jose		Nabokov	17,496	26–4–3	55
34	December 23	Vancouver	0 – 5	San Jose		Nabokov	17,496	27–4–3	57
35	December 27	San Jose	2 – 3	St. Louis	SO	Nabokov	19,150	27-4-4	58
36	December 29	San Jose	3 – 1	Dallas		Nabokov	18,532	28-4-4	60
37	December 31	San Jose	2 – 3	Minnesota	OT	Nabokov	18,568	28-4-5	61

January: 8–3–0 (Home: 5–2–0; Road: 3–1–0)
#	Date	Visitor	Score	Home	OT	Decision	Attendance	Record	Pts	Recap
38	January 3	NY Islanders	3 – 5	San Jose		Nabokov	17,496	29-4-5	63
39	January 6	San Jose	2 – 5	Calgary		Nabokov	18,289	29-5-5	63
40	January 9	San Jose	4 – 1	Edmonton		Nabokov	16,839	30-5-5	65
41	January 10	San Jose	4 – 2	Vancouver		Boucher	18,360	31-5-5	67
42	January 13	Tampa Bay	1 – 7	San Jose		Nabokov	17,496	32-5-5	69
43	January 15	Calgary	3 – 2	San Jose		Nabokov	17,496	32-6-5	69
44	January 17	Detroit	5 – 6	San Jose		Nabokov	17,496	33-6-5	71
45	January 20	Vancouver	1 – 2	San Jose	OT	Nabokov	17,496	34-6-5	73
46	January 27	San Jose	3 – 0	Colorado		Nabokov	14,592	35-6-5	75
47	January 29	Phoenix	0 – 2	San Jose		Nabokov	17,496	36-6-5	77
48	January 31	Chicago	4 – 2	San Jose		Nabokov	17,496	36-7-5	77

February: 6–3–4 (Home: 3–0–1; Road: 3–3–3)
#	Date	Visitor	Score	Home	OT	Decision	Attendance	Record	Pts	Recap
49	February 5	Carolina	4 – 3	San Jose	SO	Nabokov	17,496	36-7-6	78
50	February 7	San Jose	2 – 3	Columbus	OT	Nabokov	18,144	36-7-7	79
51	February 10	San Jose	5 – 2	Boston		Nabokov	17,565	37-7-7	81
52	February 11	San Jose	1 – 2	Pittsburgh	SO	Boucher	17,034	37-7-8	82
53	February 13	San Jose	5 – 6	Buffalo	SO	Nabokov	18,690	37-7-9	83
54	February 15	San Jose	5 – 6	New Jersey		Nabokov	17,625	37-8-9	83
55	February 17	Edmonton	2 – 4	San Jose		Nabokov	17,496	38-8-9	85
56	February 19	Los Angeles	2 – 4	San Jose		Nabokov	17,496	39-8-9	87
57	February 21	Atlanta	1 – 3	San Jose		Nabokov	17,496	40-8-9	89
58	February 23	San Jose	1 – 0	Dallas		Nabokov	17,988	41-8-9	91
59	February 25	San Jose	1 – 4	Detroit		Nabokov	20,066	41-9-9	91
60	February 26	San Jose	2 – 1	Ottawa		Boucher	17,791	42-9-9	93
61	February 28	San Jose	3 – 2	Montreal		Boucher	21,273	42-10-9	93

March: 8–5–2 (Home: 5-1-1; Road: 3–4–1)
#	Date	Visitor	Score	Home	OT	Decision	Attendance	Record	Pts	Recap
62	March 3	Dallas	4 – 1	San Jose		Boucher	17,496	42-11-9	93
63	March 5	Minnesota	4 – 3	San Jose	OT	Boucher	17,496	42-11-10	94
64	March 7	San Jose	1 – 3	Vancouver		Boucher	18,630	42-12-10	94
65	March 10	San Jose	5 – 4	Minnesota	OT	Boucher	18,568	43-12-10	96
66	March 12	San Jose	1 – 3	St. Louis		Boucher	19,150	43-13-10	96
67	March 14	Los Angeles	1 – 2	San Jose	SO	Nabokov	17,496	44-13-10	98
68	March 15	San Jose	1 – 0	Anaheim		Nabokov	17,511	45-13-10	100	Clinch Playoff spot
69	March 17	San Jose	3 – 4	Phoenix		Boucher	15,563	45-14-10	100	Clinch Pacific Division
70	March 19	Nashville	2 – 3	San Jose	SO	Nabokov	17,496	46-14-10	102
71	March 21	Dallas	2 – 5	San Jose		Nabokov	17,496	47-14-10	104
72	March 22	Colorado	1 – 3	San Jose		Nabokov	17,496	48-14-10	106
73	March 25	San Jose	5 – 6	Chicago	SO	Nabokov	21,812	48-14-11	107
74	March 26	San Jose	2 – 3	Nashville		Nabokov	16,568	48-15-11	107
75	March 28	Phoenix	2 – 3	San Jose		Nabokov	17,496	49-15-11	109
76	March 30	San Jose	2 – 1	Calgary		Nabokov	19,289	50-15-11	111

April: 3–3–0 (Home: 1–2–0; Road: 2–1–0)
#	Date	Visitor	Score	Home	OT	Decision	Attendance	Record	Pts	Recap
77	April 2	San Jose	2 – 1	Edmonton		Nabokov	16,839	51-15-11	113
78	April 4	Anaheim	5 – 2	San Jose		Nabokov	17,496	51-16-11	113
79	April 5	San Jose	3 – 2	Anaheim		Boucher	17,398	52-16-11	115
80	April 7	Colorado	0 – 1	San Jose	SO	Nabokov	17,496	53-16-11	117	Clinch President's Trophy
81	April 9	Phoenix	4 – 1	San Jose		Nabokov	17,496	53-17-11	117
82	April 11	San Jose	3 – 4	Los Angeles		Nabokov	18,118	53–18–11	117

== Playoffs ==
2009 Stanley Cup playoffs

Western Conference Quarter-finals: vs. (8) Anaheim Ducks
#	Date	Visitor	Score	Home	OT	Decision	Attendance	Series	Recap
1	April 16	Anaheim	2–0	San Jose		Nabokov	17,496	0–1	Recap
2	April 19	Anaheim	3–2	San Jose		Nabokov	17,496	0–2	Recap
3	April 21	San Jose	4–3	Anaheim		Nabokov	16,277	1–2	Recap
4	April 23	San Jose	0–4	Anaheim		Nabokov	16,830	1–3	Recap
5	April 25	Anaheim	2–3	San Jose	OT	Nabokov	17,496	2–3	Recap
6	April 27	San Jose	1–4	Anaheim		Nabokov	17,174	2–4	Recap

== Player statistics ==
=== Skaters ===
Note: Pos = Position; GP = Games played; G = Goals; A = Assists; Pts = Points; PIM = Penalty minutes; +/- = Plus/minus; PPG = Power-play goals; SHG = Short-handed goals; GWG = Game-winning goals

Regular season

Player	GP	G	A	Pts	+/−	PIM
Joe Thornton	82	25	61	86	+16	56
Patrick Marleau	76	38	33	71	+16	18
Devin Setoguchi	81	31	34	65	+16	25
Joe Pavelski	80	25	34	59	+5	46
Dan Boyle	77	16	41	57	+6	52
Milan Michalek	77	23	34	57	+11	52
Ryane Clowe	71	22	30	52	+8	51
Rob Blake	73	10	35	45	+15	110
Christian Ehrhoff	77	8	34	42	-12	63
Marc-Edouard Vlasic	82	6	30	36	+15	42
Jonathan Cheechoo	66	12	17	29	-3	59
Mike Grier	62	10	13	23	+8	25
Jeremy Roenick	42	4	9	13	-1	24
Tomas Plihal	64	5	8	13	-4	22
Marcel Goc	55	2	9	11	-6	18
Brad Lukowich	58	0	8	8	+5	12
Alexei Semenov	47	1	7	8	+3	57
Douglas Murray	75	0	7	7	+6	38
Jamie McGinn	35	4	2	6	-6	2
Travis Moen^{†}	19	3	2	5	-1	14
Jody Shelley	70	2	2	4	-6	116
Lukas Kaspar	13	1	2	3	0	76
Brad Staubitz	35	1	2	3	0	76
Tom Cavanagh	17	1	1	2	-2	4
Claude Lemieux	18	0	1	1	-5	21
Riley Armstrong	2	0	0	0	-1	2
Ryan Vesce	10	0	0	0	-2	4
Derek Joslin	12	0	0	0	-3	6

Playoffs

Player	GP	G	A	Pts	+/−	PIM
Joe Thornton	6	1	4	5	-3	5
Rob Blake	6	1	3	4	-5	4
Dan Boyle	6	2	2	4	-1	8
Patrick Marleau	6	2	1	3	0	8
Devin Setoguchi	6	1	2	3	-1	2
Jonathan Cheechoo	6	1	1	2	+1	4
Ryane Clowe	6	1	1	2	-4	8
Jeremy Roenick	6	0	1	1	-1	12
Milan Michalek	6	1	0	1	-3	2
Marc-Edouard Vlasic	6	0	1	1	-6	0
Joe Pavelski	6	0	1	1	-3	9
Mike Grier	6	0	0	0	-2	6
Claude Lemieux	1	0	0	0	0	0
Brad Lukowich	6	0	0	0	+1	0
Jody Shelley	1	0	0	0	0	0
Marcel Goc	6	0	0	0	-2	2
Christian Ehrhoff	6	0	0	0	-2	2
Travis Moen	6	0	0	0	-4	2
Douglas Murray	6	0	0	0	-1	9
Torrey Mitchell	4	0	0	0	-1	2

=== Goaltenders ===
Note: Pos = Position;GP = Games played; Min, TOI = Minutes played; W = Wins; L = Losses; T,T/OT = Ties; OTL = Overtime losses; GA = Goals-against; GAA = Goals-against average; SO = Shutouts; SA = Shots against; SV = Shots saved; SV% = Save percentage;

Regular season

Player	GP	Min	W	L	OT	GA	GAA	SA	SV	Sv%	SO
Evgeni Nabokov	62	3686	41	12	8	150	2.44	1663	1513	.910	7
Brian Boucher	22	1291	12	6	3	47	2.18	563	516	.917	2

Playoffs

Player	GP	Min	W	L	GA	GAA	SA	SV	Sv%	SO
Evgeni Nabokov	6	361	2	4	17	2.82	155	138	.890	0

^{†}Denotes player spent time with another team before joining Sharks. Stats reflect time with the Sharks only.
^{‡}Traded mid-season
Bold/italics denotes franchise record

== Awards and records ==
=== Awards ===
Pacific Division Champions
President's Trophy

=== Records ===
- Most points by one team in Pacific Division history (117)

=== Milestones ===
Regular Season
Player	Milestone	Reached

== Transactions ==
=== Trades ===
Sharks acquired defensemen Dan Boyle and Brad Lukowich for defenseman Matt Carle, defensive prospect Ty Wishart, a first-round-pick in the 2009 NHL entry draft and a fourth-round-pick in the 2010 NHL entry draft.

Traded defenseman Craig Rivet to Buffalo Sabres for a second-round pick in the 2009 NHL entry draft and a second-round-pick in the 2010 NHL entry draft.

=== Free agents ===
Player	Former team	Contract Terms
Rob Blake	Los Angeles Kings	1 year, US$5 million
Brendan Buckley	Iserlohn Roosters	1 year, US$500,000, two-way contract

Player	New team	Contract Terms
Brian Campbell	Chicago Blackhawks	8 years, US$56.8 million

=== Claimed from waivers ===
Player	Former team	Date claimed off waivers

=== Draft picks ===
San Jose's picks at the 2008 NHL entry draft in Ottawa, Ontario.

Round	#	Player	Nationality	College/Junior/Club team (League)
3	62	Justin Daniels (C)	United States	Kent School (USHS-CT)
4	92	Samuel Groulx (D)	Canada	Quebec Remparts (QMJHL)
4	106	Harri Sateri (G)	Finland	Tappara (Finland Jr.)
5	146	Julien Demers (D)	Canada	Ottawa 67's (OHL)
6	177	Tommy Wingels (C)	United States	Miami University (CCHA)
7	186	Jason Demers (D)	Canada	Victoriaville Tigres (QMJHL)
7	194	Drew Daniels (RW)	United States	Kent School (USHS-CT)

== Farm teams ==
The Sharks affiliate in the American Hockey League was the Worcester Sharks. The Worcester club finished in fourth place in the AHL's Atlantic Division with 42 wins and 35 losses. Worcester's leading scorer was Mike Iggulden with 29 goals and 66 points.
