= 2008–09 Nashville Predators season =

Professional ice hockey team season

2008–09 Nashville Predators
- Division: 5th Central
- Conference: 10th Western
- 2008–09 record: 40–34–8
- Home record: 24–13–2
- Road record: 16–21–4
- Goals for: 213
- Goals against: 233

Team information
- General manager: David Poile
- Coach: Barry Trotz
- Captain: Jason Arnott
- Alternate captains: Jean-Pierre Dumont; Shea Weber
- Arena: Sommet Center
- Average attendance: 15,011 (87.7%); Total: 615,439

The 2008–09 Nashville Predators season began on October 10, 2008. It was the Nashville Predators' 11th season in the National Hockey League (NHL). The Predators ended up missing the playoffs for the first time since 2002-03 season

== Pre-season ==
2008 pre-season game log: 2–4–0 (home: 1–2–0; road: 1–2–0)
#	Date	Visitor	Score	Home	OT	Decision	Attendance	Record	Recap
1	September 25	Atlanta	4–2	Nashville		Rinne	10,558	0–1–0
2	September 26	Nashville	3–4	Columbus		MacIntyre	11,964	0–2–0
3	September 27	Columbus	1–3	Nashville		Ellis	12,078	1–2–0
4	October 2	Carolina	4–2	Nashville		Ellis	12,903	1–3–0
5	October 3	Nashville	6–4	Atlanta		Rinne	6,753	2–3–0
6	October 5	Nashville	0–2	Carolina		Ellis	11,313	2–4–0

== Regular season ==
=== Divisional standings ===
Central Division
		GP	W	L	OTL	GF	GA	Pts
**1**	**y – Detroit Red Wings**	**82**	**51**	**21**	**10**	**295**	**244**	**112**
**2**	**Chicago Blackhawks**	**82**	**46**	**24**	**12**	**264**	**216**	**104**
**3**	**St. Louis Blues**	**82**	**41**	**31**	**10**	**233**	**233**	**92**
**4**	**Columbus Blue Jackets**	**82**	**41**	**31**	**10**	**226**	**230**	**92**
5	Nashville Predators	82	40	34	8	213	233	88

=== Conference standings ===
Western Conference
R		Div	GP	W	L	OTL	GF	GA	Pts
**1**	**p – San Jose Sharks**	**PA**	**82**	**53**	**18**	**11**	**257**	**204**	117
**2**	**y – Detroit Red Wings**	**CE**	**82**	**51**	**21**	**10**	**295**	**244**	112
**3**	**y – Vancouver Canucks**	**NW**	**82**	**45**	**27**	**10**	**246**	**220**	100
**4**	**Chicago Blackhawks**	**CE**	**82**	**46**	**24**	**12**	**264**	**216**	104
**5**	**Calgary Flames**	**NW**	**82**	**46**	**30**	**6**	**254**	**248**	98
**6**	**St. Louis Blues**	**CE**	**82**	**41**	**31**	**10**	**233**	**233**	92
**7**	**Columbus Blue Jackets**	**CE**	**82**	**41**	**31**	**10**	**226**	**230**	92
**8**	**Anaheim Ducks**	**PA**	**82**	**42**	**33**	**7**	**245**	**238**	91
8.5
9	Minnesota Wild	NW	82	40	33	9	219	200	89
10	Nashville Predators	CE	82	40	34	8	213	233	88
11	Edmonton Oilers	NW	82	38	35	9	234	248	85
12	Dallas Stars	PA	82	36	35	11	230	257	83
13	Phoenix Coyotes	PA	82	36	39	7	208	252	79
14	Los Angeles Kings	PA	82	34	37	11	207	234	79
15	Colorado Avalanche	NW	82	32	45	5	199	257	69

bold – qualified for playoffs, y – division winner, p – Presidents' Trophy winner
CE – Central Division, NW – Northwest Division, PA – Pacific Division

=== Game log ===
2008–09 game log

October: 5–4–1 (home: 4–1–0; road: 1–3–1)
#	**Date**	**Visitor**	**Score**	**Home**	**OT**	**Decision**	**Attendance**	**Record**	**Pts**	**Recap**
1	October 10	Nashville	2–5	St. Louis		Ellis	19,150	0–1–0	0
2	October 11	Dallas	1–3	Nashville		Ellis	17,113	1–1–0	2
3	October 13	Nashville	3–2	Chicago	SO	Ellis	21,712	2–1–0	4
4	October 15	Nashville	4–6	Dallas		Ellis	16,899	2–2–0	4
5	October 17	Nashville	3–5	Columbus		Ellis	17,930	2–3–0	4
6	October 18	Columbus	3–6	Nashville		Ellis	13,259	3–3–0	6
7	October 23	Calgary	5–3	Nashville		Ellis	12,042	3–4–0	6
8	October 25	Los Angeles	4–5	Nashville		Ellis	14,704	4–4–0	8
9	October 28	Nashville	3–4	Washington	SO	Ellis	17,011	4–4–1	9
10	October 30	Edmonton	1–3	Nashville		Rinne	11,294	5–4–1	11

November: 6–6–1 (home: 1–2–1; road: 5–4–0)
#	**Date**	**Visitor**	**Score**	**Home**	**OT**	**Decision**	**Attendance**	**Record**	**Pts**	**Recap**
11	November 1	Florida	2–3	Nashville	SO	Rinne	14,909	6–4–1	13
12	November 4	Nashville	0–4	Vancouver		Ellis	18,630	6–5–1	13
13	November 6	Nashville	6–7	Calgary		Ellis	19,289	6–6–1	13
14	November 8	Nashville	0–1	Colorado		Ellis	18,007	6–7–1	13
15	November 11	Nashville	4–3	San Jose	OT	Ellis	17,496	7–7–1	15
16	November 14	Nashville	4–3	Anaheim	OT	Ellis	16,485	8–7–1	17
17	November 15	Nashville	3–1	Los Angeles		Ellis	14,135	9–7–1	19
18	November 17	San Jose	4–1	Nashville		Ellis	13,312	9–8–1	19
19	November 21	Nashville	1–4	Tampa Bay		Ellis	16,444	9–9–1	19
20	November 23	Nashville	5–2	Carolina		Ellis	13,042	10–9–1	21
21	November 25	St. Louis	1–0	Nashville	SO	Ellis	13,825	10–9–2	22
22	November 28	Nashville	4–3	Atlanta	OT	Rinne	15,022	11–9–2	24
23	November 29	Minnesota	6–2	Nashville		Ellis	13,990	11–10–2	24

December: 6–6–1 (home: 5–1–0; road: 1–5–1)
#	**Date**	**Visitor**	**Score**	**Home**	**OT**	**Decision**	**Attendance**	**Record**	**Pts**	**Recap**
24	December 1	Nashville	2–0	Buffalo		Rinne	18,690	12–10–2	26
25	December 4	Colorado	2–3	Nashville		Rinne	12,717	13–10–2	28
26	December 6	Minnesota	0–1	Nashville		Rinne	14,408	14–10–2	30
27	December 8	Nashville	3–6	St. Louis		Rinne	14,537	14–11–2	30
28	December 9	Vancouver	3–1	Nashville		Ellis	12,441	14–12–2	30
29	December 11	Nashville	1–2	Columbus	SO	Ellis	13,484	14–12–3	31
30	December 13	Dallas	0–3	Nashville		Ellis	15,426	15–12–3	33
31	December 18	Nashville	1–2	Phoenix		Ellis	14,193	15–13–3	33
32	December 20	NY Islanders	0–1	Nashville		Rinne	16,457	16–13–3	35
33	December 23	Nashville	0–3	Florida		Rinne	14,703	16–14–3	35
34	December 26	Detroit	2–3	Nashville		Ellis	17,113	17–14–3	37
35	December 28	Nashville	2–5	Edmonton		Ellis	16,839	17–15–3	37
36	December 29	Nashville	1–5	Colorado		Rinne	15,643	17–16–3	37

January: 4–8–0 (home: 2–5–0; road: 2–3–0)
#	**Date**	**Visitor**	**Score**	**Home**	**OT**	**Decision**	**Attendance**	**Record**	**Pts**	**Recap**
37	January 1	Vancouver	2–1	Nashville		Rinne	16,502	17–17–3	37
38	January 3	Calgary	3–2	Nashville		Ellis	14,321	17–18–3	37
39	January 6	Colorado	2–1	Nashville		Rinne	13,598	17–19–3	37
40	January 8	Pittsburgh	3–5	Nashville		Rinne	14,297	18–19–3	39
41	January 10	Chicago	1–4	Nashville		Rinne	16,802	19–19–3	41
42	January 11	Nashville	1–3	Chicago		Ellis	21,666	19–20–3	41
43	January 13	Nashville	2–0	Toronto		Rinne	19,223	20–20–3	43
44	January 15	Nashville	2–3	Montreal		Rinne	21,273	20–21–3	43
45	January 17	Atlanta	7–2	Nashville		Ellis	17,113	20–22–3	43
46	January 19	New Jersey	3–1	Nashville		Rinne	14,848	20–23–3	43
47	January 28	Nashville	5–3	Vancouver		Rinne	18,630	21–23–3	45
48	January 30	Nashville	1–3	Calgary		Rinne	19,289	21–24–3	45

February: 10–4–1 (home: 7–2–1; road: 3–2–0)
#	**Date**	**Visitor**	**Score**	**Home**	**OT**	**Decision**	**Attendance**	**Record**	**Pts**	**Recap**
49	February 1	Nashville	2–1	Edmonton		Rinne	16,839	22–24–3	47
50	February 3	Phoenix	1–2	Nashville		Rinne	13,195	23–24–3	49
51	February 5	Anaheim	2–4	Nashville		Rinne	14,877	24–24–3	51
52	February 6	Nashville	2–0	Minnesota		Ellis	18,568	25–24–3	53
53	February 8	Nashville	1–4	Dallas		Ellis	17,689	25–25–3	53
54	February 10	Detroit	5–3	Nashville		Rinne	15,077	25–26–3	53
55	February 12	St. Louis	3–4	Nashville	SO	Rinne	14,307	26–26–3	55
56	February 14	Boston	2–3	Nashville	SO	Rinne	17,113	27–26–3	57
57	February 16	Ottawa	2–0	Nashville		Rinne	14,681	27–27–3	57
58	February 18	Nashville	2–6	Detroit		Ellis	20,066	27–28–3	57
59	February 19	St. Louis	2–1	Nashville	OT	Rinne	15,037	27–28–4	58
60	February 21	Nashville	1–0	St. Louis	OT	Rinne	19,250	28–28–4	60
61	February 24	Chicago	3–5	Nashville		Rinne	15,075	29–28–4	62
62	February 26	Phoenix	1–4	Nashville		Rinne	14,954	30–28–4	64
63	February 28	Detroit	0–8	Nashville		Rinne	17,113	31–28–4	66

March: 7–3–4 (home: 4–1–2; road: 3–2–2)
#	**Date**	**Visitor**	**Score**	**Home**	**OT**	**Decision**	**Attendance**	**Record**	**Pts**	**Recap**
64	March 3	Edmonton	5–6	Nashville	OT	Rinne	14,194	32–28–4	68
65	March 5	Columbus	2–4	Nashville		Rinne	13,064	33–28–4	70
66	March 7	Nashville	1–4	Philadelphia		Rinne	19,611	33–29–4	70
67	March 10	Washington	2–1	Nashville	OT	Ellis	16,064	33–29–5	71
68	March 12	NY Rangers	4–2	Nashville		Ellis	16,241	33–30–5	71
69	March 14	Nashville	2–0	Phoenix		Rinne	13,197	34–30–5	73
70	March 16	Nashville	4–3	Los Angeles		Rinne	17,810	35–30–5	75
71	March 18	Nashville	3–4	Anaheim	OT	Rinne	16,181	35–30–6	76
72	March 19	Nashville	2–3	San Jose	SO	Rinne	17,496	35–30–7	77
73	March 24	Anaheim	2–1	Nashville	SO	Rinne	16,418	35–30–8	78
74	March 26	San Jose	2–3	Nashville		Rinne	16,562	36–30–8	80
75	March 28	Los Angeles	3–4	Nashville	OT	Rinne	17,113	37–30–8	82
76	March 29	Nashville	4–3	Detroit		Rinne	20,066	38–30–8	84
77	March 31	Nashville	1–2	Columbus		Rinne	14,495	38–31–8	84

April: 2–3–0 (home: 1–1–0; road: 1–2–0)
#	**Date**	**Visitor**	**Score**	**Home**	**OT**	**Decision**	**Attendance**	**Record**	**Pts**	**Recap**
78	April 3	Nashville	1–3	Chicago		Rinne	21,628	38–32–8	84
79	April 4	Columbus	4–5	Nashville	SO	Rinne	16,750	39–32–8	86
80	April 7	Chicago	4–2	Nashville		Rinne	17,113	39–33–8	86
81	April 9	Nashville	4–3	Detroit	SO	Rinne	20,066	40–33–8	88
82	April 10	Nashville	4–8	Minnesota		Rinne	18,568	40–34–8	88

**Legend**: Win (2 points) Loss (0 points) Overtime/shootout loss (1 point)

== Playoffs ==
The Nashville Predators failed to qualify for the 2009 Stanley Cup playoffs, making it the first time that the Predators missed the playoffs since 2003.

== Player stats ==
=== Skaters ===
Note: Pos = Position; GP = Games played; G = Goals; A = Assists; Pts = Points; PIM = Penalty minutes; +/- = Plus/minus; PPG = Power-play goals; SHG = Short-handed goals; GWG = Game-winning goals

Regular season

Player	GP	G	A	Pts	+/−	PIM
Jean-Pierre Dumont	82	16	49	65	+1	20
Jason Arnott	65	33	24	57	+2	49
Shea Weber	81	23	30	53	+1	80
Martin Erat	71	17	33	50	-7	48
Ryan Suter	82	7	38	45	-16	73
David Legwand	73	20	22	42	-3	32
Joel Ward	79	17	18	35	+1	29
Steve Sullivan	41	11	21	32	+2	30
Dan Hamhuis	82	3	23	26	-4	67
Radek Bonk	66	9	16	25	-12	34
Vernon Fiddler	78	11	6	17	-13	24
Ryan Jones	46	7	10	17	+1	22
Jordin Tootoo	72	4	12	16	-15	124
Jerred Smithson	82	4	9	13	-6	49
Kevin Klein	63	4	8	12	-2	19
Greg Zanon	82	4	7	11	+8	38
Ville Koistinen	38	3	8	11	0	14
Scott Nichol	43	4	6	10	0	41
Rich Peverley^{‡}	27	2	7	9	-3	15
Patric Hornqvist	28	2	5	7	-3	16
Antti Pihlstrom	53	2	5	7	-1	10
Greg de Vries	71	1	4	5	-15	65
Cal O'Reilly	11	3	2	5	+2	2
Wade Belak^{†}	38	0	2	2	-1	54
Nick Tarnasky^{‡}	11	0	1	1	+1	17
Jed Ortmeyer	2	0	0	0	0	0
Mike Santorelli	7	0	0	0	-5	2

=== Goaltenders ===
Note: Pos = Position;GP = Games played; Min, TOI = Minutes played; W = Wins; L = Losses; T,T/OT = Ties; OTL = Overtime losses; GA = Goals-against; GAA = Goals-against average; SO = Shutouts; SA = Shots against; SV = Shots saved; SV% = Save percentage;

Regular season

Player	GP	Min	W	L	OT	GA	GAA	SA	SV	Sv%	SO
Pekka Rinne	52	2999	29	15	4	119	2.38	1435	1316	.917	7
Dan Ellis	35	1964	11	19	4	96	2.93	963	867	.900	3

^{†}Denotes player spent time with another team before joining Predators. Stats reflect time with the Predators only.
^{‡}Traded mid-season
Bold/italics denotes franchise record

== Awards and records ==
=== Milestones ===
Regular season
Player	Milestone	Reached
Patric Hornqvist	1st NHL Game	October 10, 2008
Ryan Jones	1st NHL Game	October 10, 2008
Joel Ward	1st NHL Goal	October 10, 2008
Jean-Pierre Dumont	600th NHL Game	October 15, 2008
Patric Hornqvist	1st NHL Goal; 1st NHL Point	October 15, 2008
Ryan Jones	1st NHL Goal; 1st NHL Assist; 1st NHL Point	October 15, 2008
Jean-Pierre Dumont	400th NHL Point	October 18, 2008
Patric Hornqvist	1st NHL Assist	October 25, 2008
Jason Arnott	Franchise Single Season Goal Record (33)	April 10, 2009

== Transactions ==
=== Trades ===
June 20, 2008	To Nashville Predators 4th-round pick in 2008 – Dale Weise	To St. Louis Blues Chris Mason
June 20, 2008	To Nashville Predators 1st-round pick (7th overall) in 2008 – Colin Wilson	To New York Islanders 1st-round pick (9th overall) in 2008 – Josh Bailey; 2nd-round pick in 2008 – Aaron Ness
June 20, 2008	To Nashville Predators 1st-round pick (18th overall) in 2008 – Chet Pickard; 3rd-round pick in 2009 – Taylor Beck	To Ottawa Senators 1st-round pick (15th overall) in 2008 – Erik Karlsson
September 29, 2008	To Nashville Predators Nick Tarnasky	To Tampa Bay Lightning Conditional 6th-round pick in 2009 – Jaroslav Janus
October 30, 2008	To Nashville Predators Hugh Jessiman	To New York Rangers Future Considerations
October 30, 2008	To Nashville Predators Tim Ramholt	To Philadelphia Flyers Josh Gratton
November 27, 2008	To Nashville Predators Wade Belak	To Florida Panthers Nick Tarnasky

=== Free agents ===
Player	New team
Alex Henry	Montreal Canadiens
Darcy Hordichuk	Vancouver Canucks

|}

== Draft picks ==
Nashville's picks at the 2008 NHL entry draft in Ottawa, Ontario.

Round	Pick	Player	Position	Nationality	College
1	7 (from Toronto via NY Islanders)	Colin Wilson	(C)	United States	Boston University (Hockey East)
1	18 (from Ottawa)	Chet Pickard	(G)	Canada	Tri-City Americans (WHL)
2	38 (from Toronto via Phoenix)	Roman Josi	(D)	Switzerland	SC Bern (NLA)
5	136	Taylor Stefishen	(LW)	Canada	Langley Chiefs (BCHL)
6	166	Jeff Foss	(D)	United States	Rensselaer Polytechnic Institute (ECAC)
7	201 (from NY Rangers)	Jani Lajunen	(C)	Finland	Espoo Blues (Finland Jr.)
7	207 (from San Jose)	Anders Lindback	(G)	Sweden	Brynäs IF (Elitserien)

== See also ==
- 2008–09 NHL season
