= 2010–11 Binghamton Senators season =

The 2010–11 Binghamton Senators season was the American Hockey League franchise's ninth season of play. It was the Senators' first season under head coach Kurt Kleinendorst. The Senators finished the season in fifth place in the East division, qualifying for the Calder Cup playoffs for the first time since 2004–05. In the playoffs, the Senators defeated the Houston Aeros four games to two in the Calder Cup Finals to capture their first Calder Cup Championship. The Senators captain was Ryan Keller. The Senators alternate captains were Cody Bass and Derek Smith.

== Divisional standings ==
Rank	Team	Wins	Losses	OT Losses	SO Losses	Points
1	Wilkes-Barre/Scranton Penguins	58	21	0	1	117
2	Hershey Bears	46	26	3	5	100
3	Charlotte Checkers	44	27	2	7	97
4	Norfolk Admirals	39	26	9	6	93
5	Binghamton Senators	42	30	3	5	92
6	Syracuse Crunch	35	38	3	4	77
7	Adirondack Phantoms	31	39	4	6	72
8	Albany Devils	32	42	1	5	70

== Schedule and results ==
=== Regular season ===
Date	Opponent	Result	Record
10/8	Adirondack Phantoms	W 5-1	1-0-0-0
10/9	Norfolk Admirals	L 7-4	1-1-0-0
10/15	Hershey Bears	L 7-1	1-2-0-0
10/16	at Syracuse Crunch	L 2-1	1-3-0-0
10/17	at Toronto Marlies	W 3-1	2-3-0-0
10/22	at Connecticut Whale	W 1-0	3-3-0-0
10/23	at Wilkes-Barre/Scranton Penguins	L 2-1 SO	3-3-0-1
10/29	Charlotte Checkers	W 4-3 OT	4-3-0-1
10/30	Charlotte Checkers	L 3-2 OT	4-3-1-1
11/5	at Hamilton Bulldogs	L 5-2	4-4-1-1
11/6	Adirondack Phantoms	W 7-3	5-4-1-1
11/7	Syracuse Crunch	W 5-0	6-4-1-1
11/10	Rochester Americans	L 6-4	6-5-1-1
11/12	at Wilkes-Barre/Scranton Penguins	W 5-1	7-5-1-1
11/13	Toronto Marlies	L 4-3	7-6-1-1
11/14	at Hershey Bears	L 8-3	7-7-1-1
11/17	at Syracuse Crunch	W 4-0	8-7-1-1
11/19	Hershey Bears	W 4-2	9-7-1-1
11/20	Connecticut Whale	L 3-2 OT	9-7-2-1
11/21	at Wilkes-Barre/Scranton Penguins	L 2-1	9-8-2-1
11/25	Wilkes-Barre/Scranton Penguins	W 5-2	10-8-2-1
11/26	Hamilton Bulldogs	L 1-0	10-9-2-1
11/27	at Albany Devils	L 4-3	10-10-2-1
12/3	at Wilkes-Barre/Scranton Penguins	L 4-2	10-11-2-1
12/4	at Hershey Bears	L 4-0	10-12-2-1
12/10	Albany Devils	W 5-0	11-12-2-1
12/11	Rochester Americans	L 4-3 SO	11-12-2-2
12/12	at Rochester Americans	W 6-5 SO	12-12-2-2
12/17	Syracuse Crunch	W 7-0	13-12-2-2
12/18	Charlotte Checkers	L 4-2	13-13-2-2
12/19	at Rochester Americans	W 3-2	14-13-2-2
12/26	Adirondack Phantoms	W 7-1	15-13-2-2
12/28	at Hershey Bears	L 6-1	15-14-2-2
12/31	Albany Devils	L 5-4	15-15-2-2
1/1	at Charlotte Checkers	W 3-0	16-15-2-2
1/2	at Charlotte Checkers	L 4-2	16-16-2-2
1/7	Syracuse Crunch	W 6-4	17-16-2-2
1/8	Rochester Americans	W 2-1	18-16-2-2
1/9	at Providence Bruins	W 5-3	19-16-2-2
1/11	at Portland Pirates	W 5-2	20-16-2-2
1/14	at Albany Devils	L 3-2	20-17-2-2
1/15	Manchester Monarchs	L 4-3	20-18-2-2
1/16	Hershey Bears	W 2-1	21-18-2-2
1/19	at Albany Devils	W 3-0	22-18-2-2
1/21	Norfolk Admirals	L 3-2 SO	22-18-2-3
1/22	at Manchester Monarchs	W 4-2	23-18-2-3
1/26	at Adirondack Phantoms	L 4-3	23-19-2-3
1/28	Hershey Bears	3-2	23-20-2-3
1/29	Wilkes-Barre/Scranton Penguins	W 2-1	24-20-2-3
2/4	at Norfolk Admirals	L 2-1 OT	24-20-3-3
2/5	at Norfolk Admirals	W 2-1	25-20-3-3
2/11	at Rochester Americans	W 3-0	26-20-3-3
2/12	at Hershey Bears	W 4-3	27-20-3-3
2/13	at Adirondack Phantoms	W 4-3 OT	28-20-3-3
2/18	Charlotte Checkers	W 6-2	29-20-3-3
2/19	Albany Devils	W 4-3 OT	30-20-3-3
2/23	Wilkes-Barre/Scranton Penguins	W 4-1	31-20-3-3
2/25	at Syracuse Crunch	W 7-4	32-20-3-3
2/26	Rochester Americans	L 3-2 SO	32-20-3-4
2/27	at Adirondack Phantoms	L 5-2	32-21-3-4
3/1	Albany Devils	L 3-2	32-22-3-4
3/6	Norfolk Admirals	W 4-1	33-22-3-4
3/8	at Charlotte Checkers	L 2-1	33-23-3-4
3/9	at Norfolk Admirals	L 5-1	33-24-3-4
3/11	at Norfolk Admirals	L 8-3	33-25-3-4
3/12	at Charlotte Checkers	W 3-1	34-25-3-4
3/16	at Adirondack Phantoms	L 5-2	34-26-3-4
3/18	at Portland Pirates	L 3-2	34-27-3-4
3/19	Springfield Falcons	W 2-0	35-27-3-4
3/20	at Bridgeport Sound Tigers	W 4-3 OT	36-27-3-4
3/23	Syracuse Crunch	W 6-3	37-27-3-4
3/25	Wilkes-Barre/Scranton Penguins	W 5-3	38-27-3-4
3/26	Providence Bruins	W 4-1	39-27-3-4
3/27	at Springfield Falcons	W 4-1	40-27-3-4
4/1	at Syracuse Crunch	L 6-4	40-28-3-4
4/2	Bridgeport Sound Tigers	L 4-3	40-29-3-4
4/3	at Albany Devils	L 3-2 SO	40-29-3-5
4/6	Norfolk Admirals	W 2-1 OT	41-29-3-5
4/8	at Rochester Americans	W 4-2	42-29-3-5
4/9	Adirondack Phantoms	L 2-1	42-30-3-5

=== Postseason ===
Round	Date	Opponent	Result	Series
1	4/14	at Manchester Monarchs	L 2-1	MAN leads 1-0
1	4/15	at Manchester Monarchs	W 4-3 OT	Series tied 1-1
1	4/17	Manchester Monarchs	L 5-4 OT	MAN leads series 2-1
1	4/19	Manchester Monarchs	L 6-3	MAN leads series 3-1
1	4/20	Manchester Monarchs	W 5-4 OT	MAN leads series 3-2
1	4/22	at Manchester Monarchs	W 2-1 OT	Series tied 3-3
1	4/23	at Manchester Monarchs	W 6-5 OT	BING wins series 4-3
Quarterfinals	4/27	at Portland Pirates	W 3-2	BING leads series 1-0
Quarterfinals	4/28	at Portland Pirates	W 5-3	BING leads series 2-0
Quarterfinals	4/30	Portland Pirates	L 3-2	BING leads series 2-1
Quarterfinals	5/2	Portland Pirates	W 6-1	BING leads series 3-1
Quarterfinals	5/3	Portland Pirates	L 6-2	BING leads series 3-2
Quarterfinals	5/6	at Portland Pirates	W 3-0	BING wins series 4-2
Semifinals	5/12	at Charlotte Checkers	W 7-4	BING leads series 1-0
Semifinals	5/13	at Charlotte Checkers	W 3-0	BING leads series 2-0
Semifinals	5/17	Charlotte Checkers	W 7-1	BING leads series 3-0
Semifinals	5/18	Charlotte Checkers	W 4-3 OT	BING wins series 4-0
Finals	5/27	at Houston Aeros	L 3-1	HOU leads series 1-0
Finals	5/28	at Houston Aeros	W 2-1 OT	Series tied 1-1
Finals	6/1	Houston Aeros	L 2-1	HOU leads series 2-1
Finals	6/3	Houston Aeros	W 3-0	Series tied 2-2
Finals	6/4	Houston Aeros	W 4-2	BING leads series 3-2
Finals	6/7	at Houston Aeros	W 3-2	BING wins series 4-2

== Roster ==
#	Player	Position
2	Eric Gryba	Defenseman
3	Patrick Coulombe	Defenseman
4	Jared Cowen	Defenseman
5	Mark Borowiecki	Defenseman
6	Craig Schira	Defenseman
7	Geoff Kinrade	Defenseman
8	David Sloane	Defenseman
9	Bob Raymond	Defenseman
11	Erik Condra	Right wing
12	Bobby Butler	Right wing
14	Roman Wick	Right wing
15	Colin Greening	Left wing
16	Cody Bass(A)	Center
17	Patrick Wiercioch	Defenseman
18	Zack Smith	Center
19	Jim O'Brien	Center
21	Derek Grant	Center
22	Ryan Potulny	Center
24	Derek Smith(A)	Defenceman
25	David Dziurzynski	Left wing
26	Kaspars Daugavins	Left wing
27	Mike Hoffman	Left wing
28	Ryan Keller(C)	Right wing
29	Mike Brodeur	Goalie
33	Barry Brust	Goalie
40	Robin Lehner	Goalie
44	Brennan Turner	Defenseman
61	Andre Benoit	Defenseman
84	Corey Locke	Center
