= 2009–10 Ottawa Senators season =

NHL hockey team season

2009–10 Ottawa Senators
- Division: 2nd Northeast
- Conference: 5th Eastern
- 2009–10 record: 44–32–6
- Home record: 26–11–4
- Road record: 18–21–2

Team information
- General manager: Bryan Murray
- Coach: Cory Clouston
- Captain: Daniel Alfredsson
- Alternate captains: Mike Fisher; Chris Phillips
- Arena: Scotiabank Place
- Average attendance: 18,269

Team leaders
- Goals: Mike Fisher (25)
- Assists: Daniel Alfredsson (43)
- Points: Daniel Alfredsson (85)
- Penalty minutes: Matt Carkner (190)
- Plus/minus: Peter Regin (+10)
- Wins: Brian Elliott (29)
- Goals against average: Brian Elliott (2.57)

The 2009–10 Ottawa Senators season was the 18th season of the Ottawa Senators of the National Hockey League (NHL). After missing the post-season in 2008–09 for the first time since the 1995–96 season, the team qualified for the playoffs with four games to play with a win against the Carolina Hurricanes on April 1, 2010. The Senators drew the defending Stanley Cup champion Pittsburgh Penguins in the first round, which the Penguins won 4–2.

== Off-season ==
In early June, left winger Dany Heatley notified general manager Bryan Murray that he wanted a trade out of Ottawa. According to reports, Heatley was dissatisfied with his role and ice time under new head coach Cory Clouston.

On June 15, it was announced that team president Roy Mlakar's contract would not be renewed. Cyril Leeder, one of the principals in the "Bring Back the Sens" drive in 1990 was named as team president. He had previously been president and chief operating officer of Scotiabank Place and the related Senators Sports and Entertainment Corporation.

The team announced its first-ever exhibition game in Regina, Saskatchewan, to be held on September 21 against the Tampa Bay Lightning. It will be the first NHL game in Regina in 19 years.

At the NHL Entry Draft, the team chose defenceman Jared Cowen as their first-round pick, ninth overall. Cowan had been projected as a top-five pick, but had suffered a knee injury during the 2008–09 season. Cowen is tall and is expected to play a "shut-down" role in the future with the Senators.

In the days leading up to the July 1 free agency period, a prospective trade emerged for Dany Heatley with the Edmonton Oilers. Reportedly, the Oilers offered Andrew Cogliano, Dustin Penner and Ladislav Smid. Heatley met with the Edmonton management and turned down the trade using a no-movement clause in his contract. On July 1, the Senators were required to make a $4 million payment in advance of Heatley's 2009–10 salary, and the Senators had hoped to move Heatley before the payment. According to Slam! Sports, the Oilers were not on a list of teams acceptable to Heatley, the list of teams including the Rangers, Bruins, Canucks, Sharks, Kings, Red Wings, Flames and Blackhawks. According to GM Murray, teams were "sour" on Heatley and there were few offers.

The Senators made a major free-agent signing on July 6 when they signed former Montreal Canadiens forward Alexei Kovalev to a two-year contract. Kovalev's salary put the Senators at the salary cap limit. The Senators partially addressed this by trading goaltender Alex Auld to the Dallas Stars for a draft pick. By the date of Kovalev's formal introduction press conference on July 21, Heatley had not yet been traded and Kovalev expressed the wish that Heatley would return.

By the opening of training camp on September 12, Heatley had not been traded. Heatley reported and participated in camp activities. Heatley met with Clouston and Murray who hoped to persuade Heatley to drop his trade demand, which he did not. After the meeting, Murray became convinced that Heatley could not stay and had to be moved immediately. Heatley was traded later that day to the San Jose Sharks for wingers Milan Michalek and Jonathan Cheechoo and an exchange of draft picks. On November 3, it was confirmed that Senators owner Eugene Melnyk filed a grievance to demand that Heatley return a $4 million bonus the Senators paid Heatley on July 1, part of his contract.

== Preseason ==
2009 Pre-season game log: 2–4–0 (Home: 1–1–0; Road: 0–2–0)

#	Date	Visitor	Score	Home	OT	Decision	Record	Recap
1	September 15 (in Halifax, NS)	Ottawa Senators	1-3	Florida Panthers		Leclaire	0-1-0	
2	September 16	Florida Panthers	2-1	Ottawa Senators		Brodeur	0-2-0	
3	September 18	Ottawa Senators	1-2	Montreal Canadiens		Lehner	0-3-0	
4	September 19	Montreal Canadiens	1-6	Ottawa Senators		Leclaire	1-3-0	
5	September 21 (in Regina, SK)	Ottawa Senators	3-1	Tampa Bay Lightning		Elliott	2-3-0	
6	September 25	Boston Bruins	2-1	Ottawa Senators		Leclaire	2-4-0	

== Regular season ==
The Senators started the season with several changes from the previous season. Heatley was traded, Christoph Schubert was demoted to Binghamton and eventually waived to Atlanta; Brian Lee who had played most of the previous season with Ottawa, was also demoted. Newcomers included Michalek and Cheechoo from the Heatley trade, Kovalev, a free agent signing, and Matt Carkner and Erik Karlsson made the team on defence. Before the end of October, Karlsson was demoted to Binghamton and Lee promoted to Ottawa. First round pick Jared Cowen was returned to junior. Ilya Zubov failed to make the team and was demoted to Binghamton. Zubov first demanded a trade, then accepted a contract reassignment to Salavat Yulaev Ufa of the Kontinental Hockey League (KHL). The Senators retain his NHL rights.

In December, the Senators started to run into a streak of injuries. By the end of the month, the entire top line of Michalek, Spezza and Alfredsson was out with injuries.

On January 13, 2010, the Senators fired their goaltending coach, Eli Wilson. In the weeks prior to his firing, both Pascal Leclaire and Brian Elliott had poor outings. After the firing, the Senators went on a franchise and all-time team record win streak. The previous record of the current NHL franchise was eight games, set in 2007–08. The Senators passed that on January 30, with a win over the Canadiens. The Senators then passed their all-time record of ten consecutive wins (set twice — in 1908–09 and 1910) with a win over the Vancouver Canucks on February 4. The streak ended on February 6 with a loss to the Maple Leafs.

On February 12, the Senators made two moves. The club extended Bryan Murray's contract by a year and the club traded for Matt Cullen from the Carolina Hurricanes for Alexandre Picard and a second-round pick in the 2010 NHL entry draft. Following the trade, Jonathan Cheechoo was assigned to Binghamton after clearing NHL waivers.

=== Standings ===
Northeast Division
		GP	W	L	OTL	GF	GA	Pts
**1**	**y – Buffalo Sabres**	**82**	**45**	**27**	**10**	**235**	**207**	**100**
**2**	**Ottawa Senators**	**82**	**44**	**32**	**6**	**225**	**238**	**94**
**3**	**Boston Bruins**	**82**	**39**	**30**	**13**	**206**	**200**	**91**
**4**	**Montreal Canadiens**	**82**	**39**	**33**	**10**	**217**	**223**	**88**
5	Toronto Maple Leafs	82	30	38	14	214	263	74

Eastern Conference
R		Div	GP	W	L	OTL	GF	GA	Pts
**1**	**p – Washington Capitals**	**SE**	**82**	**54**	**15**	**13**	**318**	**233**	121
**2**	**y – New Jersey Devils**	**AT**	**82**	**48**	**27**	**7**	**222**	**191**	103
**3**	**y – Buffalo Sabres**	**NE**	**82**	**45**	**27**	**10**	**235**	**207**	100
**4**	**Pittsburgh Penguins**	**AT**	**82**	**47**	**28**	**7**	**257**	**237**	101
**5**	**Ottawa Senators**	**NE**	**82**	**44**	**32**	**6**	**225**	**238**	94
**6**	**Boston Bruins**	**NE**	**82**	**39**	**30**	**13**	**206**	**200**	91
**7**	**Philadelphia Flyers**	**AT**	**82**	**41**	**35**	**6**	**236**	**225**	88
**8**	**Montreal Canadiens**	**NE**	**82**	**39**	**33**	**10**	**217**	**223**	88
8.5
9	New York Rangers	AT	82	38	33	11	222	218	87
10	Atlanta Thrashers	SE	82	35	34	13	234	256	83
11	Carolina Hurricanes	SE	82	35	37	10	230	256	80
12	Tampa Bay Lightning	SE	82	34	36	12	217	260	80
13	New York Islanders	AT	82	34	37	11	222	264	79
14	Florida Panthers	SE	82	32	37	13	208	244	77
15	Toronto Maple Leafs	NE	82	30	38	14	214	267	74

bold – Qualified for playoffs; y – Won division; p – Won Presidents' Trophy (and division)

AT – Atlantic Division, NE – Northeast Division, SE – Southeast Division

=== Game log ===
2009–10 game log
October: 6–4–2 (Home: 3-2-2; Road: 3-2-0)

Game	Date	Opponent	Score	Location/attendance	Decision	Record	Recap
1	October 3	@ New York Rangers	2 – 5	Madison Square Garden (18,200)	Leclaire	0–1–0	
2	October 6	@ Toronto Maple Leafs	2 – 1	Air Canada Centre (18,830)	Leclaire	1–1–0	
3	October 8	New York Islanders	3 – 2 (OT)	Scotiabank Place (18,075)	Leclaire	2-1-0	
4	October 10	Atlanta Thrashers	4 – 2	Scotiabank Place (19,360)	Elliott	3-1-0	
5	October 12	Pittsburgh Penguins	1 – 4	Scotiabank Place (17,014)	Leclaire	3–2–0	
6	October 15	Tampa Bay Lightning	7 – 1	Scotiabank Place (17,732)	Leclaire	4–2–0	
7	October 17	@ Montreal Canadiens	3 – 1	Bell Centre (21,273)	Leclaire	5–2–0	
8	October 22	Nashville Predators	5 – 6 (OT)	Scotiabank Place (18,970)	Leclaire	5–2–1	
9	October 24	Boston Bruins	3 – 4 (SO)	Scotiabank Place (20,154)	Elliott	5–2–2	
10	October 28	@ Florida Panthers	4 – 3	BankAtlantic Center (12,596)	Leclaire	6–2–2	
11	October 29	@ Tampa Bay Lightning	2 – 5	St. Pete Times Forum (13,213)	Elliott	6–3–2	
12	October 31	Atlanta Thrashers	1 – 3	Scotiabank Place (17,297)	Leclaire	6–4–2	

November: 7-3-2 (Home: 7-1-1; Road: 0-2-1)

Game	Date	Opponent	Score	Location/attendance	Decision	Record	Recap
13	November 5	Tampa Bay Lightning	3 – 2 (OT)	Scotiabank Place (17,511)	Leclaire	7–4–2	
14	November 7	New Jersey Devils	2 – 3	Scotiabank Place (18,781)	Leclaire	7–5–2	
15	November 10	Edmonton Oilers	4 – 3 (SO)	Scotiabank Place (17,977)	Leclaire	8–5–2	
16	November 12	@ Philadelphia Flyers	1 – 5	Wachovia Center (19,321)	Leclaire	8–6–2	
17	November 14	New York Rangers	1 – 2 (SO)	Scotiabank Place (17,561)	Elliott	8–6–3	
18	November 17	Toronto Maple Leafs	3 – 2	Scotiabank Place (17,406)	Leclaire	9–6–3	
19	November 19	Pittsburgh Penguins	6 – 2	Scotiabank Place (17,039)	Leclaire	10–6–3	
20	November 21	Buffalo Sabres	5 – 3	Scotiabank Place (17,206)	Elliott	11–6–3	
21	November 23	Washington Capitals	4 – 3 (OT)	Scotiabank Place (16,210)	Elliott	12-6-3	
22	November 25	@ New Jersey Devils	1 – 3	Prudential Center (14,056)	Elliott	12-7-3	
23	November 26	Columbus Blue Jackets	2 – 1	Scotiabank Place (19,244)	Elliott	13–7–3	
24	November 28	@ Boston Bruins	3 – 4 (SO)	TD Garden (17,565)	Elliott	13-7-4	

December: 8-9-0 (Home: 5-3-0; Road: 3-6-0)

Game	Date	Opponent	Score	Location/attendance	Decision	Record	Recap
25	December 1	@ San Jose Sharks	2 – 5	HP Pavilion (17,562)	Elliott	13-8-4	
26	December 3	@ Los Angeles Kings	3 – 6	Staples Center (14,997)	Elliott	13-9-4	
27	December 5	@ Phoenix Coyotes	2 – 3	Jobing.com Arena (8,642)	Elliott	13-10-4	
28	December 6	@ Anaheim Ducks	4 – 3 (SO)	Honda Center (14,946)	Elliott	14–10–4	
29	December 8	Montreal Canadiens	1 – 4	Scotiabank Place (18,866)	Elliott	14-11-4	
30	December 10	@ Philadelphia Flyers	2 – 0	Wachovia Center (19,706)	Elliott	15-11-4	
31	December 12	Carolina Hurricanes	4 – 2	Scotiabank Place (16,229)	Elliott	16-11-4	
32	December 14	@ Toronto Maple Leafs	2 – 3	Air Canada Centre (19,315)	Elliott	16-12-4	
33	December 16	Buffalo Sabres	2 – 0	Scotiabank Place (16,917)	Elliott	17-12-4	
34	December 18	@ New Jersey Devils	2 – 4	Prudential Center (13,728)	Elliott	17-13-4	
35	December 19	Minnesota Wild	4 – 1	Scotiabank Place (16,259)	Brodeur	18-13-4	
36	December 21	Boston Bruins	0 – 2	Scotiabank Place (19,865)	Elliott	18-14-4	
37	December 23	@ Pittsburgh Penguins	2 – 8	Mellon Arena (17,132)	Elliott	18-15-4	
38	December 26	@ Buffalo Sabres	3 – 2 (SO)	HSBC Arena (18,690)	Leclaire	19-15-4	
39	December 28	Montreal Canadiens	4 – 2	Scotiabank Place (20,369)	Leclaire	20-15-4	
40	December 30	Colorado Avalanche	3 – 4	Scotiabank Place (17,823)	Leclaire	20–16–4	
41	December 31	New York Islanders	3 – 2 (SO)	Scotiabank Place (16,743)	Leclaire	21–16–4	

January: 10-5-0 (Home: 5-2-0; Road: 5-3-0)

Game	Date	Opponent	Score	Location/attendance	Decision	Record	Recap
42	January 3	Philadelphia Flyers	7 – 4	Scotiabank Place (17,153)	Elliott	22–16–4	
43	January 5	Boston Bruins	1 – 4	Scotiabank Place (19,156)	Elliott	22-17-4	
44	January 7	@ Washington Capitals	2 – 5	Verizon Center (18,277)	Leclaire	22-18-4	
45	January 9	Florida Panthers	0 – 3	Scotiabank Place (16,506)	Elliott	22-19-4	
46	January 10	@ Carolina Hurricanes	1 – 4	RBC Center (16,892)	Leclaire	22-20-4	
47	January 12	@ Atlanta Thrashers	1 – 6	Philips Arena (10,017)	Leclaire	22–21–4	
48	January 14	@ New York Rangers	2 – 0	Madison Square Garden (18,200)	Brodeur	23–21–4	
49	January 16	@ Montreal Canadiens	4 – 2	Bell Centre (21,273)	Brodeur	24–21–4	
50	January 18	@ Boston Bruins	5 – 1	TD Garden (17,565)	Elliott	25–21–4	
51	January 19	Chicago Blackhawks	4 – 1	Scotiabank Place (17,556)	Elliott	26–21–4	
52	January 21	St. Louis Blues	3 – 2	Scotiabank Place (16,063)	Elliott	27–21–4	
53	January 23	@ Boston Bruins	2 – 1	TD Garden (17,565)	Elliott	28–21–4	
54	January 26	New Jersey Devils	3 – 0	Scotiabank Place (18,107)	Elliott	29–21–4	
55	January 28	@ Pittsburgh Penguins	4 – 1	Mellon Arena (17,084)	Elliott	30–21–4	
56	January 30	Montreal Canadiens	3 – 2	Scotiabank Place (20,500)	Elliott	31–21–4	

February: 5-2-0 (Home: 3-0-0; Road: 2-2-0)

Game	Date	Opponent	Score	Location/attendance	Decision	Record	Recap
57	February 3	@ Buffalo Sabres	4 – 2	HSBC Arena (18,690)	Elliott	32–21–4	
58	February 4	Vancouver Canucks	3 – 1	Scotiabank Place (18,803)	Elliott	33–21–4	
59	February 6	@ Toronto Maple Leafs	0 – 5	Air Canada Centre (19,426)	Elliott	33–22–4	
60	February 9	Calgary Flames	3 – 2	Scotiabank Place (18,682)	Elliott	34-22-4	
61	February 11	Washington Capitals	6 – 5	Scotiabank Place (19,682)	Elliott	35-22-4	
62	February 13	@ Detroit Red Wings	1 – 4	Joe Louis Arena (20,066)	Elliott	35-23-4	
63	February 14	@ New York Islanders	4 – 3	Nassau Veterans Memorial Coliseum (11,297)	Elliott	36-23-4	

March: 6-7-1 (Home: 2-2-1; Road: 4-5-0)

Game	Date	Opponent	Score	Location/attendance	Decision	Record	Recap
64	March 2	New York Rangers	1 – 4	Scotiabank Place (18,254)	Elliott	36-24-4	
65	March 4	@ Carolina Hurricanes	1 – 4	RBC Center (17,048)	Leclaire	36-25-4	
66	March 6	Toronto Maple Leafs	1 – 2 (SO)	Scotiabank Place (20,036)	Leclaire	36-25-5	
67	March 9	@ Edmonton Oilers	4 – 1	Rexall Place (16,839)	Elliott	37-25-5	
68	March 11	@ Calgary Flames	0 – 2	Pengrowth Saddledome (19,289)	Elliott	37-26-5	
69	March 13	@ Vancouver Canucks	1 – 5	General Motors Place (18,810)	Leclaire	37-27-5	
70	March 16	Toronto Maple Leafs	4 – 1	Scotiabank Place (20,405)	Elliott	37-28-5	
71	March 18	@ Atlanta Thrashers	3 – 6	Philips Arena (12,718)	Elliott	37-29-5	
72	March 20	@ Dallas Stars	4 – 5	American Airlines Arena (17,110)	Leclaire	37-30-5	
73	March 22	@ Montreal Canadiens	2 – 0	Bell Centre (21,273)	Elliott	38-30-5	
74	March 23	Philadelphia Flyers	2 – 0	Scotiabank Place (19,209)	Elliott	39-30-5	
75	March 26	@ Buffalo Sabres	4 – 2	HSBC Arena (18,690)	Elliott	40-30-5	
76	March 27	Florida Panthers	3 – 2	Scotiabank Place (18,689)	Elliott	41-30-5	
77	March 30	@ Washington Capitals	5 – 4 (OT)	Verizon Center (18,277)	Elliott	42-30-5	

April: 2–2–1 (Home: 1–1–0; Road: 1–1–1)

Game	Date	Opponent	Score	Location/attendance	Decision	Record	Recap
78	April 1	Carolina Hurricanes	4 – 3 (SO)	Scotiabank Place (19,152)	Elliott	43-30-5	
79	April 3	@ New York Islanders	1 – 4	Nassau Veterans Memorial Coliseum (11,942)	Elliott	43-31-5	
80	April 6	@ Florida Panthers	5 – 2	BankAtlantic Center (11,790)	Leclaire	44-31-5	
81	April 8	@ Tampa Bay Lightning	3 – 4 (SO)	St. Pete Times Forum (15,876)	Elliott	44-31-6	
82	April 10	Buffalo Sabres	2 – 5	Scotiabank Place (20,500)	Leclaire	44–32–6	

2009–10 Schedule
**Legend**:

Win (2 points) Loss (0 points) Overtime/shootout loss (1 point)

== Playoffs ==
After failing to qualify in 2008–09, the Senators clinched a spot in the 2010 Stanley Cup playoffs on April 1, 2010 with a 4-3 shootout win at home against the Carolina Hurricanes. Previous media predictions of where the Senators would end up ranged from fourth in the conference to out of the playoffs. The Hockey News had placed the Senators ninth in the conference, while ESPN's John Buccigross predicted the Senators would end up in eleventh. Las Vegas odds had put the odds of the Senators winning the Cup at 35–1.

The Senators drew the defending champion Penguins as first-round opponents for the third time in the past four years. After the Senators won the first game in Pittsburgh, the Penguins took the next three to take a commanding 3–1 lead in the series. The Senators won the fifth game in triple overtime to force a sixth game in Ottawa. In the sixth game, the Senators took a 3–0 lead before the Penguins rallied to win the deciding game 4–3 in overtime to end the Senators season.

Senators vs. Penguins

Game	Date	Score	Location (attendance)	Decision	Record	Recap
1	April 14	5 – 4	Mellon Arena (17,132)	Elliott	1–0	
2	April 16	1 – 2	Mellon Arena (17,132)	Elliott	1–1	
3	April 18	2 – 4	Scotiabank Place (20,119)	Elliott	1–2	
4	April 20	4 – 7	Scotiabank Place (20,014)	Leclaire	1–3	
5	April 22	4 – 3 (3OT)	Mellon Arena (17,132)	Leclaire	2–3	
6	April 24	3 – 4 (1OT)	Scotiabank Place (20,122)	Leclaire	2–4	

== Player statistics ==
=== Skaters ===
Regular season

Player	GP	G	A	Pts	+/−	PIM
Daniel Alfredsson	70	20	51	71	8	22
Jason Spezza	60	23	34	57	-1	20
Mike Fisher	79	25	28	53	1	59
Alexei Kovalev	77	18	31	49	-8	54
Milan Michalek	66	22	12	34	-12	18
Chris Kelly	81	15	17	32	-7	38
Peter Regin	75	13	16	29	10	20
Filip Kuba	53	3	25	28	-5	28
Jarkko Ruutu	82	12	14	26	-2	121
Nick Foligno	61	9	17	26	6	53
Erik Karlsson	60	5	21	26	-5	24
Chris Phillips	82	8	16	24	8	45
Chris Neil	68	10	12	22	-1	175
Chris Campoli	67	4	14	18	-3	16
Ryan Shannon	66	5	11	16	-12	20
Alexandre Picard^{‡}	45	4	11	15	-2	20
Jonathan Cheechoo	61	5	9	14	-13	20
Anton Volchenkov	64	4	10	14	2	38
Jesse Winchester	52	2	11	13	-1	22
Matt Carkner	81	2	9	11	0	190
Matt Cullen^{†}	21	4	4	8	-7	8
Shean Donovan	30	2	3	5	-4	40
Brian Lee	23	2	1	3	-5	12
Zack Smith	15	2	1	3	2	14
Andy Sutton^{†}	18	1	0	1	-7	34
Martin St. Pierre	3	0	0	0	-2	0
Josh Hennessy	4	0	0	0	-1	0
Ryan Keller	6	0	0	0	-1	0
Kaspars Daugavins	1	0	0	0	0	0
Derek Smith	2	0	0	0	-4	0
Jared Cowen	1	0	0	0	0	2
Bobby Butler	2	0	0	0	-1	0

Playoffs

Player	GP	G	A	Pts	+/−	PIM
Matt Cullen	6	3	5	8	-3	0
Daniel Alfredsson	6	2	6	8	-2	2
Jason Spezza	6	1	6	7	-3	4
Chris Kelly	6	1	5	6	1	2
Erik Karlsson	6	1	5	6	-4	4
Mike Fisher	6	2	3	5	-2	6
Chris Neil	6	3	1	4	1	20
Peter Regin	6	3	1	4	-1	6
Jarkko Ruutu	6	2	1	3	2	34
Anton Volchenkov	6	0	2	2	-2	4
Chris Campoli	6	0	2	2	1	4
Matt Carkner	6	1	0	1	0	12
Nick Foligno	6	0	1	1	-1	2
Milan Michalek	1	0	0	0	0	0
Jonathan Cheechoo	1	0	0	0	0	0
Ryan Shannon	2	0	0	0	0	0
Chris Phillips	6	0	0	0	-2	4
Andy Sutton	6	0	0	0	-2	8
Zack Smith	6	0	0	0	-4	5
Jesse Winchester	6	0	0	0	-3	0
Shean Donovan	2	0	0	0	-1	0

=== Goaltenders ===
Regular season

Player	GP	Min	W	L	OTL	GA	GAA	SA	Sv%	SO	G	A	PIM
Brian Elliott	55	3038	29	18	4	130	2.57	1424	.909	5	0	1	0
Pascal Leclaire	34	1745	12	14	2	93	3.20	822	.887	0	0	0	2
Mike Brodeur	3	180	3	0	0	3	1.00	87	.966	1	0	0	0

Playoffs

Player	GP	Min	W	L	GA	GAA	SA	Sv%	SO	G	A	PIM
Pascal Leclaire	3	211	1	2	10	2.84	125	.920	0	0	0	0
Brian Elliott	4	203	1	2	14	4.14	95	.853	0	0	0	0

^{†}Denotes player spent time with another team before joining Senators. Stats reflect time with Senators only.
^{‡}Traded mid-season.

Note:

Pos = Position;GP = Games played; G = Goals; A = Assists; Pts = Points; PIM = Penalty minutes; +/- = Plus/minus; PPG = Power-play goals; SHG = Short-handed goals; GWG = Game-winning goals
Pos = Position;GP = Games played; Min, TOI = Minutes played; W = Wins; L = Losses; T,T/OT = Ties; OTL = Overtime losses; GA = Goals-against; GAA = Goals-against average; SO = Shutouts; SA = Shots against; SV = Shots saved;SV% = Save percentage;

== Awards and records ==
=== Milestones ===
Date	Player	Milestone
October 3, 2009	Erik Karlsson	First NHL game First NHL assist First NHL point
October 8, 2009	Matt Carkner	First NHL goal
October 8, 2009	Jarkko Ruutu	500th NHL game
October 12, 2009	Chris Neil	1,300th NHL PIM
October 15, 2009	Milan Michalek	First NHL career hat trick
November 5, 2009	Pascal Leclaire	50th NHL win
November 7, 2009	Jarkko Ruutu	900th NHL PIM
November 7, 2009	Chris Campoli	100th NHL point
November 7, 2009	Jarkko Ruutu	900th NHL PIM
November 19, 2009	Milan Michalek	100th NHL goal
November 19, 2009	Chris Phillips	800th NHL game
November 19, 2009	Alexandre Picard	50th NHL point 50th NHL PIM
November 21, 2009	Chris Kelly	50th NHL goal
November 25, 2009	Ryan Keller	First NHL game
November 26, 2009	Chris Kelly	200th NHL PIM
November 28, 2009	Nick Foligno	50th NHL point
December 3, 2009	Chris Phillips	600th NHL PIM
December 12, 2009	Alex Kovalev	400th NHL goal
December 14, 2009	Filip Kuba	200th NHL assist
December 14, 2009	Brian Elliott	50th NHL game
December 19, 2009	Mike Fisher	300th NHL point
December 19, 2009	Jonathan Cheechoo	300th NHL point
December 19, 2009	Jarkko Ruutu	50th NHL goal
December 19, 2009	Erik Karlsson	First NHL goal
December 19, 2009	Mike Brodeur	First NHL game First NHL start First NHL win
January 5, 2010	Milan Michalek	200th NHL PIM
January 12, 2010	Shean Donovan	700th NHL PIM
January 14, 2010	Mike Brodeur	First NHL shutout
January 26, 2010	Chris Campoli	300th NHL game
February 9, 2010	Jonathan Cheechoo	500th NHL game
February 11, 2010	Mike Fisher	600th NHL game
February 13, 2010	Derek Smith	First NHL game
March 4, 2010	Daniel Alfredsson	600th NHL assist
March 27, 2010	Chris Kelly	400th NHL game
April 1, 2010	Bobby Butler	First NHL game
April 6, 2010	Daniel Alfredsson	1,000th NHL game
Date	Coach	Milestone
March 6, 2010	Cory Clouston	100th NHL game
Date	Team	Milestone
November 17, 2009	Ottawa Senators	1,300th NHL game
March 22, 2010	Ottawa Senators	600th NHL win

=== Awards ===
Regular season
Player	Award	Date
Mike Fisher	NHL Third Star of the Week	November 23, 2009
Brian Elliott	NHL First Star of the Week	January 25, 2010
Brian Elliott	NHL Second Star of the Week	February 1, 2010
Brian Elliott	NHL First Star of the Week	March 29, 2010

=== Records ===
- January 14, 2010 – February 4, 2010: Eleven-game win streak, modern franchise record.
- April 22, 2010: Senators defeat Penguins in triple overtime on a goal by Matt Carkner at 7:06, ending the longest game in modern franchise history.

== Transactions ==
The Senators have been involved in the following transactions during the 2009–10 season.

=== Trades ===
Date	Details
June 27, 2009	To Edmonton Oilers 6th-round pick in 2010	To Ottawa Senators 7th-round pick (191st overall) in 2009
July 8, 2009	To Dallas Stars Alex Auld	To Ottawa Senators 6th-round pick in 2010
September 4, 2009	To Anaheim Ducks Shawn Weller	To Ottawa Senators Jason Bailey
September 12, 2009	To San Jose Sharks Dany Heatley; 5th-round pick in 2010	To Ottawa Senators Jonathan Cheechoo; Milan Michalek; 2nd-round pick in 2010
February 12, 2010	To Carolina Hurricanes Alexandre Picard; 2nd-round pick in 2010	To Ottawa Senators Matt Cullen
March 2, 2010	To New York Islanders 2nd-round pick in 2010	To Ottawa Senators Andy Sutton

=== Free agents acquired ===
Player	Former team	Contract terms
Craig Schira	Vancouver Giants	3 year, 2-way contract
Ryan Keller	Espoo Blues	1 year, 2-way contract
Martin St. Pierre	Boston Bruins	1 year, 2-way contract
Mike Brodeur	Rochester Americans	1 year, 2-way contract
Alexei Kovalev	Montreal Canadiens	2 years, $10 million
Geoff Kinrade	Tampa Bay Lightning	1 year, 2-way contract
Drew Bannister	Kassel Huskies	1 year, 2-way contract
Andy Chiodo	Dinamo Minsk	1 year, 2-way contract
Bobby Butler	University of New Hampshire	2 year entry-level contract
David Dziurzynski	Alberni Valley Bulldogs	3 year entry-level contract

=== Free agents lost ===
Player	New team	Contract terms
Brendan Bell	St. Louis Blues	undisclosed
Mike Comrie	Edmonton Oilers	1 year, $1.125 million
Drew Fata	Boston Bruins	undisclosed
Jeff Glass	Barys Astana (KHL)	-
Jim McKenzie	Johnstown Chiefs (ECHL)	-

=== Claimed via waivers ===
Player	Former team	Date claimed off waivers

=== Lost via waivers ===
Player	New team	Date claimed off waivers
Christoph Schubert	Atlanta Thrashers	October 2, 2009

=== Lost via retirement ===
Player
Jason Smith

=== Player signings ===
Player	Contract terms
Erik Condra	undisclosed
Erik Karlsson	three years
Chris Neil	four years, $8 million
Derek Smith	one year, two-way contract
Jeremy Yablonski	one year, two-way contract
Brian Elliott	two years, $1.7 million
Matt Carkner	two years, $1.4 million contract extension
Jared Cowen	entry-level contract
Ryan Shannon	one year, $625,000 contract extension
Brian Lee	two years, $1.75 million contract extension
Robin Lehner	3 year entry-level contract
Eric Gryba	2 year entry-level contract
Patrick Wiercioch	3 year entry-level contract

== Draft picks ==
The 2009 NHL entry draft was held in Montreal on June 26–27, 2009. Ottawa made the following picks:

Round	Overall pick	Player	Position	Nationality	College/junior/club team (League)
1	9	Jared Cowen	D	Canada	Spokane Chiefs (WHL)
2	39	Jakob Silfverberg	RW/LW	Sweden	Brynas IF (Sweden Junior)
2	46 (from Columbus)	Robin Lehner	G	Sweden	Frolunda HC (Sweden Junior)
4	100	Chris Wideman	D	United States	Miami University (CCHA)
5	130	Mike Hoffman	C/LW	Canada	Drummondville Voltigeurs (QMJHL)
5	146 (from Boston via Phoenix)	Jeff Costello	LW	United States	Cedar Rapids RoughRiders (USHL)
6	160	Corey Cowick	LW	Canada	Ottawa 67's (OHL)
7	190	Brad Peltz	LW	United States	Avon Old Farms (USHS-CT)
7	191 (from Edmonton)	Michael Sdao	D	United States	Lincoln Stars (USHL)

== Farm teams ==
- Binghamton Senators (American Hockey League)
  Don Nachbaur was hired as the new head coach of Binghamton on July 17.
- Elmira Jackals (ECHL)

== See also ==
- 2009–10 NHL season
