= 2010–11 Ottawa Senators season =

NHL hockey team season

2010–11 Ottawa Senators
- Division: 5th Northeast
- Conference: 13th Eastern
- 2010–11 record: 32–40–10
- Home record: 16–20–5
- Road record: 16–20–5
- Goals for: 192
- Goals against: 250

Team information
- General manager: Bryan Murray
- Coach: Cory Clouston
- Captain: Daniel Alfredsson
- Alternate captains: Mike Fisher (Oct.–Feb.); Chris Phillips; Rotating (Feb.–Apr.)
- Arena: Scotiabank Place
- Average attendance: 18,378

Team leaders
- Goals: Jason Spezza (21)
- Assists: Jason Spezza (36)
- Points: Jason Spezza (57)
- Penalty minutes: Chris Neil (210)
- Plus/minus: David Hale (+7)
- Wins: Brian Elliott (13)
- Goals against average: Craig Anderson (2.05)

The 2010–11 Ottawa Senators season was the team's 19th season of operation in the National Hockey League (NHL). The Senators posted a regular season record of 32 wins, 40 losses and 10 overtime/shootout losses for 74 points, failing to qualify for the Stanley Cup playoffs for the second time in three seasons. After falling to last place in the Eastern Conference by the end of January, the Senators started a rebuild, trading away several veterans for draft choices. Head coach Cory Clouston was fired at the end of the season.

== Off-season ==
Early in the off-season, the Senators signed several players including summer development camp attendee Colin Greening on April 28 and Binghamton Senators forward Ryan Keller on May 19, as well as goaltender Mike Brodeur on May 26. After some media speculation, the Senators also bought-out Jonathan Cheechoo's contract on June 29 after he cleared waivers, making Cheechoo a free agent.

At the Entry Draft, the Senators traded their first-round pick to the St. Louis Blues for defenceman David Rundblad, who had been the Blues' first-round pick (17th overall) in the 2009 Draft. Having now previously traded their first, second- and fifth-round picks, the Senators picked Jakub Culek in the third round (76th overall), Marcus Sorensen in the fourth round (106th overall), Mark Stone in the sixth round (178th overall) and Bryce Aneloski in the seventh round (196th overall).

Throughout July, the Senators made various signings. On July 13, they signed Swiss forward and 2004 Senator draft pick Roman Wick to a one-year, entry-level contract, and re-signed Derek Smith to a one-year contract. On July 22, they re-signed forward Cody Bass to a one-year, two-way contract and forward Mike Hoffman to a one-year, entry-level contract.

Having fired Goaltending Coach Eli Wilson in January, the Senators signed former goaltender Rick Wamsley as goaltending coach on July 27. His most recent job was interim head coach of the St. Louis Blues' American Hockey League (AHL) affiliate, the Peoria Rivermen. He had at one time been Pascal Leclaire's goaltending coach with the Columbus Blue Jackets.

On August 5, the Senators re-signed Binghamton defenceman Geoff Kinrade to a one-year, two-way contract as well as signing forward and local prospect Corey Cowick to an entry-level contract. Cowick was an assistant captain with Ottawa's Ontario Hockey League (OHL) team, the Ottawa 67's, and was the Senators' sixth-round pick at the 2009 Draft.

=== Free agents ===
The Senators entered the off-season with four restricted free agents (RFAs): Chris Campoli, Nick Foligno, Peter Regin and Jesse Winchester. The team also had six unrestricted free agents (UFAs): Matt Cullen and Andy Sutton acquired via late 2009–10 season trades; Shean Donovan and Anton Volchenkov, as well as Binghamton players Martin St. Pierre and Josh Hennessy.

Of the four RFAs, all re-signed with the Senators. Winchester and Foligno each signed two-year deals on July 1 and July 21, respectively. Campoli and Regin both filed for arbitration, however they each re-signed before it reached that point. Regin signed a two-year deal on July 29, while Campoli signed a one-year deal on July 30.

Of the six UFAs, none re-signed with the Senators. On July 1, the first day of free agency, Volchenkov signed with the New Jersey Devils while Cullen signed a three-year deal with the Minnesota Wild. On August 2, Sutton signed with the Anaheim Ducks in a two-year deal. Donovan did not sign with any NHL team. St. Pierre and Hennessy both signed with teams overseas.

In terms of acquisitions, the Senators made a notable move in signing former Pittsburgh Penguins defenceman Sergei Gonchar to a three-year deal in the first hours after the July 1 free agency deadline. Other free agency acquisitions include forward Corey Locke, defenceman and enforcer Francis Lessard, defenceman David Hale and defenceman Andre Benoit.

=== Spezza trade speculation ===
In early June, an Ottawa Sun article reported that star centre Jason Spezza was "unhappy" and that there were "indications [he] may have asked for a trade." Though purely speculation, the article prompted various other Ottawa sports media sources to issue their own perspectives. Theories ranged from conjuring up various trade rumours, noting the similarity to the previous year's Dany Heatley trade demand, or to suggesting that it was just "lazy rumor mongering." Meanwhile, the Sun received criticism for its journalistic integrity to the point where they had to defend accusations that they were "anti-Spezza" This did not stop speculation, however, which was emboldened by silence both from Spezza and general manager Bryan Murray.

Spezza finally broke the silence during his annual Celebrity Classic golf tournament on July 20:

I just want to clear up a lot of the talk going on, at no point did I ever demand a trade to Bryan Murray. At the end of the year, I was pretty emotional and upset. I was upset at losing, I was upset at the response I got. I talked to Bryan about it, I see it in the newspapers every year, they talk about me, and I said, if you want to move me, you can move me. I wanna be here, but if he thinks it's best for the team and the city, then he can move me. He told me he wasn't going to move me. To be honest I was happy about it, cause I like being here in Ottawa. It seems like every year it's been talk of "should I get traded, should I not get traded?" My priorities are here in Ottawa, I want to win in Ottawa. It was just a whole lot of hearsay that was going on. I had prior conversations with Bryan, I talked to [head coach] Cory [Clouston], we were all clear on what was going on.

— Jason Spezza,

Further, he expressed regret that the issue had become public at all. "Me and Bryan have talked since then and probably our conversation should have stayed between us", he said. "We probably wouldn't even be talking here today. But it happened and it's a reality." His statement largely settled the rumour, apart from some minor speculation (again by Ottawa Sun columnists) that Spezza had in fact demanded a trade similar to Heatley. However, sources confirmed with Spezza's team members that the situation was "not even close to the Dany situation."

== Pre-season ==
On June 18, the Senators announced that they would play eight pre-season games, which includes three home games, four road games and one neutral site game. The Senators faced the Toronto Maple Leafs three times, and had home-and-home sets against the Montreal Canadiens and New York Rangers. The Senators also played in the 2010 Kraft Hockeyville game in Dundas, Ontario, against the Buffalo Sabres. The game was played on September 28, 2010, at the J.L. Grightmire Market Street Arena.

== Regular season ==
The Senators' regular season schedule was announced on June 22, 2010. The Senators opened the season at home against the Buffalo Sabres on October 8, 2010. The Senators end the season on the road against the Boston Bruins on April 9, 2011.

The Senators' goal for the season was to return to the playoffs for the 13th time in 14 seasons. Media predictions were mostly negative. The Hockey News predicted in their 2010–11 Yearbook that the Senators will finish tenth in the Eastern Conference, thereby missing the playoffs. The Hockey News writer Adam Proteau predicted the Senators will finish ninth in the Conference. The Las Vegas Hilton SportsBook set the odds at 40–1 that the Senators will win the Stanley Cup.

Within a few days of each other, two of the Senators celebrated milestones in wins. On October 22, Daniel Alfredsson scored a hat trick to reach 1,000 points in his career in a win against the Buffalo Sabres. On October 26, Sergei Gonchar played in his 1,000th game in his career. The game saw the Senators set a new team record for fastest two goals. Erik Karlsson and Alexei Kovalev scored only nine seconds apart, breaking the record of ten seconds set in 1995. The Senators defeated the Phoenix Coyotes 5–2.

On November 13, 2010, the 14-year-old daughter of Assistant Coach Luke Richardson died. The team, on a four-game road trip, returned to Ottawa for a "celebration of life" memorial service held at Scotiabank Place on November 17. Five-thousand and six-hundred mourners attended the service, including former NHL players Paul Coffey, Wendel Clark, Doug Gilmour and Tie Domi. The team flew out after the ceremony for a game against the Carolina Hurricanes that night. Richardson took a personal leave from the club. He returned to his duties with the Senators in January.

Another player reached the 1,000-point plateau on November 22 when Alexei Kovalev scored at the 10:00-minute mark of the first period. He became the third Russian player to reach the mark. Kovalev later assisted on the game-winning goal as the Senators prevailed over the Los Angeles Kings at home, 3–2.

The Senators set a new modern franchise record starting in the first period of a game of November 29 against the Edmonton Oilers through the game of December 5 against the New York Rangers. The team went through a scoring drought that lasted 202 minutes and 57 seconds without a goal. The Senators were shut out by the San Jose Sharks and Buffalo Sabres before Chris Kelly broke the streak in the second period of a game against the Rangers.

The Senators' poor performances led to constant rumours of a shakeup right through until December. The rumours were heightened in January after the team went on a lengthy losing streak. Owner Eugene Melnyk, who had remained silent during much of the streak, finally broke his silence in an exclusive interview with the Ottawa Sun. He made it clear that, despite rumours in the media to the contrary, general manager Bryan Murray and Head Coach Cory Clouston would be allowed to finish out their contracts and would not be replaced mid-season. Melnyk also assured the team's fanbase that a "plan [was] now in motion" to return the Senators to the status of Stanley Cup contenders, and that "difficult decisions" would be made in the coming months.

Those "difficult decisions" began on February 10, 2011, when the club traded long-time centre and fan favourite Mike Fisher to the Nashville Predators for a first-round and a conditional draft pick. The trade was met with mixed reaction from the Senators' fanbase. Some viewed it as an important step in the team's rebuilding process, while others were outraged at the loss of a player who was adored within the community. That outrage was most palpable when a local Ottawa radio station suggested that Fisher's new wife Carrie Underwood was largely responsible for his move to Nashville, and subsequently banned the play of her music. Underwood is a country music singer who is based in Nashville, where Fisher had recently begun living during the off-season.

Following the Fisher trade, the Senators traded another lifetime Senator, forward Chris Kelly, to the Boston Bruins in another move which was met with mixed reaction. The team shed salary by trading Jarkko Ruutu and the under-achieving Alexei Kovalev, both of whom were to become unrestricted free agent at season's end, to playoff contenders Anaheim Ducks and Pittsburgh Penguins, respectively.

Struggling goaltender Brian Elliott, a pending restricted free agent, was sent to the Colorado Avalanche in exchange for goalie Craig Anderson, who had also been struggling through an inconsistent season. Anderson, scheduled to become an unrestricted free agent at the end of the season, was auditioned for a possible contract extension by the organization. Ottawa later acquired goaltender Curtis McElhinney on waivers on February 28. With Pascal Leclaire's injury status unknown and future with the team in doubt, the Senators finished their schedule with a vastly different goal-tending tandem than they had begun the season with.

Following speculation that longtime Senators defenceman and looming unrestricted free agent Chris Phillips would be dealt as part of the rebuilding process, the club instead signed him to a three-year extension on February 27, the day before the trade deadline. With a group of inexperienced young defencemen expected to stock the Senators' blueline in 2011–12, Phillips' experience was deemed an important asset. Defenceman Chris Campoli was traded on deadline day to the Chicago Blackhawks for forward Ryan Potulny and a conditional second-round draft pick, as Ottawa's rebuilding process continued.

For the rest of the season, the Senators rotated call-ups from Binghamton. On March 21, after 11 games with Ottawa, Craig Anderson was signed to a four-year extension by GM Murray. After media speculation on the future of Murray within the organization, Murray re-signed as general manager on April 8 to a three-year extension. After the final game of the season on April 9, Murray dismissed Cory Clouston and his assistant coaches.

== Standings ==
Northeast Division
		GP	W	L	OTL	ROW	GF	GA	Pts
**1**	**y – Boston Bruins**	**82**	**46**	**25**	**11**	**44**	**246**	**195**	**103**
**2**	**Montreal Canadiens**	**82**	**44**	**30**	**8**	**41**	**216**	**209**	**96**
**3**	**Buffalo Sabres**	**82**	**43**	**29**	**10**	**38**	**245**	**229**	**96**
4	Toronto Maple Leafs	82	37	34	11	32	218	251	85
5	Ottawa Senators	82	32	40	10	30	192	250	74

Eastern Conference
R		Div	GP	W	L	OTL	ROW	GF	GA	Pts
**1**	**z – Washington Capitals**	**SE**	**82**	**48**	**23**	**11**	**43**	**224**	**197**	107
**2**	**y – Philadelphia Flyers**	**AT**	**82**	**47**	**23**	**12**	**44**	**259**	**223**	106
**3**	**y – Boston Bruins**	**NE**	**82**	**46**	**25**	**11**	**44**	**246**	**195**	103
**4**	**Pittsburgh Penguins**	**AT**	**82**	**49**	**25**	**8**	**39**	**238**	**199**	106
**5**	**Tampa Bay Lightning**	**SE**	**82**	**46**	**25**	**11**	**40**	**247**	**240**	103
**6**	**Montreal Canadiens**	**NE**	**82**	**44**	**30**	**8**	**41**	**216**	**209**	96
**7**	**Buffalo Sabres**	**NE**	**82**	**43**	**29**	**10**	**38**	**245**	**229**	96
**8**	**New York Rangers**	**AT**	**82**	**44**	**33**	**5**	**35**	**233**	**198**	93
8.5
9	Carolina Hurricanes	SE	82	40	31	11	35	236	239	91
10	Toronto Maple Leafs	NE	82	37	34	11	32	218	251	85
11	New Jersey Devils	AT	82	38	39	5	35	174	209	81
12	Atlanta Thrashers	SE	82	34	36	12	29	223	269	80
13	Ottawa Senators	NE	82	32	40	10	30	192	250	74
14	New York Islanders	AT	82	30	39	13	26	229	264	73
15	Florida Panthers	SE	82	30	40	12	26	195	229	72

bold – qualified for playoffs; y – Won division; z – Placed first in conference (and division)
AT – Atlantic Division, NE – Northeast Division, SE – Southeast Division

== Schedule and results ==
=== Pre-season ===
2010 Pre-season

#	Date	Visitor	Score	Home	OT	Decision	Record
1	September 21	Ottawa Senators	5–0	Toronto Maple Leafs		Lehner	1–0–0
2	September 22	Ottawa Senators	1–4	Toronto Maple Leafs		Elliott	1–1–0
3	September 24	Ottawa Senators	2–4	Montreal Canadiens		Leclaire	1–2–0
4	September 25	Montreal Canadiens	2–6	Ottawa Senators		Elliott	2–2–0
5	September 28 (in Dundas, Ontario)	Buffalo Sabres	2–1	Ottawa Senators		Lehner	2–3–0
6	September 29	Toronto Maple Leafs	4–3	Ottawa Senators		Leclaire	2–4–0
7	October 1	Ottawa Senators	4–5	New York Rangers	SO	Elliott	2–4–1
8	October 2	New York Rangers	5-8	Ottawa Senators		Leclaire	3–4–1

=== Regular season ===
2010–11 season
October: (11) (home: 6; road: 5) (record: 4–6–1; home: 3–3–0; road: 1–3–1)

Game	October	Opponent	Score	Location (attendance)	Record	Decision	Points	Recap
1	8	Buffalo Sabres	1 – 2	Scotiabank Place (19,350)	0–1–0	Leclaire	0	
2	9	@ Toronto Maple Leafs	1 – 5	Air Canada Centre (19,157)	0–2–0	Leclaire	0	
3	11	@ Washington Capitals	2 – 3 (OT)	Verizon Center (18,398)	0–2–1	Leclaire	1	
4	14	Carolina Hurricanes	3 – 2	Scotiabank Place (16,270)	1–2–1	Elliott	3	
5	16	@ Montreal Canadiens	3 – 4	Bell Centre (21,273)	1–3–1	Elliott	3	
6	18	@ Pittsburgh Penguins	2 – 5	Consol Energy Center (18,101)	1–4–1	Elliott	3	
7	22	@ Buffalo Sabres	4 – 2	HSBC Arena (18,009)	2–4–1	Elliott	5	
8	23	Montreal Canadiens	0 – 3	Scotiabank Place (20,301)	2–5–1	Elliott	5	
9	26	Phoenix Coyotes	5 – 2	Scotiabank Place (16,686)	3–5–1	Elliott	7	
10	28	Florida Panthers	5 – 3	Scotiabank Place (16,294)	4–5–1	Elliott	9	
11	30	Boston Bruins	0 – 3	Scotiabank Place (18,959)	4–6–1	Elliott	9	

November: (14) (home: 7; road: 7) (record: 7–7–0; home: 4–3–0; road: 3–4–0)

Game	November	Opponent	Score	Location/attendance	Record	Decision	Points	Recap
12	2	@ Toronto Maple Leafs	3 – 2	Air Canada Centre (19,409)	5–6–1	Elliott	11	
13	4	New York Islanders	4 – 1	Scotiabank Place (17,752)	6–6–1	Elliott	13	
14	6	@ Montreal Canadiens	3 – 2	Bell Centre (21,273)	7–6–1	Elliott	15	
15	9	Atlanta Thrashers	5 – 2	Scotiabank Place (16,583)	8–6–1	Elliott	17	
16	11	Vancouver Canucks	2 – 6	Scotiabank Place (19,191)	8–7–1	Leclaire	17	
17	13	@ Boston Bruins	2 – 0	TD Garden (17,565)	9–7–1	Elliott	19	
18	15	@ Philadelphia Flyers	1 – 5	Wells Fargo Center (19,256)	9–8–1	Elliott	19	
19	17	@ Carolina Hurricanes	1 – 7	RBC Center (12,938)	9–9–1	Elliott	19	
20	19	@ St. Louis Blues	2 – 5	Scottrade Center (19,150)	9-10-1	Elliott	19	
21	22	Los Angeles Kings	3 – 2	Scotiabank Place (18,315)	10-10-1	Leclaire	21	
22	24	Dallas Stars	1 – 2	Scotiabank Place (16,281)	10–11–1	Leclaire	21	
23	26	@ Pittsburgh Penguins	1 – 2	Consol Energy Center (18,299)	10–12–1	Leclaire	21	
24	27	Toronto Maple Leafs	3 – 0	Scotiabank Place (20,275)	11–12–1	Elliott	23	
25	29	Edmonton Oilers	1 – 4	Scotiabank Place (17,002)	11–13–1	Elliott	23	

December: (14) (home: 8; road: 6) (record: 5–5–4; home: 2–4–2; road: 3–1–2)

Game	December	Opponent	Score	Location/attendance	Record	Decision	Points	Recap
26	2	San Jose Sharks	0 – 4	Scotiabank Place (18,017)	11–14–1	Leclaire	23	
27	4	Buffalo Sabres	0 – 1 (SO)	Scotiabank Place (16,364)	11–14–2	Elliott	24	
28	5	@ New York Rangers	3 – 1	Madison Square Garden (18,200)	12–14–2	Leclaire	26	
29	7	@ Montreal Canadiens	1 – 4	Bell Centre (21,273)	12–15–2	Leclaire	26	
30	9	New York Rangers	3 – 5	Scotiabank Place (16,324)	12–16–2	Elliott	26	
31	10	New Jersey Devils	3 – 2	Scotiabank Place (16,471)	13–16–2	Leclaire	28	
32	13	Atlanta Thrashers	3 – 4 (OT)	Scotiabank Place (18,184)	13–16–3	Elliott	29	
33	16	@ Minnesota Wild	3 – 1	Xcel Energy Center (17,366)	14–16–3	Leclaire	31	
34	17	@ Colorado Avalanche	5 – 6 (OT)	Pepsi Center (15,113)	14–16–4	Elliott	32	
35	19	Washington Capitals	2 – 3	Scotiabank Place (19,516)	14–17–4	Elliott	32	
36	23	@ Nashville Predators	2 – 1	Bridgestone Arena ( 17,113)	15–17–4	Elliott	34	
37	26	Pittsburgh Penguins	3 – 1	Scotiabank Place (20,146)	16–17–4	Elliott	36	
38	29	Carolina Hurricanes	0 – 4	Scotiabank Place (20,221)	16–18–4	Elliott	36	
39	31	@ Columbus Blue Jackets	3 – 4 (OT)	Nationwide Arena (17,652)	16–18–5	Elliott	37	

January: (11) (home: 7; road: 4) (record: 1–7–3; home: 0–4–2; road: 1–3–1)

Game	January	Opponent	Score	Location/attendance	Record	Decision	Points	Recap
40	1	Toronto Maple Leafs	1 – 5	Scotiabank Place (20,027)	16–19–5	Elliott	37	
41	7	@ Chicago Blackhawks	2 – 3 (SO)	United Center (21,657)	16–19–6	Elliott	38	
42	8	Tampa Bay Lightning	1 – 2	Scotiabank Place (19,698)	16–20–6	Elliott	38	
43	11	Boston Bruins	0 – 6	TD Garden (17,565)	16–21–6	Elliott	38	
44	13	@ New York Islanders	6 – 4	Nassau Veterans Memorial Coliseum (8,670)	17–21–6	Lehner	40	
45	14	Calgary Flames	2 – 3	Scotiabank Place (19,984)	17–22–6	Elliott	40	
46	16	@ Washington Capitals	1 – 3	Verizon Center (18,398)	17–23–6	Elliott	40	
47	18	Anaheim Ducks	1 – 2 (SO)	Scotiabank Place (19,515)	17–23–7	Elliott	41	
48	20	@ Philadelphia Flyers	2 – 6	Wells Fargo Center (19,721)	17–24–7	Elliott	41	
49	21	Montreal Canadiens	1 – 7	Scotiabank Place (20,337)	17–25–7	Brodeur	41	
50	25	Buffalo Sabres	2 – 3 (OT)	Scotiabank Place (18,990)	17–25–8	Elliott	42	

February: (12) (home: 5; road: 7) (record: 4-7-1; home: 2-2-1; road: 2-5-0)

Game	February	Opponent	Score	Location/attendance	Record	Decision	Points	Recap
51	1	@ New Jersey Devils	1 – 2	Prudential Center (7,218)	17–26–8	Lehner	42	
52	2	Detroit Red Wings	5 – 7	Scotiabank Place (18,011)	17–27–8	Elliott	42	
53	5	@ New York Islanders	3 – 5	Nassau Veterans Memorial Coliseum (10,415)	17–28–8	Lehner	42	
54	7	@ Vancouver Canucks	2 – 4	Rogers Arena (18,860)	17–29–8	Elliott	42	
55	9	@ Calgary Flames	2 – 5	Pengrowth Saddledome (19,289)	17–30–8	Lehner	42	
56	12	@ Edmonton Oilers	5 – 3	Rexall Place (16,839)	18-30-8	Elliott	44	
57	15	New York Islanders	3 – 4 (SO)	Scotiabank Place (17,565)	18-30-9	Elliott	45	
58	18	Boston Bruins	2 – 4	Scotiabank Place (18,521)	18-31-9	Lehner	45	
59	19	@ Toronto Maple Leafs	1 – 0 (SO)	Air Canada Centre (19,460)	19-31-9	Anderson	47	
60	23	Florida Panthers	5 – 1	Scotiabank Place (16,520)	20–31–9	Anderson	49	
61	25	@ Buffalo Sabres	2 – 4	HSBC Arena (18,690)	20–32–9	Anderson	49	
62	26	Philadelphia Flyers	4 – 1	Scotiabank Place (19,934)	21–32–9	Anderson	51	

March: (16) (home: 6; road: 10) (record: 9–6–1; home: 3–3–0; road: 6–3–1)

Game	March	Opponent	Score	Location/attendance	Record	Decision	Points	Recap
63	1	Boston Bruins	0 – 1	Scotiabank Place (16,826)	21–33–9	Anderson	51	
64	3	@ Atlanta Thrashers	3 – 1	Philips Arena (10,461)	22–33–9	Anderson	53	
65	4	New York Rangers	1 – 4	Scotiabank Place (17,497)	22–34–9	Anderson	53	
66	8	@ New Jersey Devils	2 – 1	Prudential Center (15,978)	23–34–9	Anderson	55	
67	10	@ Florida Panthers	2 – 1	BankAtlantic Center (12,310)	24–34–9	Anderson	57	
68	11	@ Tampa Bay Lightning	2 – 1	St. Pete Times Forum (18,777)	25–34–9	McElhinney	59	
69	13	@ Buffalo Sabres	3 – 6	HSBC Arena (18,690)	25–35–9	Anderson	59	
70	15	Pittsburgh Penguins	1 – 5	Scotiabank Place (19,249)	25–36–9	Anderson	59	
71	17	New Jersey Devils	3 – 1	Scotiabank Place (17,758)	26–36–9	McElhinney	61	
72	19	Tampa Bay Lightning	3 – 2 (OT)	Scotiabank Place (18,883)	27–36–9	McElhinney	63	
73	22	@ Carolina Hurricanes	3 – 4	RBC Centre (16,189)	27–37–9	McElhinney	63	
74	24	@ New York Rangers	2 – 1 (SO)	Madison Square Garden (18,200)	28–37–9	Anderson	65	
75	25	Washington Capitals	2 – 0	Scotiabank Place (18,329)	29–37–9	Anderson	67	
76	27	@ Atlanta Thrashers	4 – 5 (SO)	Philips Arena (16,392)	29–37–10	Anderson	68	
77	29	@ Tampa Bay Lightning	2 – 5	St. Pete Times Forum (16,626)	29–38–10	McElhinney	68	
78	31	@ Florida Panthers	4 – 1	BankAtlantic Center (15,672)	30–38–10	Anderson	70	

April: (4) (home: 3; road: 1)

Game	April	Opponent	Score	Location/attendance	Record	Decision	Points	Recap
79	2	Toronto Maple Leafs	2 – 4	Scotiabank Place (19,243)	30–39–10	Anderson	70	
80	5	Philadelphia Flyers	5 – 2	Scotiabank Place (18,397)	31–39–10	Anderson	72	
81	7	Montreal Canadiens	3 – 2 (OT)	Scotiabank Place (19,809)	32–39–10	Anderson	74	
82	9	@ Boston Bruins	1 – 3	Boston Garden (17,565)	32–40–10	McElhinney	74	

Source: Ottawa Senators
Legend:

Win (2 points) Loss (0 points) Overtime/shootout loss (1 point)

== Player statistics ==
=== Skaters ===
Regular season

Player	GP	G	A	Pts	+/−	PIM
Jason Spezza	62	21	36	57	-7	28
Erik Karlsson	75	13	32	45	-30	50
Nick Foligno	82	14	20	34	-19	43
Milan Michalek	66	18	15	33	-12	49
Daniel Alfredsson	54	14	17	31	-19	18
Sergei Gonchar	67	7	20	27	-15	20
Ryan Shannon	79	11	16	27	3	26
Alexei Kovalev^{‡}	54	14	13	27	-9	28
Mike Fisher^{‡}	55	14	10	24	-19	33
Chris Kelly^{‡}	57	12	11	23	-12	27
Bobby Butler	36	10	11	21	-16	10
Peter Regin	55	3	14	17	-4	12
Filip Kuba	64	2	14	16	-26	16
Chris Neil	80	6	10	16	-14	210
Chris Campoli^{‡}	58	3	11	14	-3	34
Colin Greening	24	6	7	13	2	10
Jesse Winchester	72	4	9	13	-9	42
Erik Condra	26	6	5	11	-1	12
Jarkko Ruutu^{‡}	50	2	8	10	-2	59
Zack Smith	55	4	5	9	-11	120
Chris Phillips	82	1	8	9	-35	32
Matt Carkner	50	1	6	7	0	136
David Hale	25	1	4	5	7	6
Marek Svatos^{†}	19	3	2	5	-1	8
Brian Lee	50	0	3	3	-10	24
Patrick Wiercioch	8	0	2	2	0	4
Andre Benoit	8	0	1	1	-1	6
Corey Locke	5	0	1	1	-1	0
Derek Smith	9	0	1	1	3	0
Roman Wick	7	0	0	0	-4	0
Cody Bass	1	0	0	0	0	0
Jim O'Brien	6	0	0	0	-3	2
Francis Lessard	24	0	0	0	0	78
Stephane Da Costa	4	0	0	0	-1	0
Ryan Potulny^{†}	7	0	0	0	0	0

=== Goaltenders ===
Regular season

Player	GP	Min	W	L	OTL	GA	GAA	SA	Sv%	SO	G	A	PIM
Brian Elliott^{‡}	43	2293	13	19	8	122	3.19	1147	.894	3	0	0	0
Craig Anderson^{†}	18	1055	11	5	1	36	2.05	589	.939	2	0	0	0
Pascal Leclaire	14	763	4	7	1	36	2.83	391	.908	0	0	0	0
Curtis McElhinney^{†}	7	399	3	4	0	17	2.56	205	.917	0	0	0	0
Robin Lehner	8	341	1	4	0	20	3.52	178	.888	0	0	0	2
Mike Brodeur	4	97	0	1	0	7	4.33	42	.833	0	0	0	0

^{†}Denotes player spent time with another team before joining Senators. Stats reflect time with Senators only.
^{‡}Traded mid-season.

Note:

Pos = Position;GP = Games played; G = Goals; A = Assists; Pts = Points; PIM = Penalty minutes; +/- = Plus/minus; PPG = Power-play goals; SHG = Short-handed goals; GWG = Game-winning goals
Pos = Position;GP = Games played; Min, TOI = Minutes played; W = Wins; L = Losses; T,T/OT = Ties; OTL = Overtime losses; GA = Goals-against; GAA = Goals-against average; SO = Shutouts; SA = Shots against; SV = Shots saved;SV% = Save percentage;

=== Awards/Milestones ===
- Ryan Shannon – Ottawa Senators' nominee for Bill Masterton Trophy

Milestones

Regular season

Player	Achievement	Date
Robin Lehner	1st NHL game	October 16, 2010
Daniel Alfredsson	1,000th NHL point	October 23, 2010
Sergei Gonchar	1,000th NHL game	October 26, 2010
Jarkko Ruutu	1,000th NHL PIM	October 28, 2010
Brian Elliott	50th NHL win	October 28, 2010
Sergei Gonchar	1st goal w/ Ottawa	November 2, 2010
Nick Foligno	200th NHL game	November 4, 2010
David Hale	1st goal w/ Ottawa	November 4, 2010
Peter Regin	100th NHL game	November 6, 2010
Matt Carkner; Brian Elliott	100th NHL Game	November 13, 2010
Ryan Shannon	200th NHL game	November 19, 2010
Alexei Kovalev	1,000th NHL point	November 22, 2010
Milan Michalek	400th NHL game	November 22, 2010
Chris Neil	600th NHL game	November 22, 2010
Jarkko Ruutu	600th NHL game	November 22, 2010
Chris Kelly	1st NHL hat-trick	December 5, 2010
Jason Spezza	1st NHL penalty shot goal	December 13, 2010
Sergei Gonchar	700th NHL point	December 16, 2010
Chris Phillips	900th NHL game	December 26, 2010
Jim O'Brien	1st NHL game	December 31, 2010
Erik Karlsson	100th NHL game	January 8, 2011
Corey Locke	1st NHL assist 1st NHL point	January 13, 2011
Robin Lehner	1st NHL start 1st NHL win	January 13, 2011
Brian Lee	100th NHL game	January 21, 2011
Colin Greening	1st NHL game	February 1, 2011
Chris Kelly	100th NHL assist	February 5, 2011
Bobby Butler	1st NHL goal 1st NHL assist 1st NHL point	February 12, 2011
Jason Spezza	500th NHL game	February 12, 2011
Erik Condra	1st NHL game 1st NHL assist 1st NHL point	February 15, 2011
Jason Spezza	500th NHL point	February 15, 2011
Andre Benoit	1st NHL game	February 18, 2011
Craig Anderson	1st win w/ Ottawa; 1st shutout w/ Ottawa	February 19, 2011
Colin Greening	1st NHL assist 1st NHL point	February 23, 2011
Roman Wick	1st NHL game	February 25, 2011
Erik Condra	1st NHL goal	February 26, 2011
Filip Kuba	700th NHL game	March 1, 2011
Colin Greening	1st NHL goal	March 3, 2011
Derek Smith	1st NHL assist 1st NHL point	March 3, 2011
Francis Lessard	100th NHL game	March 8, 2011
Sergei Gonchar	500th NHL assist	March 10, 2011
Patrick Wiercioch	1st NHL Game	March 22, 2011
Marek Svatos	1st Goal w/Ottawa	March 22, 2011
Marek Svatos	100th NHL goal	March 27, 2011
Patrick Wiercioch	1st NHL assist 1st NHL point	March 27, 2011
Nick Foligno	100th NHL point	March 31, 2011
Andre Benoit	1st NHL assist 1st NHL point	April 2, 2011
Stephane Da Costa	1st NHL game	April 2, 2011
Jesse Winchester	200th NHL game	April 7, 2011

Regular season

Team	Achievement	Date
Ottawa Senators	4,000th franchise goal	November 9, 2010

== Transactions ==
=== Trades ===
Date	Details
June 25, 2010	To St. Louis Blues 1st-round pick in 2010	To Ottawa Senators David Rundblad
February 10, 2011	To Nashville Predators Mike Fisher	To Ottawa Senators 1st-round draft pick in 2011; Conditional 2nd- or 3rd-round pick in 2012 (Note: Pick became 3rd-round pick.)
February 15, 2011	To Boston Bruins Chris Kelly	To Ottawa Senators 2nd-round pick in 2011
February 17, 2011	To Anaheim Ducks Jarkko Ruutu	To Ottawa Senators 6th-round pick in 2011
February 18, 2011	To Colorado Avalanche Brian Elliott	To Ottawa Senators Craig Anderson
February 24, 2011	To Pittsburgh Penguins Alexei Kovalev	To Ottawa Senators Conditional 7th-round pick in 2011 (Note: Condition satisfied.)
February 28, 2011	To Chicago Blackhawks Chris Campoli; Conditional 7th-round pick in 2012 (Note: Condition not satisfied.)	To Ottawa Senators Ryan Potulny; Conditional 2nd-round pick in 2011 (Note: Condition satisfied.)

=== Free agents acquired ===
Player	Former team	Date	Contract terms
Sergei Gonchar	Pittsburgh Penguins	July 1, 2010	Three years, $16.5 million contract.
Corey Locke	Hartford Wolf Pack	July 7, 2010	Two years, $1.1 million two-way contract.
Roman Wick	Kloten Flyers	July 14, 2010	One year, $625,000 entry-level contract
Francis Lessard	San Antonio Rampage	August 4, 2010	One year, $550,000 two-way contract
David Hale	Tampa Bay Lightning	August 4, 2010	One year, $675,000 two-way contract
Andre Benoit	Hamilton Bulldogs	August 6, 2010	One-year, $550,000 two-way contract
Wacey Hamilton	Medicine Hat Tigers	March 8, 2011	Three years, $2.145 million entry-level contract
Stephane Da Costa	Merrimack College	March 31, 2011	Two years, $1.8 million entry-level contract
Pat Cannone	Miami University	April 8, 2011	One year, $600,000 entry-level contract

=== Free agents lost ===
Player	New team	Contract terms
Josh Hennessy	HC Lugano	1 year
Martin St. Pierre	Neftekhimik Nizhnekamsk	1 year
Jonathan Cheechoo	Worcester Sharks	Contract bought out
Anton Volchenkov	New Jersey Devils	6 years, $25.5 million
Matt Cullen	Minnesota Wild	3 years, $10.5 million
Andy Sutton	Anaheim Ducks	2 years, $4.25 million

=== Claimed via waivers ===
Player	Former team	Date claimed off waivers
Marek Svatos	Nashville Predators	February 24, 2011
Curtis McElhinney	Tampa Bay Lightning	February 28, 2011

=== Lost via waivers ===
Player	New team	Date claimed off waivers

=== Player signings ===
Player	Date	Contract terms
Colin Greening	April 28, 2010	One-year, $735,000 entry-level contract
Ryan Keller	May 19, 2010	One-year, $525,000 two-way contract
Mike Brodeur	May 26, 2010	One-year, $600,000 two-way contract
Jesse Winchester	July 1, 2010	Two-years, $1.5 million
Derek Smith	July 13, 2010	One year, $550,000
Nick Foligno	July 21, 2010	Two-years, $2.4 million
Mike Hoffman	July 22, 2010	Three-years, $1.83 million entry-level contract
Cody Bass	July 22, 2010	One-year, $500,000 two-way contract
Peter Regin	July 29, 2010	Two-years, $2 million
Chris Campoli	July 30, 2010	One-year, $1.4 million
Geoff Kinrade	August 5, 2010	One-year, $550,000 two-way contract
Corey Cowick	August 5, 2010	Three years, $1.835 million entry-level contract
Chris Phillips	February 28, 2011	Three years, $9.25 million contract extension
Derek Grant	March 10, 2011	Three-years, $1.815 million entry-level contract
Mark Borowiecki	March 11, 2011	Two-years, $1.22 million entry-level contract
Craig Anderson	March 21, 2011	Four-years, $12.75 million contract extension
Andre Petersson	April 8, 2011	Three-years, $2.19 million entry-level contract

== Draft picks ==
The 2010 NHL entry draft was held at the Staples Center in Los Angeles June 25–26, 2010.

Round	Overall pick	Player	Position	Nationality	College/junior/club team (League)
3	76	Jakub Culek	LW	Czech Republic	Rimouski Oceanic (QMJHL)
4	106	Marcus Sorensen	RW	Sweden	Sodertalje SK Jr. (J20 SuperElit)
6	178 (from San Jose)	Mark Stone	RW	Canada	Brandon Wheat Kings (WHL)
7	196	Bryce Aneloski	D	United States	Cedar Rapids RoughRiders (USHL)

== Farm teams ==
- Binghamton Senators (American Hockey League (AHL))
- Elmira Jackals (ECHL)

The Senators signed Kurt Kleinendorst to a two-year deal to be head coach of Binghamton. He was previously the head coach of the USA Hockey National Team Development Program, which won the Under-18 World Championship in 2010.

Binghamton qualified for the Calder Cup playoffs for the first time since 2005. After nearly being eliminated in the first round by the Manchester Monarchs, the Senators defeated the Portland Pirates in the second round and swept the Charlotte Checkers in the third round series to advance to the team's first-ever Calder Cup Final. The Senators defeated the Houston Aeros in six games to win the Calder Cup championship. Goaltender Robin Lehner was named the playoffs' Most Valuable Player and received the Jack A. Butterfield Trophy.

== See also ==
- 2010–11 NHL season
