= David Dziurzynski =

Canadian ice hockey player (born 1989)

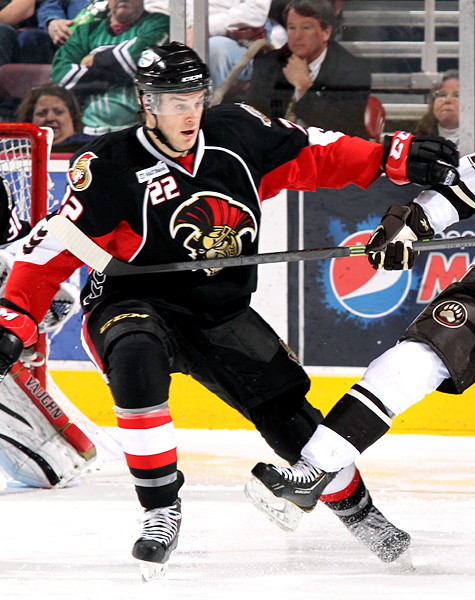
- Dziurzynski with the Binghamton Senators in 2013
- Born: October 6, 1989 (age 37) Lloydminster, Alberta, Canada
- Height: 6 ft 3 in (191 cm)
- Weight: 215 lb (98 kg; 15 st 5 lb)
- Position: Left wing
- Shoots: Left
- ECHL team Former teams: Kansas City Mavericks; Ottawa Senators; Iserlohn Roosters
- NHL draft: Undrafted
- Playing career: 2010–present

David Dziurzynski (born October 6, 1989) is a Canadian professional ice hockey player who is currently playing with the Kansas City Mavericks in the ECHL. He previously played with the Ottawa Senators of the National Hockey League (NHL).

== Playing career ==
Dziurzynski, who played junior in the British Columbia Hockey League with the Alberni Valley Bulldogs, was signed by the Ottawa Senators on April 6, 2010, as an undrafted free agent to a three-year contract.

At training camp in 2010, Dziurzynski made the roster of the Senators' American Hockey League (AHL) affiliate Binghamton Senators. He was a member of the 2011 AHL Calder Cup championship squad. Dziurzynski returned to Binghamton for the 2011–12 and 2012–13 seasons. Dziurzynski made his NHL debut, playing for Ottawa in Toronto against the Toronto Maple Leafs on February 16, 2013. Three days later he scored his first NHL goal against Rick DiPietro of the New York Islanders. And on February 25 scored his second against Carey Price of the Montreal Canadiens. On March 6, 2013, he was knocked out by a punch in a fight against the Toronto Maple Leafs' Frazer McLaren resulting in a concussion that kept him from playing for over 10 days. Dziurzynski was reassigned to Binghamton later that month.

The Ottawa Senators later re-signed Dziurzynski to a one-year, two-way contract on July 10, 2013. On July 3, 2014, the Senators re-signed Dziurzynski to a two-year, two-way contract.

After 6 seasons within the Senators organization, Dziurzynski left as a free agent to sign a one-year contract abroad with German club, Iserlohn Roosters of the Deutsche Eishockey Liga on July 27, 2016.

== Personal ==
Dziurzynski's younger brother, Darian, was selected by the Arizona Coyotes in the fifth round of the 2011 NHL entry draft.

== Career statistics ==
| | | | Regular season | | | | | Playoffs |
| Season | Team | League | GP | G | A | Pts | PIM | GP | G | A | Pts | PIM |
|---|---|---|---|---|---|---|---|---|---|---|---|---|
| 2007–08 | Lloydminster Bobcats | AJHL | 52 | 8 | 12 | 20 | 82 | 3 | 0 | 0 | 0 | 4 |
| 2008–09 | Lloydminster Bobcats | AJHL | 54 | 12 | 25 | 37 | 185 | 4 | 0 | 1 | 1 | 2 |
| 2009–10 | Alberni Valley Bulldogs | BCHL | 57 | 21 | 53 | 74 | 79 | 13 | 9 | 10 | 19 | 8 |
| 2010–11 | Binghamton Senators | AHL | 75 | 6 | 14 | 20 | 57 | 14 | 0 | 3 | 3 | 4 |
| 2011–12 | Binghamton Senators | AHL | 72 | 11 | 17 | 28 | 92 | — | — | — | — | — |
| 2012–13 | Binghamton Senators | AHL | 54 | 4 | 16 | 20 | 110 | 3 | 0 | 1 | 1 | 4 |
| 2012–13 | Ottawa Senators | NHL | 12 | 2 | 0 | 2 | 13 | — | — | — | — | — |
| 2013–14 | Binghamton Senators | AHL | 68 | 13 | 12 | 25 | 91 | 4 | 0 | 1 | 1 | 4 |
| 2014–15 | Binghamton Senators | AHL | 39 | 4 | 10 | 14 | 79 | — | — | — | — | — |
| 2015–16 | Binghamton Senators | AHL | 43 | 8 | 12 | 20 | 73 | — | — | — | — | — |
| 2015–16 | Ottawa Senators | NHL | 14 | 1 | 3 | 4 | 9 | — | — | — | — | — |
| 2016–17 | Iserlohn Roosters | DEL | 50 | 11 | 6 | 17 | 140 | — | — | — | — | — |
| 2017–18 | Florida Everblades | ECHL | 19 | 2 | 1 | 3 | 21 | 18 | 4 | 6 | 10 | 43 |
| 2017–18 | Utica Comets | AHL | 27 | 3 | 3 | 6 | 28 | — | — | — | — | — |
| 2017–18 | Belleville Senators | AHL | 9 | 1 | 3 | 4 | 12 | — | — | — | — | — |
| 2018–19 | Kansas City Mavericks | ECHL | 62 | 18 | 30 | 48 | 96 | — | — | — | — | — |
| 2019–20 | Kansas City Mavericks | ECHL | 55 | 11 | 20 | 31 | 57 | — | — | — | — | — |
| NHL totals | | | 26 | 3 | 3 | 6 | 22 | — | — | — | — | — |

== Awards and honours ==
| Awards | Year |
|---|---|
AHL
| Calder Cup (Binghamton Senators) | 2011 |
