= Craig Schira =

Canadian ice hockey player

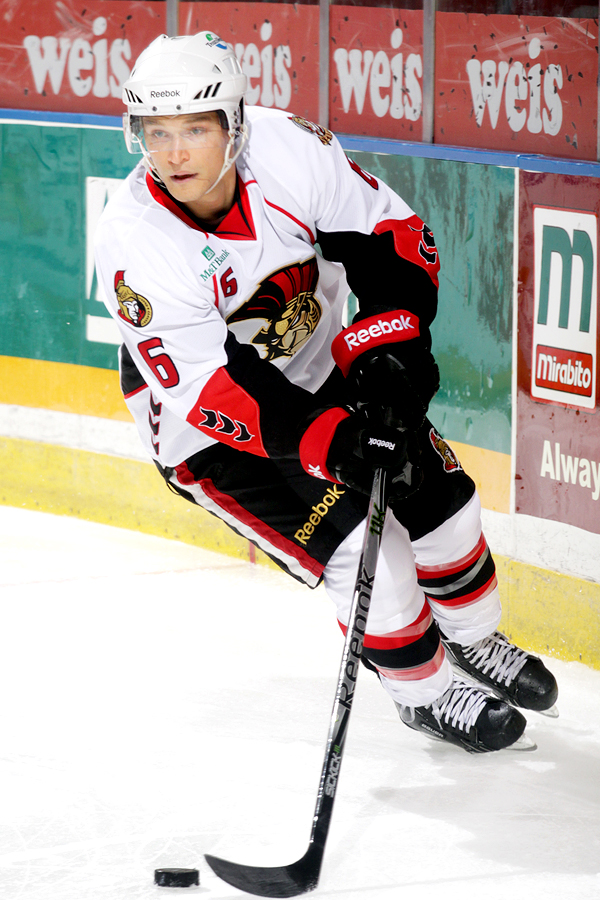
- Schira with the Binghamton Senators in 2011
- Born: April 21, 1988 (age 38) Spiritwood, Saskatchewan, Canada
- Height: 6 ft 0 in (183 cm)
- Weight: 195 lb (88 kg; 13 st 13 lb)
- Position: Defence
- Shoots: Right
- team Former teams: Free Agent; Binghamton Senators; Frisk Asker; HPK; Luleå HF; Rögle BK; HV71; Adler Mannheim; Linköping HC
- NHL draft: Undrafted
- Playing career: 2009–present

Craig Schira (born April 21, 1988) is a Canadian professional ice hockey defenceman. He is currently an unrestricted free agent who most recently played under contract with Linköping HC in the Swedish Hockey League (SHL).

== Playing career ==
Schira played for the Regina Pats and the Vancouver Giants of the Western Hockey League as a junior. On March 9, 2009, Schira signed a three-year entry-level contract with the Ottawa Senators of the National Hockey League. He was assigned to the Binghamton Senators for the 2009–10 season where he completed his first professional season.

In the 2013–14 he continued his European career by signing a two-year deal with Finnish Liiga team HPK.

Entering his fourth year with Rögle BK of the SHL in the 2020–21 season, Schira having declined in his offensive output with the club, was loaned on a short-term basis to fellow SHL competitors HV71 on December 11, 2020. Schira made 4 appearances and collected 2 goals before ending his loan with HV71. On December 31, 2020, Schira left Rögle BK by moving to Germany to sign for the remainder of the season with Adler Mannheim of the Deutsche Eishockey Liga (DEL).

Schira spent two years in a return to Sweden with Linköping HC of the SHL, before leaving at the conclusion of his contract following the 2022–23 season on March 15, 2023.

== Career statistics ==
=== Regular season and playoffs ===
			Regular season					Playoffs
Season	Team	League	GP	G	A	Pts	PIM	GP	G	A	Pts	PIM
2003–04	Saskatoon Blazers	SMHL	50	4	17	21	14	—	—	—	—	—
2003–04	Regina Pats	WHL	2	0	0	0	2	—	—	—	—	—
2004–05	Regina Pats	WHL	60	1	7	8	25	—	—	—	—	—
2005–06	Regina Pats	WHL	71	5	28	33	72	6	1	1	2	2
2006–07	Regina Pats	WHL	71	3	23	26	74	10	0	0	0	4
2007–08	Regina Pats	WHL	2	0	1	1	0	—	—	—	—	—
2007–08	Vancouver Giants	WHL	63	8	22	30	58	10	0	1	1	0
2008–09	Vancouver Giants	WHL	71	16	43	59	46	17	2	4	6	4
2009–10	Binghamton Senators	AHL	68	8	13	21	27	—	—	—	—	—
2010–11	Binghamton Senators	AHL	67	3	10	13	18	7	0	1	1	0
2011–12	Binghamton Senators	AHL	73	4	9	13	27	—	—	—	—	—
2012–13	Frisk Asker	GET	45	17	18	35	51	5	0	4	4	4
2013–14	HPK	Liiga	54	9	16	25	16	—	—	—	—	—
2014–15	HPK	Liiga	55	5	23	28	48	—	—	—	—	—
2015–16	Luleå HF	SHL	51	4	12	16	16	11	0	7	7	2
2016–17	Luleå HF	SHL	42	6	9	15	43	2	1	0	1	0
2017–18	Rögle BK	SHL	52	4	24	28	28	—	—	—	—	—
2018–19	Rögle BK	SHL	41	2	12	14	12	2	0	0	0	0
2019–20	Rögle BK	SHL	31	2	3	5	6	—	—	—	—	—
2020–21	Rögle BK	SHL	6	0	0	0	0	—	—	—	—	—
2020–21	HV71	SHL	4	2	0	2	0	—	—	—	—	—
2020–21	Adler Mannheim	DEL	25	2	1	3	12	6	0	1	1	0
2021–22	Linköping HC	SHL	40	1	3	4	16	—	—	—	—	—
2022–23	Linköping HC	SHL	36	1	3	4	8	—	—	—	—	—
AHL totals			208	15	32	47	72	7	0	1	1	0
SHL totals			303	22	66	88	129	15	1	7	8	2

=== International ===
Year	Team	Event	Result	GP	G	A	Pts	PIM
2005	Canada Western	U17	1st place, gold medalist(s)	6	0	2	2	2
2006	Canada	WJC18	4th	7	0	2	2	8
Junior totals				13	0	4	4	10
