= Mark Borowiecki =

Canadian ice hockey player

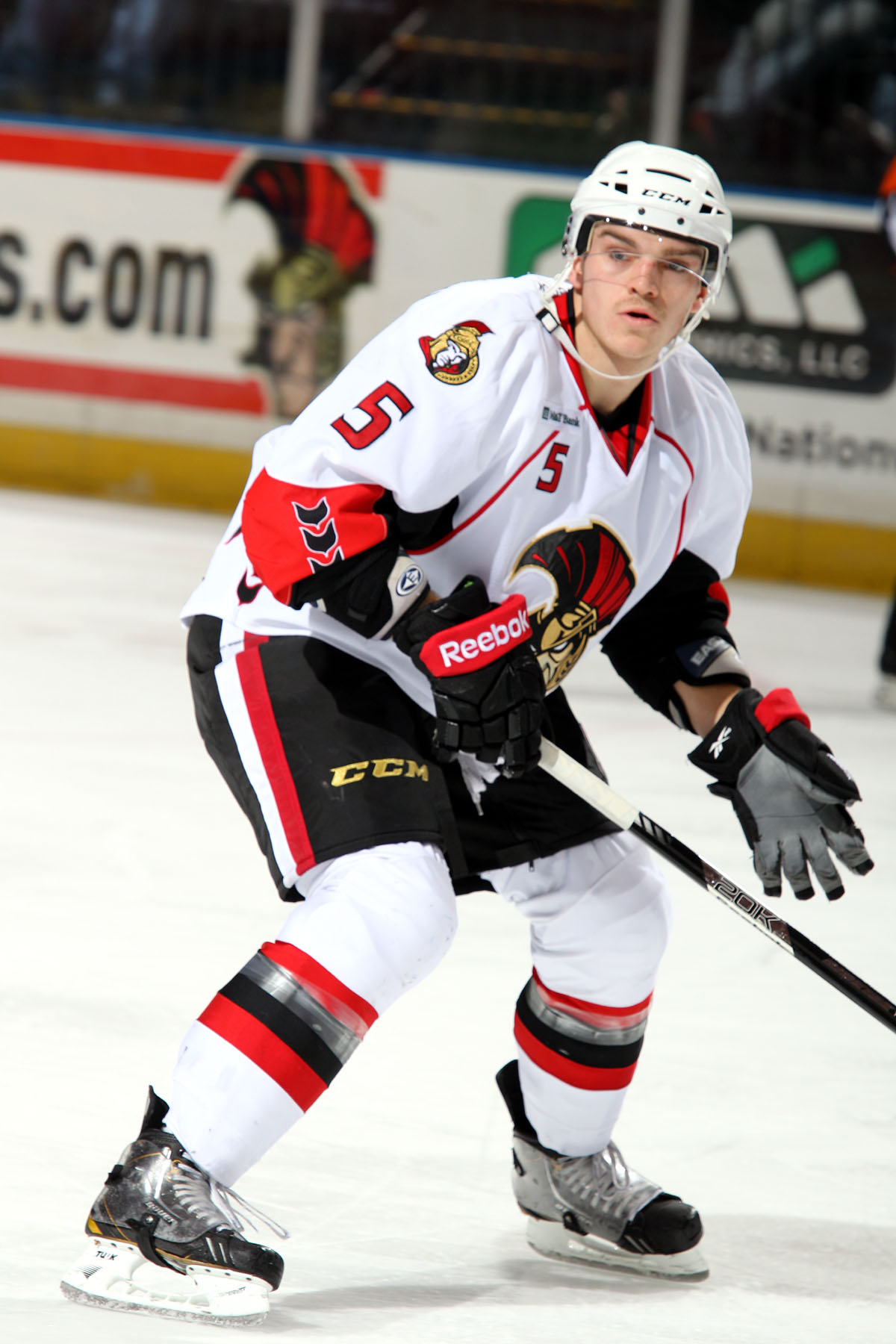
- Borowiecki with the Binghamton Senators in 2012
- Born: July 12, 1989 (age 37) Ottawa, Ontario, Canada
- Height: 6 ft 1 in (185 cm)
- Weight: 216 lb (98 kg; 15 st 6 lb)
- Position: Defence
- Shot: Left
- Played for: Ottawa Senators; Nashville Predators
- NHL draft: 139th overall, 2008; Ottawa Senators
- Playing career: 2011–2023

Mark Borowiecki (pronounced BOR-vee-ETZ-kee; born July 12, 1989) is a Canadian former professional ice hockey defenceman. He ended his career with the Nashville Predators of the National Hockey League (NHL). He was the first Ottawa native to be drafted by the Ottawa Senators when he was selected 139th overall in the 2008 NHL entry draft. Fans have nicknamed him "Boro Cop".

== Playing career ==
=== Amateur ===
Borowiecki played two seasons of junior hockey with the Smiths Falls Bears of the Central Junior Hockey League (CJHL) from 2006 until 2008. Borowiecki then chose to go to Clarkson University. Borowiecki was selected by the Ottawa Senators in the fifth round (139th overall) of the 2008 NHL entry draft. Borowiecki played three seasons with the Golden Knights team in the Eastern Collegiate Athletic Conference, scoring 12 goals and 20 assists. He served as team captain for the 2010–11 season.

=== Professional ===
==== Ottawa Senators ====
On March 11, 2011, the Ottawa Senators signed Borowiecki to a two-year entry-level contract. He joined the Senators' American Hockey League affiliate, the Binghamton Senators for the remainder of the 2010-11 season. After playing nine regular season games, Borowiecki contributed two assists and eight penalty minutes in twenty-one playoff games as the Senators won the 2011 Calder Cup.

On January 17, 2012, Borowiecki was called up by the Senators and joined the team on a western road trip. On January 19, Borowiecki made his NHL debut in a 4-1 Ottawa victory over the San Jose Sharks. He joined Chris Phillips on the third pairing. Borowiecki was returned to Binghamton one week later.

Following the resolution of the 2012–13 NHL lock-out Borowiecki began the season in Ottawa, replacing the injured Jared Cowen in the Ottawa line-up. His strong physical presence kept him in the line-up. GM Bryan Murray stated that the defenceman's willingness to compete is "out of sight". Borowiecki was returned to Binghamton after six games with Ottawa.

Borowiecki scored his first NHL goal on November 7, 2013 against Carey Price of the Montreal Canadiens. On August 18, 2014, Borowiecki and the Senators agreed to terms on a three-year contract extension worth about $3.3 million.

On October 5, 2017, the Senators re-signed Borowiecki to a two-year, $2.4 million contract extension.

On October 23, 2018, Borowiecki elbowed Boston Bruins' defenceman Urho Vaakanainen during a scrum in the Senators' crease. He was not penalized on the play, but received a one-game suspension for the incident. In his first game back on October 28 against the Vegas Golden Knights, Borowiecki delivered an illegal hit to the head of Cody Eakin. Borowiecki was issued a five-minute major penalty on the play, and given a three-game suspension.

==== Nashville Predators ====
On October 9, 2020, Borowiecki signed as a free agent a two-year, $4 million contract with the Nashville Predators. In his first season with Nashville, Borowiecki suffered a concussion in a game against the Carolina Hurricanes and missed time. On June 1, Borowiecki released a statement on his Instagram account about dealing with problems with his mental health and concussions. On February 15, 2022, Borowiecki signed a one-year extension with the Predators. On April 11, 2022, Evgeni Malkin of the Pittsburgh Penguins was suspended for four games after delivering an illegal cross-check to Borowiecki's face. On October 22, 2022, Borowiecki was seriously hurt in an awkward collision along the boards with Morgan Frost in a game versus the Philadelphia Flyers. Borowiecki left the ice on a stretcher after briefly falling unconscious. He was taken to the hospital but discharged later that night. He was placed on injured reserve on October 31, 2022 and Jordan Gross was recalled to take his place on the roster. Borowiecki would remain out for the rest of the season, and on May 3, 2023, he announced his retirement.

== Personal life ==
Borowiecki married his wife Tara in 2015. Their son was born in 2020.

In a December 2019 off-ice incident in Vancouver, British Columbia, Borowiecki prevented a theft, and attempted a citizen's arrest, earning him the nickname 'Boro Cop.' Borowiecki was shopping for baby clothes and witnessed a man breaking into a car, stealing a backpack. Borowiecki stopped the suspect, retrieving the pack, but the suspect fled.

== Career statistics ==
Bold indicates led league

			Regular season					Playoffs
Season	Team	League	GP	G	A	Pts	PIM	GP	G	A	Pts	PIM
2006–07	Smiths Falls Bears	CJHL	53	3	25	28	85	6	0	0	0	10
2007–08	Smiths Falls Bears	CJHL	46	2	24	26	80	15	1	10	11	22
2008–09	Clarkson University	ECAC	33	1	1	2	24	—	—	—	—	—
2009–10	Clarkson University	ECAC	35	8	11	19	59	—	—	—	—	—
2010–11	Clarkson University	ECAC	31	3	8	11	67	—	—	—	—	—
2010–11	Binghamton Senators	AHL	9	0	0	0	6	21	0	2	2	8
2011–12	Binghamton Senators	AHL	73	5	17	22	127	—	—	—	—	—
2011–12	Ottawa Senators	NHL	2	0	0	0	2	—	—	—	—	—
2012–13	Binghamton Senators	AHL	53	4	10	14	157	3	1	0	1	4
2012–13	Ottawa Senators	NHL	6	0	0	0	18	—	—	—	—	—
2013–14	Binghamton Senators	AHL	50	2	6	8	158	4	0	0	0	4
2013–14	Ottawa Senators	NHL	13	1	0	1	48	—	—	—	—	—
2014–15	Ottawa Senators	NHL	63	1	10	11	107	6	0	0	0	6
2015–16	Ottawa Senators	NHL	63	1	1	2	107	—	—	—	—	—
2016–17	Ottawa Senators	NHL	70	1	2	3	**154**	2	0	0	0	2
2017–18	Ottawa Senators	NHL	52	3	8	11	64	—	—	—	—	—
2018–19	Ottawa Senators	NHL	53	1	4	5	89	—	—	—	—	—
2019–20	Ottawa Senators	NHL	53	7	11	18	58	—	—	—	—	—
2020–21	Nashville Predators	NHL	22	0	1	1	38	—	—	—	—	—
2021–22	Nashville Predators	NHL	57	0	4	4	**151**	2	0	0	0	0
2022–23	Nashville Predators	NHL	4	0	0	0	12	—	—	—	—	—
NHL totals			458	15	41	56	848	10	0	0	0	8
