= André Benoit =

Canadian ice hockey player (born 1984)

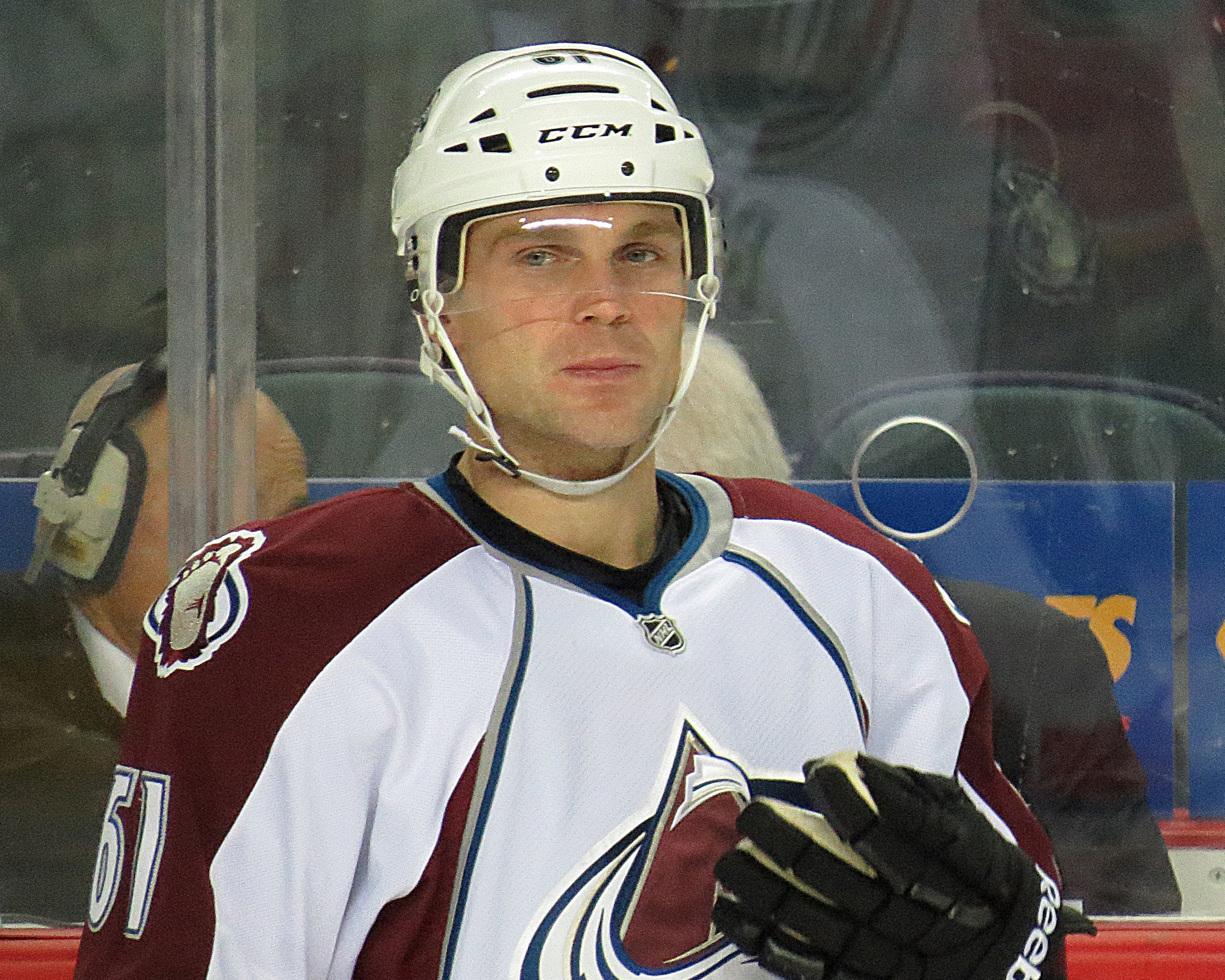
- Born: January 6, 1984 (age 42) St. Albert, Ontario, Canada
- Height: 5 ft 11 in (180 cm)
- Weight: 197 lb (89 kg; 14 st 1 lb)
- Position: Defence
- Shot: Left
- Played for: Tappara; Södertälje SK; Ottawa Senators; Spartak Moscow; Colorado Avalanche; Buffalo Sabres; St. Louis Blues; Malmö Redhawks
- NHL draft: Undrafted
- Playing career: 2005–2018

André Benoit (born January 6, 1984) is a Canadian former professional ice hockey defenseman. He played for several professional teams including the Ottawa Senators, Colorado Avalanche, Buffalo Sabres and the St. Louis Blues of the National Hockey League (NHL), Södertälje SK, Tappara and Malmö Redhawks in Europe, as well as Spartak Moscow of the KHL.

== Playing career ==
As a youth, Benoit played in the 1998 Quebec International Pee-Wee Hockey Tournament with the Ottawa Senators minor ice hockey team.

Benoit played five years of junior hockey with the Kitchener Rangers of the Ontario Hockey League (OHL). He was not drafted by any NHL team but was signed by the Hamilton Bulldogs of the American Hockey League (AHL) in the summer of 2005. Benoit began his professional career in the 2005–06 season with the Bulldogs and was signed in 2006 a three-year entry-level contract with the Montreal Canadiens, the NHL parent team of the Bulldogs. He spent the rest of that season and the entirety of the next season with Hamilton, helping the Bulldogs capture the Calder Cup.

After his three-year deal expired in 2007, Benoit continued his career in Europe, playing one season with Tappara Tampere of the SM-liiga in 2007–08, followed by one season with Södertälje SK of the Swedish Elite League.

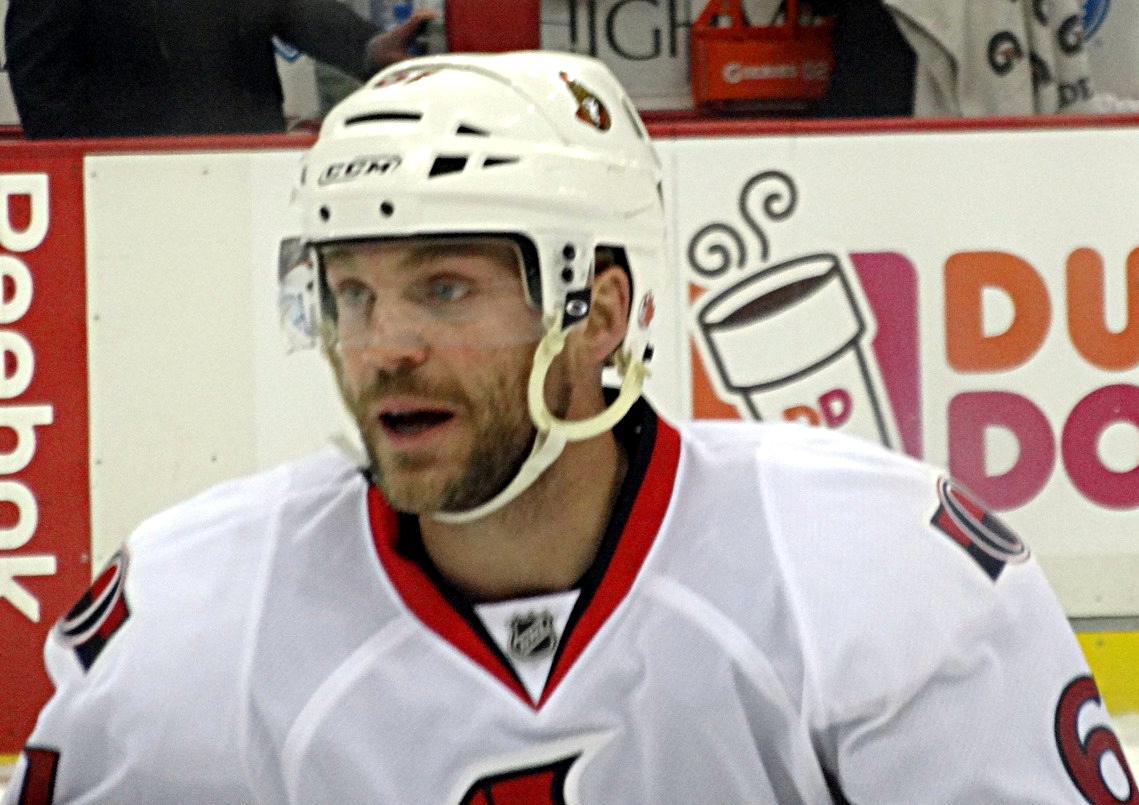
Benoit with the Senators during the 2013 playoffs.

Benoit returned to North America in 2009, signing a one-year contract with the Canadiens in May 2009 and playing most of the 2009–10 season with their AHL farm club in Hamilton.

In the 2010 off-season, Benoit left the Canadiens organization and signed a one-year, two-way contract with the Ottawa Senators. He failed to make the NHL team out of training camp and was assigned to its AHL affiliate in Binghamton. He was called up to Ottawa in February 2011 and played in eight regular season games. He was returned to Binghamton for the post-season, helping Binghamton win the 2011 Calder Cup and for a third time in his career led all AHL defenseman in assists in the playoffs.

In the 2011 off-season Benoit returned to Europe, signing a one-year contract with Spartak Moscow of the Kontinental Hockey League.

On July 1, 2012, during the NHL's first day of free agency, Benoit rejoined the Ottawa Senators organization, signing a one-year two-way deal. Benoit captained Binghamton during the NHL lockout and started the shortened 2012–13 season with Ottawa once the lockout concluded in January 2013. He scored his first NHL goal on February 19, 2013, against goaltender Rick DiPietro as Ottawa defeated the New York Islanders 3–1. For the first time in his career, Benoit remained in the NHL for the duration of the year with the resurgent Senators, to post 3 goals and 10 points in 33 games.

With the intention to gain a one-way contract in the NHL, Benoit succeeded in signing as a free agent to a one-year deal with the Colorado Avalanche on July 5, 2013. Benoit made the 2013–14 opening night roster out of training camp, and on his Avalanche debut he logged a game-high in ice time in a 6–1 rout of the Anaheim Ducks on October 2, 2013. Solidifying a blueline position with the Avalanche as a puck moving defenseman, Benoit scored his first goal for the Avalanche and became the first Blueliner in three years to record three points (a career high) in a 4–3 overtime win against the Phoenix Coyotes on November 21, 2013. Benoit later appeared in his 100th career NHL game against the Coyotes on February 28, 2014. In helping the surprising Avalanche capture the Central Division title, Benoit completed his first full NHL season, finishing third amongst Avalanche defenseman with 7 goals and 21 assists for 28 points in 79 games.

On July 23, 2014, Benoit signed as a free agent to a one-year, $800,000 contract with the Buffalo Sabres. In the 2014–15 campaign, his second full NHL season, Benoit played 59 games among the cellar-dwelling Sabres, unable to match his previous season's success, contributing with 1 goal and 9 points from the blueline.

On July 6, 2015, having left the Sabres as a free agent, Benoit signed a one-year, two-way contract with the St. Louis Blues. After three full seasons of playing in the NHL, Benoit was demoted to the AHL for the first time since 2012, having been reassigned to affiliate the Chicago Wolves to begin the 2015–16 season.

After managing just 2 further games in the NHL with the Blues, at the completion of his contract, Benoit opted to return to Europe, signing a one-year deal with Swedish club, the Malmö Redhawks of the SHL on July 22, 2016. In his first return to the SHL since 2009, Benoit assumed a top four pairing role for the 2016–17 season with the Redhawks. Appearing in 52 games, Benoit registered 24 points and helped the club reach the semi-finals in the post-season. On April 12, 2017, it was announced that Benoit would not be continuing with Malmö.

As a free agent, Benoit opted to return again to North America, securing a one-year, two-way NHL contract with the Columbus Blue Jackets on July 1, 2017. He was assigned to play the 2017–18 season with AHL affiliate, the Cleveland Monsters. In adding a veteran presence, Benoit appeared in 31 games for just 5 points before he was loaned to fellow AHL club, the Bridgeport Sound Tigers to play out the remainder of his career on February 13, 2018.

== Personal ==
A fire destroyed the St. Albert Cheese Factory in Benoit's hometown of St. Albert, Ontario, in February 2013, leaving 125 people – roughly one fifth of the town's population – out of work for the foreseeable future. Benoit, who worked at the factory as a teenager, responded by donating a pair of tickets to the Senators' Hockey Day in Canada game against the Winnipeg Jets to each employee affected by the fire.

Following his retirement, Benoit founded and runs an online hockey school.

== Career statistics ==
=== Regular season and playoffs ===
| | | | Regular season | | | | | Playoffs |
| Season | Team | League | GP | G | A | Pts | PIM | GP | G | A | Pts | PIM |
|---|---|---|---|---|---|---|---|---|---|---|---|---|
| 2000–01 | Kitchener Rangers | OHL | 65 | 16 | 19 | 35 | 37 | — | — | — | — | — |
| 2001–02 | Kitchener Rangers | OHL | 62 | 13 | 32 | 45 | 77 | 4 | 1 | 0 | 1 | 8 |
| 2002–03 | Kitchener Rangers | OHL | 65 | 22 | 45 | 67 | 77 | 21 | 1 | 16 | 17 | 16 |
| 2003–04 | Kitchener Rangers | OHL | 65 | 24 | 51 | 75 | 67 | 5 | 1 | 1 | 2 | 6 |
| 2004–05 | Kitchener Rangers | OHL | 67 | 24 | 53 | 77 | 72 | 15 | 5 | 13 | 18 | 6 |
| 2005–06 | Hamilton Bulldogs | AHL | 70 | 7 | 19 | 26 | 60 | — | — | — | — | — |
| 2006–07 | Hamilton Bulldogs | AHL | 64 | 10 | 21 | 31 | 41 | 22 | 2 | 11 | 13 | 22 |
| 2007–08 | Tappara | SM-l | 54 | 12 | 26 | 38 | 96 | 11 | 2 | 3 | 5 | 10 |
| 2008–09 | Södertälje SK | SEL | 54 | 4 | 16 | 20 | 34 | — | — | — | — | — |
| 2009–10 | Hamilton Bulldogs | AHL | 78 | 6 | 30 | 36 | 63 | 19 | 3 | 11 | 14 | 8 |
| 2010–11 | Binghamton Senators | AHL | 73 | 11 | 44 | 55 | 53 | 23 | 3 | 15 | 18 | 14 |
| 2010–11 | Ottawa Senators | NHL | 8 | 0 | 1 | 1 | 6 | — | — | — | — | — |
| 2011–12 | Spartak Moscow | KHL | 53 | 5 | 11 | 16 | 34 | — | — | — | — | — |
| 2012–13 | Binghamton Senators | AHL | 34 | 9 | 16 | 25 | 28 | — | — | — | — | — |
| 2012–13 | Ottawa Senators | NHL | 33 | 3 | 7 | 10 | 8 | 5 | 0 | 3 | 3 | 0 |
| 2013–14 | Colorado Avalanche | NHL | 79 | 7 | 21 | 28 | 26 | 7 | 0 | 1 | 1 | 6 |
| 2014–15 | Buffalo Sabres | NHL | 59 | 1 | 8 | 9 | 20 | — | — | — | — | — |
| 2015–16 | Chicago Wolves | AHL | 72 | 8 | 25 | 33 | 26 | — | — | — | — | — |
| 2015–16 | St. Louis Blues | NHL | 2 | 0 | 0 | 0 | 0 | — | — | — | — | — |
| 2016–17 | Malmö Redhawks | SHL | 52 | 6 | 18 | 24 | 22 | 13 | 0 | 2 | 2 | 8 |
| 2017–18 | Cleveland Monsters | AHL | 31 | 1 | 4 | 5 | 22 | — | — | — | — | — |
| 2017–18 | Bridgeport Sound Tigers | AHL | 19 | 1 | 8 | 9 | 10 | — | — | — | — | — |
| NHL totals | | | 181 | 11 | 37 | 48 | 60 | 12 | 0 | 4 | 4 | 6 |

=== International ===
| Year | Team | Event | Result | GP | G | A | Pts | PIM |
|---|---|---|---|---|---|---|---|---|
| 2002 | Canada | WJC18 | 6th | 8 | 1 | 3 | 4 | 4 |
| Junior totals | | | | 8 | 1 | 3 | 4 | 4 |

== Awards and honours ==
| Award | Year |
|---|---|
OHL
| Memorial Cup | 2003 |
| William Hanley Trophy | 2004 |
| Second All-Star Team | 2004 |
| Leo Lalonde Memorial Trophy | 2005 |
| First All-Star Team | 2005 |
AHL
| Calder Cup | 2007, 2011 |
| AHL Second All-Star Team | 2011 |
International
| Spengler Cup Champion | 2007 |
