= Ryan Keller =

Canadian ice hockey player (born 1984)

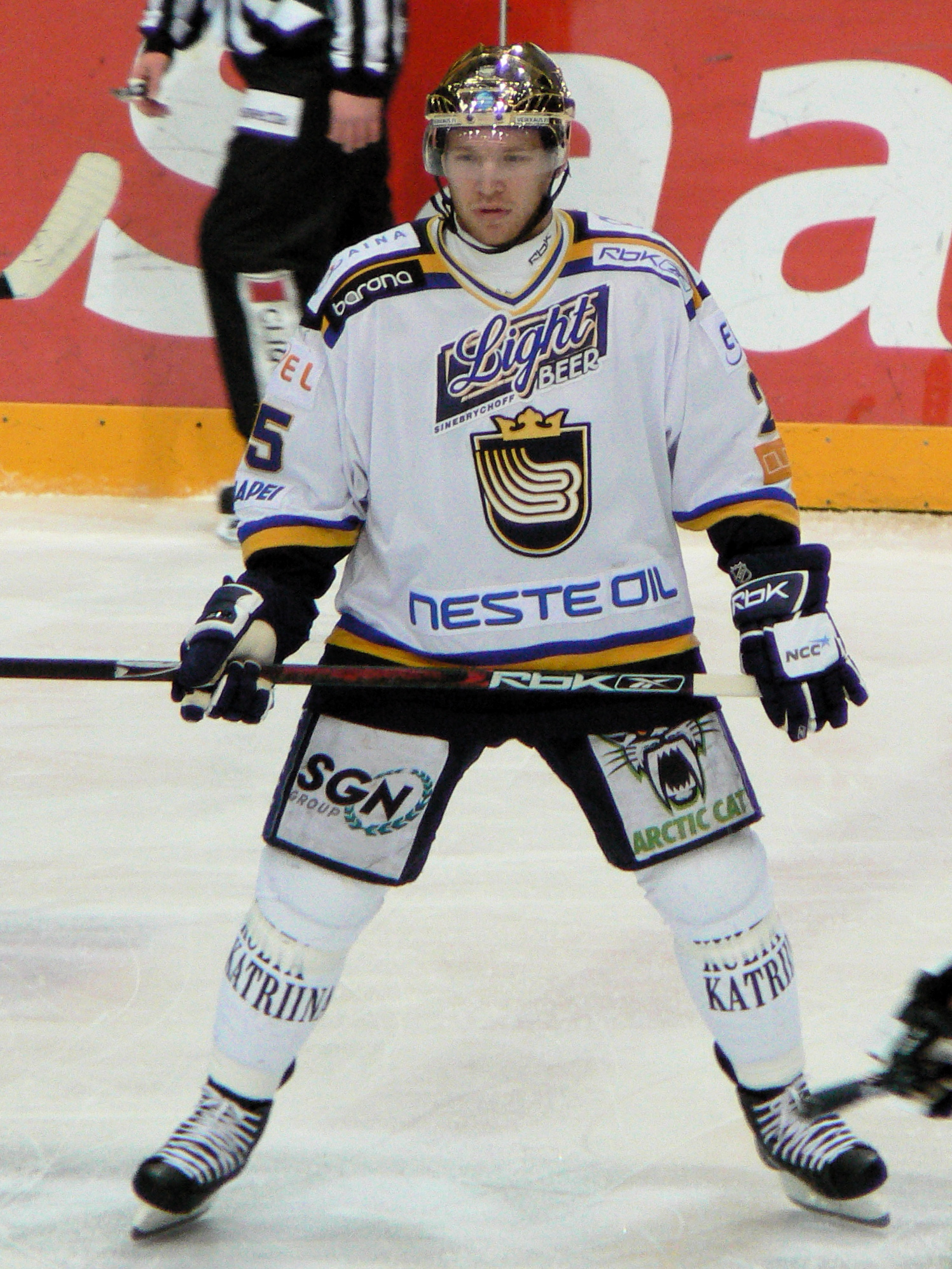
- Keller playing for Espoo Blues in Finland, in February 2008
- Born: January 6, 1984 (age 42) Saskatoon, Saskatchewan, Canada
- Height: 5 ft 10 in (178 cm)
- Weight: 196 lb (89 kg; 14 st 0 lb)
- Position: Right wing
- Shot: Right
- Played for: Espoo Blues; Ottawa Senators; Genève-Servette HC; ZSC Lions
- NHL draft: Undrafted
- Playing career: 2005–2016

Ryan Keller (born January 6, 1984) is a Canadian former professional ice hockey player. He played in Switzerland, Finland, and various North American minor league teams, and the Ottawa Senators of the National Hockey League.

== Playing career ==
Keller spent four seasons playing junior hockey in the Western Hockey League for the Saskatoon Blades. Since turning pro in 2005, Keller has had spells in the American Hockey League for the Grand Rapids Griffins and the Syracuse Crunch and also in the United Hockey League for the Muskegon Fury. In 2005, Keller played pre-season games for Sparta Warriors in Norway, before leaving to train with the NHL Detroit Red Wings. In 2007, he moved to Finland, signing for Espoo Blues. He played on the team for two seasons, leading the team in scoring in both seasons.

Keller returned to North America in 2009 to sign with the Ottawa Senators. Keller was assigned to the Binghamton Senators to start the 2009–10 season. Keller was recalled to Ottawa on November 24, and he played his first NHL game on November 25, 2009 against the New Jersey Devils. After leading Binghamton with 34 goals Keller was re-signed with a one-year contract by Ottawa on May 19, 2010. Keller was named captain of the Senators who would go on to win the Calder Cup in 2011.

After playing for the Binghamton Senators of the AHL in 2010–11, as a free agent, on July 4, 2011, Keller signed a one-year, two-way contract with the Edmonton Oilers.

He headed to Switzerland in 2012, joining Genève-Servette HC of the National League A (NLA) for the 2012-13 campaign. In 2013, he moved on to fellow NLA side ZSC Lions. He won the 2014 Swiss championship and the 2016 Swiss Cup with the Lions. Keller announced his retirement from professional ice hockey on July 13, 2016.

He is a cousin of WHL player Riley Heidt and is expected first-round NHL draft pick in 2023.

== Career statistics ==
=== Regular season and playoffs ===
			Regular season					Playoffs
Season	Team	League	GP	G	A	Pts	PIM	GP	G	A	Pts	PIM
2001–02	Saskatoon Blades	WHL	52	18	23	41	58	7	1	2	3	14
2002–03	Saskatoon Blades	WHL	66	38	41	79	101	6	7	1	8	8
2003–04	Saskatoon Blades	WHL	72	24	20	44	59	—	—	—	—	—
2004–05	Saskatoon Blades	WHL	67	40	33	73	63	4	1	1	2	9
2005–06	Grand Rapids Griffins	AHL	10	1	0	1	14	13	0	0	0	0
2005–06	Muskegon Fury	UHL	65	41	40	81	79	3	2	2	4	0
2006–07	Grand Rapids Griffins	AHL	38	9	8	17	26	—	—	—	—	—
2006–07	Syracuse Crunch	AHL	22	5	9	14	14	—	—	—	—	—
2007–08	Espoo Blues	SM-l	47	22	22	44	24	17	3	6	9	22
2008–09	Espoo Blues	SM-l	54	21	34	55	38	14	9	7	16	4
2009–10	Binghamton Senators	AHL	72	34	34	68	48	—	—	—	—	—
2009–10	Ottawa Senators	NHL	6	0	0	0	0	—	—	—	—	—
2010–11	Binghamton Senators	AHL	71	32	19	51	38	23	10	15	25	8
2011–12	Oklahoma City Barons	AHL	71	21	28	49	38	14	5	5	10	14
2012–13	Genève-Servette HC	NLA	46	12	13	25	4	6	0	3	3	2
2013–14	ZSC Lions	NLA	37	11	10	21	18	18	11	3	14	8
2014–15	ZSC Lions	NLA	39	9	9	18	28	18	5	5	10	10
2015–16	ZSC Lions	NLA	47	18	12	30	22	2	0	0	0	0
2016–17	Rosetown Red Wings	ChHL	2	4	2	6	2	—	—	—	—	—
2017–18	Rosetown Red Wings	ACHW	4	3	4	7	0	—	—	—	—	—
AHL totals			284	102	98	200	178	50	15	20	35	22
NHL totals			6	0	0	0	0	—	—	—	—	—

=== International ===
Year	Team	Event	GP	G	A	Pts	PIM
2002	Canada	U18	8	2	0	2	14
Junior totals			8	2	0	2	14

=== International ===
Year	Team	Event	Result	GP	G	A	Pts	PIM
2002	Canada	WJC18	6th	8	2	0	2	14
Junior totals				8	2	0	2	14

== Awards and honours ==
Award	Year
WHL
East Second All-Star Team	2005
AHL
Calder Cup (Binghamton Senators)	2011
All-Star Game	2012
