= Derek Smith (ice hockey, born 1984) =

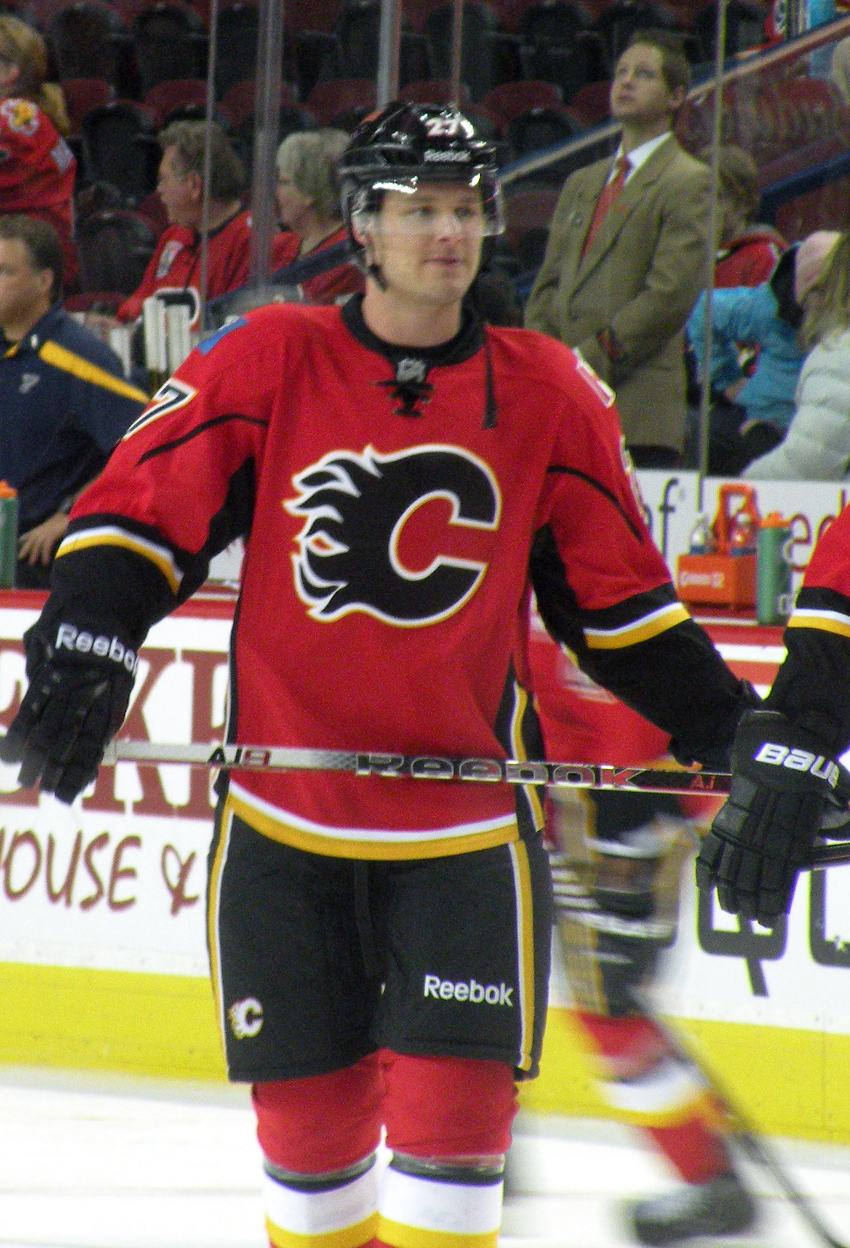
- Born: October 13, 1984 (age 41) Belleville, Ontario, Canada
- Height: 6 ft 2 in (188 cm)
- Weight: 200 lb (91 kg; 14 st 4 lb)
- Position: Defence
- Shot: Left
- Played for: Ottawa Senators; Calgary Flames; ZSC Lions; KHL Medveščak Zagreb
- NHL draft: Undrafted
- Playing career: 2007–2017

Derek A. Smith (born October 13, 1984) is a Canadian-American former professional ice hockey player. Smith formerly played with the Ottawa Senators and Calgary Flames in the National Hockey League (NHL). He is currently the Head Coach of the Cobourg Cougars of the OJHL.

== Playing career ==
After playing 123 games over four seasons between 2000 and 2004 for the Wellington Dukes of the Ontario Provincial Junior Hockey League, Smith played three more seasons for the Lake Superior State Lakers. Undrafted, he signed as a free agent with the Ottawa Senators of the National Hockey League (NHL) on April 12, 2007, and decided to leave college a year early to pursue his dreams of playing in the NHL. After training camp, Smith was assigned to the Senators' top minor league affiliate, the Binghamton Senators. Smith was re-signed by the Senators to a one-year contract on July 29, 2009.

On February 12, 2010, after the trade of Alex Picard and an injury to Chris Campoli, Smith was called up to the Ottawa Senators. He made his NHL debut against the Detroit Red Wings on February 13, 2010, in a 4–1 loss. He stayed on for the next game on February 14 against the New York Islanders. That was the final game before the Olympic break, which Ottawa won 4–3 after coming back from a 3–1 deficit. He was returned to Binghamton afterward.

On July 13, 2010, Smith was re-signed by Ottawa to a one-year, two-way contract. He recorded his first NHL point when he assisted on a goal by Ottawa's Nick Foligno against the Atlanta Thrashers on March 3, 2011. In 2010-11, Smith was a member of the Binghamton Senators as they captured the 2011 Calder Cup championship in the American Hockey League. In 71 regular season games that season with Binghamton, he recorded 10 goals and 44 assists for 54 points which placed him 4th among AHL defenceman.

Smith was signed by the Calgary Flames to a one-year, two-way contract worth $700,000 on July 12, 2011. Smith scored his first goal for the Flames on November 29, 2011, against Pekka Rinne of the Nashville Predators. On February 8, 2012, the Calgary Flames re-signed Smith to a two-year, one-way contract worth a total of $1.55 million, or $775,000 per year.

On December 8, 2013, the Flames placed Smith on waivers. After he cleared waivers the next day, the Flames assigned Smith to the Abbotsford Heat of the AHL.

In the following 2014–15 season, without an NHL offer on the table, Smith signed his first contract abroad as a free agent, agreeing to a one-year deal with Swiss club, ZSC Lions of the National League A. He appeared in 25 games with the Lions, registering 3 goals and 5 points.

On July 3, 2015, Smith returned to the NHL, signing a one-year, two-way contract with the Arizona Coyotes. Smith failed to make the roster of the parent club and was assigned to its AHL affiliate, the Springfield Falcons, for the remainder of the season.

On July 17, 2016, Smith signed a one-year deal with Croatian club, KHL Medveščak Zagreb of the KHL.

== Career statistics ==
=== Regular season and playoffs ===
			Regular season					Playoffs
Season	Team	League	GP	G	A	Pts	PIM	GP	G	A	Pts	PIM
2000–01	Wellington Dukes	OPJHL	12	1	1	2	4	—	—	—	—	—
2001–02	Wellington Dukes	OPJHL	46	5	15	20	26	—	—	—	—	—
2002–03	Wellington Dukes	OPJHL	21	6	10	16	26	—	—	—	—	—
2003–04	Wellington Dukes	OPJHL	44	8	26	34	34	—	—	—	—	—
2004–05	Lake Superior State U.	CCHA	38	1	4	5	28	—	—	—	—	—
2005–06	Lake Superior State U.	CCHA	36	2	8	10	18	—	—	—	—	—
2006–07	Lake Superior State U.	CCHA	43	10	20	30	10	—	—	—	—	—
2007–08	Binghamton Senators	AHL	52	2	11	13	18	—	—	—	—	—
2007–08	Elmira Jackals	ECHL	1	0	1	1	0	—	—	—	—	—
2008–09	Binghamton Senators	AHL	75	7	17	24	49	—	—	—	—	—
2009–10	Binghamton Senators	AHL	74	14	37	51	24	—	—	—	—	—
2009–10	Ottawa Senators	NHL	2	0	0	0	0	—	—	—	—	—
2010–11	Binghamton Senators	AHL	71	10	44	54	21	6	1	1	2	6
2010–11	Ottawa Senators	NHL	9	0	1	1	0	—	—	—	—	—
2011–12	Calgary Flames	NHL	47	2	9	11	12	—	—	—	—	—
2012–13	Calgary Flames	NHL	22	0	1	1	10	—	—	—	—	—
2013–14	Calgary Flames	NHL	14	0	1	1	2	—	—	—	—	—
2013–14	Abbotsford Heat	AHL	32	7	17	24	22	1	0	0	0	0
2014–15	ZSC Lions	NLA	25	3	2	5	4	5	0	1	1	6
2015–16	Springfield Falcons	AHL	28	2	17	19	10	—	—	—	—	—
2016–17	KHL Medveščak Zagreb	KHL	44	2	7	9	42	—	—	—	—	—
NHL totals			94	2	12	14	24	—	—	—	—	—

=== International ===
Year	Team	Event	Result	GP	G	A	Pts	PIM
2001	United States	WJC18	6th	6	0	0	0	4
Junior totals				6	0	0	0	4

== Awards and honors ==
Award	Year
College
All-CCHA Second Team	2007
