= Binghamton Senators =

Former American ice hockey team

- City: Binghamton, New York
- League: American Hockey League
- Founded: 1972
- Operated: 2002–2017
- Home arena: Floyd L. Maines Veterans Memorial Arena
- Colors: Red, black, antique gold, white
- Affiliates: Ottawa Senators (NHL)

Franchise history
- 1972–1992: New Haven Nighthawks
- 1992–1993: New Haven Senators
- 1993–1996: Prince Edward Island Senators
- 2002–2017: Binghamton Senators
- 2017–present: Belleville Senators

Championships
- Division titles: 3 (2002–03, 2004–05, 2013–14)
- Conference titles: 1 (2010–11)
- Calder Cups: 1 (2010–11)

The Binghamton Senators were a professional ice hockey team in the American Hockey League (AHL) that played from 2002 to 2017. Nicknamed the B-Sens, they played in Binghamton, New York, at the Floyd L. Maines Veterans Memorial Arena. The B-Sens were minor league affiliates of the Ottawa Senators of the National Hockey League. In 2017, the B-Sens' franchise was relocated by the Ottawa Senators to become the Belleville Senators. Binghamton then replaced the franchise with the Binghamton Devils, the AHL franchise of the New Jersey Devils.

They were the AHL's 2010–11 Calder Cup champions. The Senators' main rivals were the nearby teams, the Syracuse Crunch, the Rochester Americans, the Albany Devils, the Wilkes-Barre/Scranton Penguins, and the Hershey Bears.

== History ==
=== Inception and first seasons (2002–2005) ===
The arrival of the B-Sens marked the return of the AHL to the area after a five-year absence. The Rhode Island Reds, a charter member of the AHL, moved to Binghamton in 1977 and played there until 1997, known variously as the Binghamton Dusters (1977–1980), the Binghamton Whalers (1980–1990), and the Binghamton Rangers (1990–1997). While no AHL team played in Binghamton between 1997 and 2002, the market was served by the B.C. Icemen of the United Hockey League.

The Binghamton Senators enjoyed a successful 2002–03 inaugural season, going 43–26–9 with 100 points. They breezed by their first two playoff rounds, but were easily defeated by the Hamilton Bulldogs in five games. By contrast, the 2003–04 season was not as successful as the loss of both Antoine Vermette and Jason Spezza weakened the team. They went 34–34–9 and exited the playoffs in a two-game sweep at the hands of the Norfolk Admirals.

The 2004–05 NHL lockout meant Binghamton got a return visit from their recent graduates and several other NHL players, including Jason Spezza, Antoine Vermette, Anton Volchenkov, Chris Neil, Josh Langfeld, and Brian Pothier, making the Senators a legitimate Calder Cup contender. Jason Spezza led the way with a league high 117 points (earning the AHL MVP). The Senators ended the regular season with only 21 regulation losses, tied for second fewest in the league, taking the division title with a league high 276 goals scored. The Senators entered the playoffs on a roll, winning 11 of their last 13 games, and continued their dominance by cruising through the first two games of their first round best-of-seven series against the Wilkes-Barre/Scranton Penguins, scoring nine goals. But the offense stalled and the Sens scored only five goals in the remaining four games as the Penguins eliminated Binghamton.

=== Later seasons (2009–2017) ===
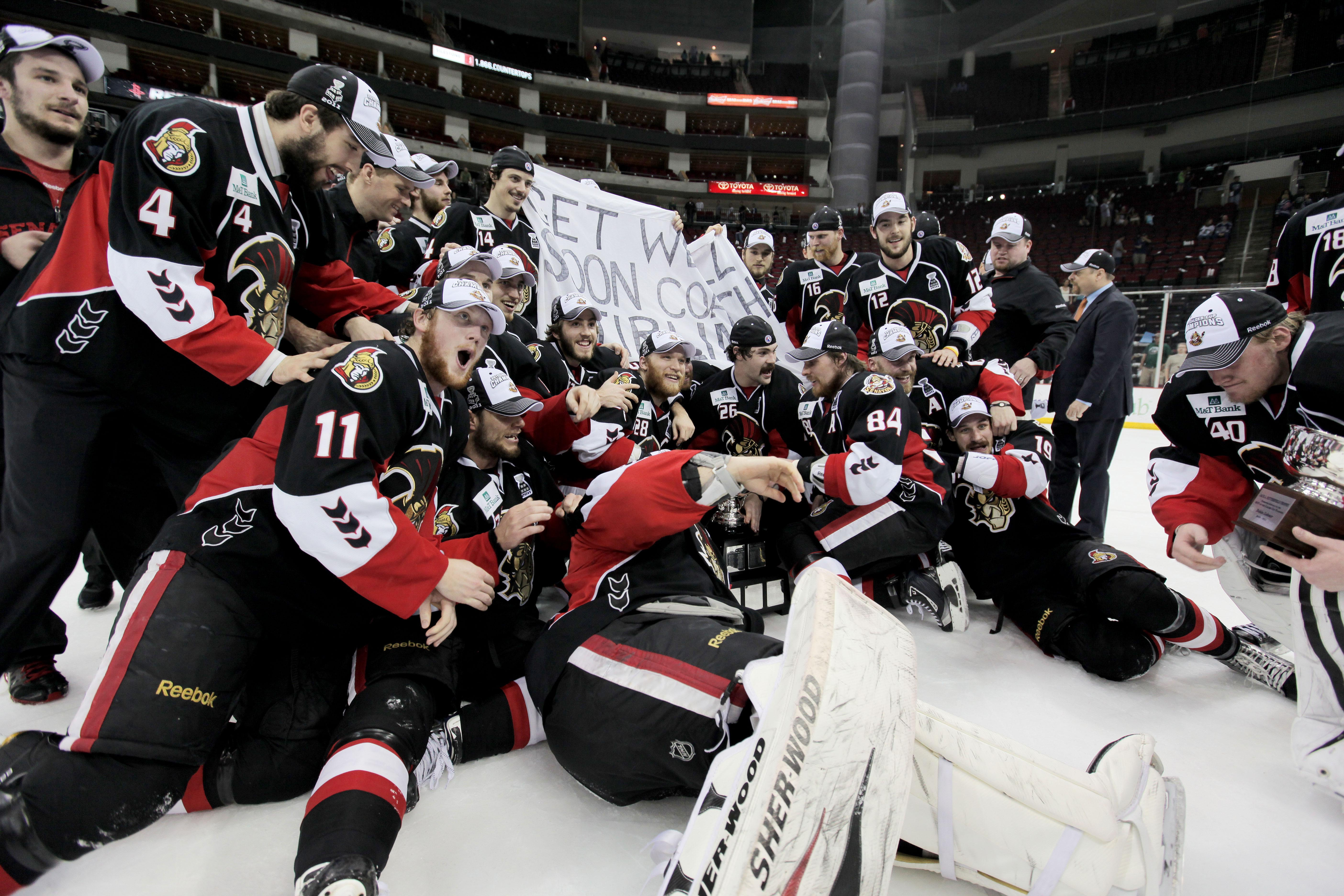
Senators after winning the 2011 Calder Cup

On July 17, 2009, Don Nachbaur was named head coach of the Binghamton Senators. During the 2009–10 AHL season, Nachbaur coached the Senators to a 36–35–6–3 record and 81 points to finish fifth in the AHL's East Division. On June 22, 2010, after only one season behind the bench, Nachbaur announced that he was resigning as head coach citing personal reasons. Kurt Kleinendorst was then appointed the head coach of the B-Sens with a two-year contract. Kleinendorst had spent the previous year leading the USA Hockey National Team Development Program's under-18 team to a gold medal at the 2010 IIHF World U18 Championships in Belarus.

In his first season as head coach, Kleinedorst led the Senators to a fifth-place finish in the East Division. The B-Sens qualified for the 2011 playoffs against the Manchester Monarchs in the first round. They fell behind 3–1 in the series, but won games five and six in overtime to force a game seven. The Senators fell behind 5–4 in game seven, but Erik Condra tied the game with 1:45 remaining in the third period. Ryan Potulny then scored 3:07 into overtime to send the Senators to the second round. Next, the Senators faced the Portland Pirates and won the first two games in Portland to go up 2–0 in the series. They then lost two of the next three games at home to the Pirates and had their series lead cut to 3–2. The Senators shut out the Pirates in game six, 3–0, to go to the Eastern Conference final. In the Eastern Conference final, the Senators faced the Charlotte Checkers. The Senators dominated the series, outscoring the Checkers 21–8, 11–4 at home and 10–4 on the road. In game four, Ryan Keller got the game-winning goal in overtime to send the Senators to the Calder Cup finals.

In the finals, the Senators played the Houston Aeros. The Senators fell behind 2–1 in the series, but a two-game home-ice winning streak gave them the 3–2 lead. The Senators won game six in Houston on June 7, 2011, to capture their first ever Calder Cup, with Ryan Keller scoring the game-winning goal 9:09 into the third period of the deciding game.

In the 2011–12 season, the Senators faced a completely revised lineup as free agents left to join other NHL organizations and several players became full-time Ottawa Senators. The team finished fifth and did not qualify for the playoffs. Head coach Kleinendorst resigned after the season to pursue other opportunities. He was replaced by former NHL player and Ottawa assistant coach Luke Richardson as the team's seventh head coach.

In the 2012–13 offseason, the Senators made several moves in free agency, including bringing back former player Andre Benoit to be the Senators' captain. The NHL lockout also allowed several Ottawa top prospects, such as Jakob Silfverberg and Mika Zibanejad, to start the season in Binghamton. The Senators stormed out to a 27–10–4 start by the all-star break, holding the best record in the AHL at one point. The Senators then lost many players, including Benoit, Silfverburg, Zibanejad and Patrick Wiercioch, to Ottawa as the NHL regular season started. The Senators went 17–14–4 the rest of the way to finish second in the East Division, claim the fourth seed for the playoffs, and finish with a 44–24–8 record overall. However, the Senators offense struggled against the physical play of the Wilkes-Barre/Scranton Penguins and swept the Senators out of the playoffs, three-games-to-none.

The Senators returned almost the entire team from the previous year for the 2013–14 season; the most notable exception being goaltender Robin Lehner, who became Ottawa's regular backup goalie. The Senators contended for the division lead for the entire season. Despite goaltender Nathan Lawson having an injury-filled year, Andrew Hammond filled his spot with 25 wins and a 2.81 GAA. Even with the Senators losing leading scorers Mike Hoffman and Stephane Da Costa along with Mark Stone, Cody Ceci and Jean-Gabriel Pageau, and others to Ottawa during the second half of the year, the Senators clinched their third division title since the 2004–05 season. The division title came on a 5–4 win over the Wilkes-Barre/Scranton Penguins in the second-to-last game of the season to clinch the third seed in the Eastern Conference. For the second year in a row, the Senators played the Penguins in the first round of the playoffs. The first three games of the series were close, all of them going to overtime, but the Senators went down 2–1 in the series. Facing a must-win game four in Wilkes-Barre, the B-Sens were routed by the Penguins 5–1, bowing out in the first round once again.

After the end of the 2015–16 season, head coach Luke Richardson resigned from his position with the organization. Richardson was replaced by the coach he took over for in 2012, Kurt Kleinendorst, on June 8, 2016.

In July 2016, Broome County officials stated that the Ottawa Senators intended to relocate their franchise closer to the parent club in Canada for the 2017–18 season, but that the "AHL has committed to staying in Binghamton and Broome County" due to the B-Sens having three more years left on their lease in 2017. Most reports have conjectured that the relocated Senators franchise would be in Belleville, Ontario, due to plans to renovate Yardmen Arena announced in June 2016. On September 26, Ottawa Senators owner Eugene Melnyk confirmed he had purchased the Binghamton Senators and would relocate the team to become the Belleville Senators for the 2017–18 season. After the Ottawa Senators' announcement of the relocation, the Binghamton organization reconfirmed they were working towards keeping AHL hockey in Binghamton for 2017–18. On January 31, 2017, the Binghamton organization announced it had signed a five-year agreement to operate the New Jersey Devils' AHL affiliate beginning with the 2017–18 season as the Binghamton Devils.

== Season-by-season results ==
Regular Season												Playoffs					
Season	Games	Won	Lost	Tied	OTL	SOL	Points	PCT	Goals for	Goals against	Standing	Year	Prelims	1st round	2nd round	3rd round	Finals
2002–03	80	43	26	9	2	—	97	.606	239	207	1st, East	2003	BYE	W, 3–0, WOR	W, 4–2, BRI	L, 1–4, HAM	—
2003–04	80	34	34	9	3	—	80	.500	210	216	4th, East	2004	L, 0–2, NOR	—	—	—	—
2004–05	80	47	21	—	7	5	106	.663	276	217	1st, East	2005	—	L, 2–4, WBS	—	—	—
2005–06	80	35	37	—	4	4	78	.488	258	295	5th, East	2006	—	Did not qualify			
2006–07	80	23	48	—	4	5	55	.344	225	323	7th, East	2007	—	Did not qualify			
2007–08	80	34	32	—	9	5	82	.513	255	248	6th, East	2008	—	Did not qualify			
2008–09	80	41	30	—	5	4	91	.569	232	238	5th, East	2009	—	Did not qualify			
2009–10	80	36	35	—	6	3	81	.506	251	260	5th, East	2010	—	Did not qualify			
2010–11	80	42	30	—	3	5	91	.575	255	221	5th, East	2011	—	W, 4–3, MAN	W, 4–2, POR	W, 4–0, CHA	W, 4–2 HOU
2011–12	76	29	40	—	5	2	65	.428	201	243	5th, East	2012	—	Did not qualify			
2012–13	76	44	24	—	1	7	96	.632	227	188	2nd, East	2013	—	L, 0–3, WBS	—	—	—
2013–14	76	44	24	—	3	5	96	.632	276	232	1st, East	2014	—	L, 1–3, WBS	—	—	—
2014–15	76	34	34	—	7	1	76	.500	242	258	3rd, East	2015	—	Did not qualify			
2015–16	76	31	38	—	6	1	69	.454	204	241	7th, North	2016	—	Did not qualify			
2016–17	76	28	44	—	2	2	60	.395	190	266	7th, North	2017	—	Did not qualify			

== Players ==
=== Team captains ===
- Steve Martins, 2002–2003
- Brian Pothier, 2002–2003
- Chris Kelly, 2003–2005
- Denis Hamel, 2005–2006, 2007–2010
- Jamie Allison, 2006–2007
- Drew Bannister, 2009-2010
- Ryan Keller, 2010–2011
- Mark Parrish, 2011–2012
- Andre Benoit, 2012–2013
- Mike Hoffman, 2013–2014
- Mark Borowiecki, 2013–2014
- Aaron Johnson. 2014–2015
- Zack Stortini, 2015–2016
- Mike Blunden, 2016–2017

=== Notable players ===
- Casey Bailey
- Cody Bass
- Ben Bishop
- Brandon Bochenski
- Mark Borowiecki
- Bobby Butler
- Cody Ceci
- Kaspars Daugavins
- Patrick Eaves
- Brian Elliott
- Ray Emery
- Denis Hamel
- Eric Gryba
- Mike Hoffman
- Erik Karlsson
- Ryan Keller
- Chris Kelly
- Rob Klinkhammer
- Robin Lehner
- Brian McGrattan
- Mike McKenna
- Chris Neil
- Jean-Gabriel Pageau
- Brian Pothier
- Shane Prince
- Christoph Schubert
- Jakob Silfverberg
- Jason Spezza
- Mark Stone
- Antoine Vermette
- Anton Volchenkov
- Patrick Wiercioch
- Jeremy Yablonski
- Mika Zibanejad

=== American Hockey League Hall of Famers ===
AHL Hall of Fame Honored Members
Name	Seasons	Induction Year
Dennis Bonvie	2002-04 (player)	2024
Alexandre Giroux	2002-04 (player)	2026
Denis Hamel	2003-06, 2007-10 (player)	2020
John Paddock	2002-05 (head coach)	2010
Brad Smyth	2002-03 (player)	2019

== Team records ==
=== Single season ===
Goals: Denis Hamel, 56 (2005–06)
Assists: Jason Spezza, 85 (2004–05)
Points: Jason Spezza, 117 (2004–05)
Penalty minutes: Brian McGrattan, 551 (2004–05)
GAA: Robin Lehner, 2.12 (2012–13)
SV%: Robin Lehner, .938 (2012–13)

=== Career ===
Career goals: Denis Hamel, 203
Career assists: Denis Hamel, 189
Career points: Denis Hamel, 392
Career penalty minutes: Brian McGrattan, 1051
Career goaltending wins: Ray Emery, 67
Career shutouts: Ray Emery, 11
Career games: Denis Hamel, 528

=== Franchise scoring leaders ===
Note: Pos = Position; GP = Games played; G = Goals; A = Assists; Pts = Points; P/G = Points per game average;

Player	Pos	GP	G	A	Pts	P/G
Denis Hamel	LW	438	203	189	392	0.89
Josh Hennessy	C	289	99	114	213	0.74
Cole Schneider	RW	263	83	108	191	0.73
Jason Spezza	C	123	54	117	171	1.39
Mike Hoffman	C	242	71	98	169	0.62
Shane Prince	LW	206	67	81	148	0.72
Derek Smith	D	272	33	109	142	0.52
Jeff Heerema	RW	155	63	78	141	0.91
Antoine Vermette	C	161	62	73	135	0.84
Stephane Da Costa	C	159	44	88	132	0.83

Totals contain only games played for Binghamton.
