= List of Ottawa Senators award winners =

Ottawa Senators awards
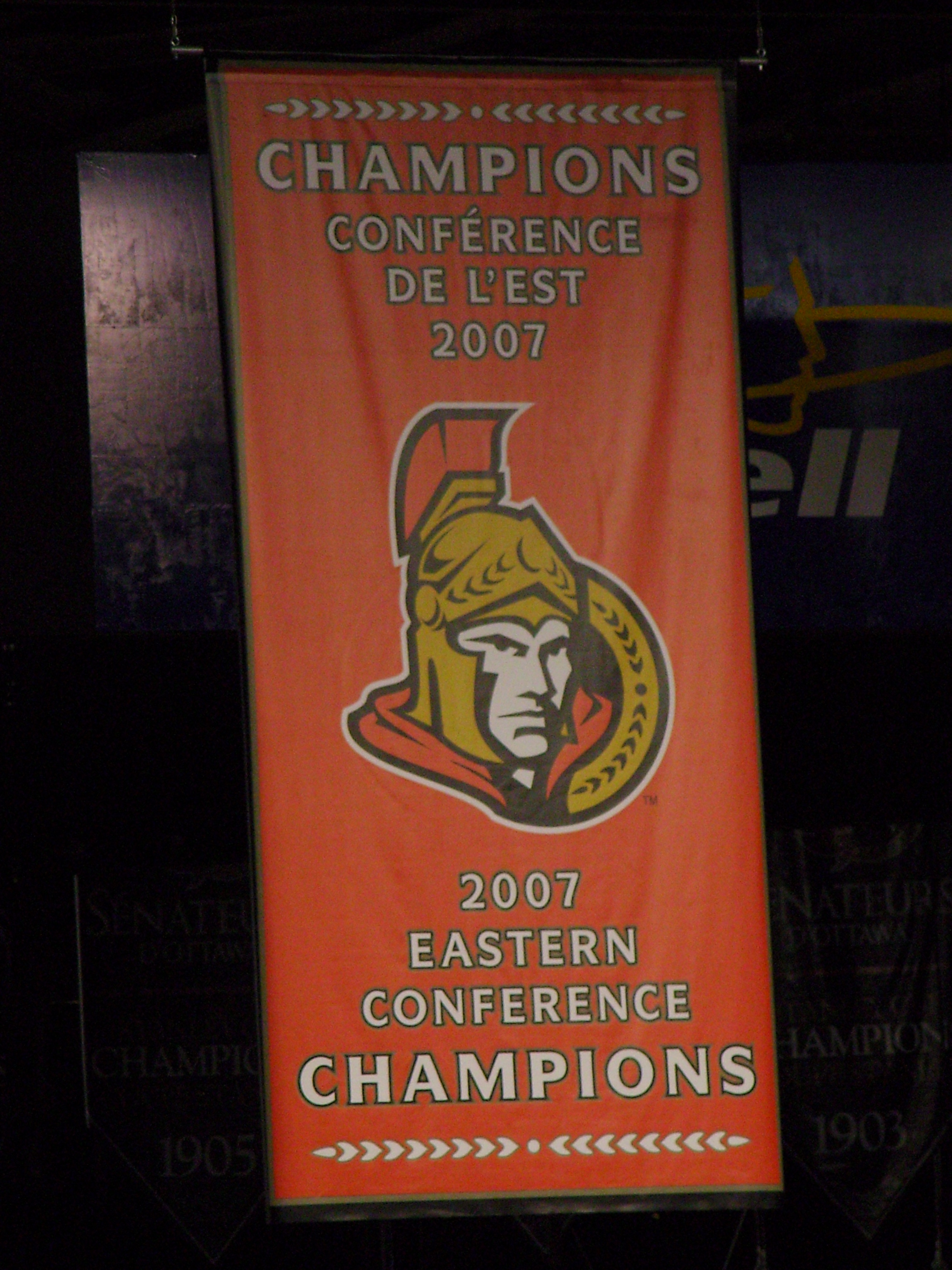
- 2006–07 Eastern Conference Championship banner

Team trophies
- Award*: Wins
- Stanley Cup: 0
- Prince of Wales Trophy: 1
- Presidents' Trophy: 1

Individual awards
- Award*: Wins
- Bill Masterton Memorial Trophy: 2
- Calder Memorial Trophy: 1
- Jack Adams Award: 2
- James Norris Memorial Trophy: 2
- King Clancy Memorial Trophy: 1
- Mark Messier Leadership Award: 1
- NHL Plus-Minus Award: 1

Total
- Awards won: 12

Note: This article does not include any player or data of the original Ottawa Senators.

This is a list of Ottawa Senators award winners.

== League awards ==
=== Team trophies ===
Team trophies awarded to the Ottawa Senators
Award	Description	Times won	Seasons	References
Prince of Wales Trophy	Eastern Conference playoff championship	1	2006–07	
Presidents' Trophy	Most regular season points	1	2002–03	

=== Individual awards ===
Individual awards won by Ottawa Senators players and staff
Award	Description	Winner	Season	References
Bill Masterton Memorial Trophy	Perseverance, sportsmanship and dedication to hockey	Craig Anderson	2016–17	
Bill Masterton Memorial Trophy	Perseverance, sportsmanship and dedication to hockey	Bobby Ryan	2019–20	
Calder Memorial Trophy	Rookie of the year	Daniel Alfredsson	1995–96	
Jack Adams Award	Top coach during the regular season	Jacques Martin	1998–99	
Jack Adams Award	Top coach during the regular season	Paul MacLean	2012–13	
James Norris Memorial Trophy	Top defenceman during the regular season	Erik Karlsson	2011–12	
James Norris Memorial Trophy	Top defenceman during the regular season	Erik Karlsson	2014–15	
King Clancy Memorial Trophy	Leadership qualities on and off the ice and humanitarian contributions within their community	Daniel Alfredsson	2011–12	
Mark Messier Leadership Award	Player who exemplifies leadership on and off the ice	Daniel Alfredsson	2012–13	
NHL Plus-Minus Award	Highest plus/minus	Wade Redden	2005–06	

== All-Stars ==
=== NHL first and second team All-Stars ===
The NHL first and second team All-Stars are the top players at each position as voted on by the Professional Hockey Writers' Association.

Ottawa Senators selected to the NHL First and Second Team All-Stars
Player	Position	Selections	Season	Team
Daniel Alfredsson	Right wing	1	2005–06	2nd
Zdeno Chara	Defence	2	2003–04	1st
Zdeno Chara	Defence	2	2005–06	2nd
Dany Heatley	Left wing	2	2005–06	2nd
Dany Heatley	Right wing	2	2006–07	1st
Erik Karlsson	Defence	4	2011–12	1st
Erik Karlsson	Defence	4	2014–15	1st
Erik Karlsson	Defence	4	2015–16	1st
Erik Karlsson	Defence	4	2016–17	1st
Alexei Yashin	Centre	1	1998–99	2nd

=== NHL All-Rookie Team ===
The NHL All-Rookie Team consists of the top rookies at each position as voted on by the Professional Hockey Writers' Association.

Ottawa Senators selected to the NHL All-Rookie Team
Player	Position	Season
Daniel Alfredsson	Forward	1995–96
Martin Havlat	Forward	2000–01
Marian Hossa	Forward	1998–99
Andrej Meszaros	Defence	2005–06
Josh Norris	Forward	2020–21
Sami Salo	Defence	1998–99
Jake Sanderson	Defence	2022–23
Mark Stone	Forward	2014–15
Brady Tkachuk	Forward	2018–19

=== All-Star Game selections ===
The National Hockey League All-Star Game is a mid-season exhibition game held annually between many of the top players of each season. Twenty-one All-Star Games have been held since the Ottawa Senators entered the league in 1992, with at least one player chosen to represent the Senators in each year. The All-Star game has not been held in various years: 1979 and 1987 due to the 1979 Challenge Cup and Rendez-vous '87 series between the NHL and the Soviet national team, respectively, 1995, 2005, and 2013 as a result of labor stoppages, 2006, 2010, 2014 and 2026 because of the Winter Olympic Games, 2021 as a result of the COVID-19 pandemic, and 2025 when it was replaced by the 2025 4 Nations Face-Off. Ottawa has hosted one of the games. The 59th took place at the Canadian Tire Centre, then known as Scotiabank Place.

- † Selected by fan vote
- ‡ Selected by Commissioner

Ottawa Senators players and coaches selected to the All-Star Game
Game	Year	Name	Position	References
44th	1993	Brad Marsh‡	Defence	
44th	1993	Peter Sidorkiewicz	Goaltender	
45th	1994	Alexei Yashin	Centre	
46th	1996	Daniel Alfredsson	Right wing	
47th	1997	Daniel Alfredsson	Right wing	
48th	1998	Daniel Alfredsson	Right wing	
48th	1998	Igor Kravchuk	Defence	
49th	1999	Ron Tugnutt	Goaltender	
49th	1999	Alexei Yashin	Centre	
50th	2000	Radek Bonk	Centre	
51st	2001	Radek Bonk	Centre	
51st	2001	Marian Hossa	Right wing	
51st	2001	Jacques Martin	Coach	
52nd	2002	Wade Redden	Defence	
53rd	2003	Zdeno Chara	Defence	
53rd	2003	Marian Hossa	Right wing	
53rd	2003	Patrick Lalime	Goaltender	
53rd	2003	Jacques Martin	Coach	
54th	2004	Daniel Alfredsson	Right wing	
54th	2004	Marian Hossa (Did not play)	Right wing	
54th	2004	Wade Redden (Did not play)	Defence	
55th	2007	Dany Heatley	Left wing	
56th	2008	Daniel Alfredsson†	Right wing	
56th	2008	Dany Heatley (Did not play)	Left wing	
56th	2008	Jason Spezza	Centre	
57th	2009	Dany Heatley	Left wing	
58th	2011	Erik Karlsson	Defence	
59th	2012	Daniel Alfredsson†	Right wing	
59th	2012	Erik Karlsson†	Defence	
59th	2012	Milan Michalek†	Left wing	
59th	2012	Jason Spezza†	Centre	
60th	2015	Bobby Ryan	Right wing	
61st	2016	Erik Karlsson	Defence	
62nd	2017	Erik Karlsson	Defence	
63rd	2018	Erik Karlsson	Defence	
64th	2019	Thomas Chabot	Defence	
65th	2020	Anthony Duclair	Left wing	
65th	2020	Brady Tkachuk (Replaced Auston Matthews)	Left wing	
66th	2022	Drake Batherson (Did not play)	Centre	
66th	2022	Brady Tkachuk (Replaced Batherson)	Left wing	
67th	2023	Brady Tkachuk	Left wing	
68th	2024	Brady Tkachuk	Left wing	

=== All-Star Game replacement events ===
Ottawa Senators players and coaches selected to All-Star Game replacement events
Event	Year	Name	Position	References
4 Nations Face-Off	2025	Nikolas Matinpalo (Finland)	Defense	
4 Nations Face-Off	2025	Jake Sanderson (United States)	Defense	
4 Nations Face-Off	2025	Linus Ullmark (Sweden)	Goaltender	
4 Nations Face-Off	2025	Brady Tkachuk (United States)	Left wing	

== Career achievements ==
=== Hockey Hall of Fame ===
The following is a list of Ottawa Senators who have been enshrined in the Hockey Hall of Fame.

Ottawa Senators inducted into the Hockey Hall of Fame
Individual	Category	Year inducted	Years with Senators in category	References
Daniel Alfredsson	Player	2022	1995–2013	
Tom Barrasso	Player	2023	2000	
Zdeno Chára	Player	2025	2001–2006	
Dominik Hasek	Player	2014	2005–2006	
Marian Hossa	Player	2020	1997–2004	
Roger Neilson	Builder	2002	2001–2003	

=== Foster Hewitt Memorial Award ===
One member of the Senators organization has been honored with the Foster Hewitt Memorial Award. The award is presented by the Hockey Hall of Fame to members of the radio and television industry who make outstanding contributions to their profession and the game of ice hockey during their broadcasting career.

Members of the Ottawa Senators honored with the Foster Hewitt Memorial Award
Individual	Year honored	Years with Senators as broadcaster	References
Chris Cuthbert	2026	2014–2020^{a}	

=== Retired numbers ===
The Ottawa Senators have retired four of their jersey numbers. Also out of circulation is the number 99 which was retired league-wide for Wayne Gretzky on February 6, 2000. Gretzky did not play for the Senators during his 20-year NHL career and no Senators player had ever worn the number 99 prior to its retirement.

Ottawa Senators retired numbers
Number	Player	Position	Years with Senators as a player	Date of retirement ceremony	References
4	Chris Phillips	Defence	1997–2015	February 18, 2020	
8	Frank Finnigan	Right wing	1923–1931, 1932–1934^{[b]}	October 8, 1992	
11	Daniel Alfredsson	Right wing	1995–2013	December 29, 2016	
25	Chris Neil	Right wing	2001–2017	February 17, 2023	

== Team awards ==
=== Molson Cup ===
The Molson Cup is an annual award given to the player who earns the most points from three-star selections during the regular season.

Season	Winner
1992–93	Sylvain Turgeon
1993–94	Alexei Yashin
1994–95	Don Beaupre
1995–96	Damian Rhodes
1996–97	Alexei Yashin
1997–98	Alexei Yashin
1998–99	Alexei Yashin
1999–00	Marian Hossa
2000–01	Patrick Lalime

Season	Winner
2001–02	Daniel Alfredsson
2002–03	Daniel Alfredsson
2003–04	Daniel Alfredsson
2005–06	Daniel Alfredsson
2006–07	Ray Emery
2007–08	Martin Gerber
2008–09	Daniel Alfredsson
2009–10	Brian Elliott
2010–11	Jason Spezza

Season	Winner
2011–12	Craig Anderson
2012–13	Craig Anderson
2013–14	Craig Anderson
2014–15	Erik Karlsson
2015–16	Erik Karlsson
2016–17	Erik Karlsson
2017–18	Erik Karlsson

== Other awards ==
Ottawa Senators who have received non-NHL awards
Award	Description	Winner	Season	References
Viking Award	Most valuable Swedish player in NHL	Erik Karlsson	2011–12	
Viking Award	Most valuable Swedish player in NHL	Erik Karlsson	2015–16	
Viking Award	Most valuable Swedish player in NHL	Erik Karlsson	2016–17	

== Footnotes ==
- ^{a} From 2014 to 2020, Cuthbert called a partial schedule of Senators games on TSN while concurrently calling games with the Toronto Maple Leafs on the same network. Cuthbert split duties on both teams with Gord Miller.
- ^{b} Finnigan was honoured for his playing career with the original Ottawa Senators. He was the last surviving Senator from the Stanley Cup winners of 1927 and participated in the 'Bring Back The Senators' campaign.

== See also ==
- List of National Hockey League awards
