= List of Ottawa Senators records =

This is a list of franchise records for the Ottawa Senators (established 1992) of the National Hockey League, not including shortened seasons.

== Club records ==
As of August 2022

=== Points ===
- Most points: 113 (2002–03, 2005–06)
- Most points, home: 61 (2005–06)
- Most points, away: 53 (2002–03)
- Fewest points: 24 (1992–93)
- Fewest points, home: 20 (1993–94)
- Fewest points, away: 2 (1992–93)

=== Wins ===
- Most wins, overall: 52 (2002–03, 2005–06)
- Most wins, home: 29 (2005–06)
- Most wins, away: 24 (2002–03)
- Fewest wins, overall: 10 (1992–93)
- Fewest wins, home: 8 (1993–94)
- Fewest wins, away: 1† (1992–93)

=== Regulation losses ===
- Most losses, overall: 70 (1992–93)
- Most losses, home: 30 (1993–94)
- Most losses, away: 40† (1992–93)
- Fewest losses, overall: 21 (1998–99, 2000–01, 2002–03, 2005–06)
- Fewest losses, home: 7 (1997–98)
- Fewest losses, away: 10 (1998–99)

=== Overtime losses ===
- Most losses, overall: 14 (2013-14)
- Most losses, home: 8 (2016-17)
- Most losses, away: 8 (2013–14, 2014–15)
- Fewest losses, overall: 1 (2002–03)
- Fewest losses, home: 1 (2002-03)
- Fewest losses, away: 0 (1990-00, 2002-03)

=== Ties ===
- Most ties, overall: 15 (1996–97, 1997–98, 1998–99)
- Most ties, home: 8 (1996–97, 1998–99, 2002–03)
- Most ties, away: 8 (1997–98)
- Fewest ties, overall: 4 (1992–93)
- Fewest ties, home: 3 (2001–02)
- Fewest ties, away: 0† (1992–93)

=== Longest streaks ===
- Winning streak, overall: 11 (January 14, 2010 – February 4, 2010)
- Winning streak, home: 9 (March 5, 2009 – April 7, 2009)
- Winning streak, away: 6 (March 18, 2003 – April 5, 2003, January 14, 2010 – February 3, 2010)
- Losing streak: 14 (March 3, 1993 – April 7, 1993)
- Losing streak, home: 11† (October 27, 1993 – December 8, 1993)
- Losing streak, away: 38† (October 10, 1992 – April 3, 1993)
- Unbeaten streak: 11 (4x) (last: January 14, 2010 – February 4, 2010)
- Unbeaten streak, home: 12 (December 18, 2003 – January 24, 2004 (10–0–2–0))
- Unbeaten streak, away: 7 (3×) (last: November 25, 2003 – January 8, 2004 (5–0–2–0))
- Winless streak: 21 (October 10, 1992 – November 23, 1992 (0–20–1))
- Winless streak, home: 17 (October 28, 1995 – January 27, 1996 (0–15–2))
- Winless streak, away: 38† (October 10, 1992 – April 3, 1993 (0–38–0))

=== Goals ===
- Most goals, period: 6 (March 21, 2000, 1st period vs Atlanta (7–1))
- Most goals, game: 11 (November 13, 2001, at Washington (11–5))
- Most goals, season: 312 (2005–06)
- Most allowed, period: 7 (December 17, 1993, 2nd period at Washington (2–11))
- Most allowed, game: 12 (October 30, 1992, at Buffalo (3–12))
- Most allowed, season: 397 (1993–94)

Power play:

- Most, period: 3 (8x) (last: October 10, 2015, 2nd period at Toronto (5–4))
- Most, game: 6 (December 17, 2005, vs Toronto (8–2))
- Most, season: 102 (2005–06)
- Most allowed, period: 4 (December 9, 1998, 1st period at Florida (5–6))
- Most allowed, game: 5 (5×) (last: December 10, 2006, at Columbus (2–6))
- Most allowed, season: 115 (1992–93)

Short-handed:

- Most, period: 2 (7×), (last: January 27, 2020, 3rd period vs New Jersey (3–4))
- Most, game: 3 (4×), (last: March 19, 2016, vs Montreal (5–0))
- Most, season: 25 (2005–06)
- Most allowed, period: 2 (3x), (last: February 16, 2019, 1st period at Winnipeg (4–3))
- Most allowed, game: 3 (March 2, 2000, at New York Islanders (5–5))
- Most allowed, season: 14 (1993–94, 1995–96)

=== Shutouts ===
- Most shutouts, overall: 10 (2001–02, 2016-17, 2024–2025‡)
- Most shutouts, home: 6 (2001–02)
- Most shutouts, away: 6 (1997–98, 2024–2025‡)
- Most allowed, overall: 10 (1997–98, 2017-18)
- Most allowed, home: 6 (2010-11)
- Most allowed, away: 8 (2017-18)

=== Penalties ===
- Most PIM, period: 200 (March 5, 2004, 3rd period, at Philadelphia)
- Most PIM, game: 206 (March 5, 2004, at Philadelphia)
- Most PIM, season: 1716 (1992–93)

Notes:

- † NHL record
- ‡ Surpassed in (current) season

Source: Ottawa Senators

== Individual records ==
Franchise record	Name of player	Statistic	Year(s)
Most goals in a season	Dany Heatley	50	2005–06; 2006–07
Longest goal streak	Connor Brown	8	2020-2021
Most goals in a season, defenceman	Erik Karlsson	21	2014-15
Most assists in a season	Jason Spezza	71	2005–06
Most assists in a season, defenceman	Erik Karlsson	66	2015-16
Most points in a season	Dany Heatley	105	2006–07
Most points in a season, defenceman	Erik Karlsson	82	2015–16
Most points in a season, rookie	Alexei Yashin	79	1993–94
Most penalty minutes in a season	Mike Peluso	318	1992–93
Highest +/– rating in a season	Daniel Alfredsson	+42	2006–07
Most playoff games played	Daniel Alfredsson	121	(milestone)
Most goaltender wins in a season	Patrick Lalime	39	2002–03
Most shutouts in a season	Patrick Lalime	8	2002–03
Lowest GAA in a season	Craig Anderson	1.69	2012–13
Best save percentage in a season	Craig Anderson	.941	2012–13

Source: Ottawa Senators

== See also ==
- List of Ottawa Senators players
- List of NHL players
