= 1998 Air Canada Cup =

Tournament details
- Venue: Sudbury Community Arena in Sudbury, ON
- Dates: April 21–26, 1998
- Teams: 6

Final positions
- Champions: Riverains du Collège Charles-Lemoyne
- Runners-up: Sudbury Cara's Nickel Capitals
- Third place: Calgary Buffaloes

Tournament statistics
- Scoring leader: Dany Heatley

Awards
- MVP: Dany Heatley

The 1998 Air Canada Cup was Canada's 20th annual national midget 'AAA' hockey championship, played April 21–26, 1998 at the Sudbury Community Arena in Sudbury, Ontario. The Riverains du Collège Charles-Lemoyne defeated the host Sudbury Cara's Nickel Capitals in the championship game to win the gold medal. The Calgary Buffaloes won the bronze medal. Calgary's Dany Heatley was the tournament's top scorer and most valuable player. Other future National Hockey League players playing in this tournament were Sheldon Brookbank, Randy Jones and Krys Kolanos.

== Teams ==
Result	Team	Region	City
1st place, gold medalist(s)	Riverains de Collège Charles-Lemoyne	Quebec	Sainte-Catherine, QC
2nd place, silver medalist(s)	Sudbury Cara's Nickel Capitals	Host	Sudbury, ON
3rd place, bronze medalist(s)	Calgary Buffaloes	Pacific	Calgary, AB
4	Saskatoon Contacts	West	Saskatoon, SK
5	Saint John Flames	Atlantic	Saint John, NB
6	Don Mills Flyers	Central	Toronto, ON

== Round robin ==
=== Standings ===
Pos	Team	Pld	W	L	D	GF	GA	GD	Pts
1	Calgary Buffaloes	5	4	0	1	34	17	+17	9
2	Saskatoon Contacts	5	4	1	0	27	12	+15	8
3	Riverains du Collège Charles-Lemoyne	5	2	1	2	25	20	+5	6
4	Sudbury Cara's Nickel Capitals	5	2	2	1	25	25	0	5
5	Saint John Flames	5	2	3	0	20	17	+3	4
6	Don Mills Flyers	5	0	5	0	7	30	−23	0

=== Scores ===
- Collège Charles-Lemoyne 7 - Don Mills 0
- Calgary 6 - Saint John 5
- Saskatoon 7 - Sudbury 2
- Collège Charles-Lemoyne 6 - Saint John 2
- Saskatoon 7 - Don Mills 2
- Calgary 9 - Sudbury 2
- Saint John 4 - Don Mills 2
- Saskatoon 6 - Collège Charles-Lemoyne 1
- Calgary 7 - Don Mills 1
- Sudbury 9 - Saint John 0
- Calgary 7 - Saskatoon 4
- Sudbury 5 - Don Mills 2
- Collège Charles-Lemoyne 5 - Calgary 5
- Saskatoon 3 - Saint John 0
- Sudbury 7 - Collège Charles-Lemoyne 7

== Playoffs ==
=== Semi-finals ===
- Collège Charles-Lemoyne 3 - Saskatoon 2
- Sudbury 5 - Calgary 2

=== Bronze-medal game ===
- Calgary 5 - Saskatoon 4

=== Gold-medal game ===
- Collège Charles-Lemoyne 5 - Sudbury 4

== Individual awards ==
- Most Valuable Player: Dany Heatley (Calgary)
- Top Scorer: Dany Heatley (Calgary)
- Top Forward: Adrian Foster (Calgary)
- Top Defenceman: Shawn Landry (Calgary)
- Top Goaltender: Chad Yaremko (Regina)
- Most Sportsmanlike Player: Krys Kolanos (Calgary)

== See also ==
- Telus Cup
