= List of Atlanta Thrashers records =

This is a list of franchise records for the Atlanta Thrashers of the National Hockey League.

== Franchise records ==
=== Franchise single season ===
Most Points	97	2006–07
Most Wins	43	2006–07
Most Losses	57	1999–2000
Most Ties^{†}	12	2000–01
Most Overtime Losses^{‡}	13	2009–10
Most Goals For	281	2005–06
Most Goals Against	313	1999–2000
Fewest Points	39	1999–2000
Fewest Wins	14	1999–2000
Fewest Losses	28	2006–07
Fewest Ties^{†}	7	1999–2000, 2002–03
Fewest Overtime Losses^{‡}	2	2000–01
Fewest Goals For	170	1999–2000
Fewest Goals Against	243	2003–04
Most Penalty Minutes	1,505	2003–04
Fewest Penalty Minutes		
Most Shutouts	5	2005–06, (Kari Lehtonen 2, Michael Garnett 2, Mike Dunham 1), 2009–10, (Johan Hedberg 3, Ondrej Pavelec 2)

- † Ties are no longer an official NHL statistic since the end of the 2003–04 NHL season
- ‡ Overtime losses became an official NHL statistic in the 1999–2000 NHL season and replaced the 'tie' statistic beginning in the 2005–06 NHL season

=== Franchise single game ===
Most Goals Total	14	January 19, 2006, at Los Angeles Kings
Most Goals For	9	November 12, 2005, at Carolina Hurricanes
Most Goals Against	10	January 18, 2008, at Buffalo Sabres
Largest Margin of Victory	9	November 12, 2005, at Carolina Hurricanes
Largest Margin of Defeat	9	March 10, 2000, vs. New Jersey Devils
Most Shots For	50	December 21, 2009, vs Montreal Canadiens
Least Shots For	11	Latest – October 5, 2006, vs. Tampa Bay Lightning
Most Shots Against	55	December 18, 2001, at Boston Bruins
Least Shots Against	15	November 19, 2002, vs. Florida Panthers
Most Penalty Minutes	103	February 11, 2004, at Edmonton Oilers
Most Penalty Minutes, Opponent	95	February 11, 2004, at Edmonton Oilers
Fastest Goal	0:08	December 20, 2003, at Pittsburgh Penguins
Longest Game		

=== Streaks ===
Winning Streaks
Overall	6	March 6, 2009 – March 16, 2009
Home	7	March 2, 2007 – March 16, 2007
Away	4	Latest – February 3, 2009 – February 16, 2009
Losing Streaks
Overall	12	January 24, 2000 – February 20, 2000
Home	11	January 24, 2000 – March 16, 2000
Away	10	October 6, 2001 – November 18, 2001
Undefeated Streaks
Overall	6	March 6, 2009 – March 16, 2009 (6–0–0)
Home	7	March 2, 2007 – March 16, 2007 (7–0–0)
Away	7	October 21, 2000 – November 13, 2000 (3–0–4)
Winless Streaks
Overall	16	January 16, 2000 – February 20, 2000 (0–13–2–1)
Home	17	January 19, 2000 – March 29, 2000 (0–14–2–1)
Away	10	October 6, 2001 – November 18, 2001 (0–8–0–2)
Consecutive Playoff Appearances
1		2006–07 season

== Individual records ==
=== Career leaders ===
	All-time leader		Active leader^{‡}	
Games	594	Ilya Kovalchuk	354	Jim Slater
Consecutive Games	271	Tobias Enstrom	271	Tobias Enstrom
Points	615	Ilya Kovalchuk	120	Tobias Enstrom
Points (defenseman)	141	Tobias Enstrom	141	Tobias Enstrom
Goals	328	Ilya Kovalchuk	54	Bryan Little
Goals (defenseman)	33	Yannick Tremblay	20	Dustin Byfuglien
Power Play Goals	115	Ilya Kovalchuk	17	Bryan Little
Shorthanded Goals	12	Marian Hossa	4	Jim Slater
Game Winning Goals	40	Ilya Kovalchuk	13	Rich Peverley
Overtime Goals	8	Ilya Kovalchuk	2	Dustin Byfuglien
Hat Tricks	11	Ilya Kovalchuk	1	Bryan Little
Assists	287	Ilya Kovalchuk	140	Tobias Enstrom
Assists (defenseman)	140	Tobias Enstrom	140	Tobias Enstrom
Plus/Minus	21	Marian Hossa	6	Tobias Enstrom
Shots	2,178	Ilya Kovalchuk	528	Jim Slater
Penalty minutes	569	Eric Boulton	569	Eric Boulton
Goaltender Games	158	Kari Lehtonen	76	Ondrej Pavelec
Goaltender Minutes	9,046	Kari Lehtonen	4,003	Ondrej Pavelec
Goaltender Wins	75	Kari Lehtonen	27	Ondrej Pavelec
Shutouts	11	Kari Lehtonen	4	Ondrej Pavelec
Goals Against Average^{†}	2.78	Kari Lehtonen	3.01	Ondrej Pavelec
Save Percentage^{††}	.918	Kari Lehtonen	.910	Ondrej Pavelec
Goaltender Assists	5	Pasi Nurminen	0	Ondrej Pavelec
Coaching Wins	137	Bob Hartley	13	Craig Ramsay

- ‡ Before the start of the 2010–11 NHL season
- † Minimum 50 games played
- †† Minimum 500 shots against

=== Single season leaders ===
	All-time leader	
Points	100	Marian Hossa (43G, 57A, 2006–07)
Points (defenseman)	53	Dustin Byfuglien (20G, 33A, 2010–11)
Points (rookie)	67	Dany Heatley (26G, 41A, 2001–02)
Goals	52	Ilya Kovalchuk (2005–06), (2007–08)
Goals (defenseman)	20	Dustin Byfuglien (2010-11)
Goals (rookie)	29	Ilya Kovalchuk (2001–02)
Power Play Goals	27	Ilya Kovalchuk (2005–06)
Shorthanded Goals	7	Marian Hossa (2005–06)
Game Winning Goals	8	Vyacheslav Kozlov (2006–07)
Overtime Goals	?	?
Assists	69	Marc Savard (2005–06)
Assists (defenseman)	44	Tobias Enstrom (2009–10)
Assists (rookie)	41	Dany Heatley (2001–02)
Plus/Minus	+18	Marian Hossa (2005–06)
Shots	347	Dustin Byfuglien (2010–11)
Penalty minutes	226	Jeff Odgers (2000–01)
Goaltender Games	68	Kari Lehtonen (2006–07)
Goaltender Wins	34	Kari Lehtonen (2006–07)
Shutouts	4	Kari Lehtonen (2006–07, 2007–08)
Goals Against Average	2.77	Pasi Nurminen (2003–04)
Save Percentage	.916	Kari Lehtonen (2007–08)
Goaltender Assists	3	Pasi Nurminen (2002–03)

- † Minimum 20 games played
- †† Minimum 400 shots against

=== Single game leaders ===
	All-time leader
Points (rookie)	
Points (Single Period)	
Goals (defenseman)	
Goals (rookie)	
Goals (Single Period)	
Power Play Goals	
Shorthanded Goals	
Assists	
Assists (defenseman)	
Assists (rookie)	
Assists (Single Period)	?
Shots	
Penalty minutes	
Goaltender Shots Against	
Goaltender Saves	
