= Jason Spezza =

Canadian ice hockey player (born 1983)

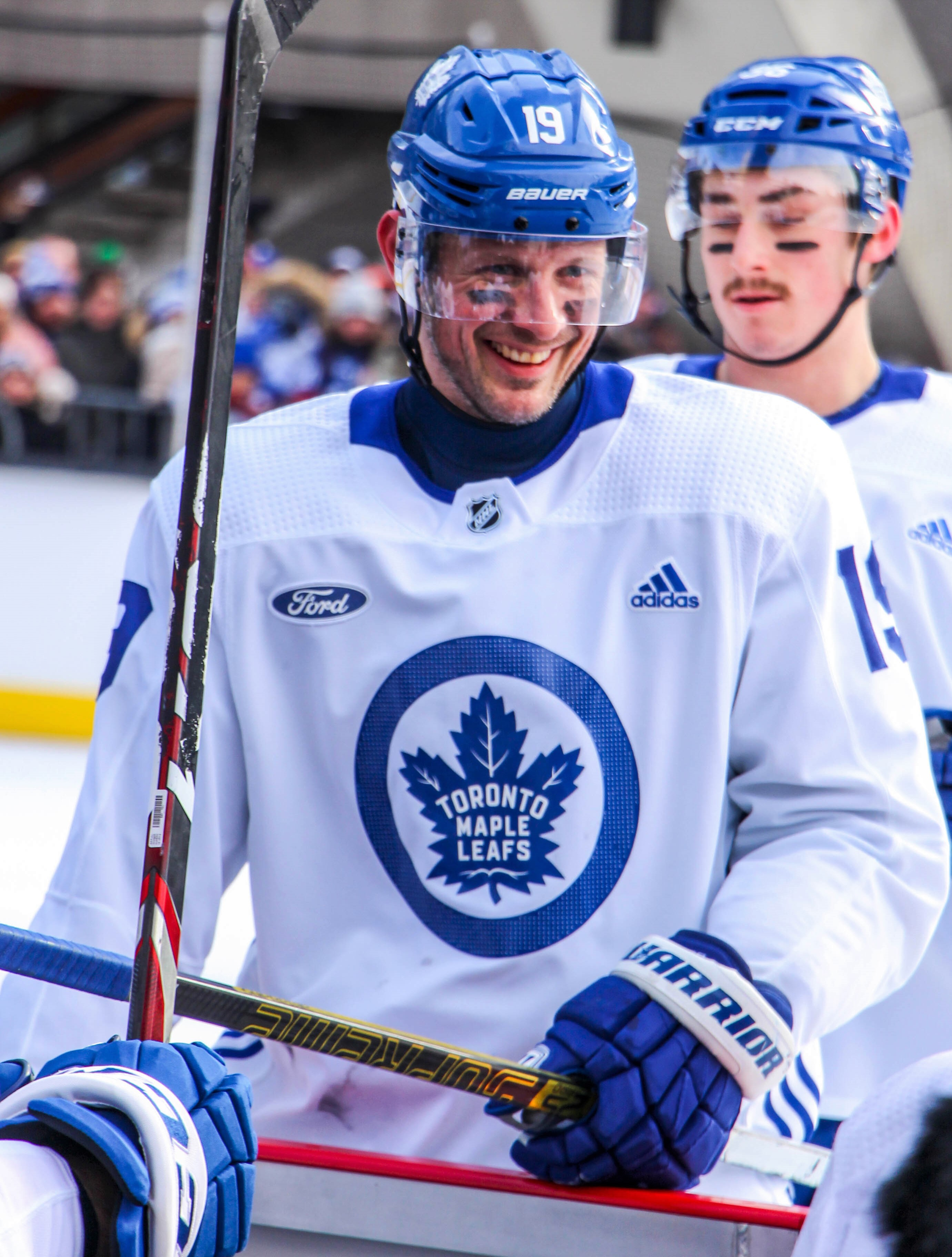
- Spezza with the Toronto Maple Leafs in January 2020
- Born: June 13, 1983 (age 43) Mississauga, Ontario, Canada
- Height: 6 ft 3 in (191 cm)
- Weight: 214 lb (97 kg; 15 st 4 lb)
- Position: Centre
- Shot: Right
- Played for: Ottawa Senators; Rapperswil-Jona Lakers; Dallas Stars; Toronto Maple Leafs
- National team: Canada
- NHL draft: 2nd overall, 2001; Ottawa Senators
- Playing career: 2002–2022

Jason Rocco Anthony Spezza (born June 13, 1983) is a Canadian ice hockey executive and former professional player. He is currently the assistant general manager of the Pittsburgh Penguins of the National Hockey League (NHL), and the general manager of their American Hockey League (AHL) affiliate, the Wilkes-Barre/Scranton Penguins. Spezza's career as an NHL centre spanned 19 seasons, from 2002 to 2022.

After beginning his major junior career at the early age of 15 in the Ontario Hockey League (OHL), Spezza was selected second overall in the 2001 NHL entry draft by the Ottawa Senators, eventually serving as their team captain following the departure of Daniel Alfredsson. Playing in the AHL in 2004–05 due to the NHL lockout, he won the Les Cunningham Award as league MVP with the Binghamton Senators. In 2005–06, Spezza set an Ottawa Senators franchise record with 71 assists, while hitting the 90-point mark for the first of two times in his NHL career. He later played for the Dallas Stars and Toronto Maple Leafs. Following his retirement, he spent a year in the Maple Leafs' front office, before taking his current role with the Penguins.

Internationally, Spezza represented Canada at three World Junior Championships and two World Championships. When he made his World Junior debut in 2000, he became the third 16-year-old in history to make the team, after Wayne Gretzky and Eric Lindros.

== Early life ==
Spezza was born on June 13, 1983, in Mississauga, Ontario. He was born to Italian parents Rino and Donna Spezza along with twin siblings Michelle and Matthew. Growing up in the Toronto area, he watched the Toronto Maple Leafs, but has cited Mario Lemieux as his favourite player as a child. Spezza attended St. Michael's College School.

At age one, Spezza won a baby contest and began his youth modelling career. The victory resulted in Spezza becoming the poster boy for Baby, a Broadway musical that played at Toronto's O'Keefe Centre in the summer of 1984. At age five, Spezza was chosen for a Minute Maid commercial. Two years later, he modelled clothing for stores Woolco and Kmart.

== Playing career ==
=== Junior ===
Spezza played for the Toronto Marlboros in 1997, recording 114 points in 54 games. At age 15, Spezza began his major junior career in the Ontario Hockey League (OHL) with the Brampton Battalion in 1998–99, under a rule permitting the then-underage player to play on his hometown team. He scored at more than a point-per-game pace as an underaged player with 71 points in 67 games. He subsequently became the youngest player ever to participate in an OHL All-Star game at age 15. After one season with the Battalion, he was required to enter the OHL Priority Draft and was selected by the Mississauga IceDogs in the team's second season in 1999–2000. He recorded 61 points in 52 games that season before requesting a trade and subsequently being dealt 15 games into the 2000–01 season to the Windsor Spitfires. Spezza went on to record an OHL career-high 116 points in 66 games that season.

Entering the 2001 NHL entry draft having been named the Top CHL Prospect, Spezza was drafted second overall by the Ottawa Senators, after Ilya Kovalchuk was selected by the Atlanta Thrashers. The second overall pick originally belonged to the New York Islanders but was traded to Ottawa (along with Zdeno Chára and Bill Muckalt) in exchange for Alexei Yashin on the day of the Draft. During the summer of 2001, Spezza passed on an invitation to the Canadian junior team's summer camp because he said he wanted to prepare for his first NHL camp.

After one more OHL season split between the Spitfires and the Belleville Bulls, resulting in a 105-point season, Spezza began his professional career in the American Hockey League (AHL). He signed his first professional contract with the Senators, a multi-year deal, on September 5, 2001.

=== Professional ===
==== Ottawa Senators (2002–2014) ====
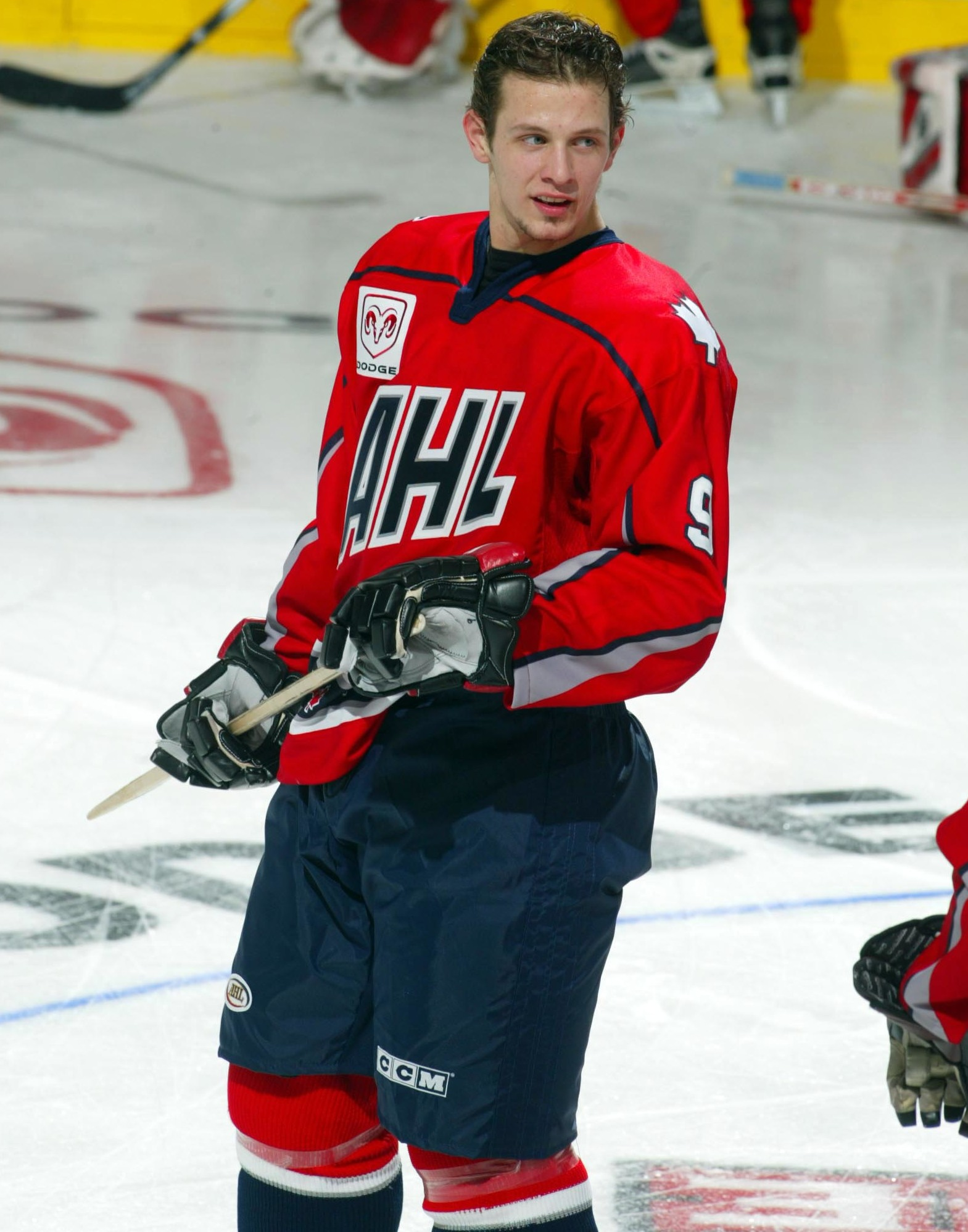
Spezza at the 2003 AHL All-Star Game. Spezza spent most of the 2002–03 season in the AHL.

Following Spezza's fourth OHL season in 2001–02, he was assigned to the Senators' AHL affiliate, the Grand Rapids Griffins. While in the 2002 Calder Cup playoffs, he made his professional debut, playing in three playoff games and scoring one goal. He made his NHL debut the next season in 2002–03 with Ottawa, playing in 33 games and recording 21 points, and scored his first NHL goal on October 29, 2002, in a 2–1 loss against the Philadelphia Flyers. However, he played the majority of the season in the AHL with Ottawa's new affiliate, the Binghamton Senators, and was called-up regularly to replace injured Ottawa players. He also competed in three Stanley Cup playoff games with Ottawa during his rookie season, helping the team in its 2003 playoff run to the Eastern Conference Finals. In his playoff debut on May 21, 2003, Spezza assisted on the game-winning goal in Game 5. The Senators came within one game of the Stanley Cup Finals, losing to the eventual Stanley Cup champion New Jersey Devils.

Spezza played his first full NHL season with the Senators in 2003–04 and scored 22 goals and 55 points in 78 games. However, due to the subsequent NHL lockout, Spezza returned to the AHL in 2004–05. Scoring 117 points with Binghamton, he outscored Michael Cammalleri of the Manchester Monarchs by eight points to capture the John B. Sollenberger Trophy as the league's leading scorer. Spezza was also awarded the Les Cunningham Award as league MVP.

With NHL play set to resume in 2005–06, Spezza returned to Ottawa. Having traded centres Radek Bonk and Todd White during the off-season, the Senators started Spezza on the first line between Dany Heatley and rookie Brandon Bochenski, who was Spezza's linemate in Binghamton. Captain Daniel Alfredsson quickly replaced Bochenski on the top line (Bochenski was soon thereafter traded) and the new trio become nicknamed the "CASH" line and "Pizza" line. Wingers Alfredsson and Heatley both finished tied for fourth in league scoring with 103 points, while Spezza tallied 90 points despite an injury-shortened 68-game season. His 71 assists established a team single-season record and was second in the league behind Joe Thornton of the San Jose Sharks (96 assists). In the 2006 playoffs, the Senators defeated the defending Stanley Cup champion and eighth-seeded Tampa Bay Lightning in the first round in five games, but fell to the fourth-seeded Buffalo Sabres in five games. Spezza added 14 points in all 10 playoff games.

During the summer of 2006, Spezza underwent successful back surgery. The following season, he continued on the same pace with Heatley and Alfredsson before suffering another injury. He managed a career-high 34 goals along with 53 assists for 87 points in 67 games as the Senators as a team finished fourth in the East. On May 19, 2007, he scored a goal and an assist as the Senators defeated the Buffalo Sabres in the Eastern Conference Final four games to one. Ottawa moved to the Stanley Cup Finals against the Anaheim Ducks, but lost to the second-seeded Ducks in five games in large part because the Spezza–Heatley–Alfredsson line failed to perform against Samuel Påhlsson's checking line, backed by star defencemen Scott Niedermayer and Chris Pronger. Spezza finished the 2007 playoffs with a franchise-record 22 points (seven goals and 15 assists), tied with linemates Alfredsson and Heatley.

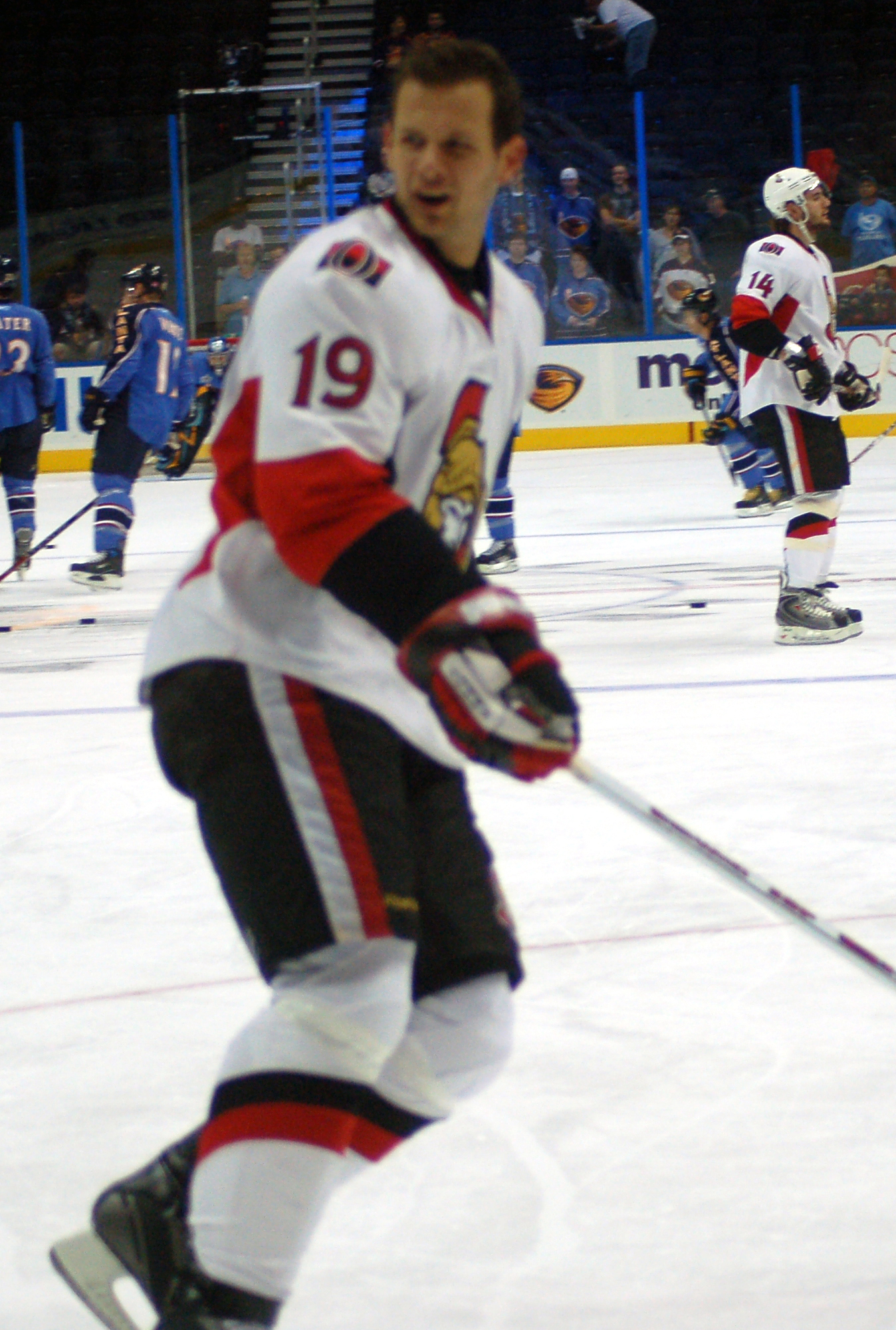
Spezza with the Ottawa Senators in October 2007.

Beginning the 2007–08 season in the final year of his contract, on November 2, 2007, Spezza signed a new seven-year, $49 million contract with the Senators effective from the 2008–09 season through to the 2014–15 season. Late that season, on February 9, 2008, Spezza scored his first NHL hat-trick during a 6–1 Senators victory over the Montreal Canadiens. Spezza contributed to all of his team's goals for a career-high six-point game. He finished the season tying his career-high in goals with 34 and establishing a new personal mark for points with 92 as the Senators finished seventh in the East. However, the Senators failed to advance past the first round following their Stanley Cup Final run the previous season, falling to the second-seeded Pittsburgh Penguins in a four-game sweep.

The 2008–09 season was a disappointing one for both Spezza and the Senators. Though he managed to remain injury-free and played in all of his team's 82 games for the first time in his NHL career, his point production decreased. Spezza managed 73 points in 82 games, and while still respectable, the numbers were his lowest totals since his first full NHL season in 2003–04. The team struggled all season long and would miss the playoffs for the first time since 1995–96, missing by 10 points.

Despite missing 22 games due to injury in the 2009–10 season, Spezza still managed to score 23 goals and pick-up 34 assists for 57 points in 60 games to finish second on the team in scoring as the Senators finished as the fifth seed in the East. In the first round of the 2010 playoffs, the Senators lost to the Pittsburgh Penguins four games to two. Spezza finished with one goal and six assists for seven points in the six games. He also led the team in shots on goal with 24. However, Spezza's poor defensive play and costly turnovers in that series resulted in him being booed by fans at Scotiabank Place, and the following off-season was rife with speculation that he would be traded. Spezza himself admitted that he would not object to a trade from Ottawa. Ultimately, no trade occurred.

On December 26, 2010, in a 3–1 win over the Pittsburgh Penguins, Spezza was checked from behind into the boards by Penguins defenceman Kris Letang. Letang received a two-minute penalty for boarding and Spezza was expected to miss four-to-six weeks due to a consequent shoulder injury. At the end of the 2010–11 season, Spezza was named an interim alternate captain for Ottawa after the team traded away Mike Fisher.

In 2011–12, Spezza was named as a permanent alternate captain for the Senators. He remained injury-free and finished fourth in league scoring with 84 points (34 goals and 50 assists) only behind the 93 points from Philadelphia Flyers forward Claude Giroux, 97 points by Tampa Bay Lightning forward Steven Stamkos and the league-leading 109 points by Pittsburgh Penguins forward Evgeni Malkin, respectively. He also earned consideration for the Hart Memorial Trophy as the regular season's most valuable player. Spezza was ultimately not a finalist for the award, finishing sixth in voting.

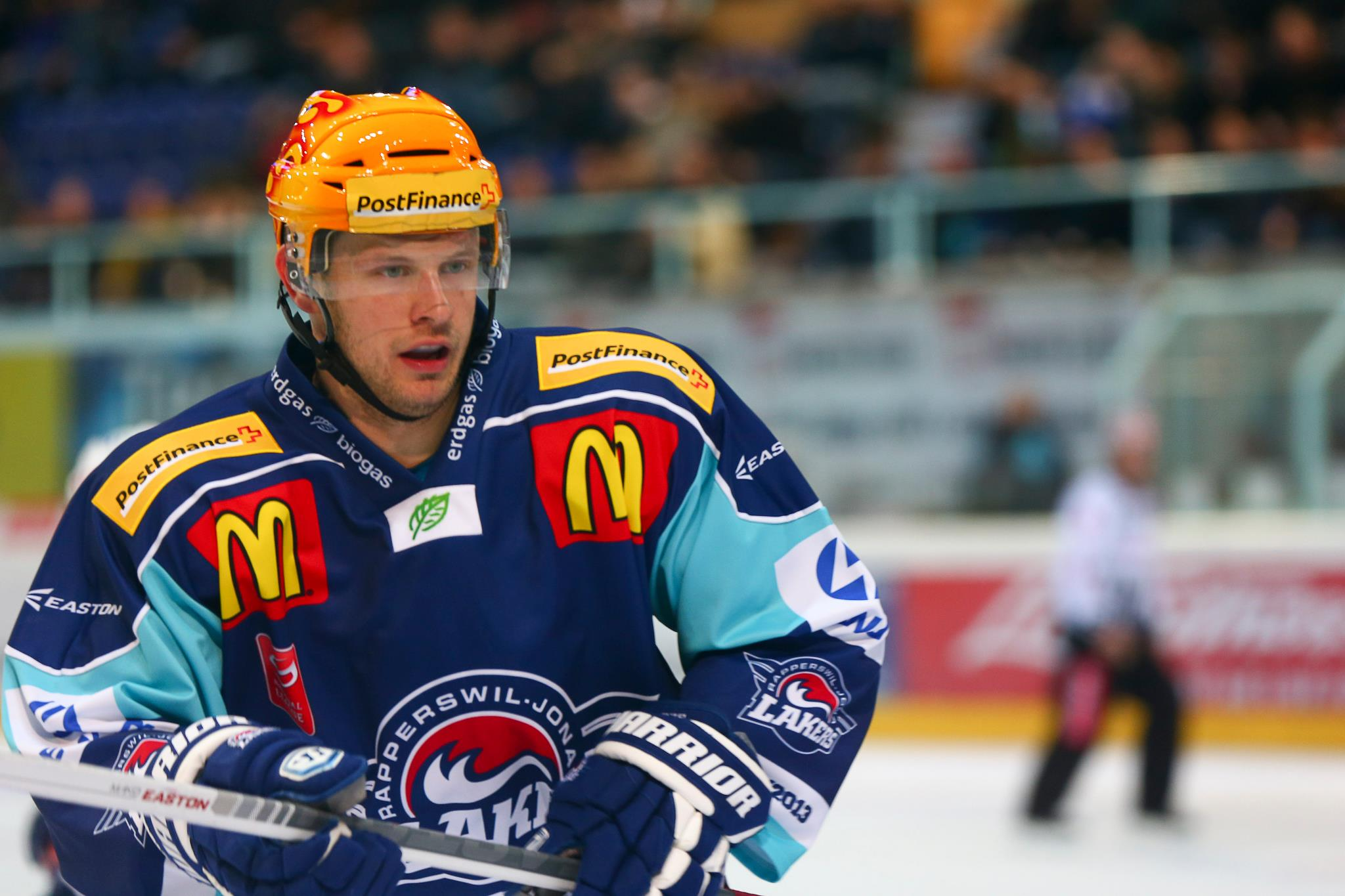
Spezza in December 2012. He played with the Rapperswil-Jona Lakers of the Swiss NLA during the 2012–13 NHL lockout.

Spezza spent time with Rapperswil-Jona Lakers of the Swiss National League A during the 2012–13 NHL lockout and returned to the Senators once a resolution had been negotiated. He registered two goals and three assists in five games before a back injury sidelined him. The Senators announced on January 31, 2013, that Spezza would be out of the Ottawa line-up for a minimum of two months (and possibly longer) as he required surgery for a herniated disc in his back. The injury occurred in a game against the Pittsburgh Penguins on January 27. Spezza ultimately missed the remainder of the regular season and the first round of the 2013 playoffs. He returned to action on May 19, 2013, for the third game of Ottawa's Eastern Conference Semi-final series against Pittsburgh.

On September 14, 2013, Spezza was named the eighth captain in Senators' franchise history, replacing long-time teammate Daniel Alfredsson, who joined the Detroit Red Wings as a free agent on July 5, 2013.

After the conclusion of his first season as the Senators captain in 2013–14, it was revealed by Senators general manager Bryan Murray that Spezza had requested a trade from the Senators. At the 2014 NHL entry draft, a potential trade to the Nashville Predators was negotiated by Murray but rejected by Spezza as the Predators were one of the teams listed in his limited contractual no-trade clause.

==== Dallas Stars (2014–2019) ====
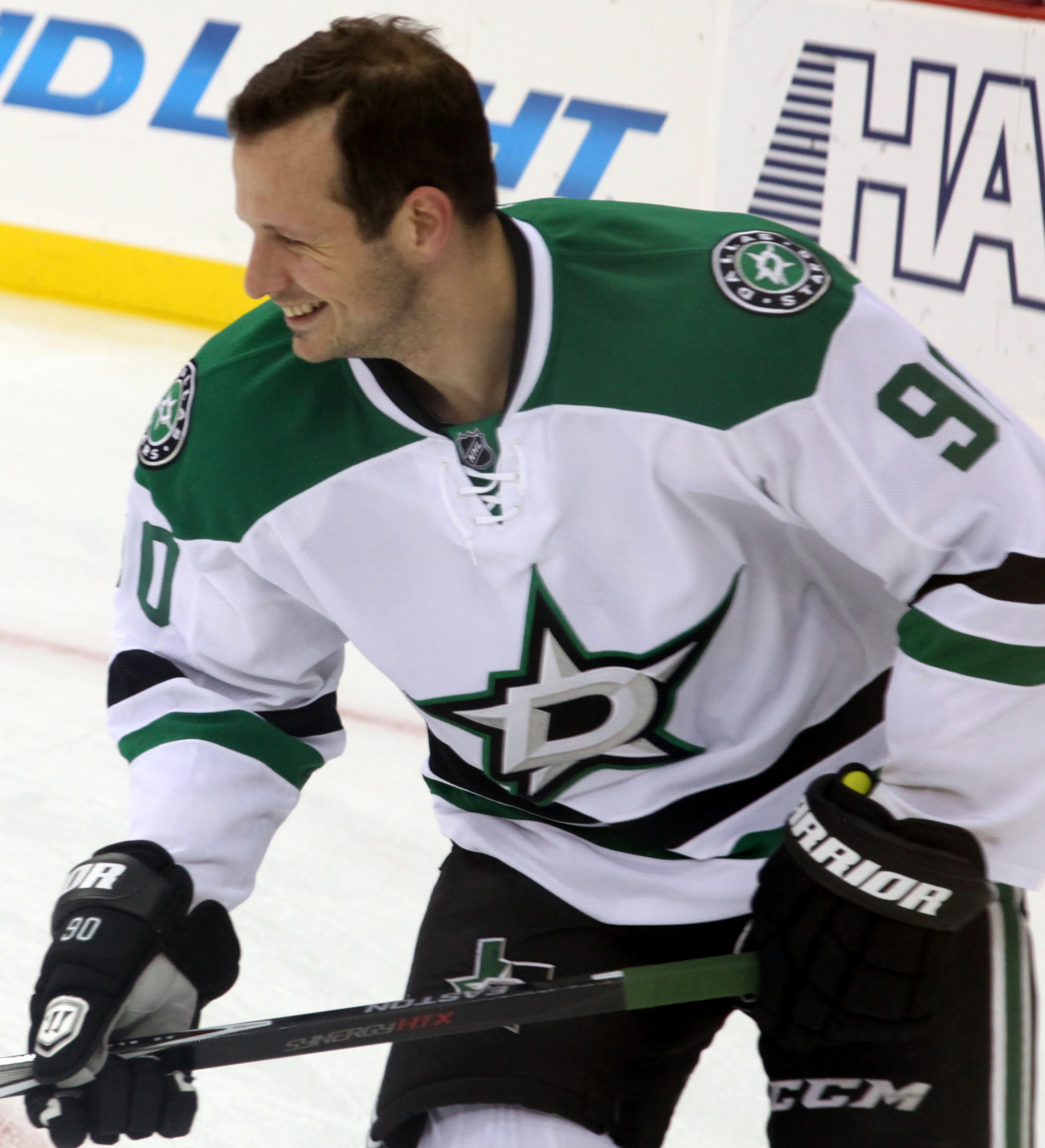
Spezza with the Dallas Stars in October 2014

On July 1, 2014, Spezza was traded to the Dallas Stars (along with Ludwig Karlsson) in exchange for Alex Chiasson, Alex Guptill, Nick Paul and a second-round pick in the 2015 NHL entry draft. On November 21, Spezza signed a four-year contract with Dallas (effective from the 2015–16 season through to the 2018–19 season) worth an annual average value of $7.5 million. He recorded 17 goals, 45 assists and 62 points in all 82 games in his first season with the Stars, as they missed the 2015 playoffs by seven points.

His offensive production improved the following season, scoring 33 goals, 30 assist and 63 points in 75 games as the Stars qualified for the 2016 playoffs as the top seed in the Western Conference. Spezza and the Stars would defeat the Minnesota Wild in six games in round 1 and then lose to the St. Louis Blues in seven games in the second round.

Spezza recorded 15 goals, 35 assists and 50 points in 68 games during the 2016–17 season as the Stats as a team would struggle with injuries to players across the roster and miss the playoffs by 15 points.

In 2017–18, Speeza played 78 games with eight goals and 18 assists and the Stars improved drastically as a team, missing the playoffs by just three points.

On October 30, 2018, in a 4–1 win over the Montreal Canadiens, Spezza played in his 1,000th career NHL game. He finished the 2018–19 season with eight goals, 18 assists and 27 points in 76 games and the Stars got back into a playoff spot for the first time in three years. In the 2019 playoffs he played 11 games with three goals and two assists for five points with Spezza upsetting the Nashville Predators in the first round in six games before getting defeated by the St. Louis Blues in the second round in seven games like 2016.

==== Toronto Maple Leafs (2019–2022) ====
On July 1, 2019, as a free agent, Spezza signed a one-year, $700,000 contract for the 2019–20 season with the Toronto Maple Leafs, the team he supported as a child. On signing, Spezza said, "Just to have a chance to put on a Leaf jersey is going to be pretty special for me." However, Spezza was scratched for Toronto's opening night game against his former team, the Ottawa Senators, in a highly criticized move by Toronto's head coach Mike Babcock. Spezza made his debut with the Maple Leafs in the following game on October 5, against the Columbus Blue Jackets.

On October 5, 2020, Spezza signed a one-year, $700,000 extension with the Maple Leafs.

On January 17, 2021, the Maple Leafs placed Spezza on waivers after 3 games for salary cap reasons. Spezza's agent indicated that Spezza would retire if claimed by another team. Ultimately, he went unclaimed and cleared waivers to remain with the Maple Leafs. Two and a half weeks later, Spezza would go on to record his eighth and final career hat trick in a 7–3 victory over the Vancouver Canucks on February 4.

On June 16, 2021, Spezza re-signed with the Maple Leafs to a one-year contract extension worth league minimum again, $750,000. Spezza's deal was seen as another hometown discount for the salary cap strapped club, stating "if I could take less, I would" to help the team win. Spezza continued his strong play in a depth role before being suspended six games on December 8 for a hit to the head of Winnipeg Jets defender Neal Pionk that occurred three days prior after Pionk injured teammate Rasmus Sandin with a knee-on-knee hit. Spezza, who had a reputation as a clean player that had never been suspended or fined once in his 19 seasons in the NHL appealed the decision, with NHL commissioner Gary Bettman reducing the suspension to four games on December 17. Following the Leafs' elimination in the first round of the 2022 Stanley Cup playoffs by the Tampa Bay Lightning, Spezza announced his retirement after 19 seasons in the NHL. Spezza retired with 995 career NHL points, the most of any player who never hit 1,000. The Maple Leafs offered him a new position as special assistant to general manager Kyle Dubas, which Spezza accepted, saying he was "very grateful to the Leafs for the amazing opportunity to transition into this new role. It enables me to continue to follow my passion; learn and live new experiences within the game I love." Spezza's loyalty to his hometown Maple Leafs factored into his decision, stating that he believed that it was best for the on-ice product for him to retire and open opportunity for young offensive players.

== International play ==
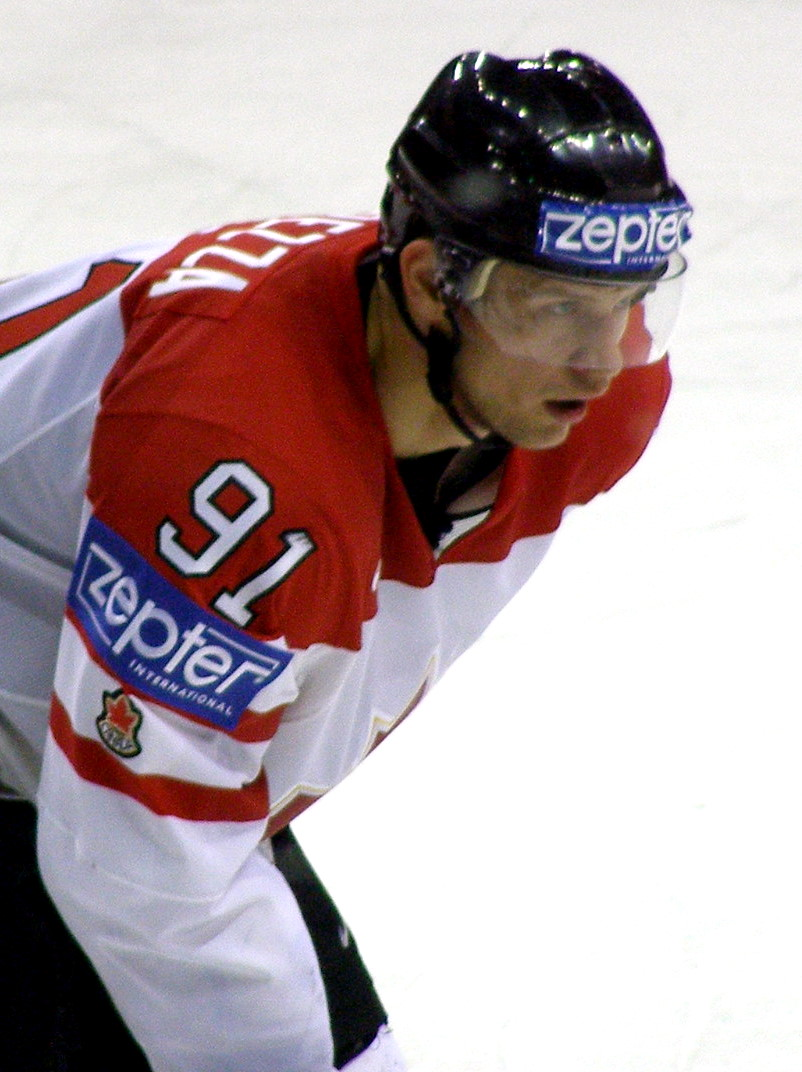
- Spezza at the 2008 World Championships

Medal record

Representing Canada

Ice hockey

World Championships
Gold medal – first place	2015 Czech Republic	
Silver medal – second place	2009 Switzerland	
Silver medal – second place	2008 Canada	

World Junior Championships
Silver medal – second place	2002 Czech Republic	
Bronze medal – third place	2001 Russia	
Bronze medal – third place	2000 Sweden	

Spengler Cup
Gold medal – first place	2012 Davos	

As a junior, Spezza represented Canada's national junior team three consecutive years. He made his debut at the 2000 World Junior Championships, becoming just the third 16-year-old to make the team in Team Canada history, after Wayne Gretzky and Eric Lindros (this feat was also accomplished the same year by defenceman Jay Bouwmeester and Sidney Crosby in 2004). Spezza contributed 2 assists in 7 games as Canada captured a bronze medal. He returned in 2001 for a second consecutive bronze medal, while improving to three goals and three assists. Spezza made it to the gold medal game with Canada in his third and final World Junior appearance in 2002, but lost to Russia to earn the silver.

As a member of the Senators, Spezza was made a reserve for Canada at the 2006 Winter Olympics in Turin, but did not play. He would make his men's debut for Canada at the 2008 World Championships, being named to the team along with Senators linemate Dany Heatley. He earned a silver medal, losing to Russia in the gold-medal game. With the Senators failing to make the NHL playoffs the following year, Spezza again represented Canada at the 2009 World Championships. He won another silver medal, losing to Russia in the gold medal game for the second consecutive year. Spezza, along with Finland's Niko Kapanen and fellow Canadian Steven Stamkos, finished the tournament tied for first in goals scored with seven.

Despite his success with the national team in the two previous World Championships, as well as being named a reserve for the 2006 Olympic team, Spezza was left off Canada's initial summer camp roster in preparation for the 2010 Winter Olympics in Vancouver. However, after veteran Joe Sakic announced his retirement and Ryan Getzlaf declared that he required more time to recover from injury, Spezza was invited to fill in one of the vacant spots.

As the 2012–13 NHL lockout continued, Spezza was named to Canada's roster for the 2012 Spengler Cup held in Davos, Switzerland. Spezza joined fellow NHL stars John Tavares, Tyler Seguin, Patrice Bergeron, Ryan Smyth, and Matt Duchene in the Canadian line-up, helping Canada defeat host team HC Davos to capture its first Spengler Cup title since 2007.

At the 2015 World Championships, where Canada won the gold medal for the first time since 2007 with a perfect 10–0 record, Spezza was named best forward and a member of the all-star team; he was the tournament's leading scorer.

== Executive career ==
For the 2022–23 Toronto Maple Leafs season, Spezza was hired as special assistant to the general manager, Kyle Dubas. Spezza resigned from his position with the Maple Leafs on May 19, 2023, following Leafs president Brendan Shanahan's decision to remove Dubas as general manager.

Shortly afterward, Dubas was hired by the Pittsburgh Penguins as president of hockey operations. On June 14, 2023, Spezza joined that organization as an assistant general manager.

== Off the ice ==
=== Community programs ===
Spezza participates in numerous activities outside of hockey, especially the "Spelling with Spezza" program. Winners received a poster of Spezza and a pair of tickets to an Ottawa Senators' home game. The program recognizes the importance of spelling. Spezza visited selected classes registered for the program. In his last season with the Senators, over 600 classes in the Ottawa-Gatineau area participated in Spelling with Spezza. He also contributes to Ronald McDonald House Charities.

=== Personal life ===
Spezza wed his girlfriend, Jennifer Snell, in Ottawa on July 25, 2009. The ceremony took place at Notre Dame Cathedral Basilica and the reception was held across the street at the National Gallery of Canada. Many of his then-current and past teammates were in attendance, including Ray Emery, Antoine Vermette, Brendan Bell, Chris Phillips and Chris Neil, as well as Senators owner Eugene Melnyk.

The couple have four daughters. Spezza and his family resided in the west-end of Ottawa during his tenure with the Senators, but sold the home when he was traded to Dallas.

Spezza's younger brother Matthew was a goaltender who last played for the Flint Generals of the International Hockey League (IHL). He died of an accidental drug overdose in 2024 at the age of 37.

=== Endorsements ===
Spezza was on the cover of the NHL 2K8 video game for the PlayStation 2, PlayStation 3, Xbox and the Xbox 360 video game consoles.

== Career statistics ==
=== Regular season and playoffs ===
Bold indicates led league

			Regular season					Playoffs
Season	Team	League	GP	G	A	Pts	PIM	GP	G	A	Pts	PIM
1998–99	Brampton Battalion	OHL	67	22	49	71	18	—	—	—	—	—
1999–00	Mississauga IceDogs	OHL	52	24	37	61	33	—	—	—	—	—
2000–01	Mississauga IceDogs	OHL	15	7	23	30	11	—	—	—	—	—
2000–01	Windsor Spitfires	OHL	41	36	50	86	32	9	4	5	9	10
2001–02	Windsor Spitfires	OHL	27	19	26	45	16	—	—	—	—	—
2001–02	Belleville Bulls	OHL	26	23	37	60	26	11	5	6	11	18
2001–02	Grand Rapids Griffins	AHL	—	—	—	—	—	3	1	0	1	2
2002–03	Binghamton Senators	AHL	43	22	32	54	71	2	1	2	3	4
2002–03	Ottawa Senators	NHL	33	7	14	21	8	3	1	1	2	0
2003–04	Ottawa Senators	NHL	78	22	33	55	71	3	0	0	0	2
2004–05	Binghamton Senators	AHL	80	32	**85**	**117**	50	6	1	3	4	6
2005–06	Ottawa Senators	NHL	68	19	71	90	33	10	5	9	14	2
2006–07	Ottawa Senators	NHL	67	34	53	87	45	20	7	**15**	**22**	10
2007–08	Ottawa Senators	NHL	76	34	58	92	66	4	0	1	1	0
2008–09	Ottawa Senators	NHL	82	32	41	73	79	—	—	—	—	—
2009–10	Ottawa Senators	NHL	60	23	34	57	20	6	1	6	7	4
2010–11	Ottawa Senators	NHL	62	21	36	57	28	—	—	—	—	—
2011–12	Ottawa Senators	NHL	80	34	50	84	36	7	3	2	5	8
2012–13	Rapperswil–Jona Lakers	NLA	28	9	21	30	12	—	—	—	—	—
2012–13	Ottawa Senators	NHL	5	2	3	5	2	3	0	1	1	0
2013–14	Ottawa Senators	NHL	75	23	43	66	46	—	—	—	—	—
2014–15	Dallas Stars	NHL	82	17	45	62	28	—	—	—	—	—
2015–16	Dallas Stars	NHL	75	33	30	63	22	13	5	8	13	2
2016–17	Dallas Stars	NHL	68	15	35	50	29	—	—	—	—	—
2017–18	Dallas Stars	NHL	78	8	18	26	12	—	—	—	—	—
2018–19	Dallas Stars	NHL	76	8	19	27	29	11	3	2	5	0
2019–20	Toronto Maple Leafs	NHL	58	9	16	25	18	5	0	0	0	9
2020–21	Toronto Maple Leafs	NHL	54	10	20	30	6	7	3	2	5	4
2021–22	Toronto Maple Leafs	NHL	71	12	13	25	26	5	0	1	1	2
NHL totals			1,248	363	632	995	604	97	28	48	76	43

=== International ===
Year	Team	Event	Results	GP	G	A	Pts	PIM
2000	Canada	WJC	3rd place, bronze medalist(s)	7	0	2	2	2
2001	Canada	WJC	3rd place, bronze medalist(s)	7	3	3	6	2
2002	Canada	WJC	2nd place, silver medalist(s)	7	0	4	4	8
2008	Canada	WC	2nd place, silver medalist(s)	9	1	2	3	0
2009	Canada	WC	2nd place, silver medalist(s)	9	7	4	11	2
2011	Canada	WC	5th	7	4	3	7	4
2015	Canada	WC	1st place, gold medalist(s)	10	6	8	14	2
Junior totals				21	3	9	12	12
Senior totals				35	18	17	35	8

== Awards and honours ==
Award	Year
OHL
First All-Rookie Team	1999
Third All-Star Team	2001, 2002
CHL/NHL Top Prospects Game	2001
CHL Top Draft Prospect Award	2001
AHL
All-Rookie Team	2003
All-Star Game	2003, 2005
First All-Star Team	2005
Les Cunningham Award	2005
John B. Sollenberger Trophy	2005
NHL
All-Star Game	2008, 2012
International
WC All-Star Team	2015
WC Best Forward	2015

Awards and achievements
Preceded by Jay Harrison	Jack Ferguson Award; 1999	Succeeded by Patrick Jarrett
Preceded by Anton Volchenkov	Ottawa Senators first-round draft pick 2001	Succeeded by Tim Gleason
Preceded by Jason LaBarbera	Les Cunningham Award winner 2005	Succeeded by Donald MacLean
Preceded by Pavel Rosa	John B. Sollenberger Trophy winner 2005	Succeeded by Kirby Law
Preceded by Daniel Alfredsson	Ottawa Senators captain 2013–14	Succeeded by Erik Karlsson
