= Daniel Alfredsson =

Swedish ice hockey player (born 1972)

Daniel Alfredsson MSC
- Hockey Hall of Fame, 2022
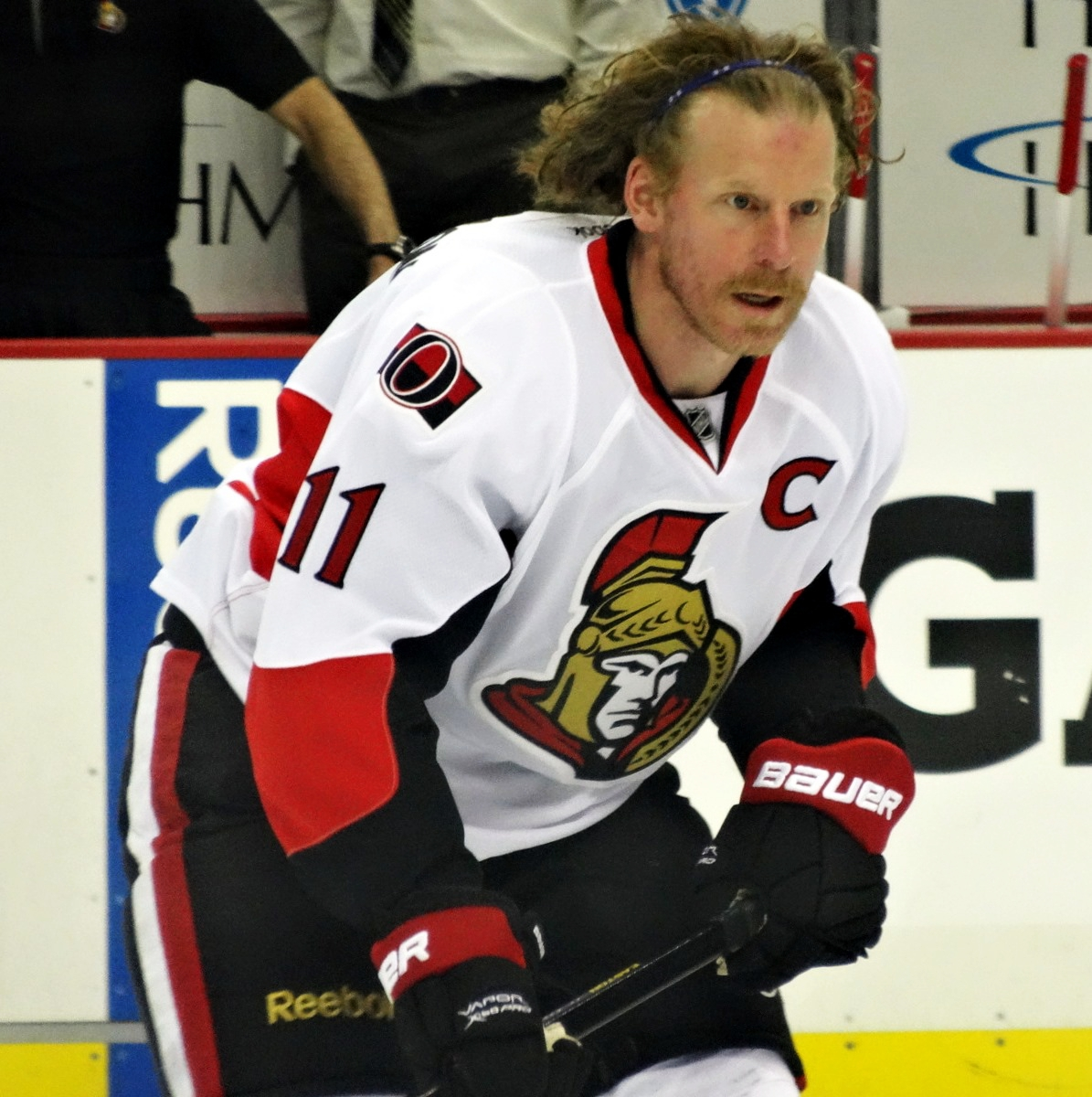
- Alfredsson with the Ottawa Senators in 2013
- Born: 11 December 1972 (age 53) Gothenburg, Sweden
- Height: 5 ft 11 in (180 cm)
- Weight: 203 lb (92 kg; 14 st 7 lb)
- Position: Right wing
- Shot: Right
- Played for: Frölunda HC; Ottawa Senators; Detroit Red Wings
- National team: Sweden
- NHL draft: 133rd overall, 1994; Ottawa Senators
- Playing career: 1992–2014

Daniel Alfredsson MSC (pronounced [ˈdɑ̂ːnɪɛl ˈâlfrɛdˌsɔn]; born 11 December 1972), nicknamed "Alfie", is a Swedish-Canadian former professional ice hockey player and associate coach for the Toronto Maple Leafs. He spent 18 seasons in the National Hockey League (NHL), primarily with the Senators. He also briefly played for the Detroit Red Wings before his retirement in 2014.

Alfredsson was captain of the Senators, serving from 1999 to 2013. With the Senators, Alfredsson usually played on the first line, which was formerly nicknamed the "CASH" or "Pizza" line with centre Jason Spezza and left winger Dany Heatley, before Heatley's trade to the San Jose Sharks. He had traditionally been the fourth forward on the ice in the role of pointman on Ottawa's power play unit. One of the league's top two-way players, he holds the Senators' franchise records for goals (426), assists (682) and points (1,108) with 1,178 games played. He had played for Sweden internationally 14 times, including the 2006 gold medal and 2014 silver medal-winning Olympic teams. He was the 75th player to reach 1,000 career points in the NHL, doing so after scoring three goals in a win over the Buffalo Sabres on 22 October 2010.

Alfredsson holds an Honorary Degree from Carleton University and was inducted into the Hockey Hall of Fame in 2022. He was inducted into the IIHF Hall of Fame in 2018.

== Playing career ==
=== Ottawa Senators (1994–2013) ===
Drafted 133rd overall in the sixth round of the 1994 NHL entry draft, Alfredsson was a serendipitous pick by the Ottawa Senators. He had been overlooked by many NHL scouts, but one man in Ottawa's front office, John Ferguson, saw the potential and pushed management for his selection. Though largely unheralded entering his first NHL training camp, he would go on to win the Calder Memorial Trophy as rookie of the year in his first NHL season in 1995–96 and was the Senators' representative at the 1996 NHL All-Star Game. In 1996–97, he improved on his rookie totals and played in the All-Star Game again. He finished second in team scoring, contributing to the Senators' first modern qualification to the Stanley Cup playoffs.

Alfredsson missed the beginning of the 1997–98 season due to a contract dispute. On 24 August 1997, he demanded a trade from the Senators after the five-year contract offered to him was worth $1 million less annually than that teammate Alexei Yashin received per season. Alfredsson eventually signed a new contract on 12 October worth $14 million over four years. After missing the first five games of the season, he was greeted by a standing ovation in his first game back in Ottawa. Alfredsson would later be named the Senators' representative at the All-Star Game for the third consecutive season. During that season, Alfredsson would play in only 55 games, due to the earlier contract dispute and a late season ankle injury. The Senators qualified for the playoffs again and defeated the New Jersey Devils, but lost to the surging Washington Capitals in the second round; Alfredsson scored 7 goals in 11 playoff games.

In the 1998–99 season, Alfredsson missed 24 games due to an injury and was limited to only 11 goals. The club once again qualified for the playoffs, and Alfredsson hoped to have a good post-season, but was limited to one goal and three points in a sweep at the hands of the Buffalo Sabres. The next season, he was named captain of the Senators after Alexei Yashin was stripped of the captaincy for refusing to honour his contract. After two somewhat disappointing seasons, Alfredsson's scoring totals improved, with 21 goals and 59 points in 57 games. In the 2000 playoffs, the Senators met the Toronto Maple Leafs in the Eastern Conference Quarterfinals. The Senators would lose the inaugural "Battle of Ontario", although Alfredsson contributed three goals in the six-game series.

In 2000–01, Alexei Yashin returned to the Ottawa lineup but the team captaincy remained with Alfredsson, who would score 24 goals and 70 points in 68 games. The Senators again met the Maple Leafs in the first round of the 2001 playoffs, and Alfredsson was limited to one goal in a four-game series sweep by Toronto. In 2001–02, Alfredsson set a personal best with 37 goals and 71 points in 78 games. In the 2002 playoffs, the Senators once again met the now arch-rival Maple Leafs in the second round, where they lost in seven games. Alfredsson led the team in playoff scoring with 7 goals and 13 points in 12 games.

Alfredsson signed a new two-year contract prior to the 2002–03 season. He increased his scoring totals, finishing with 27 goals and 78 points. The club won the Presidents' Trophy that season as the NHL's top regular season team, despite the organization filing for bankruptcy protection, and qualified for the Eastern Conference Finals before losing to the eventual Stanley Cup champion New Jersey Devils. Alfredsson scored 4 goals and 8 points in 18 games.

In 2003–04, Alfredsson finished the season with 32 goals and 80 points in 78 games. The club lost in the first round of the 2004 playoffs to Toronto, and Alfredsson was limited to one goal and three points in the seven-game series. Mid-season, Alfredsson signed a new five-year contract with the Senators.

Like many NHL players, Alfredsson played for a European team during the 2004–05 NHL lockout. He returned to Sweden to play for Frölunda HC, the team he had played for prior to beginning his NHL career. He played on an all-NHL line with P. J. Axelsson and Samuel Påhlsson, helping the club win the Swedish championship. Alfredsson was a major contributor during the playoffs, scoring 12 goals and 18 points in 13 games.

On 5 October 2005, the opening night of the 2005–06 NHL season, the Senators played the Maple Leafs, with the newly acquired Dany Heatley playing on the top line with Jason Spezza and Brandon Bochenski. The Senators were down by a goal with five minutes remaining in the third period, when Alfredsson, replacing Bochenski on the top line, scored the tying goal. This line combination would remain intact and became known as the "CASH line". Later in the same game, Heatley and Alfredsson scored the first goals in a regular season NHL shootout when they scored against Maple Leafs goaltender Ed Belfour for a 3–2 victory. With Alfredsson scoring in the shootout, he became the first captain in the NHL history to do so. Alfredsson and Heatley's sticks were subsequently sent to the Hockey Hall of Fame.

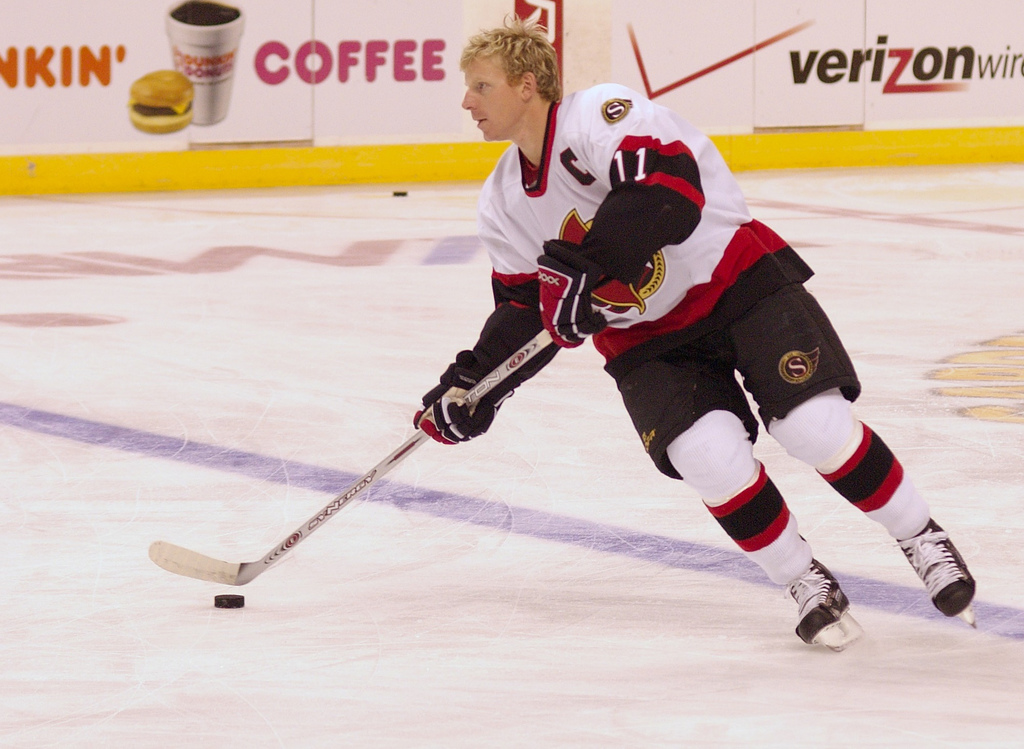
Daniel Alfredsson carries the puck up the ice during a pre-game warmup in October 2006

Alfredsson capped off the 2005–06 regular season with a career-high 103 points (43 goals and 60 assists) tied for first on the Senators alongside Heatley. Perhaps the best game of his NHL career took place on 3 November 2005 against the longtime rival Buffalo Sabres, in which he scored a then career-high four goals and six points. After a disappointing 2006 playoffs, Alfredsson became the subject of trade rumours from the beginning of the 2006–07 season.

Because of his poor play to start the 2006–07 season, Alfredsson considered retirement in November 2006. However, after switching to using teammate Chris Kelly's used skates, his performance improved, scoring in the next four games, and ending the season with 29 goals and 58 assists. Alfredsson, notably picky about his skates, would continue to use Kelly's freshly broken-in skates until the latter was traded to the Boston Bruins in 2011.

On 23 December 2006, against the Philadelphia Flyers, Alfredsson scored his 600th career point, scoring two goals and adding an assist. In the 2007 playoffs, Alfredsson was the Senators' leading scorer with 14 goals and 22 points in 20 games. His leadership and strong play helped the Senators as they advanced past the Pittsburgh Penguins, the New Jersey Devils and the Buffalo Sabres, to reach the Stanley Cup Final for the first time in modern franchise history. He became the first European-born-and-raised captain to lead his team to the Stanley Cup finals. When presented with the Prince of Wales Trophy, he touched the trophy while posing with it, which many hockey players consider a form of bad luck.

Alfredsson was arguably Ottawa's best player in the 2007 Stanley Cup Final, which the Senators ultimately lost to the Anaheim Ducks in a five-game series. In a controversial incident in game four, an Alfredsson slap shot hit Ducks captain Scott Niedermayer at the end of the second period, leading to speculation that Alfredsson intended to injure Niedermayer. Alfredsson dismissed the notion, saying that he had glanced up at the clock to see if he had time to move in for a better shot, and then quickly fired in the heat of an important game.

Along with the rest of the Senators, Alfredsson's 2007–08 season was marked by highs and lows. On 24 January 2008, he scored three goals and four assists in an 8–4 victory over the Tampa Bay Lightning, setting the Senators' record for most points in one game. It vaulted him into the NHL scoring lead at the All-Star break. He was named NHL Player of the Week and the week's First Star. Alfredsson and his linemates, Heatley and Spezza, were named to the Eastern Conference All-Star Game roster, although Heatley would not play due to injury. Injuries reduced Alfredsson's playing time and effectiveness in the latter half of the season. First, Alfredsson suffered a hip pointer injury, and on 3 April 2008, Mark Bell of the Maple Leafs hit him with a shoulder that left Alfredsson on the ice, unable to get up for several minutes. He missed the final game of the regular season and the beginning of the 2008 playoffs; he had played in every modern Senators playoff game up to that point. On 14 April 2008, with the Senators trailing 2–0 in their playoff series to the Pittsburgh Penguins, Alfredsson made his return in game three of the series, four weeks earlier than initially expected. He was welcomed with a lengthy standing ovation at Scotiabank Place. However, the Senators gave up four unanswered goals (three in the third period) to lose the game 4–1. The Senators lost game four 3–1. Afterwards, in an interview on CBC, he admitted that he had been playing with a ruptured medial collateral ligament (MCL).

In October 2008, Alfredsson underwent arthroscopic surgery on his right knee to remove a bone chip and returned less than a week later. On 30 October 2008, Alfredsson signed a new four-year contract with Ottawa worth US$21.6 million. The contract, intended to allow Alfredsson to finish his playing career with the Senators, included a no-movement clause.

The 2008–09 season was a disappointing one for both Alfredsson and the Senators. The team failed to make the 2009 playoffs, and Alfredsson registered only 24 goals and 74 points in 79 games. On 8 July 2009, Alfredsson became the longest-serving active captain in the NHL, as former Montreal Canadiens captain Saku Koivu signed with the Anaheim Ducks and former Colorado Avalanche captain Joe Sakic announced his retirement.

The 2009–10 season saw Alfredsson's point total dip again as he scored only 20 goals and had 71 points in 70 games. On 6 April, Alfredsson reached an important milestone, playing in his 1,000th regular season NHL game. Even though the Senators lost to Pittsburgh in the first round of the 2010 playoffs, Alfredsson still scored two goals and added six assists to lead the team in scoring (tied with Matt Cullen). He later admitted that he had been bothered by a sports hernia since February, which could explain his reduced effectiveness in the last weeks of the season and the playoffs.

During the 2010–11 season, Alfredsson recorded his 1,000th career NHL point in a victory over the Buffalo Sabres on 22 October 2010.

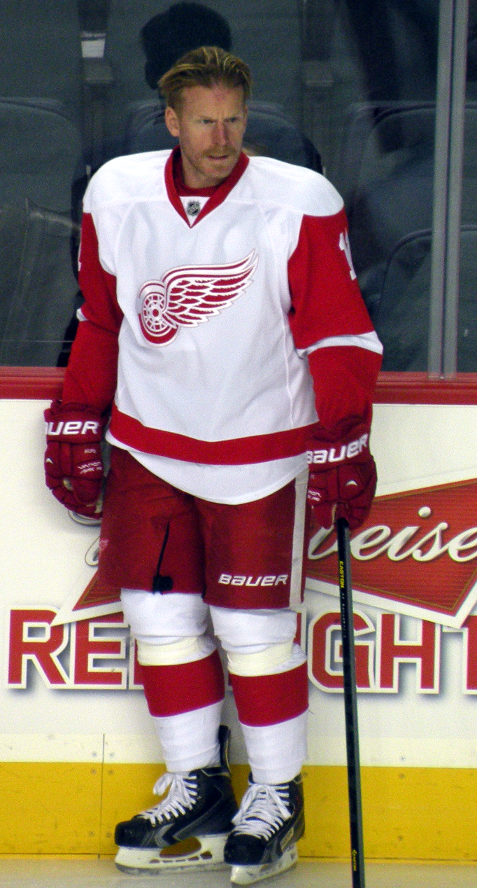
Alfredsson in November 2013 with the Detroit Red Wings

At season's end, Alfredsson underwent back surgery and was released from hospital the same day. At a 14 June 2011 news conference introducing new Senators' head coach Paul MacLean, Alfredsson stated that the surgery went well and that he was moving around fine.

Alfredsson began the 2011–12 season healthy, but was diagnosed with a concussion for the first time in his career after receiving a blow to the head from New York Rangers forward Wojtek Wolski on 29 October 2011. He returned on 11 November after missing five games, in a game against the Buffalo Sabres. On 30 December 2011, against the Calgary Flames, Alfredsson scored his 400th career goal, the game winner in overtime. Alfredsson was chosen to represent the Senators again at the 2012 NHL All-Star Game held at Scotiabank Place in Ottawa. Alfredsson was captain of "Team Alfredsson", scoring twice within one minute and 31 seconds in a 12–9 loss to "Team Chara". Widely assumed to be a candidate to be moved to a Stanley Cup contender at the 2012 NHL trade deadline, Ottawa's strong play resulted in Alfredsson not being placed on the trade market. "I was just really happy we didn't have to make that decision", said Alfredsson of the possibility of leaving Ottawa. In the first round of the 2012 playoffs, Alfredsson and the Senators were eliminated by the first-place New York Rangers in seven games. Speculation was rampant during early summer of 2012 that Alfredsson would announce his retirement, but on 31 July, he confirmed that he would be returning for his 17th season with the Senators.

The lockout-shortened 2012–13 season was a successful one for Alfredsson and the Senators. The team made the 2013 playoffs despite losing several key players to injury for extended periods, and defeated the rival Montreal Canadiens in the first round. Alfredsson was third in team scoring during the regular season with 10 goals and 16 assists in 47 games, and he led the Senators in scoring through the playoffs with 4 goals and 10 points in 10 games. At season's end, there was again speculation that Alfredsson might announce his retirement. On 28 June 2013, Senators general manager Bryan Murray confirmed that he had been informed by agent J. P. Barry that Alfredsson "is committed to play next year for the Senators". While Alfredsson negotiated a new contract with Ottawa, Boston Bruins' general manager Peter Chiarelli reached out to him in an attempt to gauge his interest in signing with Boston as the Bruins had just lost to the Presidents' Trophy-winning Chicago Blackhawks in six games in the 2013 Stanley Cup Final. Chiarelli attempted to convince Alfredsson that Boston could be a good destination for an older player looking to win a Stanley Cup prior to retirement.

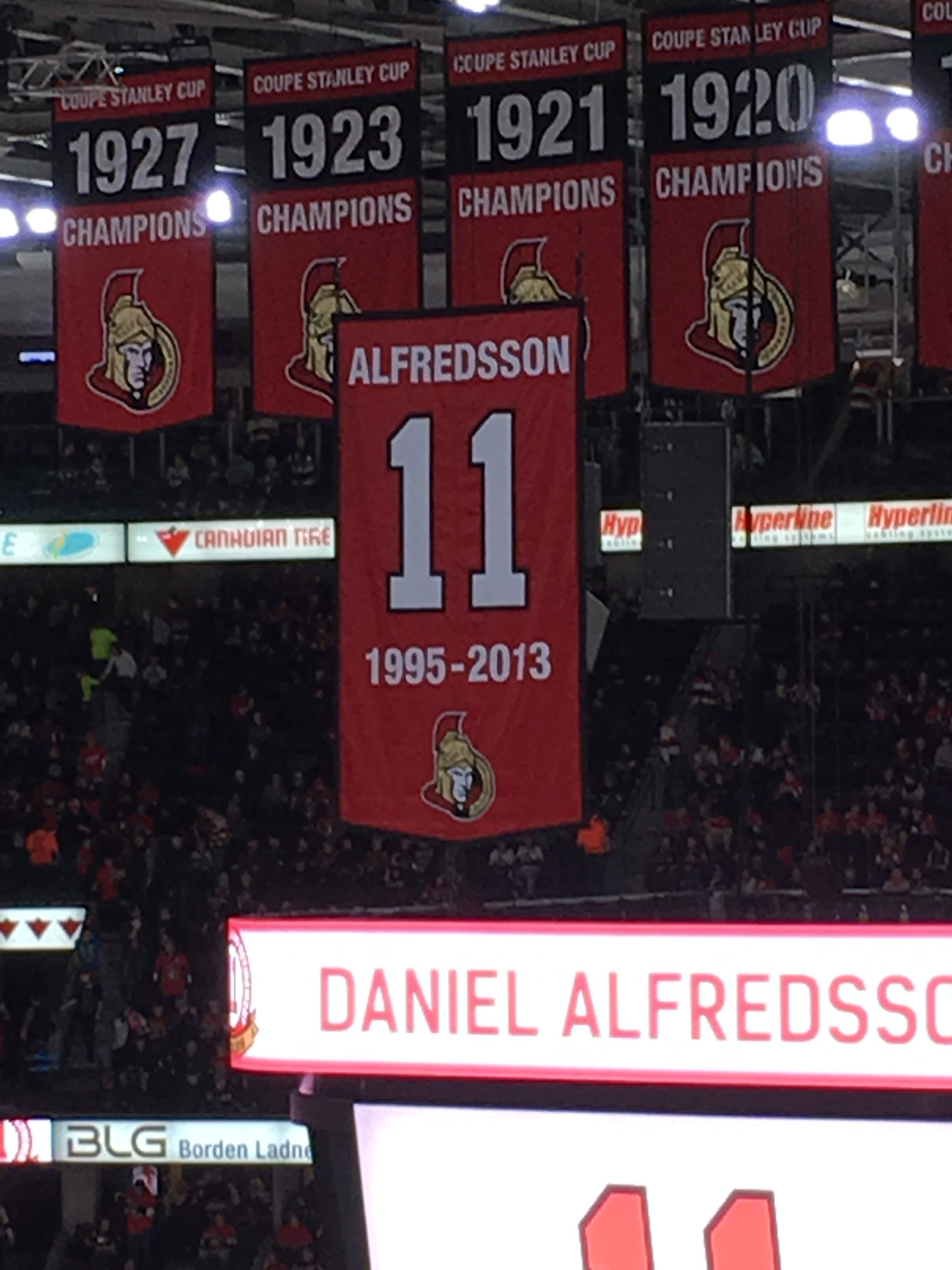
Daniel Alfredsson's Jersey Retirement Banner

=== Detroit Red Wings (2013–2014) ===
On 5 July 2013, after 17 seasons with the Senators, Alfredsson signed a one-year, $5.5 million contract with the Detroit Red Wings. Alfredsson's Ottawa teammates were taken aback by the news. Alfredsson phoned Chris Phillips so that he would not hear the news at the same time as everyone else; Phillips said he was shocked. Marc Methot said many teammates were caught off guard. "We all were pretty adamant that he was going to return because he is grounded in this city (Ottawa) and so well-loved that everyone figured something would work out", said Methot. Ex–Senators head coach Jacques Martin, at the time a hockey analyst on TVA Sports, compared Alfredsson's departure to Ray Bourque's decision to move to the Colorado Avalanche from the Boston Bruins to win a Stanley Cup. Alfredsson confirmed a day later that his decision to leave Ottawa was motivated by a desire to win a Stanley Cup prior to retirement. "I had not won a Stanley Cup and that's a big priority for me," Alfredsson said. He later explained that his departure from Ottawa was due to a contract impasse, though Senators' general manager Bryan Murray had expected Alfredsson to remain in Ottawa. Alfredsson returned to Ottawa for the first time with the Red Wings on 1 December 2013, and was greeted with a video tribute and loud cheers from the home crowd. He also scored an empty net goal in the Red Wings victory.

The 41-year-old recorded 18 goals and 49 points during his only season with the Red Wings during the 2013–14 season, tying for the team lead in scoring. Back problems kept Alfredsson from attending training camp and starting the 2014–15 season. On 27 November 2014, Alfredsson announced to Swedish press that he had retired as a player.

=== Retirement ===
On 4 December 2014, Alfredsson signed a one-day contract to officially retire as a member of the Ottawa Senators. Alfredsson took part in the pre-game warm-ups and took the ceremonial face-off as the Senators faced the New York Islanders, a game the Senators lost 2–1.

During Alfredsson's career with the Senators, he played in 1,178 games, had 426 goals, 682 assists and 1,108 points, all franchise records. Chris Phillips broke Alfredsson's games-played record two months later. On 29 December 2016, Alfredsson became the first player of the current Senators franchise to have his jersey number retired.

== International play ==
Medal record

Representing Sweden

Men's ice hockey

Olympic Games
Gold medal – first place	2006 Turin	
Silver medal – second place	2014 Sochi	

World Championships
Silver medal – second place	1995 Stockholm	
Silver medal – second place	2004 Prague/Ostrava	
Bronze medal – third place	1999 Oslo/Hamar	
Bronze medal – third place	2001 Cologne/Hanover	

Alfredsson has participated in 14 international tournaments for Sweden:

- 1995 World Championships (silver medal)
- 1996 World Championships
- 1996 World Cup of Hockey
- 1998 Winter Olympics
- 1999 World Championships (bronze medal)
- 2001 World Championships (bronze medal)
- 2002 Winter Olympics
- 2004 World Championships (silver medal)
- 2004 World Cup of Hockey
- 2005 World Championships
- 2006 Winter Olympics (alternate captain, gold medal)
- 2010 Winter Olympics (alternate captain)
- 2012 World Championships (captain)
- 2014 Winter Olympics (alternate captain, silver medal)

At the 2006 Olympics, Alfredsson set personal highs in goals (5), assists (5) and points (10) and played on the second line with Mats Sundin and Henrik Zetterberg. After an injury to Peter Forsberg, Alfredsson took Forsberg's spot as the alternate captain, along with Captain Sundin and defenceman Nicklas Lidström. Alfredsson was named captain of Sweden for the first time at the 2012 IIHF World Championship.

== Post-playing career ==
=== Hockey operations career ===
After retiring as a player, Alfredsson joined the Ottawa Senators as senior advisor of hockey operations. Alfredsson and the Senators did not agree to a new contract in July 2017.

=== Coaching career ===
==== Ottawa Senators (2023–2026) ====
On 13 October 2023, it was announced that Alfredsson had re-joined the Ottawa Senators organization in a player development coaching role. On 18 December 2023, the Ottawa Senators relieved head coach D. J. Smith of his duties and announced the appointment of Jacques Martin as head coach, and Alfredsson as assistant coach. Alfredsson made his coaching debut in a game on 19 December against the Arizona Coyotes. After interim coach Martin was replaced by the new permanent head coach, Travis Green, it was announced that Alfredsson would remain as part of Green's staff.

==== Toronto Maple Leafs (2026–present) ====
On 7 July 2026, the Toronto Maple Leafs announced that Alfredsson would be joining Jim Hiller's coaching staff as associate coach.

== Personal life ==
Alfredsson married long-time girlfriend Birgitta (née Backman) on 31 July 2004. They are the parents of four sons. The family resides in Ottawa and Särö, Sweden. Alfredsson's parents are Hasse and Margareta Alfredsson.

Alfredsson's younger brother Henric Alfredsson played with the Ontario Hockey League's Ottawa 67's as a 19-year-old during their 1999 Memorial Cup-winning season. Henric decided to stay in Ottawa after his junior hockey career with the 67's was complete and worked for the Ottawa Police Service.

On 5 March 2015, Alfredsson was presented with the key to the city by Ottawa Deputy Mayor Bob Monette; Mayor Jim Watson was recuperating from a broken pelvis suffered in a snowmobiling accident and was unavailable. The key to the city is the city's highest honour, reserved only for the people who make the greatest impact on Ottawa residents. The honour was in recognition not only of Alfredsson's accomplishments with the Senators, but also for his off-ice leadership and advocacy with the Ottawa Senators Foundation, the Royal Ottawa Foundation for Mental Health and the Boys and Girls Club of Ottawa.

Alfredsson became a Canadian citizen at a special ceremony at the 2016 World Cup of Hockey on 20 September 2016.

== Career statistics ==
=== Regular season and playoffs ===
Bold indicates led league

			Regular season					Playoffs
Season	Team	League	GP	G	A	Pts	PIM	GP	G	A	Pts	PIM
1990–91	Mölndals IF	Swe-2	3	0	0	0	2	8	4	4	8	4
1991–92	Mölndals IF	Swe-2	32	12	8	20	43	—	—	—	—	—
1992–93	Frölunda HC	SEL	21	1	5	6	8	—	—	—	—	—
1993–94	Frölunda HC	SEL	39	20	10	30	18	4	1	1	2	8
1994–95	Frölunda HC	SEL	22	7	11	18	22	—	—	—	—	—
1995–96	Ottawa Senators	NHL	82	26	35	61	28	—	—	—	—	—
1996–97	Ottawa Senators	NHL	76	24	47	71	30	7	5	2	7	6
1997–98	Ottawa Senators	NHL	55	17	28	45	18	11	7	2	9	20
1998–99	Ottawa Senators	NHL	58	11	22	33	14	4	1	2	3	4
1999–2000	Ottawa Senators	NHL	57	21	38	59	28	6	1	3	4	2
2000–01	Ottawa Senators	NHL	68	24	46	70	30	4	1	0	1	2
2001–02	Ottawa Senators	NHL	78	37	34	71	45	12	7	6	13	4
2002–03	Ottawa Senators	NHL	78	27	51	78	42	18	4	4	8	12
2003–04	Ottawa Senators	NHL	77	32	48	80	24	7	1	2	3	2
2004–05	Frölunda HC	SEL	15	8	9	17	10	14	12	6	18	8
2005–06	Ottawa Senators	NHL	77	43	60	103	50	10	2	8	10	4
2006–07	Ottawa Senators	NHL	77	29	58	87	42	20	**14**	8	**22**	10
2007–08	Ottawa Senators	NHL	70	40	49	89	34	2	0	0	0	0
2008–09	Ottawa Senators	NHL	79	24	50	74	24	—	—	—	—	—
2009–10	Ottawa Senators	NHL	70	20	51	71	22	6	2	6	8	2
2010–11	Ottawa Senators	NHL	54	14	17	31	18	—	—	—	—	—
2011–12	Ottawa Senators	NHL	75	27	32	59	18	4	2	0	2	0
2012–13	Ottawa Senators	NHL	47	10	16	26	33	10	4	6	10	6
2013–14	Detroit Red Wings	NHL	68	18	31	49	10	3	0	0	0	2
SEL totals			97	36	35	71	58	18	13	7	20	16
NHL totals			1,246	444	713	1,157	510	124	51	49	100	76

=== International ===
Year	Team	Event	Result	GP	G	A	Pts	PIM
1995	Sweden	WC	2nd place, silver medalist(s)	8	3	1	4	4
1996	Sweden	WCH	3rd place, bronze medalist(s)	4	0	0	0	2
1996	Sweden	WC	6th	6	1	2	3	4
1998	Sweden	Oly	5th	4	2	3	5	2
1999	Sweden	WC	3rd place, bronze medalist(s)	10	4	5	9	8
2001	Sweden	WC	3rd place, bronze medalist(s)	9	3	5	8	8
2002	Sweden	Oly	5th	4	1	4	5	2
2004	Sweden	WCH	5th	4	0	6	6	2
2004	Sweden	WC	2nd place, silver medalist(s)	8	4	2	6	8
2005	Sweden	WC	4th	9	3	6	9	6
2006	Sweden	Oly	1st place, gold medalist(s)	8	5	5	10	2
2010	Sweden	Oly	5th	4	3	0	3	0
2012	Sweden	WC	6th	8	1	6	7	2
2014	Sweden	Oly	2nd place, silver medalist(s)	6	2	2	4	2
Senior totals				88	32	42	74	50

== Awards ==
=== International ===
Award	Year(s) awarded
Swedish Championship	2005
IIHF Hall of Fame	2018

=== NHL ===
Award	Year(s) awarded
NHL All-Star Game	1996, 1997, 1998, 2004, 2008, 2012
NHL All-Rookie Team	1996
Calder Memorial Trophy	1996
NHL second All-Star team	2006
King Clancy Memorial Trophy	2012
Mark Messier Leadership Award	2013

=== Outside of ice hockey ===
On 7 June 2016 Alfredsson received an honorary degree from Carleton University for his outstanding contributions to Canadian hockey and, in particular, his commitment to the community through philanthropic efforts that include mental health awareness and advocacy for equality of athletes, regardless of their sexual orientation. On 25 November 2016, he was awarded the Meritorious Service Cross by Governor General David Johnston.

== Records and achievements ==
=== Records ===
- Holds the Senators record for regular season goals, assists and points.
- Holds the Senators record for highest +/- rating in a season, set in 2006–07 with +42.
- Holds the Senators record for most points in a regular season game, set in 2007–08, with 3 goals and 4 assists for 7 points.
- Holds the Senators playoff records for most games played, goals, assists and points.

=== Milestones ===
- Scored the 300th goal of his career on 10 November 2007.
- Recorded the 500th assist of his career on 24 January 2008.
- Played in his 1,000th NHL game (all with the Ottawa Senators) on 6 April 2010 against the Florida Panthers.
- Reached the 1,000-point milestone with a hat-trick against the Buffalo Sabres on 22 October 2010.
- Scored his 400th career goal in OT against the Calgary Flames on 30 December 2011.

=== Nominations ===
- Finished 2nd in Lady Byng Memorial Trophy voting in 2003–04.
- Finished 3rd in Selke Trophy voting as the best defensive forward in 2005–06.
- Finished 4th in Lady Byng Memorial Trophy voting as the NHL's most gentlemanly player in 2005–06.
- Finished in the top 3 in voting for the Bill Masterton Memorial Trophy in 2011–2012.

=== Other ===
- Scored the first shootout goal in NHL history during the 2005–06 season.
- Led the Swedish Gold Medal-winning Olympic hockey team in scoring (with 5 goals and 5 assists in 8 games played) during the 2006 Winter Olympics in Torino, Italy.
- 10 April 2010 was officially declared as "Daniel Alfredsson Day" in Ottawa, in honour of his 1,000th NHL game.
- Was the first European-born and trained captain to lead his team to the Stanley Cup Final in 2007.
- Improved his point totals for six consecutive seasons from 1998–99 to 2005–06 inclusive, a franchise record.
- Appears on the cover of the Swedish version of the EA Sports NHL 09 video game.
- Won the first major award in modern Senators history when he was awarded the Calder Memorial Trophy in 1995–96.
- He has played in 119 of the playoff games of the modern Senators.
- He led the league in goals during the 2006–07 playoffs and tied linemates Jason Spezza and Dany Heatley with 22 points to lead the league in playoff scoring.
- Daniel Alfredsson became the first player in modern Senators history to have his jersey number retired in December 2016.
- He was elected to the Hockey Hall of Fame in 2022.

== See also ==
- List of Swedes in sports
- List of NHL players with 1,000 games played
- List of NHL players with 1,000 points

== Notes and references ==
Awards and achievements
Preceded by Peter Forsberg	Winner of the Calder Memorial Trophy; 1996	Succeeded by Bryan Berard
Preceded by Doug Weight	Winner of the King Clancy Memorial Trophy; 2012	Succeeded by Patrice Bergeron
Sporting positions
Preceded by Alexei Yashin	Ottawa Senators captain 1999–2013	Succeeded by Jason Spezza
