= 2008–09 Montreal Canadiens season =

NHL hockey team season

2008–09 Montreal Canadiens
- Division: 2nd Northeast
- Conference: 8th Eastern
- 2008–09 record: 41–30–11
- Home record: 24–10–7
- Road record: 17–20–4
- Goals for: 249
- Goals against: 247

Team information
- General manager: Bob Gainey
- Coach: Guy Carbonneau (Oct. 10–Mar. 9); Bob Gainey (interim, Mar. 9–Apr. 22)
- Captain: Saku Koivu
- Alternate captains: Chris Higgins (Oct.–Jan.); Mike Komisarek (Jan.–Apr.); Alexei Kovalev
- Arena: Bell Centre
- Average attendance: 21,273 (100.0%)

Team leaders
- Goals: Alexei Kovalev (26)
- Assists: Andrei Markov (52)
- Points: Alexei Kovalev (65)
- Penalty minutes: Mike Komisarek (121)
- Plus/minus: Alex Tanguay (+12)
- Wins: Carey Price (23)
- Goals against average: Carey Price (2.83)

The 2008–09 Montreal Canadiens season was their 100th season and 92nd in the National Hockey League (NHL). While it was widely believed that the 2008–09 season marked the team's centennial, this would not be until the following season with the Canadiens' 100th anniversary taking place on December 4, 2009.

The 2008 NHL entry draft took place in Ottawa on June 20–21, followed by the free agency period which began on July 1.

== Off-season ==
Throughout much of the off-season, Canadiens' general manager Bob Gainey pursued a possible contract with unrestricted free agent Mats Sundin, formerly the captain of Montreal's historic rival, the Toronto Maple Leafs. The signing efforts started prior to July 1, 2008, and continued into August, as Gainey was still actively pursuing Sundin. This, despite the fact that Sundin's agent mentioned his player "wasn't close" to making a decision on his future, and was strongly considering retirement. The chase ended with the acquisition of forward Robert Lang from the Chicago Blackhawks.

The Canadiens also acquired veteran forward Alex Tanguay from the Calgary Flames in exchange for the 25th overall pick in the 2007–2008 entry draft. Enforcer Georges Laraque and goaltender Marc Denis were signed to the team through free agency. Unrestricted free agents Michael Ryder, Mark Streit and Bryan Smolinski did not return to the team.

== Preseason ==
The preseason schedule consisted of the team playing nine games in 13 days. The team claimed victory in six of these encounters. The initial game of the pre-season was played against the Boston Bruins in Halifax, Nova Scotia. The Canadiens took part in the CBC's Kraft Hockeyville series by playing a game against the Buffalo Sabres at the Sporting Centre Benoît Levesque in Roberval, Quebec.

Some noteworthy performances at the Canadiens training camp were put forth by prospects Max Pacioretty, Yannick Weber and Ben Maxwell.

== Regular season ==
=== Early Centennial year celebrations ===
The team announced its intention to retire two uniform numbers during the 2008–09 season. As of March 2009, the only confirmed number is Patrick Roy's number 33, which was retired on November 22, 2008. In celebration of the Montreal Canadiens' centennial, the 2009 NHL All-Star Game was held in Montreal on January 25, 2009, and the 2009 NHL entry draft, scheduled for June 2009, was awarded to the city.

=== October ===
"I think everybody now can turn the page and get excited."

— Guy Carbonneau, after the Montreal Canadiens concluded their preseason schedule.

On October 10, the Canadiens embarked on a trip for three consecutive road games where they opened the season against the Buffalo Sabres, at the HSBC Arena. Montreal lost the opening game of the season in shootout, but subsequently won 6–1 against the Toronto Maple Leafs on October 11 and 5–3 against the Philadelphia Flyers on October 13. The team returned to Montreal after four days on the road and a 2–0–1 record. The Canadiens hosted the Boston Bruins for their 100th home opening game and won 4–3 in shootout, with Alex Tanguay scoring the winning goal.

On October 18, Saku Koivu achieved his 422nd assist with the Montreal Canadiens and surpassed Maurice "the Rocket" Richard at number seven for all-time assists in franchise history. Two days later, he got his 600th NHL career point when the Canadiens defeated the Florida Panthers 3–1.

According to a Forbes report published in late October 2008, the franchise ranks as the third most valuable in the NHL at US$334 million, making an 18% increase in the past season. The Toronto Maple Leafs and Detroit Red Wings were respectively ranked first and second in the report. The Canadiens finished October with a 7–1–1 record in Minnesota and concluded the month with two consecutive road wins and a perfect overall road record.

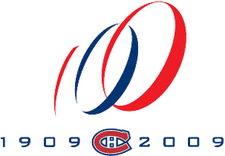

=== November ===
On November 1, against the New York Islanders, Andrei Markov became the second defenceman in franchise history, after Guy Lapointe, to get five points in his first five road games of the season. On November 10, the league announced that forward Tom Kostopoulos was suspended for three games after hitting Toronto Maple Leafs defenceman Mike Van Ryn from behind. On November 11, Chris Higgins got his first NHL career hat-trick in a 4–0 win against the Ottawa Senators. On November 22, the jersey number 33 of legendary goaltender Patrick Roy was retired.

On November 24, against the New York Islanders, Ryan O'Byrne scored on his own net during a delayed penalty call, where Carey Price was pulled off for an extra attacker. On November 29, Mike Komisarek—who was not playing due to injury—temporarily took a place behind the bench as an assistant coach, in replacement of Doug Jarvis, who was at his father's bedside. Rookie right winger Matt D'Agostini was recalled from Hamilton Bulldogs of the American Hockey League (AHL) and Roman Hamrlik got his 400th NHL career assist in a 3–2 win over the Buffalo Sabres.

=== December ===
On December 2, Saku Koivu achieved his 612th point with the Montreal Canadiens after recording two assists in a 5–4 win over the Atlanta Thrashers. He tied Mats Näslund at 11th for all-time points in franchise history. Koivu then surpassed Naslund on December 6 after recording an assist in a 2–1 overtime loss over the New Jersey Devils. Matt D'Agostini scored his first NHL career goal and point and Roman Hamrlik played his 100th game with the club.

The Montreal Canadiens celebrated the 99th anniversary of the franchise on December 4 with a 6–2 win over the New York Rangers. Matt D'Agostini got his first NHL assist in a two-point performance. Georges Laraque got his first two points with his new team. D'Agostini had a successful debut with the team, recording six goals and two assists in his first 11 games. On December 13, Ben Maxwell played his first game in the NHL against the Washington Capitals after Saku Koivu was placed on the injured reserve list. On December 18, against the Philadelphia Flyers, Alexei Kovalev got his 900th NHL career point.

After the Christmas break, the Canadiens were back in action on the road on December 27 and won 3–2 against the Pittsburgh Penguins. The Montreal Canadiens enjoyed their 3000th franchise victory, with a 5–2 win over the Florida Panthers at Sunrise on December 29, solidifying their place as the most successful team in NHL history. Andrei Kostitsyn and Maxim Lapierre scored their first career hat-tricks during this road trip.

=== January ===
General Manager Bob Gainey presented his mid-season report on January 13. He stated that he was looking to improve the team's power play, which was 26th in the league, and he wanted to acquire a proven player capable of helping the power play. When asked by a reporter what was his best transaction since taking over as the team's general manager, he answered that the hiring of Guy Carbonneau as head coach was his best move.

=== February ===
In order to help bolster their power play, Bob Gainey acquired Mathieu Schneider from the Atlanta Thrashers for a combination of draft picks. This is Schneider's second tenure with the Canadiens, who began his career in Montreal after being drafted by the team in 1987.

On February 17, Alexei Kovalev was asked by managing director Bob Gainey to go home and take a rest. He missed two games. There were rumors that he would be traded and the city was abuzz. Kovalev rejoined the team on February 21 and scored one goal and added two assists in a convincing 5–3 win over the Ottawa Senators. Kovalev received the first star of the game to the delight of the Montreal crowd.

A reporter for the Montreal newspaper La Presse stated on the evening of February 19 that the February 20 edition of the paper would have an exposé that would make the Kovalev situation seem inconsequential. The paper reported that Roman Hamrlik and brothers Andrei and Sergei Kostitsyn were involved with a person believed to be part of an organized crime ring in Montreal. Although the players have admitted that they know the person in question, no accusations nor proof has been provided indicating that the players were involved in any illegal activities. The article has since been written off as tabloid journalism and a major example on how the Montreal media negatively treat the Canadiens players.

On February 26, Gainey traded Steve Begin to the Dallas Stars for Doug Janik, who was immediately sent to the Hamilton Bulldogs. Begin, who was often a healthy scratch during the season, would have been an unrestricted free agent at the end of the season.

Saku Koivu scored his 624th point with the Canadiens with an assist in a February 27 game against the Philadelphia Flyers. He became the tenth all-time leading scorer in Canadiens history, surpassing Elmer Lach.

The Canadiens claimed Glen Metropolit off waivers from the Philadelphia Flyers on February 27. Metropolit was practicing with the Flyers earlier in the day when Flyers General Manager Paul Holmgren informed him, "I've got good news and bad news. The good news is that you're playing tonight. The bad news is that you're playing for the Canadiens." The Canadiens were in town playing the Flyers that same day and Metropolit simply moved his equipment to the visitor's dressing room.

=== March ===
Approaching the NHL trade deadline, Bob Gainey traded for Mathieu Schneider and claimed Glen Metropolit. Gainey confirmed that he couldn't risk trading away his young prospects for any "rental players."

On March 9, Gainey announced that he was replacing Guy Carbonneau as head coach until the end of the season. Don Lever was named assistant-coach.

Patrice Brisebois played his 1,000th NHL game on March 14 in a 3–2 loss to the New Jersey Devils. During that same game, Martin Brodeur tied the all-time NHL record for career wins with 551, tying Canadiens great Patrick Roy, who was in attendance at that game. Brodeur was given the first star of the game and received a standing ovation from his home province crowd.

Alex Tanguay scored a season-high five points (two goals and three assists) on March 24 in a 6–3 win against the Atlanta Thrashers at the Bell Centre.

Alexei Kovalev scored his 100th goal as a member of the Canadiens (and 23rd goal of the season) in a 4–1 win against the Chicago Blackhawks on March 31.

=== April ===
The Canadiens finished the regular season having tied the Carolina Hurricanes for the most power play opportunities, with 374.

== Standings ==
=== Divisional standings ===
Northeast Division
		GP	W	L	OTL	GF	GA	Pts
**1**	**z – Boston Bruins**	**82**	**53**	**19**	**10**	**274**	**196**	**116**
**2**	**Montreal Canadiens**	**82**	**41**	**30**	**11**	**249**	**247**	**93**
3	Buffalo Sabres	82	41	32	9	250	234	91
4	Ottawa Senators	82	36	35	11	217	237	83
5	Toronto Maple Leafs	82	34	35	13	250	293	81

=== Conference standings ===
Eastern Conference
R		Div	GP	W	L	OTL	GF	GA	Pts
**1**	**z – Boston Bruins**	**NE**	**82**	**53**	**19**	**10**	**274**	**196**	116
**2**	**y – Washington Capitals**	**SE**	**82**	**50**	**24**	**8**	**272**	**245**	108
**3**	**y – New Jersey Devils**	**AT**	**82**	**51**	**27**	**4**	**244**	**209**	106
**4**	**Pittsburgh Penguins**	**AT**	**82**	**45**	**28**	**9**	**264**	**239**	99
**5**	**Philadelphia Flyers**	**AT**	**82**	**44**	**27**	**11**	**264**	**238**	99
**6**	**Carolina Hurricanes**	**SE**	**82**	**45**	**30**	**7**	**239**	**226**	97
**7**	**New York Rangers**	**AT**	**82**	**43**	**30**	**9**	**210**	**218**	95
**8**	**Montreal Canadiens**	**NE**	**82**	**41**	**30**	**11**	**249**	**247**	93
8.5
9	Florida Panthers	SE	82	41	30	11	234	231	93
10	Buffalo Sabres	NE	82	41	32	9	250	234	91
11	Ottawa Senators	NE	82	36	35	11	217	237	83
12	Toronto Maple Leafs	NE	82	34	35	13	250	293	81
13	Atlanta Thrashers	SE	82	35	41	6	257	280	76
14	Tampa Bay Lightning	SE	82	24	40	18	210	279	66
15	New York Islanders	AT	82	26	47	9	201	279	61

bold – qualified for playoffs, y – division winner, z – placed first in conference (and division)

AT – Atlantic Division, NE – Northeast Division, SE – Southeast Division

== Schedule and results ==
Win (2 points) Loss (0 points) Overtime/shootout loss (1 point)

2008–09 game log
Preseason
Preseason record: 6–3–0 (home: 5–1–0; road: 1–2–0)

Date	Visitor	Score	Home	Location	In goal	Att	Record	Recap
September 22	Montreal Canadiens	3–8	Boston Bruins	Halifax, Nova Scotia	Halak, Denis	10,595	0–1–0	
September 23	Buffalo Sabres	2–3	Montreal Canadiens	Roberval, Quebec	Denis	1,000	1–1–0	
September 24	Montreal Canadiens	3–2 SO	Detroit Red Wings	Detroit, MI	Price, Desjardins	15,319	2–1–0	
September 26	Ottawa Senators	0–5	Montreal Canadiens	Montreal	Halak	21,273	3–1–0	
September 27	Montreal Canadiens	1–3	Ottawa Senators	Kanata, Ontario	Desjardins, Denis	20,282	3–2–0	
September 28	Florida Panthers	2–3 SO	Montreal Canadiens	Montreal	Halak	21,273	4–2–0	
September 30	Detroit Red Wings	1–2 SO	Montreal Canadiens	Montreal	Price	21,273	5–2–0	
October 1	Boston Bruins	1–3	Montreal Canadiens	Montreal	Halak	21,273	6–2–0	
October 4	Minnesota Wild	3–0	Montreal Canadiens	Montreal	Price	21,273	6–3–0	

October
Monthly record: 7–1–1 (home: 4–1–0; road: 3–0–1)

#	Date	Visitor	Score	Home	Decision	Attendance	Record	Points	Recap
1	October 10	Montreal Canadiens	1–2 SO	Buffalo Sabres	Price	18,690	0–0–1	1	
2	October 11	Montreal Canadiens	6–1	Toronto Maple Leafs	Halak	19,370	1–0–1	3	
3	October 13	Montreal Canadiens	5–3	Philadelphia Flyers	Price	19,323	2–0–1	5	
4	October 15	Boston Bruins	3–4 SO	Montreal Canadiens	Price	21,273	3–0–1	7	
5	October 18	Phoenix Coyotes	1–4	Montreal Canadiens	Price	21,273	4–0–1	9	
6	October 20	Florida Panthers	1–3	Montreal Canadiens	Halak	21,273	5–0–1	11	
7	October 25	Anaheim Ducks	6–4	Montreal Canadiens	Price*	21,273	5–1–1	11	
8	October 28	Carolina Hurricanes	2–3 SO	Montreal Canadiens	Price	21,273	6–1–1	13	
9	October 30	Montreal Canadiens	2–1	Minnesota Wild	Price	18,568	7–1–1	15	
*Halak was replaced after the 4th goal by Anaheim. Price was credited with the decision as he let in the game winning 5th goal.

November
Monthly record: 6–5–3 (home: 2–1–2; road: 4–4–1)
Season record: 13–6–4 (home: 6–2–2; road: 7–4–2)

#	Date	Visitor	Score	Home	Decision	Attendance	Record	Points	Recap
10	November 1	Montreal Canadiens	5–4	New York Islanders	Price	14,429	8–1–1	17	
11	November 7	Montreal Canadiens	3–4 SO	Columbus Blue Jackets	Halak	14,603	8–1–2	18	
12	November 8	Montreal Canadiens	3–6	Toronto Maple Leafs	Price	19,512	8–2–2	18	
13	November 11	Ottawa Senators	0–4	Montreal Canadiens	Price	21,273	9–2–2	20	
14	November 13	Montreal Canadiens	1–6	Boston Bruins	Price	16,816	9–3–2	20	
15	November 15	Philadelphia Flyers	2–1	Montreal Canadiens	Halak	21,273	9–4–2	20	
16	November 16	Montreal Canadiens	3–2 SO	St. Louis Blues	Price	19,150	10–4–2	22	
17	November 18	Montreal Canadiens	1–2	Carolina Hurricanes	Price	12,164	10–5–2	22	
18	November 20	Montreal Canadiens	3–2 SO	Ottawa Senators	Price	20,475	11–5–2	24	
19	November 22	Boston Bruins	3–2 SO	Montreal Canadiens	Price	21,273	11–5–3	25	
20	November 24	New York Islanders	4–3 SO	Montreal Canadiens	Price	21,273	11–5–4	26	
21	November 26	Montreal Canadiens	3–1	Detroit Red Wings	Price	20,066	12–5–4	28	
22	November 28	Montreal Canadiens	0–3	Washington Capitals	Halak	18,277	12–6–4	28	
23	November 29	Buffalo Sabres	2–3	Montreal Canadiens	Price	21,273	13–6–4	30	

December
Monthly record: 8–3–2 (home: 5–2–2; road: 3–1–0)
Season record: 21–9–6 (home: 11–4–4; road: 10–5–2)

#	Date	Visitor	Score	Home	Decision	Attendance	Record	Points	Recap
24	December 2	Atlanta Thrashers	4–5	Montreal Canadiens	Price	21,273	14–6–4	32	
25	December 4	New York Rangers	2–6	Montreal Canadiens	Price	21,273	15–6–4	34	
26	December 6	New Jersey Devils	2–1 OT	Montreal Canadiens	Price	21,273	15–6–5	35	
27	December 9	Calgary Flames	1–4	Montreal Canadiens	Halak	21,273	16–6–5	37	
28	December 11	Tampa Bay Lightning	3–1	Montreal Canadiens	Halak	21,273	16–7–5	37	
29	December 13	Washington Capitals	2–1	Montreal Canadiens	Halak	21,273	16–8–5	37	
30	December 16	Montreal Canadiens	2–3	Carolina Hurricanes	Halak	16,434	16–9–5	37	
31	December 18	Philadelphia Flyers	2–5	Montreal Canadiens	Halak	21,273	17–9–5	39	
32	December 20	Buffalo Sabres	3–4 OT	Montreal Canadiens	Halak	21,273	18–9–5	41	
33	December 21	Carolina Hurricanes	3–2 OT	Montreal Canadiens	Price	21,273	18–9–6	42	
34	December 27	Montreal Canadiens	3–2	Pittsburgh Penguins	Price	17,132	19–9–6	44	
35	December 29	Montreal Canadiens	5–2	Florida Panthers	Price	20,741	20–9–6	46	
36	December 30	Montreal Canadiens	2–1 SO	Tampa Bay Lightning	Price	20,454	21–9–6	48	

January
Monthly record: 7–6–0 (home: 5–0–0; road: 2–6–0)
Season record: 28–15–6 (home: 16–4–4; road: 12–11–2)

#	Date	Visitor	Score	Home	Decision	Attendance	Record	Points	Recap
37	January 2	Montreal Canadiens	1–4	New Jersey Devils	Halak	17,625	21–10–6	48	
38	January 4	Florida Panthers	5–6 SO	Montreal Canadiens	Halak	21,273	22–10–6	50	
39	January 7	Montreal Canadiens	6–3	New York Rangers	Halak	18,200	23–10–6	52	
40	January 8	Toronto Maple Leafs	2–6	Montreal Canadiens	Halak	21,273	24–10–6	54	
41	January 10	Washington Capitals	4–5	Montreal Canadiens	Halak	21,273	25–10–6	56	
42	January 13	Montreal Canadiens	1–3	Boston Bruins	Halak	17,565	25–11–6	56	
43	January 15	Nashville Predators	2–3	Montreal Canadiens	Halak	21,273	26–11–6	58	
44	January 17	Montreal Canadiens	5–4 SO	Ottawa Senators	Halak	20,413	27–11–6	60	
45	January 20	Montreal Canadiens	2–4	Atlanta Thrashers	Halak	13,076	27–12–6	60	
46	January 21	Montreal Canadiens	2–5	New Jersey Devils	Price	16,235	27–13–6	60	
47	January 27	Montreal Canadiens	3–5	Tampa Bay Lightning	Price	15,912	27–14–6	60	
48	January 29	Montreal Canadiens	1–5	Florida Panthers	Price	16,334	27–15–6	60	
49	January 31	Los Angeles Kings	3–4	Montreal Canadiens	Price	21,273	28–15–6	62	

February
Monthly record: 6–7–1 (home: 4–2–0; road: 2–5–1)
Season record: 34–22–7 (home: 20–6–4; road: 14–16–3)

#	Date	Visitor	Score	Home	Decision	Attendance	Record	Points	Recap
50	February 1	Boston Bruins	3–1	Montreal Canadiens	Price	21,273	28–16–6	62	
51	February 3	Pittsburgh Penguins	2–4	Montreal Canadiens	Price	21,273	29–16–6	64	
52	February 6	Montreal Canadiens	2–3	Buffalo Sabres	Price	18,161	29–17–6	64	
53	February 7	Toronto Maple Leafs	5–2	Montreal Canadiens	Price	21,273	29–18–6	64	
54	February 9	Montreal Canadiens	2–6	Calgary Flames	Price	19,289	29–19–6	64	
55	February 11	Montreal Canadiens	2–7	Edmonton Oilers	Price	16,839	29–20–6	64	
56	February 13	Montreal Canadiens	4–2	Colorado Avalanche	Halak	17,514	30–20–6	66	
57	February 15	Montreal Canadiens	2–4	Vancouver Canucks	Halak	18,630	30–21–6	66	
58	February 18	Montreal Canadiens	3–4 SO	Washington Capitals	Price	18,277	30–21–7	67	
59	February 19	Montreal Canadiens	4–5	Pittsburgh Penguins	Price	16,968	30–22–7	67	
60	February 21	Ottawa Senators	3–5	Montreal Canadiens	Halak	21,273	31–22–7	69	
61	February 24	Vancouver Canucks	0–3	Montreal Canadiens	Halak	21,273	32–22–7	71	
62	February 27	Montreal Canadiens	4–3 OT	Philadelphia Flyers	Halak	19,881	33–22–7	73	
63	February 28	San Jose Sharks	2–3	Montreal Canadiens	Halak	21,273	34–22–7	75	

March
Monthly record: 5–5–3 (home: 4–2–3; road: 1–3–0)
Season record: 39–27–10 (home: 24–8–7; road: 15–19–3)

#	Date	Visitor	Score	Home	Decision	Attendance	Record	Points	Recap
64	March 4	Montreal Canadiens	1–5	Buffalo Sabres	Price	18,690	34–23–7	75	
65	March 6	Montreal Canadiens	0–2	Atlanta Thrashers	Price	14,900	34–24–7	75	
66	March 8	Montreal Canadiens	3–1	Dallas Stars	Price	17,646	35–24–7	77	
67	March 10	Edmonton Oilers	3–4 OT	Montreal Canadiens	Price	21,273	36–24–7	79	
68	March 12	New York Islanders	3–2 OT	Montreal Canadiens	Price	21,273	36–24–8	80	
69	March 14	New Jersey Devils	3–1	Montreal Canadiens	Halak	21,273	36–25–8	80	
70	March 17	New York Rangers	4–3 SO	Montreal Canadiens	Price	21,273	36–25–9	81	
71	March 19	Montreal Canadiens	4–5	Ottawa Senators	Halak	20,500	36–26–9	81	
72	March 21	Toronto Maple Leafs	5–2	Montreal Canadiens	Halak	21,273	36–27–9	81	
73	March 24	Atlanta Thrashers	3–6	Montreal Canadiens	Price	21,273	37–27–9	83	
74	March 26	Tampa Bay Lightning	2–3 OT	Montreal Canadiens	Price	21,273	38–27–9	85	
75	March 28	Buffalo Sabres	4–3 SO	Montreal Canadiens	Price	21,273	38–27–10	86	
76	March 31	Chicago Blackhawks	1–4	Montreal Canadiens	Price	21,273	39–27–10	88	

April
Monthly record: 2–3–1 (home: 0–2–0; road: 2–1–1)
Season record: 41–30–11 (home: 24–10–7; road: 17–20–4)

#	Date	Visitor	Score	Home	Decision	Attendance	Record	Points	Recap
77	April 2	Montreal Canadiens	5–1	New York Islanders	Halak	15,255	40–27–10	90	
78	April 4	Montreal Canadiens	6–2	Toronto Maple Leafs	Halak	19,516	41–27–10	92	
79	April 6	Ottawa Senators	3–2	Montreal Canadiens	Halak	21,273	41–28–10	92	
80	April 7	Montreal Canadiens	3–1	New York Rangers	Price	18,200	41–29–10	92	
81	April 9	Montreal Canadiens	4–5 OT	Boston Bruins	Price	17,565	41–29–11	93	
82	April 11	Pittsburgh Penguins	3–1	Montreal Canadiens	Price	21,273	41–30–11	93	

Schedule

== Playoffs ==
=== Eastern Conference Quarterfinals: vs. (1) Boston Bruins ===
For an NHL-record 32nd time, the Bruins and Canadiens faced each other in the playoffs. The Boston Bruins entered the playoffs after finishing the regular season with the best record in the Eastern Conference with 116 points. The Montreal Canadiens qualified for the postseason as the eighth seed with 93 points, winning the tiebreaker over the Florida Panthers based on the season series (six points to three).

Boston swept Montreal, four games to none, scoring at least four goals in each win. With the score tied 2–2 entering the third period of game one, Bruins captain Zdeno Chara scored a power play goal at 11:15 and Phil Kessel added an empty net score in the closing seconds to clinch the victory. Boston scored three power play goals, including two from Marc Savard, en route to a 5–1 victory in game two. Game three resembled game one in that both teams fought to a 2–2 tie midway through the game, but like the first contest the Bruins scored the go-ahead winning goal again. This time it was Michael Ryder at 17:21 in the second period. Montreal scored in the first minute of game four off the stick of Andrei Kostitsyn, but Boston went on to dominate the rest of the game, grabbing two goals from Ryder in a 4–1 victory, to win the series.

2009 Stanley Cup playoffs – Eastern Conference Quarter-finals vs. (1) Boston Bruins

#	Date	Venue	Visitor	Score	Home	OT	Montreal goals	Boston goals	Decision	Attendance	Series	Recap
1	April 16	TD Banknorth Garden	Montreal	2–4	Boston Bruins		Higgins, Kovalev	Kessel, Krejci, Chara (PP), Kessel (EN)	Thomas	17,565	Boston leads 1–0	
2	April 18	TD Banknorth Garden	Montreal	1–5	Boston Bruins		Kovalev	Savard (PP), Kobasew, Hnidy, Savard (PP), Ryder (PP)	Thomas	17,565	Boston leads 2–0	
3	April 20	Bell Centre	Boston Bruins	4–2	Montreal		Higgins, Weber	Kessel, Thornton, Ryder, Kobasew (EN)	Thomas	21,273	Boston leads 3–0	
4	April 22	Bell Centre	Boston Bruins	4–1	Montreal		A. Kostitsyn	Ryder, Krejci, Kessel, Ryder	Thomas	21,273	Boston wins 4–0	

* Player scoring winning goal is shown in italics.

== Player statistics ==
=== Skaters ===
Note: GP = Games played; G = Goals; A = Assists; Pts = Points; +/− = Plus/minus; PIM = Penalty minutes

Regular season

Player	GP	G	A	Pts	+/−	PIM
Alexei Kovalev	78	26	39	65	−5	74
Andrei Markov	78	12	52	64	−2	36
Saku Koivu	65	16	34	50	4	44
Andrei Kostitsyn	74	23	18	41	−7	50
Alex Tanguay	50	16	25	41	13	34
Tomas Plekanec	76	20	19	39	−7	54
Robert Lang	50	18	21	39	6	36
Roman Hamrlik	81	6	27	33	4	62
Maxim Lapierre	79	15	13	28	9	76
Guillaume Latendresse	56	14	12	26	4	45
Chris Higgins	57	12	11	23	−1	22
Sergei Kostitsyn	56	8	15	23	−3	64
Josh Gorges	81	4	19	23	12	37
Tom Kostopoulos	78	8	14	22	−1	106
Matt D'Agostini	53	12	9	21	−17	16
Patrice Brisebois	62	5	13	18	−3	19
Mathieu Schneider^{†}	24	5	12	17	−2	14
Mathieu Dandenault	41	4	8	12	7	17
Max Pacioretty	34	3	8	11	−3	27
Mike Komisarek	66	2	9	11	0	121
Steve Begin^{‡}	42	6	4	10	−5	27
Francis Bouillon	54	5	4	9	−7	53
Ryan O'Byrne	37	0	5	5	−7	58
Kyle Chipchura	13	0	3	3	−6	5
Glen Metropolit^{†}	18	2	1	3	−4	13
Georges Laraque	33	0	2	2	−6	61
Yannick Weber	3	0	1	1	−1	2
Gregory Stewart	20	0	1	1	−4	32
Alex Henry	2	0	0	0	−2	10
Ben Maxwell	7	0	0	0	−1	2

Playoffs

Player	GP	G	A	Pts	+/−	PIM
Alexei Kovalev	4	2	1	3	0	2
Saku Koivu	4	0	3	3	−1	2
Chris Higgins	4	2	0	2	−1	2
Yannick Weber	3	1	1	2	0	0
Glen Metropolit	4	0	2	2	0	2
Andrei Kostitsyn	4	1	0	1	−2	2
Josh Gorges	4	0	1	1	0	7
Alex Tanguay	2	0	1	1	2	2
Tom Kostopoulos	4	0	1	1	−1	4
Georges Laraque	4	0	0	0	−1	4
Ryan O'Byrne	2	0	0	0	−1	2
Guillaume Latendresse	4	0	0	0	−2	12
Mathieu Dandenault	4	0	0	0	−2	0
Maxim Lapierre	4	0	0	0	−3	26
Mike Komisarek	4	0	0	0	−4	20
Tomas Plekanec	3	0	0	0	−5	4
Roman Hamrlik	4	0	0	0	−5	2
Matt D'Agostini	3	0	0	0	−5	0
Patrice Brisebois	1	0	0	0	−1	0
Mathieu Schneider	2	0	0	0	−2	4
Sergei Kostitsyn	1	0	0	0	0	2
Francis Bouillon	1	0	0	0	0	0

=== Goaltenders ===
Note: GP = Games played; TOI = Time on ice (minutes); W = Wins; L = Losses; OT = Overtime losses; GA = Goals against; GAA= Goals against average; SA= Shots against; SV= Saves; Sv% = Save percentage; SO= Shutouts

Regular season

Player	GP	TOI	W	L	OT	GA	GAA	SA	Sv%	SO	G	A	PIM
Jaroslav Halak	34	1931	18	14	1	92	2.86	1077	.915	1	0	0	0
Carey Price	52	3036	23	16	10	143	2.83	1513	.905	1	0	1	4

Playoffs

Player	GP	TOI	W	L	GA	GAA	SA	Sv%	SO
Carey Price	4	219	0	4	15	4.11	123	0.878	0
Jaroslav Halak	1	20	0	0	0	0.00	5	1.000	0

^{†}Denotes player spent time with another team before joining Canadiens. Stats reflect time with Canadiens only.
^{‡}Traded mid-season. Stats reflect time with Canadiens only.

== Awards and records ==
=== Team awards ===
On April 11, following the final home game against the Pittsburgh Penguins, the team announced its award winners for the season.

Player	Award	Notes
Carey Price	Molson Cup	Awarded to the Most Valuable Player (MVP) and with the most "three stars" recognitions.
Maxim Lapierre	Jacques Beauchamp Trophy	Awarded by the Sports Writers Association of Montreal to a player for recognition of his outstanding achievement in the game of hockey.

=== National Hockey League Awards ===
==== All-Star Game ====
===== Elected to starting lineup =====
- Alexei Kovalev (RW) (Captain/Eastern Conference All-Star Team, All-Star Game MVP)
- Mike Komisarek (D)
- Andrei Markov (D)
- Carey Price (G)

=== Milestones ===
Regular season
Player	Milestone	Reached
Mike Komisarek	300th NHL career game	October 18, 2008
Saku Koivu	600th NHL career point	October 20, 2008
Andrei Markov	500th NHL career game	October 25, 2008
Roman Hamrlik	400th NHL career assist	November 29, 2008
Matt D'Agostini	1st NHL career goal 1st NHL career point	December 2, 2008
Roman Hamrlík	1,100th NHL career game	December 4, 2008
Matt D'Agostini	1st NHL career assist	December 4, 2008
Alex Kovalev	1,100th NHL career game	December 9, 2008
Ben Maxwell	1st NHL career game	December 13, 2008
Alex Kovalev	900th NHL career point	December 18, 2008
Andrei Kostitsyn	1st NHL career hat-trick	December 27, 2008
Maxim Lapierre	1st NHL career hat-trick	December 29, 2008
Max Pacioretty	1st NHL career game 1st NHL career goal 1st NHL career point	January 2, 2009
Max Pacioretty	1st NHL career assist	January 7, 2009
Yannick Weber	1st NHL career game	January 8, 2009
Gregory Stewart	1st NHL career assist 1st NHL career point	January 17, 2009
Andrei Markov	300th NHL career point	January 17, 2009
Patrice Brisebois	1,000th NHL career game	March 14, 2009
Yannick Weber	1st NHL career assist 1st NHL career point	April 9, 2009

Playoffs
Player	Milestone	Reached
Matt D'Agostini	1st NHL career playoff game	April 16, 2009
Glen Metropolit	1st NHL career playoff assist	April 16, 2009
Yannick Weber	1st NHL career playoff game	April 18, 2009
Yannick Weber	1st NHL career playoff goal 1st NHL career playoff assist 1st NHL career playoff point	April 20, 2009

== Transactions ==
The Canadiens have been involved in the following transactions during the 2008–09 season.

=== Trades ===
June 20, 2008	To Montreal Canadiens Alex Tanguay; 5th-round pick (138th overall) in 2008	To Calgary Flames 1st-round pick (25th overall) in 2008; 2nd-round pick in 2009
September 12, 2008	To Montreal Canadiens Robert Lang	To Chicago Blackhawks 2nd-round pick in 2010
January 5, 2009	To Montreal Canadiens T. J. Kemp	To Pittsburgh Penguins Conditional 7th-round pick in 2010 (Note: Condition not satisfied.)
February 16, 2009	To Montreal Canadiens Mathieu Schneider; Conditional 3rd-round pick in 2009	To Atlanta Thrashers 2nd-round pick in 2009; 3rd-round pick in 2010
February 26, 2009	To Montreal Canadiens Doug Janik	To Dallas Stars Steve Begin
February 27, 2009	To Montreal Canadiens Glen Metropolit	To Philadelphia Flyers Claimed off waivers

=== Free agent acquisitions ===
Player	Former team	Contract terms
Georges Laraque	Pittsburgh Penguins	3 years, $4.5 million
Marc Denis	Tampa Bay Lightning	1 year, undisclosed
Alex Henry	Nashville Predators	1 year, undisclosed
Ryan Flinn	Edmonton Oilers	1 year, undisclosed

=== Players lost to free agency ===
Player	New team
Mark Streit	New York Islanders
Michael Ryder	Boston Bruins
Yann Danis	New York Islanders
Janne Lahti	Jokerit (SM-liiga)
Jonathan Ferland	EC Villacher SV (EBEL)
Brett Engelhardt	Augsburger Panther (DEL)
Duncan Milroy	ERC Ingolstadt (DEL)

== Draft picks ==
Montreal's picks at the 2008 NHL entry draft in Ottawa, Ontario.

Round	#	Player	Position	Nationality	College/junior/club team (league)
2	25	Danny Kristo	RW	United States	U.S. National Team Development Program (NAHL)
3	86	Steve Quailer	RW	United States	Northeastern University (Hockey East)
4	116	Jason Missiaen	G	Canada	Peterborough Petes (OHL)
5	138	Maxim Trunev	F	Russia	Severstal Cherepovets-2 (Rus-3)
7	206	Patrick Johnson	F	United States	University of Wisconsin (WCHA)

== Broadcasting ==
Country	Broadcaster
Canada	English: CBC, TSN, NHL Network; French: RDS, RIS, RDS.CA
USA	Versus, ESPN, NBC, CBS, Fox, HDNet, NHL Network, RDS.CA
Europe	NASN, NHL Network, RDS.CA
Russia	NTV (Russia), RDS.CA
Japan; South Korea	ASN, RDS.CA

== Farm teams ==
=== Hamilton Bulldogs ===
The Hamilton Bulldogs remain Montreal's top affiliate in the American Hockey League in 2008–09.

=== Cincinnati Cyclones ===
Montreal continues their affiliation alongside the Nashville Predators for the Cincinnati Cyclones of the ECHL in 2008–09.

== See also ==
- 2008–09 NHL season
- Montreal Canadiens centennial
