= Carey Price =

Canadian ice hockey player (born 1987)

- Hockey Hall of Fame, 2026
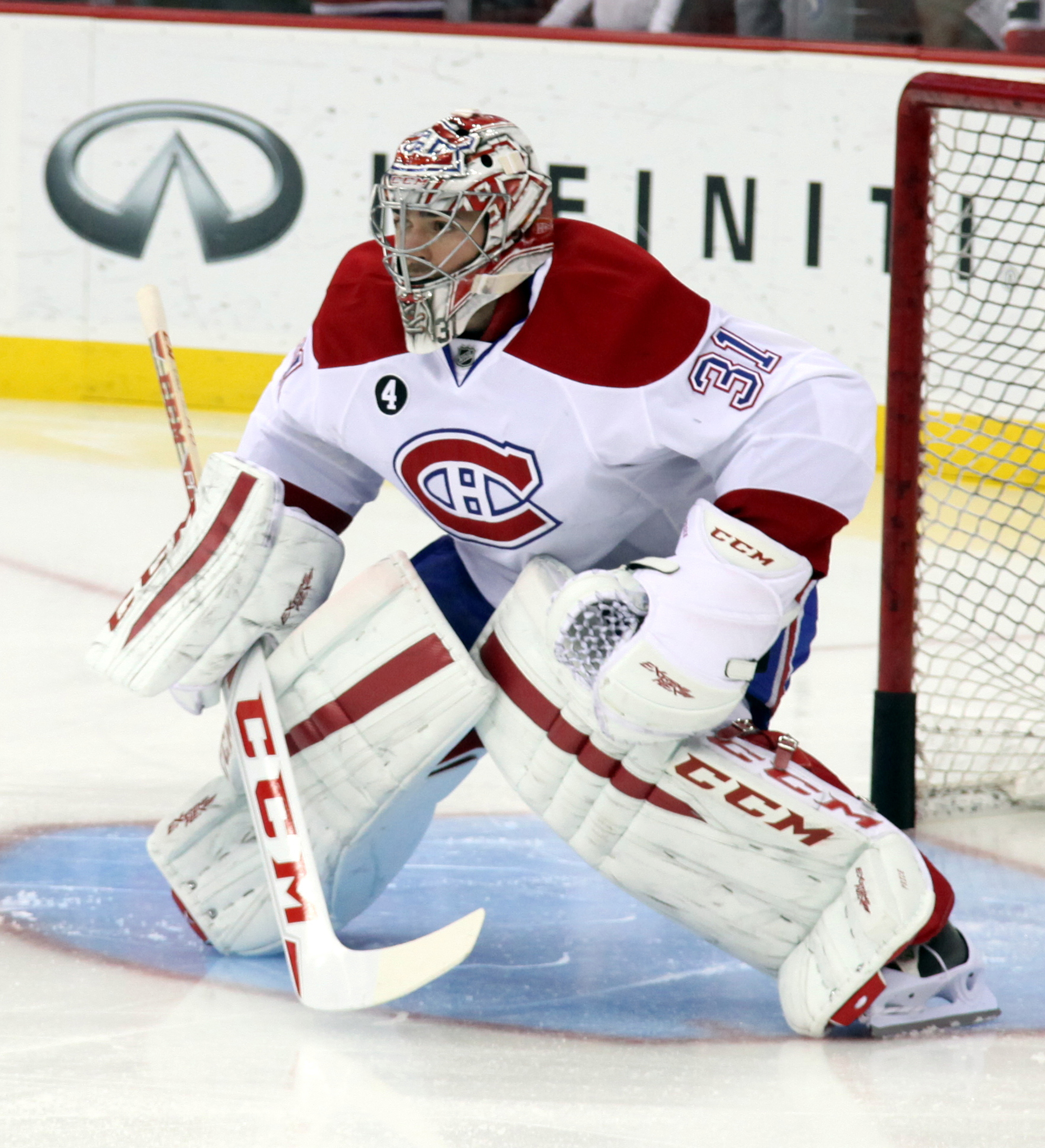
- Price with the Montreal Canadiens in 2015
- Born: August 16, 1987 (age 39) Vancouver, British Columbia, Canada
- Height: 6 ft 3 in (191 cm)
- Weight: 217 lb (98 kg; 15 st 7 lb)
- Position: Goaltender
- Caught: Left
- Played for: Montreal Canadiens
- National team: Canada
- NHL draft: 5th overall, 2005; Montreal Canadiens
- Playing career: 2007–2022

Carey Price (born August 16, 1987) is a Canadian former professional ice hockey player. He played as a goaltender for 15 seasons with the Montreal Canadiens of the National Hockey League (NHL). Considered one of the best goaltenders in the world during his career, Price's 361 wins are the most by a goaltender in Canadiens' franchise history.

Beginning his junior career with the Tri-City Americans in the Western Hockey League (WHL) in 2002, Price was selected fifth overall by the Montreal Canadiens in the 2005 NHL entry draft following his second season with Tri-City. He won the Del Wilson Trophy as the top goaltender in the WHL, and CHL Goaltender of the Year in his final season of major junior in 2007. Joining the Canadiens' American Hockey League (AHL) affiliate Hamilton Bulldogs in advance of that year's Calder Cup playoffs, Price led the Bulldogs to the team's first championship title and won the Jack A. Butterfield Trophy as playoff MVP. Price debuted in the NHL initially in a backup role during the 2007–08 season, before ultimately becoming the starting goaltender later that season. In 2015, he won the Ted Lindsay Award, William M. Jennings Trophy, Vezina Trophy, and Hart Memorial Trophy, becoming the first goaltender in NHL history to win all four awards in the same season. In 2021, Price led the Canadiens to their first Stanley Cup Final appearance since 1993 before eventually losing to the Tampa Bay Lightning in five games.

Internationally, Price has represented Canada at various junior ranked tournaments, winning silver medals at the World U-17 Hockey Challenge in 2004 and the World U18 Championship in 2005. He won a gold medal at the 2007 World Junior Ice Hockey Championships in Sweden. In 2014, Price was named to the Canadian Olympic Hockey Team and led his country to a gold medal at the Winter Olympics in Sochi, posting a .972 save percentage and 0.59 goals against average across five games. His play earned him the tournament's top goaltending award. In 2016, Price went undefeated en route to Team Canada winning the World Cup of Hockey.

== Early life ==
Price was born in Vancouver to parents Lynda and Jerry. His mother previously served as chief of the Ulkatcho First Nation, while his father, also a goaltender, was selected by the Philadelphia Flyers (126th overall) in the 1978 NHL amateur draft. Although Price's father never played in the NHL, he did play four seasons of professional hockey in various leagues and was for a time the goaltending coach of the Tri-City Americans. Price has a younger sister, Kayla, and is second cousins with former professional ice hockey player Shane Doan.

When Price was three, his family relocated to the remote town of Anahim Lake in central British Columbia where his maternal grandfather, James Holte, a Norwegian Canadian, was born and worked as a storekeeper prior to his death in 1964. Following the move, he was taught to play goaltender by his father on a frozen creek during the winter months and played organized hockey in Williams Lake over five hours and 320 kilometres (200 mi) away by car on Highway 20. Having to make the ten-hour round trip three days a week, Carey's father eventually bought a Piper PA-28 Cherokee to fly him to practice and games.

== Playing career ==
=== Tri-City Americans (2003–2007) ===
Price made his first appearance in the Western Hockey League (WHL) for the Tri-City Americans during the 2002–03 season. Securing a full-time roster spot the following season as the backup for Colorado Avalanche prospect Tyler Weiman, Price posted a 2.38 Goals against average (GAA) and .915 save percentage (SV%) appearing in 28 games. He took over as the primary starter of the team beginning in 2004–05 and quickly established himself as a top goaltender, playing in a league-high 63 games with a 2.34 GAA and .920 SV% and eight shutouts. Ranking as the best North American goaltender by NHL Central Scouting, Price was drafted fifth overall by the Montreal Canadiens. This move was considered surprising by many, both because Price was widely projected to be drafted in the middle of the first round, and because the Canadiens' then-current goaltender, José Theodore, had won the Vezina Trophy as the league's best goaltender three years prior.

During the 2005–06 season, Price's play in Tri-City suffered considerably whereas he posted a 2.87 GAA and a .906 SV% across 55 games. Price rebounded with a very strong 2006–07 campaign, posting an excellent 2.45 GAA and .917 SV% while winning both the Del Wilson Trophy as the top WHL goaltender and the CHL Goaltender of the Year award. Despite this, the Americans were eliminated in six games during the 2007 postseason.

=== Hamilton Bulldogs (2007) ===
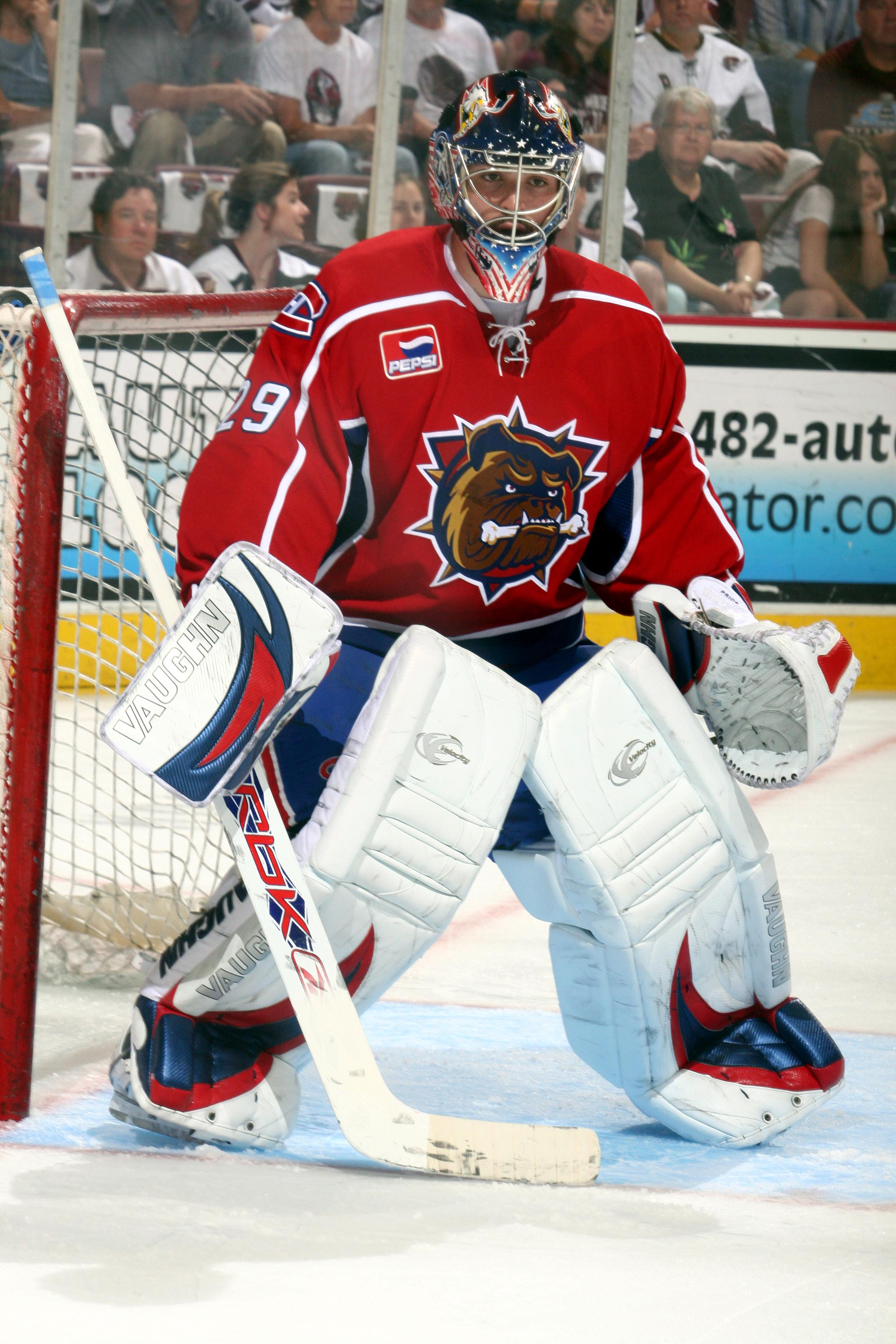
Price playing for the Hamilton Bulldogs in June 2007 during the 2007 Calder Cup Finals

Following Tri-City's early playoff exit, Price joined the Canadiens' American Hockey League (AHL) affiliate, the Hamilton Bulldogs, just before the start of the 2007 Calder Cup playoffs. In two regular season AHL appearances with the Bulldogs, Price allowed only three collective goals and posted a win. He then led the Bulldogs on a remarkable postseason run, defeating the Hershey Bears four games to one in the finals as the team won their first Calder Cup. With this, Price became only the third teenage goaltender to win the Jack A. Butterfield Trophy as AHL playoff MVP, posting a 2.06 GAA and .936 SV%.

=== Montreal Canadiens (2007–2022) ===
==== Early career, Eastern Conference Final runs (2007–2014) ====
Price made his highly anticipated NHL debut on October 10, 2007, against the Pittsburgh Penguins and recorded 26 saves in a 3–2 win. He was awarded the Canadiens' Molson Cup for October, given to the player with the most first-star selections. Although reassigned to the AHL ranks midway through the season in January, he was called back up to Montreal shortly over a month later. With the move of starting goaltender Cristobal Huet to the Washington Capitals before the annual trade deadline, Price assumed the foregoing's role for the Canadiens. He was subsequently named the NHL Rookie of the Month for March and the NHL First Star of the Week (ending April 6, 2008) as the Canadiens finished first overall in the Eastern Conference and earned their first division title since 1991–92. Price completed the regular season leading all rookie goaltenders in wins (24), SV% (.920) and shutouts (3). He was named to the NHL All-Rookie Team in recognition of his accomplishments in his first year in the NHL. Entering the 2008 playoffs against the eighth-seeded Boston Bruins, Price recorded a 1–0 win on April 15, 2008, becoming the first Canadiens rookie to post a playoff shutout since Patrick Roy over two decades prior in 1986. He would go on to record another shutout in game seven to eliminate the Bruins. The Canadiens were then upset in the second round in five games to the sixth-seeded Philadelphia Flyers, with Price losing three of the last four games.

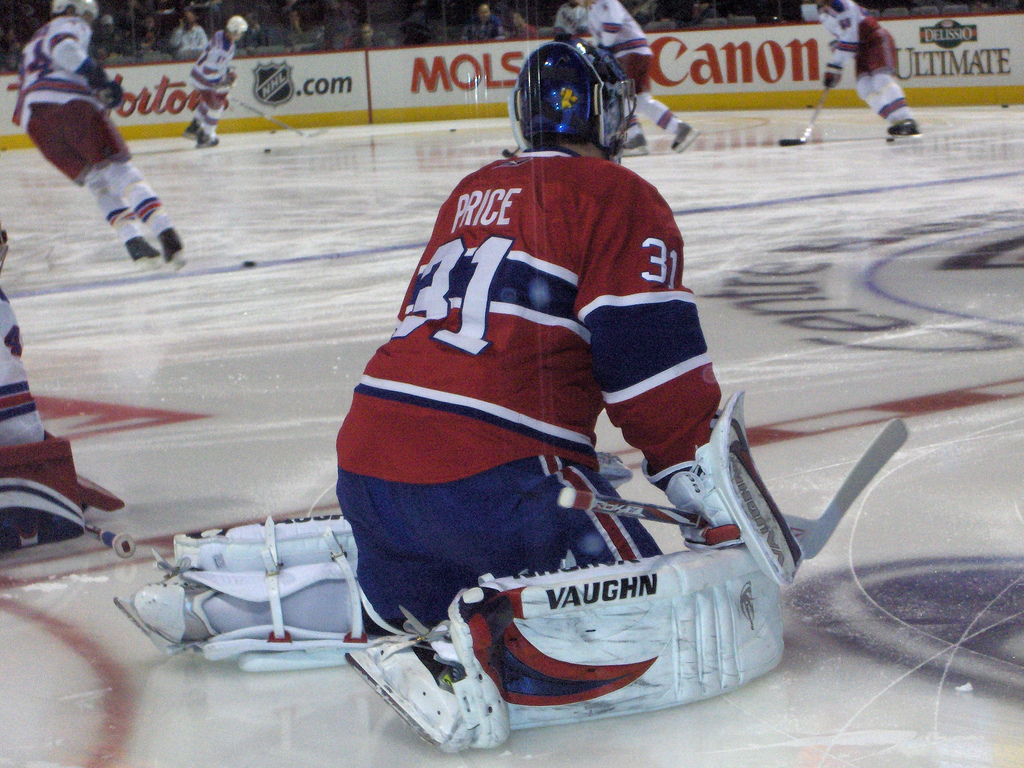
Price warming up prior to a game against the New York Rangers in March 2009

After a strong start to the 2008–09 season, in which he earned a second Molson Cup in November, Price injured his ankle in a game against the Tampa Bay Lightning on December 30, 2008. Forced out of action for nearly a month, during which time he was voted in as a starting goaltender for the 2009 NHL All-Star Game in Montreal (along with teammates Alexei Kovalev, Andrei Markov and Mike Komisarek), he made his return to action on January 20, 2009 replacing backup Jaroslav Halák who was pulled in a 4–2 loss to the Atlanta Thrashers. Qualifying for the 2009 playoffs as the eighth and final seed in the Eastern Conference, the Canadiens played the Boston Bruins in the opening round for the second consecutive season. They were swept in four games, with the Bruins scoring at least four times in each game. In the final game at the Bell Centre in Montreal, Price surrendered four goals in two periods. After stopping a weak dump-in, the crowd cheered sarcastically and Price responded by putting his arms up in the air, similar to Patrick Roy's infamous gesture on December 2, 1995, in a game after which Roy requested a trade from the Canadiens.

Price struggled throughout the 2009–10 season, winning only 13 games and losing the starting job to Halák as the Canadiens entered the 2010 playoffs as the eighth and final seed for the second consecutive season. The highlight of the season for Price was stopping 37 of 38 shots in a 5–1 win over the Boston Bruins in the Canadiens' 100th anniversary game on December 4, 2009, and the low point was surrendering four goals in his only start of the playoffs. Although the Canadiens made a surprisingly long playoff run to the Eastern Conference finals in the 2010 playoffs, upsetting both the Presidents' Trophy-winning Washington Capitals and the defending Stanley Cup champion and fourth-seeded Pittsburgh Penguins along the way before losing in a lopsided five-game series to the seventh-seeded Philadelphia Flyers in the Conference finals, Price appeared in only four games (two in the first round, one in the second round and one in the third round, respectively).

Entering the off-season period, both Price and Halák became restricted free agents whereas a debate emerged amongst fans and experts alike over who should remain with the team – the playoff hero Halák or the younger Price. After weeks of media speculation, the Canadiens chose Price, trading Halák to the St. Louis Blues and re-signing Price to a two-year, $5.5 million contract to return to his role as starting goaltender. During the 2010–11 season, Price played in 72 games recording new career highs including 38 wins, eight shutouts a 2.35 GAA and a .923 SV%, and was selected to play in the 2011 NHL All-Star Game. This collective performance from Price allowed the Canadiens to enter the 2011 playoffs as the sixth seed in the East before ultimately falling in seven games to the third-seeded and eventual Stanley Cup champion Boston Bruins.

On October 26, 2011, Price earned his 100th win in his NHL career in his 214th game against the Philadelphia Flyers. A few months later, he participated in his third All-Star Game. The 2011–12 season, however, did not go well for the Canadiens as a team, and they missed the playoffs for the first time since the 2006–07 season and for the first time in Price's career having finished the season in last place in the Eastern Conference, putting them 14 points behind the last playoff spot in the standings.

On July 2, 2012, Price re-signed with the Canadiens on a six-year contract worth US$39 million. During the lockout-shortened 2012–13 season, Price started the year very well, winning 18 of his first 28 starts as the Canadiens, in stark contrast to the previous season, were one of the best teams in the Eastern Conference, going 29–14–5, good enough for second in the conference. Price's play, however, dropped off in the final weeks of the season, going 2–6 and allowing 27 goals. Nonetheless, the Canadiens went into the 2013 playoffs as the second seed against the seventh-seeded Ottawa Senators. In game 4, with the score tied 2–2 as the third period came to an end, Price suffered a groin injury and did not return for the overtime period and was replaced by backup Peter Budaj; the Senators would go on to score and win the game. Price's injury sidelined him for the rest of the series and the Canadiens were eliminated in five games. Price ended the playoffs with a sub-par 3.26 GAA and a .894 SV%.

The 2013–14 season saw Price play 59 games and record 34 wins to go along with a career-best 2.32 GAA and .927 SV%, leading the Canadiens to their second 100-point season since the 2007–08 season, Price's rookie season. The Canadiens entered the 2014 playoffs as the fourth seed in the Eastern Conference against the Tampa Bay Lightning, whom they swept in four games, marking Price's first playoff series win since 2008 when he was a rookie. The Montreal Canadiens then faced the Presidents' Trophy-winning Boston Bruins in the second round, marking the fourth such matchup of Price's NHL career to date. In contrast to their previous two postseason meetings, the Canadiens upset the Bruins, ousting them in seven games. Following a 4–2 defeat in game 5 at TD Garden, Price shut out the Bruins in game 6 by a score of 4–0 before stopping 29 shots in a 3–1 victory in game 7 to eliminate Boston and advance to the conference finals. His and the Canadiens' run, however, ended against the New York Rangers. In game 1 at the Bell Centre, with the Rangers up 2–0 near the end of the second period, Rangers forward Chris Kreider collided into Price. He would briefly remain in the net, allowing two additional goals before the intermission. Price was then replaced by Budaj in the third period as the Rangers scored three more goals towards a 7–2 final. Days later, it was announced that Price had been ruled out for the rest of the series with an unspecified lower-body injury, the second consecutive year which saw a premature ending to his playoffs due to injury.

==== Hart, Jennings and Vezina Trophies, Stanley Cup Final appearance (2014–2021) ====
Price would have the best season of his career in 2014–15, as he would finish the season as the leader of the three leading categories for goaltenders: GAA (1.96), SV% (.933), and wins (44), all career highs as he would help the Canadiens win the Atlantic Division. He would go on to win the Hart Memorial Trophy as the league's most valuable player in the regular season, the Vezina Trophy as best goaltender, the Ted Lindsay Award as most valuable player as voted by the NHLPA, and the William M. Jennings Trophy for fewest goals allowed (tied with Corey Crawford of the Chicago Blackhawks with 189 goals allowed). He became only the second player in franchise history to win four awards in one season.

Early into the 2015–16 season, Price suffered a knee injury in a game against the New York Rangers on November 25, 2015. While initially expected to return after six weeks, it was later revealed that the extent of Price's injury was a MCL sprain, effectively ending his season outright.

On November 12, 2016, shortly into the 2016–17 season in a game against the Detroit Red Wings, Price would set a record for most consecutive wins to start a season with 10 (later surpassed by Jack Campbell of the Toronto Maple Leafs). He would be named a finalist for the Vezina Trophy for the second time in his career at season's end, with the foregoing honor ultimately going to Sergei Bobrovsky of the Columbus Blue Jackets.

On July 2, 2017, it was announced that Price signed an eight-year contract extension with an annual cap hit of US$10.5 million totaling US$84 million for the entire contract. His new contract will run through the 2025–26 season. This made Price the highest paid goaltender in the 2018–19 season, surpassing New York Rangers goaltender Henrik Lundqvist. After a dismal start to the 2017–18 season, Price left the lineup due to a minor lower body injury, leaving goaltenders Al Montoya and Charlie Lindgren to take his place during his absence. On February 22, 2018, Price was ruled out indefinitely after sustaining a concussion in a game against the Philadelphia Flyers. On March 19, Price returned from his concussion and dressed after missing 13 games for a game against the Florida Panthers. Despite his injuries, he made in his 557th career NHL start for the Canadiens against the Winnipeg Jets on April 3, surpassing the previous franchise record held by Hockey Hall of Fame inductee Jacques Plante.

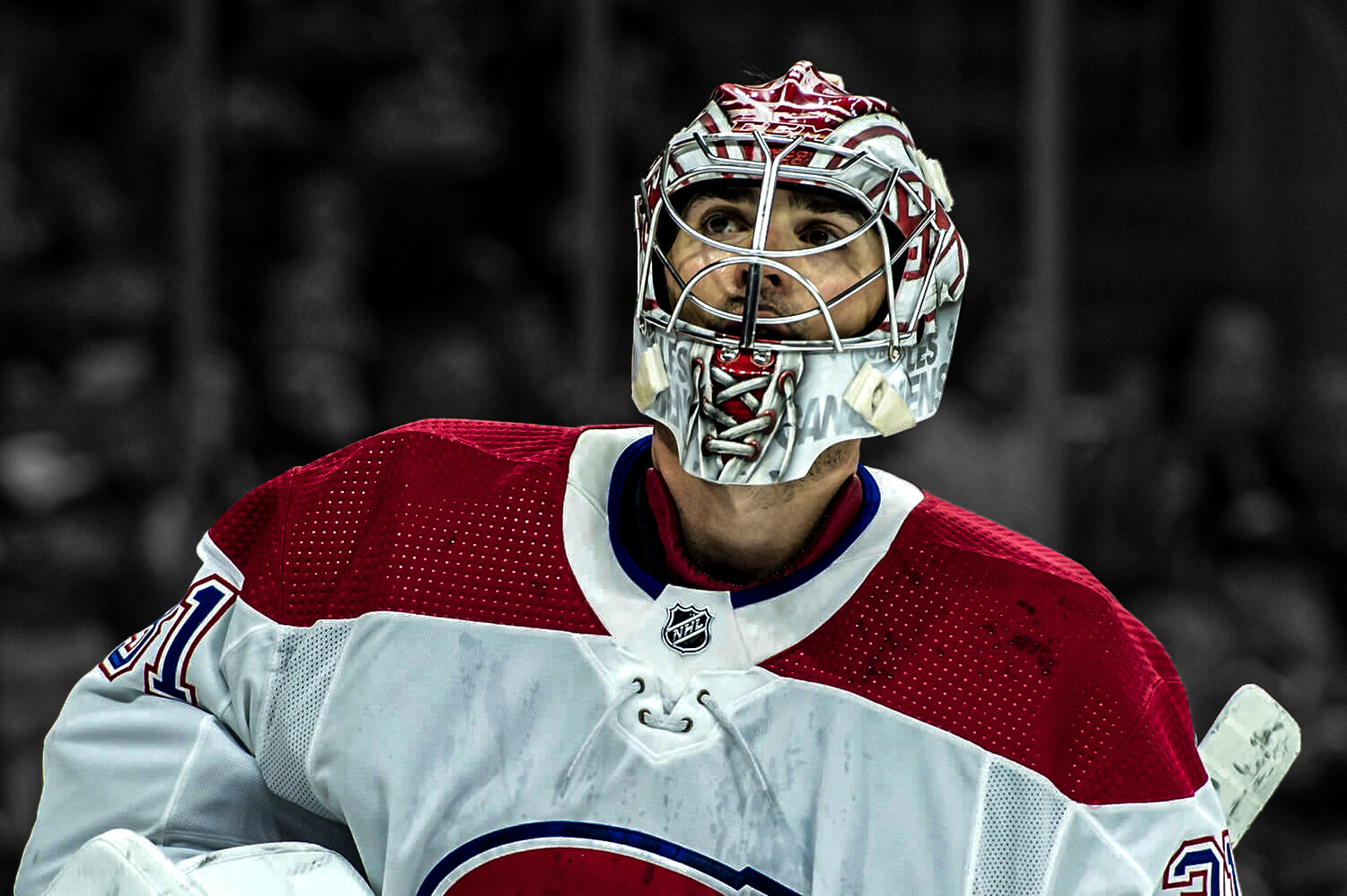
Price with the Canadiens in January 2020

On October 27, 2018, with a 3–0 win over the Boston Bruins, Price surpassed Patrick Roy for second place in Canadiens franchise career wins with his 290th career victory. Price was named to the 2019 National Hockey League All-Star Game, his sixth All-Star nomination, but he chose to defer due to a lower-body injury with Tampa Bay Lightning goaltender Andrei Vasilevskiy filling his spot. On March 12, 2019, with a 3–1 victory over the Detroit Red Wings, Price surpassed Jacques Plante for first place in Canadiens franchise career wins with his 315th. Even though the Canadiens missed the 2019 playoffs by two points, Price had an improved season, with a 35–24–6 record and a .918 SV% in 66 games in 2018–19.

For the 2019–20 season, Price played 58 games in the season, recording a .909 SV% and a 27–25–6 record. Due to the COVID-19 pandemic restrictions in March 2020, however, the regular season ended three weeks early. Price's presence on the Canadiens' lineup became a point of discussion in the media during the NHL's debates on the format for the belated 2020 playoffs, which were to be held in August 2020 in an expanded format that allowed the Canadiens to participate for the first time in three years. The Canadiens were scheduled to play a qualifying round against the Pittsburgh Penguins, and it was reported that the Penguins had objected to the idea of a best-of-three series on the basis that Price's presence and talent gave the Canadiens an unfair advantage relative to their regular season performance. The Penguins publicly denied this subsequently. Ultimately a best-of-five format was chosen instead. The Canadiens defeated the Penguins 3–1 in the qualifying round, with Price recording a .947 SV%. The team went on to lose the first round to the Philadelphia Flyers four games to two.

With pandemic restrictions and effects still in place, the NHL arranged for all teams to play exclusively within realigned divisions for the 2020–21 season, with all Canadian teams playing in the newly formed North Division. Towards the end of the abbreviated season, Price sustained a concussion on April 20, 2021, after a collision with Alex Chiasson of the Edmonton Oilers. As part of his return to the ice, he played a single game with the Canadiens' newfound AHL affiliate, the Laval Rocket, on May 17. Price finished the season with 12 wins, an underwhelming .901 SV% and 2.64 GAA as the Canadiens clinched the final seed in the playoffs. Price would see notable statistical improvements throughout the 2021 playoffs while the Canadiens advanced to their first Stanley Cup Final in 28 years. The Canadiens beat the Toronto Maple Leafs in seven games by overcoming a 3–1 series deficit in round one, then swept the Winnipeg Jets in round two, and finally defeated the Vegas Golden Knights in six games in the semifinals to win the Clarence S. Campbell Bowl. Price was widely cited as the most important player in the Canadiens' deep run to the Stanley Cup Final. When asked about the difference between Price's regular and postseason performances in recent years, team general manager Marc Bergevin remarked "I guess the expression we could use he's a big-game player. He rises to the occasion. He does extremely well under pressure." In the Stanley Cup Final against the defending Stanley Cup champion Tampa Bay Lightning, Price and the Canadiens lost the first three games, but won game 4 at home by a score of 3–2 in overtime to avoid getting swept. Price made 32 saves in the win and then 29 saves in game 5, which the Canadiens lost 1–0 for a 4–1 series loss with Lightning rookie forward Ross Colton scoring the lone goal of game 5 at Amalie Arena as the Lightning won their second-consecutive Stanley Cup title.

==== Later years, Masterton Trophy and health struggles (2021–present) ====
With the arrival of the Seattle Kraken as the NHL's 32nd team, the 2021 NHL expansion draft was scheduled. As each team was only allowed to protect one goaltender and Price had a contractual guarantee of protection in such situations, it was widely assumed that the Kraken would select Price's backup Jake Allen based on his strong performance in the previous season and economical contract. Price proposed to waive his no-movement clause so the Canadiens could instead protect Allen, with the team calculating that the Kraken would opt not to take Price's contract due to its cap hit and duration. Ultimately, the Kraken declined the opportunity to select Price, and selected defenceman Cale Fleury from the Canadiens instead. The Athletic remarked afterward that "now that Seattle has taken a pass, the reality that Price will play his entire career in a Canadiens uniform seems impossible to refute."

Price underwent surgery for a torn meniscus in July 2021. When doctors opened up his knee, they discovered the cartilage on his femur was almost completely gone due to a combination of ordinary wear and tear and repeated trauma, resulting in that joint being almost bone-on-bone. Despite this, Price was initially expected to be ready to begin the season on October 13. However, on October 7, it was announced by the Canadiens that Price would be entering the NHL/NHLPA Player Assistance Program, established to help NHL players and their families deal with substance abuse, mental health, and other personal challenges. On November 9, Price rejoined his Canadiens teammates and went on to release a statement explaining his leave, revealing that he decided to enter a residential treatment facility for substance abuse following "years of neglecting [his] own mental health".

Earlier, Price's doctors in Pittsburgh suggested an osteochondral autograft transfer which would have moved cartilage and bone from the healthy part of the knee to the injured portion. However, Price balked, since the surgery would have required lengthy rehabilitation that would have shut him down for the entire season and potentially hindered his outdoors lifestyle away from the ice. Instead, following his departure from the player assistance program, Price embarked on an extended rehabilitation of his knee, a process that lasted months past what was initially expected and involved multiple setbacks. In his absence, the Canadiens, plagued by injuries to other players, fell to the bottom of the league standings. Team owner Geoff Molson sacked general manager Bergevin, and subsequently coach Dominique Ducharme was removed as well, replaced by Martin St. Louis, a former teammate of Price's on the 2014 Canadian Olympic team. Price later said that he tried "three or four times" to get ready to return, only for the knee to swell up so much that it was impossible for him to play at his normal level.

In early April, it was announced that Price would travel with the team to away games against New Jersey and Toronto, but would not play in either. After days of speculation, it was confirmed that he would make his first start on April 15 against the New York Islanders, the Canadiens' 75th game of the 2021–22 season. In his return, he gave up two goals on 20 shots in a 3–0 loss to the Islanders. After three additional games, Price consulted with his New York-based specialist on continued knee inflammation, but said "there were no real questions answered for me." He returned to the net for the Canadiens' final game of the season, a 10–2 rout of the Florida Panthers for his only win of the season. Price indicated that he would seek further answers over the summer. Addressing the possibility that the season-ender was his final game with the team, he said "If it is it, that would be a great way to do it." Price was named a finalist for the Bill Masterton Memorial Trophy, awarded to the player who "best exemplifies the qualities of perseverance, sportsmanship and dedication to hockey." After receiving same, he observed "there's obstacles in life that will always challenge you, and I think having the ability to overcome those and keep things in perspective and keep moving forward is something that we should all be teaching our children and loved ones."

On August 18, 2022, Canadiens general manager Kent Hughes announced that Price was unlikely to play during the 2022–23 season and that if he were to return at all, it would likely require additional surgery. Price later disclosed in an interview with The Athletic that the contemplated procedure was still an OAT transfer, but the odds of success were too low for him to consider it, given the risk to his day-to-day life were it not to succeed. Even if he had pursued the surgery, it would have been intended mainly to give Price something approaching a pain-free life, not to resume active play.

In April 2023, Price's spouse hinted at his retirement, stating their family was selling their longtime home on Montreal's South Shore and permanently moving to Kelowna, British Columbia at the end of the school year. Although Price himself wished he could return for the 2023–24 season, he realized that it would take a "miracle" to do so. Subsequently, The Athletic reported a few months later that Price had not only ruled out returning for the upcoming season, but concluded his hockey career was over even though he was still under active contract until the end of the 2025-26 season. He told The Athletic that his knee swells up under even minimal strain and cannot withstand the workload of a full hockey season. His priority therefore has shifted to maintaining his quality of life, and he accepted that "he will never play professional hockey again."

Prior to the beginning of the 2025–26 season, Price's contractual rights, along with a 2026 fifth-round pick, were traded to the San Jose Sharks in exchange for defenceman Gannon Laroque on September 5, 2025. However, this was merely a salary cap move, and it was understood by then that Price would never play again. After the season, he was inducted into the Hockey Hall of Fame. While his contract had just expired at the end of the season, he was in his second year of eligibility; he had not played a meaningful game since 2022 and had been on long-term injured reserve since then. The Sharks congratulated him on his induction, even though he had never suited up for them.

== International play ==
Medal record

Men's ice hockey

Representing Canada

Canada Cup / World Cup
Gold medal – first place	2016 Toronto	

Winter Olympics
Gold medal – first place	2014 Sochi	

World Junior Championships
Gold medal – first place	2007 Sweden	

World U18 Championships
Silver medal – second place	2005 Czech Republic	

U-18 Junior World Cup
Gold medal – first place	2004 Czech Republic/Slovakia	

World U-17 Hockey Challenge
Silver medal – second place	2004 Newfoundland and Labrador	

Price made his international debut for Hockey Canada as part of Canada Pacific at the 2004 World U-17 Hockey Challenge earning a silver medal. Thereafter, he participated with the Canadian national under-18 team at the 2004 U-18 Junior World Cup and 2005 World U18 Championships winning gold and silver respectively. In his final year of major junior, Price was named to the Canadian national junior team for the 2007 World Junior Championships in Sweden. He led Canada to a third consecutive gold medal and was named both Tournament MVP and Best Goaltender after going 6–0 with two shutouts, a 1.14 GAA, and .961 SV%. He was likewise named to the media All-Star team along with fellow countrymen Jonathan Toews and Kris Letang.

On January 3, 2014, Price was named to the 2014 Canadian Olympic team joining both Mike Smith of the Phoenix Coyotes and Roberto Luongo of the Vancouver Canucks as team goaltenders. With this, Price, along with close friend and teammate P. K. Subban, became the first Montreal Canadiens player to be selected for the national senior team since Mark Recchi in the 1998 Nagano Olympics. Soon after arriving in Sochi, it was announced that Price would start in Canada's first game of the tournament versus Norway. Stopping 18 of 19 shots against the foregoing in a 3–1 Canadian win, Price's strong play continued, allowing only a single goal in a 2–1 overtime victory against Finland to conclude round-robin play. In the ensuing quarterfinals, Price backstopped his country over Latvia by a final score of 2–1. On February 21, he played a pivotal role in a 1–0 victory against Team USA, stopping all 31 shots with a shutout performance, powering Team Canada into the gold medal game. Recording his second consecutive shutout, Price made 24 saves in a 3–0 victory against Sweden, securing his first gold medal as an Olympian. After going undefeated over the course of five games with a 0.59 GAA and .971 SV%, he was named as the tournament's best goaltender by the International Ice Hockey Federation (IIHF).

Prior to the beginning of the 2016–17 NHL season, Price participated in the 2016 World Cup of Hockey winning a gold medal along with Team Canada. For his part, he posted a 5-0-0 record, along with a 1.40 GAA, and .957 SV%.

== Playing style ==
Like many modern goaltenders, Price utilized the "butterfly hybrid" technique, a mix of "stand-up" and "butterfly style" goaltending. As such, Price remained on his feet for high shots, and dropped to his knees, pointing his skates outwards with his pads covering the bottom width of the net for low shots. Price was lauded by his teammates and opponents alike for his exceptionally calm demeanor on the ice, with 2014 Olympic teammate and Los Angeles Kings defenseman Drew Doughty calling Price "probably the calmest goalie [he] played in front of". His methodical and calm approach to the play often allowed him to make difficult saves look mundane and routine. Considered by both Canadiens' management and coaches to be one of its team leaders, Price was often present during meetings with the team's captain and alternate captains respectively.

== Philanthropy ==
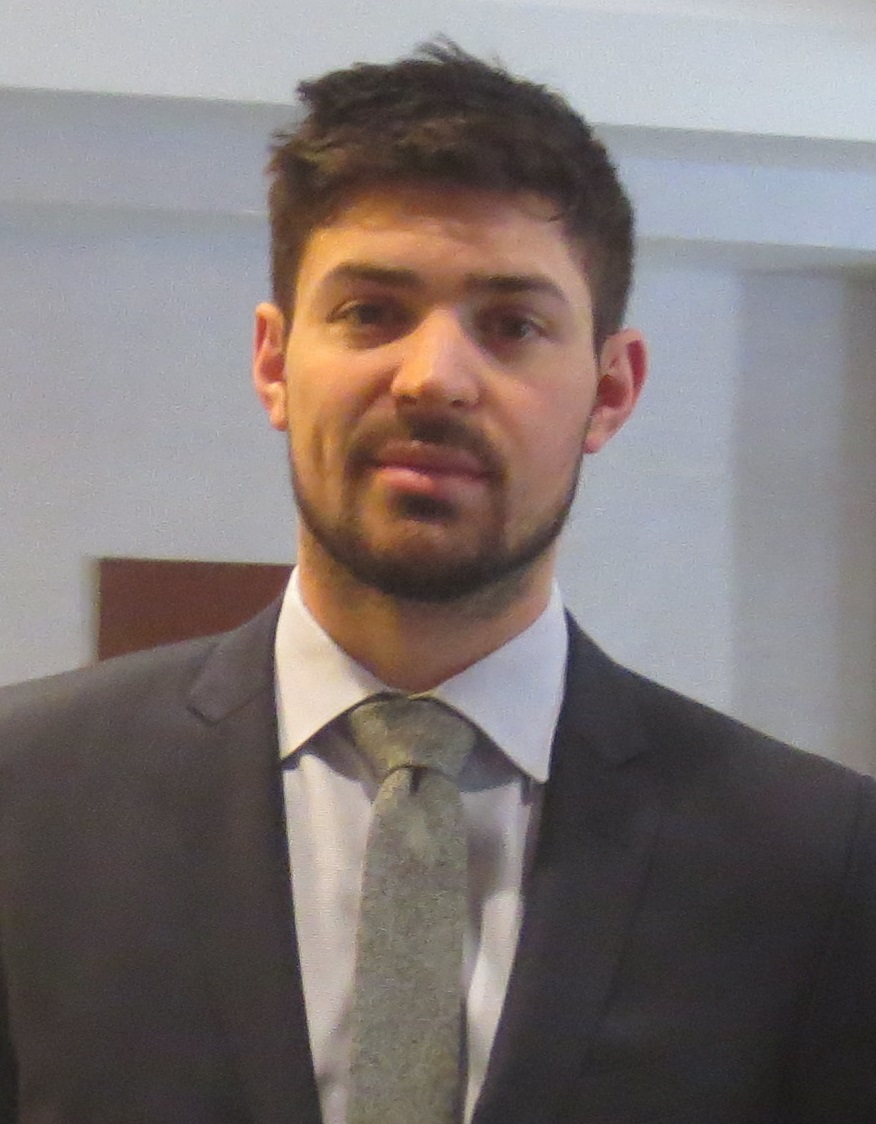
Price in April 2015

In October 2015, Price teamed up with CCM to donate $10,000 worth of equipment to a minor hockey league in Williams Lake, B.C. Since 2014, Price has been an ambassador to the Breakfast Club of Canada which aims to provide all children across Canada with nutritious meals.

In June 2019, during the annual NHL Awards ceremony, Price, together with American model Camille Kostek, presented hockey fan Anderson Whitehead the Feel Good Moment Award. Whitehead's mother always wanted her son to meet the goaltender but was not able to arrange it before she died from breast cancer in November 2018.

== Personal life ==
From his maternal grandparents, Price has Norwegian Canadian heritage and is a member of Ulkatcho First Nation, and has Nuxalk and Southern Carrier heritage. In 2010, he was named as an honorary co-chair for that year's National Aboriginal Hockey Championships held in Ottawa, Ontario.

Price met his wife, Angela (née Webber), while playing major junior hockey with the Tri-City Americans; the couple had been initially set up on a blind date by her friend who was dating Carey's roommate at the time. They were married in Benton City, Washington near Angela's hometown of Kennewick in August 2013. The next day, Price flew to Calgary for Hockey Canada's Olympic orientation camp for the 2014 Sochi Olympics. On October 21, 2015, Angela Price stated on her blog that they were expecting their first child the following spring. In May 2016, Angela gave birth to the couple's first child, a girl named Liv. In December 2018, Angela gave birth to their second daughter, Millie. In June 2020, it was announced they were expecting their third child. That October, the Price family welcomed a boy named Lincoln.

Price is the brother-in-law of former Canadiens teammate Yannick Weber, who married Price's younger sister, Kayla, in July 2022. The couple originally met at the 2014 Sochi Olympics, where Weber represented Switzerland and she was present to see her brother play for Canada.

In an October 2022 exclusive interview with sports journalist Arpon Basu as part of a series that ranked 100 players in modern NHL history (with Price ranking 88th), Price opened up about his struggles a year prior which led to his admission to the National Hockey League Players' Association (NHLPA) Player Assistance Program. It was revealed that he dealt with alcoholism, initially turning to substance abuse as an escape from the stresses of being a professional athlete which would be further exacerbated following the Canadiens' loss in the 2021 Stanley Cup Final and complications surrounding his subsequent knee surgery paired with strict Canadian restrictions surrounding the COVID-19 pandemic. Personally citing the severity of the foregoing disease within the Indigenous community and upon reflections on his being, Price decided in October 2021 to voluntarily enter a residential rehabilitation facility in hopes that his willingness to talk about his experience could serve as an example and inspire other individuals that "it's OK to ask for help."

Price is an avid outdoorsman and often camps and hunts in his free time. In December 2022, Price released a statement opposing a proposed Canadian Federal Bill which would amend gun control legislation. Price later apologized to the victims of the École Polytechnique massacre for the timing of his comments, which came three days before the 33rd anniversary of the attack.

On May 31, 2024, Price received an honorary law degree from the University of Northern British Columbia (UNBC) in recognition of his inspiration provided to Indigenous youth as well as continued philanthropy work in both Northern British Columbia and Canada.

== Career statistics ==
=== Regular season and playoffs ===
Bold indicates league leader
* indicates franchise record

			Regular season									Playoffs
Season	Team	League	GP	W	L	T/OT	MIN	GA	SO	GAA	SV%	GP	W	L	MIN	GA	SO	GAA	SV%
2002–03	Quesnel Millionaires	BCHL	18	—	—	—	—	—	—	2.70	—	—	—	—	—	—	—	—	—
2002–03	Tri-City Americans	WHL	1	0	0	0	20	2	0	6.00	.857	—	—	—	—	—	—	—	—
2003–04	Tri-City Americans	WHL	28	8	9	3	1,363	54	1	2.38	.915	8	5	3	470	19	0	2.43	.906
2004–05	Tri-City Americans	WHL	63	24	31	8	3,712	145	8	2.34	.920	5	1	4	325	12	0	2.22	.937
2005–06	Tri-City Americans	WHL	55	21	25	6	3,072	147	3	2.87	.906	5	1	4	302	12	0	2.39	.896
2006–07	Tri-City Americans	WHL	46	30	13	1	2,722	111	3	2.45	.917	6	2	4	348	17	0	2.93	.911
2006–07	Hamilton Bulldogs	AHL	2	1	1	0	117	3	0	1.53	.949	22	15	6	1,314	45	2	2.06	.936
2007–08	Hamilton Bulldogs	AHL	10	6	4	0	581	26	1	2.69	.896	—	—	—	—	—	—	—	—
2007–08	Montreal Canadiens	NHL	41	24	12	3	2,413	103	3	2.56	.920	11	5	6	648	30	2	2.78	.901
2008–09	Montreal Canadiens	NHL	52	23	16	10	3,036	143	1	2.83	.905	4	0	4	219	15	0	4.11	.878
2009–10	Montreal Canadiens	NHL	41	13	20	5	2,358	109	0	2.77	.912	4	0	1	135	8	0	3.56	.890
2010–11	Montreal Canadiens	NHL	72*	38	28	6	4,206*	165	8	2.35	.923	7	3	4	455	16	1	2.11	.934
2011–12	Montreal Canadiens	NHL	65	26	28	11	3,944	160	4	2.43	.916	—	—	—	—	—	—	—	—
2012–13	Montreal Canadiens	NHL	39	21	13	4	2,249	97	3	2.59	.905	4	1	2	239	13	0	3.26	.894
2013–14	Montreal Canadiens	NHL	59	34	20	5	3,464	134	6	2.32	.927	12	8	4	739	29	1	2.35	.919
2014–15	Montreal Canadiens	NHL	66	**44***	16	6	3,977	130	9	**1.96**	**.933***	12	6	6	752	28	1	2.23	.920
2015–16	Montreal Canadiens	NHL	12	10	2	0	699	24	2	2.06	.934	—	—	—	—	—	—	—	—
2016–17	Montreal Canadiens	NHL	62	37	20	5	3,709	138	3	2.23	.923	6	2	4	388	12	0	1.86	.933
2017–18	Montreal Canadiens	NHL	49	16	26	7	2,855	148	1	3.11	.900	—	—	—	—	—	—	—	—
2018–19	Montreal Canadiens	NHL	66	35	24	6	3,881	161	4	2.49	.918	—	—	—	—	—	—	—	—
2019–20	Montreal Canadiens	NHL	58	27	25	6	3,440	160	4	2.79	.909	10	5	5	606	18	2	1.78	.936
2020–21	Montreal Canadiens	NHL	25	12	7	5	1,479	65	1	2.64	.901	22	13	9	1,342	51	1	2.28	.924
2020–21	Laval Rocket	AHL	1	0	1	0	39	2	0	3.03	.867	—	—	—	—	—	—	—	—
2021–22	Montreal Canadiens	NHL	5	1	4	0	298	18	0	3.63	.878	—	—	—	—	—	—	—	—
NHL totals			712	361	261	79	42,006	1,755	49	2.51	.917	92	43	45	5,522	220	8	2.39	.919

=== International ===
Year	Team	Event	Result	GP	W	L	OT	MIN	GA	SO	GAA	SV%
2004	Canada Pacific	U17	2nd place, silver medalist(s)	—	—	—	—	—	—	—	—	—
2004	Canada	JWC18	1st place, gold medalist(s)	4	4	0	0	239	5	1	1.26	.940
2005	Canada	U18	2nd place, silver medalist(s)	4	2	2	0	249	11	0	2.65	.894
2007	Canada	WJC	1st place, gold medalist(s)	6	6	0	0	370	7	2	1.14	.961
2014	Canada	OG	1st place, gold medalist(s)	5	5	0	0	303	3	2	0.59	.972
2016	Canada	WCH	1st place, gold medalist(s)	5	5	0	0	300	7	1	1.40	.957
Junior totals				14	12	2	0	858	23	3	1.61	—
Senior totals				10	10	0	0	603	10	3	0.99	—

== Awards and honours ==
Award	Year	Ref
NHL
NHL Rookie of the Month	March 2008	
NHL All-Rookie Team	2008	
NHL YoungStars Game	2009	
NHL All-Star Game	2009, 2011, 2012, 2015, 2017, 2018, 2019	
NHL Second Star of the Month	November 2010, February 2015, October 2015	
Hart Memorial Trophy	2015	
Ted Lindsay Award	2015	
Vezina Trophy	2015	
William M. Jennings Trophy	2015	
NHL First All-Star Team	2015	
Bill Masterton Memorial Trophy	2022	
NHL Quarter-Century Team	2025	
CHL
CHL/NHL Top Prospects Game	2005	
CHL Canada/Russia Series	2005, 2006	
CHL Goaltender of the Year Award	2007	
WHL
WHL West First All-Star Team	2007	
Del Wilson Trophy	2007	
AHL
Calder Cup champion	2007	
Jack A. Butterfield Trophy	2007	
International
World Junior Championship Best Goaltender	2007	
World Junior Championship Media All-Star Team	2007	
World Junior Championship MVP	2007	
Winter Olympics Best Goaltender	2014	
National
Lou Marsh Trophy	2015	
Lionel Conacher Award	2015	
Indspire Sports Award	2016	
Montreal Canadiens
Molson Cup	2009, 2011, 2012, 2013, 2014, 2015, 2017, 2019, 2020	

== See also ==
- List of NHL goaltenders with 300 wins

Preceded by Kyle Chipchura	Montreal Canadiens first-round draft pick 2005	Succeeded by David Fischer
Awards and achievements
Preceded by Sidney Crosby	Hart Memorial Trophy; 2015	Succeeded by Patrick Kane
Preceded by Tuukka Rask	Vezina Trophy; 2015	Succeeded by Braden Holtby
Preceded by Sidney Crosby	Ted Lindsay Award; 2015	Succeeded by Patrick Kane
Preceded by Jonathan Quick	William M. Jennings Trophy; 2015; With: Corey Crawford (tie)	Succeeded by Frederik Andersen; John Gibson
Preceded by Oskar Lindblom	Bill Masterton Memorial Trophy; 2022	Succeeded by Kris Letang
