= Ryan O'Byrne =

Canadian ice hockey player (born 1984)

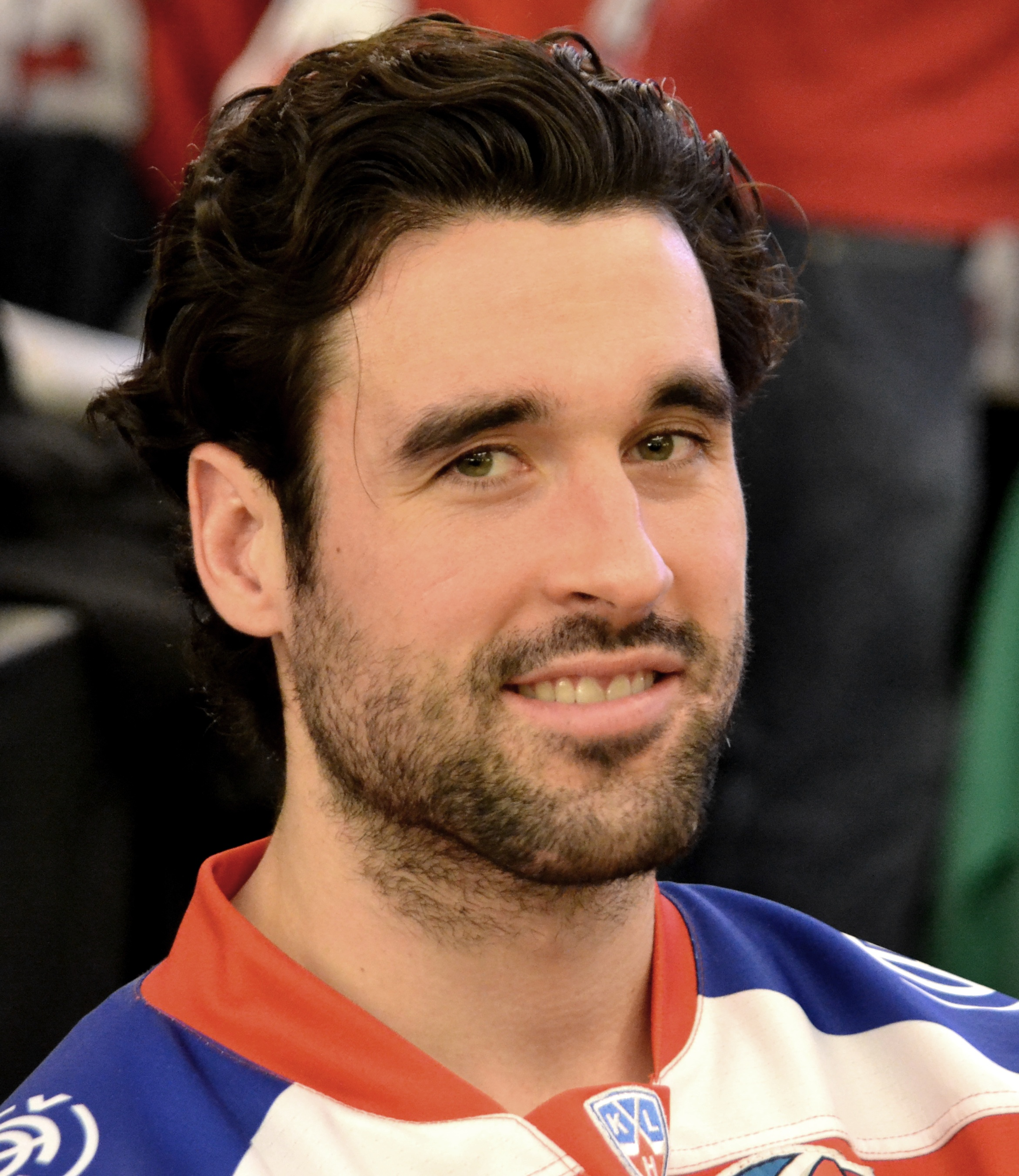
- O'Byrne in December 2013
- Born: July 19, 1984 (age 42) Victoria, British Columbia, Canada
- Height: 6 ft 5 in (196 cm)
- Weight: 234 lb (106 kg; 16 st 10 lb)
- Position: Defence
- Shot: Right
- Played for: Montreal Canadiens; Colorado Avalanche; Toronto Maple Leafs; HC Lev Praha; HC Ambrì-Piotta; HV71
- NHL draft: 79th overall, 2003; Montreal Canadiens
- Playing career: 2006–2016

Ryan David O'Byrne (born July 19, 1984) is a Canadian former professional ice hockey player who played in the National Hockey League (NHL) from 2007 to 2013 with the Montreal Canadiens, Colorado Avalanche and the Toronto Maple Leafs. During this time, O'Byrne founded the Ryan O'Byrne Charity Camp, a non-profit hockey camp for youth. At the conclusion of the 2012–13 season, O'Byrne went on to play in the Kontinental Hockey League (KHL), Swiss National League (NL), and Swedish Hockey League, before retiring from a ten-year professional hockey career in 2016.

After returning to Cornell University to complete his undergraduate degree, O'Byrne earned his MBA from the Kellogg School of Management at Northwestern University. Staying close to sport and wellness, he worked as a Brand Manager at Gatorade before joining digital physical therapy startup SWORD Health.

== Playing career ==
=== Amateur ===
O'Byrne was born and raised in Victoria, British Columbia and attended St. Michaels University School. After playing two seasons of junior in the BCHL with the Victoria Salsa and Nanaimo Clippers, O'Byrne opted to play U.S. collegiate hockey at Cornell University.

Prior to his freshman year at Cornell, Ryan was drafted in the third round, 79th-overall, by the Montreal Canadiens in the 2003 NHL entry draft. In his sophomore season of 2004–05, O'Byrne helped Cornell regain the ECAC Championship with a 3–1 win over Harvard before losing in the West Regional Final to the University of Minnesota.

In his junior year, O'Byrne entrenched himself as a top defender within Cornell's ECAC leading defence corps to be selected as a First Team All-Ivy player. Despite missing nearly a month to injury, O'Byrne led all Big Red defenceman with 7 goals and 13 points in 28 games and was named in the All-ECAC Third-Team. O'Byrne was selected by Cornell Coach Mike Schäfer as an alternate captain, but decided to forgo his senior year to begin his professional career signing a two-year contract with the Montreal Canadiens on August 9, 2006.

=== Professional ===
O'Byrne played 308 regular season and 25 playoff games in the NHL for the Montreal Canadiens, Colorado Avalanche, and Toronto Maple Leafs.

After attending his first Montreal training camp, O'Byrne was assigned to American Hockey League affiliate, the Hamilton Bulldogs, for the 2006–07 season. As a stay-at-home defensive-defenseman, Ryan produced 12 assists in 80 regular-season games with the Bulldogs. During the playoffs, he scored his first professional goal, which clinched the series over the Rochester Americans, advancing the Bulldogs to the Conference Semi-finals. In the Championship Final, he then produced his second game-winning goal a game three win over the Hershey Bears en route to claiming the Calder Cup.

In the following 2007–08 season, O'Byrne made his NHL debut, recording two assists, in a 4–2 victory over the Boston Bruins on December 6, 2007. Ryan missed a month of the season after suffering a broken thumb, before returning to health and scoring his first NHL goal in a 6–4 defeat to the San Jose Sharks on March 4, 2008. He finished the season, while splitting time between Hamilton and Montreal, to finish with 33 games.

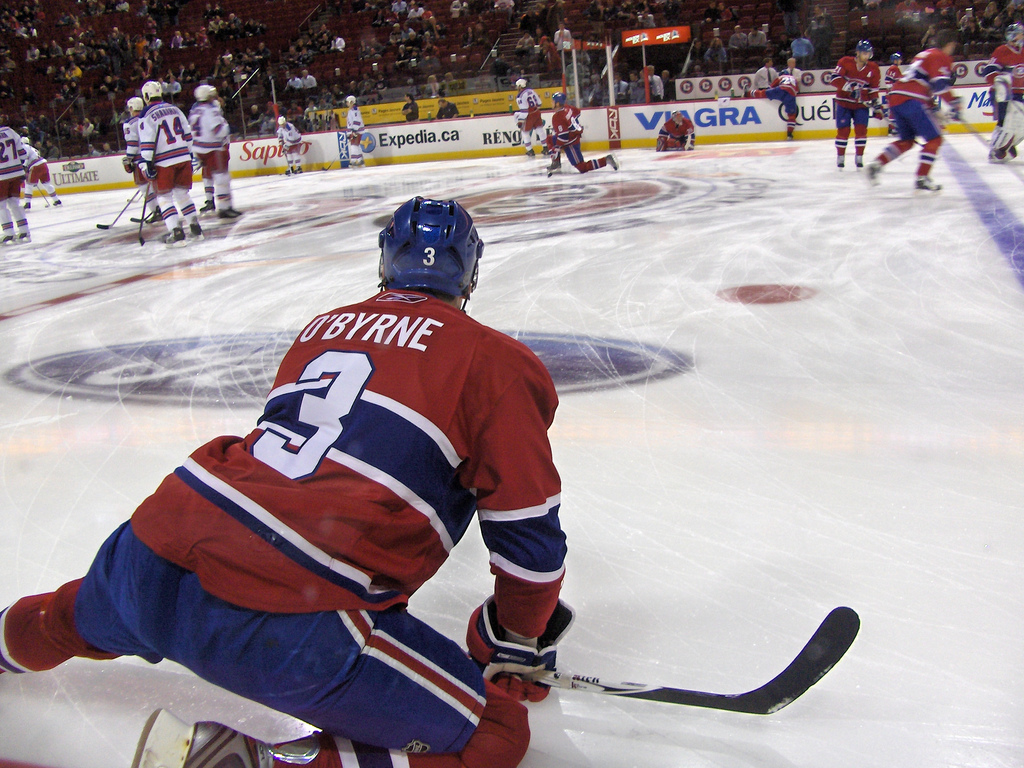
O'Byrne during his tenure with the Montreal Canadiens in March 2009.

O'Byrne was then re-signed to a three-year contract with the Canadiens on July 16, 2008. He made the Canadiens opening night roster for the 2008–09 season, appearing in 37 games for five assists, with two stints in the AHL.

In his second game of the 2009–10 campaign with the Canadiens, Ryan suffered a knee injury causing him to miss 20 games. Upon his return, O'Byrne established himself as a regular within the defence corps. On December 4, 2009, he changed his jersey number to 20 due to retiring of the number 3 in honour of Emile Bouchard for the Canadiens Centennial celebrations. Similar to Ray Bourque's homage to Phil Esposito in Boston, Ryan wore the number 20 jersey underneath his number 3 jersey and as a surprise, unveiled his new number during the banner hanging and presented Bouchard his jersey as a token of being the last to wear the number 3 for the Canadiens. O'Byrne finished his first full NHL season, appearing in a career high 55 games and 13 post-season games as the Canadiens reached the Eastern Conference finals.

To begin the 2010–11 season, O'Byrne was a depth defenceman on the team's blueline. In the final year of his contract he was traded by the Canadiens to the Colorado Avalanche for forward prospect Michael Bournival on November 11, 2010. In his first game with the Avalanche, O'Byrne recorded a career high in ice time in a 5–1 win over the Columbus Blue Jackets on November 12. On December 15, in a 4–3 win over the Chicago Blackhawks, O'Byrne was the subject of a controversial hit on Blackhawks’ winger Viktor Stålberg, resulting in a concussion for the latter. O'Byrne was given a two minute minor penalty from the play but was not disciplined by the league.

During the 2012–13 NHL lockout, O'Byrne served as an assistant coach for the Victoria Grizzlies of the BCHL as a coach, but left the position to join the Florida Everblades of the ECHL to get some ice time and effectively work in his position as the NHLPA's representative for the Avalanche. He rejoined the Avalanche at the conclusion of the lockout.

In the midst of the shortened 2012–13 season and in the final year of his contract at the trade deadline, O'Byrne was dealt by the Avalanche to the Toronto Maple Leafs in exchange for a fourth-round pick in the 2014 NHL entry draft on April 3, 2013. On April 8, 2013, O'Byrne scored his first goal as a Maple Leaf.

His last NHL game was the Leafs-Bruins Game 7 on May 13, 2013, in which the Leafs surrendered a 4–1 lead in the third period, and they would go on to lose 5–4 in overtime to lose the series in seven.

After experiencing a first round defeat to the Boston Bruins with the Leafs, O'Byrne was released to free agency. O'Byrne agreed to his first contract abroad, signing a two-year contract with Czech-based HC Lev Praha of the Kontinental Hockey League on September 2, 2013. In the 2013–14 season, O'Byrne enjoyed a largely successful season in Prague as a mainstay stay-at-home defenseman. In 43 games he contributed with 2 goals and 9 points before helping Lev Praha advance to the Gagarin Cup finals in the playoffs.

O'Byrne's intention to fulfill the second year of his contract was terminated as Lev Praha declared bankruptcy and folded immediately in the off-season. On July 7, 2014, he opted to remain in Europe but moved to Switzerland in signing a one-year contract with HC Ambrì-Piotta of the National League A. After one season with Ambri, O'Byrne moved as a free agent to the Swedish Hockey League, signing a two-year deal with HV71 on July 30, 2015.

On July 21, 2016, O'Byrne announced his retirement from professional hockey to attend the Kellogg School of Management.

== Ryan O'Byrne Charity Camp ==
While playing professionally, O’Byrne founded and ran the Ryan O'Byrne Charity Camp (ROCC), an annual five-day hockey camp for 60 children aged 9–12 years in Victoria, BC. All proceeds from the camp were donated to KidSport Victoria, an organization that helps unprivileged children enroll in sport. The camp also included the Lorelei O'Byrne Awards, named in memory of Ryan's mom, in which a pair of recipients based on passion for sport and financial need attended the camp at no charge. Several other NHLers from the area — including Tyson Barrie, Jamie Benn, Matt Irwin, Manny Malhotra, Paul Bissonnette and Boyd Gordon — also volunteered at O'Byrne's annual camp.

== Post career ==
After retiring in 2016, O'Byrne returned to Cornell University to complete his undergraduate degree and graduated in January 2017. After completing his undergrad degree, O'Byrne earned his Master of Business Administration (MBA) from the Kellogg School of Management at Northwestern University. After graduation, O'Byrne worked in marketing at Gatorade in Chicago.

== Career statistics ==
			Regular season					Playoffs
Season	Team	League	GP	G	A	Pts	PIM	GP	G	A	Pts	PIM
2000–01	Victoria Salsa	BCHL	1	0	0	0	0	—	—	—	—	—
2001–02	Peninsula Panthers	VIJHL	41	4	16	20	42	—	—	—	—	—
2001–02	Victoria Salsa	BCHL	52	2	9	11	91	—	—	—	—	—
2002–03	Victoria Salsa	BCHL	32	3	6	9	94	—	—	—	—	—
2002–03	Nanaimo Clippers	BCHL	9	2	4	6	24	—	—	—	—	—
2003–04	Cornell University	ECAC	31	0	2	2	71	—	—	—	—	—
2004–05	Cornell University	ECAC	33	3	7	10	68	—	—	—	—	—
2005–06	Cornell University	ECAC	28	7	6	13	69	—	—	—	—	—
2006–07	Hamilton Bulldogs	AHL	80	0	12	12	129	22	2	5	7	32
2007–08	Hamilton Bulldogs	AHL	20	2	6	8	49	—	—	—	—	—
2007–08	Montreal Canadiens	NHL	33	1	6	7	45	4	0	0	0	0
2008–09	Montreal Canadiens	NHL	37	0	5	5	38	2	0	0	0	2
2008–09	Hamilton Bulldogs	AHL	18	1	5	6	35	—	—	—	—	—
2009–10	Montreal Canadiens	NHL	55	1	3	4	74	13	0	0	0	10
2010–11	Montreal Canadiens	NHL	3	0	0	0	4	—	—	—	—	—
2010–11	Colorado Avalanche	NHL	64	0	10	10	71	—	—	—	—	—
2011–12	Colorado Avalanche	NHL	74	1	6	7	57	—	—	—	—	—
2012–13	Florida Everblades	ECHL	16	2	9	11	10	—	—	—	—	—
2012–13	Colorado Avalanche	NHL	34	1	3	4	54	—	—	—	—	—
2012–13	Toronto Maple Leafs	NHL	8	1	1	2	6	6	0	0	0	4
2013–14	HC Lev Praha	KHL	43	2	7	9	51	22	2	4	6	60
2014–15	HC Ambrì–Piotta	NLA	13	0	2	2	16	—	—	—	—	—
2015–16	HV71	SHL	28	2	3	5	78	3	0	0	0	0
NHL totals			308	5	34	39	369	25	0	0	0	16

== Awards and honours ==
Award	Year
Calder Cup	2007
All-ECAC Hockey Third Team	2005–06
ECAC Hockey All-Tournament Team	2006
