= List of Montreal Canadiens records =

This is a list of franchise records for the Montreal Canadiens of the National Hockey League.

== Team records ==
=== Single season ===
Most points	132	1976–77
Most wins	60	1976–77
Most losses	49	2021–22
Most ties	23	1962–63
Most overtime losses	16	2011–12
Most goals for	387	1976–77
Most goals against	319	2021–22
Fewest points	55	2021–22
Fewest wins	22	2021–22
Fewest losses	8	1976–77
Fewest ties	5	1983–84
Fewest goals for	155	1952–53
Fewest goals against	131	1955–56
Most penalty minutes	1,847	1995–96
Most shutouts	22	1928–29

=== Single game ===
Most goals	16	March 3, 1920
Most goals against	11	6 times
Biggest comeback	5	vs New York Rangers (February 19, 2008; after trailing 0–5 halfway into the game, the Canadiens scored five goals in regulation time, and won 6–5 in a shootout after overtime.)

=== Streaks ===
Winning streaks
Overall	12	January 1, 1968 - February 3, 1968
Home	13	November 2, 1943 - January 8, 1944, January 30, 1977 - March 26, 1977
Away	8	December 18, 1977 - January 18, 1978, January 21, 1982 - February 21, 1982
Losing streaks
Overall	12	February 13, 1926 - March 13, 1926
Home	7	December 16, 1939 - January 18, 1940, October 28, 2000 - November 25, 2000
Away	10	January 16, 1926 - March 13, 1926
Undefeated streaks
Overall	28	December 18, 1977 - February 23, 1978 (23W, 5T)
Home	34	November 1, 1976 - April 2, 1977 (28W, 6T)
Away	23	November 27, 1974 - March 12, 1975 (14W, 9T)
Winless streaks
Overall	12	February 13, 1926 - March 13, 1926 (12L), November 28, 1935 - December 29, 1935 (8L, 4T)
Home	15	December 16, 1939 - March 7, 1940 (12L, 3T)
Away	12	November 26, 1933 - January 28, 1934 (8L, 4T), October 20, 1951 - December 13, 1951 (8L, 4T)

== Individual records ==
=== Career ===
Most seasons	20	Henri Richard
Most games	1256	Henri Richard
Most goals	544	Maurice Richard
Most assists	728	Guy Lafleur
Most points	1246	Guy Lafleur (518 G, 728 A)
Most penalty minutes	2,248	Chris Nilan
Most wins	361	Carey Price
Most shutouts	75	George Hainsworth
Most consecutive games played	560	Doug Jarvis
Most Stanley Cups	17	Jean Beliveau (10 as a player) (7 as an office executive)

=== Season ===
Most goals	60	Steve Shutt (1976–77), Guy Lafleur (1977–78)
Most assists	82	Pete Mahovlich (1974–75)
Most points	136	Guy Lafleur (1976–77, 56 G, 80 A)
Most penalty minutes	358	Chris Nilan (1984–85)
Most points (defenceman)	85	Larry Robinson (1976–77, 19 G, 66 A)
Most points (rookie)	71	Mats Naslund (1982–83, 26 G, 45 A), Kjell Dahlin (1985–86, 32 G, 39 A)
Most shutouts	22¹	George Hainsworth (1928–29)

=== Single game ===
Most goals	6	Newsy Lalonde (January 10, 1920)
Most assists	6	Elmer Lach (February 6, 1943)
Most points	8	Maurice Richard (December 28, 1944, 5 G, 3 A), Bert Olmstead (January 9, 1954, 4 G, 4 A)
Most saves (playoff game)	60	Patrick Roy (April 25, 1994)

¹ NHL record
² Minimum 70-game schedule

== See also ==
- List of Montreal Canadiens players
- List of NHL statistical leaders
- List of NHL players

== Notes and references ==
- Source: NHL Official Guide & Record Book
