= Andrei Markov (ice hockey) =

Russian-Canadian ice hockey player

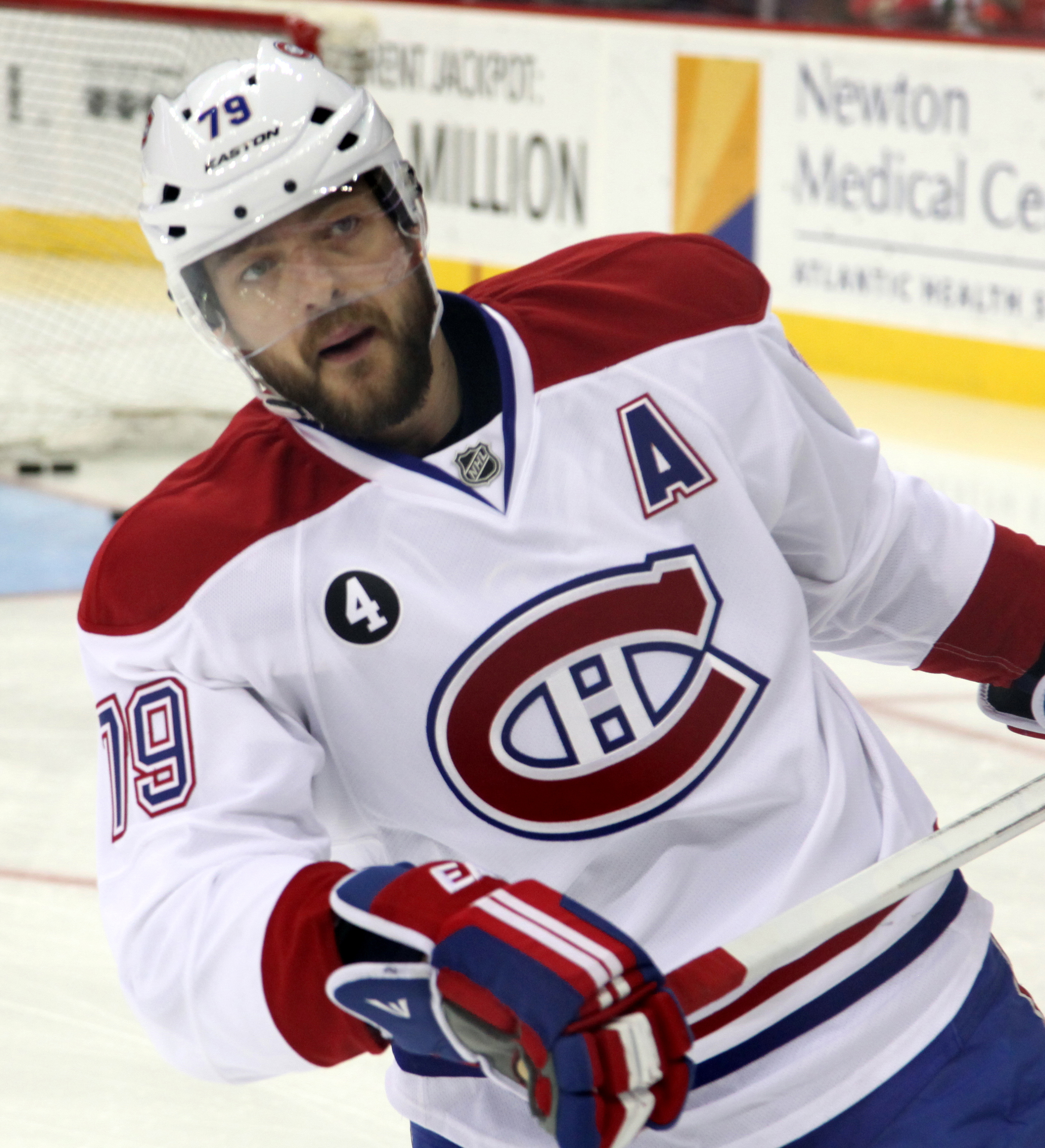
- Markov with the Montreal Canadiens in 2015
- Born: 20 December 1978 (age 47) Voskresensk, Russian SFSR, Soviet Union
- Height: 6 ft 0 in (183 cm)
- Weight: 203 lb (92 kg; 14 st 7 lb)
- Position: Defence
- Shot: Left
- Played for: Khimik Voskresensk; Dynamo Moscow; Montreal Canadiens; Vityaz Chekhov; Ak Bars Kazan; Lokomotiv Yaroslavl
- National team: Russia
- NHL draft: 162nd overall, 1998; Montreal Canadiens
- Playing career: 1995–2020

Andrei Viktorovich Markov (Russian: Андрей Викторович Марков; born 20 December 1978) is a Russian–Canadian former professional ice hockey player. Nicknamed "the General", Markov played as a defenceman from 2000 to 2017 with the Montreal Canadiens of the National Hockey League (NHL). He holds both Russian and Canadian citizenship.

== Playing career ==
Markov was drafted by the Montreal Canadiens in the sixth round, 162nd overall, in the 1998 NHL entry draft. After being considered one of the best defencemen in Russia in 2000, he came over to North America and split time with the Canadiens and their then-minor league affiliate, the Quebec Citadelles of the American Hockey League (AHL). After rounding out his defensive game, he became a regular in the Canadiens' starting line-up and was widely considered to be their most complete defenceman.

During the 2004–05 NHL lockout, Markov played in his native Russia with Dynamo Moscow of the Russian Superleague (RSL).

Markov signed a four-year contract with the Canadiens on 28 May 2007, keeping him with the team through the 2010–11 season. He had a career year in the 2007–08 season, and was selected to his first NHL All-Star Game as a starter, in Atlanta.

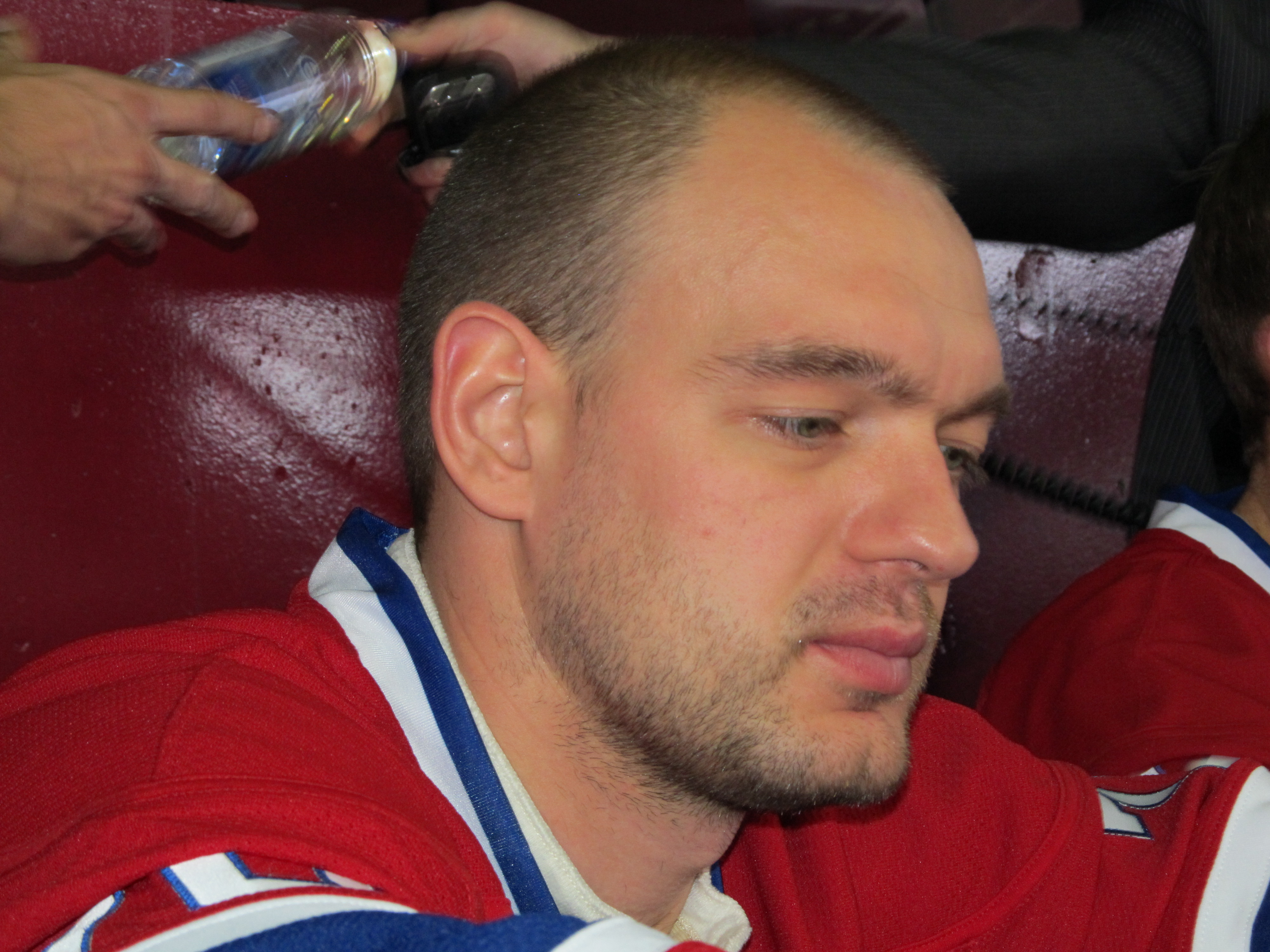
Markov with the Montreal Canadiens in 2010

On 1 October 2009, Markov suffered a lacerated ankle injury after colliding with teammate Carey Price's skate and was initially expected to be out of the Canadiens' lineup until February 2010. Markov made a full recovery almost two months ahead of schedule and returned to action on 19 December 2009, when the Canadiens faced the New York Islanders. Markov ended up jump-starting the Habs' offence with two goals in his return en route to a 3–0 victory. During the 2010 Stanley Cup playoffs against the Pittsburgh Penguins on 30 April, Markov suffered a leg injury after being hit by Matt Cooke.

On 16 July 2010, Markov became a Canadian citizen. During the 2010–11 season, he played only seven games, earning three points (one goal and two assists). On 13 November 2010, Markov suffered a knee injury in a game against the Carolina Hurricanes and underwent surgery 8 December 2010, missing the remainder of the season.

On 23 June 2011, Markov signed a three-year contract with the Canadiens. On 10 March 2012, he played in his first game in over a year, tallying an assist in a 4–1 victory over the Vancouver Canucks. On 23 June 2014, Markov re-signed with the Canadiens to a three-year contract worth an annual average value of $5.75 million. On 15 September 2014, Markov was named an alternate captain for the Canadiens, along with P. K. Subban, Tomáš Plekanec and Max Pacioretty, sharing the leadership duties of a Canadiens squad currently without a team captain. On 18 September 2015, it was announced that Markov and Brendan Gallagher would serve as alternate captains for Max Pacioretty.

On 26 July 2017, it was announced that Andrei Markov would not be returning to Montreal Canadiens for the 2017–2018 season after spending his entire NHL career with the team and playing 990 games over 16 years. Two days later, on 28 July, it was announced that Markov had agreed to a two-year deal with the KHL's Ak Bars Kazan. Markov's team would go on to win the Gagarin Cup in his first season in the KHL.

On 16 April 2020 Andrei Markov announced his retirement from professional hockey.

== Career statistics ==
=== Regular season and playoffs ===
			Regular season					Playoffs
Season	Team	League	GP	G	A	Pts	PIM	GP	G	A	Pts	PIM
1995–96	Khimik Voskresensk	IHL	38	0	0	0	14	—	—	—	—	—
1996–97	Khimik Voskresensk	RSL	43	8	4	12	32	2	1	1	2	0
1997–98	Khimik Voskresensk	RSL	43	10	5	15	83	—	—	—	—	—
1998–99	Dynamo Moscow	RSL	38	10	11	21	32	16	3	6	9	6
1999–00	Dynamo Moscow	RSL	29	11	12	23	28	17	4	3	7	8
2000–01	Quebec Citadelles	AHL	14	0	5	5	4	7	1	1	2	2
2000–01	Montreal Canadiens	NHL	63	6	17	23	18	—	—	—	—	—
2001–02	Quebec Citadelles	AHL	12	4	6	10	7	—	—	—	—	—
2001–02	Montreal Canadiens	NHL	56	5	19	24	24	12	1	3	4	8
2002–03	Montreal Canadiens	NHL	79	13	24	37	34	—	—	—	—	—
2003–04	Montreal Canadiens	NHL	69	6	22	28	20	11	1	4	5	8
2004–05	Dynamo Moscow	RSL	42	7	16	23	76	10	2	0	2	22
2005–06	Montreal Canadiens	NHL	67	10	36	46	74	6	0	1	1	4
2006–07	Montreal Canadiens	NHL	77	6	43	49	56	—	—	—	—	—
2007–08	Montreal Canadiens	NHL	82	16	42	58	63	12	1	3	4	8
2008–09	Montreal Canadiens	NHL	78	12	52	64	36	—	—	—	—	—
2009–10	Montreal Canadiens	NHL	45	6	28	34	32	8	0	4	4	0
2010–11	Montreal Canadiens	NHL	7	1	2	3	4	—	—	—	—	—
2011–12	Montreal Canadiens	NHL	13	0	3	3	4	—	—	—	—	—
2012–13	Vityaz Chekhov	KHL	21	1	5	6	16	—	—	—	—	—
2012–13	Montreal Canadiens	NHL	48	10	20	30	14	5	0	1	1	0
2013–14	Montreal Canadiens	NHL	81	7	36	43	34	17	1	9	10	38
2014–15	Montreal Canadiens	NHL	81	10	40	50	38	12	1	1	2	8
2015–16	Montreal Canadiens	NHL	82	6	39	44	38	—	—	—	—	—
2016–17	Montreal Canadiens	NHL	62	6	30	36	16	6	0	1	1	10
2017–18	Ak Bars Kazan	KHL	55	5	28	33	42	19	1	2	3	12
2018–19	Ak Bars Kazan	KHL	49	2	12	14	20	4	0	0	0	6
2019–20	Lokomotiv Yaroslavl	KHL	23	1	6	7	32	6	0	1	1	2
RSL totals			195	46	48	94	223	45	10	10	20	36
NHL totals			990	119	453	572	505	89	5	27	32	56
KHL totals			148	9	52	61	110	29	1	3	4	20

=== International ===
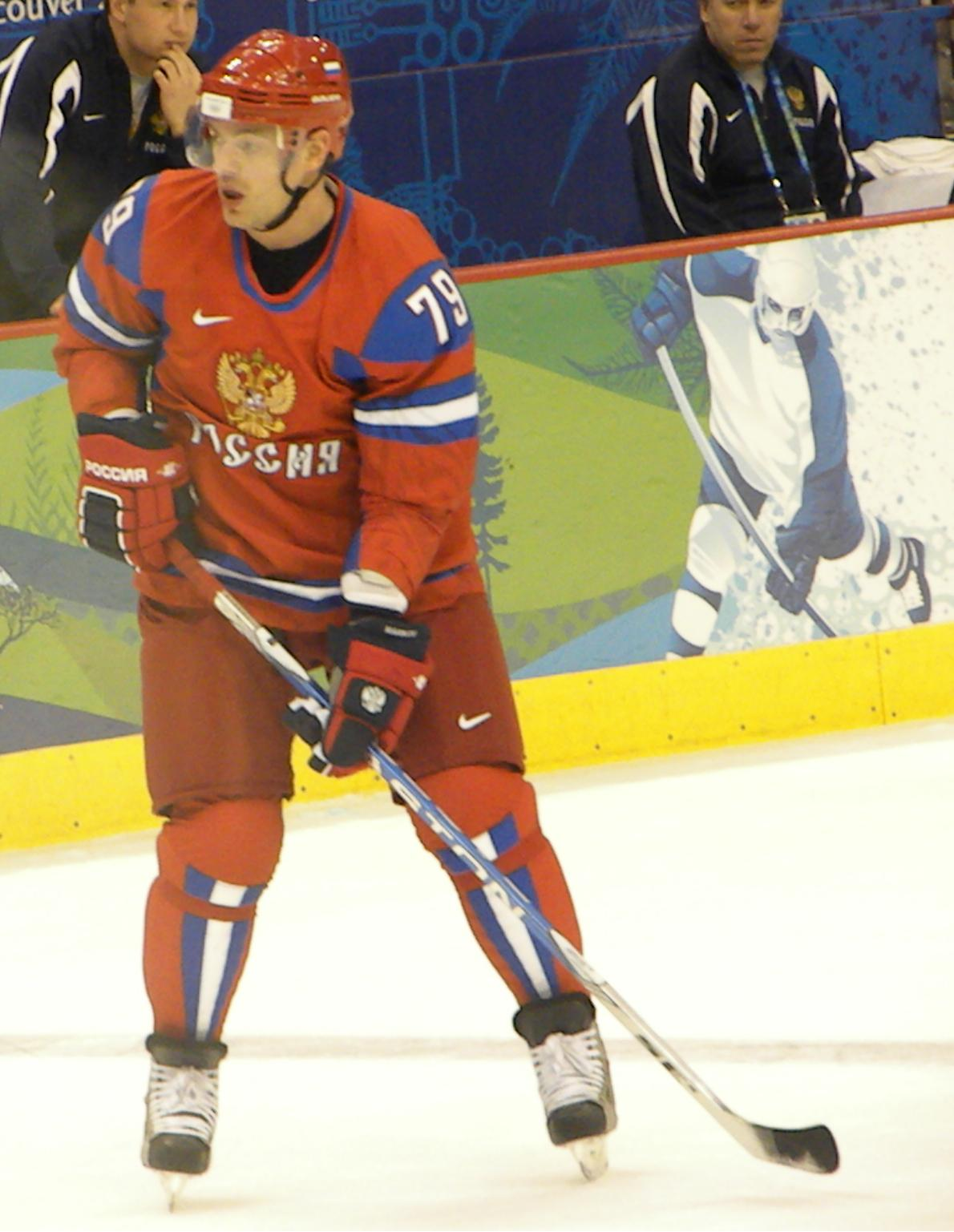
- Markov at the 2010 Winter Olympics

Medal record

Men's ice hockey

Representing Russia

World Championships
Gold medal – first place	2008 Canada	
Bronze medal – third place	2005 Austria	
Bronze medal – third place	2007 Russia	

World Junior Championships
Silver medal – second place	1998 Finland	
Bronze medal – third place	1997 Switzerland	

Year	Team	Event	Result	GP	G	A	Pts	PIM
1996	Russia	EJC	1st place, gold medalist(s)	5	0	0	0	0
1997	Russia	WJC	3rd place, bronze medalist(s)	6	0	1	1	2
1998	Russia	WJC	2nd place, silver medalist(s)	7	3	2	5	6
1999	Russia	WC	5th	6	1	4	5	2
2000	Russia	WC	11th	6	0	2	2	0
2004	Russia	WCH	5th	2	0	1	1	2
2005	Russia	WC	3rd place, bronze medalist(s)	9	1	4	5	20
2006	Russia	Oly	4th	8	1	2	3	6
2007	Russia	WC	3rd place, bronze medalist(s)	8	3	5	8	2
2008	Russia	WC	1st place, gold medalist(s)	6	0	2	2	4
2010	Russia	Oly	6th	4	0	2	2	0
2014	Russia	Oly	5th	5	0	2	2	0
2016	Russia	WCH	4th	4	0	0	0	6
Junior totals				18	3	3	6	8
Senior totals				58	6	24	30	42

== Awards and honours ==
Award	Year	Ref
NHL
All-Star Game	2008, 2009	
KHL
All-Star Game	2013, 2018	
Gagarin Cup champion	2018	
