= 2009 National Hockey League All-Star Game =

Professional ice hockey exhibition game

2009 NHL All-Star Game
	1	2	3	OT	SO	Total
West	2	6	3	0	0/2	11
East	4	4	3	0	2/3	12
- Date: January 25, 2009
- Arena: Bell Centre
- City: Montreal
- MVP: Alexei Kovalev (Montreal)
- Attendance: 21,273

The 2009 National Hockey League All-Star Game was held at the Bell Centre in Montreal, home of the Montreal Canadiens, in conjunction with the Montreal Canadiens centennial celebrations on Sunday evening, January 25, 2009. The game was held between two teams, each representing a conference (Eastern and Western) of the National Hockey League (NHL). The Eastern Conference team won the game 12–11, decided by shootout.

The game was part of a weekend of activities. On Saturday, a game featuring NHL rookies and sophomores preceded a skills competition among the NHL players, called the NHL All-Star Game SuperSkills Competition. In a first for the All-Star Game, the "Breakaway Challenge," a part of the skills competition, had fans voting for the winner using their mobile phones, with the real-time voting results posted on the NHL's website. The game was preceded by a circus arts display and a concert was held between the second and third periods.

== Skills Competition ==
Unlike previous years, the Skills Competition did not have players playing on the behalf of their respective conferences (thus, there was no conference-based scoring) and the team-based Obstacle Course was removed. In addition, YoungStars players became eligible to play in the Fastest Skater, Hardest Shot, Shooting Accuracy, and Breakaway Challenge events.

In reaction to the changed format for the skills competition the year before, the Fastest Skater event reverted to the traditional one-lap format. The breakaway challenge used Jason Maggio, a local minor hockey goaltender defending the goal (to answer criticisms that the all-star goaltenders simply poke-checked the players as they were making the shot) as well as the player being able to take as many shots as possible in one minute (instead of only one shot). Finally, instead of being a judged competition, the breakaway challenge allowed the public to vote for the winner via text messaging. The public chose Alexander Ovechkin, whose highlight was a shot using two sticks while wearing a series of props provided by Evgeni Malkin, by a landslide, with 47% of the votes. Malkin won the shooting accuracy over Dany Heatley in a sudden death shoot-off after both scored 4-for-4 in the preliminaries. Malkin shot 3-4, missing the last target, while Heatley hit his first two but missed on the third. Andrew Cogliano walked off as the winner of the Fastest Skater competition.

The Hardest Shot competition was played for charity, with each competitor contributing $1,000, to be matched by their team and the league, as well as the National Hockey League Players' Association (NHLPA), for a total of $24,000 to the charity chosen by the winner of the competition. Zdeno Chara won the event, with a record 105.4 mph shot (eclipsing Al Iafrate, who had set the record the last time the All-Star game was in Montreal). The Elimination Shootout involved all 40 skaters (but only four of the six goaltenders – leaving Roberto Luongo as the only player to not participate in any of the skills events), with the goaltenders being able to choose which skaters they will face off against. The field was narrowed from 40 to just 12 after one round, and Shane Doan eventually outlasted Marc Savard after seven rounds (including two rounds in which none of the three remaining players — Doan, Savard nor Milan Hejduk — scored).

== YoungStars Game ==
For the first time, the YoungStars game, part of the Skills Competition featured a three-on-three rookies versus sophomores format, consisting of three six-minute periods with the clock stopping only within the last minute of each game. Coaching the rookies was Luc Robitaille and for the sophomores was Pete Mahovlich. Unlike the previous All-Star Game, YoungStars goaltenders were named prior to the game, though sophomore goaltender Carey Price volunteered to do double duty after Erik Ersberg withdrew from the game due to injury. The game saw rookie goaltender Pekka Rinne (who replaced Steve Mason) make 20 saves in a 9–5 victory for the rookies. Rookie Blake Wheeler was named the MVP of the YoungStars game after scoring four goals.

=== Roster ===
	Rookies	Sophomores
Coaches	Luc Robitaille	Pete Mahovlich
Roster	(Finland) 35 – G Pekka Rinne (Nashville Predators) (Canada) 8 – D Drew Doughty (Los Angeles Kings) (Canada) 2 – D Luke Schenn (Toronto Maple Leafs) (Sweden) 21 – F Patrik Berglund (St. Louis Blues) (Denmark) 19 – F Mikkel Boedker (Phoenix Coyotes) (Czech Republic) 67 – F Michael Frolik (Florida Panthers) (Canada) 18 – F James Neal (Dallas Stars) (Canada) 91 – F Steven Stamkos (Tampa Bay Lightning) (Canada) 32 – F Kris Versteeg (Chicago Blackhawks) (United States) 26 – F Blake Wheeler (Boston Bruins)	(Canada) 31 – G Carey Price (Montreal Canadiens) (Canada) 58 – D Kris Letang (Pittsburgh Penguins) (Canada) 18 – D Marc Staal (New York Rangers) (Canada) 36 – F Dave Bolland (Chicago Blackhawks) (Canada) 13 – F Andrew Cogliano (Edmonton Oilers) (United States) 17 – F Brandon Dubinsky (New York Rangers) (Canada) 10 – F Bryan Little (Atlanta Thrashers) (Canada) 57 – F David Perron (St. Louis Blues) (Canada) 21 – F Mason Raymond (Vancouver Canucks) (Canada) 16 – F Devin Setoguchi (San Jose Sharks)

Final score
	Period 1	Period 2	Period 3	Final
Sophomores	1	3	1	5
Rookies	3	4	2	9

- Milan Lucic was named to the YoungStars game, but did not play.
- Erik Ersberg was named to the YoungStars game, but did not play.
- Steve Mason was named to the YoungStars game, but did not play
- Nicklas Backstrom was named to the YoungStars game, but did not play.

== Absentee punishment ==
Due to a growing number of otherwise healthy players choosing to skip the All-Star Game to rest, the NHL began to enforce the understanding that players that are named to the event must participate in some capacity. Those who choose not to participate must miss a game, either before the Game or after. Players named to the YoungStars game will not be subject to this policy, as their consent is required for participation. Thus, because Detroit Red Wings players Pavel Datsyuk and Nicklas Lidström declined to attend the festivities due to injury, they were each forced to miss one regular season game. Sidney Crosby, who was also ruled out due to injury, participated in off-ice activities and was not forced to miss a game.

== Rosters ==
Fan voting for the All-Star Game starting line-up was closed on January 2, 2009. The rosters were announced on January 3 by retired Canadian Hockey Hall of Fame player Jean Beliveau, who played in 13 All-Star games during his career.

	Eastern Conference	Western Conference
Coach:	(Canada) Claude Julien (Boston Bruins)	(Canada) Todd McLellan (San Jose Sharks)
Assistant coach:	(Canada) Guy Carbonneau (Montreal Canadiens)	(Canada) Mike Babcock (Detroit Red Wings)
Captains:	(Russia) Alexei Kovalev	(Canada) Joe Thornton
Starters:	(Canada) 31 – G Carey Price (Montreal Canadiens) (United States) 44 – D Mike Komisarek (Montreal Canadiens) (Russia) 79 – D Andrei Markov (Montreal Canadiens) (Russia) 71 – F Evgeni Malkin (Pittsburgh Penguins) (Canada) 4 – F Vincent Lecavalier (Tampa Bay Lightning) (Russia) 27 – F Alexei Kovalev (Montreal Canadiens) - (C)	(Canada) 35 – G Jean-Sebastien Giguere (Anaheim Ducks) (Canada) 27 – D Scott Niedermayer (Anaheim Ducks) (Canada) 51 – D Brian Campbell (Chicago Blackhawks) (Canada) 15 – F Ryan Getzlaf (Anaheim Ducks) (Canada) 19 – F Jonathan Toews (Chicago Blackhawks) (United States) 88 – F Patrick Kane (Chicago Blackhawks)
Reserves:	(United States) 30 – G Tim Thomas (Boston Bruins) (Sweden) 35 – G Henrik Lundqvist (New York Rangers) (Switzerland) 2 – D Mark Streit (New York Islanders) (Canada) 3 – D Jay Bouwmeester (Florida Panthers) (Czech Republic) 15 – D Tomas Kaberle (Toronto Maple Leafs) (Slovakia) 33 – D Zdeno Chara (Boston Bruins) (Canada) 7 – F Jeff Carter (Philadelphia Flyers) (Russia) 8 – F Alexander Ovechkin (Washington Capitals) (United States) 9 – F Zach Parise (New Jersey Devils) (Canada) 12 – F Eric Staal (Carolina Hurricanes) (Russia) 17 – F Ilya Kovalchuk (Atlanta Thrashers) (Austria) 20 – F Thomas Vanek (Buffalo Sabres) (Canada) 26 – F Martin St. Louis (Tampa Bay Lightning) (Canada) 51 – F Dany Heatley (Ottawa Senators) (Canada) 91 – F Marc Savard (Boston Bruins)	(Canada) 1 – G Roberto Luongo (Vancouver Canucks) (Finland) 32 – G Niklas Backstrom (Minnesota Wild) (Canada) 3 – D Stephane Robidas (Dallas Stars) (Canada) 6 – D Shea Weber (Nashville Predators) (Canada) 22 – D Dan Boyle (San Jose Sharks) (Canada) 44 – D Sheldon Souray (Edmonton Oilers) (United States) 7 – F Keith Tkachuk (St. Louis Blues) (United States) 9 – F Mike Modano (Dallas Stars) (Canada) 10 – F Patrick Marleau (San Jose Sharks) (Canada) 12 – F Jarome Iginla (Calgary Flames) (Canada) 18 – F Shane Doan (Phoenix Coyotes) (Czech Republic) 23 – F Milan Hejduk (Colorado Avalanche) (United States) 24 – F Dustin Brown (Los Angeles Kings) (Canada) 61 – F Rick Nash (Columbus Blue Jackets) (Canada) 97 – F Joe Thornton (San Jose Sharks) - (C)

Referees: (Canada) Marc Joannette and (United States) Brad Meier
Linesmen: (Canada) Greg Devorski and (Canada) Pierre Racicot

=== Notes ===
- ^W1Nicklas Lidstrom was named to the Western Conference All-Star Team, but chose not to play. Stephane Robidas was named as his replacement.
- ^W2Pavel Datsyuk was named to the Western Conference All-Star Team, but was unable to play due to injury. Patrick Marleau was named as his replacement.
- ^E1Sidney Crosby was voted into the starting lineup for the Eastern Conference All-Star Team, but was unable to play due to injury. Martin St. Louis was named as his replacement on the roster and Vincent Lecavalier as his replacement in the starting lineup.

== Uniforms ==
Replacing the prototypical Reebok Edge design of the previous two games, the 2009 All-Star Game featured a unique design inspired by the Canadiens, featuring the host team's colors of bleu, blanc et rouge. The Eastern Conference team's jerseys were primarily red, while the Western Conference wore white. The uniform featured an asymmetrical design, with a contrasting color stripe coming down one side of the body of the uniform and wrapping around at the waistline. One sleeve on each jersey featured three stars with the years 1969, 1975, and 1993 on them, representing the three previous times the Canadiens had hosted the All-Star Game since the league dropped the Stanley Cup Champions vs. NHL All-Stars format.

== Summary ==
WEST	11 – 12 (SO) (2-4, 6-4, 3-3, 0-0, 0-2)	EAST	Bell Centre (21,273); Montreal
First period
Tkachuk (Nash, Hejduk) 1:16	Referees:
6:26 Ovechkin (Savard)	Marc Joannette
9:30 Staal (Bouwmeester, Kovalev)	Brad Meier
16:34 Kovalev (Kaberle)
19:23 Markov (Ovechkin, Savard)	Linesmen:
Marleau (Thornton, Niedermayer) 19:48	Greg Devorski
Second period	Pierre Racicot
1:21 St. Louis (Kaberle)
2:11 Parise (St. Louis, Streit)	MVP:
Souray (Hejduk) 3:29	Alexei Kovalev (Montreal) (3G,1A)
Boyle (Doan, Campbell) 5:14
7:45 Malkin
Nash 8:27
Hejduk (Boyle, Nash) 9:02
Souray (2) (Thornton, Marleau) 10:34
13:35 Kovalev (2)
Iginla (Thornton, Marleau) 16:46
Third period
Doan (Modano, Brown) 0:32
2:17 Heatley (Savard)
Toews (Kane, Souray) 2:32
13:19 St. Louis (2) (Streit, Bouwmeester)
Kane 15:18
16:21 Bouwmeester (Ovechkin)
Overtime period
no scoring
Shootout
Vincent Lecavalier
Shane Doan
Alexei Kovalev
Rick Nash (miss)
Alexander Ovechkin

W - Tim Thomas L - Roberto Luongo

== Features ==
A pre-game performance featured acrobatics and music by circus arts group Cirque Eloize. The U.S. national anthem was sung by soul singer Alan Prater and the Canadian national anthem was performed by the Montreal Jubilation Gospel Choir, under the direction of its founder Trevor Payne. Simple Plan and Marie-Mai performed during the intermission.
