= Montreal Canadiens centennial =

Ice hockey team centennial celebration

The Montreal Canadiens used this 100th anniversary patch during the 2008-09 season

The Montreal Canadiens centennial was celebrated by the Montreal Canadiens ice hockey team during its 2008–09 and 2009–10 seasons, commemorating the 100th Anniversary of the founding of the National Hockey League's most successful club. The 2009 NHL All-Star Game was played at Bell Centre in Montreal, Quebec as part of the celebrations, and the 2009 NHL entry draft was held there in late June.

On April 5, 2008, the logo for the 2009 NHL All-Star Game was unveiled in Montreal.

== Retiring of uniform numbers ==
As part of its centennial anniversary celebrations, the Canadiens organization retired the following uniform numbers:

- 2005–06: Dickie Moore, Yvan Cournoyer (number 12); Bernard "Boom Boom" Geoffrion (number 5)
- 2006–07: Serge Savard (number 18); Ken Dryden (number 29)
- 2007–08: Larry Robinson (number 19); Bob Gainey (number 23)
- 2008–09: Patrick Roy (number 33)
- 2009–10: Elmer Lach (number 16); Emile Bouchard (number 3)

This was the fastest the team had ever retired numbers. From 1937 when the Canadiens first retired the number 7 of Howie Morenz to the start of the Centennial lead up in 2005, there was roughly an average of a decade between retirements. During this lead up there were two retired every calendar year. This more than doubled the amount of players honoured this way, bringing the total from 7 to 17 by the end of the centennial.

== Centennial events and initiatives ==
On September 24, 2008, the Canadiens held a press conference to announce all the events the team is holding:

- A set of commemorative dollar coins to be minted by the Royal Canadian Mint.
- A set of commemorative stamps to be issued by Canada Post.
- A set of 200 Upper Deck anniversary cards.
- Canadiens Monopoly
- Builder's night honoring past coaches.
- Opening of the 'Centennial Plaza' outside of the Bell Centre.
- Original Six salutes — when "original six" teams visit the Canadiens.
- Opening of a community outdoor rink.
- A concert by the Montreal Symphony Orchestra, which is celebrating its 75th anniversary.
- A movie, Pour toujours, les Canadiens!
- EA Sports' NHL 09 video game including the 'Centennial Montreal Canadiens', a special team of the top players ever part of the Canadiens franchise

On opening night, the Canadiens organization unveiled the Ring of Honour in the Bell Centre. It consists of an exhibit of all players and builders of the Montreal Canadiens currently in the Hockey Hall of Fame, placed at the back walls of the arena's upper deck. On December 4, 2009, the Montreal Canadiens played a "centennial game" on the 100th anniversary of their induction as a professional hockey organization. They played the Boston Bruins and won by a score of 5-1. Michael Cammalleri scored his second hat-trick of the season that night for the Canadiens.

=== Centennial jerseys ===
The Canadiens brought back five jerseys from their history worn throughout 2008-2010. They were only worn one or two times each.

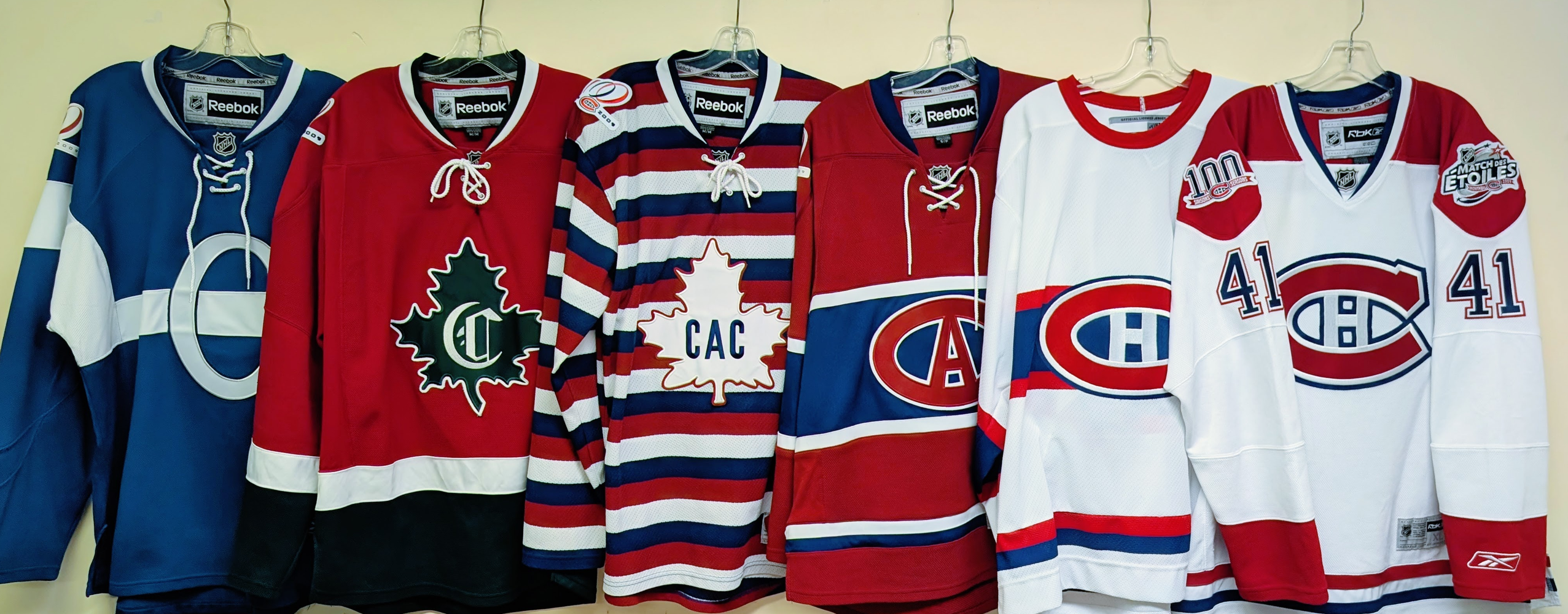
The specialty jerseys worn by the Canadiens.

- 1909-10: A blue jersey with a white centre stripe that went up to the shoulder with a large C.
- 1910-11: A red jersey with a green leaf with a C inside.
- 1912-13: A blue, white, and red barberpole style jersey with a white leaf and CAC inside.
- 1915-16: A red jersey with a blue centre stripe and a CA logo.
- 1945-46: A white jersey with a blue centre stripe and an earlier version of the Canadiens CH logo.

They also wore their white jersey at home for a pair of games calling it the 1970-71 jersey. Referencing how white jerseys used to be considered the "home" at the time.

== See also ==
- 2008–09 Montreal Canadiens season
- 2009–10 Montreal Canadiens season
