= 2008–09 Ottawa Senators season =

NHL hockey team season

2008–09 Ottawa Senators
- Division: 4th Northeast
- Conference: 11th Eastern
- 2008–09 record: 36–35–11
- Home record: 22–12–7
- Road record: 14–23–4
- Goals for: 217
- Goals against: 237

Team information
- General manager: Bryan Murray
- Coach: Craig Hartsburg (Oct.–Feb.); Cory Clouston (Feb.–Apr.)
- Captain: Daniel Alfredsson
- Alternate captains: Dany Heatley; Chris Phillips
- Arena: Scotiabank Place
- Average attendance: 18,949

Team leaders
- Goals: Dany Heatley (39)
- Assists: Daniel Alfredsson (50)
- Points: Daniel Alfredsson (74)
- Penalty minutes: Chris Neil (146)
- Plus/minus: Daniel Alfredsson (+7)
- Wins: Alex Auld, Brian Elliott (16)
- Goals against average: Alex Auld (2.47)

The 2008–09 Ottawa Senators season was the team's 17th season in the National Hockey League (NHL). The team began the season with a new head coach, Craig Hartsburg, and numerous personnel changes after narrowly making the 2008 Stanley Cup playoffs. However, the team had a losing record under the new coach and he was fired in February, replaced by Binghamton Senators' head coach Cory Clouston. The team improved its record under Clouston, but not enough to qualify for the 2009 playoffs, ending an 11-year string of qualifying for the playoffs.

== Off-season ==
It was an off-season of numerous personnel changes. Wade Redden, a long-time Senator, signed a contract as a free agent with the New York Rangers. Ray Emery and Brian McGrattan, considered poor influences in the dressing room, were discarded. The Senators re-signed forwards Shean Donovan, Chris Kelly and Antoine Vermette and made several free agent signings, including Alex Auld, Jarkko Ruutu and Jason Smith. After an extended period of negotiations with Andrej Meszaros failed to produce a contract, the Tampa Bay Lightning showed interest in the defenceman, who was a restricted free agent. Unable to provide the draft picks needed to compensate the Senators, a trade was made and the Senators received Filip Kuba, Alexandre Picard and a first-round pick in the 2009 NHL entry draft from Tampa Bay.

=== Highlights ===
On June 5, it was reported that Wade Redden would not sign a contract paying $3.5 million annually with the Senators. He instead became an unrestricted free agent (UFA) on July 1 and signed a six-year, $39 million contract with the New York Rangers. On June 13, 2008, the Senators named Craig Hartsburg, coach of the Ontario Hockey League's Sault Ste. Marie Greyhounds, the new head coach after having interviewed candidates Bob Hartley and Peter DeBoer. Hartsburg signed a three-year contract with the Senators.

On June 20, the day of the 2008 NHL entry draft, the Senators placed Ray Emery on waivers and re-signed Chris Kelly to a new four-year, $8.5 million contract. At the draft, the Senators selected Erik Karlsson with their first-round pick (15th overall) and proceeded to select Patrick Wiercioch (42nd overall), Zack Smith (79th overall), Andre Petersson (109th overall), Derek Grant (119th overall), Mark Borowiecki (139th overall) and Emil Sandin (199th overall).

On July 1, the Senators announced that they had signed goaltender Alex Auld to a two-year contract worth $1 million annually. Auld is expected to serve as a backup to Martin Gerber for the 2008–09 season. On July 2, the Senators announced that they had re-signed forward Shean Donovan to a two-year contract at $625,000 per season. The Sens also announced that they have signed forward Jarkko Ruutu to a three-year contract worth $1.3 million per season. On July 5, the Ottawa Senators announced that Antoine Vermette had elected to take the club to salary arbitration. The Senators and Vermette agreed to a two-year deal on July 31. On July 8, the Senators announced that they had signed defenceman Jason Smith to a two-year, $5.2 million contract. On July 16, the Senators announced that they will host the Detroit Red Wings in their official home-opener on October 11. On July 17, the Ottawa Senators and CHUM Radio announced that the club and The Team 1200 had signed a multi-year extension to their agreement to broadcast Senators' games. The original ten-year contract expired at the end of the 2007–08 season. On July 31, the Ottawa Senators and Antoine Vermette avoided going to arbitration by agreeing to terms on a new two-year contract worth $5.525 million. Vermette would make $2.525 million and $3 million for the 2008–09 and 2009–10 seasons respectively.

On August 29, in a trade similar to the Alexei Yashin trade in 2001, former first-round pick Andrej Meszaros was traded to the Tampa Bay Lightning in exchange for Filip Kuba, Alexandre Picard and a first-round pick in the 2009 NHL entry draft (obtained by Tampa Bay in an earlier trade with the San Jose Sharks). Meszaros was a restricted free agent demanding $1 million more per season than what the Senators were willing to offer. After Tampa threatened to offer Meszaros an offer sheet with picks as compensation on August 28, the Senators opted to make a trade with Tampa. Meszaros subsequently signed a six-year, $24 million contract on August 30 with the Lightning. On September 2, the Senators made a deal with the Vancouver Canucks and traded defenceman Lawrence Nycholat for centre/right winger Ryan Shannon. On the same day, they signed another former Canucks player, Brad Isbister, who was an unrestricted free agent. On September 27, veteran defenseman Luke Richardson re-signed on a one-year, two-way contract with the Senators for his second season with the club.

== Pre-season ==
On October 2, the Senators played their first-ever game in Europe, a pre-season exhibition game in Gothenburg, Sweden, against Frolunda HC, which Ottawa captain Daniel Alfredsson played for before joining the NHL and during the 2004–05 NHL lockout. The Senators finished the 2008 pre-season with a record of 4–2–0–0.

Pre-season
September/October

Date	Time	Opponent	Location	Score
September 20	7:00 pm	New York Rangers	Scotiabank Place	W, 3–2
September 22	7:00 pm	New York Rangers	Madison Square Garden	L, 2–1
September 24	7:00 pm	Philadelphia Flyers	Scotiabank Place	W, 3–1
September 26	7:30 pm	Montreal Canadiens	Bell Centre	L, 5–0
September 27	7:00 pm	Montreal Canadiens	Scotiabank Place	W, 3–1
October 2	1:00 pm	Frölunda HC	Scandinavium Arena	W, 4–1

== Regular season ==
The Senators started their season with a pair of games in Stockholm, Sweden. The Senators played the Pittsburgh Penguins twice at the Scandinavium on October 4 and October 5. The teams split the results, with the Penguins winning the first in overtime and the Senators winning the second. New Senator defenceman Filip Kuba picked up at least one point in each of the Senators' first eight games of the season, setting the NHL record for consecutive team games with assists from the start of a season by a defenceman. The previous mark of seven was set by Brad Park with the Boston Bruins in 1981–82. All points were assists and Kuba did not score his first goal with the Senators until November 13.

Alexander Nikulin, who had been demoted to the American Hockey League (AHL)'s Binghamton Senators, threatened to return to Russia unless he was traded. As a result, he was traded from Binghamton to the Phoenix Coyotes' AHL affiliate, the San Antonio Rampage, for Drew Fata.

For a game on November 22 against the New York Rangers, the Senators unveiled their new third jersey. Marketed as "Back in Black," the jersey is primarily black. The Senators' primary logo moves to the shoulders and the nickname "SENS" is across the front of the jersey.

Prior to that game, the Senators players, the team below the playoff cutoff in the standings for most of October through November, decided to grow moustaches, similar to the playoff beard tradition of teams in the playoffs. The team started growing the moustaches following a loss to the Montreal Canadiens on November 20. The idea originated with Dany Heatley.

On November 27, the Senators waived Luke Richardson, a veteran of nearly 20 years in the NHL. He was not picked up by any other team and subsequently retired. He had not seen much playing time with Senators, and had been a healthy scratch several times in the season.

From December until early January, the Senators took an eight-game road trip as Scotiabank Place was used for the 2009 World Junior Ice Hockey Championships. The team, already well back of a playoff spot, received intense scrutiny by the media, believing a "shake-up" of some kind was imminent. The team only won one game on the road trip, and on January 7, Owner Eugene Melnyk was compelled to respond to media reports of the imminent firings of general manager Bryan Murray and head coach Craig Hartsburg:

“Contrary to what is being reported today by the media, I have made no decisions with respect to any personnel changes within the Senators organization. Winning remains our No. 1 priority and there is a collective focus by our management, our coaching staff and our players to deliver this to our fans.
I, along with our fans, will do nothing but continue to remain fully committed to our Senators and enthusiastically cheer them on to a successful second half of the season.
This is crunch time. Now, more than ever, is the time to rally behind our team. We don’t surrender half-way through the season.
Every victory from here on in matters. We know it and the fans know it. Period.”

At the end of the road trip on January 8, the club was 13 points behind the eighth and final playoff spot, held by the Buffalo Sabres. The Ottawa Citizen launched the "Tavares Cup," similar in spirit to the "Daigle Cup" of 1993, to keep track of the bottom five teams in the NHL, all of which had a chance, at least via the draft lottery, to draft the highly rated junior player, John Tavares. At the time of the start of the "competition," the Senators were within the lowest five teams in the League.

Also on January 7, forward Jarkko Ruutu received a suspension of two games for biting in an altercation with a Buffalo Sabres forward on January 6. It was Ruutu's second suspension of the season, after elbowing a Montreal Canadiens forward earlier in the season.

On January 9, 2009, goaltender Brian Elliott was recalled by Ottawa from Binghamton. He had been named the AHL's Goaltender of the Month for December. On January 15, Senators goaltender Martin Gerber was demoted to Binghamton for a two-week conditioning stint; he was placed on waivers and was assigned to Binghamton on January 27. Elliott started six games in a row and remained with Ottawa.

On January 29, less than a month after previous comments to the media about the Senators, Eugene Melnyk responded to media speculation about possible organization changes with another memorable quote:

“Anybody that says we should blow up this organization should get their own bomb and go blow themselves up.”

At the time, the Senators remained near the bottom of the League in 29th place, with the lowest goal-scoring record in the NHL.

However, only three days later, on February 2, head coach Craig Hartsburg was fired, ending his tenure with the Senators at only 48 games. Following a 7–4 loss to the Washington Capitals on February 1, Hartsburg had called out his team for not playing hard. Binghamton Senators' head coach Cory Clouston was elevated to head coach of Ottawa for the balance of the season. Clouston became the fourth head coach to coach the Senators in a year, prompting the media to dub the players as "coach-killers." Assistant Coach Curtis Hunt was also let go (he became the Binghamton head coach) and recently retired defenceman Luke Richardson joined the coaching staff as an assistant.

On February 12, former head coach John Paddock (who had moved on to coach the AHL' Philadelphia Phantoms) weighed in on the firing, stating that at some point that GM Bryan Murray would be held accountable:

“I think now he's next in line. We were 14 games over .500 when I was fired. They're seven under now. Somebody needs to take responsibility for that. Whether the coaches he hired and fired were good or not, they're his players and they're either not playing good or can't play, one or the other.” He was then asked which was the case: “The players are not very good, that's the problem.”

Paddock apologized to Murray via e-mail. Murray commented, "I'm disappointed and a little bit surprised by it. I'm not sure what purpose he was trying to achieve doing that. He sent me an apology. The only complaint I ever had with John was that I didn't think he worked hard enough at getting himself ready and getting the team ready to play games."

Late in February and early in March, as the season neared the trade deadline, the team still held out hold of making the playoffs although the team remained over ten points out of a playoff spot, as the team was winning more often with Clouston. The Senators began making roster deals, sending Dean McAmmond and a 2009 first-round pick for Chris Campoli and Mike Comrie. By the NHL trade deadline day of March 4, Murray admitted to the media that the club would be "sellers" and had given up hope of making the playoffs. On March 4, Antoine Vermette was traded to the Columbus Blue Jackets for goaltender Pascal Leclaire and a draft pick. Martin Gerber was put on waivers three times and was finally picked up by the Toronto Maple Leafs.

Although the club improved its record under new coach Clouston, including a 10–5–0 record in March, it was not enough to salvage the season. On March 31, following a loss to the Florida Panthers and a win by the Montreal Canadiens, the club was officially eliminated from playoff contention for the first time since 1996.

Although eliminated, the team continued to play well, including a nine-game win streak on home ice. By April 8, the team's record under Clouston was 19–10–3 and he was rewarded with a two-year deal to continue coaching the Senators.

=== Divisional standings ===
Northeast Division
		GP	W	L	OTL	GF	GA	Pts
**1**	**z – Boston Bruins**	**82**	**53**	**19**	**10**	**274**	**196**	**116**
**2**	**Montreal Canadiens**	**82**	**41**	**30**	**11**	**249**	**247**	**93**
3	Buffalo Sabres	82	41	32	9	250	234	91
4	Ottawa Senators	82	36	35	11	217	237	83
5	Toronto Maple Leafs	82	34	35	13	250	293	81

=== Conference standings ===
Eastern Conference
R		Div	GP	W	L	OTL	GF	GA	Pts
**1**	**z – Boston Bruins**	**NE**	**82**	**53**	**19**	**10**	**274**	**196**	116
**2**	**y – Washington Capitals**	**SE**	**82**	**50**	**24**	**8**	**272**	**245**	108
**3**	**y – New Jersey Devils**	**AT**	**82**	**51**	**27**	**4**	**244**	**209**	106
**4**	**Pittsburgh Penguins**	**AT**	**82**	**45**	**28**	**9**	**264**	**239**	99
**5**	**Philadelphia Flyers**	**AT**	**82**	**44**	**27**	**11**	**264**	**238**	99
**6**	**Carolina Hurricanes**	**SE**	**82**	**45**	**30**	**7**	**239**	**226**	97
**7**	**New York Rangers**	**AT**	**82**	**43**	**30**	**9**	**210**	**218**	95
**8**	**Montreal Canadiens**	**NE**	**82**	**41**	**30**	**11**	**249**	**247**	93
8.5
9	Florida Panthers	SE	82	41	30	11	234	231	93
10	Buffalo Sabres	NE	82	41	32	9	250	234	91
11	Ottawa Senators	NE	82	36	35	11	217	237	83
12	Toronto Maple Leafs	NE	82	34	35	13	250	293	81
13	Atlanta Thrashers	SE	82	35	41	6	257	280	76
14	Tampa Bay Lightning	SE	82	24	40	18	210	279	66
15	New York Islanders	AT	82	26	47	9	201	279	61

bold – qualified for playoffs, y – division winner, z – placed first in conference (and division)

AT – Atlantic Division, NE – Northeast Division, SE – Southeast Division

2008–09 Game log
October: 4–5–1 (Home: 1–4–1; Road: 3–1–0)

Game	R	Date	Score	Opponent	Attendance	Recap	Record	Points
1†^{S}	OTL	Sat October 4	3–4	Pittsburgh Penguins	13,699		0–0–1	1
2^{S}	W	Sun October 5	3–1	@ Pittsburgh Penguins	13,699		1–0–1	3
3	L	Sat October 11	2–3	Detroit Red Wings	20,182		1–1–1	3
4	W	Fri October 17	6–3	Phoenix Coyotes	20,179		2–1–1	5
5	L	Sat October 18	2–4	Boston Bruins	19,318		2–2–1	5
6	L	Wed October 22	1–3	Florida Panthers	19,952		2–3–1	5
7	L	Fri October 24	3–4	Anaheim Ducks	19,762		2–4–1	5
8	L	Sat October 25	2–3	@ Toronto Maple Leafs	19,232		2–5–1	5
9	W	Mon October 27	5–2	@ Buffalo Sabres	18,690		3–5–1	7
10	W	Thu October 30	2–1	@ Florida Panthers	13,567		4–5–1	9

November: 4–5–3 (Home: 4–1–1; Road: 0–4–2)

Game	Date	Opponent	Score	Location	Attendance	Record	Points	Recap
11	November 1	Tampa Bay Lightning	3–2 (SO)	Tampa	16,104	4–5–2	10	
12	November 4	Washington Capitals	2–1 (W)	Scotiabank Place	18,485	5–5–2	12	
13	November 6	Philadelphia Flyers	4–1 (W)	Scotiabank Place	18,938	6–5–2	14	
14	November 7	Carolina Hurricanes	2–1 (L)	Raleigh	15,206	6–6–2	14	
15	November 11	Montreal Canadiens	4–0 (L)	Montreal	21,273	6–7–2	14	
16	November 13	New York Islanders	3–1 (L)	Scotiabank Place	19,061	6–8–2	14	
17	November 15	New York Islanders	3–2 (L)	New York	13,722	6–9–2	14	
18	November 17	New York Rangers	2–1 (SO)	New York	18,200	6–9–3	15	
19	November 20	Montreal Canadiens	3–2 (SO)	Scotiabank Place	20,475	6–9–4	16	
20	November 22	New York Rangers	4–1 (W)	Scotiabank Place	19,619	7–9–4	18	
21	November 27	Toronto Maple Leafs	2–1 (W)	Scotiabank Place	19,703	8–9–4	20	
22	November 29	New York Islanders	4–2 (L)	New York	13,108	8–10–4	20	

December: 5–7–1 (Home: 4–1–1; Road: 1–6–0)

Game	Date	Opponent	Score	Location	Attendance	Record	Points	Recap
23	December 3	Atlanta Thrashers	5–1 (W)	Scotiabank Place	17,215	9–10–4	22	
24	December 6	Pittsburgh Penguins	3–2 (W)	Scotiabank Place	19,561	10–10–4	24	
25	December 8	Florida Panthers	4–3 (OT)	Scotiabank Place	17,947	10–10–5	25	
26	December 10	Chicago Blackhawks	2–0 (L)	Chicago	21,614	10–11–5	25	
27	December 12	Washington Capitals	5–1 (L)	Washington	17,973	10–12–5	25	
28	December 13	Tampa Bay Lightning	2–0 (W)	Scotiabank Place	18,446	11–12–5	27	
29	December 16	Atlanta Thrashers	4–1 (L)	Scotiabank Place	18,746	11–13–5	27	
30	December 19	New Jersey Devils	5–1 (L)	Newark	13,242	11–14–5	27	
31	December 20	Dallas Stars	5–4 (W)	Scotiabank Place	19,486	12–14–5	29	
32	December 23	Philadelphia Flyers	6–4 (L)	Philadelphia	19,578	12–15–5	29	
33	December 27	Calgary Flames	6–3 (L)	Calgary	19,289	12–16–5	29	
34	December 28	Vancouver Canucks	3–0 (L)	Vancouver	18,630	12–17–5	29	
35	December 30	Edmonton Oilers	3–2 (W)	Edmonton	16,839	13–17–5	31	

January: 3–6–2 (Home: 2–2–1; Road: 1–4–1)

Game	Date	Opponent	Score	Location	Attendance	Record	Points	Recap
36	January 3	Toronto Maple Leafs	3–1 (L)	Toronto	19,406	13–18–5	31	
37	January 4	New Jersey Devils	4–3 (OT)	Newark	14,798	13–18–6	32	
38	January 6	Buffalo Sabres	4–2 (L)	Buffalo	18,690	13–19–6	32	
39	January 8	Boston Bruins	6–4 (L)	Boston	16,464	13–20–6	32	
40	January 10	New York Rangers	2–0(L)	Scotiabank Place	19,029	13–21–6	32	
41	January 13	Carolina Hurricanes	5–1(W)	Scotiabank Place	18,512	14–21–6	34	
42	January 14	Atlanta Thrashers	3–2(W)	Atlanta	14,163	15–21–6	36	
43	January 17	Montreal Canadiens	4–5(SO)	Scotiabank Place	20,413	15–21–7	37	
44	January 20	Washington Capitals	3–2(W)	Scotiabank Place	20,125	16–21–7	39	
45	January 27	New Jersey Devils	4–1(L)	Scotiabank Place	18,786	16–22–7	39	
46	January 29	St. Louis Blues	3–1(W)	St. Louis	18,639	17–22–7	41	
47	January 30	Columbus Blue Jackets	1–0(L)	Columbus	17,080	17–23–7	41	

February: 6–5–3 (Home: 2–3–2; Road: 4–2–1)

Game	Date	Opponent	Score	Location	Attendance	Record	Points	Recap
48	February 1	Washington Capitals	7–4(L)	Washington	18,277	17–24–7	41	
49	February 3	Los Angeles Kings	1–0(L)	Scotiabank Place	18,054	17–25–7	41	
50	February 5	Boston Bruins	4–3(L-SO)	Scotiabank Place	17,297	17–25–8	42	
51	February 7	Buffalo Sabres	3–2(W-SO)	Scotiabank Place	18,452	18–25–8	44	
52	February 11	Buffalo Sabres	3–1(W)	Buffalo	18,690	19–25–8	46	
53	February 12	Philadelphia Flyers	5–2(W)	Philadelphia	19,679	20–25–8	48	
54	February 14	Minnesota Wild	5–3(W)	Minnesota	18,568	21–25–8	50	
55	February 16	Nashville Predators	2–0(W)	Nashville	14,681	22–25–8	52	
56	February 17	Colorado Avalanche	3–2(L-OT)	Denver	15,237	22–25–9	53	
57	February 19	Vancouver Canucks	5–2(L)	Scotiabank Place	19,716	22–26–9	53	
58	February 21	Montreal Canadiens	5–3(L)	Montreal	21,723	22–27–9	53	
59	February 24	Carolina Hurricanes	4–2(W)	Scotiabank Place	16,541	23–27–9	55	
60	February 26	San Jose Sharks	2–1(L)	Scotiabank Place	17,791	23–28–9	55	
61	February 28	Toronto Maple Leafs	4–3(L-OT)	Scotiabank Place	20,050	23–28–10	56	

March: 10–5–0 (Home: 7–1–0; Road: 3–4–0)

Game	Date	Opponent	Score	Location	Attendance	Record	Points	Recap
62	March 3	Calgary Flames	6–3(L)	Scotiabank Place	18,865	23–29–10	56	
63	March 5	Edmonton Oilers	4–2(W)	Scotiabank Place	17,904	24–29–10	58	
64	March 7	Buffalo Sabres	6–3(W)	Scotiabank Place	18,444	25–29–10	60	
65	March 9	Toronto Maple Leafs	2–1(W)	Scotiabank Place	18,898	26–29–10	62	
66	March 11	Tampa Bay Lightning	3–2(W-OT)	Scotiabank Place	19,231	27–29–10	64	
67	March 12	Boston Bruins	5–3(L)	Boston	17,022	27–30–10	64	
68	March 14	Pittsburgh Penguins	4–3(W-SO)	Pittsburgh	17,132	28–30–10	66	
69	March 17	Buffalo Sabres	4–2(W)	Scotiabank Place	20,053	29–30–10	68	
70	March 19	Montreal Canadiens	5–4(W)	Scotiabank Place	20,500	30–30–10	70	
71	March 21	New York Islanders	5–2(W)	Scotiabank Place	19,751	31–30–10	72	
72	March 22	New York Rangers	2–1(W)	New York	18,200	32–30–10	74	
73	March 25	Carolina Hurricanes	2–1(L)	Carolina	17,146	32–31–10	74	
74	March 28	Atlanta Thrashers	6–3(L)	Atlanta	17,053	32–32–10	74	
75	March 29	Tampa Bay Lightning	3–0(W)	Tampa Bay	16,427	33–32–10	76	
76	March 31	Florida Panthers	5–2(L)	Florida	15,247	33–33–10	76	

April: 3–2–1 (Home: 2–0–1; Road: 1–2–0)

Game	Date	Opponent	Score	Location	Attendance	Record	Points	Recap
77	April 2	Boston Bruins	2–1(L)	Boston	17,565	33–34–10	76	
78	April 4	Philadelphia Flyers	4–3(W-SO)	Scotiabank Place	19,557	34–34–10	78	
79	April 6	Montreal Canadiens	3–2(W)	Montreal	21,273	35–34–10	80	
80	April 7	Boston Bruins	3–2(W)	Scotiabank Place	19,053	36–34–10	82	
81	April 9	New Jersey Devils	3-2(L-SO)	Scotiabank Place	20,151	36–34–11	83	
82	April 11	Toronto Maple Leafs	5–2(L)	Toronto	19,370	36–35–11	83	

**Legend**: Win (2 points) Loss (0 points) Overtime/shootout loss (1 point)
@ Indicates away game. ^{S} Played at Scandinavium Arena, Stockholm, SE. † First game in Sweden is considered a "home" game.

== Player statistics ==
=== Skaters ===
Regular season

Player	GP	G	A	Pts	+/−	PIM
Daniel Alfredsson	79	24	50	74	+7	24
Jason Spezza	82	32	41	73	-14	79
Dany Heatley	82	39	33	72	-11	88
Filip Kuba	71	3	37	40	+4	28
Mike Fisher	78	13	19	32	0	66
Nick Foligno	81	17	15	32	-10	59
Antoine Vermette^{‡}	62	9	19	28	-12	42
Chris Kelly	82	12	11	23	-10	38
Chris Phillips	82	6	16	22	-14	66
Jarkko Ruutu	78	7	14	21	0	144
Brendan Bell	53	6	15	21	-5	24
Ryan Shannon	35	8	12	20	-1	2
Jesse Winchester	76	3	15	18	0	33
Alexandre Picard	47	6	8	14	-2	8
Brian Lee	53	2	11	13	-2	33
Chris Campoli^{†}	25	5	8	13	+4	12
Shean Donovan	65	5	5	10	-2	34
Chris Neil	60	3	7	10	-13	146
Anton Volchenkov	68	2	8	10	-10	36
Dean McAmmond^{‡}	44	3	4	7	+2	16
Mike Comrie^{†}	22	3	4	7	-7	6
Christoph Schubert	50	3	3	6	-8	26
Peter Regin	11	1	1	2	0	2
Ilya Zubov	10	0	2	2	-1	0
Jason Smith	63	1	0	1	-3	47
Cody Bass	12	0	0	0	-2	15
Luke Richardson^{#}	2	0	0	0	-3	2
Matt Carkner	1	0	0	0	0	0
Josh Hennessy	1	0	0	0	0	0
Zack Smith	1	0	0	0	0	0

=== Goaltenders ===
Regular season

Player	GP	Min	W	L	OT	GA	GAA	SA	SV	Sv%	SO
Alex Auld	43	2449	16	18	7	101	2.47	1141	1040	.911	1
Brian Elliott	31	1667	16	8	3	77	2.77	786	709	.902	1
Martin Gerber^{‡}	14	839	4	9	1	40	2.86	397	357	.899	1

^{#}Retired.
^{†}Denotes player spent time with another team before joining Senators. Stats reflect time with Senators only.
^{‡}Traded mid-season.

Note:

Pos = Position;GP = Games played; G = Goals; A = Assists; Pts = Points; PIM = Penalty minutes; +/- = Plus/minus; PPG = Power-play goals; SHG = Short-handed goals; GWG = Game-winning goals
Pos = Position;GP = Games played; Min, TOI = Minutes played; W = Wins; L = Losses; T,T/OT = Ties; OTL = Overtime losses; GA = Goals-against; GAA = Goals-against average; SO = Shutouts; SA = Shots against; SV = Shots saved;SV% = Save percentage;

== Playoffs ==
The Senators attempted to make the playoffs for the 12th straight season. Prior to the season, a majority of predictions by the media placed the Senators to enter the playoffs as the fourth seed or lower. Some, including The Hockey News' Adam Proteau, placed the team to miss the playoffs altogether. However, if they make the playoffs, Proteau plans to

“Commission a musical mash-up consisting of Alanis Morissette and Paul Anka music – and Tom Green's short-lived professional rap career – and listen to it on repeat for an entire drive from Toronto to Ottawa. And back, even.”

The Hockey News, December 11, 2008

After changing coaches and improving play, the Senators were not able to qualify for the playoffs. On March 31, the Senators were mathematically eliminated from the playoff race.

== Awards and records ==
=== Records ===
- NHL record for consecutive team games with assists from the start of a season by a defenseman (8) – Filip Kuba.
- March 5, 2009 – Jason Spezza scored at 0:12 of the first period to set a new Senators record for the fastest goal from the start of a game.
- April 7, 2009 – Team won ninth consecutive home game to set new team record.

=== Milestones ===
Regular season
Player	Milestone	Reached
Chris Phillips	700th NHL game	October 4, 2008
Filip Kuba	First assist with Ottawa; First point with Ottawa	October 4, 2008
Alex Auld	First game with Ottawa; First start with Ottawa; First win with Ottawa	October 5, 2008
Alexandre Picard	First goal with Ottawa; First point with Ottawa	October 11, 2008
Chris Kelly	100th career point	October 18, 2008
Alexandre Picard	100th NHL game	October 25, 2008
Dany Heatley	291st career point with Ottawa (passing Shawn McEachern for 7th on Senators' all-time point scoring list)	November 6, 2008
Jesse Winchester	First NHL goal	November 6, 2008
Zack Smith	First NHL game	November 29, 2008
Brendan Bell	First goal with Ottawa; First assist with Ottawa; First point with Ottawa	December 3, 2008
Jason Spezza	Second career Hat-Trick	December 6, 2008
Dany Heatley	500th career point	December 20, 2008
Jason Smith	First goal with Ottawa; First point with Ottawa	December 20, 2008
Martin Gerber	100th game in net for Ottawa^{A}	January 8, 2009
Mike Fisher	500th regular-season NHL game	January 13, 2009
Peter Regin	First NHL game	January 20, 2009
Peter Regin	First NHL goal	January 29, 2009
Daniel Alfredsson	900th regular-season NHL game	February 1, 2009
Shean Donovan	900th regular-season NHL game	February 14, 2009
Jason Spezza	391st point with Senators (passing Marian Hossa for fifth on Senators' all-time point scoring list)	February 14, 2009
Jason Smith	1,000th regular-season NHL game	February 17, 2009
Daniel Alfredsson	350th NHL goal	March 7, 2009
Jason Spezza	400th point with Senators (passing Radek Bonk for fourth on Senators' all-time point scoring list)	March 11, 2009
Brian Elliott	First NHL shutout.	March 29, 2009

- ^{A}Later demoted to Binghamton and released on waivers, it was also his last game with Ottawa.

== Transactions ==
- May 29, 2008 - re-signed Jesse Winchester
- June 2, 2008 - signed Peter Regin to entry-level contract.
- June 13, 2008 - signed Craig Hartsburg to a three-year contract.
- June 18, 2008 - re-signed Matt Carkner to a two-year contract.
- June 20, 2008 - placed Ray Emery on waivers. (bought out)
- June 20, 2008 - re-signed Chris Kelly
- July 1, 2008 - signed Alex Auld to two-year contract
- July 2, 2008 - re-signed Shean Donovan
- July 2, 2008 - signed Jarkko Ruutu
- July 7, 2008 - re-signed Greg Mauldin to a one-year, two-way contract.
- July 8, 2008 - signed Jason Smith
- July 11, 2008 - signed Mitchell O'Keefe to a one-year, entry-level contract.
- July 11, 2008 - signed Brendan Bell to a one-year, two-way contract.
- July 11, 2008 - signed Curtis Hunt to a three-year contract.
- July 28, 2008 - re-signed Jeff Glass to a one-year, two-way contract.
- July 29, 2008 - re-signed Josh Hennessy to a two-year, two-way contract.
- July 31, 2008 - re-signed Antoine Vermette to a two-year contract.
- August 11, 2008 - re-signed Geoff Waugh to a one-year, two-way contract.
- August 14, 2008 - signed Zack Smith to an entry-level contract.
- September 4, 2008 - signed Brad Isbister to a one-year, two-way contract.
- September 27, 2008 - re-signed Luke Richardson to a one-year, two-way contract.
- September 27, 2008 - assigned Brad Isbister to Binghamton. Isbister declined and was loaned to EV Zug on October 4.
- October 30, 2008 - re-signed Daniel Alfredsson to a four-year contract extension.
- November 27, 2008 - placed Luke Richardson on waivers. (retired)
- January 22, 2009 - placed Martin Gerber on waivers. (assigned to Binghamton)
- February 2, 2009 - fire Craig Hartsburg as head coach, elevate Cory Clouston to head coach.
- March 4, 2009 - re-signed Filip Kuba to three-year contract extension at $3.7 million per season.
- March 9, 2009 - signed free agent Craig Schira to three-year entry-level contract.

Source: senators.nhl.com

=== Trades ===
June 20, 2008	To Nashville Predators 1st-round pick (18th overall) in 2008; 3rd-round pick in 2009	To Ottawa Senators 1st-round pick (15th overall) in 2008
June 25, 2008	To Phoenix Coyotes Brian McGrattan	To Ottawa Senators 5th-round pick in 2009
August 29, 2008	To Tampa Bay Lightning Andrej Meszaros	To Ottawa Senators 1st-round pick in 2009; Filip Kuba; Alexandre Picard
September 2, 2008	To Vancouver Canucks Lawrence Nycholat	To Ottawa Senators Ryan Shannon
November 1, 2008	To Phoenix Coyotes Alexander Nikulin	To Ottawa Senators Drew Fata
February 20, 2009	To New York Islanders Dean McAmmond; 1st-round pick in 2009	To Ottawa Senators Mike Comrie; Chris Campoli
March 4, 2009	To Columbus Blue Jackets Antoine Vermette	To Ottawa Senators Pascal Leclaire; 2nd-round pick in 2009

=== Free agent acquisitions ===
Player	Former team	Contract terms
Alex Auld	Boston Bruins	2 years, $2 million
Jarkko Ruutu	Pittsburgh Penguins	3 years, $3.9 million
Jason Smith	Philadelphia Flyers	2 years, $5.2 million
Brendan Bell	Phoenix Coyotes	1 year
Mitchell O'Keefe	Ferris State University, Iowa Stars	1 year
Brad Isbister	Vancouver Canucks	1 year

=== Players lost to free agency ===
Player	New team
Mike Commodore	Columbus Blue Jackets
Wade Redden	New York Rangers
Cory Stillman	Florida Panthers
Randy Robitaille	HC Lugano

=== Waivers ===
Player	Former team	New team	Date claimed off waivers
Martin Gerber	Ottawa Senators	Toronto Maple Leafs	March 4, 2009

== Draft picks ==
Ottawa's picks at the 2008 NHL entry draft in Ottawa, Ontario.

Round	Pick	Player	Position	Nationality	Club team
1	15	Erik Karlsson	Defence	Sweden	Frolunda HC (J20 SuperElit)
2	42	Patrick Wiercioch	Defence	Canada	Omaha Lancers (USHL)
3	79	Zack Smith	Center	Canada	Swift Current Broncos (WHL)
4	109	Andre Petersson	Forward	Sweden	HV71 (J20 SuperElit)
4	119	Derek Grant	Center	Canada	Langley Chiefs (BCHL)
5	139	Mark Borowiecki	Defence	Canada	Smiths Falls Bears (CJHL)
7	199	Emil Sandin	Forward	Sweden	Brynas IF (J20 SuperElit)

== Farm teams ==
- Binghamton Senators (American Hockey League)
- Elmira Jackals (ECHL)

The Senators continued their affiliation with the Binghamton Senators of the American Hockey League (AHL) and added an affiliation agreement with the Elmira Jackals of the ECHL. In previous years, Elmira had accepted players from Binghamton on a player-by-player basis. The new agreement formalized the arrangement of Elmira as the primary affiliate of Binghamton and the secondary affiliate of Ottawa.

== See also ==
- 2008–09 NHL season
