= List of Ottawa Senators seasons =

The Ottawa Senators are a professional ice hockey team based in Ottawa. The team is a member of the Atlantic Division of the Eastern Conference of the National Hockey League (NHL).

The Senators were granted a franchise in 1990. The team participated in the 1992 NHL expansion draft and the 1992 NHL entry draft and began play in the 1992–93 season. Until 1996, the Senators played in the Ottawa Civic Centre. In 1996, the Senators opened the new Palladium, since renamed the Corel Centre, Scotiabank Place and Canadian Tire Centre. The team finished last overall in the league during its first four seasons. After a changing the management and head coach, the Senators appeared in the Stanley Cup playoffs for the first time in 1997.

The Senators won the Presidents' Trophy in the 2002–03 season for placing first in the league overall during the regular season, but they were defeated in the Eastern Conference finals. During the 2004–05 season, the team operated its affiliated teams and office, but the team itself did not play due to the 2004–05 NHL lockout. The team advanced to the Stanley Cup Final in the 2006–07 season but lost in five games. In 2016–17, the Senators advanced to the Eastern Conference finals again, but lost in seven games.

== Table key ==
Key of colors and symbols
Color/symbol	Explanation
†	Stanley Cup champions
‡	Conference champions
↑	Division champions
#	Led league in points

Key of terms and abbreviations
Term or abbreviation	Definition
Finish	Final position in division or league standings
GP	Number of games played
W	Number of wins
L	Number of losses
T	Number of ties
OT	Number of losses in overtime (since the 1999–2000 season)
Pts	Number of points
GF	Goals for (goals scored by the Senators)
GA	Goals against (goals scored by the Senators' opponents)
—	Does not apply

== Year by year ==
Season	Senators season	Conference	Division	Regular season									Postseason					
Season	Senators season	Conference	Division	Finish	GP	W	L	T	OT	Pts	GF	GA	GP	W	L	GF	GA	Result
1992–93	1992–93	Wales	Adams	6th	84	10	70	4	—	24	202	395	—	—	—	—	—	Did not qualify
1993–94	1993–94	Eastern	Northeast	7th	84	14	61	9	—	37	201	397	—	—	—	—	—	Did not qualify
1994–95^{[a]}	1994–95	Eastern	Northeast	7th	48	9	34	5	—	23	117	174	—	—	—	—	—	Did not qualify
1995–96	1995–96	Eastern	Northeast	6th	82	18	59	5	—	41	191	291	—	—	—	—	—	Did not qualify
1996–97	1996–97	Eastern	Northeast	3rd	82	31	36	15	—	77	226	234	7	3	4	13	14	Lost in conference quarterfinals, 3–4 (Sabres)
1997–98	1997–98	Eastern	Northeast	5th	82	34	33	15	—	83	193	200	11	5	6	20	30	Won in conference quarterfinals, 4–2 (Devils); Lost in conference semifinals, 1–4 (Capitals)
1998–99	1998–99	Eastern	Northeast↑	1st	82	44	23	15	—	103	239	179	4	0	4	6	12	Lost in conference quarterfinals, 0–4 (Sabres)
1999–2000^{[b]}	1999–2000	Eastern	Northeast	2nd	82	41	28	11	2	95	244	210	6	2	4	10	17	Lost in conference quarterfinals, 2–4 (Maple Leafs)
2000–01	2000–01	Eastern	Northeast↑	1st	82	48	21	9	4	109	274	205	4	0	4	3	10	Lost in conference quarterfinals, 0–4 (Maple Leafs)
2001–02	2001–02	Eastern	Northeast	3rd	82	39	27	9	7	94	243	208	12	7	5	29	18	Won in conference quarterfinals, 4–1 (Flyers); Lost in conference semifinals, 3–4 (Maple Leafs)
2002–03	2002–03	Eastern	Northeast↑	1st	82	52	21	8	1	113#	263	182	18	11	7	43	34	Won in conference quarterfinals, 4–1 (Islanders); Won in conference semifinals, 4–2 (Flyers); Lost in conference finals, 3–4 (Devils)
2003–04	2003–04	Eastern	Northeast	3rd	82	43	23	10	6	102	262	189	7	3	4	11	14	Lost in conference quarterfinals, 3–4 (Maple Leafs)
2004–05^{[c]}	2004–05	Season cancelled due to 2004–05 NHL Lockout																
2005–06^{[d]}	2005–06	Eastern	Northeast↑	1st	82	52	21	—	9	113	314	211	10	5	5	36	29	Won in conference quarterfinals, 4–1 (Lightning); Lost in conference semifinals, 1–4 (Sabres)
2006–07	2006–07	Eastern‡	Northeast	2nd	82	48	25	—	9	105	288	222	20	13	7	59	47	Won in conference quarterfinals, 4–1 (Penguins); Won in conference semifinals, 4–1 (Devils); Won in conference finals, 4–1 (Sabres); Lost in Stanley Cup Final, 1–4 (Ducks)
2007–08	2007–08	Eastern	Northeast	2nd	82	43	31	—	8	94	261	247	4	0	4	5	16	Lost in conference quarterfinals, 0–4 (Penguins)
2008–09	2008–09	Eastern	Northeast	4th	82	36	35	—	11	83	217	237	—	—	—	—	—	Did not qualify
2009–10	2009–10	Eastern	Northeast	2nd	82	44	32	—	6	94	225	238	6	2	4	19	24	Lost in conference quarterfinals, 2–4 (Penguins)
2010–11	2010–11	Eastern	Northeast	5th	82	32	40	—	10	74	192	250	—	—	—	—	—	Did not qualify
2011–12	2011–12	Eastern	Northeast	2nd	82	41	31	—	10	92	249	240	7	3	4	13	14	Lost in conference quarterfinals, 3–4 (Rangers)
2012–13^{[e]}	2012–13	Eastern	Northeast	4th	48	25	17	—	6	56	116	104	10	5	5	31	31	Won in conference quarterfinals, 4–1 (Canadiens); Lost in conference semifinals, 1–4 (Penguins)
2013–14	2013–14	Eastern	Atlantic	5th	82	37	31	—	14	88	236	265	—	—	—	—	—	Did not qualify
2014–15	2014–15	Eastern	Atlantic	4th	82	43	26	—	13	99	238	215	6	2	4	12	12	Lost in first round, 2–4 (Canadiens)
2015–16	2015–16	Eastern	Atlantic	5th	82	38	35	—	9	85	236	247	—	—	—	—	—	Did not qualify
2016–17	2016–17	Eastern	Atlantic	2nd	82	44	28	—	10	98	212	214	19	11	8	47	50	Won in first round, 4–2 (Bruins); Won in second round, 4–2 (Rangers); Lost in conference finals, 3–4 (Penguins)
2017–18	2017–18	Eastern	Atlantic	7th	82	28	43	—	11	67	221	291	—	—	—	—	—	Did not qualify
2018–19	2018–19	Eastern	Atlantic	8th	82	29	47	—	6	64	242	302	—	—	—	—	—	Did not qualify
2019–20^{[f]}	2019–20	Eastern	Atlantic	7th	71	25	34	—	12	62	191	243	—	—	—	—	—	Did not qualify
2020–21^{[g]}	2020–21	Eastern	North	6th	56	23	28	—	5	51	157	190	—	—	—	—	—	Did not qualify
2021–22	2021–22	Eastern	Atlantic	7th	82	33	42	—	7	73	227	266	—	—	—	—	—	Did not qualify
2022–23	2022–23	Eastern	Atlantic	6th	82	39	35	—	8	86	261	271	—	—	—	—	—	Did not qualify
2023–24	2023–24	Eastern	Atlantic	7th	82	37	41	—	4	78	255	281	—	—	—	—	—	Did not qualify
2024–25	2024–25	Eastern	Atlantic	4th	82	45	30	—	7	97	243	234	6	2	4	16	19	Lost in first round, 2–4 (Maple Leafs)
2025–26	2025–26	Eastern	Atlantic	5th	82	44	27	—	11	99	278	246	4	0	4	5	11	Lost in first round, 0–4 (Hurricanes)
Totals					2,605	1,169	1,115	115	206	2,659	7,514	7,878	161	74	87	378	402	18 playoff appearances

- ^{a} The season was shortened to 48 games because of the 1994–95 NHL lockout.
- ^{b} Beginning with the 1999–2000 season, teams received one point for losing a regular-season game in overtime.
- ^{c} The season was cancelled because of the 2004–05 NHL lockout.
- ^{d} Prior to the 2005–06 season, the NHL instituted a penalty shootout for regular-season games that remained tied after a five-minute overtime period, which prevented ties.
- ^{e} The season was shortened to 48 games because of the 2012–13 NHL lockout.
- ^{f} The season was suspended on March 12, 2020 because of the COVID-19 pandemic.
- ^{g} Due to the COVID-19 pandemic, the 2020–21 NHL season was shortened to 56 games.

=== All-time records ===
Statistic	GP	W	L	T	OT
Regular season record (1992–present)	2,605	1,169	1,115	115	206
Postseason record (1992–present)	161	74	87	—	—
All-time regular and postseason record	2,680	1,243	1,202	115	206
All-time series record: 11–18

== See also ==
- List of Ottawa Senators (original) seasons
