= 2008–09 Boston Bruins season =

NHL team season

2008–09 Boston Bruins
- Northeast Division champions
- Division: 1st Northeast
- Conference: 1st Eastern
- 2008–09 record: 53–19–10
- Home record: 29–6–6
- Road record: 24–13–4
- Goals for: 274
- Goals against: 196

Team information
- General manager: Peter Chiarelli
- Coach: Claude Julien
- Captain: Zdeno Chara
- Alternate captains: Patrice Bergeron; Rotating; P. J. Axelsson; Andrew Ference; Marco Sturm; Stephane Yelle
- Arena: TD Banknorth Garden
- Average attendance: 17,039 (97.0%); Total: 698,638

Team leaders
- Goals: Phil Kessel (36)
- Assists: Marc Savard (63)
- Points: Marc Savard (88)
- Penalty minutes: Milan Lucic (136)
- Plus/minus: David Krejci (+37)
- Wins: Tim Thomas (36)
- Goals against average: Tim Thomas (2.10)

The 2008–09 Boston Bruins season was the Bruins' 85th season in the National Hockey League (NHL). Their regular season began on the road on October 9, 2008, in Denver versus the Colorado Avalanche and concluded on April 12, 2009, against the New York Islanders. The Bruins looked to improve upon the accomplishments of the 2007–08 season, which included Boston's return to the Stanley Cup Playoffs for the first time since the 2003–04 season.

Marc Savard again led the team in scoring for the regular season, his 88 points good for ninth in the league. Tim Thomas led all goaltenders in both save percentage and goals against at season's end, while sophomore sensation David Krejci led the league in plus-minus, narrowly beating out rookie teammate Blake Wheeler.

The Bruins claimed their first division title since 2004 and clinched top seed in the East for the first time since 2002.

== Season events ==
"I’m not big on going out there and making those big declarations, or comments, but I think we can go as far as we believe we can go."

— Claude Julien, prior to the 2008–09 season

Arguably the two biggest events to occur during the Bruins' off-season were the acquisition of Montreal Canadiens forward Michael Ryder, a noted 30-goal scorer, and Blake Wheeler, a promising 21-year-old from the University of Minnesota. Twelve-year veteran Stephane Yelle was another strong addition to the roster. Added to a line-up featuring young stars such as Phil Kessel and Milan Lucic, the return of Patrice Bergeron, the improved goaltending of veteran Tim Thomas and coming off the back of an impressive post-season, expectations were high for the team.

=== Preseason ===
The Bruins pre-season saw the team compete in eight games over a two-week period. The team played two games each against the Montreal Canadiens, the New York Islanders, the Washington Capitals and the defending Stanley Cup champions, the Detroit Red Wings. Boston maintained a 3–4–1 record through the pre-season with victories against the Canadiens, Capitals and Red Wings, including an impressive 8–3 victory over arch-rivals Montreal in their first match-up.

=== October ===
On October 9, the Bruins opened their regular season against the Colorado Avalanche, at the Pepsi Center. The Bruins notched a 5–4 victory and celebrated the return of centre Patrice Bergeron, playing his first NHL game in almost a year, while Blake Wheeler scored his first NHL goal on debut. The team would go on to lose its next two games, including a shootout loss to their rivals, the Montreal Canadiens.

The Bruins home opener took place on October 20, with the team suffering another shootout defeat, this time to the Pittsburgh Penguins. Boston secured its first home victory of the season on October 25, against the Atlanta Thrashers in what proved to be a memorable game, with the teams switching ends at the first stoppage in play after the 10-minute mark of the period due to incorrect markings on the West End (visitors bench side) of the TD Banknorth Garden ice. Winger Milan Lucic recorded his first NHL hat trick in the game, also adding an assist in the 5–4 victory.

On October 27, in Edmonton in overtime and October 28 in Vancouver, Tim Thomas became the first Boston goaltender with consecutive shutouts since April 3–5, 1999 (Byron Dafoe), and only the second goaltender in NHL history to record consecutive 1–0 shutouts on the road (Florida's Craig Anderson, March 2–4, 2008).

The Bruins ended October with a loss to the Calgary Flames on the road, and finished the month with a 5–3–3 record.

=== November–December ===
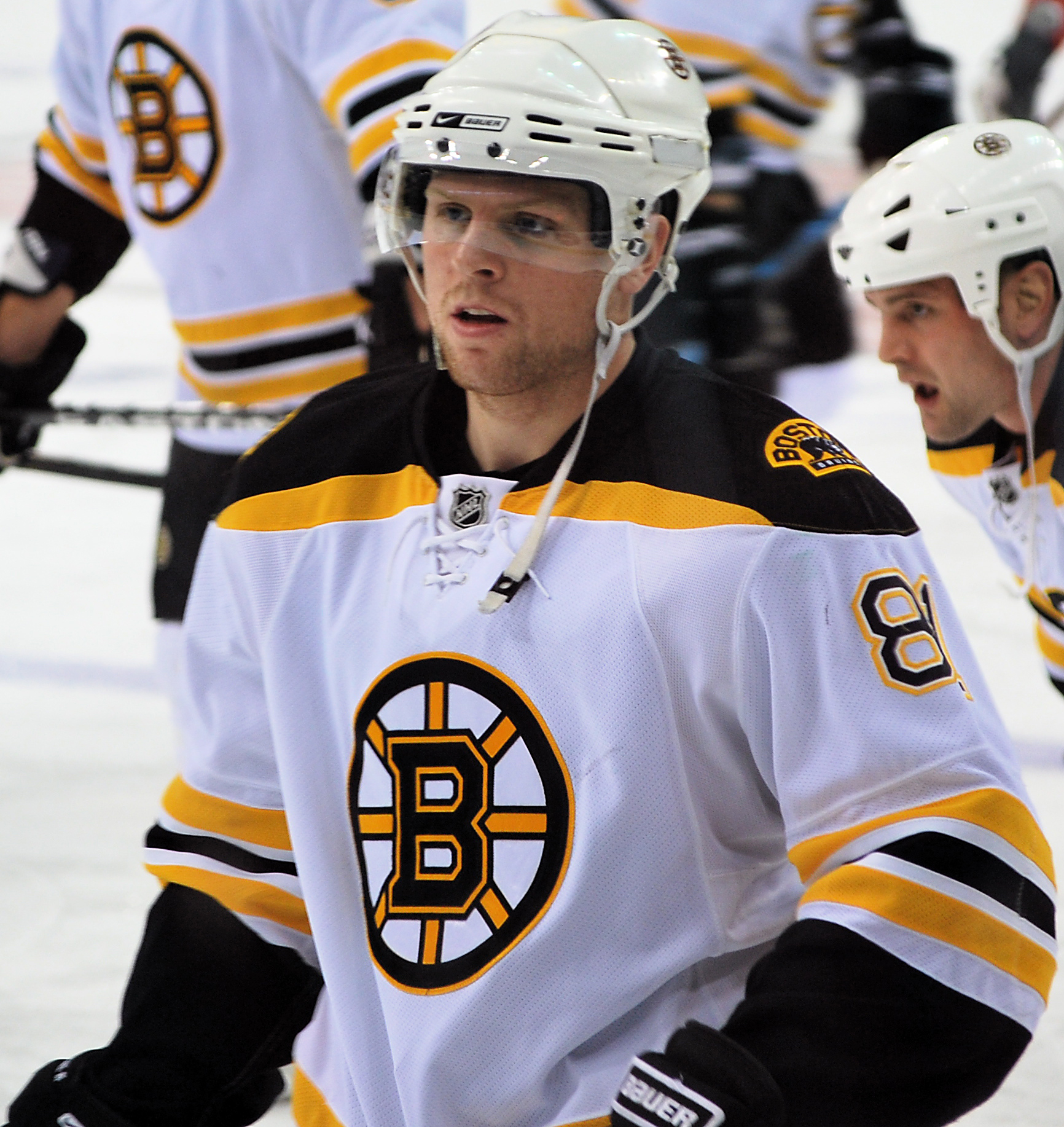
Phil Kessel equalled the longest point streak by a U.S.-born player in NHL history.

The Bruins opened the month of November with a 5–1 victory at home, in what proved to be a particularly physical match against the Dallas Stars. The game would prove a turning point for the team, with many players citing it as the catalyst that would see the team go on to win their next 12 games at home. One of those wins was a convincing 6–1 victory over the Montreal Canadiens on November 13. This would spark a winning streak against the Canadiens similar to that of the streak that Montreal had against the Bruins in the previous season.

On November 6, in a 5–2 victory against the Toronto Maple Leafs, Blake Wheeler recorded his first NHL hat trick, while Captain Zdeno Chara celebrated his 700th NHL game. In the return leg, on November 17, Matt Hunwick scored his first NHL goal as the Bruins once again defeated the Maple Leafs. Two days later, Marc Savard would secure his 600th NHL point with a goal and three assists in the Bruins' 7–4 win against the Buffalo Sabres. On December 18, centre David Krejci recorded his first NHL hat trick in an 8–5 win against Toronto. Phil Kessel also scored two goals in the match, his second bringing up his 100th career point.

Boston finished the month of November with an 11–1–1 record, including an 8–0–0 record at home. They would carry that form through the month of December, finishing with a remarkable 12–1–0 record and remaining undefeated at TD Garden (4–0–0). Phil Kessel maintained an 18-game point streak from November 13 to December 21, the longest such streak overall for the season and equalling Ed Olczyk's record for the longest point streak by an American-born player in NHL history. The biggest concern during this period was the loss of forward Patrice Bergeron, the young centre sustaining his second concussion in 14 months, after a heavy collision with the Carolina Hurricanes' Dennis Seidenberg. Bergeron would go on to miss the next 15 games.

=== January ===
Boston would begin 2009 in the same manner with which they ended 2008 – with a victory over the defending Eastern Conference champions, the Pittsburgh Penguins. The victory, their 10th in a row and 14th-straight at home, secured the team's longest streak since March 9–28, 1973, and catapulted the Bruins to the top spot in the NHL with 62 points, one more than the San Jose Sharks.

From January 12 to 29, forward Phil Kessel was sidelined with mononucleosis. On January 13, Marco Sturm was lost for the season after undergoing surgery for an injury incurred on December 18 against the Toronto Maple Leafs. On January 27, Patrice Bergeron would make his second return from concussion in as many seasons, tallying an assist in the Bruins 3–2 overtime victory against the Washington Capitals. On January 31, Tuukka Rask, recalled from the Providence Bruins, played his first game with the Bruins for the season and recorded his first NHL shutout, stopping all 35 shots in a 1–0 victory against the New York Rangers.

==== All-Star weekend ====
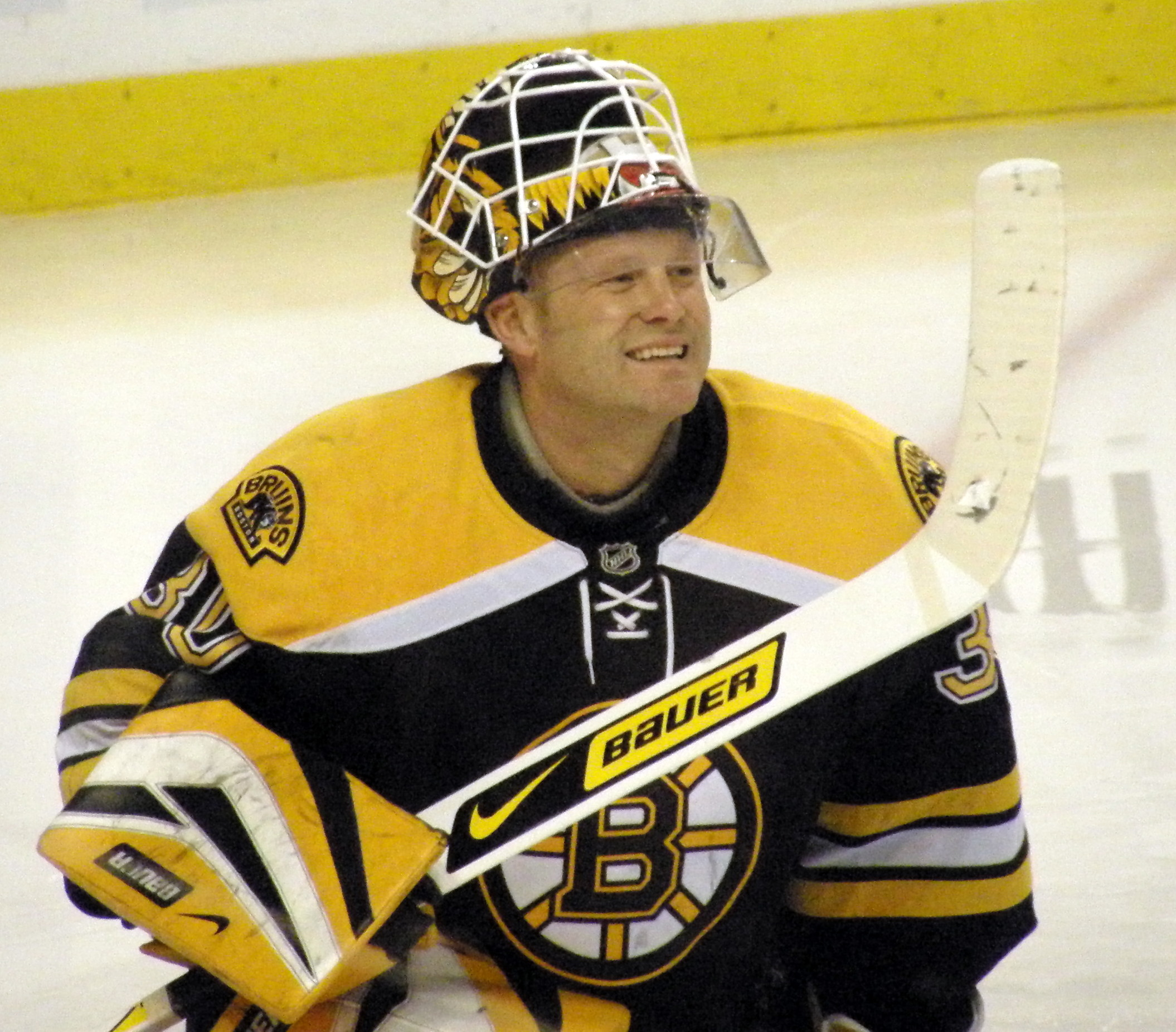
Tim Thomas, winner of the 2008–09 William M. Jennings Trophy

Three Bruins were assigned to the Eastern Conference for the 57th National Hockey League All-Star Game, with Zdeno Chara, Marc Savard and Tim Thomas all representing Boston as reserves. Coach Claude Julien was also named as head coach ahead of Montreal counterpart, Guy Carbonneau. Over the course of the weekend, Blake Wheeler was named MVP of the YoungStars game with a four-goal performance, Zdeno Chara recorded the hardest ever shot (105.4 mph) in the SuperSkills Competition, while Chara, Savard and Thomas celebrated victory in the All-Star Game, with Savard tallying three assists while Thomas was awarded the win for his efforts in both the overtime and shootout periods.

=== March ===
On March 4, the Bruins acquired defenseman Steve Montador from the Anaheim Ducks in exchange for forward Petteri Nokelainen. Later that day, the club announced the acquisition of forward Mark Recchi and a second round draft pick in the 2010 NHL entry draft from the Tampa Bay Lightning in exchange for defenseman Matt Lashoff and forward Martins Karsums. Three days later, on March 7, Recchi scored a pair of goals in his second outing for the Bruins, against the Chicago Blackhawks.

The Bruins secured their second successive playoff berth on March 21, when the Florida Panthers lost to the Columbus Blue Jackets. The following night, they secured the Northeast Division title with a 4–1 victory against Eastern rivals the New Jersey Devils.

=== April ===
On April 2, against the Ottawa Senators, Boston recorded their 50th win for the season, the eighth time in franchise history and first since 1992–93 that the mark had been achieved. Prior to the match, David Krejci was the recipient of NESN's Seventh Player Award, the annual award presented to the Bruin who went above and beyond the call of duty and exceed the expectations of Bruins fans during the season.

== Standings ==
=== Divisional standings ===
Northeast Division
		GP	W	L	OTL	GF	GA	Pts
**1**	**z – Boston Bruins**	**82**	**53**	**19**	**10**	**274**	**196**	**116**
**2**	**Montreal Canadiens**	**82**	**41**	**30**	**11**	**249**	**247**	**93**
3	Buffalo Sabres	82	41	32	9	250	234	91
4	Ottawa Senators	82	36	35	11	217	237	83
5	Toronto Maple Leafs	82	34	35	13	250	293	81

=== Conference standings ===
Eastern Conference
R		Div	GP	W	L	OTL	GF	GA	Pts
**1**	**z – Boston Bruins**	**NE**	**82**	**53**	**19**	**10**	**274**	**196**	116
**2**	**y – Washington Capitals**	**SE**	**82**	**50**	**24**	**8**	**272**	**245**	108
**3**	**y – New Jersey Devils**	**AT**	**82**	**51**	**27**	**4**	**244**	**209**	106
**4**	**Pittsburgh Penguins**	**AT**	**82**	**45**	**28**	**9**	**264**	**239**	99
**5**	**Philadelphia Flyers**	**AT**	**82**	**44**	**27**	**11**	**264**	**238**	99
**6**	**Carolina Hurricanes**	**SE**	**82**	**45**	**30**	**7**	**239**	**226**	97
**7**	**New York Rangers**	**AT**	**82**	**43**	**30**	**9**	**210**	**218**	95
**8**	**Montreal Canadiens**	**NE**	**82**	**41**	**30**	**11**	**249**	**247**	93
8.5
9	Florida Panthers	SE	82	41	30	11	234	231	93
10	Buffalo Sabres	NE	82	41	32	9	250	234	91
11	Ottawa Senators	NE	82	36	35	11	217	237	83
12	Toronto Maple Leafs	NE	82	34	35	13	250	293	81
13	Atlanta Thrashers	SE	82	35	41	6	257	280	76
14	Tampa Bay Lightning	SE	82	24	40	18	210	279	66
15	New York Islanders	AT	82	26	47	9	201	279	61

bold – qualified for playoffs, y – division winner, z – placed first in conference (and division)

AT – Atlantic Division, NE – Northeast Division, SE – Southeast Division

== Schedule and results ==
=== Preseason ===
2008 pre-season
#	Date	Visitor	Score	Home	OT	Decision	Attendance	Record	Recap
1	September 22	Boston Bruins	8–3	Montreal Canadiens^{1}		Kevin Regan	7,792	1–0–0
2	September 23	Boston Bruins	1–2	New York Islanders^{2}	OT	Tuukka Rask	3,278	1–0–1
3	September 25	Boston Bruins	3–4	Detroit Red Wings^{1}		—	—	1–1–1
4	September 26	Boston Bruins	2–1	Detroit Red Wings		Tuukka Rask	15,266	2–1–1
5	September 27	Washington Capitals	4–3	Boston Bruins		Tim Thomas	13,660	2–2–1
6	October 1	Boston Bruins	1–3	Montreal Canadiens		Manny Fernandez	21,173	2–3–1
7	October 4	New York Islanders	3–1	Boston Bruins		Tim Thomas	12,428	2–4–1
8	October 5	Boston Bruins	5–4	Washington Capitals	SO	Manny Fernandez	14,585	3–4–1
Match played at Metro Center in Halifax, Nova Scotia.; Match played at Moncton Coliseum in Moncton, New Brunswick.

=== Regular season ===
The Bruins allowed only 190 goals (excluding 6 shootout goals), the fewest among all 30 teams.

2008–09 game log

October: 5–3–3 (home: 1–1–1; road: 4–2–2)
#	Date	Visitor	Score	Home	OT	Decision	Attendance	Record	Pts	Recap
1	October 9	Boston Bruins	5–4	Colorado Avalanche		Tim Thomas	18,007	1–0–0	2
2	October 11	Boston Bruins	3–4	Minnesota Wild		Manny Fernandez	18,568	1–1–0	2
3	October 15	Boston Bruins	3–4	Montreal Canadiens	SO	Tim Thomas	21,273	1–1–1	3
4	October 18	Boston Bruins	4–2	Ottawa Senators		Manny Fernandez	20,182	2–1–1	5
5	October 20	Pittsburgh Penguins	2–1	Boston Bruins	SO	Tim Thomas	17,565	2–1–2	6
6	October 21	Boston Bruins	2–3	Buffalo Sabres	SO	Manny Fernandez	18,690	2–1–3	7
7	October 23	Toronto Maple Leafs	4–2	Boston Bruins		Tim Thomas	12,274	2–2–3	7
8	October 25	Atlanta Thrashers	4–5	Boston Bruins		Manny Fernandez	16,044	3–2–3	9
9	October 27	Boston Bruins	1–0	Edmonton Oilers	OT	Tim Thomas	16,839	4–2–3	11
10	October 28	Boston Bruins	1–0	Vancouver Canucks		Tim Thomas	18,630	5–2–3	13
11	October 30	Boston Bruins	2–3	Calgary Flames		Tim Thomas	19,289	5–3–3	13

November: 11–1–1 (home: 8–0–0; road: 3–1–1)
#	Date	Visitor	Score	Home	OT	Decision	Attendance	Record	Pts	Recap
12	November 1	Dallas Stars	1–5	Boston Bruins		Tim Thomas	14,576	6–3–3	15
13	November 6	Toronto Maple Leafs	2–5	Boston Bruins		Tim Thomas	15,391	7–3–3	17
14	November 8	Buffalo Sabres	1–3	Boston Bruins		Manny Fernandez	17,565	8–3–3	19
15	November 12	Boston Bruins	2–1	Chicago Blackhawks	SO	Tim Thomas	22,092	9–3–3	21
16	November 13	Montreal Canadiens	1–6	Boston Bruins		Manny Fernandez	16,816	10–3–3	23
17	November 15	Boston Bruins	2–3	New York Rangers	SO	Tim Thomas	18,200	10–3–4	24
18	November 17	Boston Bruins	3–2	Toronto Maple Leafs		Tim Thomas	19,410	11–3–4	26
19	November 19	Buffalo Sabres	4–7	Boston Bruins		Manny Fernandez	15,632	12–3–4	28
20	November 21	Florida Panthers	2–4	Boston Bruins		Tim Thomas	16,878	13–3–4	30
21	November 22	Boston Bruins	3–2	Montreal Canadiens	SO	Tim Thomas	21,273	14–3–4	32
22	November 26	Boston Bruins	2–3	Buffalo Sabres		Tim Thomas	18,326	14–4–4	32
23	November 28	New York Islanders	2–7	Boston Bruins		Manny Fernandez	17,565	15–4–4	34
24	November 29	Detroit Red Wings	1–4	Boston Bruins		Manny Fernandez	17,565	16–4–4	36

December: 12–1–0 (home: 4–0–0; road: 8–1–0)
#	Date	Visitor	Score	Home	OT	Decision	Attendance	Record	Pts	Recap
25	December 4	Boston Bruins	3–1	Tampa Bay Lightning		Tim Thomas	15,598	17–4–4	38
26	December 6	Boston Bruins	4–0	Florida Panthers		Manny Fernandez	16,213	18–4–4	40
27	December 8	Tampa Bay Lightning	3–5	Boston Bruins		Tim Thomas	16,973	19–4–4	42
28	December 10	Boston Bruins	1–3	Washington Capitals		Manny Fernandez	17,697	19–5–4	42
29	December 12	Boston Bruins	7–3	Atlanta Thrashers		Tim Thomas	15,818	20–5–4	44
30	December 13	Atlanta Thrashers	2–4	Boston Bruins		Manny Fernandez	17,565	21–5–4	46
31	December 18	Toronto Maple Leafs	5–8	Boston Bruins		Tim Thomas	17,565	22–5–4	48
32	December 20	Carolina Hurricanes	2–4	Boston Bruins		Manny Fernandez	17,565	23–5–4	50
33	December 21	Boston Bruins	6–3	St. Louis Blues		Manny Fernandez	19,150	24–5–4	52
34	December 23	Boston Bruins	2–0	New Jersey Devils		Tim Thomas	16,304	25–5–4	54
35	December 27	Boston Bruins	4–2	Carolina Hurricanes		Tim Thomas	16,705	26–5–4	56
36	December 28	Boston Bruins	2–1	Atlanta Thrashers		Manny Fernandez	16,835	27–5–4	58
37	December 30	Boston Bruins	5–2	Pittsburgh Penguins		Tim Thomas	17,132	28–5–4	60

January: 8–3–2 (home: 6–2–2; road: 2–1–0)
#	Date	Visitor	Score	Home	OT	Decision	Attendance	Record	Pts	Recap
38	January 1	Pittsburgh Penguins	2–4	Boston Bruins		Manny Fernandez	17,565	29–5–4	62
39	January 3	Buffalo Sabres	4–2	Boston Bruins		Tim Thomas	17,565	29–6–4	62
40	January 6	Minnesota Wild	1–0	Boston Bruins		Manny Fernandez	16,272	29–7–4	62
41	January 8	Ottawa Senators	4–6	Boston Bruins		Manny Fernandez	16,464	30–7–4	64
42	January 10	Carolina Hurricanes	1–5	Boston Bruins		Tim Thomas	17,565	31–7–4	66
43	January 13	Montreal Canadiens	1–3	Boston Bruins		Tim Thomas	17,565	32–7–4	68
44	January 15	Boston Bruins	2–1	New York Islanders		Tim Thomas	15,548	33–7–4	70
45	January 17	Boston Bruins	1–2	Washington Capitals		Tim Thomas	18,277	33–8–4	70
46	January 19	St. Louis Blues	5–4	Boston Bruins	SO	Tim Thomas	17,565	33–8–5	71
47	January 21	Boston Bruins	4–3	Toronto Maple Leafs	SO	Tim Thomas	19,258	34–8–5	73
48	January 27	Washington Capitals	2–3	Boston Bruins	OT	Tim Thomas	17,565	35–8–5	75
49	January 29	New Jersey Devils	4–3	Boston Bruins	OT	Tim Thomas	17,565	35–8–6	76
50	January 31	New York Rangers	0–1	Boston Bruins		Tuukka Rask	17,565	36–8–6	78

February: 6–4–3 (home: 2–1–2; road: 4–3–1)
#	Date	Visitor	Score	Home	OT	Decision	Attendance	Record	Pts	Recap
51	February 1	Boston Bruins	3–1	Montreal Canadiens		Tim Thomas	21,273	37–8–6	80
52	February 4	Boston Bruins	3–1	Philadelphia Flyers		Tim Thomas	19,748	38–8–6	82
53	February 5	Boston Bruins	4–3	Ottawa Senators	SO	Tim Thomas	17,297	39–8–6	84
54	February 7	Philadelphia Flyers	4–3	Boston Bruins	OT	Manny Fernandez	17,565	39–8–7	85
55	February 10	San Jose Sharks	5–2	Boston Bruins		Tim Thomas	17,565	39–9–7	85
56	February 13	Boston Bruins	0–1	New Jersey Devils		Tim Thomas	15,257	39–10–7	85
57	February 14	Boston Bruins	2–3	Nashville Predators	SO	Manny Fernandez	17,113	39–10–8	86
58	February 17	Boston Bruins	5–1	Carolina Hurricanes		Tim Thomas	18,680	40–10–8	88
59	February 21	Boston Bruins	0–2	Florida Panthers		Tim Thomas	19,343	40–11–8	88
60	February 22	Boston Bruins	3–4	Tampa Bay Lightning		Manny Fernandez	18,454	40–12–8	88
61	February 24	Florida Panthers	1–6	Boston Bruins		Tim Thomas	16,781	41–12–8	90
62	February 26	Anaheim Ducks	0–6	Boston Bruins		Tim Thomas	17,565	42–12–8	92
63	February 28	Washington Capitals	4–3	Boston Bruins	OT	Tim Thomas	17,565	42–12–9	93

March: 7–5–1 (home: 5–2–1; road: 2–3–0)
#	Date	Visitor	Score	Home	OT	Decision	Attendance	Record	Pts	Recap
64	March 3	Philadelphia Flyers	4–2	Boston Bruins		Manny Fernandez	17,020	42–13–9	93
65	March 5	Phoenix Coyotes	2–1	Boston Bruins		Tim Thomas	16,818	42–14–9	93
66	March 7	Chicago Blackhawks	3–5	Boston Bruins		Tim Thomas	17,565	43–14–9	95
67	March 8	Boston Bruins	3–4	New York Rangers		Manny Fernandez	18,200	43–15–9	95
68	March 10	Boston Bruins	0–2	Columbus Blue Jackets		Tim Thomas	16,675	43–16–9	95
69	March 12	Ottawa Senators	3–5	Boston Bruins		Tim Thomas	17,022	44–16–9	97
70	March 14	New York Islanders	1–2	Boston Bruins		Tim Thomas	17,565	45–16–9	99
71	March 15	Boston Bruins	4–6	Pittsburgh Penguins		Tim Thomas	17,132	45–17–9	99
72	March 19	Los Angeles Kings	3–2	Boston Bruins	OT	Tim Thomas	17,565	45–17–10	100
73	March 22	New Jersey Devils	1–4	Boston Bruins		Tim Thomas	17,565	46–17–10	102
74	March 28	Boston Bruins	7–5	Toronto Maple Leafs		Manny Fernandez	19,360	47–17–10	104
75	March 29	Boston Bruins	4–3	Philadelphia Flyers		Tim Thomas	19,715	48–17–10	106
76	March 31	Tampa Bay Lightning	1–3	Boston Bruins		Manny Fernandez	16,996	49–17–10	108

April: 4–2–0 (home: 3–0–0; road: 1–2–0)
#	Date	Visitor	Score	Home	OT	Decision	Attendance	Record	Pts	Recap
77	April 2	Ottawa Senators	1–2	Boston Bruins		Tim Thomas	17,565	50–17–10	110
78	April 4	New York Rangers	0–1	Boston Bruins		Tim Thomas	17,565	51–17–10	112
79	April 7	Boston Bruins	2–3	Ottawa Senators		Manny Fernandez	19,053	51–18–10	112
80	April 9	Montreal Canadiens	4–5	Boston Bruins	OT	Tim Thomas	17,565	52–18–10	114
81	April 11	Boston Bruins	1–6	Buffalo Sabres		Manny Fernandez	18,690	52–19–10	114
82	April 12	Boston Bruins	6–2	New York Islanders		Tim Thomas	14,311	53–19–10	116

Legend: Win (2 points) Loss (0 points) Overtime/Shootout Loss (1 point)

== Stanley Cup playoffs ==
The Bruins clinched a playoff spot for the second consecutive season, securing top seed in the Eastern Conference in the process and gaining home-ice advantage through the first three rounds.

=== Eastern Conference Quarterfinals ===
Boston played the eighth-seeded Montreal Canadiens in the first round of the playoffs. Boston had previously lost to Montreal in three consecutive playoff appearances and had not won a playoff series overall in the previous ten seasons.

The Bruins won the first game of the series 4–2, with goals from Phil Kessel, David Krejci and a powerplay winner from Zdeno Chara. In Game 2, Marc Savard had two goals and an assist, while Chuck Kobasew, Shane Hnidy – named as a replacement for the injured Matt Hunwick – and Michael Ryder also scored as the Bruins won 5–1. Milan Lucic was suspended for Game 3 after receiving a match penalty in the closing stages of game two for striking Montreal's Maxim Lapierre in the head with his stick. Boston then travelled to Montreal for Game 3, where they secured another 4–2 victory with goals by Kessel, Ryder, Kobasew and Shawn Thornton. They completed the sweep by winning Game 4, Michael Ryder posting two goals and an assist in the 4–1 victory as the Bruins advanced to the semi-finals for the first time since the 1998–99 season. This marked only the third time that Boston had swept Montreal in the playoffs in history, and the first time since 1992. The only time Boston swept Montreal in the playoffs and closed out the series in Montreal was in 1929, and that season, Boston went on to win the Stanley Cup.

=== Eastern Conference semifinals ===
Boston faced the Carolina Hurricanes, a franchise which carried the legacy of Boston's longtime rival the Hartford Whalers. Prior to the Bruins' first-round sweep of Montreal, their most recent playoff series victory had been against Carolina in April 1999.

The Bruins extended their 5-game winning streak with a 4–1 victory in Game 1, but Carolina stormed back on the strength of an aggressive forecheck and excellent goaltending from Cam Ward. Ward's shutout in Game 2, and Jussi Jokinen's game-winning goals in the next two matches, pushed the Bruins to the brink of elimination. Boston recovered for consecutive wins to push the series to a pivotal seventh game, but the Hurricanes prevailed in overtime of the final contest.

The series-winning goal was scored by Scott Walker, who earlier in the series had avoided punishment for an undefended punch to the face of former Hurricane Aaron Ward. Walker had been due for an automatic suspension, but that penalty was overturned by the NHL after a brief meeting in which he claimed to have thought Ward was prepared to fight. Ward disputed that account and publicly reprimanded the NHL for failing to follow through with a full investigation. In addition, Walker's wife received a diagnosis of cervical cancer midway through the series, lending an additional element of personal drama to his performance. After the series, Walker took public responsibility for striking Ward and expressed relief that his wife's cancer was treatable.

=== Playoff log ===
2009 Stanley Cup playoffs

Eastern Conference quarterfinals vs E8 Montreal Canadiens: 4–0 (home: 2–0; road: 2–0)
#	Date	Visitor	Score	Home	OT	Boston goals	Montreal goals	Decision	Attendance	Series	Recap
1	April 16	Montreal Canadiens	2–4	Boston Bruins		Kessel (2), Krejci, Chara	Higgins, Kovalev	Thomas	17,565	1–0
2	April 18	Montreal Canadiens	1–5	Boston Bruins		Savard (2), Kobasew, Hnidy, Ryder	Kovalev	Thomas	17,565	2–0
3	April 20	Boston Bruins	4–2	Montreal Canadiens		Kessel, Thornton, Ryder, Kobasew	Higgins, Weber	Thomas	21,273	3–0
4	April 22	Boston Bruins	4–1	Montreal Canadiens		Ryder (2), Krejci, Kessel	A. Kostitsyn	Thomas	21,273	4–0

Eastern Conference semifinals vs E6 Carolina Hurricanes: 3–4 (home: 2–2; road: 1–2)
#	Date	Visitor	Score	Home	OT	Boston goals	Carolina goals	Decision	Attendance	Series	Recap
1	May 1	Carolina Hurricanes	1–4	Boston Bruins		Ward, Savard (2), Ryder	Jokinen	Thomas	17,565	1–0
2	May 3	Carolina Hurricanes	3–0	Boston Bruins			Corvo, Cullen, E. Staal	Thomas	17,565	1–1
3	May 6	Boston Bruins	2–3	Carolina Hurricanes	2:48	Lucic, Recchi	E. Staal, Samsonov, Jokinen	Thomas	18,680	1–2
4	May 8	Boston Bruins	1–4	Carolina Hurricanes		Savard	E. Staal (2), Jokinen, Samsonov	Thomas	18,878	1–3
5	May 10	Carolina Hurricanes	0–4	Boston Bruins		Recchi, Kessel (2), Lucic		Thomas	17,565	2–3
6	May 12	Boston Bruins	4–2	Carolina Hurricanes		Recchi, Montador, Savard, Kobasew	Cullen, Samsanov	Thomas	18,680	3–3
7	May 14	Carolina Hurricanes	3–2	Boston Bruins	18:46	Bitz, Lucic	Brind'Amour, Samsonov, Walker	Thomas	17,565	3–4

- Scorer of game-winning goal in italics

== Player statistics ==
=== Skaters ===
Note: GP = Games played; G = Goals; A = Assists; Pts = Points; +/- = Plus–minus; PIM = Penalty minutes

Regular season

Playoffs

Player	GP	G	A	Pts	+/-	PIM	GP	G	A	Pts	+/-	PIM
Marc Savard	82	25	63	88	25	70	11	6	7	13	2	4
David Krejci	82	22	51	73	37	26	11	2	6	8	6	2
Phil Kessel	70	36	24	60	23	16	11	6	5	11	7	4
Michael Ryder	74	27	26	53	28	26	11	5	8	13	4	8
Dennis Wideman	79	13	37	50	32	34	11	0	7	7	3	4
Zdeno Chara	80	19	31	50	23	95	11	1	3	4	1	12
Blake Wheeler	81	21	24	45	36	46	8	0	0	0	0	0
Chuck Kobasew	68	21	21	42	5	56	11	3	3	6	3	14
Milan Lucic	72	17	25	42	17	136	10	3	6	9	12	43
Patrice Bergeron	64	8	31	39	2	16	11	0	5	5	3	11
P. J. Axelsson	75	6	24	30	-1	16	11	0	1	1	-6	2
Matt Hunwick	53	6	21	27	15	31	1	0	0	0	0	0
Stephane Yelle	77	7	11	18	6	32	11	0	1	1	-4	2
Mark Stuart	82	5	12	17	20	76	11	0	1	1	5	7
Mark Recchi^{†}	18	10	6	16	-3	2	11	3	3	6	0	2
Andrew Ference	47	1	15	16	7	40	3	0	0	0	1	4
Marco Sturm	19	7	6	13	9	8						
Shane Hnidy	65	3	9	12	6	45	7	1	0	1	-1	0
Shawn Thornton	79	6	5	11	-2	123	10	1	0	1	0	6
Aaron Ward	65	3	7	10	16	44	11	1	0	1	4	2
Byron Bitz	35	4	3	7	0	18	5	1	1	2	0	2
Vladimir Sobotka	25	1	4	5	-10	10						
Martin St. Pierre	14	2	2	4	-1	4						
Petteri Nokelainen^{‡}	33	0	3	3	-1	10						
Steve Montador^{†}	13	0	1	1	3	18	11	1	2	3	5	18
Matt Lashoff^{‡}	16	0	1	1	1	10						
Martins Karsums^{‡}	6	0	1	1	-3	0						
Tim Thomas ^{(G)}	54	0	1	1	—	6	11	0	1	1	—	0
Manny Fernandez ^{(G)}	28	0	0	0	—	2						
Mikko Lehtonen	1	0	0	0	0	0						
Johnny Boychuk	1	0	0	0	0	0						
Totals	—	270	465	735	60	1016	—	34	60	94	9	147

- ^{†}Denotes player spent time with another team before joining Bruins. Stats reflect time with the Bruins only.
- ^{‡}Denotes player was traded mid-season.
- ^{(G)}Denotes goaltender.

=== Goaltenders ===
Note: GPI = Games Played In; MIN = Minutes played; GAA = Goals against average; W = Wins; L = Losses; OT = Overtime/shootout losses; SO = Shutouts; SA = Shots Against; GA = Goals against; SV% = Save percentage

Regular season

Playoffs

Player	GPI	MIN	GAA	W	L	OT	SO	SA	GA	SV%	GPI	MIN	GAA	W	L	OT	SO	SA	GA	SV%
Tim Thomas	54	3259	2.10	36	11	7	5	1694	114	.933	11	680	1.85	7	4	0	1	323	21	.935
Manny Fernandez	28	1644	2.59	16	8	3	1	791	71	.910										
Tuukka Rask	1	60	0.00	1	0	0	1	35	0	1.000										
Combined	—	—	2.26	53	19	10	7	2520	185	.927	—	—	1.85	7	4	0	1	323	21	.935

== Awards and records ==
=== Milestones ===
Regular season milestones
Player	Milestone	Reached
Blake Wheeler	1st NHL game 1st NHL goal 1st NHL point	October 9, 2008
Michael Ryder	100th NHL goal	October 9, 2008
Aaron Ward	700th NHL game	October 15, 2008
Manny Fernandez	300th NHL appearance	October 21, 2008
Milan Lucic	1st NHL hat trick	October 25, 2008
Blake Wheeler	1st NHL assist	November 1, 2008
Blake Wheeler	1st NHL hat trick	November 6, 2008
Zdeno Chara	700th NHL game	November 6, 2008
Matt Hunwick	1st NHL goal	November 17, 2008
Marc Savard	600th NHL point	November 19, 2008
Patrice Bergeron	200th NHL point	November 19, 2008
Dennis Wideman	100th NHL point	December 8, 2008
Martins Karsums	1st NHL game	December 13, 2008
Phil Kessel	100th NHL point	December 18, 2008
David Krejci	1st NHL hat trick	December 18, 2008
Marc Savard	700th NHL game	January 8, 2009
P. J. Axelsson	100th NHL goal	January 8, 2009
Byron Bitz	1st NHL game 1st NHL assist	January 10, 2009
Martins Karsums	1st NHL assist	January 10, 2009
Zdeno Chara	200th NHL assist	January 10, 2009
Tuukka Rask	1st NHL shutout	January 31, 2009
Phil Kessel	200th NHL game	February 7, 2009
Byron Bitz	1st NHL goal	February 7, 2009
Andrew Ference	500th NHL game	February 21, 2009
Tim Thomas	100th NHL win	February 26, 2009
Zdeno Chara	100th NHL goal	February 28, 2009
Patrice Bergeron	300th NHL game	April 2, 2009
Mikko Lehtonen	1st NHL game	April 11, 2009

The Bruins' 5–1 win against the Carolina Hurricanes, on February 17, 2009, was the 200th NHL winning game coached, for current Bruins coach Claude Julien.
The Bruins' 5–4 overtime win against the Montreal Canadiens, on April 9, 2009, was the 400th NHL game coached, for current Bruins coach Claude Julien.

Playoff milestones
Player	Milestone	Reached
Mark Recchi	150th playoff game 50th playoff goal	May 12, 2009
Byron Bitz	1st playoff goal	May 14, 2009

=== Awards ===
Player	Award	Notes
Claude Julien	Jack Adams Award	Awarded to the coach adjudged to have contributed the most to his team's success.
Zdeno Chara	James Norris Memorial Trophy	Awarded to the defenseman who demonstrates the greatest all-round ability in the position.
Tim Thomas	Vezina Trophy	Awarded to the goaltender who is adjudged to be the best at this position.
Tim Thomas; Manny Fernandez	William M. Jennings Trophy	Awarded to the goalkeeper(s) playing for the team that conceded the fewest goals.
Patrice Bergeron	Bill Masterton Memorial Trophy nominee	Nominated by the Writers' Association for league-wide recognition.
Zdeno Chara; Tim Thomas	NHL First All-Star Team	Voted by representatives of the Professional Hockey Writers' Association.
Milan Lucic	NHL.com Fans' Choice Award	Hit of the Season - as voted on by users at NHL.com.

On April 4, prior to the game against the New York Rangers, the team announced its award winners for the season.

Player	Award	Notes
David Krejci	NESN Seventh Player Award	Awarded to the player who exceeded the expectations of Bruins fans during the season.
Milan Lucic	Eddie Shore Award	Awarded to the player who exhibits exceptional hustle and determination.
Marc Savard	Elizabeth C. Dufresne Trophy	Awarded by the Boston Chapter of the PHWA, for outstanding performance during home games.
Aaron Ward	John P. Bucyk Award	Awarded to the Bruin with the greatest off-ice charitable contributions.
Marc Savard; Zdeno Chara; Tim Thomas	Three Star Awards	Awarded to the top performers at home over the course of the season.

== Transactions ==
Trades

May 27, 2008	To Columbus Blue Jackets Jonathan Sigalet	To Boston Bruins Matt Marquardt
June 21, 2008	To Columbus Blue Jackets 4th-round pick in 2008; 5th-round pick in 2008	To Boston Bruins 4th-round pick in 2008
June 24, 2008	To Colorado Avalanche Matt Hendricks	To Boston Bruins Johnny Boychuk
July 24, 2008	To Chicago Blackhawks Pascal Pelletier	To Boston Bruins Martin St. Pierre
October 13, 2008	To Philadelphia Flyers Andrew Alberts	To Boston Bruins Ned Lukacevic; 4th-round pick in 2009
March 4, 2009	To Anaheim Ducks Petteri Nokelainen	To Boston Bruins Steve Montador
March 4, 2009	To Tampa Bay Lightning Matt Lashoff; Martins Karsums	To Boston Bruins Mark Recchi; 2nd-round pick in 2010

Free agents

Player	Former team
Michael Ryder	Montreal Canadiens
Blake Wheeler	Phoenix Coyotes
Stephane Yelle	Calgary Flames

Claimed from waivers

Player	Former team	Date claimed off waivers

== Draft picks ==
Boston's picks at the 2008 NHL entry draft in Ottawa, Ontario.

Round	#	Player	Position	Nationality	College/junior/club team (league)
1	16	Joe Colborne	Center	Canada	Camrose Kodiaks (AJHL)
2	47	Maxime Sauve	Center	France	Val-d'Or Foreurs (QMJHL)
3	77	Michael Hutchinson	Goaltender	Canada	Barrie Colts (OHL)
4	97	Jamie Arniel	Center	Canada	Sarnia Sting (OHL)
6	173	Nicholas Tremblay	Center	Canada	Smiths Falls Bears (CJHL)
7	197	Mark Goggin	Center	United States	Choate-Rosemary (HIGH-CT)

== Affiliates ==
American Hockey League – Providence Bruins (standings)

Johnny Boychuk was selected as a starter for Team Canada in the 2009 AHL All Star Classic. Martins Karsums was selected as a reserve for the PlanetUSA team. Both players were under two-way NHL contracts and played games with Boston during the season. In the game, Karsums, named as a late starter, scored two goals and three assists.
