= Marc Savard =

Canadian ice hockey player (born 1977)

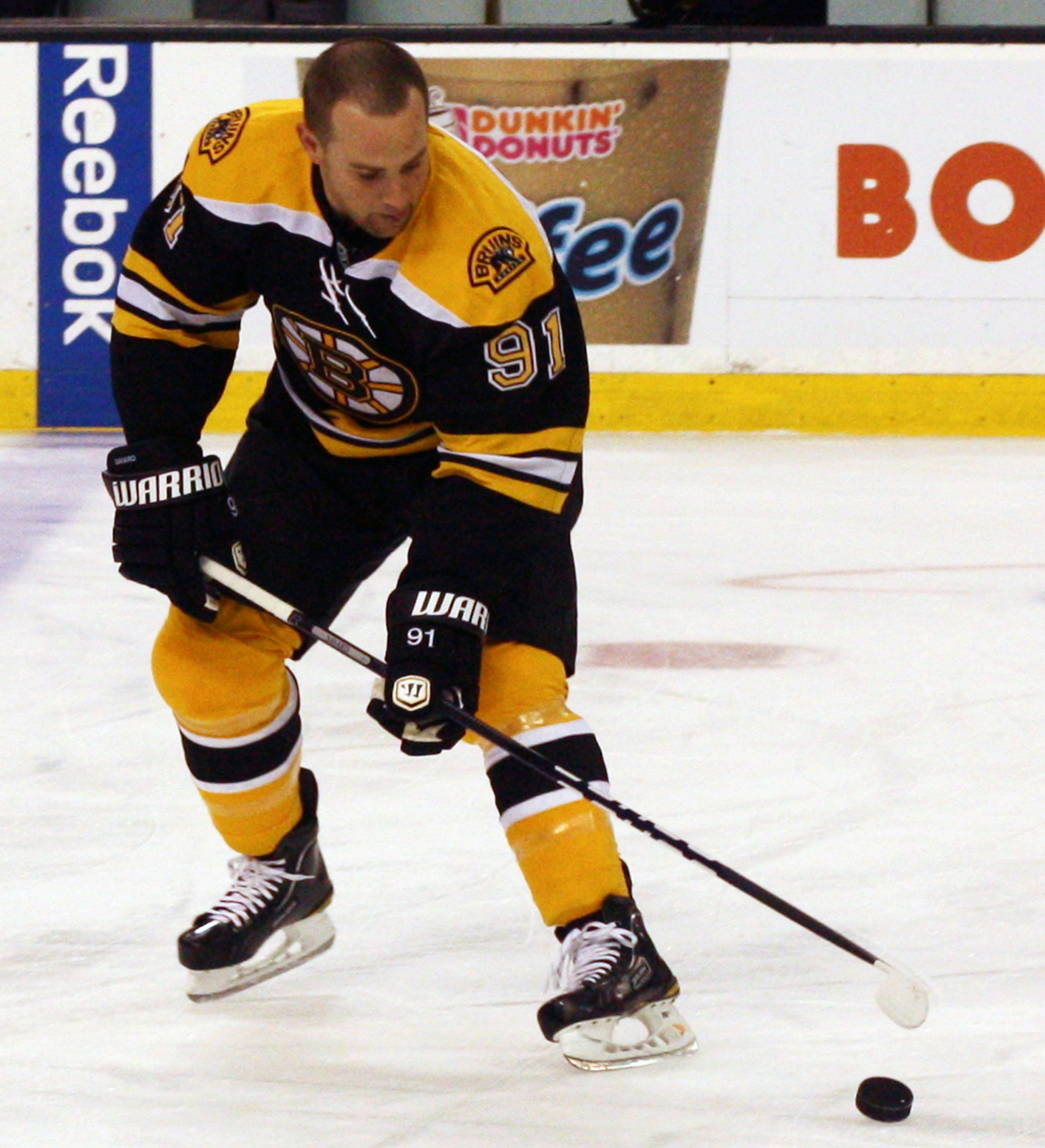
- Savard with the Boston Bruins in May 2010
- Born: July 17, 1977 (age 49) Ottawa, Ontario, Canada
- Height: 5 ft 10 in (178 cm)
- Weight: 209 lb (95 kg; 14 st 13 lb)
- Position: Centre
- Shot: Left
- Played for: New York Rangers; Calgary Flames; Atlanta Thrashers; SC Bern; Boston Bruins
- NHL draft: 91st overall, 1995; New York Rangers
- Playing career: 1997–2011

Marc Savard (born July 17, 1977) is a Canadian former professional ice hockey centre, former assistant coach for the Toronto Maple Leafs, Calgary Flames, and St. Louis Blues of the National Hockey League (NHL), and former head coach of the Windsor Spitfires in the Ontario Hockey League. He was drafted by the New York Rangers with the 91st overall in the 1995 NHL entry draft. During his NHL career, Savard played for the Rangers, Calgary Flames, Atlanta Thrashers, and Boston Bruins. He was an assistant coach for the St. Louis Blues during the 2019–20 season.

Savard's career ended late in the 2010–11 season due to post-concussion syndrome. He did not formally announce his retirement until the conclusion of his contract after the 2016–17 season.

== Playing career ==
=== Early career (1993–1999) ===
Savard played major junior hockey in the Ontario Hockey League (OHL) with the Oshawa Generals, beginning in 1993–94. After his second season with the Generals, in which he scored a league-leading 139 points, he was selected 91st overall in the 1995 NHL entry draft by the New York Rangers. He continued to play in the OHL for two more seasons and earned his second Eddie Powers Memorial Trophy as the OHL's leading scorer with 130 points in 1996–97. Savard then added 27 points in 15 playoff games, guiding the Generals to the 1997 J. Ross Robertson Cup and an appearance in the 1997 Memorial Cup.

In 1997–98, Savard was assigned by the Rangers to their American Hockey League (AHL) affiliate, the Hartford Wolfpack. He scored 74 points with Hartford while being called up to play in 28 games for the Rangers in his rookie professional campaign. The following season, he earned an expanded role with the Rangers and scored 45 points in 70 games.

=== Calgary Flames (1999–2002) ===
On June 26, 1999, shortly after the completion of Savard's first full season with the Rangers, he was traded to the Calgary Flames, along with the Rangers' first-round choice in 1999 (Oleg Saprykin), in exchange for the playing rights to Jan Hlaváč, Calgary's first-round pick (Jamie Lundmark) and third-round pick (later traded back to Calgary; Calgary selected Craig Anderson) in the 1999 Draft. Savard continued to improve with the Flames and in 2000–01, he finished second in team scoring to Jarome Iginla with 65 points.

=== Atlanta Thrashers (2002–2006) ===
Shortly after beginning his fourth season with the Flames, Savard was acquired by the Atlanta Thrashers from Calgary in exchange for Ruslan Zainullin on November 15, 2002. Playing with superstar wingers Dany Heatley and Ilya Kovalchuk, Savard became a point-per-game player and recorded 52 points in 45 games during an injury shortened 2003–04 season.

Due to the 2004–05 NHL lockout, Savard played in the Swiss leagues with HC Thurgau of Nationalliga B and briefly with SC Bern of Nationalliga A. When NHL play resumed the following season, he emerged as a top talent in the NHL with a career-high 97 points, good for ninth overall in the league.

=== Boston Bruins (2006–2011) ===
At the end of his breakthrough season, Savard became an unrestricted free agent and signed with the Boston Bruins to a four-year, $20 million contract on July 1, 2006. He picked up where he left off in Atlanta and led the Bruins in scoring in his first season with the team, tallying 96 points. His 74 assists were good for third in the league for the second consecutive season, behind Joe Thornton (92) and Sidney Crosby (84).

In his second season with the Bruins, Savard was named to his first NHL All-Star Game in 2008, replacing an injured Dany Heatley. He scored the game-winning goal with 21 seconds remaining in the third period. Although Savard's offensive production was cut down to 78 points because of injury in the 2007–08 season, he made his playoff debut after 11 seasons in the NHL. As the eighth-seeded Bruins faced the top-seeded Montreal Canadiens in the opening round, Savard scored his first NHL playoff goal in the first overtime of game three. He scored six points in the series, but the Bruins were eliminated by the Canadiens in seven games.

Savard was named as a reserve to his second All-Star Game in Montreal the following season, in 2008–09, and helped lead the Bruins to a first-place finish in the Eastern Conference. Savard led the Bruins in scoring with 88 points in 82 games before adding 13 points in 11 playoff games. Playing the Canadiens in the first round for the second consecutive year, Savard and the Bruins swept the series in four games. He advanced to the second round for the first time in his career, where the Bruins were eliminated in seven games by the Carolina Hurricanes.

Seven games into the 2009–10 season, Savard sustained a broken foot while inadvertently blocking a shot. After he was taken to Massachusetts General Hospital, tests revealed he had been playing with an injured foot since taking a previous shot in the foot during training camp. Savard was placed on the long-term injured reserve on October 21, 2009. Shortly after returning to the line-up, the Bruins signed Savard to a seven-year extension on December 1, worth $28.05 million (approximately $4.2 million per season). The contract is spread out, with approximately $14 million the first two years and $14 million for the remaining five. On January 7, 2010, only 28 seconds into his first shift on the ice, Marc Savard suffered a right knee injury after colliding with Jonathan Toews from the Chicago Blackhawks. After getting an MRI, he was placed on injured reserve with a minor MCL tear in his right knee. No surgery was required. On March 7, Savard suffered a Grade 2 concussion in the third period of the Bruins' game against the Pittsburgh Penguins after getting a shoulder to the head from Matt Cooke. The on-ice officials did not penalize Cooke for the hit, and on March 10, Colin Campbell declared that the NHL would not suspend or fine Cooke. The hit and its aftermath were part of the key evidence that caused NHL to institute a new rule that more heavily penalized blindside hits. Savard was not taken to a hospital following the incident but stayed behind at a Pittsburgh hotel for the night before returning to Boston the following day. Savard recovered enough to be cleared to play for the 2010 playoff series against the Philadelphia Flyers after their victory against the Buffalo Sabres. He scored the winning goal in overtime in the Bruins' win in game one of the series. The Bruins would go on to eventually lose the series in seven games, after initially taking a 3–0 series lead.

Savard was diagnosed with post-concussion syndrome during the subsequent off-season, missing the first 23 games of the 2010–11 season. Despite eventually returning, Savard's performance was quite muted, with just 10 points in 25 games after scoring at a near point-per-game basis for most of his career with the Bruins. On January 23, 2011, Savard suffered a second concussion on a hit by former Bruin Matt Hunwick in a game against the Colorado Avalanche. On February 8, the Bruins opted to shut Savard down for the season after he received his second concussion in ten months. The Bruins went on to win the Stanley Cup, defeating the Presidents' Trophy-winning Vancouver Canucks in the 2011 Stanley Cup Final in seven games. Due to recurring symptoms of post-concussion syndrome, Savard was not able to travel to Vancouver to take part in the on-ice victory celebration after game seven with his teammates, but he was able to join them back in Boston for the official victory parade. Despite not playing the required number of games for his name to be automatically included in the Stanley Cup engraving, the Bruins petitioned the league to include Savard's name on the Cup. Savard enjoyed his personal day with the Stanley Cup on August 1, in his hometown of Peterborough, Ontario; at that time, he announced he was still suffering the effects of his injury. On August 31, 2011, it was announced Savard had been shut down for the 2011–12 season by Bruins general manager Peter Chiarelli. Chiarelli was quoted as saying, "Based on what I see, what I hear, what I read, and what I'm told, it's very unlikely Marc will play again." On September 12, 2011, Chiarelli announced Savard's name would be included on the Stanley Cup as he had missed games only due to injury.

=== Post-playing career ===
On July 1, 2015, Savard's contract with the Bruins was included in a trade of Reilly Smith to the Florida Panthers in exchange for Jimmy Hayes due to salary cap circumstances.

On June 10, 2016, Savard's contract was traded to the New Jersey Devils, along with a second-round pick in the 2018 NHL entry draft, in exchange for Paul Thompson and Graham Black. Savard formally announced his retirement on January 22, 2018, seven years after he played his last NHL game.

== Coaching career ==
Savard was hired as an assistant coach for the St. Louis Blues on July 24, 2019. On September 4, 2020, the Blues announced Savard had stepped away from the team to spend more time with his family. Less than a year later, on August 24, 2021, Savard was named the head coach of the Windsor Spitfires in the Ontario Hockey League, where he coached for two seasons, from 2021 to 2023, and amassed an 88-35-13 record.

Following the firing of Calgary Flames head coach Darryl Sutter at the conclusion of the 2022-23 NHL season, Flames assistant coach Ryan Huska was promoted to head coach, and Savard was hired to fill the assistant coaching vacancy.

On June 23, 2024, Savard was hired by the Toronto Maple Leafs as an assistant coach. On December 22, 2025, Savard was fired by the Toronto Maple Leafs. At the time of his firing, the Maple Leafs had the worst power play in the league, scoring on only 13.3 percent of opportunities.

== Awards ==
- Won the Eddie Powers Memorial Trophy (OHL top scorer) in 1995 and 1997.
- Won the CHL Top Scorer Award in 1995.
- Named the NHL Offensive Player of the Week for October 5–8, 2005.
- Elizabeth C. Dufresne Trophy winner in 2007 and 2009.
- Bruins Three Stars Awards — 2007, 2008 and 2009.
- Played in the NHL All-Star Game in 2008 and 2009.
- Won the Stanley Cup in 2011.
- Named One of the Top 100 Best Bruins Players of all Time.

== Records ==
- Oshawa Generals franchise all-time points leader – 413 points in 238 games (1993–94 to 1996–97)
- Atlanta Thrashers franchise record for most assists in consecutive games – 7 in 2 games (November 11–12, 2005)

== Career statistics ==
			Regular season					Playoffs
Season	Team	League	GP	G	A	Pts	PIM	GP	G	A	Pts	PIM
1992–93	Metcalfe Jets	EOJHL	36	44	55	99	38	—	—	—	—	—
1993–94	Oshawa Generals	OHL	61	18	39	57	24	5	4	3	7	8
1994–95	Oshawa Generals	OHL	66	43	96	139	78	7	5	6	11	8
1995–96	Oshawa Generals	OHL	47	28	59	87	77	5	4	5	9	6
1996–97	Oshawa Generals	OHL	64	43	87	130	94	18	13	24	37	20
1997–98	Hartford Wolf Pack	AHL	58	21	53	74	66	15	8	19	27	24
1997–98	New York Rangers	NHL	28	1	5	6	4	—	—	—	—	—
1998–99	New York Rangers	NHL	70	9	36	45	38	—	—	—	—	—
1998–99	Hartford Wolfpack	AHL	9	3	10	13	16	7	1	12	13	16
1999–2000	Calgary Flames	NHL	78	22	31	53	56	—	—	—	—	—
2000–01	Calgary Flames	NHL	77	23	42	65	46	—	—	—	—	—
2001–02	Calgary Flames	NHL	56	14	19	33	48	—	—	—	—	—
2002–03	Calgary Flames	NHL	10	1	2	3	8	—	—	—	—	—
2002–03	Atlanta Thrashers	NHL	57	16	31	47	77	—	—	—	—	—
2003–04	Atlanta Thrashers	NHL	45	19	33	52	85	—	—	—	—	—
2004–05	SC Bern	NLA	5	1	2	3	0	—	—	—	—	—
2004–05	HC Thurgau	NLB	13	9	19	28	10	—	—	—	—	—
2005–06	Atlanta Thrashers	NHL	82	28	69	97	100	—	—	—	—	—
2006–07	Boston Bruins	NHL	82	22	74	96	96	—	—	—	—	—
2007–08	Boston Bruins	NHL	74	15	63	78	66	7	1	5	6	6
2008–09	Boston Bruins	NHL	82	25	63	88	70	11	6	7	13	4
2009–10	Boston Bruins	NHL	41	10	23	33	14	7	1	2	3	12
2010–11	Boston Bruins	NHL	25	2	8	10	29	—	—	—	—	—
NHL totals			807	207	499	706	737	25	8	14	22	22

== Golf career ==
During the 2007 off-season, Savard qualified for the 2007 Royal Canadian Golf Association's Canadian Men's Mid-Amateur Golf Championship.
