= Andrej Meszároš =

Slovak ice hockey player (born 1985)

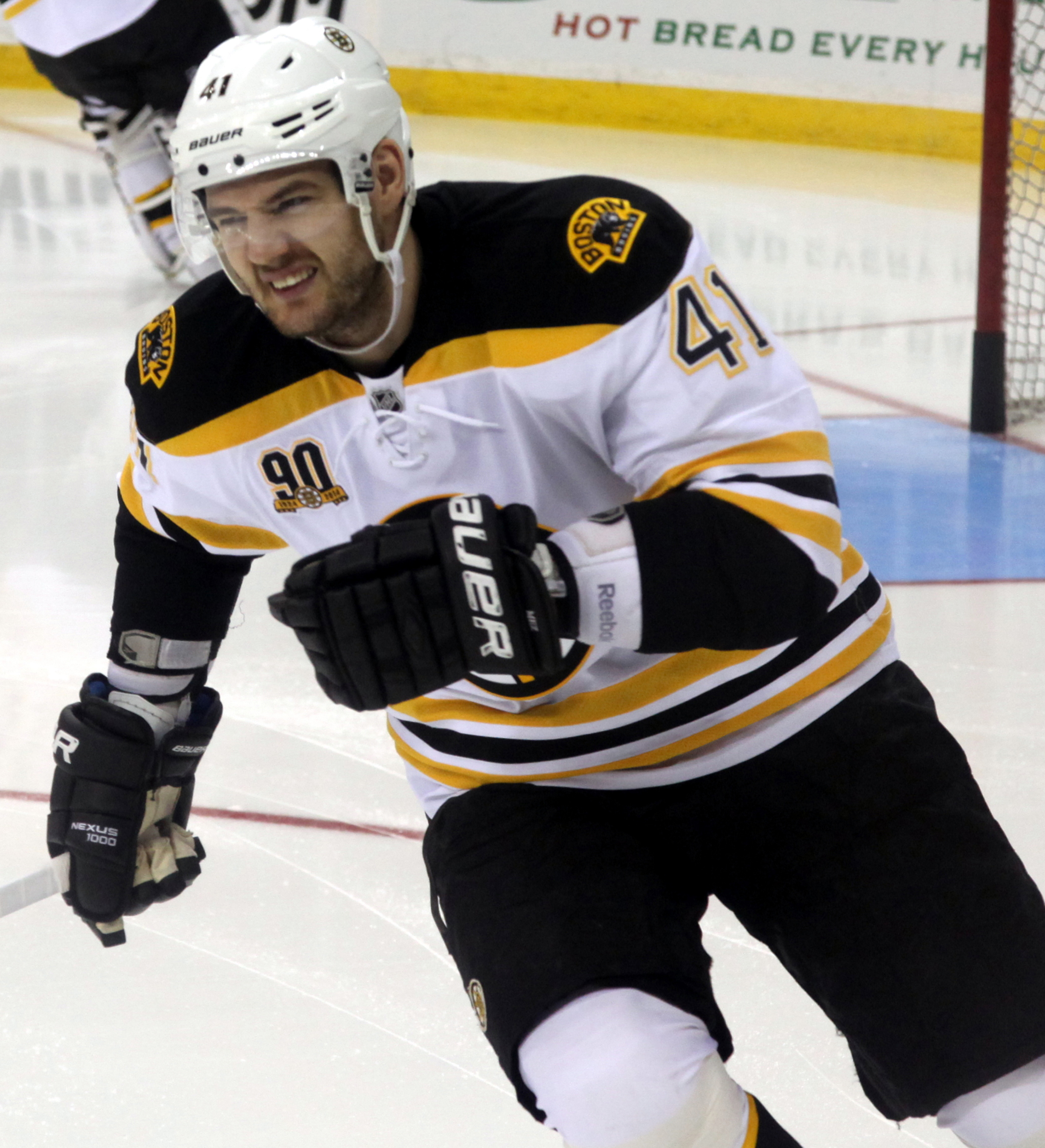
- Meszároš with the Boston Bruins in 2014
- Born: 13 October 1985 (age 41) Považská Bystrica, Czechoslovakia
- Height: 6 ft 2 in (188 cm)
- Weight: 218 lb (99 kg; 15 st 8 lb)
- Position: Defence
- Shot: Left
- Played for: HK Dukla Trenčín; Ottawa Senators; Tampa Bay Lightning; Philadelphia Flyers; Boston Bruins; Buffalo Sabres; Sibir Novosibirsk; Slovan Bratislava
- National team: Slovakia
- NHL draft: 23rd overall, 2004; Ottawa Senators
- Playing career: 2002–2022

Andrej Meszároš (Slovak pronunciation: [ˈandrej ˈmesaːrɔʂ]; born 13 October 1985) is a Slovak former professional ice hockey player.

He previously played in the NHL with the Buffalo Sabres, Boston Bruins, Philadelphia Flyers, Tampa Bay Lightning and Ottawa Senators, the latter of which drafted him in the first round of the 2004 NHL entry draft, 23rd overall.

== Playing career ==
As a youth, Meszároš played in the 1999 Quebec International Pee-Wee Hockey Tournament with a team from Bratislava. He later played for Dukla Trenčín in the Slovak Extraliga as a 17-year-old in the 2002–03 season. After two seasons with Trenčín, he was drafted 23rd overall in the 2004 NHL entry draft by the Ottawa Senators.

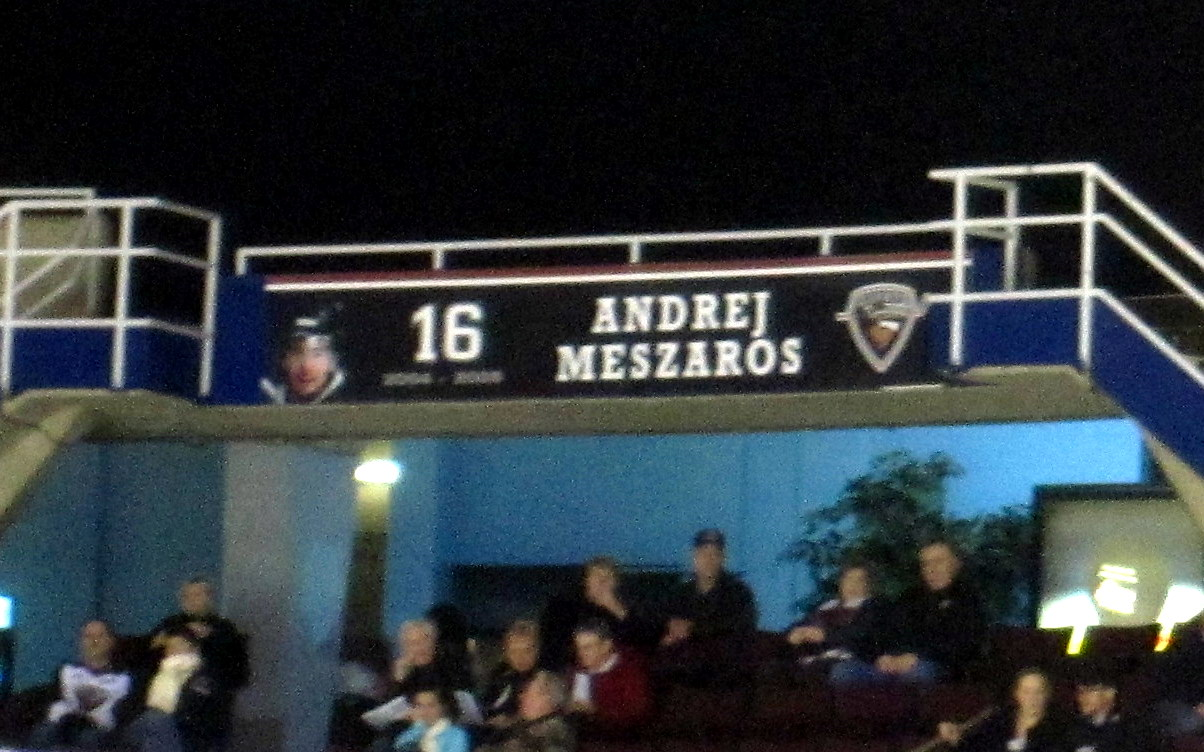
Meszaros' banner at the Pacific Coliseum, as part of the Vancouver Giants' Ring of Honour

The following season, he went overseas to North America to play junior ice hockey in the Western Hockey League (WHL) with the Vancouver Giants. Meszároš recorded 41 points in 59 games with Vancouver — fifth in WHL rookie scoring — and was named to the Western Conference's Second All-Star Team. He was also named the Giants' Rookie of the Year and Top Defenceman. Nearly six years later, he was inducted into the Giants' Ring of Honour, a series of banners inside the Pacific Coliseum commemorating the team's best alumni.

In the 2005–06 season, Meszároš made the jump to the NHL with the Senators. Meszároš registered his first NHL point, an assist, on 10 October 2005, in a 6–5 shootout win over the Toronto Maple Leafs. Two months later, he scored his first NHL goal on 9 December — a game-tying goal in the third period of a shootout loss against the Vancouver Canucks. He finished his rookie season with 10 goals and 39 points, and was named to the NHL All-Rookie Team with the Calgary Flames' Dion Phaneuf. Playing on a defensive pairing with Zdeno Chára, Meszároš' plus-minus rating of +39 was tied for third in the league overall and first among rookies.

The following year, Meszároš registered seven goals and 35 points and added seven points in the playoffs as the Senators made their first franchise appearance in the Stanley Cup Finals against the Anaheim Ducks. The Senators, however, were defeated by Anaheim in five games. Meszároš finished second on the team in playoff plus-minus, behind Wade Redden, at +5. His sophomore season also included an appearance in the 2007 YoungStars Game with teammate Patrick Eaves, in which he scored two goals in a 9–8 victory over the Western Conference.

Although Meszároš produced at a similar pace in 2007–08, the Senators finished a disappointing seventh in the Eastern Conference and were swept by the Pittsburgh Penguins in the first round of the playoffs. Meszároš became a restricted free agent in the off-season and, unable to come to terms, the Senators traded him to the Tampa Bay Lightning on 29 August 2008 in exchange for Filip Kuba, Alexandre Picard and the San Jose Sharks' first-round draft pick (previously acquired) in 2009. The following day, he agreed to a six-year, $24 million contract.

On 1 July 2010, the first day of the NHL's free agency period, Meszároš was traded to the Philadelphia Flyers in exchange for a second round pick in 2012.

In his first season with the Flyers, Meszároš won the Barry Ashbee Trophy, awarded to the best defenceman on the team.

On 5 March 2014, the Flyers traded Meszároš to the Boston Bruins in exchange for a conditional 2014 third-round draft pick. He scored a power play goal in his debut as a Bruin on 9 March en route to a 5–2 road win against the Florida Panthers.

On 1 July 2014, Meszároš signed a one-year, $4 million contract with the Buffalo Sabres. In the 2014–15 season, expected to contribute on the rebuilding Sabres blueline, Meszároš struggled to play consistently to match his contract, appearing in 60 games with only 14 points.

As a free agent from the Sabres in the off-season, Meszároš went un-signed and later accepted a professional try-out contract to attend the Colorado Avalanche training camp on 15 September 2015. After suffering an early injury during training camp, he was unable to make an impression and was later released on 30 September. On 30 October 2015, Meszároš signed with Sibir Novosibirsk of the Kontinental Hockey League (KHL).

On 11 February 2023, Meszároš announced his retirement from professional hockey on his Instagram.

== International play ==
Meszároš debuted internationally for Slovakia in the 2003 World U18 Championships as team captain. After a strong round robin, finishing second in their group behind the United States, Slovakia upset the Czech Republic and Russia before being defeated by Canada 3–0 in the gold medal game, earning silver. Meszároš finished with four points in seven games, third in tournament scoring among defencemen.

In 2004, Meszároš competed in World Junior Championships in Finland. After losing their quarter-final match against the Czech Republic, Slovakia was then defeated 3–2 by Russia in the fifth place game. Meszároš scored a goal and an assist in six games. Later that year, he made his senior international debut with Slovakia in the 2004 World Championships. Meszároš recorded one assist in seven games as Slovakia was defeated 1–0 by the United States in the bronze medal game. At 18-years-of-age, he was the youngest player to compete for Slovakia in both 2004 tournaments.

Meszároš made his second World Junior appearance in 2005, returning as team captain. Despite three goals and one assist from Meszároš, Slovakia failed to qualify for the medal rounds.

During his rookie NHL season in 2005–06, Meszároš was chosen to Slovakia's 2006 Olympic hockey team in Turin and registered two assists in six games. As a 20-year-old, he was the second-youngest player in the tournament, behind only Russia's Evgeni Malkin. After the Ottawa Senators were eliminated in the second round of the NHL playoffs, Meszároš joined Slovakia for one game in the 2006 World Championships. Slovakia ultimately finished eighth in the tournament.

== Career statistics ==
=== Regular season and playoffs ===
			Regular season					Playoffs
Season	Team	League	GP	G	A	Pts	PIM	GP	G	A	Pts	PIM
2001–02	Dukla Trenčín	SVK U20	—	—	—	—	—	—	—	—	—	—
2002–03	Dukla Trenčín	SVK U20	33	6	10	16	12	—	—	—	—	—
2002–03	Dukla Trenčín	Slovak	23	0	1	1	4	—	—	—	—	—
2003–04	Dukla Trenčín	SVK U20	5	2	2	4	0	—	—	—	—	—
2003–04	Dukla Trenčín	Slovak	44	3	3	6	8	14	3	1	4	2
2004–05	Vancouver Giants	WHL	59	11	30	41	94	6	1	3	4	14
2005–06	Ottawa Senators	NHL	82	10	29	39	61	10	1	0	1	18
2006–07	Ottawa Senators	NHL	82	7	28	35	102	20	1	6	7	12
2007–08	Ottawa Senators	NHL	82	9	27	36	50	4	0	1	1	6
2008–09	Tampa Bay Lightning	NHL	52	2	14	16	36	—	—	—	—	—
2009–10	Tampa Bay Lightning	NHL	81	6	11	17	50	—	—	—	—	—
2010–11	Philadelphia Flyers	NHL	81	8	24	32	42	11	2	4	6	8
2011–12	Philadelphia Flyers	NHL	62	7	18	25	38	1	0	0	0	0
2012–13	Philadelphia Flyers	NHL	11	0	2	2	2	—	—	—	—	—
2013–14	Philadelphia Flyers	NHL	38	5	12	17	34	—	—	—	—	—
2013–14	Boston Bruins	NHL	14	2	3	5	6	4	0	2	2	2
2014–15	Buffalo Sabres	NHL	60	7	7	14	36	—	—	—	—	—
2015–16	Sibir Novosibirsk	KHL	28	6	3	9	36	9	1	3	4	10
2016–17	Slovan Bratislava	KHL	35	4	9	13	63	—	—	—	—	—
2017–18	Slovan Bratislava	KHL	51	6	11	17	46	—	—	—	—	—
2018–19	Slovan Bratislava	KHL	39	2	5	7	32	—	—	—	—	—
2019–20	Slovan Bratislava	Slovak	48	4	27	31	50	—	—	—	—	—
2020–21	Slovan Bratislava	Slovak	27	3	6	9	36	10	2	4	6	10
2021–22	Dukla Trenčín	Slovak	2	1	0	1	2	—	—	—	—	—
NHL totals			645	63	175	238	457	50	4	13	17	46
KHL totals			153	18	28	46	177	9	1	3	4	10

=== International ===
Year	Team	Event	GP	G	A	Pts	PIM
2002	Slovakia	WJC18	8	0	1	1	8
2003	Slovakia	WJC18	7	2	2	4	6
2004	Slovakia	WJC	6	1	1	2	12
2004	Slovakia	WC	7	0	1	1	2
2005	Slovakia	WJC	6	3	1	4	4
2006	Slovakia	OLY	6	0	2	2	4
2006	Slovakia	WC	1	0	0	0	0
2010	Slovakia	OLY	7	0	0	0	4
2014	Slovakia	OLY	4	0	0	0	6
2015	Slovakia	WC	7	3	1	4	27
2016	Slovakia	WC	7	0	2	2	4
Junior totals			27	6	5	11	30
Senior totals			39	3	6	9	47

== Awards and achievements ==
SVK

- League championship with Dukla Trenčín — 2004
- First All-Star Team — 2004

WHL

- Western Second Team All-Star — 2005
- All-Rookie Team — 2005
- Vancouver Giants' Top Defenceman — 2005
- Vancouver Giants' Rookie of the Year — 2005

NHL

- All-Rookie Team — 2006
- NHL YoungStars Game appearance — 2007
- Barry Ashbee Trophy — 2011

Awards and achievements
Preceded by Patrick Eaves	Ottawa Senators' first-round draft pick 2004	Succeeded by Brian Lee
