= Emil Sandin =

Swedish ice hockey player

- Born: February 28, 1988 (age 38) Uppsala, Sweden
- Height: 5 ft 10 in (178 cm)
- Weight: 178 lb (81 kg; 12 st 10 lb)
- Position: Left wing
- Shoots: Left
- Played for: Brynäs IF; Rögle BK; IK Pantern
- NHL draft: 199th overall, 2008; Ottawa Senators
- Playing career: 2008–present

Emil Sandin (born February 28, 1988) is a Swedish former professional ice hockey player. He is a forward who most recently was a member of IK Pantern in Allsvenskan.

He was drafted 199th overall by the Ottawa Senators in the 2008 NHL entry draft.

== Career statistics ==
			Regular Season					Playoffs
Season	Team	League	GP	G	A	Pts	PIM	GP	G	A	Pts	PIM
2007–08	Brynäs IF	SEL	19	0	4	4	0	--	--	--	--	--
2008–09	Brynäs IF	SEL	53	6	11	17	6	4	0	0	0	4
2009–10	Brynäs IF	SEL	51	2	10	12	10	5	0	1	1	0
2010–11	Brynäs IF	SEL	26	0	3	3	6	--	--	--	--	--
SEL Totals			149	8	28	36	22	11	0	1	1	4
