= Alexandre R. Picard =

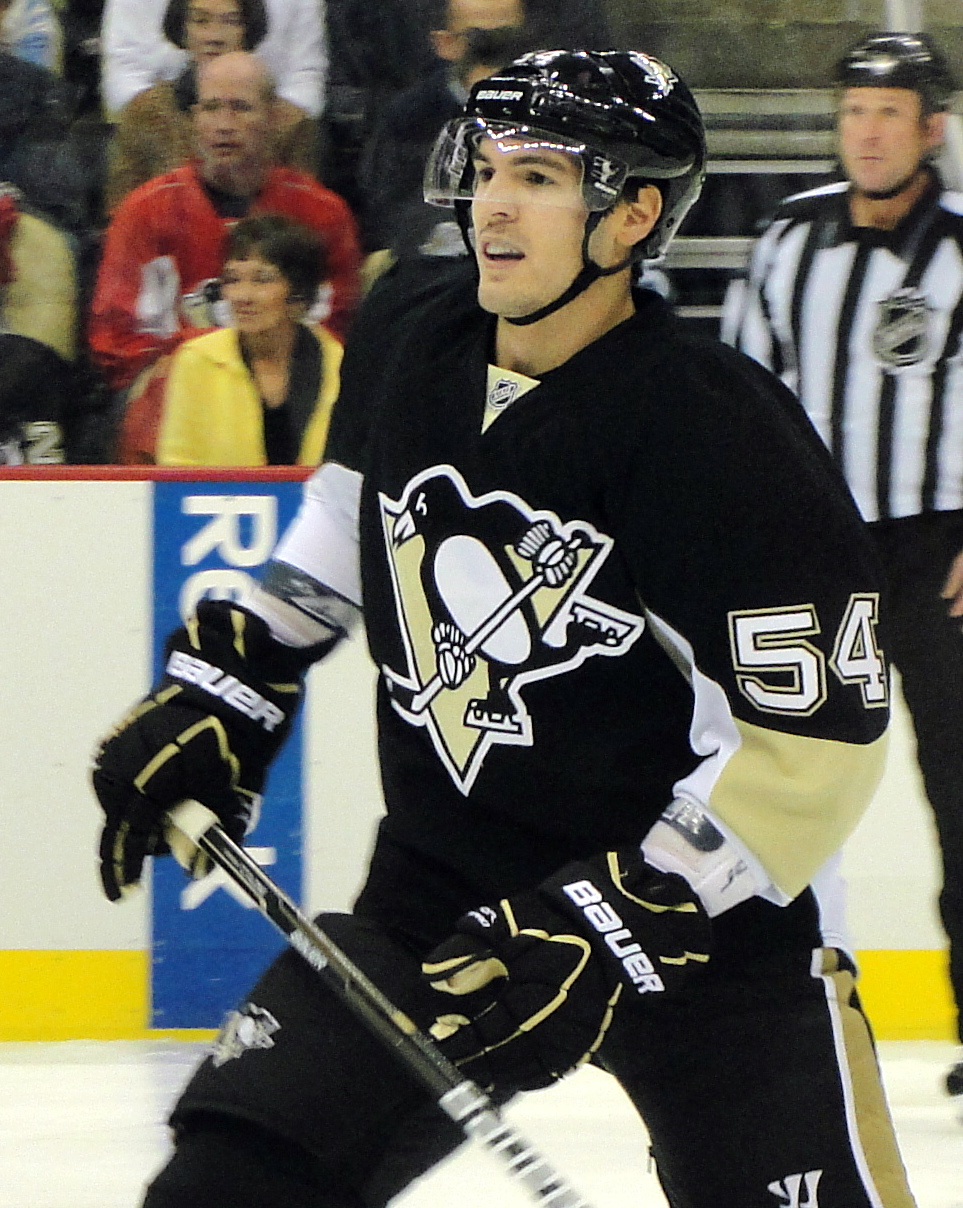
- Picard with the Pittsburgh Penguins in 2011
- Born: July 5, 1985 (age 41) Gatineau, Quebec, Canada
- Height: 6 ft 2 in (188 cm)
- Weight: 222 lb (101 kg; 15 st 12 lb)
- Position: Defence
- Shot: Left
- Played for: Philadelphia Flyers; Tampa Bay Lightning; Ottawa Senators; Carolina Hurricanes; Montreal Canadiens; Pittsburgh Penguins; HC Lev Praha; Graz 99ers ERC Ingolstadt; HC Fribourg-Gottéron; Düsseldorfer EG
- NHL draft: 85th overall, 2003; Philadelphia Flyers
- Playing career: 2005–2019

Alexandre Remi Picard (born July 5, 1985) is a Canadian former professional ice hockey defenceman who played in the National Hockey League (NHL).

== Playing career ==
As a youth, Picard played in the 1999 Quebec International Pee-Wee Hockey Tournament with the Outaouais Intrepides minor ice hockey team.

Picard began his career by playing major junior hockey for the Halifax Mooseheads of the QMJHL. The team was highly successful while he was there, helping them reach the President's Cup finals in 2002–03. Following that season, he was one of eight players on the team chosen in the 2003 NHL entry draft. However, he was among several players traded to the Cape Breton Screaming Eagles, but returned to the Mooseheads for his final season in the QMJHL.

Following the post-season, Picard went to Philadelphia, and began to work-out with the Philadelphia Phantoms, the AHL affiliate of the Philadelphia Flyers, who were in the Calder Cup finals. When teammate Randy Jones was injured in game two, he was signed to an amateur tryout contract to fill the roster spot. Picard played alongside veteran John Slaney in about a dozen shifts in games three and four to help the Phantoms sweep the Chicago Wolves.

A month later, the Flyers announced that they had signed Picard to a three-year contract to fill the spot left on the Phantoms roster by Patrick Sharp. Picard played his first full professional season for the Phantoms, and also played six games for the Flyers in four stints. He was also called up to be backup for the Flyers during the 2006 Stanley Cup Playoffs.

Picard began the 2006–07 NHL season with the Phantoms, but after just six games, he was called up to replace the injured Mike Rathje and began his rookie season in the NHL. Picard proved he could stay in the NHL when, on February 1, 2007, he recorded five assists in a game against the New Jersey Devils, setting a new rookie record and nearly tying the franchise record set by Eric Lindros.

Picard was dealt to the Tampa Bay Lightning on February 25, 2008 (along with a draft pick), for forward Vaclav Prospal.

On August 29, 2008, Picard was traded to the Ottawa Senators along with Filip Kuba and a first round draft pick for Andrej Meszaros. On February 12, 2010, Picard, who had been a healthy scratch for much of the season, along with Ottawa's second-round pick in the 2010 NHL entry draft, were traded to the Carolina Hurricanes in exchange for Matt Cullen.

On July 31, 2010, Picard signed a one-year contract with the Montreal Canadiens.

On July 5, 2011, Picard was signed to a one-year, two-way contract with the Pittsburgh Penguins worth $600,000 at the NHL level. He split the 2011–12 season between Pittsburgh and AHL affiliate, the Wilkes-Barre/Scranton Penguins, appearing in 17 NHL games for 4 assists.

Picard who was in a familiar role as a free agent at season's end, embarked upon a European career, signing with Czech club, HC Lev Praha of the Kontinental Hockey League. Picard followed his season in the KHL with stints in Austria and Germany before continuing his journeyman career by signing a two-year contract with Swiss club, HC Fribourg-Gottéron of the NLA on June 19, 2015.

When his contract was up in Switzerland, he moved back to Germany, signing with DEL outfit Düsseldorfer EG in April 2017.

Following his second season with DEG in 2018–19 and after a first round defeat to Augsburger Panther, Picard announced his retirement from a 14-year professional playing career.

== Career statistics ==
			Regular season					Playoffs
Season	Team	League	GP	G	A	Pts	PIM	GP	G	A	Pts	PIM
2000–01	Gatineau L'Intrépide	QMAAA	42	6	15	21	38	11	0	1	1	8
2001–02	Halifax Mooseheads	QMJHL	59	2	12	14	28	13	2	3	5	6
2002–03	Halifax Mooseheads	QMJHL	71	4	30	34	64	25	1	5	6	14
2003–04	Cape Breton Screaming Eagles	QMJHL	57	10	26	36	44	5	0	0	0	0
2004–05	Halifax Mooseheads	QMJHL	68	15	23	38	46	13	1	5	6	14
2004–05	Philadelphia Phantoms	AHL	—	—	—	—	—	2	0	0	0	0
2005–06	Philadelphia Phantoms	AHL	75	7	26	33	82	—	—	—	—	—
2005–06	Philadelphia Flyers	NHL	6	0	0	0	4	—	—	—	—	—
2006–07	Philadelphia Phantoms	AHL	6	1	2	3	2	—	—	—	—	—
2006–07	Philadelphia Flyers	NHL	62	3	19	22	17	—	—	—	—	—
2007–08	Philadelphia Phantoms	AHL	53	8	30	38	31	—	—	—	—	—
2007–08	Philadelphia Flyers	NHL	4	0	0	0	2	—	—	—	—	—
2007–08	Norfolk Admirals	AHL	1	0	0	0	0	—	—	—	—	—
2007–08	Tampa Bay Lightning	NHL	20	3	3	6	8	—	—	—	—	—
2008–09	Ottawa Senators	NHL	47	6	8	14	8	—	—	—	—	—
2009–10	Ottawa Senators	NHL	45	4	11	15	20	—	—	—	—	—
2009–10	Carolina Hurricanes	NHL	9	0	0	0	6	—	—	—	—	—
2010−11	Montreal Canadiens	NHL	43	3	5	8	17	—	—	—	—	—
2011–12	Wilkes–Barre/Scranton Penguins	AHL	43	8	13	21	20	12	0	6	6	6
2011−12	Pittsburgh Penguins	NHL	17	0	4	4	4	—	—	—	—	—
2012–13	HC Lev Praha	KHL	11	1	1	2	4	—	—	—	—	—
2013–14	Graz 99ers	EBEL	43	3	16	19	50	—	—	—	—	—
2014–15	ERC Ingolstadt	DEL	29	0	13	13	24	18	3	6	9	10
2015–16	HC Fribourg–Gottéron	NLA	37	2	7	9	2	5	0	2	2	2
2016–17	HC Fribourg–Gottéron	NLA	35	1	4	5	12	—	—	—	—	—
2017–18	Düsseldorfer EG	DEL	45	1	10	11	16	—	—	—	—	—
2018–19	Düsseldorfer EG	DEL	50	0	8	8	30	7	0	1	1	8
AHL totals			178	24	71	95	135	14	0	6	6	6
NHL totals			253	19	50	69	86	—	—	—	—	—

== Awards and honours ==
Award	Year
QMJHL
Second All-Star Team	2005
