= Filip Kuba =

Czech ice hockey player (born 1976)

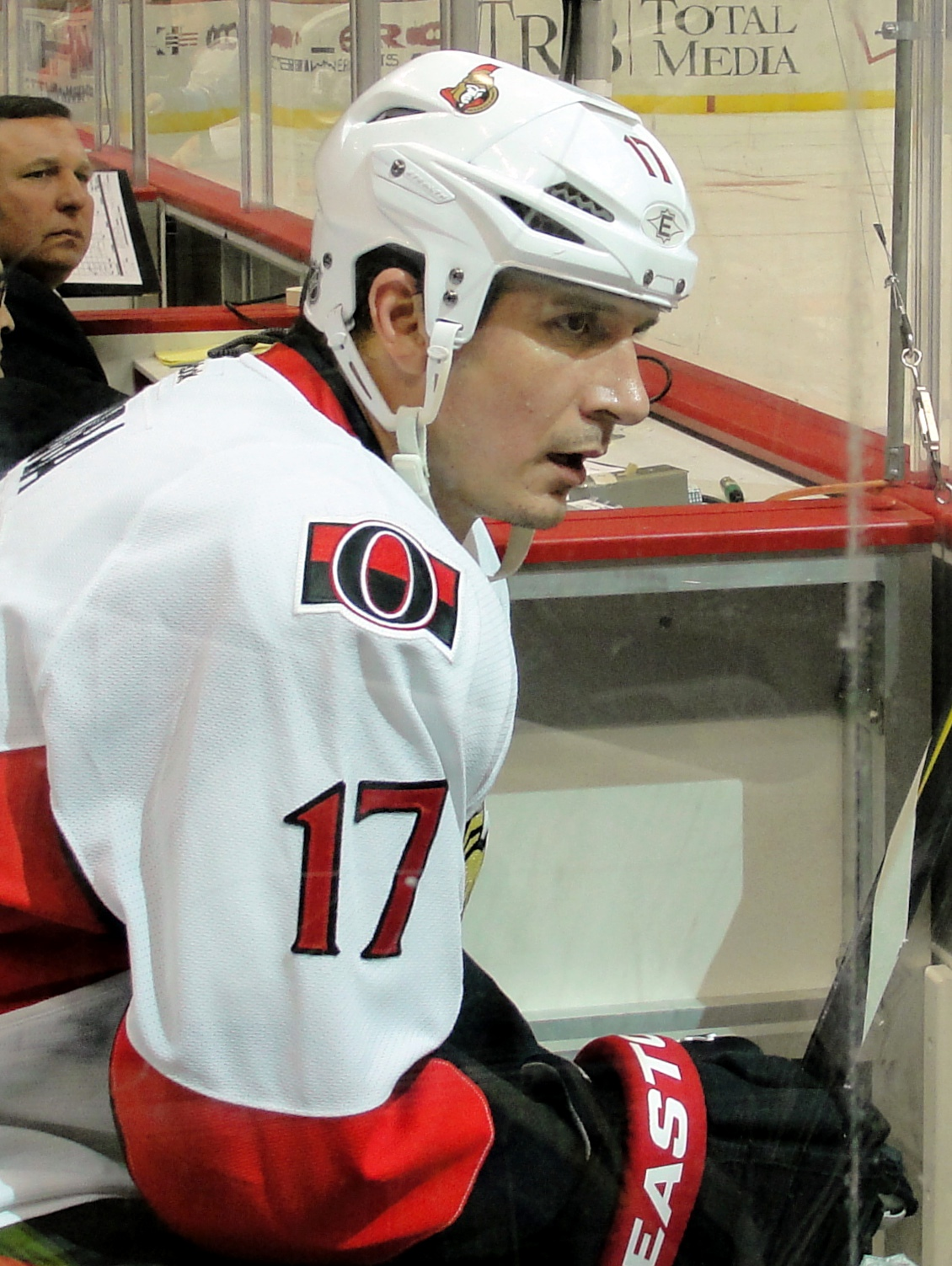
- Kuba with the Ottawa Senators in 2011
- Born: December 29, 1976 (age 49) Ostrava, Czechoslovakia
- Height: 6 ft 4 in (193 cm)
- Weight: 226 lb (103 kg; 16 st 2 lb)
- Position: Defense
- Shot: Left
- Played for: HC Vitkovice; Florida Panthers; Minnesota Wild; Tampa Bay Lightning; Ottawa Senators
- National team: Czech Republic
- NHL draft: 192nd overall, 1995; Florida Panthers
- Playing career: 1995–2013
Medal record
Representing Czech Republic
Ice hockey
Olympic Games
Bronze medal – third place	2006	Turin
World Championships
Gold medal – first place	2001	Germany

Filip Kuba (born December 29, 1976) is a Czech former professional ice hockey defenseman. Kuba most recently played for the Florida Panthers of the National Hockey League (NHL). He has previously played for the Minnesota Wild, Tampa Bay Lightning, and the Ottawa Senators of the NHL.

== Playing career ==
Kuba was drafted in the 1995 NHL entry draft by the Florida Panthers in the 8th round, 192nd overall, after playing with HC Vítkovice junior team in his native Czech Republic. Upon being drafted, he remained in the Czech Republic for one more season, playing with HC Vítkovice's senior team of the Czech Extraliga.

Moving to North America, he played the majority of his four seasons with the Panthers in the minor leagues before being traded to the Calgary Flames for Rocky Thompson on March 16, 2000. Before the 2000–01 season began, Kuba was left unprotected by the Flames for the 2000 NHL Expansion Draft and was claimed by the Minnesota Wild.

He played his first full NHL season with the Wild in the subsequent season and recorded 9 goals and 30 points. In 2003, the Wild advanced to the playoff semifinals, defeating division rivals Colorado Avalanche and Vancouver Canucks before falling to the Mighty Ducks of Anaheim in four games. Kuba set career playoff marks, appearing in 18 games and scoring 8 points during Minnesota's run. After five seasons with the Wild, he became an unrestricted free agent and on July 1, 2006, he signed with the Tampa Bay Lightning. He left the Wild as the franchise's all-time leader in scoring among defensemen with 33 goals and 132 points in 357 games. During his time with Minnesota, he was named team captain on two occasions, in November 2001 and November 2005, as part of the Wild's monthly rotating captaincy system. Kuba represented the Wild along with teammate Dwayne Roloson in the 2004 All-Star game.

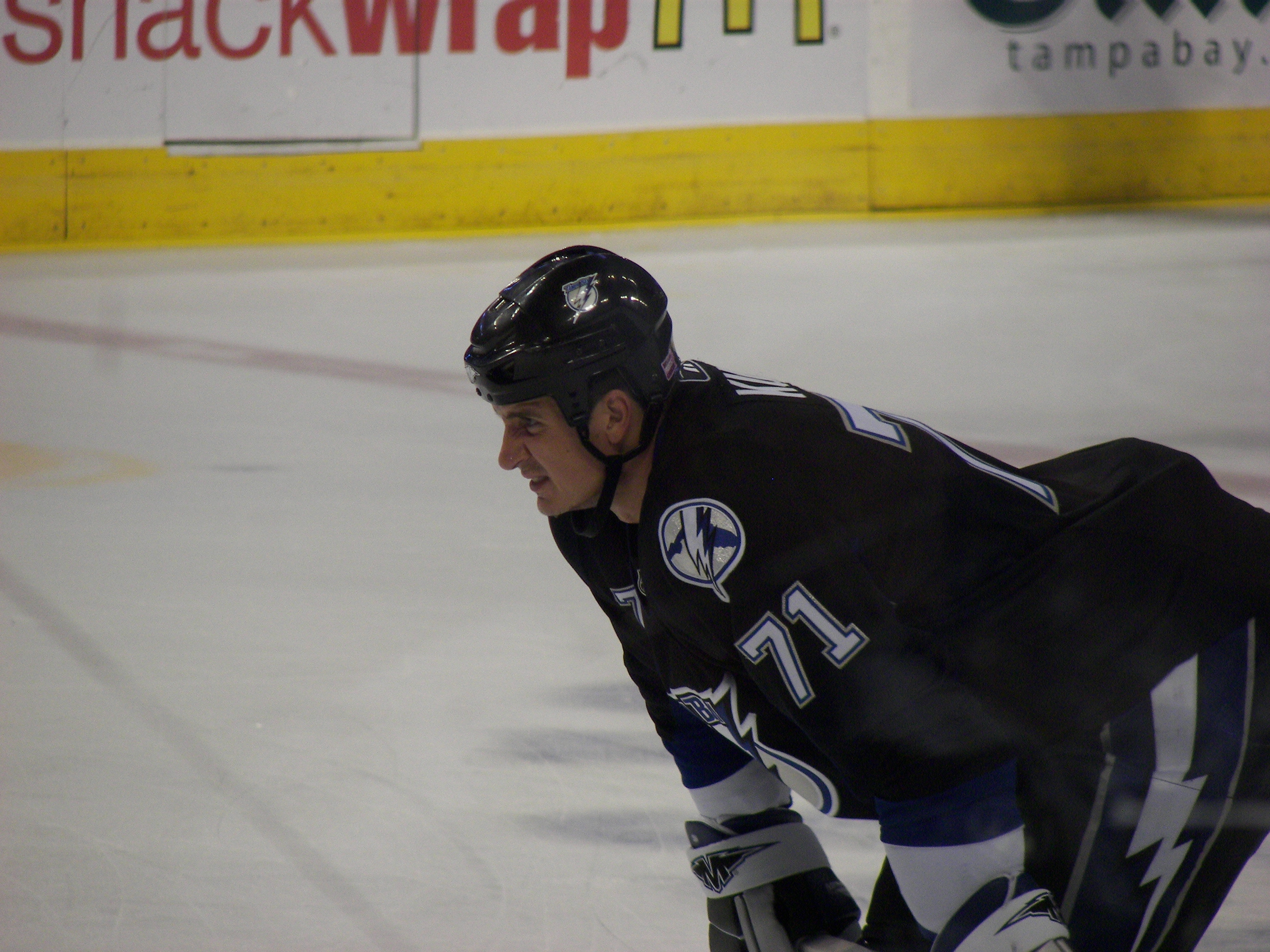
Kuba with the Tampa Bay Lightning in 2007.

In 2006–07, his first season with Tampa Bay, he recorded a career-high 15 goals, 22 assists and 37 points. On August 29, 2008, Kuba was traded to the Ottawa Senators, along with Alexandre Picard and San Jose's first-round draft pick for defenseman Andrej Meszaros.

With Ottawa, Kuba broke an NHL record for defensemen with an assist on October 25, 2008, against the Toronto Maple Leafs, giving him at least one point in each of the team's first eight games of the season. The previous best was set in 1981–82 by Brad Park, who recorded a point in each of the Boston Bruins' first seven games.

On July 1, 2012, Kuba returned to his original draft team, the Florida Panthers, signing a two-year contract worth $8 million. In the lockout-shortened 2012–13 season, Kuba was unable to live up to his contract registering 10 points in 44 games for the cellar-dwelling Panthers. On July 3, 2013, Kuba was bought out from the remaining year of his deal with the Panthers.

== International play ==
Kuba played his first game for the national team in 2001, and has played 30 times for the Czech national team (as of Jan 3 2009)

Played for the Czech Republic in:

- 2001 World Championships (gold)
- 2002 World Championships
- 2006 Winter Olympics (bronze)
- 2008 World Championships
- 2010 Czech Republic Olympic hockey team

== Career statistics ==
=== Regular season and playoffs ===
			Regular season					Playoffs
Season	Team	League	GP	G	A	Pts	PIM	GP	G	A	Pts	PIM
1994–95	HC Vítkovice	CZE U20	35	10	15	25	—	—	—	—	—	—
1995–96	HC Vítkovice	ELH	18	0	1	1	2	—	—	—	—	—
1996–97	Carolina Monarchs	AHL	51	0	12	12	38	—	—	—	—	—
1997–98	Beast of New Haven	AHL	77	4	13	17	58	3	1	1	2	0
1998–99	Florida Panthers	NHL	5	0	1	1	0	—	—	—	—	—
1998–99	Kentucky Thoroughblades	AHL	45	2	8	10	33	10	0	1	1	4
1999–2000	Florida Panthers	NHL	13	1	5	6	2	—	—	—	—	—
1999–2000	Houston Aeros	IHL	27	3	6	9	13	11	1	2	3	4
2000–01	Minnesota Wild	NHL	75	9	21	30	28	—	—	—	—	—
2001–02	Minnesota Wild	NHL	62	5	19	24	32	—	—	—	—	—
2002–03	Minnesota Wild	NHL	78	8	21	29	29	18	3	5	8	24
2003–04	Minnesota Wild	NHL	77	5	19	24	44	—	—	—	—	—
2005–06	Minnesota Wild	NHL	65	6	19	25	44	—	—	—	—	—
2006–07	Tampa Bay Lightning	NHL	81	15	22	37	36	6	1	4	5	4
2007–08	Tampa Bay Lightning	NHL	75	6	25	31	40	—	—	—	—	—
2008–09	Ottawa Senators	NHL	71	3	37	40	28	—	—	—	—	—
2009–10	Ottawa Senators	NHL	53	3	25	28	28	—	—	—	—	—
2010–11	Ottawa Senators	NHL	64	2	14	16	16	—	—	—	—	—
2011–12	Ottawa Senators	NHL	73	6	26	32	26	7	0	2	2	10
2012–13	HC Vítkovice Steel	ELH	11	0	4	4	10	—	—	—	—	—
2012–13	Florida Panthers	NHL	44	1	9	10	24	—	—	—	—	—
NHL totals			836	70	263	333	361	31	4	11	15	38

=== International ===
Year	Team	Event	Results	GP	G	A	Pts	PIM
2001	Czech Republic	WC	1st place, gold medalist(s)	9	1	1	2	8
2002	Czech Republic	WC	5th	7	0	3	3	18
2006	Czech Republic	OG	3rd place, bronze medalist(s)	8	1	0	1	0
2008	Czech Republic	WC	5th	7	1	2	3	4
2010	Czech Republic	OG	7th	5	0	1	1	0
Senior totals				36	3	7	10	30

Preceded by Jim Dowd	Minnesota Wild team captain November 2001	Succeeded by Brad Brown
Preceded by Alex Henry	Minnesota Wild team captain November 2005	Succeeded by Willie Mitchell
