= 2008–09 Toronto Maple Leafs season =

NHL hockey team season

2008–09 Toronto Maple Leafs
- Division: 5th Northeast
- Conference: 12th Eastern
- 2008–09 record: 34–35–13
- Home record: 16–16–9
- Road record: 18–19–4
- Goals for: 219
- Goals against: 257

Team information
- General manager: Cliff Fletcher (Sept–Nov) interim Brian Burke (Nov–Apr)
- Coach: Ron Wilson
- Captain: Vacant
- Alternate captains: Nik Antropov (Oct.–Mar.); Tomas Kaberle; Pavel Kubina; Brad May (Mar.–Apr.); Jamal Mayers; Dominic Moore (Oct.–Mar.)
- Arena: Air Canada Centre
- Average attendance: 19,243 (102%)

Team leaders
- Goals: Jason Blake (25)
- Assists: Matt Stajan (35)
- Points: Jason Blake (57)
- Penalty minutes: Pavel Kubina (79)
- Plus/minus: Alexei Ponikarovsky (+6)
- Wins: Vesa Toskala (22)
- Goals against average: Vesa Toskala (3.26)

The 2008–09 Toronto Maple Leafs season was the franchise's 92nd, and their 82nd as the Maple Leafs. The Leafs did not qualify for the playoffs for the fourth consecutive season for the first time in franchise history.

== Offseason ==
The Leafs faced an off-season challenge to hire a general manager. Brian Burke was a favourite for the position held by interim general manager Cliff Fletcher, but Burke opted to stay with the Anaheim Ducks. He was not given permission to talk to the Leafs about their vacancy by Ducks owner Henry Samueli. Burke had one more year left on his contract as the general manager of the Ducks, and those close to him say he was interested in the Maple Leafs' job.

On May 7, the Leafs fired head coach Paul Maurice, along with two assistant coaches, after missing the playoffs in back-to-back seasons. On May 8, the Leafs asked the Vancouver Canucks permission to speak to Dave Nonis about hiring him for a position with the club.

In mid-May, there were rumours that Wayne Gretzky was in the running for a position with the Maple Leafs. Gretzky responded to the rumours linking him to the Toronto Maple Leafs by stating that his focus was on the Phoenix Coyotes and developing their young talent.

On June 10, Ron Wilson was hired as the new head coach of the Toronto Maple Leafs. Wilson was fired in May by the San Jose Sharks after the Sharks lost to the Dallas Stars in the second round of the NHL playoffs. Wilson has also coached the Anaheim Ducks and the Washington Capitals. The former U.S. college player spent parts of three NHL seasons with the Leafs in the 1970s.

The Toronto Maple Leafs hired Al Coates as their player-personnel director on June 16. Coates comes to Toronto after spending the previous six seasons with Anaheim. Coates has spent more than 30 years in pro hockey and has been part of two Stanley Cup-winning teams (2007 with the Anaheim Ducks and 1989 with the Calgary Flames).

The move perpetuated speculation that Anaheim general manager Brian Burke would become the Maple Leafs' GM once his deal with the Ducks expired in 2009. The fact that new head coach Ron Wilson played hockey with Burke at the Providence College sparked further rumors about Burke potentially joining the club.

Former NHL star Joe Nieuwendyk was named as general manager Cliff Fletcher's special assistant on July 8. While playing for the Florida Panthers, Nieuwendyk gained experience as a special consultant to GM Jacques Martin.

Throughout the off-season, the Maple Leafs have been involved in numerous transactions. On June 24, the Toronto Maple Leafs put goaltender Andrew Raycroft and forward Kyle Wellwood on waivers. Moreover, interim GM Cliff Fletcher informed Darcy Tucker that he is to be bought out of his three-year contract; however, this decision was not made official until June 25.

The Maple Leafs bought out goaltender Andrew Raycroft on June 28, making him eligible for free agency on July 1. When the free agent signing period began on July 1, Toronto signed defenceman Jeff Finger, goaltender Curtis Joseph and former Dallas Stars forward Niklas Hagman. Another transaction was made on July 3 when Toronto traded for former Montreal Canadiens forward Mikhail Grabovski in exchange for the rights to Greg Pateryn and a second-round draft pick in 2010. The Leafs also re-signed forwards Dominic Moore, John Mitchell and Greg Scott. On July 14, the Maple Leafs acquired forward Ryan Hollweg in a trade with the New York Rangers for a fifth-round draft pick in 2009.

== Regular season ==
With a young roster, the Maple Leafs were expected to have a lacklustre season. This proved to be correct, as they fell out of the playoff race relatively early and showed little sign of recovery. However, they showed signs of improvement in February and March 2009, during which they had a stretch of seven consecutive games that went into overtime. The Leafs lost the first two in shootouts, then won four in a row with two overtime wins and two shootout wins, followed by an overtime loss.

In November 2008, Brian Burke obtained his release from the Anaheim Ducks and joined the Maple Leafs as president and general manager.

The Maple Leafs were mathematically eliminated from the playoffs on March 31, 2009, with six games remaining in the season.

The Maple Leafs finished the season with 286 goals allowed (excluding seven shootout goals), the most out of all 30 teams. The Maple Leafs also struggled on the penalty kill, finishing 30th overall in penalty-kill percentage, at 74.68%.

=== Divisional standings ===
Northeast Division
		GP	W	L	OTL	GF	GA	Pts
**1**	**z – Boston Bruins**	**82**	**53**	**19**	**10**	**274**	**196**	**116**
**2**	**Montreal Canadiens**	**82**	**41**	**30**	**11**	**249**	**247**	**93**
3	Buffalo Sabres	82	41	32	9	250	234	91
4	Ottawa Senators	82	36	35	11	217	237	83
5	Toronto Maple Leafs	82	34	35	13	250	293	81

=== Conference standings ===
Eastern Conference
R		Div	GP	W	L	OTL	GF	GA	Pts
**1**	**z – Boston Bruins**	**NE**	**82**	**53**	**19**	**10**	**274**	**196**	116
**2**	**y – Washington Capitals**	**SE**	**82**	**50**	**24**	**8**	**272**	**245**	108
**3**	**y – New Jersey Devils**	**AT**	**82**	**51**	**27**	**4**	**244**	**209**	106
**4**	**Pittsburgh Penguins**	**AT**	**82**	**45**	**28**	**9**	**264**	**239**	99
**5**	**Philadelphia Flyers**	**AT**	**82**	**44**	**27**	**11**	**264**	**238**	99
**6**	**Carolina Hurricanes**	**SE**	**82**	**45**	**30**	**7**	**239**	**226**	97
**7**	**New York Rangers**	**AT**	**82**	**43**	**30**	**9**	**210**	**218**	95
**8**	**Montreal Canadiens**	**NE**	**82**	**41**	**30**	**11**	**249**	**247**	93
8.5
9	Florida Panthers	SE	82	41	30	11	234	231	93
10	Buffalo Sabres	NE	82	41	32	9	250	234	91
11	Ottawa Senators	NE	82	36	35	11	217	237	83
12	Toronto Maple Leafs	NE	82	34	35	13	250	293	81
13	Atlanta Thrashers	SE	82	35	41	6	257	280	76
14	Tampa Bay Lightning	SE	82	24	40	18	210	279	66
15	New York Islanders	AT	82	26	47	9	201	279	61

bold – qualified for playoffs, y – division winner, z – placed first in conference (and division)

AT – Atlantic Division, NE – Northeast Division, SE – Southeast Division

== Schedule and results ==
2008–09 Game Log
October 4–3–3 (Home 1–2–2, Road 3–1–1)

Game	Date	Opponent	Score	Location	Attendance	Record	Points
1	October 9, 2008	@ Detroit Red Wings	3–2	Joe Louis Arena	20,066	1–0–0	2
2	October 11, 2008	Montreal Canadiens	1–6	Air Canada Centre	19,370	1–1–0	2
3	October 13, 2008	St. Louis Blues	4–5 (SO)	Air Canada Centre	19,045	1–1–1	3
4	October 17, 2008	@ New York Rangers	0–1 (SO)	Madison Square Garden	18,200	1–1–2	4
5	October 18, 2008	@ Pittsburgh Penguins	1–4	Mellon Arena	17,033	1–2–2	4
6	October 21, 2008	Anaheim Ducks	2–3 (SO)	Air Canada Centre	19,222	1–2–3	5
7	October 23, 2008	@ Boston Bruins	4–2	TD Banknorth Garden	12,274	2–2–3	7
8	October 25, 2008	Ottawa Senators	3–2	Air Canada Centre	19,232	3–2–3	9
9	October 28, 2008	Tampa Bay Lightning	2–3	Air Canada Centre	19,348	3–3–3	9
10	October 29, 2008	@ New Jersey Devils	6–5 (SO)	Prudential Center	14,119	4–3–3	11

November 4–6–3 (Home 3–2–2, Road 1–4–1)

Game	Date	Opponent	Score	Location	Attendance	Record	Points
11	November 1, 2008	New York Rangers	5–2	Air Canada Centre	19,179	5–3–3	13
12	November 2, 2008	@ Carolina Hurricanes	4–6	RBC Center	15,635	5–4–3	13
13	November 4, 2008	Carolina Hurricanes	4–5 (OT)	Air Canada Centre	19,266	5–4–4	14
14	November 6, 2008	@ Boston Bruins	2–5	TD Banknorth Garden	15,391	5–5–4	14
15	November 8, 2008 †	Montreal Canadiens	6–3	Air Canada Centre	19,512	6–5–4	16
16	November 11, 2008	@ Calgary Flames	3–4	Pengrowth Saddledome	19,289	6–6–4	16
17	November 13, 2008	@ Edmonton Oilers	5–2	Rexall Place	16,839	7–6–4	18
18	November 15, 2008	@ Vancouver Canucks	2–4	General Motors Place	18,630	7–7–4	18
19	November 17, 2008	Boston Bruins	2–3	Air Canada Centre	19,410	7–8–4	18
20	November 22, 2008	Chicago Blackhawks	4–5 (OT)	Air Canada Centre	19,474	7–8–5	19
21	November 25, 2008	Atlanta Thrashers	3–6	Air Canada Centre	19,297	7–9–5	19
22	November 27, 2008	@ Ottawa Senators	1–2 (SO)	Scotiabank Place	19,703	7–9–6	20
23	November 29, 2008	Philadelphia Flyers	4–2	Air Canada Centre	19,387	8–9–6	22

December 7–7–0 (Home 3–2–0, Road 4–5–0)

Game	Date	Opponent	Score	Location	Attendance	Record	Points
24	December 1, 2008	@ Los Angeles Kings	3–1	Staples Center	15,052	9–9–6	24
25	December 2, 2008	@ San Jose Sharks	2–5	HP Pavilion at San Jose	17,496	9–10–6	24
26	December 4, 2008	@ Phoenix Coyotes	3–6	Jobing.com Arena	13,777	9–11–6	24
27	December 6, 2008	Washington Capitals	1–2	Air Canada Centre	19,416	9–12–6	24
28	December 8, 2008	New York Islanders	4–2	Air Canada Centre	19,309	10–12–6	26
29	December 12, 2008	@ Buffalo Sabres	2–1	HSBC Arena	18,211	11–12–6	28
30	December 16, 2008	New Jersey Devils	3–2 (SO)	Air Canada Centre	19,315	12–12–6	30
31	December 18, 2008	@ Boston Bruins	5–8	TD Banknorth Garden	17,565	12–13–6	30
32	December 20, 2008	@ Pittsburgh Penguins	7–3	Mellon Arena	17,053	13–13–6	32
33	December 22, 2008	@ Atlanta Thrashers	6–2	Philips Arena	16,413	14–13–6	34
34	December 23, 2008	Dallas Stars	2–8	Air Canada Centre	19,269	14–14–6	34
35	December 26, 2008	@ New York Islanders	1–4	Nassau Veterans Memorial Coliseum	15,173	14–15–6	34
36	December 28, 2008	@ Washington Capitals	1–4	Verizon Center	18,277	14–16–6	34
37	December 30, 2008	Atlanta Thrashers	4–3 (OT)	Air Canada Centre	19,260	15–16–6	36

January 4–7–2 (Home 2–4–1, Road 2–3–1)

Game	Date	Opponent	Score	Location	Attendance	Record	Points
38	January 1, 2009	Buffalo Sabres	1–4	Air Canada Centre	19,176	15–17–6	36
39	January 3, 2009	Ottawa Senators	3–1	Air Canada Centre	19,406	16–17–6	38
40	January 6, 2009	Florida Panthers	2–4	Air Canada Centre	19,197	16–18–6	38
41	January 8, 2009	@ Montreal Canadiens	2–6	Bell Centre	21,273	16–19–6	38
42	January 10, 2009	@ Philadelphia Flyers	1–4	Wachovia Center	19,787	16–20–6	38
43	January 13, 2009	Nashville Predators	0–2	Air Canada Centre	19,223	16–21–6	38
44	January 15, 2009	@ Carolina Hurricanes	6–4	RBC Center	18,037	17–21–6	40
45	January 16, 2009	@ Atlanta Thrashers	3–4 (OT)	Philips Arena	15,619	17–21–7	41
46	January 19, 2009	Carolina Hurricanes	0–2	Air Canada Centre	19,018	17–22–7	41
47	January 21, 2009	Boston Bruins	3–4 (SO)	Air Canada Centre	19,258	17–22–8	42
48	January 27, 2009	@ Minnesota Wild	1–6	Xcel Energy Center	18,568	17–23–8	42
49	January 29, 2009	@ Colorado Avalanche	7–4	Pepsi Center	15,216	18–23–8	44
50	January 31, 2009	Pittsburgh Penguins	5–4	Air Canada Centre	19,570	19–23–8	46

February 6–3–4 (Home 2–1–3, Road 4–2–1)

Game	Date	Opponent	Score	Location	Attendance	Record	Points
51	February 3, 2009	Florida Panthers	3–4 (OT)	Air Canada Centre	19,095	19–23–9	47
52	February 4, 2009	@ Buffalo Sabres	0–5	HSBC Arena	17,355	19–24–9	47
53	February 7, 2009	@ Montreal Canadiens	5–2	Bell Centre	21,273	20–24–9	49
54	February 10, 2009	@ Florida Panthers	4–5 (OT)	BankAtlantic Center	13,764	20–24–10	50
55	February 12, 2009	@ Tampa Bay	4–6	St. Pete Times Forum	16,526	20–25–10	50
56	February 14, 2009	Pittsburgh Penguins	6–2	Air Canada Centre	19,365	21–25–10	52
57	February 17, 2009	Buffalo Sabres	1–4	Air Canada Centre	19,287	21–26–10	52
58	February 19, 2009	Columbus Blue Jackets	3–4 (SO)	Air Canada Centre	19,179	21–26–11	53
59	February 21, 2009	Vancouver Canucks	2–3 (SO)	Air Canada Centre	19,504	21–26–12	54
60	February 22, 2009	@ New York Rangers	3–2 (OT)	Madison Square Garden	18,200	22–26–12	56
61	February 25, 2009	New York Rangers	2–1 (SO)	Air Canada Centre	19,383	23–26–12	58
62	February 26, 2009	@ New York Islanders	5–4 (SO)	Nassau Veterans Memorial Coliseum	12,201	24–26–12	60
63	February 28, 2009	@ Ottawa Senators	4–3 (OT)	Scotiabank Place	20,050	25–26–12	62

March 6–6–1 (Home 3–3–1, Road 3–3–0)

Game	Date	Opponent	Score	Location	Attendance	Record	Points
64	March 3, 2009	New Jersey Devils	2–3 (OT)	Air Canada Centre	19,389	25–26–13	63
65	March 5, 2009	@ Washington Capitals	2–1	Verizon Center	18,277	26–26–13	65
66	March 7, 2009	Edmonton Oilers	1–4	Air Canada Centre	19,364	26–27–13	65
67	March 9, 2009	@ Ottawa Senators	1–2	Scotiabank Place	18,898	26–28–13	65
68	March 10, 2009	New York Islanders	3–2 (OT)	Air Canada Centre	19,041	27–28–13	67
69	March 12, 2009	Tampa Bay Lightning	1–4	Air Canada Centre	19,209	27–29–13	67
70	March 14, 2009	Calgary Flames	8–6	Air Canada Centre	19,356	28–29–13	69
71	March 17, 2009	@ Tampa Bay Lightning	4–3 (SO)	St. Pete Times Forum	18,793	29–29–13	71
72	March 19, 2009	@ Florida Panthers	1–3	BankAtlantic Center	15,467	29–30–13	71
73	March 21, 2009	@ Montreal Canadiens	5–2	Bell Centre	21,273	30–30–13	73
74	March 24, 2009	Washington Capitals	3–2 (SO)	Air Canada Centre	19,362	31–30–13	75
75	March 27, 2009	@ Buffalo Sabres	3–5	HSBC Arena	18,620	31–31–13	75
76	March 28, 2009	Boston Bruins	5–7	Air Canada Centre	19,360	31–32–13	75

April 3–3–0 (Home 2–2–0, Road 1–1–0)

Game	Date	Opponent	Score	Location	Attendance	Record	Points
77	April 1, 2009	Philadelphia Flyers	3–2	Air Canada Centre	19,340	32–32–13	77
78	April 3, 2009	@ Philadelphia Flyers	5–8	Wachovia Center	19,727	32–33–13	77
79	April 4, 2009	Montreal Canadiens	2–6	Air Canada Centre	19,516	32–34–13	77
80	April 7, 2009	@ New Jersey Devils	4–1	Prudential Center	15,046	33–34–13	79
81	April 8, 2009	Buffalo Sabres	1–3	Air Canada Centre	19,516	33–35–13	79
82	April 11, 2009	Ottawa Senators	5–2	Air Canada Centre	19,370	34–35–13	81

† Hockey Hall of Fame Game
Schedule

=== Playoffs ===
The Toronto Maple Leafs failed to qualify for the 2009 Stanley Cup playoffs.

== Player statistics ==
Final stats

=== Skaters ===
Regular season
Player	GP	G	A	Pts	+/-	PIM
Jason Blake	78	25	38	63	−2	40
Alexei Ponikarovsky	82	23	38	61	+6	38
Matt Stajan	76	15	40	55	−4	54
Mikhail Grabovski	78	20	28	48	−8	92
Nik Antropov^{‡}	63	21	25	46	−13	24
Niklas Hagman	65	22	20	42	−5	4
Dominic Moore^{‡}	63	12	29	41	−1	69
Pavel Kubina	82	14	26	40	−15	94
Tomas Kaberle	57	4	27	31	−8	8
Nikolai Kulemin	73	15	16	31	−8	18
Lee Stempniak^{†}	61	11	20	31	−9	31
John Mitchell	76	12	17	29	−16	33
Ian White	71	10	16	26	+6	57
Jeff Finger	66	6	17	23	−7	43
Jamal Mayers	71	7	9	16	−7	82
Luke Schenn	70	2	12	14	−12	71
Anton Stralman	38	1	12	13	−2	20
Boyd Devereaux	23	6	5	11	+3	2
Mike Van Ryn	27	3	8	11	+2	14
Jeremy Williams	11	5	2	7	+2	2
Jonas Frogren	41	1	6	7	0	28
Jeff Hamilton	15	3	3	6	+2	4
Alexander Steen^{‡}	20	2	2	4	−4	6
Jiri Tlusty	14	0	4	4	0	0
Brad May^{†}	38	1	1	2	−5	61
Ryan Hollweg	25	0	2	2	−7	38
Phil Oreskovic	10	1	1	2	−2	21
Jaime Sifers	23	0	2	2	−4	18
Christian Hanson	5	1	1	2	−1	2
Carlo Colaiacovo^{‡}	10	0	1	1	−2	6
Andre Deveaux	21	0	1	1	−3	75
Jay Harrison	7	0	1	1	−2	10
Tim Stapleton	4	1	0	1	−3	0
Ben Ondrus	11	0	0	0	−4	34
Kris Newbury	1	0	0	0	0	2

=== Goaltenders ===
Regular season
Player	GP	GS	TOI	W	L	OT	GA	GAA	SA	SV%	SO	G	A	PIM
Vesa Toskala	53	52	3056	22	17	11	166	3.26	1518	.891	1	0	0	2
Curtis Joseph	21	11	841	5	9	1	50	3.57	383	.869	0	0	0	0
Martin Gerber^{†}	12	12	705	6	5	0	38	3.23	402	.905	0	0	0	0
Justin Pogge	7	6	372	1	4	1	27	4.36	173	.844	0	0	0	0

^{†}Denotes player spent time with another team before joining Maple Leafs. Stats reflect time with Maple Leafs only.
^{‡}Traded mid-season.
Bold/italics denotes franchise record.

== Awards and records ==
=== Milestones ===
Regular Season
Player	Milestone	Reached

== Transactions ==
On October 6, the team placed Mark Bell on waivers.

=== Trades ===
June 19, 2008	To Toronto Maple Leafs Jamal Mayers	To St. Louis Blues 3rd-round pick in 2008 – James Livingston
June 20, 2008	To Toronto Maple Leafs 1st-round (5th overall) pick in 2008 – Luke Schenn	To New York Islanders 1st-round (7th overall) pick in 2008 – Colin Wilson; Two conditional picks – Shawn Lalonde and Mat Clark
July 3, 2008	To Toronto Maple Leafs Mikhail Grabovski	To Montreal Canadiens Greg Pateryn; 2nd-round pick in 2010 – Jared Knight
July 14, 2008	To Toronto Maple Leafs Ryan Hollweg	To New York Rangers 5th-round pick in 2009 – Andy Bathgate
September 2, 2008	To Toronto Maple Leafs Mike Van Ryn	To Florida Panthers Bryan McCabe; 4th-round pick in 2010 – Sam Brittain
November 24, 2008	To Toronto Maple Leafs Lee Stempniak	To St. Louis Blues Alexander Steen; Carlo Colaiacovo
January 7, 2009	To Toronto Maple Leafs Brad May	To Anaheim Ducks Conditional 6th-round draft pick in 2010 (condition not satisfied)
January 21, 2009	To Toronto Maple Leafs Ryan Hamilton	To Minnesota Wild Robbie Earl
March 4, 2009	To Toronto Maple Leafs 2nd-round draft pick in 2009 – Kenny Ryan; Conditional draft pick	To New York Rangers Nik Antropov
March 4, 2009	To Toronto Maple Leafs 2nd-round draft pick in 2009 – Jesse Blacker	To Buffalo Sabres Dominic Moore
March 4, 2009	To Toronto Maple Leafs Olaf Kolzig; Jamie Heward; Andy Rogers; 4th-round pick in 2009	To Tampa Bay Lightning Richard Petiot

=== Free agents ===
Player	Former team	Contract Terms
Curtis Joseph	Calgary Flames	1 year, $700,000
Jeff Finger	Colorado Avalanche	4 years, $14 million
Niklas Hagman	Dallas Stars	4 years, $12 million
Christian Hanson	University of Notre Dame	2 years, $1.575 million
Tyler Bozak	University of Denver	2 years, entry level

Player	New team
Darcy Tucker	Colorado Avalanche
Andrew Raycroft	Colorado Avalanche
Kyle Wellwood	Vancouver Canucks
Scott Clemmensen	New Jersey Devils
Andy Wozniewski	St. Louis Blues

=== Claimed from waivers ===
Player	Former team	Date claimed off waivers
Martin Gerber	Ottawa Senators	March 4, 2009
Erik Reitz	New York Rangers	March 4, 2009

== Draft picks ==
Toronto's picks at the 2008 NHL entry draft in Ottawa.

Round	Pick	Player	Position	Nationality	Club Team
1	5	Luke Schenn	(D)	Canada	Kelowna Rockets (WHL)
2	60 (from Pittsburgh)	Jimmy Hayes	(RW)	United States	Lincoln Stars (USHL)
4	98	Mikhail Stefanovich	(C)	Belarus	Quebec Remparts (QMJHL)
5	128	Greg Pateryn	(D)	United States	Ohio Junior Blue Jackets (USHL)
5	129 (from Phoenix)	Joel Champagne	(C)	Canada	Chicoutimi Saguenéens (QMJHL)
5	130 (from Florida)	Jerome Flaake	(LW)	Germany	Kölner Haie (DEL)
6	158	Grant Rollheiser	(G)	Canada	Trail Smoke Eaters (BCHL)
7	188	Andrew MacWilliam	(D)	Canada	Camrose Kodiaks (AJHL)

== See also ==
- 2008–09 NHL season

== Farm teams ==
- The Maple Leafs continue their affiliation with the Toronto Marlies of the American Hockey League.
