= 2008–09 Pittsburgh Penguins season =

NHL team season (won 3rd Stanley Cup)

2008–09 Pittsburgh Penguins
- Stanley Cup champions
- Eastern Conference champions
- Division: 2nd Atlantic
- Conference: 4th Eastern
- 2008–09 record: 45–28–9
- Home record: 25–13–3
- Road record: 20–15–6
- Goals for: 264
- Goals against: 239

Team information
- General manager: Ray Shero
- Coach: Michel Therrien (Oct.–Feb.); Dan Bylsma (Feb.–Jun.)
- Captain: Sidney Crosby
- Alternate captains: Evgeni Malkin (Oct., Feb.–Jun.); Brooks Orpik (Oct., Feb.); Hal Gill (Nov.); Rob Scuderi (Nov.); Matt Cooke (Dec.); Jordan Staal (Dec.); Petr Sykora (Jan.); Ryan Whitney (Jan.); Sergei Gonchar (Feb.–Jun.)
- Arena: Mellon Arena
- Average attendance: 16,975; 102.6% capacity Total: 695,997

Team leaders
- Goals: Evgeni Malkin (35)
- Assists: Evgeni Malkin (78)
- Points: Evgeni Malkin (113)
- Penalty minutes: Eric Godard (171)
- Plus/minus: Rob Scuderi (+23)
- Wins: Marc-Andre Fleury (35)
- Goals against average: John Curry (2.40)

The 2008–09 Pittsburgh Penguins season was the 42nd season of Pittsburgh Penguins in the National Hockey League (NHL). The regular season began with two games against the Ottawa Senators in Stockholm, Sweden on October 4 and October 5, 2008.

On February 15, the team had a record of 27–25–5 and was five points out of playoff position. The organization fired head coach Michel Therrien and replaced him with Dan Bylsma, head coach of the organization's American Hockey League affiliate in Wilkes-Barre. On February 26, the team traded defenseman Ryan Whitney to the Anaheim Ducks in return for Chris Kunitz. Before the trade deadline on March 4, they acquired Bill Guerin from the New York Islanders. Under Bylsma, the team went 18–3–4, including 10–1–2 in March, and lost only one home game.

The Penguins qualified for the playoffs for the third consecutive season. They did not repeat as champions of the Atlantic Division, but earned the fourth seed in the Eastern Conference with 99 points. They began the 2009 Stanley Cup playoffs on April 15 against the Philadelphia Flyers. They beat the Flyers, Washington Capitals, and Carolina Hurricanes to earn a second-straight berth in the Stanley Cup Final. In the Finals, the Penguins defeated the Detroit Red Wings in seven games in a rematch of the previous season's Stanley Cup Final to win the franchise's third league title. To date, this is the only Stanley Cup the Penguins have won without having home-ice advantage. They became the first team since the 1983-84 Edmonton Oilers to win the Stanley Cup after losing it the previous year.

== Pre-season ==
Due to their appearance in the 2008 Stanley Cup Final, the Penguins had less than three weeks before free agency began to settle numerous contract decisions. The Penguins added nine free agents and lost ten to other teams. Head Coach Michel Therrien also signed a new three-year contract that replaced the last year of his existing contract, with an increase in salary. The new contract was projected to keep him with the Penguins through the 2010–11 season.

The Penguins renewed 99% of their season ticket sales from the 2007–08 season; having sold out 67 consecutive games at Mellon Arena dating back to the 2006–07 season. In July, ESPN named Pittsburgh the top team in the Eastern Conference, and Sporting News predicted the team would finish in the league's fifth overall position.

The team commenced training camp on September 16, 2008, in Pittsburgh. They played five pre-season games in preparation for the season, finishing with a 4–0–1 record. The team concluded its preparation for the season with practices in Stockholm. Defensemen Sergei Gonchar was injured in the pre-season opener and originally anticipated to miss "four to six months." He appeared for the first time on February 14, 2009. With Gonchar out of the lineup and previous season's two other alternate captains Ryan Malone and Gary Roberts departed, the Penguins began the season with no returning alternate captains in the lineup. Therrien selected two alternate captains each month; Evgeni Malkin and Brooks Orpik served the role throughout the opening month.

2008–09 Preseason Game Log: 4–0–1 (Home: 1–0–1; Road: 3–0–0)

#	Date	Visitor	Score	Home	OT	Decision	Attendance	Record	Recap
1	September 20	Tampa Bay	5–4	Pittsburgh	SO	Fleury	16,287	0–0–1	
2	September 22	Pittsburgh	3–2	Tampa Bay		Curry	14,707	1–0–1	
3	September 24	Toronto	2–3	Pittsburgh		Sabourin	15,731	2–0–1	
4	September 26	Pittsburgh	5–4	Toronto		Fleury	18,884	3–0–1	
5	October 2	Pittsburgh	4–1	Jokerit (SML)		Fleury	13,464	4–0–1	

Legend: = Win = Loss = OT/SO Loss

== Regular season ==
=== October ===
"It's a long season... We're going to get better."

— Michel Therrien, after the Penguins games in Sweden.

On September 27, the Penguins embarked on a trip for Sweden where they opened the season against the Ottawa Senators, at the Stockholm Globe Arena. The Penguins were one of four teams to participate in NHL Premiere which began the season with games in Prague, Czech Republic and Stockholm, Sweden. Pittsburgh won the opening game of the season in overtime, getting two goals from Tyler Kennedy, including the game-winner. The game was broadcast on Mellon Arena's JumboTron where 2,300 spectators watched the game. The team returned to Pittsburgh after ten days in Europe and a 1–1–0 record. The Penguins hosted the Trib Total Media Faceoff Festival 2008 prior to their first four home games, allowing fans to watch the games on 9-by-12 foot LED screen outside of Mellon Arena. On October 18, Sidney Crosby scored one goal in addition to three assists to surpass benchmarks of 100 goals, 200 assists, and 300 total points for his career. In the same game, Evgeni Malkin assisted on four goals, giving him 200 total career points.

The Penguins received continued fan support from their previous season. In addition to extending a home sellout streak to 72 games on October 23, the Penguins ranked 113% above the national average for male television viewers aged 18 to 34. The franchise ranked as the 18th most valuable in the league at US$195 million, marking a 26% increase from the past season. According to Forbes, the franchise's revenue would likely put the Penguins into the top ten after their new arena, Consol Energy Center, opened in 2010. The Penguins finished October with a 3–1–1 record in Pittsburgh and concluded the month with three consecutive road losses.

=== November ===
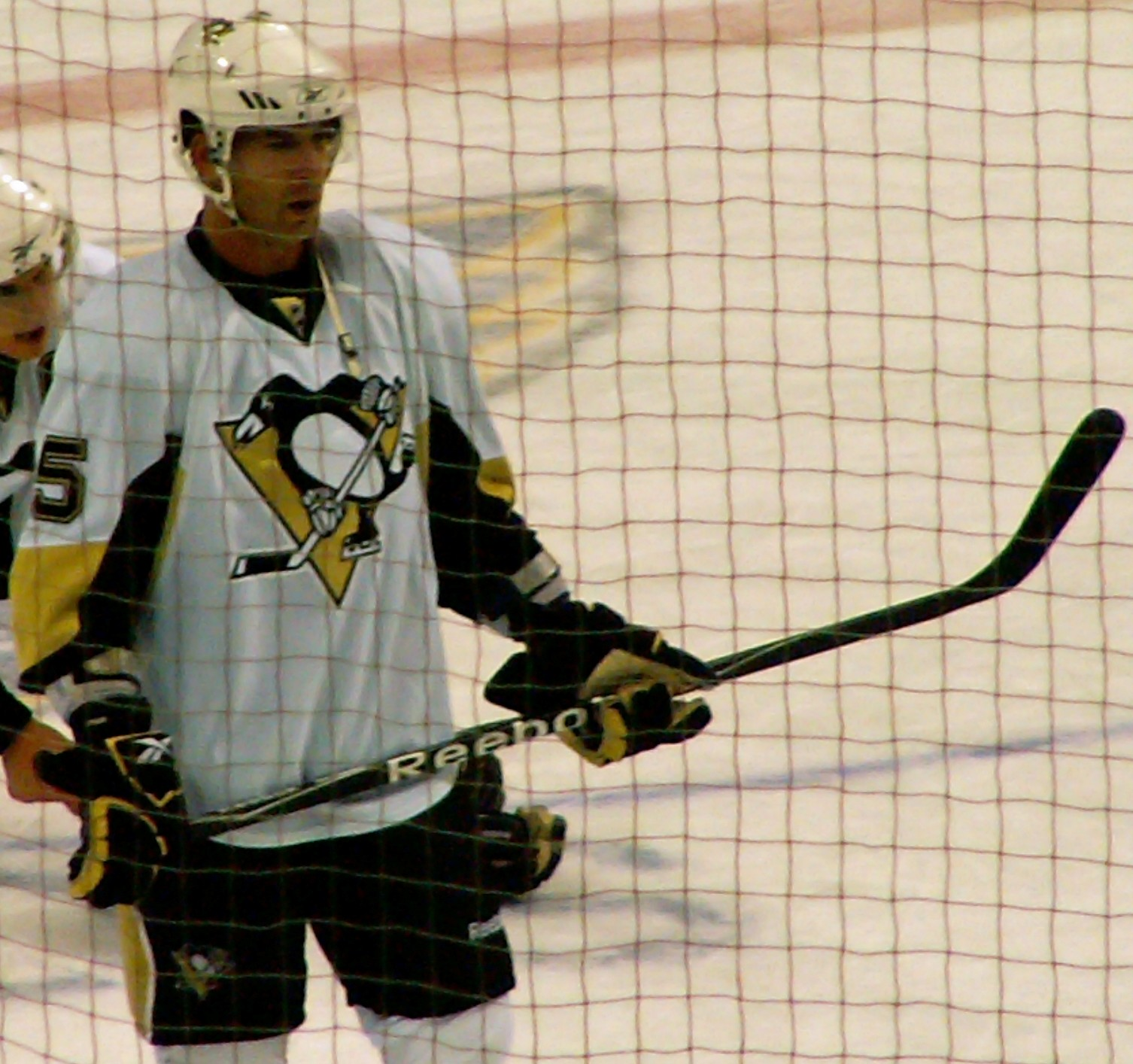
Mike Zigomanis led the NHL in face-off winning percentage through 20 games.

The Penguins won their first six games in November before losing in a shootout on November 18. Rob Scuderi and Hal Gill were selected by Therrien to be November's alternate captains, taking over for Brooks Orpik and Malkin who served in October. On November 11, the Penguins returned to Detroit for the first time since the 2008 Stanley Cup Final. The third goal of Jordan Staal's second career hat-trick came with 22.8 seconds remaining in regulation, sending the game into overtime where the Penguins achieved a 7–6 victory. Malkin's 13-game point streak ended on November 18, during the streak he scored 27 points. Through November 19, the Penguins led the league in overtime games with nine of 18 games taking extra time to decide. Through the first 20 games of the season, Mike Zigomanis led the league in faceoff percentage and Alex Goligoski led rookie defensemen in points. After an injury to Marc-Andre Fleury, Dany Sabourin and rookie John Curry split goaltending duties in his multi-game absence in which the team was 5–6–2. On November 26, Malkin scored three goals for his third career hat-trick, three days later Sidney Crosby also achieved a hat trick—the second of his career. After the team's final game of the month, Malkin and Crosby ranked first and second in league scoring with 39 and 34 points respectively. Malkin also ranked first in the league with 29 assists, and was named the NHL's second Star of the Month.

=== December ===
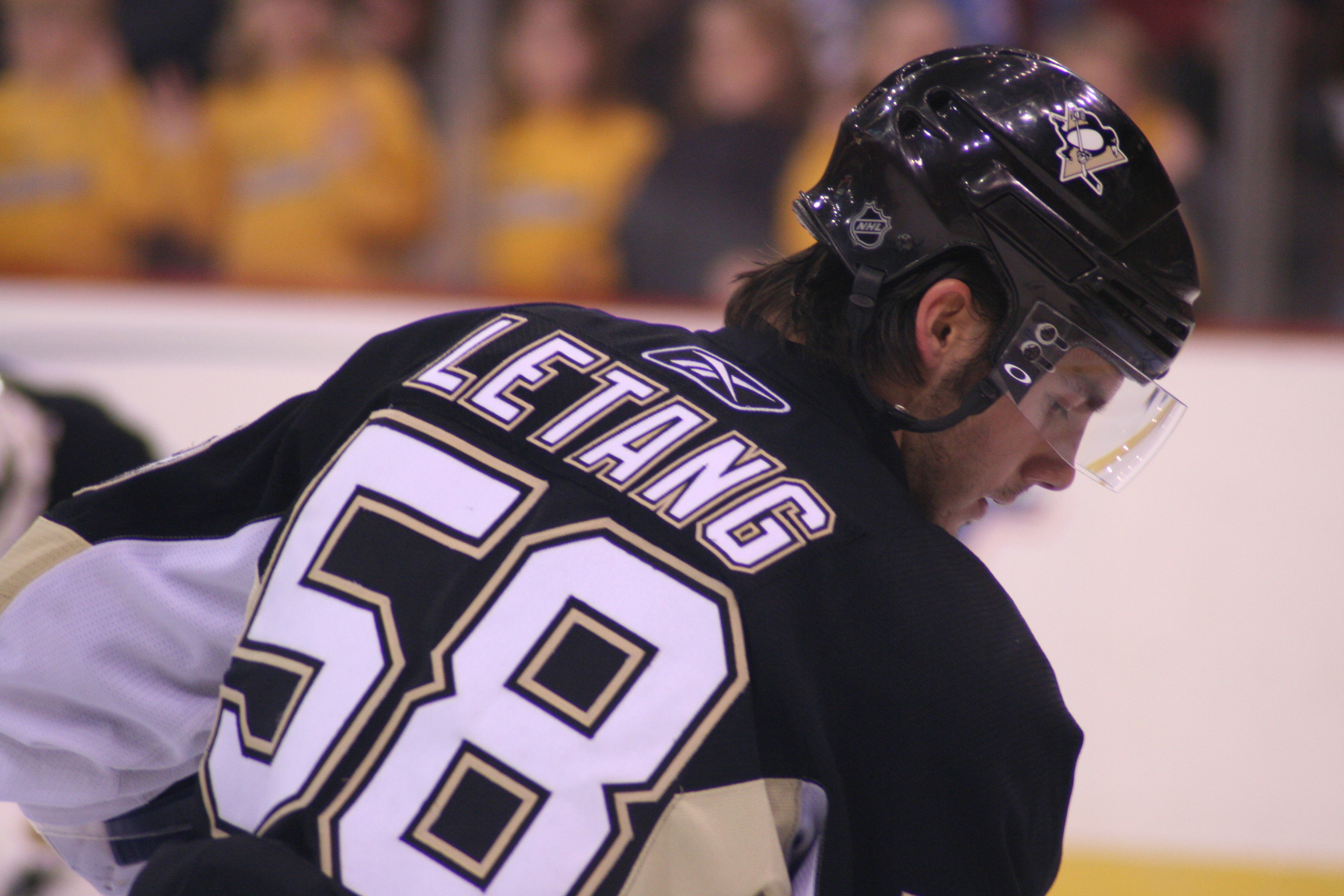
Kristopher Letang prior to a game

Therrien named Jordan Staal and Matt Cooke December's alternate captains. "I think it's important for our young group to try to extend the leadership group," the coach said of the decision. A survey by Turnkey Sports & Entertainment released on December 2 that surveyed fans of all 122 NFL, NBA, NHL and MLB teams ranked the Penguins eighth. The survey consisted of 21 categories such as entertainment value, commitment to winning, ticket value and likeability of the players and owners. Ranked 20th in the same poll in 2007, the Penguins were the second-ranked NHL team, behind the Detroit Red Wings. The Penguins began the month with seven games in eleven days in which they were 2–4–1. As of December 10, Crosby and Malkin continued to lead the league in points as well as leading voting for the All-Star Game in Montreal. On December 11, after losing three consecutive games, Petr Sykora and Pascal Dupuis each scored their first career hat-tricks in a 9–2 victory over the New York Islanders in Pittsburgh. It was the seventh time in the Penguins' history that two players scored a hat-trick in the same game, the first since 1993.

On December 21, Sidney Crosby surpassed the record for most All-Star Game votes at 1,020,736, set by Jaromir Jagr, then with the Penguins, in 2000. Crosby broke the record with 13 days remaining in voting. Defenceman Ryan Whitney made his first appearance of the season on December 23, after missing 33 games with a foot injury. On December 26, Marc-Andre Fleury made 37 saves in Pittsburgh's first shutout of the season, defeating the New Jersey Devils, 1–0. After concluding the month with a 5–8–1 record, the team held a players-only meeting on December 30. "The attitude is a little off right now," said Brooks Orpik, "It's easy to be a good team when you're winning games. When you're going through rough batches like this, it's what tests guys' character."

=== January ===
The Penguins began 2009 with three consecutive losses, extending their losing streak to five games—the most consecutive since 2006. During the streak, the Penguins fell from second to ninth place in the Eastern Conference and failed to score on 32 consecutive power plays.

Sidney Crosby and Evgeni Malkin led all players in voting for the 2009 All-Star Game. However, Crosby did not play due to a knee injury. The top vote-getter for the second year in a row, Crosby also missed the 2008 All-Star Game. On January 8, the team announced that they had agreed to a four-year contract extension with Jordan Staal worth $16 million. Staal's rookie contract was set to expire at the end of the season. He was the Penguins first round pick, second overall in 2006.

The team suffered from injuries, culminating in January where at one point they had eight starters injured. Mike Zigomanis had been inactive since December 3 and Ruslan Fedotenko was ruled out for four to six weeks after breaking his hand on January 6. Sergei Gonchar practiced with the team for the first time on January 16 after suffering a separated shoulder during the pre-season. By that time, the Penguins had lost 173 man-games due to injury, after losing 239 in the entire 2007–08 season. With a 3–0 victory over the New York Rangers on January 18, the Penguins won a second consecutive game for the first time since November 15. However, the team was unable to capitalize and lost their last game before the All-Star break to the Carolina Hurricanes. The Penguins entered the break with a 23–21–4 record. The team's 50 points put them in tenth place in the Eastern Conference, two spots out of the playoffs.

=== February ===
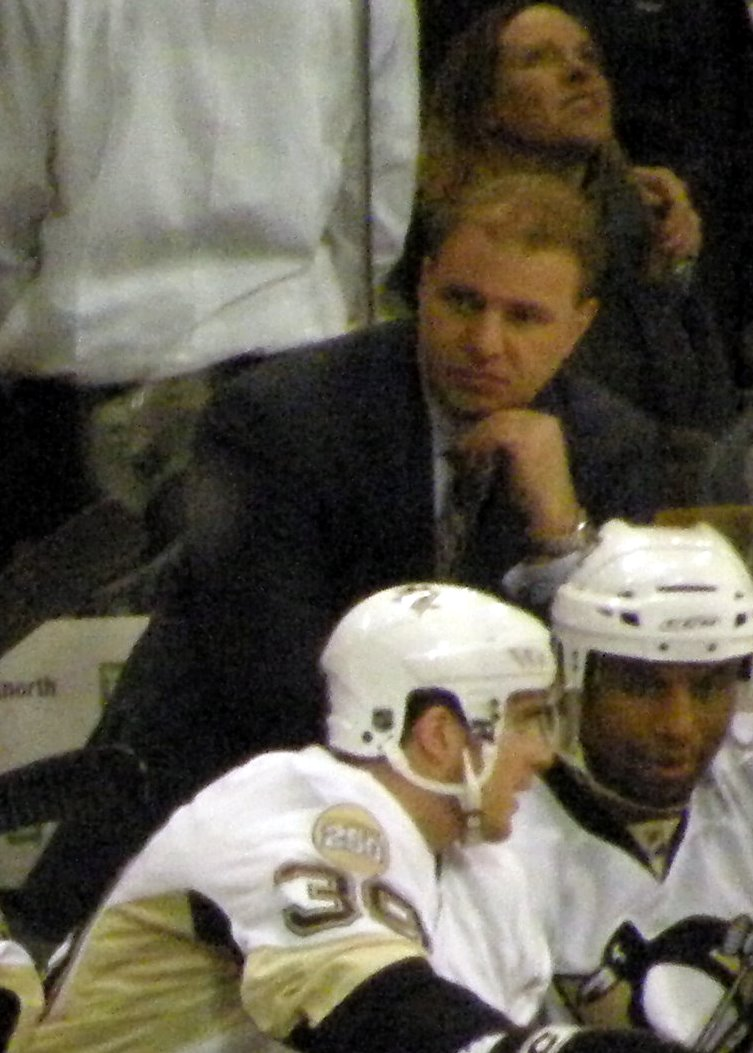
Michel Therrien, who was in his fourth season with the Penguins, was fired on February 15, 2009.

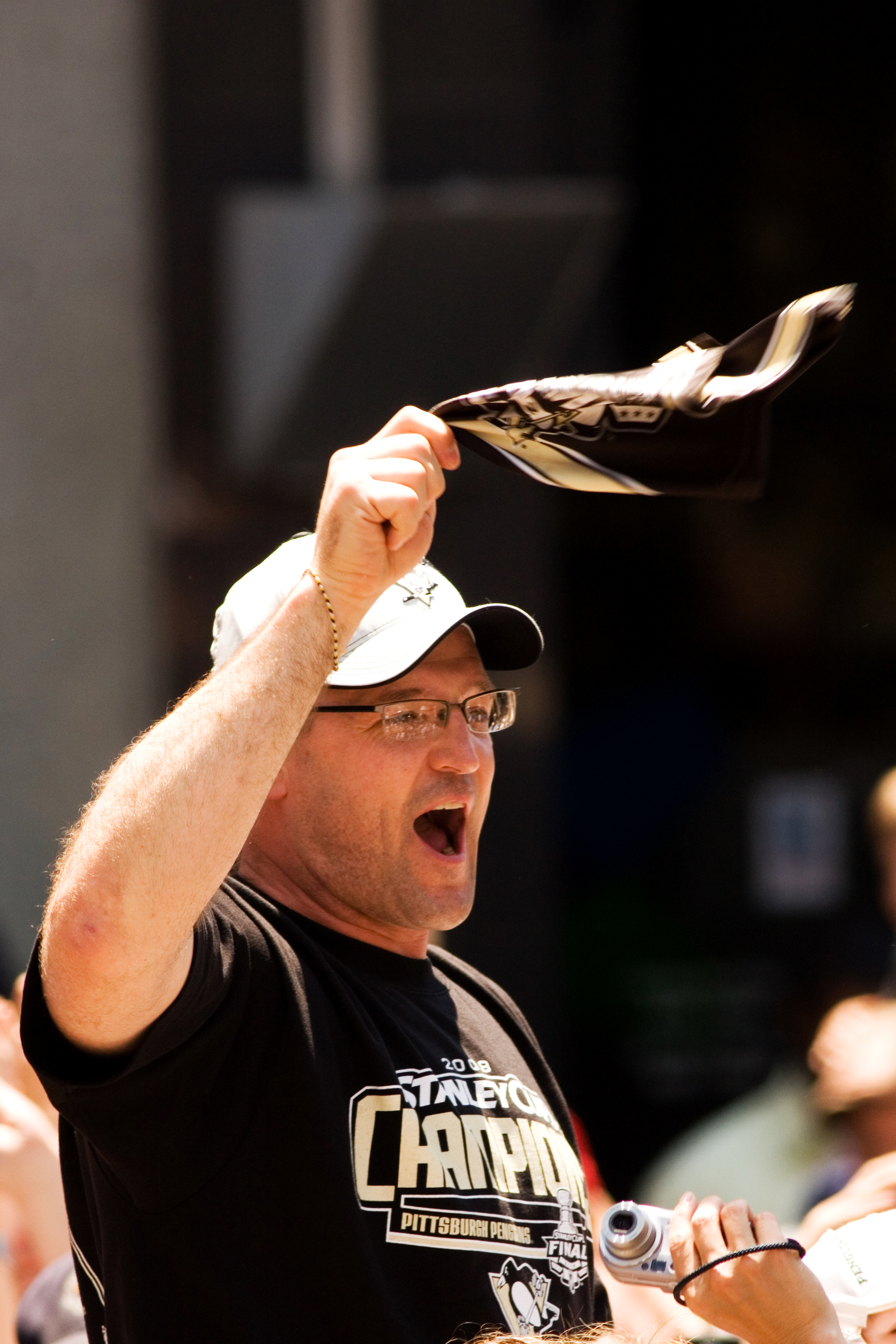
Dan Bylsma was promoted from the Penguins' AHL affiliate to replace Therrien.

On February 14, Sergei Gonchar made his season debut and Ruslan Fedotenko returned to the line-up after missing over a month due to a hand injury. On February 15—with the Penguins five points out of the playoffs—Therrien was replaced by Dan Bylsma, the coach of the Penguins' AHL affiliate Wilkes-Barre/Scranton, on an interim basis. Tom Fitzgerald was promoted from Director of Player Development to assistant coach for forwards, while Mike Yeo, already with the team, became assistant for the defensemen. Assistant Andre Savard was reassigned within the organization.

On February 21, Crosby recorded his 250th career assist in a 2-goal, 2-assist victory over the Philadelphia Flyers. On February 25, Fleury recorded his third shutout of the season, as the Penguins defeated the Islanders 1–0; the team remained two points out of the playoffs after the win. The day after the shutout, Ryan Whitney was traded to the Anaheim Ducks for Chris Kunitz and signing rights to prospect Eric Tangradi. In his first game after being traded to Pittsburgh, Kunitz recorded a goal and an assist as the Penguins defeated the Chicago Blackhawks in overtime.

=== March ===
The Penguins began March with five of six games on the road, before a homestand of eight consecutive games. Upon the Penguins' win on March 1, the team moved into eighth place in the Eastern Conference with 70 points. The NHL trade deadline was on March 4. On March 3, the Penguins placed Miroslav Satan on waivers to clear roster space for a trade. Before the deadline, the Penguins acquired New York Islanders' captain Bill Guerin in exchange for a conditional draft pick in the 2009 draft. The Penguins also exchanged minor league defensemen, sending Danny Richmond to the St. Louis Blues organization for Andy Wozniewski. They also claimed winger Craig Adams off waivers from the Chicago Blackhawks. Dan Bylsma surpassed Herb Brooks' record for the best record in his first ten games as a Penguins' coach. The team went a franchise-first 5–0–0 on a road trip at the beginning of March.

On March 15, the Penguins soldout their 100th consecutive game at the Mellon Arena. Evgeni Malkin recorded his 100th point of the season while tying a career-high five point game against the Atlanta Thrashers on March 17. On March 20, Vince Lascheid, Penguins and Pittsburgh Pirates organist of 33 years, died. Vice President of Communications Tom McMillan said, "[Lascheid] probably is the only organist in the history of professional sports to be inducted into a team Hall of Fame." The Penguins concluded March with eight consecutive games at the Mellon Arena—their longest homestand of the season.

=== April and season results ===
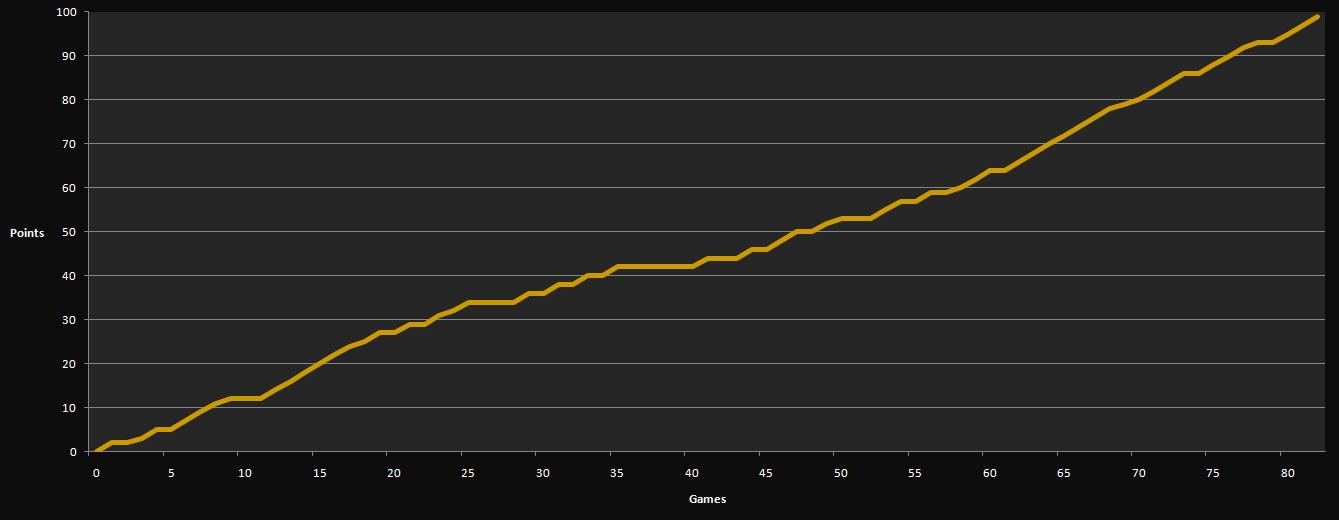
Graph of the Penguins point total

Pittsburgh finished their homestand with a 6–1–1 record, moving into fourth place in the Eastern Conference. The final game of the homestand was the most watched game of the season on FSN Pittsburgh, the Penguins regional television network. FSN Pittsburgh was the most-watched regional Fox network in the NHL for the second consecutive season. On April 7, Sidney Crosby scored his 100th point of the season, Evgeni Malkin acquired his 300th career point and Petr Sykora scored his 300th career goal, while the Penguins qualified for the post-season for the third consecutive season with a 6–4 win over the Tampa Bay Lightning. Tickets for Pittsburgh's first two opening round playoff games sold out within a few hours of going on sale. The team collected over $100,000 for the families of three Pittsburgh Police officers who were killed days before the game. The Penguins finished their regular season on April 12 with a win over the Montreal Canadiens. Through his first 25 games as Penguins' coach, Dan Blysma's 18–3–4 record amounted to 40 points—the second-most of any coach in NHL history through their first 25 games. The Penguins finished with a 45–28–9 record, for 99 points; fourth place in the Eastern Conference and second place in the Atlantic Division.

Evgeni Malkin won the Art Ross Trophy as the league's leading scorer with 113 points. Malkin followed Mario Lemieux, Jaromir Jagr and Crosby to become the fourth different Penguin to win the award. The award was the 13th overall for the Penguins since 1988.

=== Game log ===
2008–2009 Schedule
October: 5–4–2 (Home: 3–2–1; Road: 2–2–1), 12 Points

#	Oct	Time (ET)	Visitor	Score	Home	Location	Record	Points
1	4	2:30 PM	Pittsburgh Penguins	4–3 OT	Ottawa Senators	Ericsson Globe @ Stockholm, SWE (13,699)	1–0–0	2
2	5	2:30 PM	Ottawa Senators	3–1	Pittsburgh Penguins	Ericsson Globe @ Stockholm, SWE (13,699)	1–1–0	2
3	11	7:30 PM	New Jersey Devils	2–1 OT	Pittsburgh Penguins	Civic Arena (17,132)	1–1–1	3
4	14	7:30 PM	Philadelphia Flyers	2–3 OT	Pittsburgh Penguins	Civic Arena (16,965)	2–1–1	5
5	16	7:30 PM	Washington Capitals	4–3	Pittsburgh Penguins	Civic Arena (17,030)	2–2–1	5
6	18	7:00 PM	Toronto Maple Leafs	1–4	Pittsburgh Penguins	Civic Arena (17,033)	3–2–1	7
7	20	7:00 PM	Pittsburgh Penguins	2–1 SO	Boston Bruins	TD Garden (17,565)	4–2–1	9
8	23	7:30 PM	Carolina Hurricanes	1–4	Pittsburgh Penguins	Civic Arena (17,132)	5–2–1	11
9	25	7:00 PM	Pittsburgh Penguins	2–3 SO	New York Rangers	Madison Square Garden (IV) (18,200)	5–2–2	12
10	28	10:30 PM	Pittsburgh Penguins	1–2	San Jose Sharks	SAP Center at San Jose (17,496)	5–3–2	12
11	30	10:00 PM	Pittsburgh Penguins	1–4	Phoenix Coyotes	Gila River Arena (15,178)	5–4–2	12

November: 9–2–1 (Home: 4–1–1; Road: 5–1–0), 19 Points

#	Nov	Time (ET)	Visitor	Score	Home	Location	Record	Points
12	1	8:30 PM	Pittsburgh Penguins	6–3	St. Louis Blues	Scottrade Center (19,150)	6–4–2	14
13	6	7:00 PM	Edmonton Oilers	4–5	Pittsburgh Penguins	Civic Arena (16,971)	7–4–2	16
14	8	7:00 PM	Pittsburgh Penguins	4–3 SO	New York Islanders	Nassau Veterans Memorial Coliseum (14,303)	8–4–2	18
15	11	7:00 PM	Pittsburgh Penguins	7–6 OT	Detroit Red Wings	Joe Louis Arena (20,066)	9–4–2	20
16	13	7:30 PM	Philadelphia Flyers	4–5 SO	Pittsburgh Penguins	Civic Arena (17,132)	10–4–2	22
17	15	7:30 PM	Buffalo Sabres	2–5	Pittsburgh Penguins	Civic Arena (17,132)	11–4–2	24
18	18	7:00 PM	Minnesota Wild	2–1 SO	Pittsburgh Penguins	Civic Arena (16,971)	11–4–3	25
19	20	7:00 PM	Pittsburgh Penguins	3–2	Atlanta Thrashers	Philips Arena (13,391)	12–4–3	27
20	22	2:00 PM	Vancouver Canucks	3–1	Pittsburgh Penguins	Civic Arena (17,040)	12–5–3	27
21	26	7:00 PM	Pittsburgh Penguins	5–3	New York Islanders	Nassau Veterans Memorial Coliseum (14,871)	13–5–3	29
22	28	7:30 PM	Pittsburgh Penguins	3–4	Buffalo Sabres	First Niagara Center (18,690)	13–6–3	29
23	29	7:30 PM	New Jersey Devils	1–4	Pittsburgh Penguins	Civic Arena (17,132)	14–6–3	31

December: 5–8–1 (Home: 1–5–0; Road: 4–3–1), 11 Points

#	Dec	Time (ET)	Visitor	Score	Home	Location	Record	Points
24	3	7:00 PM	Pittsburgh Penguins	2–3 SO	New York Rangers	Madison Square Garden (IV) (18,200)	14–6–4	32
25	4	7:00 PM	Pittsburgh Penguins	5–2	Carolina Hurricanes	PNC Arena (14,559)	15–6–4	34
26	6	2:00 PM	Pittsburgh Penguins	2–3	Ottawa Senators	Canadian Tire Centre (19,561)	15–7–4	34
27	8	7:30 PM	Buffalo Sabres	4–3	Pittsburgh Penguins	Civic Arena (16,976)	15–8–4	34
28	10	7:00 PM	Pittsburgh Penguins	1–4	New Jersey Devils	Prudential Center (16,808)	15–9–4	34
29	11	7:30 PM	New York Islanders	2–9	Pittsburgh Penguins	Civic Arena (16,972)	16–9–4	36
30	13	1:00 PM	Pittsburgh Penguins	3–6	Philadelphia Flyers	Wells Fargo Center (19,811)	16–10–4	36
31	18	7:00 PM	Pittsburgh Penguins	6–3	Atlanta Thrashers	Philips Arena (15,124)	17–10–4	38
32	20	7:00 PM	Toronto Maple Leafs	7–3	Pittsburgh Penguins	Civic Arena (17,053)	17–11–4	38
33	22	7:00 PM	Pittsburgh Penguins	4–3 OT	Buffalo Sabres	First Niagara Center (18,690)	18–11–4	40
34	23	7:30 PM	Tampa Bay Lightning	2–0	Pittsburgh Penguins	Civic Arena (17,064)	18–12–4	40
35	26	7:00 PM	Pittsburgh Penguins	1–0	New Jersey Devils	Prudential Center (16,921)	19–12–4	42
36	27	7:00 PM	Montreal Canadiens	3–2	Pittsburgh Penguins	Civic Arena (17,132)	19–13–4	42
37	30	7:30 PM	Boston Bruins	5–2	Pittsburgh Penguins	Civic Arena (17,132)	19–14–4	42

January: 5–8–1 (Home: 4–3–0; Road: 1–5–1), 11 Points

#	Jan	Time (ET)	Visitor	Score	Home	Location	Record	Points
38	1	7:00 PM	Pittsburgh Penguins	2–4	Boston Bruins	TD Garden (17,565)	19–15–4	42
39	3	1:00 PM	Florida Panthers	6–1	Pittsburgh Penguins	Civic Arena (17,042)	19–16–4	42
40	5	7:00 PM	Pittsburgh Penguins	0–4	New York Rangers	Madison Square Garden (IV) (18,200)	19–17–4	42
41	6	7:30 PM	Atlanta Thrashers	1–3	Pittsburgh Penguins	Civic Arena (16,975)	20–17–4	44
42	8	8:00 PM	Pittsburgh Penguins	3–5	Nashville Predators	Bridgestone Arena (14,297)	20–18–4	44
43	10	3:00 PM	Pittsburgh Penguins	3–5	Colorado Avalanche	Pepsi Center (17,908)	20–19–4	44
44	13	7:00 PM	Pittsburgh Penguins	4–2	Philadelphia Flyers	Wells Fargo Center (19,872)	21–19–4	46
45	14	7:30 PM	Washington Capitals	6–3	Pittsburgh Penguins	Civic Arena (16,975)	21–20–4	46
46	16	7:30 PM	Anaheim Ducks	1–3	Pittsburgh Penguins	Civic Arena (17,005)	22–20–4	48
47	18	12:30 PM	New York Rangers	0–3	Pittsburgh Penguins	Civic Arena (17,024)	23–20–4	50
48	20	7:30 PM	Carolina Hurricanes	2–1	Pittsburgh Penguins	Civic Arena (16,972)	23–21–4	50
49	28	7:30 PM	New York Rangers	2–6	Pittsburgh Penguins	Civic Arena (16,965)	24–21–4	52
50	30	7:00 PM	Pittsburgh Penguins	3–4 OT	New Jersey Devils	Prudential Center (17,625)	24–21–5	53
51	31	7:00 PM	Pittsburgh Penguins	4–5	Toronto Maple Leafs	Air Canada Centre (19,570)	24–22–5	53

February: 7–4–1 (Home: 5–1–0; Road: 2–3–1), 15 Points

#	Feb	Time (ET)	Visitor	Score	Home	Location	Record	Points
52	3	7:30 PM	Pittsburgh Penguins	2–4	Montreal Canadiens	Bell Centre (21,273)	24–23–5	53
53	4	7:30 PM	Tampa Bay Lightning	3–4 OT	Pittsburgh Penguins	Civic Arena (16,977)	25–23–5	55
54	6	7:30 PM	Columbus Blue Jackets	1–4	Pittsburgh Penguins	Civic Arena (17,050)	26–23–5	57
55	8	12:30 PM	Detroit Red Wings	3–0	Pittsburgh Penguins	Civic Arena (17,132)	26–24–5	57
56	11	7:30 PM	San Jose Sharks	1–2 SO	Pittsburgh Penguins	Civic Arena (17,034)	27–24–5	59
57	14	7:00 PM	Pittsburgh Penguins	2–6	Toronto Maple Leafs	Air Canada Centre (19,365)	27–25–5	59
58	16	2:00 PM	Pittsburgh Penguins	2–3 SO	New York Islanders	Nassau Veterans Memorial Coliseum (16,234)	27–25–6	60
59	19	7:00 PM	Montreal Canadiens	4–5	Pittsburgh Penguins	Civic Arena (16,968)	28–25–6	62
60	21	1:00 PM	Pittsburgh Penguins	5–4	Philadelphia Flyers	Wells Fargo Center (19,992)	29–25–6	64
61	22	12:30 PM	Pittsburgh Penguins	2–5	Washington Capitals	Verizon Center (18,277)	29–26–6	64
62	25	7:30 PM	New York Islanders	0–1	Pittsburgh Penguins	Civic Arena (16,975)	30–26–6	66
63	27	8:30 PM	Pittsburgh Penguins	5–4 OT	Chicago Blackhawks	United Center (22,689)	31–26–6	68

March: 10–1–2 (Home: 6–1–1; Road: 4–0–1), 22 Points

#	Mar	Time (ET)	Visitor	Score	Home	Location	Record	Points
64	1	3:00 PM	Pittsburgh Penguins	4–1	Dallas Stars	American Airlines Center (18,532)	32–26–6	70
65	3	7:30 PM	Pittsburgh Penguins	3–1	Tampa Bay Lightning	Amalie Arena (19,908)	33–26–6	72
66	5	7:30 PM	Pittsburgh Penguins	4–1	Florida Panthers	BB&T Center (18,933)	34–26–6	74
67	8	3:00 PM	Pittsburgh Penguins	4–3 SO	Washington Capitals	Verizon Center (18,277)	35–26–6	76
68	10	7:30 PM	Florida Panthers	3–4 SO	Pittsburgh Penguins	Civic Arena (17,132)	36–26–6	78
69	12	7:00 PM	Pittsburgh Penguins	3–4 SO	Columbus Blue Jackets	Nationwide Arena (19,167)	36–26–7	79
70	14	3:00 PM	Ottawa Senators	4–3 SO	Pittsburgh Penguins	Civic Arena (17,132)	36–26–8	80
71	15	3:00 PM	Boston Bruins	4–6	Pittsburgh Penguins	Civic Arena (17,132)	37–26–8	82
72	17	7:30 PM	Atlanta Thrashers	2–6	Pittsburgh Penguins	Civic Arena (17,088)	38–26–8	84
73	20	7:30 PM	Los Angeles Kings	1–4	Pittsburgh Penguins	Civic Arena (17,132)	39–26–8	86
74	22	12:30 PM	Philadelphia Flyers	3–1	Pittsburgh Penguins	Civic Arena (17,132)	39–27–8	86
75	25	7:30 PM	Calgary Flames	0–2	Pittsburgh Penguins	Civic Arena (17,083)	40–27–8	88
76	28	1:00 PM	New York Rangers	3–4	Pittsburgh Penguins	Civic Arena (17,110)	41–27–8	90

April: 4–1–1 (Home: 2–0–0; Road: 2–1–1), 9 Points

#	Apr	Time (ET)	Visitor	Score	Home	Location	Record	Points
77	1	7:30 PM	New Jersey Devils	1–6	Pittsburgh Penguins	Civic Arena (17,132)	42–27–8	92
78	4	7:00 PM	Pittsburgh Penguins	2–3 OT	Carolina Hurricanes	PNC Arena (18,680)	42–27–9	93
79	5	5:00 PM	Pittsburgh Penguins	2–4	Florida Panthers	BB&T Center (18,232)	42–28–9	93
80	7	7:30 PM	Pittsburgh Penguins	6–4	Tampa Bay Lightning	Amalie Arena (19,538)	43–28–9	95
81	9	7:30 PM	New York Islanders	1–6	Pittsburgh Penguins	Civic Arena (17,132)	44–28–9	97
82	11	7:00 PM	Pittsburgh Penguins	3–1	Montreal Canadiens	Bell Centre (21,273)	45–28–9	99

Legend: = Win = Loss = OT/SO Loss

=== Standings ===
Divisional standings

Atlantic Division
		GP	W	L	OTL	GF	GA	Pts
**1**	**New Jersey Devils**	**82**	**51**	**27**	**4**	**244**	**209**	**106**
**2**	**Pittsburgh Penguins**	**82**	**45**	**28**	**9**	**264**	**239**	**99**
**3**	**Philadelphia Flyers**	**82**	**44**	**27**	**11**	**264**	**238**	**99**
**4**	**New York Rangers**	**82**	**43**	**30**	**9**	**210**	**218**	**95**
5	New York Islanders	82	26	47	9	201	279	61

Conference standings

Eastern Conference
R		Div	GP	W	L	OTL	GF	GA	Pts
**1**	**z – Boston Bruins**	**NE**	**82**	**53**	**19**	**10**	**274**	**196**	116
**2**	**y – Washington Capitals**	**SE**	**82**	**50**	**24**	**8**	**272**	**245**	108
**3**	**y – New Jersey Devils**	**AT**	**82**	**51**	**27**	**4**	**244**	**209**	106
**4**	**Pittsburgh Penguins**	**AT**	**82**	**45**	**28**	**9**	**264**	**239**	99
**5**	**Philadelphia Flyers**	**AT**	**82**	**44**	**27**	**11**	**264**	**238**	99
**6**	**Carolina Hurricanes**	**SE**	**82**	**45**	**30**	**7**	**239**	**226**	97
**7**	**New York Rangers**	**AT**	**82**	**43**	**30**	**9**	**210**	**218**	95
**8**	**Montreal Canadiens**	**NE**	**82**	**41**	**30**	**11**	**249**	**247**	93
8.5
9	Florida Panthers	SE	82	41	30	11	234	231	93
10	Buffalo Sabres	NE	82	41	32	9	250	234	91
11	Ottawa Senators	NE	82	36	35	11	217	237	83
12	Toronto Maple Leafs	NE	82	34	35	13	250	293	81
13	Atlanta Thrashers	SE	82	35	41	6	257	280	76
14	Tampa Bay Lightning	SE	82	24	40	18	210	279	66
15	New York Islanders	AT	82	26	47	9	201	279	61

bold – qualified for playoffs, y – division winner, z – placed first in conference (and division)

AT – Atlantic Division, NE – Northeast Division, SE – Southeast Division

=== Detailed records ===
Final

**Eastern Conference**
Atlantic	GP	W	L	OT	SHOTS	GF	GA	PP	PK	FO W–L
New Jersey Devils	6	3	1	2	148–216	16	12	4–25	1–26	149–161
New York Islanders	6	5	0	1	202–153	27	12	5–26	4–23	202–179
New York Rangers	6	3	1	2	171–193	17	15	2–31	3–23	148–168
Philadelphia Flyers	6	4	2	0	166–168	21	21	5–29	7–28	172–166
**Pittsburgh Penguins**										
Division Total	24	15	4	5	687–730	81	60	16–111	15–100	671–674

Northeast	GP	W	L	OT	SHOTS	GF	GA	PP	PK	FO W–L
Boston Bruins	4	2	2	0	132–127	12	14	2–19	5–23	108–136
Buffalo Sabres	4	2	2	0	109–119	15	13	4–22	3–18	130–120
Montreal Canadiens	4	2	2	0	128–111	12	12	1–16	1–10	97–112
Ottawa Senators	4	1	2	1	110–132	10	13	2–21	3–18	108–122
Toronto Maple Leafs	4	1	3	0	101–134	13	19	3–13	5–22	115–109
Division Total	20	8	11	1	580–623	62	71	12–91	17–91	558–599

Southeast	GP	W	L	OT	SHOTS	GF	GA	PP	PK	FO W–L
Atlanta Thrashers	4	4	0	0	111–102	18	8	8–20	3–20	115–121
Carolina Hurricanes	4	2	1	1	125–131	12	8	4–13	2–14	109–135
Florida Panthers	4	2	2	0	170–103	11	14	1–17	3–14	132–110
Tampa Bay Lightning	4	3	1	0	114–123	13	10	4–18	1–16	83–118
Washington Capitals	4	1	3	0	110–138	12	18	6–24	5–17	121–120
Division Total	20	12	7	1	630–597	66	58	23–92	14–81	560–604
Conference Total	64	35	22	7	1897–1950	209	189	51–294	46–272	1789–1877

**Western Conference**
Central	GP	W	L	OT	SHOTS	GF	GA	PP	PK	FO W–L
Chicago Blackhawks	1	1	0	0	28–45	5	4	1–4	3–7	27–34
Columbus Blue Jackets	2	1	0	1	66–62	7	5	2–5	1–11	61–67
Detroit Red Wings	2	1	1	0	59–63	7	9	1–9	4–8	54–66
Nashville Predators	1	0	1	0	25–35	3	5	0–3	1–3	36–37
St. Louis Blues	1	1	0	0	28–22	6	3	1–5	0–3	36–27
Division Total	7	4	2	1	206–227	28	26	5–26	9–32	214–231

Northwest	GP	W	L	OT	SHOTS	GF	GA	PP	PK	FO W–L
Calgary Flames	1	1	0	0	28–31	2	0	1–2	0–5	29–21
Colorado Avalanche	1	0	1	0	24–32	3	5	1–1	1–1	22–35
Edmonton Oilers	1	1	0	0	34–31	5	4	1–6	0–4	39–21
Minnesota Wild	1	0	0	1	25–25	1	2	0–4	0–2	32–24
Vancouver Canucks	1	0	1	0	19–19	1	3	0–4	0–2	28–24
Division Total	5	2	2	1	130–138	12	14	3–17	1–14	150–125

Pacific	GP	W	L	OT	SHOTS	GF	GA	PP	PK	FO W–L
Anaheim Ducks	1	1	0	0	24–22	3	1	0–3	1–4	26–20
Dallas Stars	1	1	0	0	23–21	4	1	1–6	1–6	30–27
Los Angeles Kings	1	1	0	0	26–25	4	1	1–4	1–8	21–31
Phoenix Coyotes	1	0	1	0	28–30	1	4	1–5	1–4	30–25
San Jose Sharks	2	1	1	0	47–71	3	3	0–5	0–7	50–59
Division Total	6	4	2	0	148–169	15	10	3–23	4–29	157–162
Conference Total	18	10	6	2	484–534	55	50	11–66	14–75	521–518
NHL Total	82	45	28	9	2381–2484	264	239	62–360	60–347	2310–2395

== Stanley Cup playoffs ==
The Penguins advanced to the Stanley Cup playoffs for the third consecutive season. They earned the fourth seed in the Eastern Conference and home-ice advantage in the opening round match-up against the Philadelphia Flyers, following a loss by the Flyers on the last day of the regular season. For the second consecutive season, the Penguins erected a 12 by 16 foot LED screen on the lawn directly outside Mellon Arena, allowing fans to watch all playoff games, free of charge. After defeating Philadelphia, the Penguins beat the Washington Capitals and the Carolina Hurricanes to advance to the Stanley Cup Final. The Penguins faced the Detroit Red Wings, defeating them in seven games to win their third Stanley Cup in franchise history. The final game of the season drew a 42.2 television rating in Pittsburgh—the highest local rating in any city since the NHL began to track the figure.

=== Eastern Conference Quarterfinals ===
The Penguins won Game 1 of the series 4–1, with goals from Sidney Crosby, Evgeni Malkin, Tyler Kennedy and defenseman Mark Eaton. "It was a good [night] for me," said Malkin, "It was a good [night] for everybody." Flyers head coach John Stevens was fined US$10,000 and forward Daniel Carcillo was suspended by the NHL for the second game of the series for a hit to Maxime Talbot's head immediately following a faceoff with seven seconds left in the game; Carcillo was not penalized at the time of the hit. In Game 2, Evgeni Malkin had a goal and an assist, while Marc-Andre Fleury made 38 saves. Bill Guerin scored two goals, including the game winner in overtime, and the Penguins won 3–2. With the Penguins up two games to zero, the series moved to Philadelphia for Game 3. After falling behind 2–0, goals from Malkin and Rob Scuderi tied the game. Malkin added his second goal of the game in the final period; however, Philadelphia won the game 6–3. In Game 4, Fleury stopped 45 shots, giving up one goal as the Penguins won 3–1. Crosby scored his second goal of the playoffs and Tyler Kennedy added the game winner. The Penguins were unable to clinch the series in Game 5 at Mellon Arena. A goal by Malkin was taken away after it was determined that he had kicked the puck into the net; Martin Biron stopped 28 shots for the shutout. Pittsburgh viewers were unable to see approximately 30 minutes of the second period after a lightning strike at a FSN Pittsburgh network facility in Atlanta caused the station to temporarily black out.

"I just thought Malkin and Crosby almost looked like they took the game over, to be honest with you. We capitalized on a few opportunities there, and if you get a 3–0 lead, it should be over."

— John Stevens, following the Penguins victory in game six.

In Game 6, the Flyers lead 3–0 four minutes into the second period. Maxime Talbot fought Daniel Carcillo after the Flyers tallied their third goal and the Penguins, re-energized by Talbot's display, scored three goals in what remained of the second period to tie the game 3–3. Sergei Gonchar scored his first goal of the series, his first in 23 playoff games dating back to game two of the Penguins' first-round series against Ottawa in 2008, to break the tie at 2:19 of the third period. Crosby added an empty-net goal and the Penguins eliminated the Flyers and advance to the Eastern Conference Semifinals. Three days after the Penguins series-clinching victory of the Flyers, the Penguins announced that Head Coach Dan Bylsma had signed a multi-year contract extension with the team.

=== Eastern Conference semi-finals ===
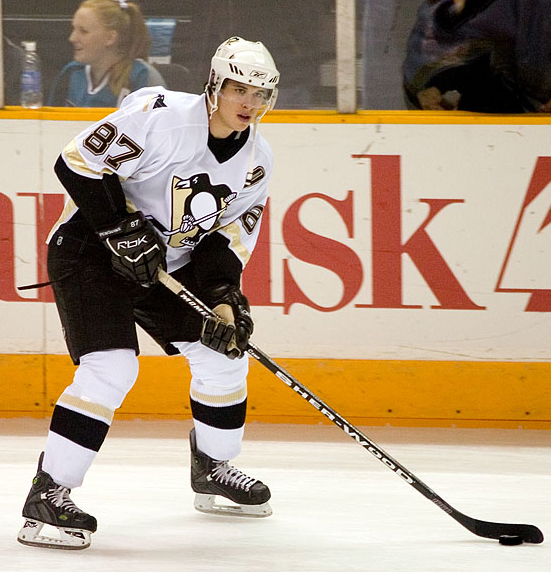
Sidney Crosby scored a hat-trick in Game 2 of the Conference Semifinals.

The Penguins drew a matchup with the Washington Capitals in the second round semi-finals. The anticipation for the series was high considering the rivalry between the teams and star players, most notably Sidney Crosby and Evgeni Malkin of the Penguins and Alexander Ovechkin and Alexander Semin of the Capitals. The first three games in the series were scheduled for national television in the U.S., with game one on NBC and games two and three on Versus.

Game 1 was held in Washington, where Capitals owner Ted Leonsis took steps to prevent Penguins' fans from purchasing tickets, such as not selling tickets to customers whose 724 or 412 area code indicated they were from Western Pennsylvania. Crosby scored to give the Penguins a first period lead, but Washington scored two goals before the conclusion of the period. Mark Eaton tied the game in the second period, but Washington's Semyon Varlamov held the Penguins scoreless for the remainder of the game as the Capitals took a 1–0 lead in the series. The game had 40% more viewers than playoff games the previous season. In Game 2, Ovechkin and Crosby scored three goals each, though Dave Steckel's second period goal was the difference as Washington won 4–3.

The series moved to Pittsburgh for Game 3 with the Penguins down 2–0. Goals from Ruslan Fedotenko, Nicklas Backstrom, Ovechkin and Malkin left the game tied after regulation. Kris Letang scored a powerplay goal 11 minutes into overtime, winning the game for the Penguins. Pittsburgh tied the series at two games apiece after a 5–3 Game 4 victory at Mellon Arena. After a Washington goal scored less than a minute into regulation, the Penguins responded with three goals in the first period. The Penguins' five goals came from five different players. During the first period, Sergei Gonchar was forced to leave the game after a knee-on-knee hit from Ovechkin; Gonchar returned to the Penguins' line-up for Game 7. Game 5 took place in Washington, D.C., the next day, due to the scheduling of a Yanni concert in Pittsburgh. After a scoreless first period, Washington took a 2–1 lead in the second. Fedotenko tied the game less than a minute into the third period, but a goal by Matt Cooke was matched by Ovechkin and the game went into overtime. With one second remaining in their second powerplay of the game, Malkin scored to give the Penguins their third consecutive victory. Game 6 was the third overtime game of the series. Washington forced a seventh game with a 5–4 victory. Nine different players scored goals in the game.

"I think everyone built the series up to end with a dramatic game seven, a huge story, and a big finish, but it didn’t feel anticlimactic to us."

— Dan Bylsma, speaking about the Penguins' 6–2 victory in game seven

In the final game of the series, Pittsburgh scored two goals within eight seconds of one another to take a 2–0 lead after Fleury stopped Ovechkin on a breakaway. Pittsburgh scored three more goals in the second period, extending their lead to 5–0, before Ovechkin scored his eighth goal of the series. Each team added a goal in the final period to end the game with a 6–2 final score. Ovechkin scored eight goals and added six assists in the series, while Crosby tallied eight goals and five assists. Crosby's 13-point tally in the series totalled one less than Ovechkin's 14 points, which was the highest single-series point total since the 1995 playoffs. While shaking hands following the final game, Crosby told Ovechkin he had played a "great series," to which Ovechkin responded, "win the Stanley Cup."

=== Eastern Conference Final ===
Pittsburgh faced the Carolina Hurricanes in the Eastern Conference Final, after Carolina defeated the Boston Bruins and New Jersey Devils. The series opened in Pittsburgh, where Miroslav Satan and Philippe Boucher scored their first goals of the playoffs. Marc-Andre Fleury was named the game's third star after making 23 saves and helping the Penguins to a 3–2 victory. In Game 2, Malkin scored a hat-trick and Chris Kunitz scored his first goal of the playoffs as the Penguins won 7–4, taking a two games to none series lead. In Game 3, Malkin scored two goals and Crosby scored one as the Penguins took a 3–1 lead into the first intermission. After a scoreless second period, the Hurricanes came within a goal after Sergei Samsonov scored less than two minutes into the final period, but goals by Fedotenko, Craig Adams and Guerin gave the Penguins a 6–2 victory. The series concluded with the Penguins sweeping, four games to none. In the series' fourth game, Pittsburgh gave up the initial goal less than two minutes into the opening period, but goals from Fedotenko and Talbot gave them the lead after the first period. A second period goal from Guerin and an empty netter from Adams sealed the Penguins' victory in the game and the series.

Following Game 4, Crosby hoisted the Prince of Wales Trophy after refusing to touch it the previous season. As team captain, Mario Lemieux hoisted the Prince of Wales Trophy in 1991 and 1992, and the Penguins won the Stanley Cup each time.

=== Stanley Cup Final ===
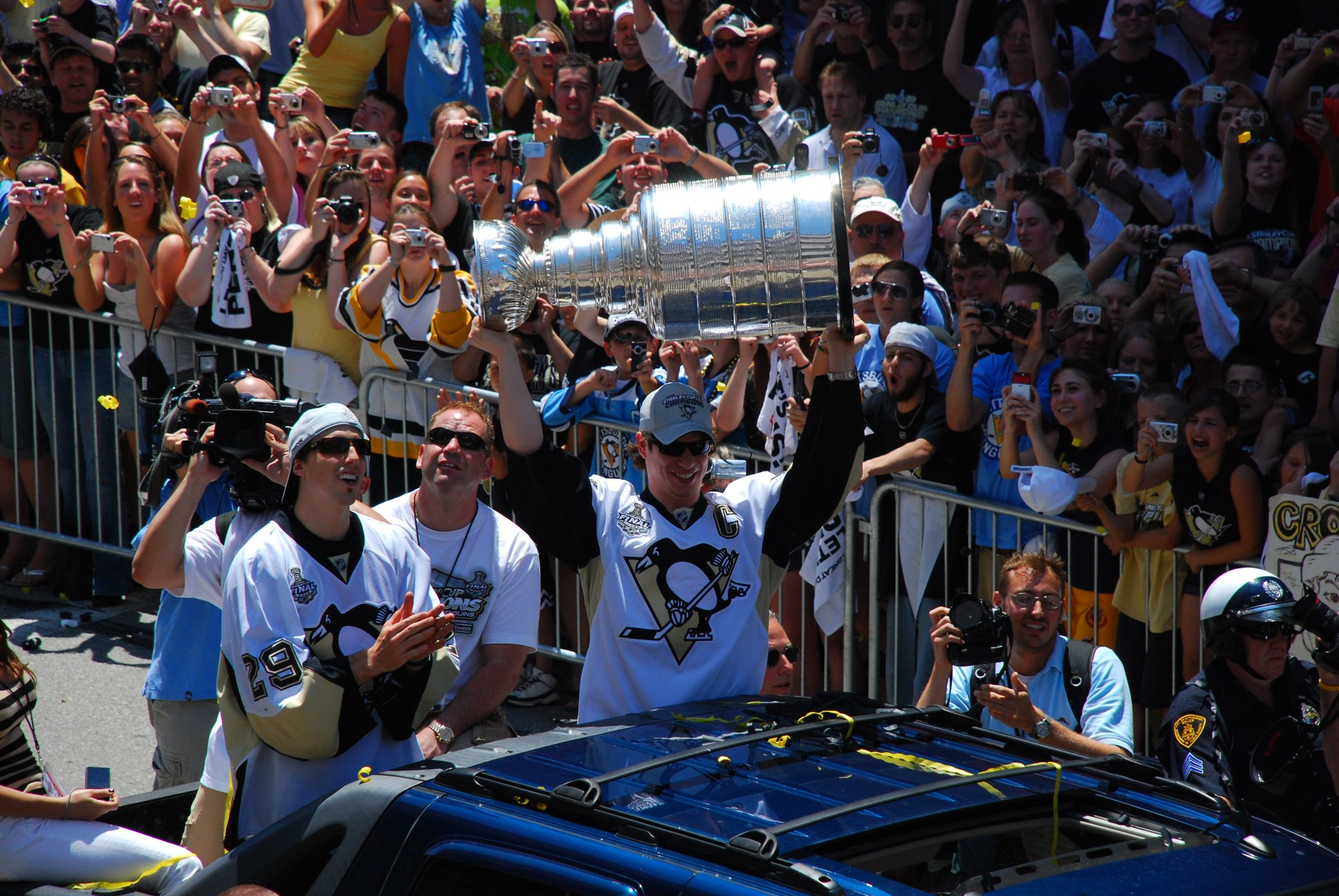
Sidney Crosby holds the Stanley Cup at a parade in Pittsburgh.

For the second consecutive season, the Penguins played the Detroit Red Wings in the Stanley Cup Final, marking the first time in 25 years that two teams played each other in consecutive Finals. Tickets for Games 3 and 4, which were hosted at Mellon Arena, sold out in 10 minutes. In the first game of the series, the Red Wings scored the first goal when a puck shot by Brad Stuart ricocheted off the boards behind the goal, then bounced off Marc-Andre Fleury and into the net. Ruslan Fedotenko, with an assist from Evgeni Malkin, tied the game before the conclusion of the first period. Detroit went on to score a goal in each of the final two periods to win Game 1, 3–1. Evgeni Malkin scored a powerplay goal in the first period of game two, but the Penguins were held scoreless for the remainder of the contest; falling 3–1 for a second consecutive game.

With the Penguins down two games to none, the series shifted to Pittsburgh for Game 3. After a 2–2 first period and a scoreless second period, Sergei Gonchar and Maxime Talbot each scored a goal in the third period to give the Penguins a 4–2 victory. In Game 4, the Penguins tied the Red Wings at two games apiece with three unanswered goals in the second period, including a shorthanded goal by Jordan Staal. With the series returning to Detroit, the Red Wings took a three games to two lead in the series with a 5–0 win. Staal and Tyler Kennedy scored as the Penguins tied the series at three games apiece in a 2–1 game six victory. In the seventh and final game of the series, Maxime Talbot scored two goals and Fleury made 23 saves as the Penguins won their third Stanley Cup in franchise history.

Evgeni Malkin won the Conn Smythe Trophy as the MVP of the playoffs. Fans celebrated in the streets of Pittsburgh after the game, with the Stanley Cup victory coming four months after the Pittsburgh Steelers' victory in Super Bowl XLIII. Two days after the victory, 375,000 people attended a parade of the Cup through downtown Pittsburgh.

=== Playoff log ===
2009 Stanley Cup Playoffs
Eastern Conference quarterfinals vs No. 5 Philadelphia Flyers: 4–2 (Home: 2–1; Road: 2–1)

#	Date	Visitor	Score	Home	OT	PIT goals	PHI goals	Decision	Attendance	Series	Recap
1	April 15	Philadelphia	1–4	Pittsburgh		Crosby, Kennedy, Malkin, Eaton	Gagne	Fleury (1–0)	17,132	1–0	
2	April 17	Philadelphia	2–3	Pittsburgh	18:29	Malkin, Guerin, Guerin (OT)	Hartnell, Powe	Fleury (2–0)	17,132	2–0	
3	April 19	Pittsburgh	3–6	Philadelphia		Malkin, Scuderi, Malkin	Carter, Richards, Giroux, Gagne, Ross, Gagne (en)	Fleury (2–1)	19,745	2–1	
4	April 21	Pittsburgh	3–1	Philadelphia		Crosby, Kennedy, Talbot (en)	Carcillo	Fleury (3–1)	19,745	3–1	
5	April 23	Philadelphia	3–0	Pittsburgh			Asham, Giroux, Knuble	Fleury (3–2)	17,132	3–2	
6	April 25	Pittsburgh	5–3	Philadelphia		Fedotenko, Eaton, Crosby, Gonchar, Crosby (en)	Knuble, Lupul, Briere	Fleury (4–2)	20,072	4–2	

Eastern Conference semi-finals vs No. 2 Washington Capitals: 4–3 (Home: 2–1; Road: 2–2)

#	Date	Visitor	Score	Home	OT	PIT goals	WSH goals	Decision	Attendance	Series	Recap
1	May 2	Pittsburgh	2–3	Washington		Crosby, Eaton	Steckel, Ovechkin, Fleischmann	Fleury (4–3)	18,277	0–1	
2	May 4	Pittsburgh	3–4	Washington		Crosby (3)	Ovechkin, Steckel, Ovechkin (2)	Fleury (4–4)	18,277	0–2	
3	May 6	Washington	2–3	Pittsburgh	11:23	Fedotenko, Malkin, Letang	Ovechkin, Backstrom	Fleury (5–4)	17,132	1–2	
4	May 8	Washington	3–5	Pittsburgh		Gonchar, Guerin, Fedotenko, Crosby, Talbot	Backstrom, Clark, Jurcina	Fleury (6–4)	17,132	2–2	
5	May 9	Pittsburgh	4–3	Washington	3:28	Staal, Fedotenko, Cooke, Malkin	Ovechkin, Backstrom, Ovechkin	Fleury (7–4)	18,277	3–2	
6	May 11	Washington	5–4	Pittsburgh	6:22	Guerin, Eaton, Letang, Crosby	Kozlov, Fleischmann, Laich, Kozlov, Steckel	Fleury (7–5)	17,132	3–3	
7	May 13	Pittsburgh	6–2	Washington		Crosby, Adams, Guerin, Letang, Staal, Crosby	Ovechkin, Laich	Fleury (8–5)	18,277	4–3	

Eastern Conference finals vs No. 6 Carolina Hurricanes: 4–0 (Home: 2–0; Road: 2–0)

#	Date	Visitor	Score	Home	OT	PIT goals	CAR goals	Decision	Attendance	Series	Recap
1	May 18	Carolina	2–3	Pittsburgh		Satan, Malkin, Boucher	LaRose, Corvo	Fleury (9–5)	17,132	1–0	
2	May 21	Carolina	4–7	Pittsburgh		Crosby, Malkin, Talbot, Kunitz, Malkin 2, Kennedy	Larose, Jokinen, Seidenberg, Eaves	Fleury (10–5)	17,132	2–0	
3	May 23	Pittsburgh	6–2	Carolina		Malkin, Crosby, Malkin 2, Fedotenko, Adams, Guerin	Cullen, Samsonov	Fleury (11–5)	18,789	3–0	
4	May 26	Pittsburgh	4–1	Carolina		Fedotenko, Talbot, Guerin, Adams	Staal	Fleury (12–5)	18,680	4–0	

Stanley Cup Finals vs No. 2 Detroit Red Wings: 4–3 (Home: 3–0; Road: 1–3)

#	Date	Visitor	Score	Home	OT	PIT goals	DET goals	Decision	Attendance	Series	Recap
1	May 30	Pittsburgh	1–3	Detroit		Fedotenko	Stuart, Franzen, Abdelkader	Fleury (12–6)	20,066	0–1	
2	May 31	Pittsburgh	1–3	Detroit		Malkin	Ericsson, Filppula, Abdelkader	Fleury (12–7)	20,066	0–2	
3	June 2	Detroit	2–4	Pittsburgh		Talbot, Letang, Gonchar, Talbot	Zetterberg, Franzen	Fleury (13–7)	17,132	1–2	
4	June 4	Detroit	2–4	Pittsburgh		Malkin, Staal, Crosby, Kennedy	Helm, Stuart	Fleury (14–7)	17,132	2–2	
5	June 6	Pittsburgh	0–5	Detroit			Cleary, Filppula, Kronwall, Rafalski, Zetterberg	Fleury (14–8)	20,066	2–3	
6	June 9	Detroit	1–2	Pittsburgh		Staal, Kennedy	Draper	Fleury (15–8)	17,132	3–3	
7	June 12	Pittsburgh	2–1	Detroit		Talbot (2)	Ericsson	Fleury (16–8)	20,066	4–3	

Legend: = Win = Loss = Playoff series win

- Scorer of game-winning goal in italics

== Player statistics ==
Skaters

Regular season
Player	GP	G	A	Pts	+/−	PIM
Evgeni Malkin	82	35	78	113	17	80
Sidney Crosby	77	33	70	103	3	76
Jordan Staal	82	22	27	49	5	37
Petr Sykora	76	25	21	46	3	36
Ruslan Fedotenko	65	16	23	39	18	44
Miroslav Satan	65	17	19	36	3	36
Tyler Kennedy	67	15	20	35	15	30
Kris Letang	74	10	23	33	-7	24
Matt Cooke	76	13	18	31	0	101
Pascal Dupuis	71	12	16	28	1	30
Max Talbot	75	12	10	22	-9	63
Alex Goligoski	45	6	14	20	5	16
Sergei Gonchar	25	6	13	19	6	26
Brooks Orpik	79	2	17	19	10	73
Chris Kunitz^{†}	20	7	11	18	3	16
Rob Scuderi	81	1	15	16	23	18
Ryan Whitney^{‡}	28	2	11	13	-15	16
Bill Guerin^{†}	17	5	7	12	3	18
Hal Gill	62	2	8	10	11	53
Mark Eaton	68	4	5	9	3	36
Philippe Boucher^{†}	25	3	3	6	10	24
Mike Zigomanis	22	2	4	6	-2	27
Eric Godard	71	2	2	4	-3	171
Bill Thomas	16	2	1	3	-4	2
Chris Minard	20	1	2	3	0	4
Dustin Jeffrey	14	1	2	3	4	0
Darryl Sydor^{‡}	8	1	1	2	5	2
Jeff Taffe	8	0	2	2	-4	2
Tim Wallace	16	0	2	2	2	7
Luca Caputi	5	1	0	1	-1	4
Craig Adams^{†}	9	0	1	1	0	0
Paul Bissonnette	15	0	1	1	-1	22
Connor James	1	0	0	0	0	0
Ryan Stone	2	0	0	0	1	2
Janne Pesonen	7	0	0	0	-3	0
Ben Lovejoy	2	0	0	0	0	0
Total		258	447	705	—	1,096

Playoffs
Player	GP	G	A	Pts	+/−	PIM
Evgeni Malkin	24	14	22	36	3	51
Sidney Crosby	24	15	16	31	9	14
Bill Guerin	24	7	8	15	8	15
Ruslan Fedotenko	24	7	7	14	9	4
Sergei Gonchar	22	3	11	14	3	12
Chris Kunitz	24	1	13	14	3	19
Max Talbot	24	8	5	13	8	19
Kris Letang	23	4	9	13	1	26
Tyler Kennedy	24	5	4	9	-1	4
Jordan Staal	24	4	5	9	-5	8
Mark Eaton	24	4	3	7	4	10
Matt Cooke	24	1	6	7	-2	22
Miroslav Satan	17	1	5	6	1	11
Craig Adams	24	3	2	5	-1	16
Rob Scuderi	24	1	4	5	5	6
Philippe Boucher	9	1	3	4	-2	4
Brooks Orpik	24	0	4	4	-1	22
Hal Gill	24	0	2	2	8	6
Petr Sykora	7	0	1	1	-3	0
Alex Goligoski	2	0	1	1	-1	0
Pascal Dupuis	16	0	0	0	-5	8
Total		79	131	210	—	277

Goaltenders

Regular season
Player	GP	GS	TOI	W	L	OT	GA	GAA	SA	SV%	SO	G	A	PIM
Marc-Andre Fleury	62	61	3640:59	35	18	7	162	2.67	1850	0.912	4	0	1	8
Dany Sabourin	19	16	989:26	6	8	2	47	2.85	463	0.898	0	0	0	2
John Curry	3	2	149:45	2	1	0	6	2.40	69	0.913	0	0	0	0
Mathieu Garon^{†}	4	3	205:53	2	1	0	10	2.91	94	0.894	0	0	0	0
Total		82	4986:03	45	28	9	225	2.71	2476	0.909	4	0	1	10

Playoffs
Player	GP	GS	TOI	W	L	OT	GA	GAA	SA	SV%	SO	G	A	PIM
Marc-Andre Fleury	24	24	1447:18	16	8	--	63	2.61	686	0.908	0	0	0	2
Mathieu Garon	1	0	24:20	0	0	--	0	0.00	8	1.000	0	0	0	0
Total		24	1471:38	16	8	0	63	2.57	694	0.909	0	0	0	2

^{†}Denotes player spent time with another team before joining the Penguins. Stats reflect time with the Penguins only.
^{‡}Denotes player was traded mid-season. Stats reflect time with the Penguins only.

== Awards and records ==
=== Records ===
Regular season
Player	Milestone	Reached
J. Staal	Youngest player to play 200 games	December 30, 2008

=== Milestones ===
Regular season
Player	Milestone	Reached
Alex Goligoski	1st career goal	October 5, 2008
Sidney Crosby	100th career goal 200th career assist 300th career point	October 18, 2008
Evgeni Malkin	100th career goal	October 18, 2008
Dustin Jeffrey	1st career goal	January 1, 2009
Evgeni Malkin	200th career point	January 30, 2009
Luca Caputi	1st career goal	February 3, 2009
Miroslav Satan	1000th career game	February 4, 2009
Marc-Andre Fleury	100th career win	March 1, 2009
Bill Guerin	800th career point	March 5, 2009
Petr Sykora	300th career goal	April 7, 2009

Players who made their NHL debut
Player	Notes
Paul Bissonnette	2003 fourth round pick
John Curry	2007 undrafted free agent
Dustin Jeffrey	2007 sixth round pick
Ben Lovejoy	2008 free agent
Janne Pesonen	2008 free agent
Luca Caputi	2007 fourth round pick
Tim Wallace	2006 undrafted free agent

=== Awards ===
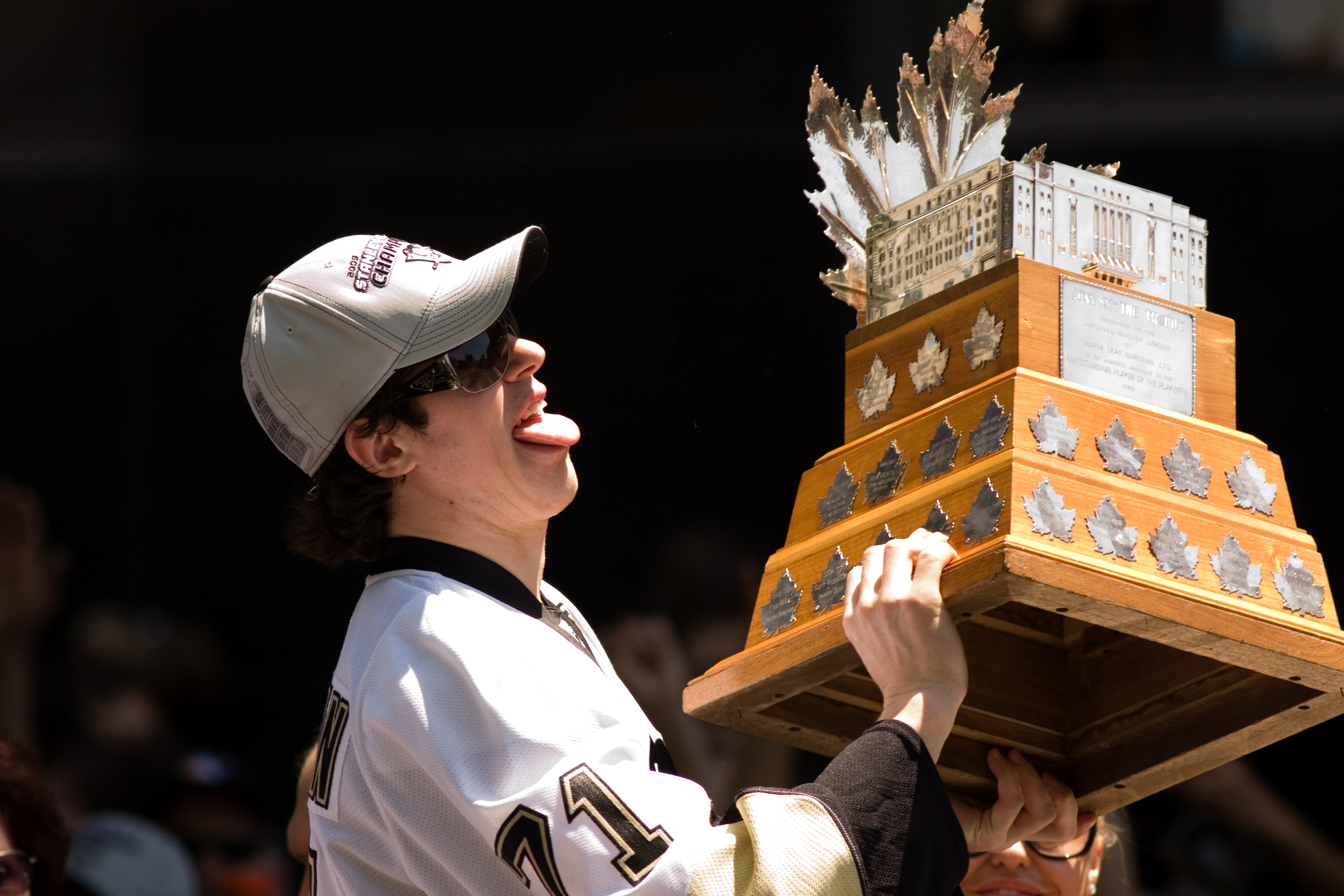
Evgeni Malkin won the Conn Smythe Trophy as the most valuable player of the playoffs.

Player	Award
Sidney Crosby; Evgeni Malkin	All-Star starting forwards
Kris Letang	YoungStars sophomore defenceman
Mark Eaton	Bill Masterton Memorial Trophy finalist
Evgeni Malkin	Art Ross Trophy (113 points); Hart Memorial Trophy finalist Lester B. Pearson Award finalist Conn Smythe Trophy
Sidney Crosby	Mark Messier Leadership Award finalist

Prior to the team's final home game on April 9 against the New York Islanders, the team announced its annual award winners. Awards were given by the Pittsburgh chapter of the Professional Hockey Writers Association, the Penguins Booster Club, as well as voted amongst the team.

Player	Award	Notes
Sidney Crosby; Brooks Orpik	Baz Bastien Memorial Award	Awarded by the Writers Association for cooperation throughout the season. Sponsor: UPMC Sports Medicine
Mark Eaton	Bill Masterton Memorial Trophy nominee	Nominated by the Writers Association for league-wide recognition. Sponsor: Trib Total Media
Evgeni Malkin	A. T. Caggiano Memorial Booster Club Cup	Awarded to the player with the most "three stars" recognitions.
Eric Godard	Edward J. DeBartolo Award	Awarded for time and effort towards community and charity projects. Sponsor: Verizon Wireless
Jordan Staal	Defensive Player of the Year	Sponsor: CONSOL Energy
Eric Godard	Player's Player Award	Voted by the team for leadership and teamwork. Sponsor: Highmark Blue Cross Blue Shield
Evgeni Malkin	Most Valuable Player	Sponsor:BNY Mellon

== Transactions ==
Concerns over future player contracts were raised just days after the 2008 Stanley Cup Final. Approximately a dozen players, including Marian Hossa, Jarkko Ruutu, Ryan Malone and Brooks Orpik, had fulfilled the final year on their contracts. On June 28, the Penguins traded the contract negotiation rights to Gary Roberts and Ryan Malone to the Tampa Bay Lightning for a conditional draft pick; it became a third-round pick when both Malone and Roberts signed with the Lightning on June 30. Evgeni Malkin was offered a contract from a Russian team in the newly formed Kontinental Hockey League (KHL) worth approximately $12.5 million, tax exempt, per year, which would make him the highest-paid hockey player in the world. However, Malkin turned down the offer to remain with the Penguins, and the IIHF released a statement saying that it would not honor the offer, as Malkin was already under an existing contract with the Penguins at the time. Malkin agreed to a five-year contract extension worth $8.7 million per year—the same value as Sidney Crosby's contract—with the Penguins on July 2. On July 3, the Penguins agreed to a seven-year deal with restricted free agent goaltender Marc-Andre Fleury in addition to one-year contracts with free agents Miroslav Satan and Ruslan Fedotenko. On October 8, the Penguins made several roster adjustments, placing Kris Beech, who was already in Europe looking for a new team, on unconditional waivers and sending Janne Pesonen, John Curry and Jeff Taffe, who first had to clear waivers, to Wilkes-Barre/Scranton. The next day, on October 9, the Penguins acquired Michael Zigomanis from Phoenix for future considerations. On December 19, the team extended their agreement with Maxime Talbot for an additional two seasons.

Trades

June 28, 2008	To Tampa Bay Lightning Gary Roberts (Note: Trade of negotiating rights to); Ryan Malone (Note: Trade of negotiating rights to.)	To Pittsburgh Penguins Conditional 3rd- or 4th-round pick in 2009 (Note: 4th-round pick would convert to 3rd-round pick if both players signed new contracts with Tampa Bay.)
July 17, 2008	To Chicago Blackhawks Tim Brent	To Pittsburgh Penguins Danny Richmond
October 1, 2008	To Tampa Bay Lightning Michal Sersen	To Pittsburgh Penguins 5th-round pick in 2009
October 9, 2008	To Phoenix Coyotes Future considerations	To Pittsburgh Penguins Michael Zigomanis
November 16, 2008	To Dallas Stars Darryl Sydor	To Pittsburgh Penguins Philippe Boucher
December 19, 2008	To St. Louis Blues Jonathan Filewich	To Pittsburgh Penguins 6th-round pick in 2010
January 5, 2009	To Montreal Canadiens T. J. Kemp	To Pittsburgh Penguins Conditional 7th-round pick in 2010 (Note: Condition not satisfied.)
January 17, 2009	To Edmonton Oilers Dany Sabourin; Ryan Stone; 4th-round pick in 2011	To Pittsburgh Penguins Mathieu Garon
February 26, 2009	To Anaheim Ducks Ryan Whitney	To Pittsburgh Penguins Chris Kunitz; Eric Tangradi
March 4, 2009	To St. Louis Blues Danny Richmond	To Pittsburgh Penguins Andy Wozniewski
March 4, 2009	To New York Islanders Conditional pick in 2009 (Note: Initially fifth-round pick, fourth-round pick if Penguins make playoffs, third-round pick if Penguins win a playoff round and Guerin plays in 50% of the games.)	To Pittsburgh Penguins Bill Guerin

Free agents signed by Pittsburgh

Player	Former team	Contract Terms
Eric Godard	Calgary Flames	3 years
Miroslav Satan	New York Islanders	1 year, $3.5 million
Ruslan Fedotenko	New York Islanders	1 year, $2.5 million
Matt Cooke	Washington Capitals	2 years, $2.4 million
Janne Pesonen	Karpat (SM-liiga)	1 year
Adam Henrich	Norfolk Admirals (AHL)	1 year
T. J. Kemp	Springfield Falcons (AHL)	1 year
Joey Mormina	Carolina Hurricanes	1 year
Bill Thomas	Phoenix Coyotes	1 year
Joey Haddad	Undrafted free agent	3 years

Signed with new team

Player	New team	Contract Terms
Ty Conklin	Detroit Red Wings	1 year, $750,000
Marian Hossa	Detroit Red Wings	1 year, $7.45 million
Jarkko Ruutu	Ottawa Senators	3 years, $3.9 million
Georges Laraque	Montreal Canadiens	3 years, $4.5 million
Kurtis McLean	New York Islanders	1 year
Nathan Smith	Colorado Avalanche	Terms unknown
Alain Nasreddine	Sinupret Ice Tigers (DEL)	2 years
Ryan Lannon	Phoenix Coyotes	1 year

Claimed from waivers

Date	Player	Previous team
March 4, 2009	Craig Adams	Chicago Blackhawks

== Draft picks ==
The 2008 NHL entry draft was held on June 20–21, 2008, in Ottawa, Ontario. The Penguins did not make their first selection until the fourth round, at 120th overall.

Round	#	Player	Pos	Nationality	College/Junior/Club team (League)
4	120	Nathan Moon	Center	Canada	Kingston Frontenacs (OHL)
5	150	Alexander Pechurski	Goaltender	Russia	Metallurg Magnitogorsk-2 (RUS-3)
6	180	Patrick Killeen	Goaltender	Canada	Brampton Battalion (OHL)
7	210	Nicholas D'Agostino	Defense	Canada	St. Michael's Buzzers (OPJHL)

Draft notes

- The Pittsburgh Penguins' first-round pick went to the Atlanta Thrashers as the result of a February 26, 2008 trade that sent Marian Hossa and Pascal Dupuis to the Penguins in exchange for Angelo Esposito, Colby Armstrong, Erik Christensen and this pick.
- The Pittsburgh Penguins' second-round pick went to the Toronto Maple Leafs as the result of a February 26, 2008 trade that sent Hal Gill to the Penguins in exchange for a 2009 fifth-round pick and this pick.
- The Pittsburgh Penguins' third-round pick went to the Phoenix Coyotes as the result of a February 27, 200 trade that sent Georges Laraque to the Penguins in exchange for Daniel Carcillo and this pick.

== Farm teams ==
Chris Minard, the AHL's leading goal scorer at time of announcement, was selected as a starter for Team Canada in the 2009 All Star Classic. Jeff Taffe and Ben Lovejoy were selected as reserves for the PlanetUSA team. All three players were under two-way NHL contracts and played games with Pittsburgh during the season. In the game, Taffe scored three goals and recorded two assists.

Janne Pesonen, who signed a contract with the Penguins in July 2008, finished the 2008–09 season as the AHL's fourth-leading scorer, set a new record for points in a single season for the team, surpassing Toby Petersen's 67-point season in 2000–01, and his 82 points were the most ever by a Finn in AHL history.

== Media affiliates ==
WXDX-FM 105.9 of Pittsburgh was the radio flagship station for the Penguins for the third season. In April, the team and the station agreed to a six-year contract extension. Mike Lange, former Penguin Phil Bourque and Bob Grove were the station's broadcasters.

FSN Pittsburgh was the primary television network. Paul Steigerwald, Dan Potash, Rob King, and former Penguins Bob Errey and Jay Caufield were the station's broadcast team. During the semi-final playoff round against the Washington Capitals, game five set a record as the highest watched game on any FSN regional network in history. It was then surpassed by games six and seven; the final game of the series drew a 24.97 average rating—twice the viewers than the second most watched show of the evening.

== See also ==
- 2008–09 NHL season
