= Richard Park (ice hockey) =

Korean-American ice hockey player (born 1976)

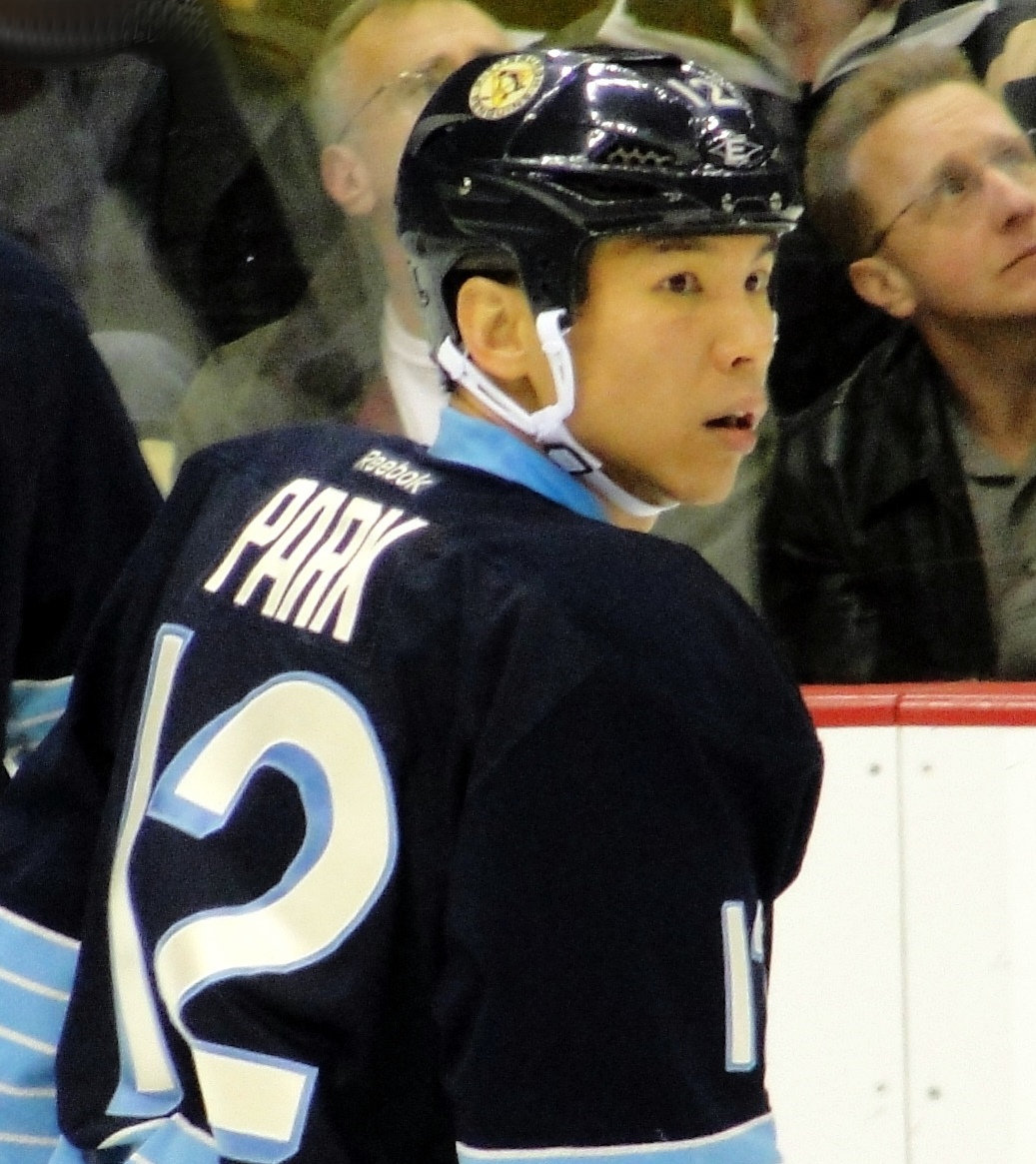
- Park with the Pittsburgh Penguins in 2012
- Born: May 27, 1976 (age 50) Seoul, South Korea
- Height: 6 ft 0 in (183 cm)
- Weight: 190 lb (86 kg; 13 st 8 lb)
- Position: Right wing
- Shot: Right
- Played for: HC Ambrì-Piotta; Pittsburgh Penguins; Genève-Servette HC; Mighty Ducks of Anaheim; Philadelphia Flyers; Minnesota Wild; Vancouver Canucks; New York Islanders
- National team: United States
- NHL draft: 50th overall, 1994; Pittsburgh Penguins
- Playing career: 1995–2014
Medal record
Representing United States
Ice hockey
World Championships
Bronze medal – third place	2004 Prague

Richard Park (Korean name: Bak Yong-Su, Hangul: 박용수; born May 27, 1976) is a South Korean-born American former professional ice hockey forward who played 14 National Hockey League (NHL) seasons with six different teams. Park is currently a pro scout for the Minnesota Wild.

== Playing career ==
Born in Seoul, South Korea, Park moved to Rancho Palos Verdes, California, with his family at age three. As a youth, he played in the 1989 Quebec International Pee-Wee Hockey Tournament with the Los Angeles Kings minor ice hockey team. At age 13, he moved to Ontario and played minor hockey in the Greater Toronto Hockey League (GTHL), and played in the 1990 Quebec International Pee-Wee Hockey Tournament with the Toronto Young Nationals. Park and his brother Horton attended De La Salle College and captained their hockey team. He eventually worked his way up to the Belleville Bulls of the Ontario Hockey League (OHL) and played for Belleville from 1992–93 to 1995–96.

Following his second OHL season, he was drafted 50th overall by the Pittsburgh Penguins during the 1994 NHL entry draft. He made his NHL debut when he played one regular season game and three Stanley Cup playoff games for Pittsburgh during the 1994–95 season. He became only the second Korean-born person to play in the NHL after Jim Paek. Coincidentally, both of them were drafted by the Penguins. Park played most of the 1995–96 NHL season, appearing in 56 games. He spent the next few years moving between the Anaheim Ducks, Philadelphia Flyers and various International Hockey League (IHL) and American Hockey League (AHL) teams. He played again in the NHL during the 2001–02 season after signing with the Minnesota Wild.

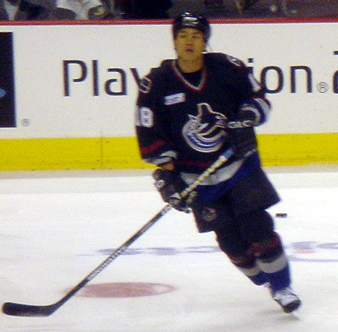
Park with the Vancouver Canucks in 2005.

Park spent three seasons in Minnesota, from 2001–02 to 2003–04, where over the course of several seasons, he achieved career-highs in games played (81), goals scored (14), assists earned (15) and points totalled (25). During the Wild's run in the 2003 Stanley Cup playoffs, Park scored the winning goal in overtime in Game 6 of the Western Conference Quarterfinals against the Colorado Avalanche.

During the 2004–05 NHL lockout, Park played in Europe as a member of the United States national men's ice hockey team, which won the 2004 Deutschland Cup. He would go on to sign short-term contracts in Sweden and Switzerland with the Malmö Redhawks and SCL Tigers respectively. On August 8, 2005, prior to the 2005–06 season, Park signed a one-year, US$750,000 contract with the Vancouver Canucks. At the end of his contract, he signed a two-year contract with the New York Islanders.

On March 29, 2008, Park was named the recipient of the Bob Nystrom Award, awarded annually to the Islander "who best exemplifies leadership, hustle and dedication". Park usually played in a penalty killing role and is considered an above-average skater. He also served as the Islanders alternate captain in the 2008–09 season. During his time with the Islanders, he scored two shorthanded goals on 5-on-3's, a very rare feat in the NHL.

On September 9, 2010, Park left the NHL after 684 career games, signing a three-year contract with Genève-Servette HC of the National League A (NLA), marking his return to Switzerland after a brief stint during the 2004–05 lockout.

On September 8, 2011, Park made a return to the NHL, signing a one-year, two-way contract for a second stint with the Pittsburgh Penguins.

In August 2012, Park signed a two-year contract to return to the NLA with HC Ambrì-Piotta, where he finished his playing career.

== Post-playing career ==
In 2014, Park was hired as a player development coach for the Minnesota Wild organization. During the 2018–19 season, he transitioned to the role of pro scout.

Park served as assistant coach of the South Korea men's national ice hockey team from 2014 to 2018.

== Career statistics ==
=== Regular season and playoffs ===
			Regular season					Playoffs
Season	Team	League	GP	G	A	Pts	PIM	GP	G	A	Pts	PIM
1992–93	Belleville Bulls	OHL	66	23	38	61	38	5	0	0	0	14
1993–94	Belleville Bulls	OHL	59	27	49	76	70	12	3	5	8	18
1994–95	Belleville Bulls	OHL	45	28	51	79	35	16	9	18	27	12
1994–95	Pittsburgh Penguins	NHL	1	0	1	1	2	3	0	0	0	2
1995–96	Belleville Bulls	OHL	6	7	6	13	2	14	18	12	30	10
1995–96	Pittsburgh Penguins	NHL	56	4	6	10	36	1	0	0	0	0
1996–97	Cleveland Lumberjacks	IHL	50	12	15	27	30	—	—	—	—	—
1996–97	Pittsburgh Penguins	NHL	1	0	0	0	0	—	—	—	—	—
1996–97	Mighty Ducks of Anaheim	NHL	11	1	1	2	10	11	0	1	1	2
1997–98	Cincinnati Mighty Ducks	AHL	56	17	26	43	36	—	—	—	—	—
1997–98	Mighty Ducks of Anaheim	NHL	15	0	2	2	8	—	—	—	—	—
1998–99	Philadelphia Phantoms	AHL	75	41	42	83	33	16	9	6	15	4
1998–99	Philadelphia Flyers	NHL	7	0	0	0	0	—	—	—	—	—
1999–2000	Utah Grizzlies	IHL	82	28	32	60	36	5	1	0	1	0
2000–01	Cleveland Lumberjacks	IHL	75	27	21	48	29	4	0	2	2	4
2001–02	Houston Aeros	AHL	13	4	10	14	6	—	—	—	—	—
2001–02	Minnesota Wild	NHL	63	10	15	25	10	—	—	—	—	—
2002–03	Minnesota Wild	NHL	81	14	10	24	16	18	3	3	6	4
2003–04	Minnesota Wild	NHL	73	13	12	25	28	—	—	—	—	—
2004–05	Malmö Redhawks	SEL	9	1	3	4	4	—	—	—	—	—
2004–05	SCL Tigers	NLA	10	3	0	3	8	—	—	—	—	—
2005–06	Vancouver Canucks	NHL	60	8	10	18	29	—	—	—	—	—
2006–07	New York Islanders	NHL	82	10	16	26	33	5	0	1	1	2
2007–08	New York Islanders	NHL	82	12	20	32	20	—	—	—	—	—
2008–09	New York Islanders	NHL	71	14	17	31	34	—	—	—	—	—
2009–10	New York Islanders	NHL	81	9	22	31	28	—	—	—	—	—
2010–11	Genève–Servette HC	NLA	47	15	19	34	16	3	2	1	3	2
2011–12	Pittsburgh Penguins	NHL	54	7	7	14	12	2	0	1	1	2
2012–13	HC Ambrì–Piotta	NLA	48	9	22	31	18	—	—	—	—	—
2013–14	HC Ambrì–Piotta	NLA	41	12	17	29	22	4	1	0	1	29
NHL totals			738	102	139	241	266	40	3	6	9	12

=== International ===
Year	Team	Event	Results	GP	G	A	Pts	PIM
1994	United States	WJC	6th	7	3	2	5	4
1995	United States	WJC	5th	7	1	7	8	29
2002	United States	WC	7th	7	3	3	6	0
2004	United States	WC	3rd place, bronze medalist(s)	9	5	3	8	0
2005	United States	WC	6th	5	1	0	1	0
2006	United States	WC	7th	7	1	1	2	0
Junior totals				14	4	9	13	33
Senior totals				28	10	7	17	0

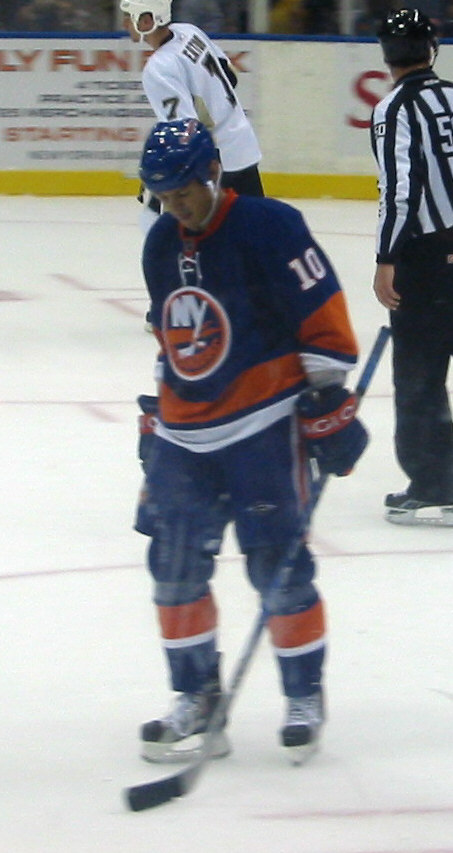
Richard Park on the Nassau Coliseum ice, playing for the New York Islanders.

== Awards ==
- Bob Nystrom Award – 2007–08
- OHL All-Rookie Team – 1993
- AHL Second All-Star Team – 1999

== Transactions ==
- March 18, 1997 – Traded to Anaheim by Pittsburgh for Roman Oksiuta.
- August 24, 1998 – Signed as a free agent by Philadelphia.
- September 22, 1999 – Signed as a free agent by Utah (IHL).
- June 6, 2000 – Signed as a free agent by Minnesota.
- November 8, 2004 – Signed as a free agent by Malmo (Sweden).
- January 4, 2005 – Signed as a free agent by Langnau (Swiss).
- August 8, 2005 – Signed as a free agent by Vancouver.
- October 2, 2006 – Signed as a free agent by NY Islanders.
- September 9, 2010 – Signed as a free agent by Geneve (Swiss).
- September 8, 2011 – Signed as a free agent by Pittsburgh.
- August 7, 2012 – Signed as a free agent by Ambri-Piotta (Swiss).
- October 14, 2014 – Retired.

Awards and achievements
Preceded by Andrew Brunette	Minnesota Wild captain December 2003	Succeeded by Brad Bombardir
