= 2008–09 New York Islanders season =

NHL hockey team season

2008–09 New York Islanders
- Division: 5th Atlantic
- Conference: 15th Eastern
- 2008–09 record: 26–47–9
- Home record: 17–18–6
- Road record: 9–29–3
- Goals for: 201
- Goals against: 279

Team information
- General manager: Garth Snow
- Coach: Scott Gordon
- Captain: Bill Guerin (Oct.–Mar.); Vacant (Mar.–Apr.)
- Alternate captains: Richard Park; Mike Sillinger; Doug Weight; Brendan Witt
- Arena: Nassau Veterans Memorial Coliseum
- Average attendance: Average: 13,773; Capacity: 84.5% Total: 564,697

Team leaders
- Goals: Kyle Okposo (18)
- Assists: Mark Streit (40)
- Points: Mark Streit (56)
- Penalty minutes: Tim Jackman (155)
- Plus/minus: Mark Streit; Dean McAmmond; Joe Callahan (+5)
- Wins: Joey MacDonald (14)
- Goals against average: Yann Danis (2.86)

The 2008–09 New York Islanders season was the 37th season in franchise history. On April 14, 2009, the Islanders won the NHL draft lottery to receive the first overall draft pick in the 2009 NHL entry draft.

== Regular season ==
Captain Bill Guerin was traded to the Pittsburgh Penguins in March. The captaincy was left vacant for the rest of the season.

=== Divisional standings ===
Atlantic Division
		GP	W	L	OTL	GF	GA	Pts
**1**	**New Jersey Devils**	**82**	**51**	**27**	**4**	**244**	**209**	**106**
**2**	**Pittsburgh Penguins**	**82**	**45**	**28**	**9**	**264**	**239**	**99**
**3**	**Philadelphia Flyers**	**82**	**44**	**27**	**11**	**264**	**238**	**99**
**4**	**New York Rangers**	**82**	**43**	**30**	**9**	**210**	**218**	**95**
5	New York Islanders	82	26	47	9	201	279	61

=== Conference standings ===
Eastern Conference
R		Div	GP	W	L	OTL	GF	GA	Pts
**1**	**z – Boston Bruins**	**NE**	**82**	**53**	**19**	**10**	**274**	**196**	116
**2**	**y – Washington Capitals**	**SE**	**82**	**50**	**24**	**8**	**272**	**245**	108
**3**	**y – New Jersey Devils**	**AT**	**82**	**51**	**27**	**4**	**244**	**209**	106
**4**	**Pittsburgh Penguins**	**AT**	**82**	**45**	**28**	**9**	**264**	**239**	99
**5**	**Philadelphia Flyers**	**AT**	**82**	**44**	**27**	**11**	**264**	**238**	99
**6**	**Carolina Hurricanes**	**SE**	**82**	**45**	**30**	**7**	**239**	**226**	97
**7**	**New York Rangers**	**AT**	**82**	**43**	**30**	**9**	**210**	**218**	95
**8**	**Montreal Canadiens**	**NE**	**82**	**41**	**30**	**11**	**249**	**247**	93
8.5
9	Florida Panthers	SE	82	41	30	11	234	231	93
10	Buffalo Sabres	NE	82	41	32	9	250	234	91
11	Ottawa Senators	NE	82	36	35	11	217	237	83
12	Toronto Maple Leafs	NE	82	34	35	13	250	293	81
13	Atlanta Thrashers	SE	82	35	41	6	257	280	76
14	Tampa Bay Lightning	SE	82	24	40	18	210	279	66
15	New York Islanders	AT	82	26	47	9	201	279	61

bold – qualified for playoffs, y – division winner, z – placed first in conference (and division)

AT – Atlantic Division, NE – Northeast Division, SE – Southeast Division

== Schedule and results ==
2008–09 game log

October: 2–6–1 (Home: 1–4–0; Road: 1–2–1)
#	Date	Visitor	Score	Home	OT	Decision	Attendance	Record	Pts
1	October 10	New York Islanders	1 – 2	New Jersey Devils		MacDonald	16,834	0–1–0	0
2	October 11	St. Louis Blues	2 – 5	New York Islanders		MacDonald	16,234	1–1–0	2
3	October 13	Buffalo Sabres	7 – 1	New York Islanders		MacDonald	13,523	1–2–0	2
4	October 16	New York Islanders	4 – 3	Tampa Bay Lightning	OT	MacDonald	14,420	2–2–0	4
5	October 18	New York Islanders	0 – 2	Florida Panthers		DiPietro	16,087	2–3–0	4
6	October 23	Dallas Stars	5 – 3	New York Islanders		DiPietro	10,183	2–4–0	4
7	October 25	Carolina Hurricanes	4 – 3	New York Islanders		MacDonald	11,219	2–5–0	4
8	October 27	New York Rangers	4 – 2	New York Islanders		MacDonald	15,581	2–6–0	4
9	October 30	New York Islanders	2 – 3	Philadelphia Flyers	OT	MacDonald	18,227	2–6–1	5

November: 8-6-1 (Home: 4–3–1; Road: 4-3–0)
#	Date	Visitor	Score	Home	OT	Decision	Attendance	Record	Pts
10	November 1	Montreal Canadiens	5 – 4	New York Islanders		Danis	14,429	2–7–1	5
11	November 3	Columbus Blue Jackets	3 – 4	New York Islanders	OT	MacDonald	10,184	3–7–1	7
12	November 4	New York Islanders	2 – 1	New York Rangers		MacDonald	18,200	4–7–1	9
13	November 6	New York Islanders	3 – 4	Atlanta Thrashers		MacDonald	14,122	4–8–1	9
14	November 8	Pittsburgh Penguins	4 – 3	New York Islanders	SO	MacDonald	14,303	4–8–2	10
15	November 11	Philadelphia Flyers	3 – 1	New York Islanders		MacDonald	13,447	4–9–2	10
16	November 13	New York Islanders	3 – 1	Ottawa Senators		MacDonald	19,061	5–9–2	12
17	November 15	Ottawa Senators	2 – 3	New York Islanders		MacDonald	13,722	6–9–2	14
18	November 17	Vancouver Canucks	1 – 2	New York Islanders	SO	MacDonald	11,299	7–9–2	16
19	November 21	New York Islanders	2 – 5	New Jersey Devils		MacDonald	17,138	7–10–2	16
20	November 22	New York Islanders	4 – 2	Buffalo Sabres		MacDonald	18,529	8–10–2	18
21	November 24	New York Islanders	4 – 3	Montreal Canadiens	SO	MacDonald	21,273	9–10–2	20
22	November 26	Pittsburgh Penguins	5 – 3	New York Islanders		MacDonald	14,871	9–11–2	20
23	November 28	New York Islanders	2 – 7	Boston Bruins		MacDonald	17,565	9–12–2	20
24	November 29	Ottawa Senators	2 – 4	New York Islanders		MacDonald	13,108	10–12–2	22

December: 2-10-2 (Home: 2–2–1; Road: 0–8–1)
#	Date	Visitor	Score	Home	OT	Decision	Attendance	Record	Pts
25	December 4	New York Islanders	2 – 5	Washington Capitals		MacDonald	18,130	10–13–2	22
26	December 6	Atlanta Thrashers	5 – 1	New York Islanders		MacDonald	14,174	10–14–2	22
27	December 8	New York Islanders	2 – 4	Toronto Maple Leafs		MacDonald	19,309	10–15–2	22
28	December 9	New York Islanders	3 – 4	Philadelphia Flyers		Danis	19,037	10–16–2	22
29	December 11	New York Islanders	2 – 9	Pittsburgh Penguins		MacDonald	16,972	10–17–2	22
30	December 13	New York Islanders	1 – 3	Columbus Blue Jackets		MacDonald	15,443	10–18–2	22
31	December 16	Washington Capitals	5 – 4	New York Islanders	OT	MacDonald	11,655	10–18–3	23
32	December 19	New York Islanders	1 – 4	Minnesota Wild		MacDonald	18,568	10–19–3	23
33	December 20	New York Islanders	0 – 1	Nashville Predators		MacDonald	16,457	10–20–3	23
34	December 23	Atlanta Thrashers	4 – 2	New York Islanders		MacDonald	14,227	10–21–3	23
35	December 26	Toronto Maple Leafs	1 – 4	New York Islanders		DiPietro	15,173	11–21–3	25
36	December 27	New York Islanders	3 – 4	Buffalo Sabres	SO	MacDonald	18,690	11–21–4	26
37	December 29	New York Islanders	4 – 5	New York Rangers		MacDonald	18,200	11–22–4	26
38	December 31	Florida Panthers	2 – 4	New York Islanders		MacDonald	12,211	12–22–4	28

January: 3-7-1 (Home: 2–3–1; Road: 1–4–0)
#	Date	Visitor	Score	Home	OT	Decision	Attendance	Record	Pts
39	January 2	New York Islanders	4 – 5	Phoenix Coyotes		DiPietro	14,547	12–23–4	28
40	January 3	New York Islanders	3 – 5	San Jose Sharks		MacDonald	17,496	12–24–4	28
41	January 5	New York Islanders	2 – 3	Edmonton Oilers		MacDonald	16,839	12–25–4	28
42	January 8	New York Islanders	2 – 5	Calgary Flames		MacDonald	19,289	12–26–4	28
43	January 13	New York Rangers	2 – 1	New York Islanders		Danis	16,234	12–27–4	28
44	January 15	Boston Bruins	2 – 1	New York Islanders		Danis	15,548	12–28–4	28
45	January 17	New Jersey Devils	3 – 1	New York Islanders		Danis	16,234	12–29–4	28
46	January 19	Washington Capitals	2 – 1	New York Islanders	OT	Danis	15,221	12–29–5	29
47	January 21	Anaheim Ducks	1 – 2	New York Islanders		Danis	11,853	13–29–5	31
48	January 29	New York Islanders	5 – 4	Atlanta Thrashers		Danis	15,200	14–29–5	33
49	January 31	Florida Panthers	1 – 3	New York Islanders		Danis	13,336	15–29–5	35

February: 4-7-2 (Home: 4–1–2; Road: 0–6–0)
#	Date	Visitor	Score	Home	OT	Decision	Attendance	Record	Pts
50	February 3	Tampa Bay Lightning	1 – 3	New York Islanders		Danis	9,808	16–29–5	37
51	February 5	New York Islanders	2 – 3	Florida Panthers		MacDonald	14,206	16–30–5	37
52	February 7	New York Islanders	0 – 1	Tampa Bay Lightning		Danis	14,810	16–31–5	37
53	February 10	Los Angeles Kings	4 – 3	New York Islanders	SO	Danis	12,330	16–31–6	38
54	February 11	New York Islanders	2 – 4	New Jersey Devils		MacDonald	14,251	16–32–6	38
55	February 14	New York Islanders	1 – 5	Philadelphia Flyers		Danis	19,789	16–33–6	38
56	February 16	Pittsburgh Penguins	2 – 3	New York Islanders	SO	MacDonald	16,234	17–33–6	40
57	February 18	New York Islanders	1 – 3	New York Rangers		Danis	18,200	17–34–6	40
58	February 19	Carolina Hurricanes	6 – 2	New York Islanders		MacDonald	11,802	17–35–6	40
59	February 21	New Jersey Devils	0 – 4	New York Islanders		Danis	15,511	18–35–6	42
60	February 25	New York Islanders	0 – 1	Pittsburgh Penguins		Danis	16,975	18–36–6	42
61	February 26	Toronto Maple Leafs	5 – 4	New York Islanders	SO	MacDonald	12,201	18–36–7	43
62	February 28	Buffalo Sabres	0 – 2	New York Islanders		Danis	14,198	19–36–7	45

March: 6-5-2 (Home: 3–2–1; Road: 3–3–1)
#	Date	Visitor	Score	Home	OT	Decision	Attendance	Record	Pts
63	March 2	Colorado Avalanche	2 – 4	New York Islanders		Danis	11,298	20–36–7	47
64	March 5	New York Rangers	4 – 2	New York Islanders		Danis	16,234	20–37–7	47
65	March 7	New Jersey Devils	3 – 7	New York Islanders		MacDonald	15,524	21–37–7	49
66	March 8	Phoenix Coyotes	2 – 3	New York Islanders		Danis	13,413	22–37–7	51
67	March 10	New York Islanders	2 – 3	Toronto Maple Leafs	OT	MacDonald	19,041	22–37–8	52
68	March 12	New York Islanders	3 – 2	Montreal Canadiens	OT	Danis	21,273	23–37–8	54
69	March 14	New York Islanders	1 – 2	Boston Bruins		Danis	17,565	23–38–8	54
70	March 15	New York Islanders	4 – 2	Chicago Blackhawks		Mannino	22,140	24–38–8	56
71	March 20	New York Islanders	4 – 5	Carolina Hurricanes		Mannino	18,137	24–39–8	56
72	March 21	New York Islanders	2 – 5	Ottawa Senators		Danis	19,751	24–40–8	56
73	March 25	Minnesota Wild	6 – 2	New York Islanders		Danis	13,332	24–41–8	56
74	March 27	New York Islanders	2 – 0	Detroit Red Wings		MacDonald	20,066	25–41–8	58
75	March 28	Philadelphia Flyers	4 – 3	New York Islanders	SO	Danis	16,234	25–41–9	59

April: 1-6-0 (Home: 1–3–0; Road: 0–3–0)
#	Date	Visitor	Score	Home	OT	Decision	Attendance	Record	Pts
76	April 1	New York Islanders	3 – 5	Washington Capitals		MacDonald	18,277	25–42–9	59
77	April 2	Montreal Canadiens	5 – 1	New York Islanders		Danis	15,255	25–43–9	59
78	April 4	Tampa Bay Lightning	1 – 3	New York Islanders		Danis	12,809	26–43–9	61
79	April 7	New York Islanders	0 – 9	Carolina Hurricanes		Danis	18,680	26–44–9	61
80	April 9	New York Islanders	1 – 6	Pittsburgh Penguins		Danis	17,132	26–45–9	61
81	April 11	Philadelphia Flyers	2 – 3	New York Islanders		Danis	16,234	26–46–9	61
82	April 12	Boston Bruins	2 – 6	New York Islanders		Danis	14,311	26–47–9	61

Legend: Win (2 points) Loss (0 points) Overtime/shootout loss (1 point)

== Playoffs ==
The New York Islanders did not qualify for the 2009 Stanley Cup playoffs.

== Player statistics ==
=== Skaters ===
Regular season

Player	GP	G	A	Pts	+/−	PIM
Mark Streit	74	16	40	56	+5	62
Kyle Okposo	65	18	21	39	-6	36
Doug Weight	53	10	28	38	-15	55
Bill Guerin^{‡}	61	16	20	36	-15	63
Frans Nielsen	59	9	24	33	-4	18
Richard Park	71	14	17	31	-13	34
Trent Hunter	55	14	17	31	-8	41
Andy Hilbert	67	11	16	27	-3	22
Blake Comeau	53	7	18	25	-17	32
Josh Bailey	68	7	18	25	-14	16
Sean Bergenheim	59	15	9	24	-2	64
Mike Comrie^{‡}	41	7	13	20	-8	26
Bruno Gervais	69	3	16	19	-15	33
Chris Campoli^{‡}	51	6	11	17	-20	43
Jon Sim	49	9	6	15	-12	42
Jeff Tambellini	65	7	8	15	-20	32
Tim Jackman	69	5	7	12	-17	155
Andy Sutton	23	2	8	10	+3	40
Radek Martinek	51	6	4	10	-16	28
Dean McAmmond^{†}	18	2	7	9	+5	8
Brendan Witt	65	0	9	9	-34	94
Freddy Meyer	27	4	5	9	-19	14tw
Jack Hillen	40	1	5	6	-9	16
Mike Iggulden	11	1	4	5	-3	4
Nate Thompson	43	2	2	4	-11	49
Thomas Pock	59	1	2	3	-17	35
Jesse Joensuu	7	1	2	3	-1	4
Mike Sillinger	7	2	0	2	-5	0
Joe Callahan	18	0	2	2	+5	4
Jeremy Colliton	6	0	1	1	-2	2
Kurtis McLean	4	1	0	1	+1	0
Trevor Smith	7	1	0	1	-3	0
Joel Rechlicz	17	0	1	1	-1	68
Mitch Fritz	20	0	0	0	-4	42
Ben Walter	4	0	0	0	-2	0
Brett Skinner	11	0	0	0	+2	4
Andrew MacDonald	3	0	0	0	+2	2
Jamie Fraser	1	0	0	0	0	0
Sean Bentivoglio	1	0	0	0	0	2

=== Goaltenders ===
Regular season

Player	GP	Min	W	L	OT	GA	GAA	SA	SV	Sv%	SO
Joey MacDonald	49	2792	14	26	6	157	3.37	1584	1427	.901	1
Yann Danis	31	1760	10	17	3	84	2.86	933	849	.910	2
Rick DiPietro	5	256	1	3	0	15	3.52	139	124	.892	0
Peter Mannino	3	133	1	1	0	10	4.51	87	77	.885	0

^{†}Denotes player spent time with another team before joining Islanders. Stats reflect time with Islanders only.
^{‡}Traded mid-season. Stats reflect time with Islanders only.

Note:

Pos = Position;GP = Games played; G = Goals; A = Assists; Pts = Points; PIM = Penalty minutes; +/- = Plus/minus; PPG = Power-play goals; SHG = Short-handed goals; GWG = Game-winning goals
Pos = Position;GP = Games played; Min, TOI = Minutes played; W = Wins; L = Losses; T,T/OT = Ties; OTL = Overtime losses; GA = Goals-against; GAA = Goals-against average; SO = Shutouts; SA = Shots against; SV = Shots saved;SV% = Save percentage;

== Awards and records ==
=== Milestones ===
Regular Season
Player	Milestone	Reached
Sean Bergenheim	100th NHL PIM	October 13, 2008
Doug Weight	900th NHL PIM	October 23, 2008
Brett Skinner	1st NHL Game	October 27, 2008
Mitch Fritz	1st NHL Game	October 30, 2008
Jon Sim	100th NHL Point	November 1, 2008
Nate Thompson	1st NHL Goal; 1st NHL Point	November 4, 2008
Richard Park	200th NHL PIM	November 6, 2008
Josh Bailey	1st NHL Game	November 11, 2008
Josh Bailey	1st NHL Assist; 1st NHL Point	November 13, 2008
Andy Sutton	500th NHL Game	November 17, 2008

== Transactions ==
=== Trades ===
June 20, 2008	To New York Islanders 1st-round pick (7th overall) in 2008; Two conditional picks	To Toronto Maple Leafs 1st-round pick (5th overall) in 2008
June 20, 2008	To New York Islanders 1st-round pick (9th overall) in 2008; 2nd-round pick (40th overall) in 2008	To Nashville Predators 1st-round pick (7th overall) in 2008
January 13, 2009	To New York Islanders Junior Lessard	To Atlanta Thrashers Brett Skinner
February 22, 2009	To New York Islanders Dean McAmmond; 1st-round pick in 2009	To Ottawa Senators Chris Campoli; Mike Comrie
March 4, 2009	To New York Islanders Conditional 3rd-round pick in 2009 (Note: Condition satisfied.)	To Pittsburgh Penguins Bill Guerin

=== Free agents ===
Player	Former team	Contract Terms
Doug Weight	Anaheim Ducks	1 year, $1,750,000
Mark Streit	Montreal Canadiens	5 years, $20,500,000

Player	New team
Ruslan Fedotenko	Pittsburgh Penguins
Miroslav Satan	Pittsburgh Penguins
Aaron Johnson	Chicago Blackhawks

=== Claimed from waivers ===
Player	Former team	Date claimed off waivers
Thomas Pock	New York Rangers	September 29, 2008

== Draft picks ==
The Islanders picks at the 2008 NHL entry draft in Ottawa, Ontario.

Round	#	Player	Position	Nationality	College/junior/club team (league)
1	9	Josh Bailey	C	Canada	Windsor Spitfires (OHL)
2	36	Corey Trivino	C	Canada	Stouffville Spirit (OPJHL)
2	40	Aaron Ness	D	United States	Roseau High School (USHS-MN)
2	53	Travis Hamonic	D	Canada	Moose Jaw Warriors (WHL)
3	66	David Toews	C	Canada	Shattuck-Saint Mary's (USHS-MN)
3	72	Jyri Niemi	D	Finland	Saskatoon Blades (WHL)
3	73	Kirill Petrov	RW	Russia	Ak Bars Kazan (Russia)
4	96	Matt Donovan	D	United States	Cedar Rapids (USHL)
4	102	David Ullstrom	W	Sweden	HV71 (Sweden)
5	126	Kevin Poulin	G	Canada	Victoriaville Tigres (QMJHL)
5	148	Matt Martin	LW	Canada	Sarnia Sting (OHL)
6	156	Jared Spurgeon	D	Canada	Spokane Chiefs (WHL)
6	175	Justin DiBenedetto	C	Canada	Sarnia Sting (OHL)

== Farm teams ==
The Bridgeport Sound Tigers of the American Hockey League, the Utah Grizzlies of the ECHL, and the Odessa Jackalopes of the Central Hockey League are the Islanders' minor league affiliates for the 2008–09 season.

== See also ==
- 2008–09 NHL season
