= Andy Wozniewski =

American ice hockey player (born 1980)

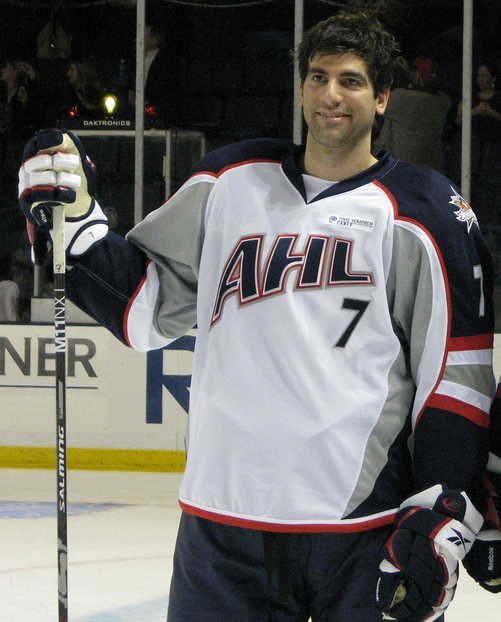
- Wozniewski in 2010
- Born: May 20, 1980 (age 46) Buffalo Grove, Illinois, U.S.
- Height: 6 ft 5 in (196 cm)
- Weight: 225 lb (102 kg; 16 st 1 lb)
- Position: Defense
- Shot: Left
- Played for: Toronto Maple Leafs; St. Louis Blues; Boston Bruins; EV Zug; EHC München
- NHL draft: Undrafted
- Playing career: 2004–2015

Andrew Pera Wozniewski (born May 25, 1980) is an American former professional ice hockey defenseman who played in the National Hockey League (NHL) with the Toronto Maple Leafs, St. Louis Blues and the Boston Bruins.

== Playing career ==
Undrafted, Wozniewski played collegiate hockey for the University of Wisconsin–Madison. He signed his first pro contract with the Toronto Maple Leafs on May 27, 2004. He scored his first NHL goal October 11, 2007 for the Toronto Maple Leafs against the New York Islanders.

Andy was signed as a free agent by the St. Louis Blues on July 17, 2008, and later assigned to the Blues affiliate, the Peoria Rivermen. Wozniewski was recalled to the Blues on February 1, 2009. He played in one game with the Blues before he was reassigned to the Rivermen.

Wozniewski was traded from the Blues to the Pittsburgh Penguins in exchange for Danny Richmond on March 4, 2009.

After the Penguins, Wozniewski signed with the Boston Bruins, on May 5, 2010, Wozniewski left the Bruins and signed a one-year contract in the Swiss NLA with EV Zug.

After three seasons with Zug, Wozniewski left Switzerland out of contract and signed a one-year deal as a free agent in the German DEL, with EHC München on June 4, 2013. During his time in Europe, Wozniewski was selected to play for Team USA in the Deutschland Cup in 2011 and 2013, leading Team USA to a championship as the Captain in 2013.

== Career statistics ==
			Regular season					Playoffs
Season	Team	League	GP	G	A	Pts	PIM	GP	G	A	Pts	PIM
1998–99	Dubuque Fighting Saints	USHL	56	9	8	17	22	2	0	0	0	0
1999–00	UMass Lowell	HE	17	1	1	2	8	—	—	—	—	—
2000–01	Texas Tornado	NAHL	54	10	34	44	98	—	—	—	—	—
2001–02	Wisconsin Badgers	WCHA	39	3	13	16	54	—	—	—	—	—
2002–03	Wisconsin Badgers	WCHA	34	1	7	8	47	—	—	—	—	—
2003–04	Wisconsin Badgers	WCHA	43	6	8	14	104	—	—	—	—	—
2003–04	St. John's Maple Leafs	AHL	3	0	1	1	0	—	—	—	—	—
2004–05	St. John's Maple Leafs	AHL	28	1	4	5	20	—	—	—	—	—
2005–06	Toronto Maple Leafs	NHL	13	0	1	1	13	—	—	—	—	—
2005–06	Toronto Marlies	AHL	31	4	11	15	42	—	—	—	—	—
2006–07	Toronto Maple Leafs	NHL	15	0	2	2	14	—	—	—	—	—
2006–07	Toronto Marlies	AHL	5	0	3	3	8	—	—	—	—	—
2007–08	Toronto Maple Leafs	NHL	48	2	7	9	54	—	—	—	—	—
2007–08	Toronto Marlies	AHL	33	7	10	17	26	19	4	5	9	14
2008–09	Peoria Rivermen	AHL	56	1	16	17	56	—	—	—	—	—
2008–09	St. Louis Blues	NHL	1	0	0	0	0	—	—	—	—	—
2008–09	Wilkes-Barre/Scranton Penguins	AHL	18	2	2	4	26	6	1	1	2	2
2009–10	Providence Bruins	AHL	68	10	33	43	69	—	—	—	—	—
2009–10	Boston Bruins	NHL	2	0	0	0	0	—	—	—	—	—
2010–11	EV Zug	NLA	50	10	13	23	123	10	1	4	5	6
2011–12	EV Zug	NLA	47	11	23	34	75	6	1	4	5	16
2012–13	EV Zug	NLA	35	3	7	10	36	10	1	4	5	4
2013–14	EHC München	DEL	52	7	17	24	69	1	0	0	0	25
2014–15	EHC München	DEL	19	1	4	5	28	—	—	—	—	—
NHL totals			79	2	10	12	81	—	—	—	—	—
