= 2008–09 Philadelphia Flyers season =

NHL hockey team season

2008–09 Philadelphia Flyers
- Division: 3rd Atlantic
- Conference: 5th Eastern
- 2008–09 record: 44–27–11
- Home record: 24–13–4
- Road record: 20–14–7
- Goals for: 264
- Goals against: 238

Team information
- General manager: Paul Holmgren
- Coach: John Stevens
- Captain: Mike Richards
- Alternate captains: Simon Gagne; Kimmo Timonen
- Arena: Wachovia Center
- Average attendance: 19,545
- Minor league affiliates: Philadelphia Phantoms; Mississippi Sea Wolves

Team leaders
- Goals: Jeff Carter (46)
- Assists: Mike Richards (50)
- Points: Jeff Carter (84)
- Penalty minutes: Riley Cote (174)
- Plus/minus: Jeff Carter (+23)
- Wins: Martin Biron (29)
- Goals against average: Martin Biron (2.76)

The 2008–09 Philadelphia Flyers season was the franchise's 42nd season in the National Hockey League (NHL). The Flyers lost in the first round of the playoffs to the Pittsburgh Penguins in six games.

== Regular season ==
The Flyers began the 2008–09 season by naming Mike Richards the 17th captain in Flyers history on September 17, with Jason Smith headed to the Ottawa Senators as a free agent. The Flyers were looking to build on the success of the previous season, but instead got off to an 0–3–3 start which became indicative of the season ahead. Despite a solid December and January, and finishing with four points more than the year before, for the most part the 2008–09 Flyers were an inconsistent unit, playing at the top of their ability one night while subpar the next. Defenseman Derian Hatcher missed the entire regular season and playoffs with a knee injury, and Steve Downie was traded to the Tampa Bay Lightning for defenseman Matt Carle. Two pleasant surprises were the emergence of rookie center Claude Giroux and defenseman Luca Sbisa, who was drafted by the Flyers in June with the 19th overall pick acquired from the Columbus Blue Jackets in exchange for R. J. Umberger, the victim of a salary cap crunch. Scottie Upshall also found himself the victim of such a crunch, traded to the Phoenix Coyotes for Daniel Carcillo at the trade deadline.

Despite holding on to the fourth seed in the Eastern Conference for much of the season, due to a 4–5–1 finish to the season, highlighted by a home loss to the New York Rangers on the last day of the regular season, the Flyers slipped to the fifth seed and lost home-ice advantage in their first round series with the Pittsburgh Penguins.

The Flyers finished the regular season having scored the most shorthanded goals in the NHL, with 16, and having allowed the fewest shorthanded goals, with just one.

=== Divisional standings ===
Atlantic Division
		GP	W	L	OTL	GF	GA	Pts
**1**	**New Jersey Devils**	**82**	**51**	**27**	**4**	**244**	**209**	**106**
**2**	**Pittsburgh Penguins**	**82**	**45**	**28**	**9**	**264**	**239**	**99**
**3**	**Philadelphia Flyers**	**82**	**44**	**27**	**11**	**264**	**238**	**99**
**4**	**New York Rangers**	**82**	**43**	**30**	**9**	**210**	**218**	**95**
5	New York Islanders	82	26	47	9	201	279	61

=== Conference standings ===
Eastern Conference
R		Div	GP	W	L	OTL	GF	GA	Pts
**1**	**z – Boston Bruins**	**NE**	**82**	**53**	**19**	**10**	**274**	**196**	116
**2**	**y – Washington Capitals**	**SE**	**82**	**50**	**24**	**8**	**272**	**245**	108
**3**	**y – New Jersey Devils**	**AT**	**82**	**51**	**27**	**4**	**244**	**209**	106
**4**	**Pittsburgh Penguins**	**AT**	**82**	**45**	**28**	**9**	**264**	**239**	99
**5**	**Philadelphia Flyers**	**AT**	**82**	**44**	**27**	**11**	**264**	**238**	99
**6**	**Carolina Hurricanes**	**SE**	**82**	**45**	**30**	**7**	**239**	**226**	97
**7**	**New York Rangers**	**AT**	**82**	**43**	**30**	**9**	**210**	**218**	95
**8**	**Montreal Canadiens**	**NE**	**82**	**41**	**30**	**11**	**249**	**247**	93
8.5
9	Florida Panthers	SE	82	41	30	11	234	231	93
10	Buffalo Sabres	NE	82	41	32	9	250	234	91
11	Ottawa Senators	NE	82	36	35	11	217	237	83
12	Toronto Maple Leafs	NE	82	34	35	13	250	293	81
13	Atlanta Thrashers	SE	82	35	41	6	257	280	76
14	Tampa Bay Lightning	SE	82	24	40	18	210	279	66
15	New York Islanders	AT	82	26	47	9	201	279	61

bold – qualified for playoffs, y – division winner, z – placed first in conference (and division)

AT – Atlantic Division, NE – Northeast Division, SE – Southeast Division

== Playoffs ==
Pittsburgh dominated the Flyers in Game 1, and despite a better effort by the Flyers in Game 2, Pittsburgh came to Philadelphia with a 2–0 series lead. The Flyers were the better team in Games 3 and 4, but Pittsburgh gained a split in Philadelphia and took a 3–1 series lead. After a decisive 3–0 win in Game 5, the Flyers jumped out to a 3–0 lead in Game 6, but promptly fell victim to the inconsistencies that plagued the team all season and gave up five unanswered goals in a season-ending 5–3 loss.

== Schedule and results ==
=== Preseason ===
2008 preseason
Preseason: 4–5–0 (home: 4–0–0; road: 0–5–0)

Game	Date	Score	Opponent	Decision	Attendance	Record	Recap
1	September 22	4–1	New Jersey Devils	Biron	17,108	1–0–0	W
2	September 24	1–3	@ Ottawa Senators	Aubin	17,038	1–1–0	L
3^{[a]}	September 25	5–4	New York Islanders	Aubin	7,706	2–1–0	W
4^{[b]}	September 27	4–2	Carolina Hurricanes	Biron	17,700	3–1–0	W
5	September 28	0–1	@ Carolina Hurricanes	Aubin	11,265	3–2–0	L
6	October 1	2–1	Washington Capitals	Biron	17,523	4–2–0	W
7	October 3	1–5	@ Washington Capitals	Aubin	14,864	4–3–0	L
8	October 4	0–1	@ New Jersey Devils	Biron	9,558	4–4–0	L
9^{[b]}	October 7	2–4	@ Philadelphia Phantoms (AHL)	Aubin	17,077	4–5–0	L
Notes:^{a} Game played at John Labatt Centre in London, Ontario.^{b} Game played at Wachovia Spectrum in Philadelphia, Pennsylvania.

Legend: W Win (2 points) L Loss (0 points) OTL Overtime/shootout loss (1 point)

=== Regular season ===
2008–09 regular season
October: 4–3–3, 11 points (home: 2–2–1; road: 2–1–2)

Game	Date	Score	Opponent	Decision	Attendance	Record	Points	Recap
1	October 11	3–4	New York Rangers	Biron	19,623	0–1–0	0	L
2	October 13	3–5	Montreal Canadiens	Biron	19,323	0–2–0	0	L
3	October 14	2–3 OT	@ Pittsburgh Penguins	Niittymaki	16,965	0–2–1	1	OTL
4	October 16	2–5	@ Colorado Avalanche	Biron	18,007	0–3–1	1	L
5	October 18	4–5 OT	@ San Jose Sharks	Niittymaki	17,496	0–3–2	2	OTL
6	October 22	6–7 SO	San Jose Sharks	Biron	19,072	0–3–3	3	OTL
7	October 24	6–3	@ New Jersey Devils	Biron	15,529	1–3–3	5	W
8	October 25	3–2 OT	New Jersey Devils	Biron	19,611	2–3–3	7	W
9	October 28	7–0	@ Atlanta Thrashers	Niittymaki	13,207	3–3–3	9	W
10	October 30	3–2 OT	New York Islanders	Biron	18,227	4–3–3	11	W

November: 7–4–2, 16 points (home: 3–2–1; road: 4–2–1)

Game	Date	Score	Opponent	Decision	Attendance	Record	Points	Recap
11	November 2	4–5	Edmonton Oilers	Biron	19,437	4–4–3	11	L
12	November 6	1–4	@ Ottawa Senators	Niittymaki	18,938	4–5–3	11	L
13	November 8	1–2	Tampa Bay Lightning	Biron	19,412	4–6–3	11	L
14	November 11	3–1	@ New York Islanders	Biron	13,447	5–6–3	13	W
15	November 13	4–5 SO	@ Pittsburgh Penguins	Biron	17,132	5–6–4	14	OTL
16	November 15	2–1	@ Montreal Canadiens	Biron	21,273	6–6–4	16	W
17	November 16	4–3	Atlanta Thrashers	Niittymaki	19,437	7–6–4	18	W
18	November 21	3–0	@ Buffalo Sabres	Biron	18,256	8–6–4	20	W
19	November 22	4–3 OT	Phoenix Coyotes	Biron	19,520	9–6–4	22	W
20	November 24	4–3	Dallas Stars	Biron	19,171	10–6–4	24	W
21	November 26	3–1	@ Carolina Hurricanes	Niittymaki	15,057	11–6–4	26	W
22	November 28	2–3 OT	Carolina Hurricanes	Biron	19,587	11–6–5	27	OTL
23	November 29	2–4	@ Toronto Maple Leafs	Biron	19,387	11–7–5	27	L

December: 9–3–2, 20 points (home: 7–0–1; road: 2–3–1)

Game	Date	Score	Opponent	Decision	Attendance	Record	Points	Recap
24	December 2	4–3 OT	Tampa Bay Lightning	Biron	19,227	12–7–5	29	W
25	December 4	2–3 OT	New Jersey Devils	Biron	19,577	12–7–6	30	OTL
26	December 6	2–1 OT	@ Carolina Hurricanes	Niittymaki	14,061	13–7–6	32	W
27	December 9	4–3	New York Islanders	Biron	19,037	14–7–6	34	W
28	December 11	6–5 SO	Carolina Hurricanes	Niittymaki	19,057	15–7–6	36	W
29	December 13	6–3	Pittsburgh Penguins	Biron	19,811	16–7–6	38	W
30	December 16	5–2	Colorado Avalanche	Niittymaki	19,219	17–7–6	40	W
31	December 18	2–5	@ Montreal Canadiens	Niittymaki	21,273	17–8–6	40	L
32	December 20	7–1	Washington Capitals	Niittymaki	19,897	18–8–6	42	W
33	December 21	2–3 SO	@ New Jersey Devils	Niittymaki	14,426	18–8–7	43	OTL
34	December 23	6–4	Ottawa Senators	Nittymaki	19,578	19–8–7	45	W
35	December 26	1–5	@ Chicago Blackhawks	Biron	22,712	19–9–7	45	L
36	December 27	0–3	@ Columbus Blue Jackets	Niittymaki	18,402	19–10–7	45	L
37	December 30	3–2	@ Vancouver Canucks	Biron	18,630	20–10–7	47	W

January: 6–4–2, 14 points (home: 3–1–0; road: 3–3–2)

Game	Date	Score	Opponent	Decision	Attendance	Record	Points	Recap
38	January 2	5–4 SO	@ Anaheim Ducks	Biron	17,597	21–10–7	49	W
39	January 3	1–2 SO	@ Los Angeles Kings	Niittymaki	18,118	21–10–8	50	OTL
40	January 6	1–2 SO	@ Washington Capitals	Biron	18,277	21–10–9	51	OTL
41	January 8	3–1	Minnesota Wild	Biron	19,596	22–10–9	53	W
42	January 10	4–1	Toronto Maple Leafs	Biron	19,787	23–10–9	55	W
43	January 13	2–4	Pittsburgh Penguins	Biron	19,872	23–11–9	55	L
44	January 15	1–4	@ Tampa Bay Lightning	Biron	15,604	23–12–9	55	L
45	January 16	3–2 SO	@ Florida Panthers	Niittymaki	17,827	24–12–9	57	W
46	January 21	5–3	Atlanta Thrashers	Niittymaki	19,766	25–12–9	59	W
47	January 27	2–3	@ Florida Panthers	Biron	13,904	25–13–9	59	L
48	January 30	6–1	@ Tampa Bay Lightning	Niittymaki	18,120	26–13–9	61	W
49	January 31	0–4	@ St. Louis Blues	Niittymaki	19,150	26–14–9	61	L

February: 7–3–1, 15 points (home: 3–3–1; road: 4–0–0)

Game	Date	Score	Opponent	Decision	Attendance	Record	Points	Recap
50	February 4	1–3	Boston Bruins	Biron	19,748	26–15–9	61	L
51	February 7	4–3 OT	@ Boston Bruins	Niittymaki	17,565	27–15–9	63	W
52	February 8	3–2	@ Atlanta Thrashers	Niittymaki	14,175	28–15–9	65	W
53	February 12	2–5	Ottawa Senators	Niittymaki	19,679	28–16–9	65	L
54	February 14	5–1	New York Islanders	Biron	19,789	29–16–9	67	W
55	February 15	5–2	@ New York Rangers	Biron	18,200	30–16–9	69	W
56	February 19	6–3	Buffalo Sabres	Biron	19,642	31–16–9	71	W
57	February 21	4–5	Pittsburgh Penguins	Biron	19,992	31–17–9	71	L
58	February 24	4–2	@ Washington Capitals	Biron	18,277	32–17–9	73	W
59	February 25	2–0	Los Angeles Kings	Biron	19,568	33–17–9	75	W
60	February 27	3–4 OT	Montreal Canadiens	Niittymaki	19,881	33–17–10	76	OTL

March: 8–7–0, 16 points (home: 4–4–0; road: 4–3–0)

Game	Date	Score	Opponent	Decision	Attendance	Record	Points	Recap
61	March 1	0–3	@ New Jersey Devils	Biron	17,625	33–18–10	76	L
62	March 3	4–2	@ Boston Bruins	Niittymaki	17,020	34–18–10	78	W
63	March 5	1–5	Calgary Flames	Niittymaki	19,513	34–19–10	78	L
64	March 7	4–1	Nashville Predators	Biron	19,611	35–19–10	80	W
65	March 10	5–2	Buffalo Sabres	Biron	19,421	36–19–10	82	W
66	March 12	1–2	Washington Capitals	Biron	19,728	36–20–10	82	L
67	March 14	4–2	New York Rangers	Biron	19,836	37–20–10	84	W
68	March 15	1–4	@ New York Rangers	Niittymaki	18,200	37–21–10	84	L
69	March 17	2–3	@ Detroit Red Wings	Biron	20,066	37–22–10	84	L
70	March 20	6–4	@ Buffalo Sabres	Biron	18,690	38–22–10	86	W
71	March 22	3–1	@ Pittsburgh Penguins	Biron	17,132	39–22–10	88	W
72	March 23	4–2	New Jersey Devils	Biron	19,762	40–22–10	90	W
73	March 26	2–4	Florida Panthers	Biron	19,631	40–23–10	90	L
74	March 28	4–3 SO	@ New York Islanders	Biron	16,234	41–23–10	92	W
75	March 29	3–4	Boston Bruins	Niittymaki	19,715	41–24–10	92	L

April: 3–3–1, 7 points (home: 2–1–0; road: 1–2–1)

Game	Date	Score	Opponent	Decision	Attendance	Record	Points	Recap
76	April 1	2–3	@ Toronto Maple Leafs	Biron	19,340	41–25–10	92	L
77	April 3	8–5	Toronto Maple Leafs	Biron	19,727	42–25–10	94	W
78	April 4	3–4 SO	@ Ottawa Senators	Niittymaki	19,557	42–25–11	95	OTL
79	April 7	2–1	Florida Panthers	Biron	19,637	43–25–11	97	W
80	April 9	1–2	@ New York Rangers	Biron	18,200	43–26–11	97	L
81	April 11	3–2	@ New York Islanders	Biron	16,234	44–26–11	99	W
82	April 12	3–4	New York Rangers	Biron	19,648	44–27–11	99	L

Legend: W Win (2 points) L Loss (0 points) OTL Overtime/shootout loss (1 point)

=== Playoffs ===
2009 Stanley Cup playoffs
Eastern Conference quarterfinals vs. Pittsburgh Penguins – Penguins win 4–2

Game	Date	Score	Opponent	Decision	Attendance	Series	Recap
1	April 15	1–4	@ Pittsburgh Penguins	Biron	17,132	Penguins lead 1–0	L
2	April 17	2–3 OT	@ Pittsburgh Penguins	Biron	17,132	Penguins lead 2–0	L
3	April 19	6–3	Pittsburgh Penguins	Biron	19,745	Penguins lead 2–1	W
4	April 21	1–3	Pittsburgh Penguins	Biron	19,883	Penguins lead 3–1	L
5	April 23	3–0	@ Pittsburgh Penguins	Biron	17,132	Penguins lead 3–2	W
6	April 25	3–5	Pittsburgh Penguins	Biron	20,072	Penguins win 4–2	L

Legend: W Win L Loss

== Player statistics ==
=== Scoring ===
- Position abbreviations: C = Center; D = Defense; G = Goaltender; LW = Left wing; RW = Right wing
- † = Joined team via a transaction (e.g., trade, waivers, signing) during the season. Stats reflect time with the Flyers only.
- ‡ = Left team via a transaction (e.g., trade, waivers, release) during the season. Stats reflect time with the Flyers only.

No.	Player	Pos	Regular season						Playoffs					
No.	Player	Pos	GP	G	A	Pts	+/-	PIM	GP	G	A	Pts	+/-	PIM
17	Jeff Carter	C	82	46	38	84	23	68	6	1	0	1	−2	8
18	Mike Richards	C	79	30	50	80	22	63	6	1	4	5	−4	6
12	Simon Gagne	LW	79	34	40	74	21	42	6	3	1	4	−4	2
19	Scott Hartnell	LW	82	30	30	60	14	143	6	1	1	2	−2	23
15	Joffrey Lupul	RW	79	25	25	50	1	58	6	1	1	2	1	2
22	Mike Knuble	RW	82	27	20	47	5	62	6	2	1	3	−2	2
44	Kimmo Timonen	D	77	3	40	43	19	54	6	0	1	1	−3	12
5	Braydon Coburn	D	80	7	21	28	7	97	6	0	3	3	2	7
28	Claude Giroux	RW	42	9	18	27	10	14	6	2	3	5	2	6
48	Danny Briere	C	29	11	14	25	−1	26	6	1	3	4	−1	8
25	Matt Carle†	D	64	4	20	24	2	16	6	0	3	3	0	4
9	Scottie Upshall‡	RW	55	7	14	21	5	63	—	—	—	—	—	—
45	Arron Asham	RW	78	8	12	20	0	155	6	1	1	2	−1	6
13	Glen Metropolit‡	C	55	4	10	14	−1	15	—	—	—	—	—	—
41	Andrew Alberts†	D	79	1	12	13	6	61	6	0	1	1	1	10
36	Darroll Powe	C	60	6	5	11	−8	35	6	1	2	3	0	7
23	Ossi Vaananen‡	D	46	1	9	10	7	22	—	—	—	—	—	—
6	Randy Jones	D	47	4	4	8	8	22	6	0	1	1	1	0
47	Luca Sbisa	D	39	0	7	7	−6	36	1	0	0	0	0	2
14	Andreas Nodl	RW	38	1	3	4	−15	2	—	—	—	—	—	—
43	Martin Biron	G	55	0	4	4		0	6	0	0	0		0
13	Daniel Carcillo†	LW	20	0	4	4	−2	80	5	1	1	2	3	5
77	Ryan Parent	D	31	0	4	4	3	10	6	0	0	0	−3	6
24	Josh Gratton†	LW	19	1	2	3	−2	57	—	—	—	—	—	—
46	Jon Kalinski	C	12	1	2	3	−2	0	—	—	—	—	—	—
32	Riley Cote	LW	63	0	3	3	−7	174	—	—	—	—	—	—
26	Steve Eminger‡	D	12	0	2	2	0	8	—	—	—	—	—	—
3	Lasse Kukkonen	D	22	0	2	2	−2	10	—	—	—	—	—	—
30	Antero Niittymaki	G	32	0	1	1		2	—	—	—	—	—	—
27	Steve Downie‡	RW	6	0	0	0	−4	11	—	—	—	—	—	—
51	Jamie Fritsch†	D	1	0	0	0	1	0	—	—	—	—	—	—
29	Nate Guenin	D	1	0	0	0	0	0	—	—	—	—	—	—
11	Boyd Kane	LW	1	0	0	0	0	0	—	—	—	—	—	—
60	Nate Raduns	C	1	0	0	0	0	0	—	—	—	—	—	—
42	Jared Ross	C	10	0	0	0	−4	2	6	1	0	1	0	0
40	David Sloane†	D	1	0	0	0	0	0	—	—	—	—	—	—
26	Danny Syvret	D	2	0	0	0	−1	0	—	—	—	—	—	—

=== Goaltending ===
No.	Player	Regular season											Playoffs									
No.	Player	GP	GS	W	L	OT	SA	GA	GAA	SV%	SO	TOI	GP	GS	W	L	SA	GA	GAA	SV%	SO	TOI
43	Martin Biron	55	53	29	19	5	1718	146	2.76	.915	2	3,177	6	6	2	4	198	16	2.56	.919	1	375
30	Antero Niittymaki	32	29	15	8	6	947	83	2.76	.912	1	1,805	—	—	—	—	—	—	—	—	—	—

== Awards and records ==
=== Awards ===
Type	Award/honor	Recipient	Ref
League (in-season)	NHL 2nd Star of the Month	Jeff Carter (December)	
League (in-season)	NHL 1st Star of the Week	Mike Richards (February 23)	
League (in-season)	NHL 2nd Star of the Week	Jeff Carter (December 22)	
League (in-season)	NHL 3rd Star of the Week	Simon Gagne (November 3)	
League (in-season)	NHL All-Star Game selection	Jeff Carter	
Team	Barry Ashbee Trophy	Kimmo Timonen	
Team	Bobby Clarke Trophy	Mike Richards	
Team	Gene Hart Memorial Award	Scott Hartnell	
Team	Pelle Lindbergh Memorial Trophy	Darroll Powe	
Team	Toyota Cup	Jeff Carter	
Team	Yanick Dupre Memorial Class Guy Award	Danny Briere	

=== Records ===
Among the team records set during the 2008–09 season was Simon Gagne tying the team record for most shorthanded goals in a single game on November 13. On December 20, Scott Hartnell tied the team record with three goals scored in a single period. On the season, Mike Richards tied the team record for most shorthanded goals (7) and Jeff Carter tied the mark for most game-winning goals (12). The one shorthanded goal allowed by the Flyers during the season is the fewest in franchise history.

=== Milestones ===
Milestone	Player	Date	Ref
First game	Jared Ross	October 11, 2008	
First game	Luca Sbisa	October 11, 2008	
First game	Andreas Nodl	October 22, 2008	
First game	Darroll Powe	October 24, 2008	
First game	Nate Raduns	November 6, 2008	
First game	Jon Kalinski	November 21, 2008	
First game	David Sloane	April 9, 2009	
First game	Jamie Fritsch	April 12, 2009	
25th shutout	Martin Biron	February 25, 2009	

== Transactions ==
The Flyers were involved in the following transactions from June 5, 2008, the day after the deciding game of the 2008 Stanley Cup Final, through June 12, 2009, the day of the deciding game of the 2009 Stanley Cup Final.

=== Trades ===
Date	Details		Ref
June 6, 2008	To Philadelphia Flyers: Danny Syvret	To Edmonton Oilers: Ryan Potulny	
June 18, 2008	To Philadelphia Flyers: 7th-round pick (196th overall) in 2008; Conditional 4th-round pick in 2009 (Note: The Flyers would receive the fourth-round pick if the Lightning re-signed Prospal, which they did on June 30.)	To Tampa Bay Lightning: Rights to Vaclav Prospal	
June 20, 2008	To Philadelphia Flyers: 1st-round pick (19th overall) in 2008; 3rd-round pick (67th overall) in 2008	To Columbus Blue Jackets: R. J. Umberger; 4th-round pick (118th overall) in 2008	
June 20, 2008	To Philadelphia Flyers: Steve Eminger; 3rd-round pick (84th overall) in 2008	To Washington Capitals: 1st-round pick (27th overall) in 2008	
June 21, 2008	To Philadelphia Flyers: 7th-round pick in 2009	To Anaheim Ducks: 7th-round pick (208th overall) in 2008	
June 24, 2008	To Philadelphia Flyers: Janne Niskala	To Nashville Predators: Triston Grant; 7th-round pick in 2009	
June 30, 2008	To Philadelphia Flyers: Tim Ramholt	To Calgary Flames: Kyle Greentree	
June 30, 2008	To Philadelphia Flyers: 6th-round pick in 2009	To Tampa Bay Lightning: Janne Niskala	
July 1, 2008	To Philadelphia Flyers: Patrik Hersley; Ned Lukacevic	To Los Angeles Kings: Denis Gauthier; 2nd-round pick in 2010	
October 13, 2008	To Philadelphia Flyers: Andrew Alberts	To Boston Bruins: Ned Lukacevic; Conditional 3rd- or 4th-round pick in 2009 (Note: The Bruins would have received a third-round pick instead of a fourth-round pick if Alberts re-signed with the Flyers after the 2008–09 season. The Flyers did not re-sign Alberts and the draft pick remained a fourth-rounder.)	
October 30, 2008	To Philadelphia Flyers: Josh Gratton	To Nashville Predators: Tim Ramholt	
November 7, 2008	To Philadelphia Flyers: Matt Carle; 3rd-round pick in 2009	To Tampa Bay Lightning: Steve Downie; Steve Eminger; 4th-round pick in 2009	
March 4, 2009	To Philadelphia Flyers: Daniel Carcillo	To Phoenix Coyotes: Scottie Upshall; 2nd-round pick in 2011	
March 4, 2009	To Philadelphia Flyers: Kyle McLaren (Note: The trade was nullified after McLaren failed his physical.)	To San Jose Sharks: 6th-round pick in 2009	

=== Players acquired ===
Date	Player	Former team	Term	Via	Ref
July 1, 2008	Sean Curry	Providence Bruins (AHL)	2-year	Free agency	
July 1, 2008	Glen Metropolit	Boston Bruins	2-year	Free agency	
July 1, 2008	Nate Raduns	Worcester Sharks (AHL)	1-year	Free agency	
July 1, 2008	Ossi Vaananen	Djurgardens IF (SHL)	1-year	Free agency	
July 7, 2008	Arron Asham	New Jersey Devils	2-year	Free agency	
September 18, 2008	Jean-Sebastien Aubin	Anaheim Ducks	1-year	Free agency	
March 26, 2009	Johan Backlund	Timra IK (SHL)	1-year	Free agency	
June 10, 2009	Ray Emery	Atlant Moscow Oblast (KHL)	1-year	Free agency	

=== Players lost ===
Date	Player	New team	Via (Note: In parentheses is the player's free agency group on July 1 if applicable.)	Ref
July 3, 2008	Rory Fitzpatrick	Florida Panthers	Free agency (III)	
July 3, 2008	Stefan Ruzicka	HC Spartak Moscow (KHL)	Free agency (II) (Note: Philadelphia retained Ruzicka's NHL rights through the 2011–12 season.)	
July 8, 2008	Jason Smith	Ottawa Senators	Free agency (III)	
July 14, 2008	Patrick Thoresen	HC Lugano (NLA)	Free agency (II) (Note: Philadelphia retained Thoresen's NHL rights through the 2010–11 season.)	
July 25, 2008	Martin Grenier	Traktor Chelyabinsk (KHL)	Free agency (III)	
July 31, 2008	Jaroslav Modry	HC Liberec (ELH)	Free agency (III)	
August 21, 2008	Rejean Beauchemin	Idaho Steelheads (ECHL)	Free agency (UFA)	
August 28, 2008	Darren Reid	Hershey Bears (AHL)	Free agency (VI)	
October 8, 2008	Jesse Boulerice	Lake Erie Monsters (AHL)	Free agency (III)	
October 22, 2008	Martin Houle	Las Vegas Wranglers (ECHL)	Free agency (UFA)	
November 17, 2008	Frederik Cabana		Release	
February 27, 2009	Glen Metropolit	Montreal Canadiens	Waivers	
February 27, 2009	Ossi Vaananen	Vancouver Canucks	Waivers	
April 7, 2009	Jim Dowd		Retirement (III)	

=== Signings ===
Date	Player	Term	Contract type	Ref
June 26, 2008	Jeff Carter	3-year	Re-signing	
June 29, 2008	Steve Eminger	1-year	Re-signing	
July 2, 2008	Riley Cote	3-year	Re-signing	
July 2, 2008	Randy Jones	2-year	Re-signing	
July 2, 2008	Danny Syvret	1-year	Re-signing	
July 15, 2008	Nate Guenin	1-year	Re-signing	
July 21, 2008	Joffrey Lupul	4-year	Extension	
July 22, 2008	Kevin Marshall	3-year	Entry-level	
August 7, 2008	Chris Zarb		Entry-level	
N/A	Scott Munroe	1-year	Re-signing	
October 1, 2008	Luca Sbisa	3-year	Entry-level	
April 1, 2009	James van Riemsdyk	3-year	Entry-level	

== Draft picks ==
Philadelphia's picks at the 2008 NHL entry draft, which was held at Scotiabank Place in Ottawa, Ontario on June 20–21, 2008. The Flyers traded their originally allotted second, third, fifth, and seventh-round picks in four separate trades.

Round	Pick	Player	Position	Nationality	Team (league)	Notes
1	19	Luca Sbisa	Defense	Switzerland	Lethbridge Hurricanes (WHL)	(Note: The Flyers traded R. J. Umberger and their fourth-round pick, 118th overall, to the Columbus Blue Jackets for the Colorado Avalanche's first-round pick, 19th overall, and the Blue Jackets' third-round pick, 67th overall, on June 20, 2008.)
3	67	Marc-Andre Bourdon	Defense	Canada	Rouyn-Noranda Huskies (QMJHL)	
3	84	Jacob DeSerres	Goaltender	Canada	Seattle Thunderbirds (WHL)	(Note: The Flyers traded their first-round pick, 27th overall, to the Washington Capitals for Steve Eminger and the Capitals' third-round pick, 84th overall, on June 20, 2008.)
6	178	Zac Rinaldo	Center	Canada	Mississauga St. Michael's Majors (OHL)	
7	196	Joacim Eriksson	Goaltender	Sweden	Brynas IF (Elitserien)	(Note: The Flyers traded Vaclav Prospal to the Tampa Bay Lightning for the Nashville Predators' seventh-round pick, 196th overall, and a conditional 2009 fourth-round pick (if Lightning re-sign Prospal) on June 18, 2008.)

== Farm teams ==
American Hockey League – Philadelphia Phantoms (Standings)

The 2008–09 season was the Phantoms' last playing in the Wachovia Spectrum and means they will move following the season. Comcast Spectacor sold the Phantoms to the Brooks Group of Pittsburgh on February 4, 2009, and the new ownership has expressed interest in eventually moving the Phantoms to Allentown provided that a multi-purpose arena can be constructed there. Until a permanent new home is found for the club it will have to operate starting in 2009–10 in a temporary location. The site being given the most serious consideration for that is Glen Falls, the former home of the AHL Adirondack Red Wings from 1979 to 1999. Comcast Spectacor continued to operate the team through the conclusion of the 2008–09 AHL season and playoffs.

With Craig Berube returning to his role as an assistant coach with the Flyers, John Paddock was named head coach of the Phantoms. The Phantoms trailed the Binghamton Senators by as many as 12 points on March 14 for the final playoff spot in the East Division, but came back to overtake Binghamton and clinch the final playoff spot in the final regular season game at the Spectrum. The Phantoms' final season in Philadelphia came to an end after being swept from the first round of the playoffs by the Hershey Bears.

ECHL – Mississippi Sea Wolves (Standings)

Mississippi missed the ECHL playoffs and announced they would suspend operations for the 2009–10 season.
