= 2008–09 Florida Panthers season =

National Hockey League team season

2008–09 Florida Panthers
- Division: 3rd Southeast
- Conference: 9th Eastern
- 2008–09 record: 41–30–11
- Home record: 22–12–7
- Road record: 19–18–4
- Goals for: 234
- Goals against: 231

Team information
- General manager: Jacques Martin
- Coach: Peter DeBoer
- Captain: Vacant
- Alternate captains: Bryan Allen; Bryan McCabe; Cory Stillman; Stephen Weiss
- Arena: BankAtlantic Center
- Average attendance: 15,531

Team leaders
- Goals: David Booth (31)
- Assists: Stephen Weiss (47)
- Points: Stephen Weiss (61)
- Penalty minutes: Nick Boynton (91)
- Plus/minus: Stephen Weiss (+19)
- Wins: Tomas Vokoun (26)
- Goals against average: Tomas Vokoun (2.49)

The 2008–09 Florida Panthers season was the 15th season for the franchise in the National Hockey League (NHL). The 2008–09 season was also the eighth consecutive season in which the Panthers did not make the Stanley Cup playoffs for the first time in franchise history, finishing level on points with the qualifying Montreal Canadiens, but suffering from an inferior head-to-head record (1–3), the decisive tiebreaker.

On June 14, 2008, the Panthers named Peter DeBoer head coach and signed him to a multi-year contract. Former head coach Jacques Martin had resigned from the position but retained his position as general manager.

== Preseason ==
The Florida Panthers played seven preseason exhibition games before the start of the regular season. The team went on a road trip across North America to play six games on six consecutive nights, winning only the first two games. The trip included the first-ever NHL game played on Prince Edward Island, against the New York Islanders. After one final preseason game at home, the Panthers finished the preseason with a 3–2–2 record.

== Regular season ==
=== Divisional standings ===
Southeast Division
		GP	W	L	OTL	GF	GA	Pts
**1**	**y – Washington Capitals**	**82**	**50**	**24**	**8**	**272**	**245**	**108**
**2**	**Carolina Hurricanes**	**82**	**45**	**30**	**7**	**239**	**226**	**97**
3	Florida Panthers	82	41	30	11	234	231	93
4	Atlanta Thrashers	82	35	41	6	257	280	76
5	Tampa Bay Lightning	82	24	40	18	210	279	66

=== Conference standings ===
Eastern Conference
R		Div	GP	W	L	OTL	GF	GA	Pts
**1**	**z – Boston Bruins**	**NE**	**82**	**53**	**19**	**10**	**274**	**196**	116
**2**	**y – Washington Capitals**	**SE**	**82**	**50**	**24**	**8**	**272**	**245**	108
**3**	**y – New Jersey Devils**	**AT**	**82**	**51**	**27**	**4**	**244**	**209**	106
**4**	**Pittsburgh Penguins**	**AT**	**82**	**45**	**28**	**9**	**264**	**239**	99
**5**	**Philadelphia Flyers**	**AT**	**82**	**44**	**27**	**11**	**264**	**238**	99
**6**	**Carolina Hurricanes**	**SE**	**82**	**45**	**30**	**7**	**239**	**226**	97
**7**	**New York Rangers**	**AT**	**82**	**43**	**30**	**9**	**210**	**218**	95
**8**	**Montreal Canadiens**	**NE**	**82**	**41**	**30**	**11**	**249**	**247**	93
8.5
9	Florida Panthers	SE	82	41	30	11	234	231	93
10	Buffalo Sabres	NE	82	41	32	9	250	234	91
11	Ottawa Senators	NE	82	36	35	11	217	237	83
12	Toronto Maple Leafs	NE	82	34	35	13	250	293	81
13	Atlanta Thrashers	SE	82	35	41	6	257	280	76
14	Tampa Bay Lightning	SE	82	24	40	18	210	279	66
15	New York Islanders	AT	82	26	47	9	201	279	61

bold – qualified for playoffs, y – division winner, z – placed first in conference (and division)

AT – Atlantic Division, NE – Northeast Division, SE – Southeast Division

== Schedule and results ==
2008–09 Game Log

October: 4–5–0 (Home: 3–2–0; Road: 1–3–0)
#	Date	Visitor	Score	Home	OT	Decision	Attendance	Record	Pts
1	October 10	Florida	4 - 6	Carolina		Vokoun	18,680	0-1-0	0
2	October 11	Atlanta	2 - 3	Florida	OT	Vokoun	18,401	1-1-0	2
3	October 16	Minnesota	6 - 2	Florida		Vokoun	12,106	1-2-0	2
4	October 18	NY Islanders	0 - 2	Florida		Vokoun	16,087	2-2-0	4
5	October 20	Florida	1 - 3	Montreal		Vokoun	21,273	2-3-0	4
6	October 22	Florida	3 - 1	Ottawa		Anderson	18,952	3-3-0	6
7	October 24	San Jose	3 - 4	Florida		Vokoun	15,232	4-3-0	8
8	October 25	Florida	0 - 4	St. Louis		Anderson	19,150	4-4-0	8
9	October 30	Ottawa	2 - 1	Florida		Vokoun	13,567	4-5-0	8

November: 5–6–3 (Home: 2–1–2; Road: 3–5–1)
#	Date	Visitor	Score	Home	OT	Decision	Attendance	Record	Pts
10	November 1	Florida	2 - 3	Nashville	SO	Anderson	14,909	4-5-1	9
11	November 2	Florida	3 - 5	Atlanta		Vokoun	10,584	4-6-1	9
12	November 6	Florida	2 - 3	Los Angeles		Vokoun	11,267	4-7-1	9
13	November 8	Florida	1 - 4	Phoenix		Vokoun	14,807	4-8-1	9
14	November 9	Florida	3 - 1	Anaheim		Anderson	16,951	5-8-1	11
15	November 12	Tampa Bay	0 - 4	Florida		Anderson	12,104	6-8-1	13
16	November 14	Detroit	3 - 2	Florida		Vokoun	18,637	6-9-1	13
17	November 18	Florida	4 - 3	Tampa Bay	SO	Vokoun	16,176	7-9-1	15
18	November 20	Florida	1 - 3	New Jersey		Vokoun	14,291	7-10-1	15
19	November 21	Florida	2 - 4	Boston		Vokoun	16,878	7-11-1	15
20	November 24	Carolina	2 - 3	Florida		Vokoun	11,117	8-11-1	17
21	November 26	New Jersey	3 - 2	Florida	OT	Anderson	14,932	8-11-2	18
22	November 28	NY Rangers	4 - 3	Florida	SO	Anderson	18,106	8-11-3	19
23	November 30	Florida	4 - 0	NY Rangers		Anderson	18,200	9-11-3	21

December: 7–5–2 (Home: 3–2–1; Road: 4–3–1)
#	Date	Visitor	Score	Home	OT	Decision	Attendance	Record	Pts
24	December 2	Florida	5 - 3	Washington		Anderson	16,792	10-11-3	23
25	December 4	Buffalo	1 - 2	Florida		Anderson	13,123	11-11-3	25
26	December 6	Boston	4 - 0	Florida		Anderson	16,213	11-12-3	25
27	December 8	Florida	4 - 3	Ottawa	OT	Anderson	17,947	12-12-3	27
28	December 11	Florida	2 - 0	Edmonton		Anderson	16,839	13-12-3	29
29	December 12	Florida	3 - 2	Calgary	SO	Vokoun	19,289	14-12-3	31
30	December 14	Florida	3 - 5	Vancouver		Anderson	18,630	14-13-3	31
31	December 18	Florida	1 - 2	Carolina	OT	Vokoun	14,533	14-13-4	32
32	December 21	Colorado	0 - 3	Florida		Vokoun	16,132	15-13-4	34
33	December 23	Nashville	0 - 3	Florida		Vokoun	14,703	16-13-4	36
34	December 26	Tampa Bay	4 - 3	Florida	SO	Vokoun	16,961	16-13-5	37
35	December 27	Florida	4 - 6	Tampa Bay		Vokoun	18,226	16-14-5	37
36	December 29	Montreal	5 - 2	Florida		Anderson	20,741	16-15-5	37
37	December 31	Florida	2 - 4	NY Islanders		Vokoun	12,211	16-16-5	37

January: 7–2–3 (Home: 4–1–2; Road: 3–1–1)
#	Date	Visitor	Score	Home	OT	Decision	Attendance	Record	Pts
38	January 3	Florida	6 - 1	Pittsburgh		Anderson	17,042	17-16-5	39
39	January 4	Florida	5 - 6	Montreal	SO	Anderson	21,273	17-16-6	40
40	January 6	Florida	4 - 2	Toronto		Vokoun	19,197	18-16-6	42
41	January 8	Carolina	2 - 4	Florida		Vokoun	10,323	19-16-6	44
42	January 10	Atlanta	4 - 8	Florida		Vokoun	14,323	20-16-6	46
43	January 16	Philadelphia	3 - 2	Florida	SO	Vokoun	17,827	20-16-7	47
44	January 17	Florida	4 - 3	Tampa Bay		Vokoun	17,217	21-16-7	49
45	January 19	Buffalo	3 - 2	Florida	SO	Vokoun	12,480	21-16-8	50
46	January 21	Dallas	4 - 1	Florida		Vokoun	11,200	21-17-8	50
47	January 27	Philadelphia	2 - 3	Florida		Vokoun	13,904	22-17-8	52
48	January 29	Montreal	1 - 5	Florida		Vokoun	16,334	23-17-8	54
49	January 31	Florida	1 - 3	NY Islanders		Vokoun	13,336	23-18-8	54

February: 8–5–0 (Home: 5–2–0; Road: 3–3–0)
#	Date	Visitor	Score	Home	OT	Decision	Attendance	Record	Pts
50	February 3	Florida	4 - 3	Toronto	OT	Anderson	19,095	24-18-8	56
51	February 5	NY Islanders	2 - 3	Florida		Vokoun	14,206	25-18-8	58
52	February 7	Florida	1 - 3	Washington		Vokoun	18,277	25-19-8	58
53	February 10	Toronto	4 - 5	Florida	OT	Vokoun	13,764	26-19-8	60
54	February 12	Florida	5 - 0	Carolina		Vokoun	18,680	27-19-8	62
55	February 13	NY Rangers	1 - 2	Florida	SO	Vokoun	17,042	28-19-8	64
56	February 15	Washington	4 - 2	Florida		Vokoun	17,279	28-20-8	64
57	February 17	New Jersey	0 - 4	Florida		Vokoun	14,514	29-20-8	66
58	February 19	Chicago	4 - 0	Florida		Vokoun	16,133	29-21-8	66
59	February 21	Boston	0 - 2	Florida		Vokoun	19,343	30-21-8	68
60	February 24	Florida	1 - 6	Boston		Anderson	16,781	30-22-8	68
61	February 26	Florida	2 - 1	NY Rangers		Anderson	18,200	31-22-8	70
62	February 28	Florida	2 - 7	New Jersey		Anderson	16,256	31-23-8	70

March: 7–5–3 (Home: 3–3–2; Road: 4–2–1)
#	Date	Visitor	Score	Home	OT	Decision	Attendance	Record	Pts
63	March 1	Florida	6 - 2	Washington		Anderson	18,277	32-23-8	72
64	March 3	Florida	4 - 3	Atlanta		Vokoun	10,329	33-23-8	74
65	March 5	Pittsburgh	4 - 1	Florida		Vokoun	18,933	33-24-8	74
66	March 7	St. Louis	3 - 5	Florida		Vokoun	17,591	34-24-8	76
67	March 10	Florida	3 - 4	Pittsburgh	SO	Vokoun	17,132	34-24-9	77
68	March 12	Florida	1 - 3	Buffalo		Vokoun	18,690	34-25-9	77
69	March 14	Tampa Bay	4 - 3	Florida	SO	Vokoun	17,734	34-25-10	78
70	March 17	Washington	3 - 0	Florida		Vokoun	14,650	34-26-10	78
71	March 19	Toronto	1 - 3	Florida		Vokoun	15,467	35-26-10	80
72	March 21	Columbus	3 - 1	Florida		Vokoun	17,032	35-27-10	80
73	March 23	Carolina	3 - 2	Florida	OT	Vokoun	14,304	35-27-11	81
74	March 25	Florida	3 - 5	Buffalo		Vokoun	18,690	35-28-11	81
75	March 26	Florida	4 - 2	Philadelphia		Anderson	19,631	36-28-11	83
76	March 28	Florida	6 - 3	Dallas		Anderson	18,532	37-28-11	85
77	March 31	Ottawa	2 - 5	Florida		Anderson	15,247	38-28-11	87

April: 3–2–0 (Home: 2–1–0; Road: 1–1–0)
#	Date	Visitor	Score	Home	OT	Decision	Attendance	Record	Pts
78	April 3	Atlanta	3 - 1	Florida		Anderson	15,945	38-29-11	87
79	April 5	Pittsburgh	2 - 4	Florida		Vokoun	18,232	39-29-11	89
80	April 7	Florida	1 - 2	Philadelphia		Vokoun	19,637	39-30-11	89
81	April 9	Florida	3 - 2	Atlanta		Vokoun	15,738	40-30-11	91
82	April 11	Washington	4 - 7	Florida		Vokoun	18,527	41-30-11	93

Legend: Win (2 points) Loss (0 points) Overtime/shootout loss (1 point)

== Playoffs ==
The Panthers failed to make the playoffs for the eighth consecutive season. They last made the playoffs in 2000.

== Player statistics ==
=== Skaters ===
Regular season

Player	GP	G	A	Pts	+/−	PIM
Stephen Weiss	78	14	47	61	+18	22
David Booth	72	31	29	60	+10	38
Cory Stillman	63	17	32	49	+1	37
Nathan Horton	67	22	23	45	-5	48
Michael Frolik	79	21	24	45	+9	22
Jay Bouwmeester	82	15	27	42	-2	68
Bryan McCabe	69	15	24	39	-1	41
Radek Dvorak	81	15	21	36	0	42
Keith Ballard	82	6	28	34	+14	72
Richard Zednik	70	17	16	33	+2	46
Gregory Campbell	77	13	19	32	0	76
Ville Peltonen	79	12	19	31	+6	31
Nick Boynton	68	5	16	21	+7	91
Brett McLean	80	7	12	19	-11	29
Kamil Kreps	66	4	15	19	+3	18
Karlis Skrastins	80	4	14	18	+9	30
Jassen Cullimore	68	2	8	10	-10	37
Rostislav Olesz	37	4	5	9	-5	8
Anthony Stewart	59	2	5	7	-6	34
Nick Tarnasky^{†}	34	1	5	6	-2	33
Noah Welch^{‡}	23	1	1	2	-5	11
Shawn Matthias	16	0	2	2	-3	2
Michal Repik	5	2	0	2	+1	2
Bryan Allen	2	0	1	1	+2	0
Steve Eminger^{†}	9	1	0	1	+1	6
Cory Murphy^{‡}	7	0	1	1	-1	2
Wade Belak^{‡}	15	0	0	0	0	25
Janis Sprukts	1	0	0	0	0	0
Kenndal McArdle	3	0	0	0	-1	2
Tanner Glass	3	0	0	0	0	7
Jason Garrison	1	0	0	0	0	0

=== Goaltenders ===
Regular season

Player	GP	Min	W	L	OT	GA	GAA	SA	SV	Sv%	SO
Tomas Vokoun	59	3324	26	23	6	138	2.49	1855	1717	.926	6
Craig Anderson	31	1635	15	7	5	74	2.71	977	903	.924	3

^{†}Denotes player spent time with another team before joining Panthers. Stats reflect time with Panthers only.
^{‡}Traded mid-season
Bold/italics denotes franchise record

Note:

Pos = Position;GP = Games played; G = Goals; A = Assists; Pts = Points; PIM = Penalty minutes; +/- = Plus/minus; PPG = Power-play goals; SHG = Short-handed goals; GWG = Game-winning goals
Pos = Position;GP = Games played; Min, TOI = Minutes played; W = Wins; L = Losses; T,T/OT = Ties; OTL = Overtime losses; GA = Goals-against; GAA = Goals-against average; SO = Shutouts; SA = Shots against; SV = Shots saved;SV% = Save percentage;

== Awards and records ==
=== Milestones ===
Regular Season
Player	Milestone	Reached
Jason Garrison	1st NHL Game	October 25, 2008
Jay Bouwmeester	400th NHL Game	November 2, 2008
Kamil Kreps	100th NHL Game	November 2, 2008
Tomas Vokoun	500th NHL Game	March 7, 2009

== Transactions ==
=== Trades ===
June 20, 2008	To Florida Panthers Nick Boynton; Keith Ballard; 2nd-round pick in 2008 – Jared Staal	To Phoenix Coyotes Olli Jokinen
September 2, 2008	To Florida Panthers Bryan McCabe; 4th round pick in 2009	To Toronto Maple Leafs Mike Van Ryn
November 27, 2008	To Florida Panthers Nick Tarnasky	To Nashville Predators Wade Belak
March 4, 2009	To Florida Panthers Steve Eminger	To Tampa Bay Lightning Noah Welch; 3rd-round pick in 2009 – Andrej Nestrasil

=== Free agents ===
Player / Former team / Contract Terms	Player / New team

=== Claimed from waivers ===
Player	Former team	Date claimed off waivers

== Draft picks ==
Florida's picks at the 2008 NHL entry draft in Ottawa • Ontario.

Round	#	Player	Position	Nationality	College/Junior/Club team (League)
2	31 (from Tampa Bay)	Jacob Markstrom	(G)	Sweden	Brynäs IF (Sweden Jr.)
2	46 (Nashville via Phoenix)	Colby Robak	(D)	Canada	Brandon Wheat Kings (WHL)
3	80 (from Colorado)	Adam Comrie	(D)	Canada	Saginaw Spirit (OHL)
4	100	AJ Jenks	(LW)	United States	Plymouth Whalers (OHL)
7	190	Matthew Bartkowski	(D)	United States	Lincoln Stars (USHL)

== See also ==
- 2008–09 NHL season

== Farm teams ==
The Florida Panthers maintain affiliations with two minor league teams, the Rochester Americans and the Florida Everblades.
