= 2008–09 Carolina Hurricanes season =

National Hockey League team season

2008–09 Carolina Hurricanes
- Division: 2nd Southeast
- Conference: 6th Eastern
- 2008–09 record: 45–30–7
- Home record: 26–14–1
- Road record: 19–16–6
- Goals for: 239
- Goals against: 226

Team information
- General manager: Jim Rutherford
- Coach: Paul Maurice
- Captain: Rod Brind'Amour
- Alternate captains: Eric Staal; Ray Whitney
- Arena: RBC Center
- Average attendance: Average: 15,573 (83.4%); Total: 679,488

Team leaders
- Goals: Eric Staal (40)
- Assists: Ray Whitney (53)
- Points: Ray Whitney (77)
- Penalty minutes: Tuomo Ruutu (79)
- Plus/minus: Eric Staal (15)
- Wins: Cam Ward (39)
- Goals against average: Cam Ward (2.44)

The 2008–09 Carolina Hurricanes season was the franchise's 37th season, 30th season in the National Hockey League and 11th as the Hurricanes.

This was the last season the Hurricanes made the playoffs until 2019.

== Off-season ==
- June 5: After 20 seasons in the NHL and 13 as one of the most popular faces of the Hurricanes' franchise, Glen Wesley announced his retirement.
- September 11: The club announced that they have signed Eric Staal to a seven-year contract extension worth US$57.75 million.

== Regular season ==
- November 7: Peter Laviolette made NHL history by becoming the winningest American-born NHL coach with his 240th victory, as Carolina defeated the Ottawa Senators, 2–1.
- December 2: Peter Laviolette was fired as the head coach and Paul Maurice was rehired in his place. Ron Francis became the team's associate head coach.

The Hurricanes finished the regular season having tied the Montreal Canadiens for the most power-play opportunities, with 374.

=== Divisional standings ===
Southeast Division
		GP	W	L	OTL	GF	GA	Pts
**1**	**y – Washington Capitals**	**82**	**50**	**24**	**8**	**272**	**245**	**108**
**2**	**Carolina Hurricanes**	**82**	**45**	**30**	**7**	**239**	**226**	**97**
3	Florida Panthers	82	41	30	11	234	231	93
4	Atlanta Thrashers	82	35	41	6	257	280	76
5	Tampa Bay Lightning	82	24	40	18	210	279	66

2 points for a win, 1 for an OT or shootout loss, 0 for a loss in regulation

=== Conference standings ===
Eastern Conference
R		Div	GP	W	L	OTL	GF	GA	Pts
**1**	**z – Boston Bruins**	**NE**	**82**	**53**	**19**	**10**	**274**	**196**	116
**2**	**y – Washington Capitals**	**SE**	**82**	**50**	**24**	**8**	**272**	**245**	108
**3**	**y – New Jersey Devils**	**AT**	**82**	**51**	**27**	**4**	**244**	**209**	106
**4**	**Pittsburgh Penguins**	**AT**	**82**	**45**	**28**	**9**	**264**	**239**	99
**5**	**Philadelphia Flyers**	**AT**	**82**	**44**	**27**	**11**	**264**	**238**	99
**6**	**Carolina Hurricanes**	**SE**	**82**	**45**	**30**	**7**	**239**	**226**	97
**7**	**New York Rangers**	**AT**	**82**	**43**	**30**	**9**	**210**	**218**	95
**8**	**Montreal Canadiens**	**NE**	**82**	**41**	**30**	**11**	**249**	**247**	93
8.5
9	Florida Panthers	SE	82	41	30	11	234	231	93
10	Buffalo Sabres	NE	82	41	32	9	250	234	91
11	Ottawa Senators	NE	82	36	35	11	217	237	83
12	Toronto Maple Leafs	NE	82	34	35	13	250	293	81
13	Atlanta Thrashers	SE	82	35	41	6	257	280	76
14	Tampa Bay Lightning	SE	82	24	40	18	210	279	66
15	New York Islanders	AT	82	26	47	9	201	279	61

bold – qualified for playoffs, y – division winner, z – placed first in conference (and division)

AT – Atlantic Division, NE – Northeast Division, SE – Southeast Division

== Schedule and results ==
Win (2 points) Loss (0 points) Overtime/shootout loss (1 point)

2008–09 Game Log

Preseason: 3–3–0 (Home: 2–1–0; Road: 1–2–0)
**Date**	**Visitor**	**Score**	**Home**	**OT**	**Decision**	**Attendance**	**Record**	**Pts**
September 24	Washington	4 – 1	Hurricanes		Ward	11,431	0-1-0	0
September 25	Hurricanes	2 – 5	Washington		Manzato	13,266	0-2-0	0
September 27	Hurricanes	2 – 4	Philadelphia		Ward	17,700	0-3-0	0
September 28	Philadelphia	0 – 1	Hurricanes		Leighton	11,431	1-3-0	2
October 2	Hurricanes	4 – 2	Nashville		Ward	12,903	2-3-0	4
October 5	Nashville	0 – 2	Hurricanes		Ward	11,313	3-3-0	4

October: 5–2–2 (Home: 1–1–0; Road: 4–1–2)
#	**Date**	**Visitor**	**Score**	**Home**	**OT**	**Decision**	**Attendance**	**Record**	**Pts**
1	October 10	Florida	4 – 6	Hurricanes		Ward	18,680	1-0-0	2
2	October 11	Hurricanes	4 – 3	Lightning	OT	Leighton	18,552	2-0-0	4
3	October 13	Detroit	3 – 1	Hurricanes		Ward	18,680	2-1-0	4
4	October 17	Hurricanes	3 – 4	Los Angeles	OT	Ward	14,194	2-1-1	5
5	October 19	Hurricanes	3 – 1	Anaheim		Leighton	16,847	3-1-1	7
6	October 23	Hurricanes	1 – 4	Pittsburgh		Ward	17,132	3-2-1	7
7	October 25	Hurricanes	4 – 3	NY Islanders		Ward	11,219	4-2-1	9
8	October 28	Hurricanes	2 – 3	Montreal	SO	Ward	21,273	4-2-2	10
9	October 30	Hurricanes	1 – 0	St. Louis		Ward	17,860	5-2-2	12

November: 7–9–0 (Home: 5–6–0; Road: 2–3–0)
#	**Date**	**Visitor**	**Score**	**Home**	**OT**	**Decision**	**Attendance**	**Record**	**Pts**
10	November 1	Edmonton	3 – 1	Hurricanes		Ward	15,016	5-3-2	12
11	November 2	Toronto	4 – 6	Hurricanes		Leighton	15,635	6-3-2	14
12	November 4	Hurricanes	5 – 4	Toronto	OT	Ward	19,266	7-3-2	16
13	November 6	Hurricanes	2 – 3	Capitals		Ward	15,391	7-4-2	16
14	November 7	Ottawa	1 – 2	Hurricanes		Leighton	15,206	8-4-2	18
15	November 9	Atlanta	5 – 2	Hurricanes		Ward	12,398	8-5-2	18
16	November 12	Washington	5 – 1	Hurricanes		Leighton	14,261	8-6-2	18
17	November 14	Hurricanes	2 – 3	Atlanta		Ward	16,128	8-7-2	18
18	November 16	Tampa Bay	2 – 3	Hurricanes	SO	Ward	13,781	9-7-2	20
19	November 18	Montreal	1 – 2	Hurricanes		Ward	12,164	10-7-2	22
20	November 21	Coyotes	2 – 5	Hurricanes		Ward	14,848	11-7-2	24
21	November 23	Nashville	5 – 2	Hurricanes		Ward	13,042	11-8-2	24
22	November 24	Hurricanes	2 – 3	Panthers		Leighton	11,117	11-9-2	24
23	November 26	Philadelphia	3 – 1	Hurricanes		Ward	15,057	11-10-2	24
24	November 28	Hurricanes	3 – 2	Philadelphia	OT	Ward	19,587	12-10-2	26
25	November 30	Anaheim	4 – 1	Hurricanes		Leighton	14,191	12-11-2	26

December: 6–4–3 (Home: 4–2–1; Road: 2–2–2)
#	**Date**	**Visitor**	**Score**	**Home**	**OT**	**Decision**	**Attendance**	**Record**	**Pts**
26	December 4	Penguins	5 – 2	Hurricanes		Leighton	14,559	12-12-2	26
27	December 6	Philadelphia	2 – 1	Hurricanes	OT	Leighton	14,061	12-12-3	27
28	December 7	Washington	1 – 3	Hurricanes		Leighton	15,308	13-12-3	29
29	December 11	Hurricanes	5 – 6	Philadelphia	SO	Leighton	19,057	13-12-4	30
30	December 13	Hurricanes	2 – 3	NY Rangers	SO	Ward	18,200	13-12-5	31
31	December 16	Montreal	2 – 3	Hurricanes		Ward	16,434	14-12-5	33
32	December 18	Florida	1 – 2	Hurricanes	OT	Ward	14,533	15-12-5	35
33	December 20	Hurricanes	2 – 4	Boston		Ward	17,565	15-13-5	35
34	December 21	Hurricanes	3 – 2	Montreal	OT	Ward	21,273	16-13-5	37
35	December 23	Hurricanes	2 – 3	Minnesota		Leighton	18,568	16-14-5	37
36	December 26	Hurricanes	5 – 4	Atlanta		Ward	16,012	17-14-5	39
37	December 27	Boston	4 – 2	Hurricanes		Ward	16,705	17-15-5	39
38	December 31	Atlanta	1 – 3	Hurricanes		Ward	18,137	18-15-5	41

January: 7–6–0 (Home: 4–1–0; Road: 3–5–0)
#	**Date**	**Visitor**	**Score**	**Home**	**OT**	**Decision**	**Attendance**	**Record**	**Pts**
39	January 2	St. Louis	1 – 2	Hurricanes		Ward	17,092	19-15-5	43
40	January 3	Hurricanes	3 – 2	Tampa Bay		Ward	15,873	20-15-5	45
41	January 6	New Jersey	2 – 3	Hurricanes		Ward	15,399	21-15-5	47
42	January 8	Hurricanes	2 – 4	Florida		Ward	10,323	21-16-5	47
43	January 10	Hurricanes	1 – 5	Boston		Ward	17,565	21-17-5	47
44	January 13	Hurricanes	1 – 5	Ottawa		Ward	18,512	21-18-5	47
45	January 15	Toronto	6 – 4	Hurricanes		Ward	18,037	21-19-5	47
46	January 17	Hurricanes	1 – 3	Buffalo		Ward	18,690	21-20-5	47
47	January 19	Hurricanes	2 – 0	Toronto		Ward	19,018	22-20-5	49
48	January 20	Hurricanes	2 – 1	Pittsburgh		Ward	16,972	23-20-5	51
49	January 27	Hurricanes	2 – 3	NY Rangers		Ward	18,200	23-21-5	51
50	January 29	Tampa Bay	2 – 3	Hurricanes		Ward	16,405	24-21-5	53
51	January 31	Atlanta	0 – 2	Hurricanes		Ward	16,215	25-21-5	55

February: 7–6–0 (Home: 3–3–0; Road: 4–3–0)
#	**Date**	**Visitor**	**Score**	**Home**	**OT**	**Decision**	**Attendance**	**Record**	**Pts**
52	February 3	Hurricanes	3 – 4	Vancouver		Ward	18,630	25-22-5	55
53	February 5	Hurricanes	4 – 3	San Jose	SO	Leighton	17,496	26-22-5	57
54	February 7	Hurricanes	7 – 2	Phoenix		Ward	15,229	27-22-5	59
55	February 12	Florida	5 – 0	Hurricanes		Ward	18,680	27-23-5	59
56	February 14	Columbus	5 – 1	Hurricanes		Ward	18,680	27-24-5	59
57	February 15	Hurricanes	3 – 0	Buffalo		Ward	18,690	28-24-5	61
58	February 17	Boston	5 – 1	Hurricanes		Ward	18,680	28-25-5	61
59	February 19	Hurricanes	6 – 2	NY Islanders		Ward	11,802	29-25-5	63
60	February 20	Tampa Bay	1 – 4	Hurricanes		Ward	17,711	30-25-5	65
61	February 22	Colorado	2 – 5	Hurricanes		Ward	18,680	31-25-5	67
62	February 24	Hurricanes	2 – 4	Ottawa		Ward	16,541	31-26-5	67
63	February 26	Buffalo	1 – 2	Hurricanes	SO	Ward	18,219	32-26-5	69
64	February 28	Hurricanes	3 – 5	Atlanta		Ward	17,796	32-27-5	69

March: 10–1–2 (Home: 6–0–0; Road: 4–1–2)
#	**Date**	**Visitor**	**Score**	**Home**	**OT**	**Decision**	**Attendance**	**Record**	**Pts**
65	March 3	Hurricanes	5 – 2	Washington		Ward	17,903	33-27-5	71
66	March 6	Calgary	1 – 6	Hurricanes		Ward	18,108	34-27-5	73
67	March 7	Hurricanes	9 – 3	Tampa Bay		Ward	15,692	35-27-5	75
68	March 9	NY Rangers	0 – 3	Hurricanes		Ward	17,826	36-27-5	77
69	March 11	Hurricanes	2 – 3	Chicago	SO	Ward	21,513	36-27-6	78
70	March 12	Hurricanes	2 – 3	Dallas		Ward	16,788	36-28-6	78
71	March 14	Hurricanes	4 – 5	Washington	SO	Ward	18,277	36-28-7	79
72	March 18	New Jersey	2 – 4	Hurricanes		Ward	18,544	37-28-7	81
73	March 20	NY Islanders	4 – 5	Hurricanes		Ward	18,137	38-28-7	83
74	March 21	Washington	1 – 4	Hurricanes		Ward	18,680	39-28-7	85
75	March 23	Hurricanes	3 – 2	Florida		Ward	14,304	40-28-7	87
76	March 25	Ottawa	1 – 2	Hurricanes		Ward	17,146	41-28-7	89
77	March 28	Hurricanes	2 – 1	New Jersey		Ward	17,018	42-28-7	91

April: 3–2–0 (Home: 3–1–0; Road: 0–1–0)
#	**Date**	**Visitor**	**Score**	**Home**	**OT**	**Decision**	**Attendance**	**Record**	**Pts**
78	April 2	NY Rangers	2 – 4	Hurricanes		Ward	18,680	43-28-7	93
79	April 4	Pittsburgh	2 – 3	Hurricanes	OT	Ward	18,680	44-28-7	95
80	April 7	NY Islanders	0 – 9	Hurricanes		Ward	18,680	45-28-7	97
81	April 9	Buffalo	5 – 1	Hurricanes		Ward	18,513	45-29-7	97
82	April 11	Hurricanes	2 – 3	New Jersey		Ward	17,625	45-30-7	97

=== Record vs. opponents ===
Team	Points	Record
New Jersey*	106	3–1–0
NY Islanders	61	4–0–0
NY Rangers	95	2–1–1
Philadelphia	99	1–1–2
Pittsburgh	99	2–2–0
Boston*	116	0–4–0
Buffalo	91	2–2–0
Montreal	93	3–0–1
Ottawa	83	2–2–0
Toronto	81	3–1–0
**Atlanta**	76	3–3–0
**Florida**	93	3–3–0
**Tampa Bay**	66	6–0–0
**Washington***	108	3–2–1
Chicago	104	0–0–1
Columbus	92	0–1–0
Detroit*	112	1–0–0
Nashville	88	1–0–0
St. Louis	92	2–0–0
Calgary	98	1–0–0
Colorado	69	1–0–0
Edmonton	85	0–1–0
Minnesota	89	0–1–0
Vancouver*	100	0–1–0
Anaheim	91	1–1–0
Dallas	83	1–0–0
Los Angeles	79	0–0–1
Phoenix	79	2–0–0
San Jose*	117	1–0–0

Notes: * denotes division winner; teams in bold are in the Southeast Division; teams in italics qualified for the playoffs; points refer to the points achieved by the team whom the Hurricanes played against

= Member of the Atlantic Division
= Member of the Northeast Division
= Member of the Southeast Division
= Member of the Central Division
= Member of the Northeast Division
= Member of the Pacific Division

== Playoffs ==
The Carolina Hurricanes ended the 2008–09 regular season as the Eastern Conference's sixth seed. In the first round, they defeated the New Jersey Devils following a game 7 victory following two goals with 1:20 minutes in the game from Jussi Jokinen and Eric Staal in what is known as the “Shock at the Rock”. In the second round, they defeated the Boston Bruins in 7 games, denying Boston's 3–1 series comeback attempt following an overtime goal from Scott Walker. In doing so, they reached the eastern conference final for the first time since 2006. However, they got swept by the eventual Stanley Cup champion Pittsburgh Penguins in the Eastern Conference Finals.

2009 Stanley Cup playoffs

Eastern Conference Quarter-finals: vs. (3) New Jersey Devils
#	Date	Visitor	Score	Home	OT	Decision	Attendance	Series	Recap
1	April 15	Carolina	1-4	New Jersey		Ward	17,625	0-1
2	April 17	Carolina	2-1	New Jersey	OT	Ward	17,625	1-1
3	April 19	New Jersey	3-2	Carolina	OT	Ward	17,791	1-2
4	April 21	New Jersey	3-4	Carolina		Ward	17,465	2-2
5	April 23	Carolina	0-1	New Jersey		Ward	17,625	2-3
6	April 26	New Jersey	0-4	Carolina		Ward	18,680	3-3
7	April 28	Carolina	4-3	New Jersey		Ward	17,625	4-3

Eastern Conference Semi-finals: vs. (1) Boston Bruins
#	Date	Visitor	Score	Home	OT	Decision	Attendance	Series	Recap
1	May 1	Carolina	1-4	Boston		Ward	17,565	0-1
2	May 3	Carolina	3-0	Boston		Ward	17,565	1-1
3	May 6	Boston	2-3	Carolina	OT	Ward	18,680	2-1
4	May 8	Boston	1-4	Carolina		Ward	18,878	3-1
5	May 10	Carolina	0-4	Boston		Ward	17,565	3-2
6	May 12	Boston	4-2	Carolina		Ward	18,860	3-3
7	May 14	Carolina	3-2	Boston	OT	Ward	17,565	4-3

Eastern Conference Finals: vs. (4) Pittsburgh Penguins
#	Date	Visitor	Score	Home	OT	Decision	Attendance	Series	Recap
1	May 18	Carolina	2-3	Pittsburgh		Ward	17,132	0-1
2	May 21	Carolina	4-7	Pittsburgh		Ward	17,132	0-2
3	May 23	Pittsburgh	6-2	Carolina		Ward	18,789	0-3
4	May 26	Pittsburgh	4-1	Carolina		Ward	18,789	0-4

WIN LOSS

== Player statistics ==
=== Skaters ===
Regular season

Player	GP	G	A	Pts	+/−	PIM
Ray Whitney	82	24	53	77	+2	32
Eric Staal	82	40	35	75	+15	50
Tuomo Ruutu	79	26	28	54	0	79
Rod Brind'Amour	80	16	35	51	-23	36
Sergei Samsonov	81	16	32	48	-8	28
Matt Cullen	69	22	21	43	+11	20
Joe Corvo	81	14	24	38	-1	18
Anton Babchuk	72	16	19	35	+13	16
Joni Pitkanen	71	7	26	33	+11	58
Chad LaRose	81	19	12	31	+6	35
Dennis Seidenberg	70	5	25	30	-9	37
Scott Walker	41	5	10	15	-4	39
Erik Cole^{†}	17	2	13	15	+3	10
Patrick Eaves	74	6	8	14	+7	31
Tim Gleason	70	0	12	12	+3	68
Ryan Bayda	70	5	7	12	+2	26
Jussi Jokinen^{†}	25	1	10	11	-2	12
Niclas Wallin	64	2	8	10	-1	42
Justin Williams^{‡}	32	3	7	10	-9	9
Frantisek Kaberle	30	1	7	8	-4	8
Brandon Sutter	50	1	5	6	-1	16
Josef Melichar^{‡}	15	0	4	4	-1	8
Dan LaCouture	11	2	0	2	-1	10
Michael Ryan	18	0	2	2	-3	2
Dwight Helminen	23	1	1	2	-2	0
Bryan Rodney	8	0	2	2	-3	2
Wade Brookbank^{‡}	27	1	0	1	0	40
Tim Conboy	28	0	1	1	-1	37
Patrick Dwyer	13	1	0	1	-2	0
Jakub Petruzalek	2	0	1	1	+1	0
Brett Carson	5	0	0	0	-3	4
Casey Borer	3	0	0	0	0	5
Zach Boychuk	2	0	0	0	0	0

Playoffs

Player	GP	G	A	Pts	+/−	PIM
Eric Staal	18	10	5	15	-3	4
Ray Whitney	18	3	8	11	-9	4
Chad LaRose	18	4	7	11	0	16
Jussi Jokinen	18	7	4	11	-3	2
Sergei Samsonov	17	5	3	8	+2	6
Joni Pitkanen	18	0	8	8	0	16
Scott Walker	18	1	6	7	-3	19
Joe Corvo	18	2	5	7	-7	4
Matt Cullen	18	3	3	6	0	14
Dennis Seidenberg	16	1	5	6	-5	16
Erik Cole	18	0	5	5	-5	22
Tim Gleason	18	1	4	5	-2	32
Rod Brind'Amour	18	1	3	4	-5	8
Ryan Bayda	15	2	2	4	+2	18
Tuomo Ruutu	16	1	3	4	-3	8
Patrick Eaves	18	1	2	3	-1	13
Frantisek Kaberle	7	0	1	1	+2	2
Anton Babchuk	13	0	1	1	-5	10
Patrick Dwyer	2	0	1	1	+1	0
Niclas Wallin	18	0	0	0	+1	4
Dwight Helminen	1	0	0	0	0	0
Tim Conboy	3	0	0	0	0	9

=== Goaltenders ===
Regular season

Player	GP	Min	W	L	OT	GA	GAA	SA	SV	Sv%	SO
Cam Ward	68	3928	39	23	5	160	2.44	1901	1741	.916	6
Michael Leighton	19	1028	6	7	2	50	2.92	507	457	.901	0

Playoffs

Player	GP	Min	W	L	GA	GAA	SA	SV	Sv%	SO
Cam Ward	18	1101	8	10	49	2.67	576	527	.915	2

^{†}Denotes player spent time with another team before joining Hurricanes. Stats reflect season totals.
^{‡}Traded mid-season
Bold/italics denotes franchise record

Note:

Pos = Position;GP = Games played; G = Goals; A = Assists; Pts = Points; PIM = Penalty minutes; +/- = Plus/minus; PPG = Power-play goals; SHG = Short-handed goals; GWG = Game-winning goals
Pos = Position;GP = Games played; Min, TOI = Minutes played; W = Wins; L = Losses; T,T/OT = Ties; OTL = Overtime losses; GA = Goals-against; GAA = Goals-against average; SO = Shutouts; SA = Shots against; SV = Shots saved;SV% = Save percentage;

== Awards and records ==
=== Milestones ===
Regular Season
Player	Milestone	Reached
Brandon Sutter	1st NHL Game; 1st NHL Assist; 1st NHL Point	October 10, 2008
Zach Boychuk	1st NHL Game	October 17, 2008
Brandon Sutter	1st NHL Goal	October 23, 2008
Dwight Helminen	1st NHL Game	October 28, 2008
Anton Babchuk	100th NHL Game	October 30, 2008
Dwight Helminen	1st NHL Goal; 1st NHL Point	November 2, 2008
Patrick Dwyer	1st NHL Game	November 2, 2008
Brett Carson	1st NHL Game	December 8, 2008
Bryan Rodney	1st NHL Game	December 11, 2008
Bryan Rodney	1st NHL Assist; 1st NHL Point	February 3, 2009
Jakub Petruzalek	1st NHL Game; 1st NHL Assist; 1st NHL Point	February 5, 2009

== News ==
On June 14, the Hurricanes agreed to an extension of their lease at the RBC Center by five years through to 2023-24.

=== Trades ===
Date	Details
February 7, 2009	To Tampa Bay Lightning Wade Brookbank; Josef Melichar; 4th-round pick in 2009 (pick ultimately forfeited)	To Carolina Hurricanes Jussi Jokinen

=== Free agents ===
Player / Former team / Contract Terms; Josef Melichar / Linköpings HC (SEL) / 1 year/$1 million	Player / New team

=== Claimed from waivers ===
Player	Former team	Date claimed off waivers

== Draft picks ==
The 2008 NHL entry draft was in Ottawa, Ontario. The Hurricanes had the 14th overall pick

Round	#	Player	Position	Nationality	College/Junior/Club team (League)
1	14	Zach Boychuk	(C)	Canada	Lethbridge Hurricanes (WHL)
2	45	Zac Dalpe	(C/RW)	Canada	Penticton Vees (BCHL)
4	105	Michal Jordan	(D)	Czech Republic	Plymouth Whalers (OHL)
6	165	Mike Murphy	(G)	Canada	Belleville Bulls (OHL)
7	195	Samuel Morneau	(LW)	Canada	Baie-Comeau Drakkar (QMJHL)

== Farm teams ==
=== American Hockey League ===
The Albany River Rats are the Hurricanes American Hockey League affiliate for the 2008–09 AHL season.

=== ECHL ===
The Florida Everblades are the Hurricanes ECHL affiliate.
