= 2008–09 New Jersey Devils season =

National Hockey League season

2008–09 New Jersey Devils
- Atlantic Division champions
- Division: 1st Atlantic
- Conference: 3rd Eastern
- 2008–09 record: 51–27–4
- Home record: 28–12–1
- Road record: 23–15–3
- Goals for: 244
- Goals against: 209

Team information
- General manager: Lou Lamoriello
- Coach: Brent Sutter
- Captain: Jamie Langenbrunner
- Alternate captains: Patrik Elias; John Madden
- Arena: Prudential Center
- Average attendance: Average: 15,790; Capacity: 89.6% Total: 647,397

Team leaders
- Goals: Zach Parise (45)
- Assists: Zach Parise (49)
- Points: Zach Parise (94)
- Penalty minutes: David Clarkson (164)
- Plus/minus: Travis Zajac (+33)
- Wins: Scott Clemmensen (25)
- Goals against average: Scott Clemmensen (2.39)

The 2008–09 New Jersey Devils season was the 35th season for the National Hockey League (NHL) franchise that was established on June 11, 1974, and 27th season since the franchise relocated from Colorado prior to the 1982–83 NHL season.

== Pre-season ==
Date	Score	Opponent	Location
September 22	4 – 1	Philadelphia Flyers	Wachovia Center
September 24	3 – 2	New York Rangers	Prudential Center
September 27	4 – 2	New York Rangers	Madison Square Garden
September 29	3 – 2	Washington Capitals	Prudential Center
October 1	3 – 0	New York Islanders	Nassau Coliseum
October 3	3 – 2 (OT)	New York Islanders	Prudential Center
October 4	4 – 3	Philadelphia Flyers	Prudential Center

== Regular season ==
The Devils finished the regular season with the fewest power-play opportunities, with just 307.

- March 17, 2009: In a victory over the Chicago Blackhawks, Martin Brodeur broke Patrick Roy's record for most career wins by a goaltender. Also, Patrik Elias became the Devils' all-time leading scorer, previously held by John MacLean, by recording his 702nd career NHL regular-season point.

=== Divisional standings ===
Atlantic Division
		GP	W	L	OTL	GF	GA	Pts
**1**	**New Jersey Devils**	**82**	**51**	**27**	**4**	**244**	**209**	**106**
**2**	**Pittsburgh Penguins**	**82**	**45**	**28**	**9**	**264**	**239**	**99**
**3**	**Philadelphia Flyers**	**82**	**44**	**27**	**11**	**264**	**238**	**99**
**4**	**New York Rangers**	**82**	**43**	**30**	**9**	**210**	**218**	**95**
5	New York Islanders	82	26	47	9	201	279	61

=== Conference standings ===
Eastern Conference
R		Div	GP	W	L	OTL	GF	GA	Pts
**1**	**z – Boston Bruins**	**NE**	**82**	**53**	**19**	**10**	**274**	**196**	116
**2**	**y – Washington Capitals**	**SE**	**82**	**50**	**24**	**8**	**272**	**245**	108
**3**	**y – New Jersey Devils**	**AT**	**82**	**51**	**27**	**4**	**244**	**209**	106
**4**	**Pittsburgh Penguins**	**AT**	**82**	**45**	**28**	**9**	**264**	**239**	99
**5**	**Philadelphia Flyers**	**AT**	**82**	**44**	**27**	**11**	**264**	**238**	99
**6**	**Carolina Hurricanes**	**SE**	**82**	**45**	**30**	**7**	**239**	**226**	97
**7**	**New York Rangers**	**AT**	**82**	**43**	**30**	**9**	**210**	**218**	95
**8**	**Montreal Canadiens**	**NE**	**82**	**41**	**30**	**11**	**249**	**247**	93
8.5
9	Florida Panthers	SE	82	41	30	11	234	231	93
10	Buffalo Sabres	NE	82	41	32	9	250	234	91
11	Ottawa Senators	NE	82	36	35	11	217	237	83
12	Toronto Maple Leafs	NE	82	34	35	13	250	293	81
13	Atlanta Thrashers	SE	82	35	41	6	257	280	76
14	Tampa Bay Lightning	SE	82	24	40	18	210	279	66
15	New York Islanders	AT	82	26	47	9	201	279	61

bold – qualified for playoffs, y – division winner, z – placed first in conference (and division)

AT – Atlantic Division, NE – Northeast Division, SE – Southeast Division

== Schedule and results ==
2008–09 Game Log
October (5-2-2), 12 points (Home 2-1-1; Road 3-1-1)

Game	Date	Opponent	Score	Decision	Location/Attendance	Record
1	10	New York Islanders	1-2	Brodeur	Prudential Center – 16,834	1–0–0
2	11	Pittsburgh Penguins	2-1 (OT)	Brodeur	Mellon Arena – 17,132	2–0–0
3	13	New York Rangers	1-4	Brodeur	Madison Square Garden – 18,200	2–1–0
4	16	Atlanta Thrashers	1-0	Brodeur	Philips Arena – 11,293	3–1–0
5	18	Washington Capitals	4-3 (SO)	Brodeur	Verizon Center – 17,904	4–1–0
6	22	Dallas Stars	0-5	Brodeur	Prudential Center – 12,101	5–1–0
7	24	Philadelphia Flyers	6-3	Brodeur	Prudential Center – 15,529	5–2–0
8	25	Philadelphia Flyers	2-3 (OT)	Brodeur	Wachovia Center – 19,611	5–2–1
9	29	Toronto Maple Leafs	6-5 (SO)	Brodeur	Prudential Center – 14,119	5–2–2

November (7-6-0), 14 points (Home 5-3-0; Road 2-3-0)

Game	Date	Opponent	Score	Decision	Location/Attendance	Record
10	1	Atlanta Thrashers	1-6	Brodeur	Prudential Center – 14,958	6–2–2
11	3	Buffalo Sabres	2-0	Weekes	Prudential Center – 10,567	6–3–2
12	5	Tampa Bay Lightning	3-4 (SO)	Weekes	Prudential Center – 11,619	7–3–2
13	8	Detroit Red Wings	1-3	Weekes	Joe Louis Arena – 20,066	7–4–2
14	9	Edmonton Oilers	2-1	Clemmensen	Prudential Center – 14,193	7–5–2
15	12	New York Rangers	5-2	Weekes	Prudential Center – 17,625	7–6–2
16	14	Washington Capitals	1-3	Clemmensen	Verizon Center – 18,277	7–7–2
17	15	Washington Capitals	5-6	Clemmensen	Prudential Center – 17,051	8–7–2
18	20	Florida Panthers	1-3	Clemmensen	Prudential Center – 14,291	9–7–2
19	21	New York Islanders	2-5	Weekes	Prudential Center – 17,138	10–7–2
20	23	Tampa Bay Lightning	7-3	Clemmensen	St. Pete Times Forum – 14,222	11–7–2
21	26	Florida Panthers	3-2 (SO)	Clemmensen	BankAtlantic Center – 14,932	12–7–2
22	29	Pittsburgh Penguins	1-4	Clemmensen	Mellon Arena – 17,132	12–8–2

December (9-4-1), 19 points (Home 4-3-0; Road 5-1-1)

Game	Date	Opponent	Score	Decision	Location/Attendance	Record
23	4	Philadelphia Flyers	3-2 (OT)	Clemmensen	Wachovia Center – 19,577	13–8–2
24	6	Montreal Canadiens	2-1 (OT)	Clemmensen	Bell Centre – 21,273	14–8–2
25	10	Pittsburgh Penguins	1-4	Clemmensen	Prudential Center – 16,808	15–8–2
26	12	New York Rangers	5-8	Clemmensen	Prudential Center – 17,625	16–8–2
27	13	Buffalo Sabres	4-2	Weekes	Prudential Center – 15,713	16–9–2
28	16	Toronto Maple Leafs	2-3 (SO)	Clemmensen	Air Canada Centre – 19,315	16–9–3
29	17	Buffalo Sabres	5-3	Clemmensen	HSBC Arena – 18,690	17–9–3
30	19	Ottawa Senators	1-5	Clemmensen	Prudential Center – 16,400	18–9–3
31	21	Philadelphia Flyers	3-2	Clemmensen	Prudential Center – 14,426	19–9–3
32	23	Boston Bruins	2-0	Clemmensen	Prudential Center – 16,305	19–10–3
33	26	Pittsburgh Penguins	1-0	Clemmensen	Prudential Center – 15,204	19–11–3
34	27	New York Rangers	4-2	Clemmensen	Madison Square Garden – 18,200	20–11–3
35	30	St. Louis Blues	4-3	Clemmensen	Scottrade Center – 19,150	21–11–3
36	31	Dallas Stars	2-4	Clemmensen	American Airlines Center – 18,584	21–12–3

January (11-3-0), 22 points (Home 3-1-0; Road 8-2-0)

Game	Date	Opponent	Score	Decision	Location/Attendance	Record
37	2	Montreal Canadiens	4-1	Clemmensen	Prudential Center – 17,625	22–12–3
38	4	Ottawa Senators	4-3 (OT)	Clemmensen	Prudential Center – 14,798	23–12–3
39	6	Carolina Hurricanes	2-3	Clemmensen	RBC Center – 15,399	23–13–3
40	8	Atlanta Thrashers	4-0	Clemmensen	Prudential Center – 16,489	23–14–3
41	10	Los Angeles Kings	5-1	Weekes	Staples Center – 18,118	24–14–3
42	11	Anaheim Ducks	3-4	Clemmensen	Honda Center – 17,331	24–15–3
43	13	Vancouver Canucks	5-3	Clemmensen	GM Place – 18,630	25–15–3
44	16	Columbus Blue Jackets	2-1	Weekes	Nationwide Arena – 17,738	26–15–3
45	17	New York Islanders	3-1	Clemmensen	Nassau Coliseum – 16,234	27–15–3
46	19	Nashville Predators	3-1	Clemmensen	Sommet Center – 14,848	28–15–3
47	21	Montreal Canadiens	2-5	Clemmensen	Prudential Center – 16,235	29–15–3
48	27	Ottawa Senators	4-1	Clemmensen	Scotiabank Place – 18,786	30–15–3
49	29	Boston Bruins	4-3 (OT)	Clemmensen	TD Banknorth Garden – 17,565	31–15–3
50	30	Pittsburgh Penguins	3-4 (OT)	Clemmensen	Prudential Center – 17,625	32–15–3

February (8-4-0), 16 points (Home 6-2-0; Road 2-2-0)

Game	Date	Opponent	Score	Decision	Location/Attendance	Record
51	3	Washington Capitals	5-2	Clemmensen	Prudential Center – 14,018	32–16–3
52	6	Atlanta Thrashers	5-1	Weekes	Philips Arena – 17,067	33–16–3
53	7	Los Angeles Kings	3-1	Clemmensen	Prudential Center – 17,056	33–17–3
54	9	New York Rangers	0-3	Clemmensen	Prudential Center – 17,625	34–17–3
55	11	New York Islanders	2-4	Weekes	Prudential Center – 14,251	35–17–3
56	13	Boston Bruins	0-1	Clemmensen	Prudential Center – 15,257	36–17–3
57	15	San Jose Sharks	5-6	Clemmensen	Prudential Center – 17,625	37–17–3
58	17	Florida Panthers	0-4	Clemmensen	BankAtlantic Center – 14,514	37–18–3
59	19	Tampa Bay Lightning	3-2 (SO)	Weekes	St. Pete Times Forum – 14,408	38–18–3
60	21	New York Islanders	0-4	Clemmensen	Nassau Coliseum – 15,511	38–19–3
61	26	Colorado Avalanche	0-4	Brodeur	Prudential Center – 16,107	39–19–3
62	28	Florida Panthers	2-7	Brodeur	Prudential Center – 16,256	40–19–3

March (7-6-1), 15 points (Home 5-1-0; Road 2-5-1)

Game	Date	Opponent	Score	Decision	Location/Attendance	Record
63	1	Philadelphia Flyers	0-3	Brodeur	Prudential Center – 17,625	41–19–3
64	3	Toronto Maple Leafs	3-2 (OT)	Brodeur	Air Canada Centre – 19,389	42–19–3
65	7	New York Islanders	3-7	Brodeur	Nassau Coliseum – 15,524	42–20–3
66	10	Calgary Flames	2-3	Brodeur	Prudential Center – 14,598	43–20–3
67	12	Phoenix Coyotes	2-5	Brodeur	Prudential Center – 14,578	44–20–3
68	14	Montreal Canadiens	3-1	Brodeur	Bell Centre – 21,273	45–20–3
69	17	Chicago Blackhawks	2-3	Brodeur	Prudential Center – 17,625	46–20–3
70	18	Carolina Hurricanes	2-4	Weekes	RBC Center – 18,544	46–21–3
71	20	Minnesota Wild	0-4	Brodeur	Prudential Center – 17,625	47–21–3
72	22	Boston Bruins	1-4	Brodeur	TD Banknorth Garden – 17,565	47–22–3
73	23	Philadelphia Flyers	2-4	Brodeur	Wachovia Center – 19,762	47–23–3
74	27	Chicago Blackhawks	2-3 (OT)	Brodeur	United Center – 21,617	47–23–4
75	28	Carolina Hurricanes	2-1	Brodeur	Prudential Center – 17,018	47–24–4
76	30	New York Rangers	0-3	Brodeur	Madison Square Garden – 18,200	47–25–4

April (4-2-0), 8 points (Home 2-1-0; Road 2-1-0)

Game	Date	Opponent	Score	Decision	Location/Attendance	Record
77	1	Pittsburgh Penguins	1-6	Brodeur	Mellon Arena – 17,132	47–26–4
78	3	Tampa Bay Lightning	4-5 (OT)	Brodeur	Prudential Center – 17,625	48–26–4
79	4	Buffalo Sabres	3-2	Brodeur	HSBC Arena – 18,690	49–26–4
80	7	Toronto Maple Leafs	4-1	Brodeur	Prudential Center – 15,046	49–27–4
81	9	Ottawa Senators	3-2 (SO)	Brodeur	Scotiabank Place – 20,151	50–27–4
82	11	Carolina Hurricanes	2-3	Brodeur	Prudential Center – 17,625	51–27–4

Schedule

== Playoffs ==
The New Jersey Devils ended the 2008–09 regular season as the Atlantic Division Champions and the Eastern Conference's third seed. The Devils have made the playoffs for the 12th straight season.

2009 Stanley Cup playoffs

Eastern Conference Quarter-finals: vs. (6) Carolina Hurricanes
#	Date	Visitor	Score	Home	OT	Decision	Attendance	Series	Recap
1	April 15	Carolina Hurricanes	1 – 4	New Jersey Devils		Brodeur	17,625	Devils lead 1-0	Recap
2	April 17	Carolina Hurricanes	2 – 1	New Jersey Devils	OT	Brodeur	17,625	Series is tied 1-1	Recap
3	April 19	New Jersey Devils	3 – 2	Carolina Hurricanes	OT	Brodeur	17,971	Devils lead 2-1	Recap
4	April 21	New Jersey Devils	3 – 4	Carolina Hurricanes		Brodeur	17,465	Series is tied 2-2	Recap
5	April 23	Carolina Hurricanes	0 – 1	New Jersey Devils		Brodeur	17,625	Devils lead 3-2	Recap
6	April 26	New Jersey Devils	0 – 4	Carolina Hurricanes		Brodeur	18,680	Series tied 3-3	Recap
7	April 28	Carolina Hurricanes	4 – 3	New Jersey Devils		Brodeur	17,625	Devils lose 4-3	Recap

Win Loss Win Playoff Series Eliminated from playoffs

== Media ==
Television coverage was now on MSG Plus, still under the play-by-play of Mike Emrick and Chico Resch. Radio coverage was still on WFAN with Matt Loughlin and Sherry Ross.

== Player statistics ==
=== Skaters ===
Note: Pos = Position; GP = Games played; G = Goals; A = Assists; Pts = Points; PIM = Penalty minutes; +/- = Plus/minus; PPG = Power-play goals; SHG = Short-handed goals; GWG = Game-winning goals

Regular season

Player	GP	G	A	Pts	+/−	PIM
Zach Parise	82	45	49	94	+30	24
Patrik Elias	77	31	47	78	+18	32
Jamie Langenbrunner	81	29	40	69	+25	56
Travis Zajac	82	20	42	62	+33	29
Brian Gionta	81	20	40	60	+12	32
Dainius Zubrus	82	15	25	40	+6	69
Paul Martin	73	5	28	33	+21	36
David Clarkson	82	17	15	32	-1	164
Brian Rolston	64	15	17	32	+2	30
Johnny Oduya	82	7	22	29	+21	30
John Madden	76	7	16	23	-7	26
Colin White	71	1	17	18	+18	46
Bryce Salvador	76	3	13	16	-1	78
Mike Mottau	80	1	14	15	+24	35
Brendan Shanahan	34	6	8	14	-2	29
Jay Pandolfo	61	5	5	10	-12	10
Bobby Holik	62	4	5	9	-2	66
Mike Rupp	72	3	6	9	-2	136
Andy Greene	49	2	7	9	+3	22
Niclas Havelid^{†}	15	0	4	4	-2	6
Anssi Salmela^{‡}	17	0	3	3	+1	6
Petr Vrana	16	1	0	1	-4	2
Nicklas Bergfors	8	1	0	1	-1	0
Jay Leach	24	0	1	1	0	21
Pierre-Luc Letourneau-Leblond	8	0	1	1	+3	22
Matt Halischuk	1	0	1	1	-1	0
Sheldon Brookbank^{‡}	15	0	0	0	+1	25
Barry Tallackson	4	0	0	0	-1	0
Patrick Davis	1	0	0	0	0	0

Playoffs

Player	GP	G	A	Pts	+/−	PIM
Zach Parise	7	3	3	6	+2	2
Brian Gionta	7	2	3	5	0	4
Paul Martin	7	0	4	4	0	4
Travis Zajac	7	1	3	4	0	6
Patrik Elias	7	1	2	3	-1	2
Jamie Langenbrunner	4	2	1	3	0	2
Brendan Shanahan	7	1	2	3	-1	2
Mike Mottau	7	1	1	2	-3	0
Brian Rolston	7	1	1	2	+2	4
David Clarkson	7	2	0	2	-1	19
Niclas Havelid	7	0	1	1	0	2
Bobby Holik	3	0	1	1	0	2
John Madden	7	0	1	1	-3	4
Jay Pandolfo	7	1	0	1	-2	0
Colin White	7	0	1	1	-3	6
Dainius Zubrus	7	0	1	1	-2	10
Andy Greene	3	0	1	1	-1	0
Bryce Salvador	4	0	0	0	-3	4
Mike Rupp	7	0	0	0	-2	14
Johnny Oduya	7	0	0	0	+3	2

=== Goaltenders ===
Note: GP = Games played; Min = Minutes; W = Wins; L = Losses; OT = Overtime losses; GA = Goals against; GAA= Goals against average; SA= Shots against; SV= Saves; Sv% = Save percentage; SO= Shutouts

Regular season

Player	GP	Min	W	L	OT	GA	GAA	SA	SV	Sv%	SO
Scott Clemmensen	40	2356	25	13	1	94	2.39	1138	1044	.917	2
Martin Brodeur	31	1814	19	9	3	73	2.41	870	797	.916	5
Kevin Weekes	16	795	7	5	0	32	2.42	399	367	.920	0

Playoffs

Player	GP	Min	W	L	GA	GAA	SA	SV	Sv%	SO
Martin Brodeur	7	427	3	4	17	2.39	239	222	.929	1

^{†}Denotes player spent time with another team before joining Devils. Stats reflect time with Devils only.
^{‡}Traded mid-season. Stats reflect time with Devils only.

== Awards and records ==
=== Awards ===
Regular Season
Player	Award	Awarded
Zach Parise	NHL Second All-Star Team – Left Wing	End of regular season
Martin Brodeur	NHL Third Star of the Week	October 12, 2008
Patrik Elias	NHL Third Star of the Week	December 21, 2008
Jamie Langenbrunner	NHL First Star of the Month	January 2009
Jamie Langenbrunner	NHL First Star of the Week	February 1, 2009
Zach Parise	NHL First Star of the Week	February 15, 2009
Martin Brodeur	NHL First Star of the Week	March 1, 2009
Martin Brodeur	NHL First Star of the Week	March 15, 2009

=== Nominations ===
Regular Season
Player	Award	Place
Zach Parise	Lady Byng Memorial Trophy	Finalist

=== Records ===
Player	Record (Amount)	Achieved
Martin Brodeur	Most consecutive opening nights with a single team (14)	October 10, 2008
Martin Brodeur	Most career wins by a goaltender (552)	March 17, 2009

=== Milestones ===
Regular Season
Player	Milestone	Reached
Anssi Salmela	1st NHL Game	October 10, 2008
Petr Vrana	1st NHL Game; 1st NHL Goal; 1st NHL Point	October 18, 2008
Pierre-Luc Letourneau-Leblond	1st NHL Game; 1st NHL Assist; 1st NHL Point	October 22, 2008
Dainius Zubrus	400th NHL Point	October 24, 2008
Brian Gionta	400th NHL Game	October 25, 2008
Matt Halischuk	1st NHL Game	October 29, 2008
Nicklas Bergfors	1st NHL Goal; 1st NHL Point	November 1, 2008
David Clarkson	100th NHL Game	November 5, 2008
Patrick Davis	1st NHL Game	November 9, 2008
Anssi Salmela	1st NHL Assist; 1st NHL Point	November 12, 2008
Zach Parise	100th NHL Assist	December 19, 2008
Zach Parise	200th NHL Point	December 27, 2008

== Transactions ==
=== Trades ===
June 20, 2008	To New Jersey Devils 1st-round pick (23rd overall) in 2008; 2nd-round pick (54th overall) in 2008	To Washington Capitals 1st-round pick (21st overall) in 2008
June 20, 2008	To New Jersey Devils 1st-round pick (24th overall) in 2008; 3rd-round pick in 2009	To Minnesota Wild 1st-round pick (23rd overall) in 2008
February 3, 2009	To New Jersey Devils David McIntyre	To Anaheim Ducks Sheldon Brookbank
March 2, 2009	To New Jersey Devils Niclas Havelid; Myles Stoesz	To Atlanta Thrashers Anssi Salmela

=== Free agents ===
Player	Former team	Contract Terms
Brian Rolston	Minnesota Wild	4 years, $20 million
Bobby Holík	Atlanta Thrashers	1 year, $2.5 million
Scott Clemmensen	Toronto Maple Leafs	1 year
Brendan Shanahan	New York Rangers	1 year, $800,000

Player	New team
Sergei Brylin	SKA Saint Petersburg
Arron Asham	Philadelphia Flyers
Vitaly Vishnevskiy	Lokomotiv Yaroslavl
Karel Rachunek	Dynamo Moscow

== Draft picks ==
New Jersey's picks at the 2008 NHL entry draft in Ottawa, Ontario.

Round	Pick	Player	Position	Nationality	Club Team
1	24	Mattias Tedenby	Left wing	Sweden	HV71 Jr. (J20 SuperElit)
2	52	Brandon Burlon	Defence	Canada	St. Michael's Buzzers (OPJHL)
2	54	Patrice Cormier	Center	Canada	Rimouski Océanic (QMJHL)
3	82	Adam Henrique	Center	Canada	Windsor Spitfires (OHL)
4	112	Matt Delahey	Defence	Canada	Regina Pats (WHL)
5	142	Kory Nagy	Center	Canada	Oshawa Generals (OHL)
6	172	David Wohlberg	Center	United States	U.S. National Team Development Program (NAHL)
7	202	Harry Young	Defence	Canada	Windsor Spitfires (OHL)
7	205	Jean-Sebastien Berube	Left wing	Canada	Rouyn-Noranda Huskies (QMJHL)

== See also ==
- 2008–09 NHL season

== Farm teams ==
The Lowell Devils of the American Hockey League and the Trenton Devils of the ECHL remain the New Jersey Devils' minor league affiliates for the 2008–09 season.
