= 2008–09 Buffalo Sabres season =

NHL hockey team season

2008–09 Buffalo Sabres
- Division: 3rd Northeast
- Conference: 10th Eastern
- 2008–09 record: 41–32–9
- Home record: 23–15–3
- Road record: 18–17–6
- Goals for: 250
- Goals against: 234

Team information
- General manager: Darcy Regier
- Coach: Lindy Ruff
- Captain: Craig Rivet
- Alternate captains: Jochen Hecht; Teppo Numminen; Jason Pominville; Jaroslav Spacek
- Arena: HSBC Arena
- Average attendance: Average: 18,533; Capacity: 99.2% Total: 296,522

Team leaders
- Goals: Thomas Vanek (40)
- Assists: Jason Pominville (46)
- Points: Derek Roy (70)
- Penalty minutes: Craig Rivet (125)
- Plus/minus: Tim Connolly (+12)
- Wins: Ryan Miller (34)
- Goals against average: Ryan Miller (2.53)

The 2008–09 Buffalo Sabres season was the 39th season of operation for the Buffalo Sabres in the National Hockey League, their 38th season of play.

== Pre-season ==
In their second pre-season game, the Sabres played the Montreal Canadiens in Roberval, Quebec, the 2008 winner of the Kraft Hockeyville contest. In their newly renovated arena, Roberval hosted the preseason game on Tuesday, September 23, 2008. Montreal scored the first three goals, then held off Buffalo for a 3–2 win in at Benoit-Levesque Arena.

2008 Pre-season Game Log: 2–4–1 (Home: 1–0–1; Road: 1–4–0)
#	Date	Visitor	Score	Home	OT	Decision	Attendance	Record	Recap
1	September 22	Buffalo	4–7	Toronto		Enroth	18,819	0–1–0
2	September 23	Buffalo	2–3	Montreal†		Dennis	?	0–2–0
3	September 27	Toronto	2–3	Buffalo	OT	Miller	14,629	1–2–0
4	September 28	Minnesota	2–1	Buffalo	SO	Lalime	17,311	1–2–1
5	October 1	Buffalo	2–3	Minnesota		Miller	18,064	1–3–1
6	October 2	Buffalo	5–2	Columbus		Lalime	11,314	2–3–1
7	October 5	Buffalo	0–3	Detroit		Miller	15,983	2–4–1
†Game was played in Roberval, Quebec.

== Regular season ==
=== Divisional standings ===
Northeast Division
		GP	W	L	OTL	GF	GA	Pts
**1**	**z – Boston Bruins**	**82**	**53**	**19**	**10**	**274**	**196**	**116**
**2**	**Montreal Canadiens**	**82**	**41**	**30**	**11**	**249**	**247**	**93**
3	Buffalo Sabres	82	41	32	9	250	234	91
4	Ottawa Senators	82	36	35	11	217	237	83
5	Toronto Maple Leafs	82	34	35	13	250	293	81

=== Conference standings ===
Eastern Conference
R		Div	GP	W	L	OTL	GF	GA	Pts
**1**	**z – Boston Bruins**	**NE**	**82**	**53**	**19**	**10**	**274**	**196**	116
**2**	**y – Washington Capitals**	**SE**	**82**	**50**	**24**	**8**	**272**	**245**	108
**3**	**y – New Jersey Devils**	**AT**	**82**	**51**	**27**	**4**	**244**	**209**	106
**4**	**Pittsburgh Penguins**	**AT**	**82**	**45**	**28**	**9**	**264**	**239**	99
**5**	**Philadelphia Flyers**	**AT**	**82**	**44**	**27**	**11**	**264**	**238**	99
**6**	**Carolina Hurricanes**	**SE**	**82**	**45**	**30**	**7**	**239**	**226**	97
**7**	**New York Rangers**	**AT**	**82**	**43**	**30**	**9**	**210**	**218**	95
**8**	**Montreal Canadiens**	**NE**	**82**	**41**	**30**	**11**	**249**	**247**	93
8.5
9	Florida Panthers	SE	82	41	30	11	234	231	93
10	Buffalo Sabres	NE	82	41	32	9	250	234	91
11	Ottawa Senators	NE	82	36	35	11	217	237	83
12	Toronto Maple Leafs	NE	82	34	35	13	250	293	81
13	Atlanta Thrashers	SE	82	35	41	6	257	280	76
14	Tampa Bay Lightning	SE	82	24	40	18	210	279	66
15	New York Islanders	AT	82	26	47	9	201	279	61

bold – qualified for playoffs, y – division winner, z – placed first in conference (and division)

AT – Atlantic Division, NE – Northeast Division, SE – Southeast Division

== Schedule and results ==
- Green background indicates win (2 points).
- Red background indicates regulation loss (0 points).
- White background indicates overtime/shootout loss (1 point).

2008–09 Game Log

October: 6–2–2 (Home: 3–2–0; Road: 3–0–2)
#	Date	Visitor	Score	Home	OT	Decision	Attendance	Record	Pts	Recap
1	October 10	Montreal	1–2	Buffalo	SO	Miller	18,690	1–0–0	2
2	October 13	Buffalo	7–1	NY Islanders		Lalime	13,523	2–0–0	4
3	October 15	Buffalo	3–1	NY Rangers		Miller	18,200	3–0–0	6
4	October 17	Vancouver	2–5	Buffalo		Miller	18,449	4–0–0	8
5	October 18	Buffalo	2–3	Atlanta	SO	Lalime	14,091	4–0–1	9
6	October 21	Boston	2–3	Buffalo	SO	Miller	18,334	5–0–1	11
7	October 23	Buffalo	4–3	Minnesota	OT	Miller	18,568	6–0–1	13
8	October 25	Buffalo	1–2	Colorado	SO	Miller	18,007	6–0–2	14
9	October 27	Ottawa	5–2	Buffalo		Lalime	18,690	6–1–2	14
10	October 30	Tampa Bay	5–2	Buffalo		Miller	18,690	6–2–2	14

November: 5–7–1 (Home: 4–3–1; Road: 1–4–0)
#	Date	Visitor	Score	Home	OT	Decision	Attendance	Record	Pts	Recap
11	November 1	Washington	0–5	Buffalo		Miller	18,690	7–2–2	16
12	November 3	Buffalo	2–0	New Jersey		Miller	10,567	8–2–2	18
13	November 7	Atlanta	5–4	Buffalo	OT	Miller	18,466	8–2–3	19
14	November 8	Buffalo	1–3	Boston		Miller	17,565	8–3–3	19
15	November 12	St Louis	3–4	Buffalo		Miller	18,690	9–3–3	21
16	November 14	Columbus	6–1	Buffalo		Lalime	18,690	9–4–3	21
17	November 15	Buffalo	2–5	Pittsburgh		Miller	17,132	9–5–3	21
18	November 19	Buffalo	4–7	Boston		Miller	15,623	9–6–3	21
19	November 21	Philadelphia	3–0	Buffalo		Miller	18,256	9–7–3	21
20	November 22	NY Islanders	4–2	Buffalo		Lalime	18,529	9–8–3	21
21	November 26	Boston	2–3	Buffalo		Miller	18,326	10–8–3	23
22	November 28	Pittsburgh	3–4	Buffalo		Miller	18,690	11–8–3	25
23	November 29	Buffalo	2–3	Montreal		Lalime	21,273	11–9–3	25

December: 6–6–2 (Home: 3–4–1; Road: 3–2–1)
#	Date	Visitor	Score	Home	OT	Decision	Attendance	Record	Pts	Recap
24	December 1	Nashville	2–0	Buffalo		Miller	18,690	11–10–3	25
25	December 4	Buffalo	1–2	Florida		Miller	13,123	11–11–3	25
26	December 6	Buffalo	4–3	Tampa Bay		Miller	17,154	12–11–3	27
27	December 8	Buffalo	4–3	Pittsburgh		Miller	16,976	13–11–3	29
28	December 10	Tampa Bay	2–4	Buffalo		Miller	18,431	14–11–3	31
29	December 12	Toronto	2–1	Buffalo		Miller	18,211	14–12–3	31
30	December 13	Buffalo	4–2	New Jersey		Lalime	15,713	15–12–3	33
31	December 17	New Jersey	5–3	Buffalo		Miller	18,690	15–13–3	33
32	December 19	Los Angeles	0–5	Buffalo		Miller	18,147	16–13–3	35
33	December 20	Buffalo	3–4	Montreal	OT	Miller	21,273	16–13–4	36
34	December 22	Pittsburgh	4–3	Buffalo	OT	Miller	18,690	16–13–5	37
35	December 26	Buffalo	2–3	Washington		Lalime	18,277	16–14–5	37
36	December 27	NY Islanders	3–4	Buffalo	SO	Miller	18,690	17–14–5	39
37	December 30	Washington	4–2	Buffalo		Miller	18,690	17–15–5	39

January: 9–4–0 (Home: 3–0–0; Road: 6–4–0)
#	Date	Visitor	Score	Home	OT	Decision	Attendance	Record	Pts	Recap
38	January 1	Buffalo	4–1	Toronto		Miller	19,176	18–15–5	41
39	January 3	Buffalo	4–2	Boston		Miller	17,565	19–15–5	43
40	January 6	Ottawa	2–4	Buffalo		Miller	18,443	20–15–5	45
41	January 9	NY Rangers	1–2	Buffalo	SO	Miller	18,385	21–15–5	47
42	January 10	Buffalo	1–3	Detroit		Miller	20,066	21–16–5	47
43	January 14	Buffalo	1–4	Chicago		Lalime	21,684	21–17–5	47
44	January 15	Buffalo	5–4	Dallas	SO	Miller	17,339	22–17–5	49
45	January 17	Carolina	1–3	Buffalo		Miller	18,690	23–17–5	51
46	January 19	Buffalo	3–2	Florida	SO	Miller	12,480	24–17–5	53
47	January 21	Buffalo	3–5	Tampa Bay		Miller	15,611	24–18–5	53
48	January 27	Buffalo	10–2	Edmonton		Miller	16,839	25–18–5	55
49	January 28	Buffalo	2–5	Calgary		Miller	19,289	25–19–5	55
50	January 31	Buffalo	2–0	Phoenix		Miller	16,253	26–19–5	57

February: 5–6–2 (Home: 4–3–0; Road: 1–3–2)
#	Date	Visitor	Score	Home	OT	Decision	Attendance	Record	Pts	Recap
51	February 2	Buffalo	2–3	Anaheim		Lalime	16,874	26–20–5	57
52	February 4	Toronto	0–5	Buffalo		Miller	17,355	27–20–5	59
53	February 6	Montreal	2–3	Buffalo		Miller	18,161	28–20–5	61
54	February 7	Buffalo	2–3	Ottawa	SO	Miller	18,452	28–20–6	62
55	February 11	Ottawa	3–1	Buffalo		Miller	18,690	28–21–6	62
56	February 13	San Jose	5–6	Buffalo	SO	Miller	18,690	29–21–6	64
57	February 15	Carolina	3–0	Buffalo		Miller	18,690	29–22–6	64
58	February 17	Buffalo	4–1	Toronto		Miller	19,287	30–22–6	66
59	February 19	Buffalo	3–6	Philadelphia		Miller	19,642	30–23–6	66
60	February 21	NY Rangers	2–4	Buffalo		Miller	18,690	31–23–6	68
61	February 24	Anaheim	3–2	Buffalo		Lalime	18,690	31–24–6	68
62	February 26	Buffalo	1–2	Carolina	SO	Lalime	18,219	31–24–7	69
63	February 28	Buffalo	0–2	NY Islanders		Lalime	14,198	31–25–7	69

March: 6–5–1 (Home: 5–1–1; Road: 1–4–0)
#	Date	Visitor	Score	Home	OT	Decision	Attendance	Record	Pts	Recap
64	March 4	Montreal	1–5	Buffalo		Lalime	17,745	32–25–7	71
65	March 6	Phoenix	1–5	Buffalo		Lalime	18,690	33–25–7	73
66	March 7	Buffalo	3–6	Ottawa		Lalime	18,444	33–26–7	73
67	March 10	Buffalo	2–5	Philadelphia		Lalime	19,421	33–27–7	73
68	March 12	Florida	1–3	Buffalo		Lalime	18,690	34–27–7	75
69	March 14	Atlanta	4–3	Buffalo	SO	Lalime	18,690	34–27–8	76
70	March 17	Buffalo	2–4	Ottawa		Tellqvist	20,053	34–28–8	76
71	March 20	Philadelphia	6–4	Buffalo		Lalime	18,690	34–29–8	76
72	March 21	Buffalo	3–5	NY Rangers		Lalime	18,200	34–30–8	76
73	March 25	Florida	3–5	Buffalo		Tellqvist	18,690	35–30–8	78
74	March 27	Toronto	3–5	Buffalo		Miller	18,620	36–30–8	80
75	March 28	Buffalo	4–3	Montreal	SO	Miller	21,273	37–30–8	82

April: 4–2–1 (Home: 1–2–0; Road: 3–0–1)
#	Date	Visitor	Score	Home	OT	Decision	Attendance	Record	Pts	Recap
76	April 1	Buffalo	2–3	Atlanta	OT	Miller	15,038	37–30–9	83
77	April 3	Buffalo	5–4	Washington	OT	Miller	18,277	38–30–9	85
78	April 4	New Jersey	2–3	Buffalo		Miller	18,690	38–31–9	85
79	April 6	Detroit	1–4	Buffalo		Miller	18,690	38–32–9	85
80	April 8	Buffalo	3–1	Toronto		Miller	19,516	39–32–9	87
81	April 9	Buffalo	5-1	Carolina		Miller	18,513	40–32–9	89
82	April 11	Boston	1-6	Buffalo		Tellqvist	18,690	41-32-9	91

== Playoffs ==
The Buffalo Sabres failed to qualify for the playoffs for the second consecutive year.

== Player statistics ==
=== Skaters ===
Regular season

Player	GP	G	A	Pts	+/−	PIM
Derek Roy	82	28	42	70	−5	38
Jason Pominville	82	20	46	66	−4	18
Thomas Vanek	73	40	24	64	−1	44
Tim Connolly	48	18	29	47	+12	22
Jaroslav Spacek	80	8	37	45	+2	38
Drew Stafford	79	20	25	45	+3	29
Ales Kotalik^{‡}	56	13	19	32	−7	28
Clarke MacArthur	71	17	14	31	−4	56
Paul Gaustad	62	12	17	29	+4	108
Jochen Hecht	70	12	15	27	−9	33
Daniel Paille	73	12	15	27	0	20
Craig Rivet	64	2	22	24	+4	125
Toni Lydman	80	3	20	23	0	70
Maxim Afinogenov	48	6	14	20	−7	20
Adam Mair	75	8	11	19	+4	95
Andrej Sekera	69	3	16	19	−11	22
Teppo Numminen	57	2	15	17	−4	22
Henrik Tallinder	66	1	11	12	−2	36
Matt Ellis	45	7	5	12	+4	12
Patrick Kaleta	51	4	5	9	+1	89
Nathan Paetsch	23	2	4	6	+3	25
Chris Butler	47	2	4	6	+11	18
Dominic Moore^{†}	18	1	3	4	−1	23
Mark Mancari	7	1	1	2	−4	4
Nathan Gerbe	10	0	1	1	+3	4
Andrew Peters	28	0	1	1	−2	81
Marc-Andre Gragnani	4	0	0	0	+2	2
Tim Kennedy	1	0	0	0	0	0
Mike Weber	7	0	0	0	−3	19

=== Goaltenders ===
Regular season

Player	GP	Min	W	L	OT	GA	GAA	SA	SV	Sv%	SO
Ryan Miller	59	3443:25	34	18	6	145	2.53	1773	1628	.918	5
Patrick Lalime	24	1296:42	5	13	3	67	3.10	669	602	.900	0
Mikael Tellqvist^{†}	6	229:45	2	1	0	9	2.35	125	116	.928	0

^{†}Denotes player spent time with another team before joining Sabres. Stats reflect time with Sabres only.
^{‡}Traded mid-season. Stats reflect time with Sabres only.

Note:

Pos = Position;GP = Games played; G = Goals; A = Assists; Pts = Points; PIM = Penalty minutes; +/- = Plus/minus; PPG = Power-play goals; SHG = Short-handed goals; GWG = Game-winning goals
Pos = Position;GP = Games played; Min, TOI = Minutes played; W = Wins; L = Losses; T,T/OT = Ties; OTL = Overtime losses; GA = Goals-against; GAA = Goals-against average; SO = Shutouts; SA = Shots against; SV = Shots saved;SV% = Save percentage;

== Awards and records ==
=== Milestones ===
Regular Season
Player	Milestone	Date achieved
Jason Pominville	100th NHL assist	October 13, 2008
Thomas Vanek	200th NHL point	October 15, 2008
Lindy Ruff	400th NHL win	October 15, 2008
Patrick Lalime	400th NHL appearance	October 27, 2008
Mark Mancari	1st NHL goal	November 22, 2008
Nathan Gerbe	1st NHL game	December 6, 2008
Nathan Gerbe	1st NHL assist	December 13, 2008
Chris Butler	1st NHL game 1st NHL assist	December 19, 2008
Tim Kennedy	1st NHL game	December 27, 2008
Derek Roy	100th NHL Goal	February 13, 2009
Drew Stafford	100th NHL Point	February 13, 2009

== Transactions ==
=== Trades ===
June 20, 2008	To Buffalo Sabres 1st-round pick (12th overall) in 2008	To Los Angeles Kings 1st-round pick (13th overall) in 2008; 3rd-round pick in 2009
June 21, 2008	To Buffalo Sabres 3rd-round pick (81st overall) in 2008; 4th-round pick (101st overall) in 2008	To Los Angeles Kings 3rd-round pick (74th overall) in 2008
July 4, 2008	To Buffalo Sabres Craig Rivet; 7th-round pick in 2010	To San Jose Sharks 2nd-round pick in 2009; 2nd-round pick in 2010
July 4, 2008	To Buffalo Sabres 3rd-round pick in 2009; 2nd-round pick in 2010	To Vancouver Canucks Steve Bernier
March 4, 2009	To Buffalo Sabres Mikael Tellqvist	To Phoenix Coyotes 4th-round pick in 2010
March 4, 2009	To Buffalo Sabres Dominic Moore	To Toronto Maple Leafs 2nd-round pick in 2009
March 4, 2009	To Buffalo Sabres 2nd-round pick in 2009	To Edmonton Oilers Ales Kotalik

=== Free agents ===
Player	Former team	Contract Terms
Patrick Lalime	Chicago Blackhawks	2 years, $2 million
Mathieu Darche	Tampa Bay Lightning	1 Year, $500,000

Player	New team
Dmitri Kalinin	New York Rangers

=== Claimed from waivers ===
Player	Former team	Date claimed off waivers
Matt Ellis	Los Angeles Kings	October 1

== Draft picks ==
Buffalo's picks at the 2008 NHL entry draft in Ottawa, Ontario.

Round	Pick	Player	Position	Nationality	College/Junior Team
1	12	Tyler Myers	D	Canada	Kelowna Rockets (WHL)
1	26	Tyler Ennis	C	Canada	Medicine Hat Tigers (WHL)
2	44	Luke Adam	C	Canada	St. John's Fog Devils (QMJHL)
3	81	Corey Fienhage	D	United States	Eastview High School (USHS-MN)
4	101	Justin Jokinen	RW	United States	Cloquet High School (USHS-MN)
4	104	Jordon Southorn	D	United States	P.E.I. Rocket (QMJHL)
5	134	Jacob Lagace	LW	Canada	Chicoutimi Sagueneens (QMJHL)
6	164	Nick Crawford	D	Canada	Saginaw Spirit (OHL)

== See also ==
- 2008–09 NHL season

== Farm teams ==
On June 11, the Buffalo Sabres signed a three-year deal with the Portland Pirates of the American Hockey League, ending a 29-year affiliation with the Rochester Americans.
