= 2008–09 Atlanta Thrashers season =

National Hockey League team season

2008–09 Atlanta Thrashers
- Division: 4th Southeast
- Conference: 13th Eastern
- 2008–09 record: 35–41–6
- Home record: 18–21–2
- Road record: 17–20–4
- Goals for: 257
- Goals against: 280

Team information
- General manager: Don Waddell
- Coach: John Anderson
- Captain: Vacant (Oct.–Jan.); Ilya Kovalchuk (Jan.–Apr.)
- Alternate captains: Colby Armstrong; Niclas Havelid (Oct.–Mar.); Ilya Kovalchuk (Oct.–Jan.); Vyacheslav Kozlov; Mathieu Schneider (Oct.–Feb.)
- Arena: Philips Arena
- Average attendance: Average: 14,535; Capacity: 78.4% Total: 276,166

Team leaders
- Goals: Ilya Kovalchuk (43)
- Assists: Todd White (51)
- Points: Ilya Kovalchuk (91)
- Penalty minutes: Eric Boulton (163)
- Plus/minus: Rich Peverley (+14)
- Wins: Kari Lehtonen (18)
- Goals against average: Kari Lehtonen (3.09)

The 2008–09 Atlanta Thrashers season was the 26th season of play for the National Hockey League franchise that was established on June 22, 1979, and 34th season for the organization overall. The Thrashers attempted to make the Stanley Cup playoffs for the first time since the 2006–07 season, but failed to qualify.

== Regular season ==
=== Divisional standings ===
Southeast Division
		GP	W	L	OTL	GF	GA	Pts
**1**	**y – Washington Capitals**	**82**	**50**	**24**	**8**	**272**	**245**	**108**
**2**	**Carolina Hurricanes**	**82**	**45**	**30**	**7**	**239**	**226**	**97**
3	Florida Panthers	82	41	30	11	234	231	93
4	Atlanta Thrashers	82	35	41	6	257	280	76
5	Tampa Bay Lightning	82	24	40	18	210	279	66

=== Conference standings ===
Eastern Conference
R		Div	GP	W	L	OTL	GF	GA	Pts
**1**	**z – Boston Bruins**	**NE**	**82**	**53**	**19**	**10**	**274**	**196**	116
**2**	**y – Washington Capitals**	**SE**	**82**	**50**	**24**	**8**	**272**	**245**	108
**3**	**y – New Jersey Devils**	**AT**	**82**	**51**	**27**	**4**	**244**	**209**	106
**4**	**Pittsburgh Penguins**	**AT**	**82**	**45**	**28**	**9**	**264**	**239**	99
**5**	**Philadelphia Flyers**	**AT**	**82**	**44**	**27**	**11**	**264**	**238**	99
**6**	**Carolina Hurricanes**	**SE**	**82**	**45**	**30**	**7**	**239**	**226**	97
**7**	**New York Rangers**	**AT**	**82**	**43**	**30**	**9**	**210**	**218**	95
**8**	**Montreal Canadiens**	**NE**	**82**	**41**	**30**	**11**	**249**	**247**	93
8.5
9	Florida Panthers	SE	82	41	30	11	234	231	93
10	Buffalo Sabres	NE	82	41	32	9	250	234	91
11	Ottawa Senators	NE	82	36	35	11	217	237	83
12	Toronto Maple Leafs	NE	82	34	35	13	250	293	81
13	Atlanta Thrashers	SE	82	35	41	6	257	280	76
14	Tampa Bay Lightning	SE	82	24	40	18	210	279	66
15	New York Islanders	AT	82	26	47	9	201	279	61

bold – qualified for playoffs, y – division winner, z – placed first in conference (and division)

AT – Atlantic Division, NE – Northeast Division, SE – Southeast Division

== Schedule and results ==
- Green background indicates win (2 points).
- Red background indicates regulation loss (0 points).
- White background indicates overtime/shootout loss (1 point).

2008–09 Game Log

Preseason: 1–5–0 (Home: 0–3–0; Road: 1–2–0)
**Date**	**Visitor**	**Score**	**Home**	**OT**	**Decision**	**Attendance**
September 25	Atlanta	4 - 2	Nashville		Pavelec	10,558
September 26	Atlanta	4 - 9	St. Louis		Hedberg	12,526
September 28	Atlanta	0 - 4	Detroit		Lehtonen	17,714
October 1	Detroit	4 - 1	Atlanta		Lehtonen	10,817
October 3	Nashville	6 - 4	Atlanta		Hedberg	6,753
October 4	St. Louis	4 - 1	Atlanta		Lehtonen	7,648

October: 2–6–2 (Home: 2–3–0; Road: 0–3–2)
#	**Date**	**Visitor**	**Score**	**Home**	**OT**	**Decision**	**Attendance**	**Record**	**Pts**
1	October 10	Washington	4 - 7	Atlanta		Lehtonen	18,545	1-0-0	2
2	October 11	Atlanta	2 - 3	Florida	OT	Lehtonen	17,085	1-0-1	3
3	October 14	Minnesota	4 - 2	Atlanta		Lehtonen	11,843	1-1-1	3
4	October 16	New Jersey	1 - 0	Atlanta		Lehtonen	11,293	1-2-1	3
5	October 18	Buffalo	2 - 3	Atlanta	SO	Lehtonen	14,091	2-2-1	5
6	October 21	Atlanta	2 - 3	Tampa Bay	OT	Lehtonen	13,922	2-2-2	6
7	October 24	Atlanta	3 - 5	Detroit		Lehtonen	20,066	2-3-2	6
8	October 25	Atlanta	4 - 5	Boston		Hedberg	16,044	2-4-2	6
9	October 28	Philadelphia	7 - 0	Atlanta		Lehtonen	13,207	3-5-2	6
10	October 30	Atlanta	2 - 3	NY Rangers		Lehtonen	18,200	2-6-2	6

November: 6–6–1 (Home: 3–3–1; Road: 3–3–0)
#	**Date**	**Visitor**	**Score**	**Home**	**OT**	**Decision**	**Attendance**	**Record**	**Pts**
11	November 1	Atlanta	1 - 5	New Jersey		Hedberg	14,958	2-7-2	6
12	November 2	Florida	3 - 5	Atlanta		Pavelec	10,584	3-7-2	8
13	November 6	NY Islanders	3 - 4	Atlanta		Pavelec	14,122	4-7-2	10
14	November 7	Atlanta	5 - 4	Buffalo	OT	Hedberg	18,466	5-7-2	12
15	November 9	Atlanta	5 - 2	Carolina		Hedberg	12,398	6-7-2	14
16	November 14	Carolina	3 - 2	Atlanta		Hedberg	16,128	7-7-2	16
17	November 16	Atlanta	3 - 4	Philadelphia		Hedberg	19,437	7-8-2	16
18	November 20	Pittsburgh	3 - 2	Atlanta		Pavelec	13,391	7-9-2	16
19	November 22	Columbus	2 - 0	Atlanta		Pavelec	15,561	7-10-2	16
20	November 25	Atlanta	6 - 3	Toronto		Hedberg	19,297	8-10-2	18
21	November 26	Atlanta	3 - 5	Washington		Pavelec	18,277	8-11-2	18
22	November 28	Nashville	4 - 3	Atlanta	OT	Hedberg	15,022	8-11-3	19
23	November 30	St. Louis	4 - 2	Atlanta		Pavelec	14,078	8-12-3	19

December: 4–9–2 (Home: 1–5–1; Road: 3–4–1)
#	**Date**	**Visitor**	**Score**	**Home**	**OT**	**Decision**	**Attendance**	**Record**	**Pts**
24	December 2	Atlanta	4 - 5	Montreal		Hedberg	21,273	8-13-3	19
25	December 3	Atlanta	1 - 5	Ottawa		Pavelec	17,215	8-14-3	19
26	December 6	Atlanta	5 - 1	NY Islanders		Hedberg	14,174	9-14-3	21
27	December 10	NY Rangers	3 - 2	Atlanta	OT	Hedberg	13,704	9-14-4	22
28	December 12	Boston	7 - 3	Atlanta		Hedberg	15,818	9-15-4	22
29	December 13	Atlanta	2 - 4	Boston		Hedberg	17,565	9-16-4	22
30	December 16	Atlanta	4 - 1	Ottawa		Pavelec	18,746	10-16-4	24
31	December 18	Pittsburgh	6 - 3	Atlanta		Pavelec	15,124	10-17-4	24
32	December 20	Tampa Bay	3 - 4	Atlanta		Lehtonen	14,395	11-17-4	26
33	December 22	Toronto	6 - 2	Atlanta		Lehtonen	16,413	11-18-4	26
34	December 23	Atlanta	4 - 2	NY Islanders		Hedberg	14,227	12-18-4	28
35	December 26	Carolina	5 - 4	Atlanta		Hedberg	16,012	12-19-4	28
36	December 28	Boston	2 - 1	Atlanta		Lehtonen	16,835	12-20-4	28
37	December 30	Atlanta	3 - 4	Toronto	OT	Hedberg	19,260	12-20-5	29
38	December 31	Atlanta	1 - 3	Carolina		Lehtonen	18,137	12-21-5	29

January: 5–8–0 (Home: 3-3–0; Road: 2–5–0)
#	**Date**	**Visitor**	**Score**	**Home**	**OT**	**Decision**	**Attendance**	**Record**	**Pts**
39	January 2	Vancouver	3 - 4	Atlanta	SO	Lehtonen	14,902	13-21-5	31
40	January 4	Tampa Bay	4 - 1	Atlanta		Lehtonen	10,750	13-22-5	31
41	January 6	Atlanta	1 - 3	Pittsburgh		Lehtonen	16,975	13-23-5	31
42	January 8	Atlanta	4 - 0	New Jersey		Lehtonen	16,489	14-23-5	33
43	January 10	Atlanta	4 - 8	Florida		Lehtonen	14,323	14-24-5	33
44	January 14	Ottawa	2 - 3	Atlanta		Lehtonen	14,163	14-25-5	33
45	January 16	Toronto	4 - 3	Atlanta	OT	Lehtonen	15,619	15-25-5	35
46	January 17	Atlanta	7 - 2	Nashville		Lehtonen	17,113	16-25-5	37
47	January 20	Montreal	4 - 2	Atlanta		Lehtonen	13,076	17-25-5	39
48	January 21	Atlanta	3 - 5	Philadelphia		Lehtonen	19,766	17-26-5	39
49	January 27	Atlanta	0 - 2	Dallas		Lehtonen	16,726	17-27-5	39
50	January 29	NY Islanders	4 - 5	Atlanta		Hedberg	15,200	17-28-5	39
51	January 31	Atlanta	0 - 2	Carolina		Lehtonen	16,215	17-29-5	39

February: 6–5–1 (Home: 2–3–0; Road: 4–2–1)
#	**Date**	**Visitor**	**Score**	**Home**	**OT**	**Decision**	**Attendance**	**Record**	**Pts**
52	February 3	Atlanta	2 - 1	NY Rangers		Lehtonen	18,200	18-29-5	41
53	February 6	New Jersey	1 - 5	Atlanta		Lehtonen	17,069	18-30-5	41
54	February 8	Philadelphia	2 - 3	Atlanta		Hedberg	14,175	18-31-5	41
55	February 10	Atlanta	3 - 1	Tampa Bay		Lehtonen	13,490	19-31-5	43
56	February 11	Chicago	1 - 3	Atlanta		Lehtonen	14,029	19-32-5	43
57	February 15	Atlanta	8 - 4	Anaheim		Lehtonen	17,228	20-32-5	45
58	February 16	Atlanta	7 - 6	Los Angeles	SO	Hedberg	18,118	21-32-5	47
59	February 19	Atlanta	3 - 4	Phoenix	SO	Lehtonen	15,341	21-32-6	48
60	February 21	Atlanta	1 - 3	San Jose		Lehtonen	17,496	21-33-6	48
61	February 24	Colorado	4 - 3	Atlanta		Lehtonen	12,101	22-33-6	50
62	February 26	Atlanta	3 - 4	Washington		Lehtonen	18,277	22-34-6	50
63	February 28	Carolina	5 - 3	Atlanta		Lehtonen	17,796	23-34-6	52

March: 9–4–0 (Home: 5–2–0; Road: 4–2–0)
#	**Date**	**Visitor**	**Score**	**Home**	**OT**	**Decision**	**Attendance**	**Record**	**Pts**
64	March 3	Florida	3 - 4	Atlanta		Lehtonen	10,329	23-35-6	52
65	March 6	Montreal	2 - 0	Atlanta		Lehtonen	14,813	24-35-6	54
66	March 8	Calgary	5 - 2	Atlanta		Lehtonen	13,469	25-35-6	56
67	March 10	Atlanta	3 - 0	Colorado		Lehtonen	13,608	26-35-6	58
68	March 12	Atlanta	4 - 3	Edmonton	OT	Hedberg	16,389	27-35-6	60
69	March 14	Atlanta	4 -3	Buffalo	SO	Hedberg	18,690	28-35-6	62
70	March 16	Washington	5 - 1	Atlanta		Lehtonen	13,336	29-35-6	64
71	March 17	Atlanta	2 - 6	Pittsburgh		Hedberg	17,088	29-36-6	64
72	March 20	Detroit	3 - 6	Atlanta		Lehtonen	18,545	29-37-6	64
73	March 21	Atlanta	4 - 3	Tampa Bay	SO	Hedberg	15,391	30-37-6	66
74	March 24	Atlanta	3 - 6	Montreal		Lehtonen	21,273	30-38-6	66
75	March 26	NY Rangers	5 - 4	Atlanta	SO	Hedberg	13,157	31-38-6	68
76	March 28	Ottawa	6 - 3	Atlanta		Hedberg	17,053	32-38-6	70

April: 3–3–0 (Home: 2–2–0; Road: 1–1–0)
#	**Date**	**Visitor**	**Score**	**Home**	**OT**	**Decision**	**Attendance**	**Record**	**Pts**
77	April 1	Buffalo	2 - 3	Atlanta	OT	Hedberg	15,038	33-38-6	72
78	April 3	Atlanta	3 - 1	Florida		Hedberg	15,945	34-38-6	74
79	April 5	Atlanta	4 - 6	Washington		Hedberg	18,277	34-39-6	74
80	April 7	Washington	4 - 2	Atlanta		Pavelec	16,027	34-40-6	74
81	April 9	Florida	3 - 2	Atlanta		Hedberg	15,738	34-41-6	74
82	April 11	Tampa Bay	2 - 6	Atlanta		Lehtonen	17,122	35-41-6	76

=== Record vs. Opponents ===
Team	Points	Record
New Jersey*	106	1–3–0
NY Islanders	61	3–1–0
NY Rangers	95	2–1–1
Philadelphia	99	0–4–0
Pittsburgh	99	0–4–0
Boston*	116	0–4–0
Buffalo	91	4–0–0
Montreal	93	2–2–0
Ottawa	83	2–2–0
Toronto	81	2–1–1
**Carolina**	97	3–3–0
**Florida**	93	2–3–1
**Tampa Bay**	66	4–1–1
**Washington***	108	2–4–0
Chicago	104	0–1–0
Columbus	92	0–1–0
Detroit*	112	0–2–0
Nashville	88	1–0–1
St. Louis	92	0–1–0
Calgary	98	1–0–0
Colorado	69	2–0–0
Edmonton	85	1–0–0
Minnesota	89	0–1–0
Vancouver*	100	1–0–0
Anaheim	91	1–0–0
Dallas	83	0–1–0
Los Angeles	79	1–0–0
Phoenix	79	0–0–1
San Jose*	117	0–1–0

Notes: * denotes division winner; teams in bold are in the Southeast Division; teams in italics qualified for the playoffs; points refer to the points achieved by the team whom the Thrashers played against

= Member of the Atlantic Division
= Member of the Northeast Division
= Member of the Southeast Division
= Member of the Central Division
= Member of the Northeast Division
= Member of the Pacific Division

== Playoffs ==
The Atlanta Thrashers failed to qualify for the 2009 NHL Playoffs.

== Player statistics ==
=== Skaters ===
Regular season

Player	GP	G	A	Pts	+/−	PIM
Ilya Kovalchuk	79	43	48	91	-12	50
Vyacheslav Kozlov	82	26	50	76	-14	44
Todd White	82	22	51	73	-9	24
Bryan Little	79	31	20	51	-5	24
Colby Armstrong	82	22	18	40	+5	75
Ron Hainsey	81	6	33	39	-16	32
Rich Peverley^{†}	39	13	22	35	+16	18
Tobias Enstrom	82	5	27	32	+14	52
Marty Reasoner	79	14	16	30	+11	36
Eric Perrin	78	7	16	23	-2	36
Erik Christensen^{‡}	47	5	14	19	-7	14
Zach Bogosian	47	9	10	19	+11	47
Jason Williams^{‡}	41	7	11	18	-9	8
Jim Slater	60	8	10	18	0	52
Niclas Havelid^{‡}	63	2	13	15	+4	42
Mathieu Schneider^{‡}	44	4	11	15	-10	50
Chris Thorburn	82	7	8	15	-10	104
Eric Boulton	76	3	10	13	-3	176
Nathan Oystrick	53	4	8	12	-2	50
Joey Crabb	29	4	5	9	-2	28
Colin Stuart	33	5	3	8	+3	18
Garnet Exelby	59	0	7	7	-2	120
Boris Valabik	50	0	5	5	-14	132
Anssi Salmela^{†}	9	1	2	3	0	2
Joe Motzko	6	1	0	1	+1	0
Brett Sterling	6	1	0	1	-3	2
Scott Lehman	1	0	0	0	0	0
Clay Wilson^{†}	2	0	0	0	-1	0
Jordan LaVallee	2	0	0	0	-1	0
Grant Lewis	1	0	0	0	0	0
Spencer Machacek	2	0	0	0	0	0

=== Goaltenders ===
Regular season

Player	GP	Min	W	L	OT	GA	GAA	SA	SV	Sv%	SO
Kari Lehtonen	46	2624	19	22	3	134	3.06	1498	1364	.911	3
Johan Hedberg	33	1716	13	12	3	100	3.49	875	775	.886	0
Ondrej Pavelec	12	599	3	7	0	36	3.60	301	265	.880	0

^{†}Denotes player spent time with another team before joining Thrashers. Stats reflect season totals.
^{‡}Traded mid-season
underline/italics denotes franchise record

Note:

Pos = Position;GP = Games played; G = Goals; A = Assists; Pts = Points; PIM = Penalty minutes; +/- = Plus/minus; PPG = Power-play goals; SHG = Short-handed goals; GWG = Game-winning goals
Pos = Position;GP = Games played; Min, TOI = Minutes played; W = Wins; L = Losses; T,T/OT = Ties; OTL = Overtime losses; GA = Goals-against; GAA = Goals-against average; SO = Shutouts; SA = Shots against; SV = Shots saved;SV% = Save percentage;

== Awards and records ==
=== Milestones ===
Regular Season
Player	Milestone	Reached
Zach Bogosian	1st NHL Game	October 10, 2008
Colby Armstrong	200th NHL Game	October 10, 2008
Garnet Exelby	300th NHL Game	October 11, 2008
Nathan Oystrick	1st NHL Game	October 14, 2008
Mathieu Schneider	1,200th NHL Game	October 14, 2008
Jason Williams	300th NHL Game	October 16, 2008
Todd White	500th NHL Game	November 2, 2008
Bryan Little	1st NHL Hat Trick	December 26, 2008
Kari Lehtonen	200th NHL Game	March 16, 2009
Eric Perrin	100 NHL Point	March 24, 2009

== Transactions ==
=== Trades ===
Date	Details
September 26, 2008	To Anaheim Ducks Ken Klee; Brad Larsen; Chad Painchaud	To Atlanta Thrashers Mathieu Schneider
January 13, 2009	To New York Islanders Junior Lessard	To Atlanta Thrashers Brett Skinner
January 14, 2009	To Columbus Blue Jackets Jason Williams	To Atlanta Thrashers Clay Wilson; 6th-round pick in 2009 – David Pacan
February 16, 2009	To Montreal Canadiens Mathieu Schneider; Conditional pick in 2009 (condition satisfied) – Joonas Nattinen	To Atlanta Thrashers 2nd-round pick in 2009 – Jeremy Morin; 3rd-round pick in 2010 – Julian Melchiori
March 2, 2009	To New Jersey Devils Niclas Havelid; Myles Stoesz	To Atlanta Thrashers Anssi Salmela

=== Free agents ===
Player	Former team	Contract Terms

Player	New team
Bobby Holik	New Jersey Devils
Mark Recchi	Tampa Bay Lightning
Jason Krog	Vancouver Canucks

=== Claimed from waivers ===
Player	Former team	Date claimed off waivers
Rich Peverley	Nashville Predators	January 10, 2009

== Draft picks ==
Atlanta's picks at the 2008 NHL entry draft in Ottawa, Ontario.

Round	#	Player	Position	Nationality	College/Junior/Club team (League)
1	3	Zach Bogosian	(D)	United States	Peterborough Petes (OHL)
1	29 (from Pittsburgh)	Daultan Leveille	(C)	Canada	St. Catharines Falcons (GOJHL)
3	64	Danick Paquette	(RW)	Canada	Lewiston Maineiacs (QMJHL)
4	94	Vinny Saponari	(RW)	United States	U.S. National Team Development Program (NAHL)
5	124	Nicklas Lasu	(LW)	Sweden	Frölunda HC (Sweden Jr.)
6	154	Chris Carrozzi	(G)	Canada	Mississauga St. Michael's Majors (OHL)
7	184	Zach Redmond	(D)	United States	Ferris State University (CCHA)

== See also ==
- 2008–09 NHL season
