= Nate Raduns =

American ice hockey player

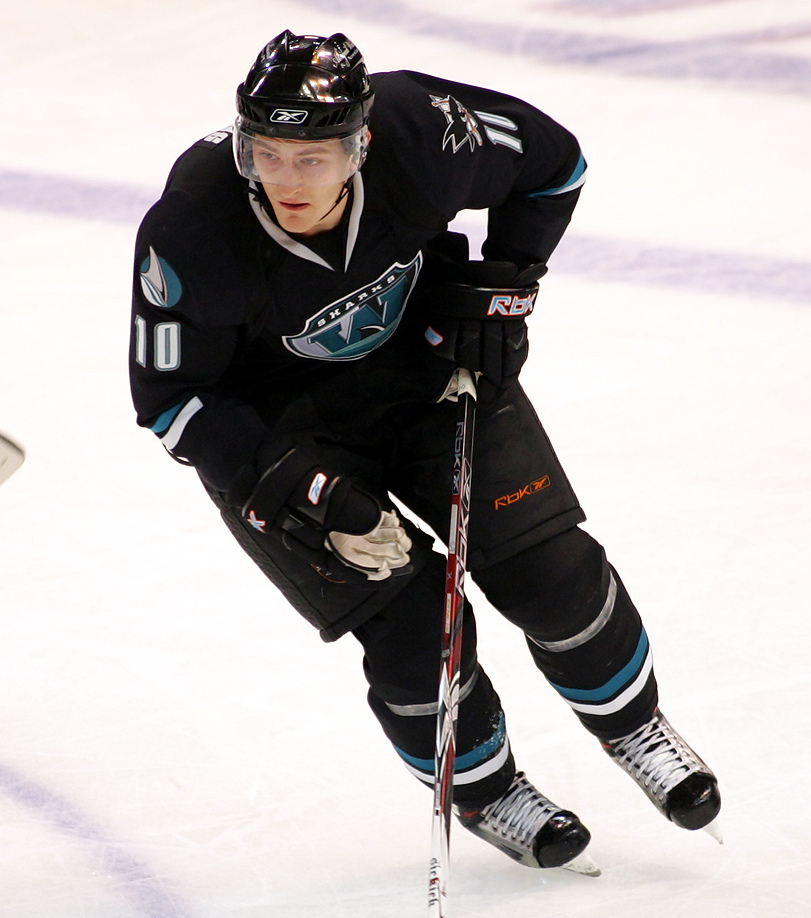
- Raduns with the Worcester Sharks in 2007
- Born: May 17, 1984 (age 42) Sauk Rapids, Minnesota
- Height: 6 ft 3 in (191 cm)
- Weight: 205 lb (93 kg; 14 st 9 lb)
- Position: Right wing
- Shot: Right
- Played for: Philadelphia Flyers; SG Pontebba
- National team: United States
- NHL draft: Undrafted
- Playing career: 2007–2010

Nathan Robert Raduns (born May 17, 1984) is an American former professional ice hockey player. He played one game in the National Hockey League (NHL) with the Philadelphia Flyers during the 2008–09 season. During his professional career he also played two seasons in the American Hockey League (AHL) with the Worcester Sharks and Philadelphia Phantoms, and one season in Italy with SG Pontebba.

== Playing career ==
Undrafted, Raduns was a standout high school player with Sauk Rapids-Rice High School until his sophomore season, when he left to play with the USA Hockey National Team Development Program. As a high school senior, Raduns then opted to move to the River City Lancers of the USHL in 2002-03 before being recruited to play collegiate hockey with St. Cloud State University of the Western Collegiate Hockey Association. After his four-year career with the Huskies he was invited to the San Jose Sharks rookie training camp for the 2007–08 season. He was then reassigned to AHL affiliate, the Worcester Sharks, where he remained for the duration of the year.

On July 1, 2008, Raduns signed a one-year contract with the Philadelphia Flyers prior to the 2008–09 season. He was then assigned to AHL affiliate, the Philadelphia Phantoms and fulfilled a checking-line role, scoring 14 points in 70 games. On November 6, 2008, he made his NHL debut appearing in 1 game with the Flyers in a 4-1 defeat to the Ottawa Senators.

Raduns signed a contract with SG Pontebba of the Italian Serie A on July 7, 2009, for the 2009–10 season.

== Career statistics ==
=== Regular season and playoffs ===
			Regular season					Playoffs
Season	Team	League	GP	G	A	Pts	PIM	GP	G	A	Pts	PIM
2001–02	U.S. National Development Team	USDP	23	3	7	10	21	—	—	—	—	—
2002–03	River City Lancers	USHL	48	5	17	22	50	11	1	3	4	8
2003–04	St. Cloud State University	WCHA	34	4	7	11	40	—	—	—	—	—
2004–05	St. Cloud State University	WCHA	28	4	8	12	32	—	—	—	—	—
2005–06	St. Cloud State University	WCHA	41	5	10	15	50	—	—	—	—	—
2006–07	St. Cloud State University	WCHA	40	6	6	12	53	—	—	—	—	—
2007–08	Worcester Sharks	AHL	56	12	15	27	42	—	—	—	—	—
2008–09	Philadelphia Flyers	NHL	1	0	0	0	0	—	—	—	—	—
2008–09	Philadelphia Phantoms	AHL	70	5	9	14	71	3	0	0	0	2
2009–10	SG Pontebba	ITA	40	13	25	38	44	7	3	6	9	14
NHL totals			1	0	0	0	0	—	—	—	—	—
AHL totals			126	17	24	41	113	3	0	0	0	2

=== International ===
Nate Raduns
Medal record

Representing United States

Ice hockey

IIHF U18 Championships
Gold medal – first place	2002 Piešťany	

Year	Team	Event	GP	G	A	Pts	PIM
2002	United States	WJC18	8	0	1	1	2
Junior totals			8	0	1	1	2

== See also ==
- List of players who played only one game in the NHL
