= David Sloane =

American ice hockey player

- Born: April 6, 1985 (age 41) Ambler, Pennsylvania, U.S.
- Height: 6 ft 4 in (193 cm)
- Weight: 220 lb (100 kg; 15 st 10 lb)
- Position: Defense / Right wing
- Shot: Right
- Played for: Philadelphia Flyers (NHL); Philadelphia Phantoms (AHL); Kalamazoo Wings (ECHL); Adirondack Phantoms (AHL); Cincinnati Cyclones (ECHL); Elmira Jackals (ECHL); Binghamton Senators (AHL)
- NHL draft: Undrafted
- Playing career: 2009–2011

David J. Sloane (born April 6, 1985) is an American former professional ice hockey defensemen and right winger. He played in one National Hockey League (NHL) game with the Philadelphia Flyers during the 2008–09 season. As a youth, he played in the 1999 Quebec International Pee-Wee Hockey Tournament with the Philadelphia Flyers minor ice hockey team.

== Career statistics ==
			Regular season					Playoffs
Season	Team	League	GP	G	A	Pts	PIM	GP	G	A	Pts	PIM
2004–05	Chicago Steel	USHL	17	0	1	1	12	—	—	—	—	—
2005–06	Colgate Raiders	ECAC	27	4	1	5	16	—	—	—	—	—
2006–07	Colgate Raiders	ECAC	35	4	5	9	27	—	—	—	—	—
2007–08	Colgate Raiders	ECAC	32	2	3	5	20	—	—	—	—	—
2008–09	Colgate Raiders	ECAC	35	0	4	4	37	—	—	—	—	—
2008–09	Philadelphia Flyers	NHL	1	0	0	0	0	—	—	—	—	—
2008–09	Philadelphia Phantoms	AHL	1	0	0	0	2	—	—	—	—	—
2009–10	Kalamazoo Wings	ECHL	5	0	2	2	4	—	—	—	—	—
2009–10	Adirondack Phantoms	AHL	20	0	1	1	23	—	—	—	—	—
2010–11	Cincinnati Cyclones	ECHL	7	0	0	0	2	—	—	—	—	—
2010–11	Elmira Jackals	ECHL	18	0	1	1	12	2	0	0	0	0
2010–11	Binghamton Senators	AHL	2	0	0	0	4	6	0	0	0	0
ECHL totals			30	0	3	3	18	2	0	0	0	0
AHL totals			23	0	1	1	29	6	0	0	0	0
NHL totals			1	0	0	0	0	—	—	—	—	—

== See also ==
- List of players who played only one game in the NHL
