= 2008–09 Washington Capitals season =

NHL hockey team season

2008–09 Washington Capitals
- Southeast Division champions
- Division: 1st Southeast
- Conference: 2nd Eastern
- 2008–09 record: 50–24–8
- Home record: 29–9–3
- Road record: 21–15–5
- Goals for: 272
- Goals against: 245

Team information
- General manager: George McPhee
- Coach: Bruce Boudreau
- Captain: Chris Clark
- Alternate captains: Sergei Fedorov; Alexander Ovechkin
- Arena: Verizon Center
- Average attendance: 17,943 (98%)

Team leaders
- Goals: Alexander Ovechkin (56)
- Assists: Nicklas Backstrom (66)
- Points: Alexander Ovechkin (110)
- Penalty minutes: Donald Brashear (121)
- Plus/minus: Alexander Semin (+25)
- Wins: Jose Theodore (32)
- Goals against average: Semyon Varlamov (2.37)

The 2008–09 Washington Capitals season was the team's 35th in the National Hockey League (NHL). The Capitals finished the regular season with a record of 50–24–8 and a team-record 108 points, and they won their second consecutive Southeast Division championship. They defeated the New York Rangers in the first round of the 2009 Stanley Cup playoffs 4–3, overcoming a 3–1 series deficit. The Capitals were then defeated by the eventual champion Pittsburgh Penguins in the Eastern Conference Semifinals in seven games.

== Pre-season ==
Schedule/Results from capitals.nhl.com

Opponent	Result	Score
@ Carolina Hurricanes	W	4-1
vs Carolina Hurricanes	W	5-2
@ Boston Bruins	W	4-3
@ New Jersey Devils	W	3-2
@ Philadelphia Flyers	L	1-2
vs Philadelphia Flyers	W	5-1
vs Boston Bruins	OTL	4-5

== Regular season ==
=== Division standings ===
Southeast Division
		GP	W	L	OTL	GF	GA	Pts
**1**	**y – Washington Capitals**	**82**	**50**	**24**	**8**	**272**	**245**	**108**
**2**	**Carolina Hurricanes**	**82**	**45**	**30**	**7**	**239**	**226**	**97**
3	Florida Panthers	82	41	30	11	234	231	93
4	Atlanta Thrashers	82	35	41	6	257	280	76
5	Tampa Bay Lightning	82	24	40	18	210	279	66

=== Conference standings ===
Eastern Conference
R		Div	GP	W	L	OTL	GF	GA	Pts
**1**	**z – Boston Bruins**	**NE**	**82**	**53**	**19**	**10**	**274**	**196**	116
**2**	**y – Washington Capitals**	**SE**	**82**	**50**	**24**	**8**	**272**	**245**	108
**3**	**y – New Jersey Devils**	**AT**	**82**	**51**	**27**	**4**	**244**	**209**	106
**4**	**Pittsburgh Penguins**	**AT**	**82**	**45**	**28**	**9**	**264**	**239**	99
**5**	**Philadelphia Flyers**	**AT**	**82**	**44**	**27**	**11**	**264**	**238**	99
**6**	**Carolina Hurricanes**	**SE**	**82**	**45**	**30**	**7**	**239**	**226**	97
**7**	**New York Rangers**	**AT**	**82**	**43**	**30**	**9**	**210**	**218**	95
**8**	**Montreal Canadiens**	**NE**	**82**	**41**	**30**	**11**	**249**	**247**	93
8.5
9	Florida Panthers	SE	82	41	30	11	234	231	93
10	Buffalo Sabres	NE	82	41	32	9	250	234	91
11	Ottawa Senators	NE	82	36	35	11	217	237	83
12	Toronto Maple Leafs	NE	82	34	35	13	250	293	81
13	Atlanta Thrashers	SE	82	35	41	6	257	280	76
14	Tampa Bay Lightning	SE	82	24	40	18	210	279	66
15	New York Islanders	AT	82	26	47	9	201	279	61

bold – qualified for playoffs, y – division winner, z – placed first in conference (and division)

AT – Atlantic Division, NE – Northeast Division, SE – Southeast Division

== Schedule and results ==
Full schedule, results, and recaps at capitals.nhl.com

- Green background indicates win. (2 points)
- Red indicates loss. (0 points)
- White background indicates overtime/shootout loss (1 point).

2008–09 Game log

October: 5–3–1 (home: 3–0–1; road: 2–3–0)
#	Date	Visitor	Score	Home	OT	Decision	Attendance	Record	Pts
1	10	Washington	4 - 7	Atlanta Thrashers		Johnson	18,545	0–1–0	0
2	11	Chicago Blackhawks	2 - 4	Washington		Theodore	18,277	1-1-0	2
3	13	Vancouver Canucks	1 - 5	Washington		Johnson	16,847	2-1-0	4
4	16	Washington	4 - 3	Pittsburgh Penguins		Theodore	17,030	3-1-0	6
5	18	New Jersey Devils	4 - 3	Washington	SO	Theodore	17,904	3-1-1	7
6	21	Washington	1 - 2	Calgary Flames		Theodore	19,289	3-2-1	7
7	23	Washington	1 - 2	Phoenix Coyotes		Theodore	14,722	3-3-1	7
8	25	Washington	6 - 5	Dallas Stars	OT	Theodore	18,532	4-3-1	9
9	28	Nashville Predators	3 - 4	Washington	SO	Theodore	17,011	5-3-1	11

November: 8-5–2 (home: 6–0–0; road: 2-5–2)
#	Date	Visitor	Score	Home	OT	Decision	Attendance	Record	Pts
10	1	Washington	0 - 5	Buffalo Sabres		Theodore	18,690	5-4-1	11
11	4	Washington	1 - 2	Ottawa Senators	OT	Johnson	18,485	5-4-2	12
12	6	Carolina Hurricanes	2 - 3	Washington		Johnson	17,874	6-4-2	14
13	8	New York Rangers	1 - 3	Washington		Johnson	17,948	7-4-2	16
14	10	Tampa Bay Lightning	2 - 4	Washington		Johnson	17,932	8-4-2	18
15	12	Washington	5 - 1	Carolina Hurricanes		Johnson	14,261	9-4-2	20
16	14	New Jersey Devils	1 - 3	Washington		Theodore	18,277	10-4-2	22
17	15	Washington	5 - 6	New Jersey Devils	SO	Theodore	17,051	10-4-3	23
18	19	Washington	6 - 4	Anaheim Ducks		Theodore	16,076	11-4-3	25
19	20	Washington	2 - 5	Los Angeles Kings		Johnson	17,428	11-5-3	25
20	22	Washington	2 - 7	San Jose Sharks		Johnson	17,496	11-6-3	25
21	24	Washington	3 - 4	Minnesota Wild		Theodore	18,568	11-7-3	25
22	26	Atlanta Thrashers	3 - 5	Washington		Theodore	18,277	12-7-3	27
23	28	Montreal Canadiens	0 - 3	Washington		Theodore	18,277	13-7-3	29
24	29	Washington	0 - 3	Columbus Blue Jackets		Johnson	17,448	13-8-3	29

December: 11–3–0 (home: 6–1–0; road: 5–2–0)
#	Date	Visitor	Score	Home	OT	Decision	Attendance	Record	Pts
25	2	Florida Panthers	5 - 3	Washington		Theodore	16,792	13-9-3	29
26	4	New York Islanders	2 - 5	Washington		Johnson	18,130	14-9-3	31
27	6	Washington	2 - 1	Toronto Maple Leafs		Johnson	19,416	15-9-3	33
28	7	Washington	1 - 3	Carolina Hurricanes		Theodore	15,308	15-10-3	33
29	10	Boston Bruins	1 - 3	Washington		Johnson	17,697	16-10-3	35
30	12	Ottawa Senators	1 - 5	Washington		Johnson	17,973	17-10-3	37
31	13	Washington	2 - 1	Montreal Canadiens		Varlamov	21,273	18-10-3	39
32	16	Washington	5 - 4	New York Islanders	OT	Johnson	11,655	19-10-3	41
33	18	St. Louis Blues	2 - 4	Washington		Varlamov	18,277	20-10-3	43
34	20	Washington	1 - 7	Philadelphia Flyers		Theodore	19,897	20-11-3	43
35	23	Washington	5 - 4	New York Rangers	OT	Theodore	18,200	21-11-3	45
36	26	Buffalo Sabres	2 - 3	Washington		Theodore	18,277	22-11-3	47
37	28	Toronto Maple Leafs	1 - 4	Washington		Theodore	18,277	23-11-3	49
38	30	Washington	4 - 2	Buffalo Sabres		Theodore	18,690	24-11-3	51

January: 7–4–1 (home: 5–2–0; road: 2–2–1)
#	Date	Visitor	Score	Home	OT	Decision	Attendance	Record	Pts
39	1	Tampa Bay Lightning	4 - 7	Washington		Johnson	18,277	25-11-3	53
40	3	New York Rangers	1 - 2	Washington		Theodore	18,277	26-11-3	55
41	6	Philadelphia Flyers	1 - 2	Washington	SO	Theodore	18,277	27-11-3	57
42	9	Columbus Blue Jackets	3 - 0	Washington		Theodore	18,277	27-12-3	57
43	10	Washington	4 - 5	Montreal Canadiens		Johnson	21,273	27-13-3	57
44	13	Edmonton Oilers	5 - 2	Washington		Theodore	17,948	27-14-3	57
45	14	Washington	6 - 3	Pittsburgh Penguins		Theodore	16,975	28-14-3	59
46	17	Boston Bruins	1 - 2	Washington		Theodore	18,277	29-14-3	61
47	19	Washington	2 - 1	New York Islanders	OT	Theodore	15,221	30-14-3	63
48	20	Washington	2 - 3	Ottawa Senators		Theodore	20,125	30-15-3	63
49	27	Washington	2 - 3	Boston Bruins	OT	Theodore	17,565	30-15-4	64
50	31	Detroit Red Wings	2 - 4	Washington		Theodore	18,277	31-15-4	66

February: 9–3–1 (home: 5–3–0; road: 4–0–1)
#	Date	Visitor	Score	Home	OT	Decision	Attendance	Record	Pts
51	1	Ottawa Senators	4 - 7	Washington		Johnson	18,277	32-15-4	68
52	3	Washington	5 - 2	New Jersey Devils		Theodore	14,018	33-15-4	70
53	5	Los Angeles Kings	5 - 4	Washington		Theodore	18,277	33-16-4	70
54	7	Florida Panthers	1 - 3	Washington		Theodore	18,277	34-16-4	72
55	11	Washington	4-5	New York Rangers	SO	Theodore	18,200	34-16-5	73
56	14	Washington	5-1	Tampa Bay Lightning		Neuvirth	17,249	35-16-5	75
57	15	Washington	4 - 2	Florida Panthers		Theodore	17,279	36-16-5	77
58	18	Montreal Canadiens	4 - 5	Washington	SO	Theodore	18,277	37-16-5	79
59	20	Colorado Avalanche	4 - 1	Washington		Theodore	18,277	37-17-5	79
60	22	Pittsburgh Penguins	2 - 5	Washington		Theodore	18,277	38-17-5	81
61	24	Philadelphia Flyers	4 - 2	Washington		Theodore	18,277	38-18-5	81
62	26	Atlanta Thrashers	3 - 4	Washington		Neuvirth	18,277	39-18-5	83
63	28	Washington	4 - 3	Boston Bruins	OT	Theodore	17,565	40-18-5	85

March: 6–5–2; home: 2–3–1; road: 4–2–1)
#	Date	Visitor	Score	Home	OT	Decision	Attendance	Record	Pts
64	1	Florida Panthers	6 - 2	Washington		Theodore	18,277	40-19-5	85
65	3	Carolina Hurricanes	5 - 2	Washington		Neuvirth	17,903	40-20-5	85
66	5	Toronto Maple Leafs	2 - 1	Washington		Theodore	18,277	40-21-5	85
67	8	Pittsburgh Penguins	4 - 3	Washington	SO	Theodore	18,277	40-21-6	86
68	10	Washington	2 - 1	Nashville Predators	OT	Theodore	20,066	41-21-6	88
69	12	Washington	2 - 1	Philadelphia Flyers		Theodore	14,578	42-21-6	90
70	14	Carolina Hurricanes	4 - 5	Washington	SO	Theodore	18,277	43-21-6	92
71	16	Washington	1 - 5	Atlanta Thrashers		Theodore	13,336	43-22-6	92
72	17	Washington	3 - 0	Florida Panthers		Theodore	16,940	44-22-6	94
73	19	Washington	5 - 2	Tampa Bay Lightning		Varlamov	17,565	45-22-6	96
74	21	Washington	1 - 4	Carolina Hurricanes		Theodore	18,680	45-23-6	96
75	24	Washington	2 - 3	Toronto Maple Leafs	SO	Theodore	19,362	45-23-7	97
76	27	Tampa Bay Lightning	3 - 5	Washington		Theodore	18,277	46-23-7	99

April: 4–1–1 (home: 2–0–1; road: 2–1–0)
#	Date	Visitor	Score	Home	OT	Decision	Attendance	Record	Pts
77	1	New York Islanders	3 - 5	Washington		Theodore	18,277	47-23-7	101
78	3	Buffalo Sabres	5 - 4	Washington	OT	Varlamov	18,277	47-23-8	102
79	5	Atlanta Thrashers	4 - 6	Washington		Theodore	18,277	48-23-8	104
80	7	Washington	4 - 2	Atlanta Thrashers		Varlamov	16,027	49-23-8	106
81	9	Washington	4 - 2	Tampa Bay Lightning		Theodore	18,891	50-23-8	108
82	11	Washington	4 - 7	Florida Panthers		Theodore	18,527	50-24-8	108

Schedule

== Playoffs ==
The Washington Capitals won the Southeast Division and qualified for the playoffs for the second straight season. The Capitals would eventually win the first round against the New York Rangers, in seven games, after trailing the series 3–1 for their first playoff series victory since reaching the Stanley Cup Final in 1998. However, the Capitals would not get past the Pittsburgh Penguins and lost the series in seven games.

Key: Win Loss Clinch Playoff Series Eliminated from playoffs

2009 Stanley Cup Playoffs

Eastern Conference Quarterfinals: vs. (7) New York Rangers
#	Date	Visitor	Score	Home	OT	Decision	Attendance	Series	Recap
1	April 15	NY Rangers	4 - 3	Capitals		Theodore	18,277	Rangers lead 1 - 0
2	April 18	NY Rangers	1 - 0	Capitals		Varlamov	18,277	Rangers lead 2 - 0
3	April 20	Capitals	4 - 0	NY Rangers		Varlamov	18,200	Rangers lead 2 - 1
4	April 22	Capitals	1 - 2	NY Rangers		Varlamov	18,200	Rangers lead 3 - 1
5	April 24	NY Rangers	0 - 4	Capitals		Varlamov	18,277	Rangers lead 3 - 2
6	April 26	Capitals	5 - 3	NY Rangers		Varlamov	18,200	Series tied 3 - 3
7	April 28	NY Rangers	1 - 2	Capitals		Varlamov	18,277	Capitals win series 4 - 3

Eastern Conference Semifinals: vs. (4) Pittsburgh Penguins
#	Date	Visitor	Score	Home	OT	Decision	Attendance	Series	Recap
1	May 2	Penguins	2-3	Capitals		Varlamov	18,277	Capitals lead series 1-0
2	May 4	Penguins	3-4	Capitals		Varlamov	18,277	Capitals lead series 2-0
3	May 6	Capitals	2-3	Penguins	OT	Varlamov	17,132	Capitals lead series 2-1
4	May 8	Capitals	3-5	Penguins		Varlamov	17,132	Series tied 2-2
5	May 9	Penguins	4-3	Capitals	OT	Varlamov	18,277	Penguins lead series 3-2
6	May 11	Capitals	5-4	Penguins	OT	Varlamov	17,132	Series tied 3-3
7	May 13	Penguins	6-2	Capitals		Varlamov	18,277	Penguins win series 4-3

== Player statistics ==
=== Skaters ===
Note: Pos = Position; GP = Games played; G = Goals; A = Assists; Pts = Points; PIM = Penalty minutes; +/- = Plus/minus; PPG = Power-play goals; SHG = Short-handed goals; GWG = Game-winning goals

Regular season

Player	GP	G	A	Pts	+/−	PIM
Alexander Ovechkin	79	56	54	110	+8	72
Nicklas Backstrom	82	22	66	88	+16	46
Alexander Semin	62	34	45	79	+25	77
Mike Green	68	31	42	73	+24	68
Brooks Laich	82	23	30	53	-1	31
Viktor Kozlov	67	13	28	41	-9	16
Tomas Fleischmann	73	19	18	37	-3	20
Sergei Fedorov	52	11	22	33	+4	50
Michael Nylander	72	9	24	33	0	32
Eric Fehr	61	12	13	25	+8	22
Dave Steckel	76	8	11	19	+2	34
Boyd Gordon	63	5	9	14	-4	16
Milan Jurcina	79	3	11	14	+1	68
Tom Poti	52	3	10	13	+3	28
Shaone Morrisonn	72	3	10	13	+4	77
Jeff Schultz	64	1	11	12	+13	21
Matt Bradley	81	5	6	11	-1	59
Chris Clark	32	1	5	6	-3	32
Keith Aucoin	12	2	4	6	+5	4
Tyler Sloan	26	1	4	5	+4	14
Karl Alzner	30	1	4	5	-1	2
Donald Brashear	63	1	3	4	-6	121
John Erskine	52	0	4	4	+1	63
Sami Lepisto	7	0	4	4	-3	6
Bryan Helmer	12	0	3	3	-1	2
Brian Pothier	9	1	2	3	0	4
Alexandre Giroux	12	1	1	2	+4	10
Chris Bourque	8	1	0	1	0	0
Quintin Laing	1	0	0	0	+1	0
Graham Mink	2	0	0	0	0	0
Staffan Kronwall	3	0	0	0	-1	0
Andrew Gordon	1	0	0	0	0	0
Jay Beagle	3	0	0	0	-3	2
Oskar Osala	2	0	0	0	-1	0

Playoffs

Player	GP	G	A	Pts	+/−	PIM
Alexander Ovechkin	14	11	10	21	+10	8
Nicklas Backstrom	14	3	12	15	+3	8
Alexander Semin	14	5	9	14	-1	16
Mike Green	14	1	8	9	-5	12
Sergei Fedorov	14	1	7	8	+1	12
Tom Poti	14	2	5	7	+8	4
Brooks Laich	14	3	4	7	0	10
Matt Bradley	14	2	4	6	+3	0
Viktor Kozlov	14	4	2	6	+5	6
Dave Steckel	14	3	2	5	0	4
Tomas Fleischmann	14	3	1	4	0	4
Boyd Gordon	14	0	3	3	-1	4
Brian Pothier	13	0	2	2	+1	8
Milan Jurcina	14	2	0	2	+6	12
Chris Clark	8	1	0	1	-2	8
John Erskine	12	0	1	1	+1	16
Shaone Morrisonn	14	0	1	1	+1	8
Tyler Sloan	2	0	1	1	+1	0
Donald Brashear	4	0	0	0	0	18
Michael Nylander	3	0	0	0	-1	2
Eric Fehr	9	0	0	0	-3	0
Jeff Schultz	1	0	0	0	-1	0
Jay Beagle	4	0	0	0	-1	0

=== Goaltenders ===
Note: Pos = Position;GP = Games played; Min, TOI = Minutes played; W = Wins; L = Losses; T,T/OT = Ties; OTL = Overtime losses; GA = Goals-against; GAA = Goals-against average; SO = Shutouts; SA = Shots against; SV = Shots saved; SV% = Save percentage;

Regular season

Player	GP	Min	W	L	OT	GA	GAA	SA	SV	Sv%	SO
Jose Theodore	57	3286	32	17	5	157	2.87	1572	1415	.900	2
Brent Johnson	21	1131	12	6	2	53	2.81	579	526	.908	0
Semyon Varlamov	6	328	4	0	1	13	2.37	159	146	.918	0
Michal Neuvirth	5	219	2	1	0	11	3.00	102	91	.892	0

Playoffs

Player	GP	Min	W	L	GA	GAA	SA	SV	Sv%	SO
Semyon Varlamov	13	758	7	6	32	2.53	389	357	.918	2
Jose Theodore	2	96	0	1	6	3.72	33	27	.818	0

^{†}Denotes player spent time with another team before joining Capitals. Stats reflect time with the Capitals only.
^{‡}Traded mid-season
Bold/italics denotes franchise record

== Awards and records ==
=== Trophies and awards ===
- Alexander Ovechkin – Hart Memorial Trophy (Most Valuable Player)
- Alexander Ovechkin – Lester B. Pearson Award (Most Outstanding Player)
- Alexander Ovechkin – Maurice "Rocket" Richard Trophy: (56 goals)
- Alexander Ovechkin – Kharlamov Trophy
- Alexander Ovechkin – NHL First All-Star Team
- Mike Green – NHL First All-Star Team

=== Stars ===
- Alexander Semin – NHL No. 1 Star of the Month (October 2008)
- Alex Ovechkin – NHL No. 1 Star of the Month (November 2008)
- Nicklas Backstrom – NHL No. 1 Star of the Week (Week Ending November 28, 2008)
- Alex Ovechkin – NHL No. 1 Star of the Week (Week Ending December 28, 2008)
- Mike Green – NHL No. 3 Star of the Week (Week Ending February 1, 2009)
- Mike Green – NHL No. 3 Star of the Week (Week Ending February 8, 2009)

=== Records ===
- Mike Green – NHL-record 8-game goal-scoring streak by a defenseman

=== Milestones ===
Regular season
Player	Milestone	Reached
Brent Johnson	100th NHL win	October 13, 2008
Sergei Fedorov	1200th NHL game	October 16, 2008
Milan Jurcina	200th NHL game	October 16, 2008
Tyler Sloan	1st NHL game	October 21, 2008
Sergei Fedorov	474th NHL goal (most by a Russian-born player)	October 25, 2008
Alexander Semin	200th NHL game	October 25, 2008
Tyler Sloan	1st NHL goal	October 25, 2008
Viktor Kozlov	500th NHL point	November 14, 2008
Nicklas Backstrom	100th NHL game	November 19, 2008
Karl Alzner	1st NHL game	November 26, 2008
Alexander Ovechkin	200th NHL goal	February 5, 2009
Mike Green	8-game goal-scoring streak by defenseman (NHL record)	February 14, 2009

== Transactions ==
=== Trades ===
June 20, 2008	To Washington Capitals 1st-round pick (21st overall) in 2008 – Anton Gustafsson	To New Jersey Devils 1st-round pick (23rd overall) in 2008 – Tyler Cuma; 2nd-round pick in 2008 – Patrice Cormier
June 20, 2008	To Washington Capitals 1st-round pick in 2008 – John Carlson	To Philadelphia Flyers Steve Eminger; 3rd-round pick in 2008 – Jacob DeSerres

=== Free agents ===
Player	Former team	Contract terms
Jose Theodore, G	Colorado Avalanche	$9 million, 2 years

Player	New team
Cristobal Huet, G	Chicago Blackhawks
Matt Cooke, LW	Pittsburgh Penguins
Olaf Kolzig, G	Tampa Bay Lightning

=== Claimed from waivers ===
Player	Former team	Date claimed off waivers
Staffan Kronwall, D	Toronto Maple Leafs	February 6, 2009

== Draft picks ==
Washington 's picks at the 2008 NHL entry draft in Ottawa, Ontario.

Round	#	Player	Position	Nationality	College/junior/club team (league)
1	21 (from New Jersey)	Anton Gustafsson	(C)	Sweden	Frölunda HC (Sweden Jr.)
1	27 (from Philadelphia)	John Carlson	(D)	United States	Indiana Ice (USHL)
2	57 (from San Jose)	Eric Mestery	(D)	Canada	Tri-City Americans (WHL)
2	58 (from Philadelphia)	Dmitri Kugryshev	(RW)	Russia	CSKA Moscow (RSL)
4	93 (from Los Angeles)	Braden Holtby	(G)	Canada	Saskatoon Blades (WHL)
5	144	Joel Broda	(C)	Canada	Moose Jaw Warriors (WHL)
6	174	Greg Burke	(LW)	United States	New Hampshire Jr. Monarchs (EJHL)
7	204	Stefan Della Rovere	(LW)	Canada	Barrie Colts (OHL)

== See also ==
- 2008–09 NHL season
- Brett Leonhardt

== Farm teams ==
Hershey Bears of the American Hockey League (AHL) and the South Carolina Stingrays of the ECHL.
