= 2008–09 Tampa Bay Lightning season =

National Hockey League team season

2008–09 Tampa Bay Lightning
- Division: 5th Southeast
- Conference: 14th Eastern
- 2008–09 record: 24–40–18
- Home record: 12–18–11
- Road record: 12–22–7
- Goals for: 210
- Goals against: 279

Team information
- General manager: Brian Lawton
- Coach: Barry Melrose (Oct.–Nov.); Rick Tocchet (Nov.–Apr.) interim
- Captain: Vincent Lecavalier
- Alternate captains: Andrej Meszaros (Oct.–Nov.); Jeff Halpern (Nov.–Apr.); Martin St. Louis
- Arena: St. Pete Times Forum
- Average attendance: 16,054 (82.3% total)

Team leaders
- Goals: Martin St. Louis (30)
- Assists: Martin St. Louis (50)
- Points: Martin St. Louis (80)
- Penalty minutes: Evgeny Artyukhin (151)
- Plus/minus: Richard Petiot (+5)
- Wins: Mike Smith (14)
- Goals against average: Mike Smith (2.62)

The 2008–09 Tampa Bay Lightning season was the 17th season for the franchise in Tampa Bay. After a season of turnover in ownership, management and players, the team had a turbulent regular season. The Lightning failed to qualify for the Stanley Cup playoffs for the second year in a row for the first time since the 2000–01 season and the 2001–02 season.

== Off-season ==
On June 3, it was announced that head coach John Tortorella would not return to the team despite having one year remaining on his contract.

On June 18, 2008, the NHL Board of Governors approved the sale of the Tampa Bay Lightning. The sale of the Lightning was made to movie and television producer Oren Koules. The deal depended the closing of the financial deal of US$200 million to buy the team and lease the St. Pete Times Forum. Koules, 47, played in Medicine Hat and Calgary in the Western Hockey League (WHL) in the early 1980s. In more recent years, he achieved success with the Saw movie franchise and the television sitcom Two and a Half Men. Among his business partners in the Lightning deal is former NHL player Len Barrie.

On June 24, the Lightning announced that Barry Melrose was hired as the team's new head coach. Melrose had not coached in the NHL since 1995 with the Los Angeles Kings. Since that time, he had served as an analyst for the ESPN networks.

Goaltender Marc Denis' contract was bought-out by the Lightning on June 25, almost two years to the date after his acquisition from the Columbus Blue Jackets. Denis had one year remaining on his contract.

The Lightning acquired the rights to left wingers Ryan Malone and Gary Roberts from the Pittsburgh Penguins in exchange for a conditional draft pick in 2009. Malone then agreed to a seven-year contract with the Lightning two days before he was scheduled to become an unrestricted free agent.

The Lightning acquired the rights to right wing Brian Rolston from the Minnesota Wild in exchange for a conditional draft pick in 2009 or 2010. Rolston would later sign with the New Jersey Devils.

The whirlwind 32 days of questionable moves by new ownership came to a head on July 4 when, despite coming off a recent contract extension, Dan Boyle was traded along with Brad Lukowich to the San Jose Sharks in exchange for Matt Carle (who would be traded in early November), Ty Wishart, a first-round draft pick in 2009 (which was traded in August) and a fourth round draft pick in 2010. Boyle was pressured to waive his no-trade clause by Tampa Bay's ownership, who said they would otherwise place him on waivers where he would likely be claimed by the Atlanta Thrashers. Frustrated at interference in the team's hockey operations by owners Len Barrie and Oren Koules, seven days later, general manager Jay Feaster resigned, despite having three years remaining on his contract. Indeed, Brian Lawton had already taken over the position, though not officially until October 2. John Tortorella would later go on to label the new owners as "cowboys" for these and other dubious moves, a moniker that would stick with them.

On August 29, the Lightning acquired defenceman Andrej Meszaros from the Ottawa Senators in exchange for defenceman Filip Kuba, as well as Alexandre Picard, and a first-round pick in the 2009 NHL Entry Draft (obtained in the Dan Boyle deal with the San Jose Sharks). The Lightning would go on to sign Meszaros to a six-year contract worth $24 million.

On September 18, the Lightning announced that their new team captain would be Vincent Lecavalier.

== Preseason ==
The Tampa Bay Lightning will be playing five pre-season games before opening the season against the New York Rangers on October 4 in Prague. Of special note, this is the first time that Tampa Bay will be opening the season outside of North America. This will also be the first time that the Lightning will play a pre-season game outside North America, playing Eisbären Berlin in Germany on September 28. It was announced later that the Lightning would also play against Slovan Bratislava of the Slovak Extraliga on September 30.

Date	Opponent	Location	Time	Result
Saturday, September 20	Pittsburgh	Mellon Arena	7:30pm	5-4 W (SO)
Monday, September 22	Pittsburgh	St. Pete Times Forum	7:30pm	3-2 L
Tuesday, September 23	NY Rangers	St. Pete Times Forum	7:30 pm	3-2 W
Thursday, September 25	NY Rangers	Madison Square Garden	7:00 pm	4-2 W
Sunday, September 28	Eisbären Berlin	Berlin, Germany	10:00 pm	4-1 W
Tuesday, September 30	Slovan Bratislava	Bratislava, Slovakia	12:00 pm	3-2 W (SO)

- Note: all times EST and bold games are home games.

== Regular season ==
The Lightning struggled on the penalty kill, finishing the regular season with the most power-play opportunities against (405) and the most power-play goals allowed (89).

=== Divisional standings ===
Southeast Division
		GP	W	L	OTL	GF	GA	Pts
**1**	**y – Washington Capitals**	**82**	**50**	**24**	**8**	**272**	**245**	**108**
**2**	**Carolina Hurricanes**	**82**	**45**	**30**	**7**	**239**	**226**	**97**
3	Florida Panthers	82	41	30	11	234	231	93
4	Atlanta Thrashers	82	35	41	6	257	280	76
5	Tampa Bay Lightning	82	24	40	18	210	279	66

=== Conference standings ===
Eastern Conference
R		Div	GP	W	L	OTL	GF	GA	Pts
**1**	**z – Boston Bruins**	**NE**	**82**	**53**	**19**	**10**	**274**	**196**	116
**2**	**y – Washington Capitals**	**SE**	**82**	**50**	**24**	**8**	**272**	**245**	108
**3**	**y – New Jersey Devils**	**AT**	**82**	**51**	**27**	**4**	**244**	**209**	106
**4**	**Pittsburgh Penguins**	**AT**	**82**	**45**	**28**	**9**	**264**	**239**	99
**5**	**Philadelphia Flyers**	**AT**	**82**	**44**	**27**	**11**	**264**	**238**	99
**6**	**Carolina Hurricanes**	**SE**	**82**	**45**	**30**	**7**	**239**	**226**	97
**7**	**New York Rangers**	**AT**	**82**	**43**	**30**	**9**	**210**	**218**	95
**8**	**Montreal Canadiens**	**NE**	**82**	**41**	**30**	**11**	**249**	**247**	93
8.5
9	Florida Panthers	SE	82	41	30	11	234	231	93
10	Buffalo Sabres	NE	82	41	32	9	250	234	91
11	Ottawa Senators	NE	82	36	35	11	217	237	83
12	Toronto Maple Leafs	NE	82	34	35	13	250	293	81
13	Atlanta Thrashers	SE	82	35	41	6	257	280	76
14	Tampa Bay Lightning	SE	82	24	40	18	210	279	66
15	New York Islanders	AT	82	26	47	9	201	279	61

bold – qualified for playoffs, y – division winner, z – placed first in conference (and division)

AT – Atlantic Division, NE – Northeast Division, SE – Southeast Division

=== Game log ===
2008–09 Game Log
October: 3-3-3 (Home 1-2-3, Road 2-1-0)

Game	Date	Opponent	Score	Location	Attendance	Record	Points
1	October 4	New York Rangers	1 – 2	Prague†	17,085	0-1-0	0
2	October 5	New York Rangers	1 – 2	Prague‡	17,085	0-2-0	0
3	October 11	Carolina Hurricanes	3 – 4 OT	St. Pete Times Forum	18,552	0-2-1	1
4	October 16	New York Islanders	3 – 4 OT	St. Pete Times Forum	14,420	0-2-2	2
5	October 18	Minnesota Wild	0 – 1 SO	St. Pete Times Forum	15,191	0-2-3	3
6	October 21	Atlanta Thrashers	3 – 2 OT	St. Pete Times Forum	13,922	1-2-3	5
7	October 25	San Jose Sharks	0 – 3	St. Pete Times Forum	16,831	1-3-3	5
8	October 28	Toronto Maple Leafs	3 – 2	Air Canada Centre	19,348	2-3-3	7
9	October 30	Buffalo Sabres	5 – 2	HSBC Arena	18,690	3-3-3	9
† Tampa Bay was the designated 'home' team on October 4. ‡ New York Rangers were the designated 'home' team on October 5.

November: 3-7-4 (Home 2-2-2, Road 1-5-2)

Game	Date	Opponent	Score	Location	Attendance	Record	Points
10	November 1	Ottawa Senators	3 – 2	St. Pete Times Forum	16,104	4-3-3	11
11	November 5	New Jersey Devils	3 – 4 SO	Prudential Center	11,619	4-3-4	12
12	November 6	New York Rangers	2 – 5	Madison Square Garden	18,200	4-4-4	12
13	November 8	Philadelphia Flyers	2 – 1	Wachovia Center	19,412	5-4-4	14
14	November 10	Washington Capitals	2 – 4	Verizon Center	17,932	5-5-4	14
15	November 12	Florida Panthers	0 – 4	BankAtlantic Center	12,104	5-6-4	14
16	November 13	Detroit Red Wings	3 – 4	St. Pete Times Forum	20,544	5-7-4	14
17	November 16	Carolina Hurricanes	2 – 3 SO	RBC Center	13,781	5-7-5	15
18	November 18	Florida Panthers	3 – 4 SO	St. Pete Times Forum	16,176	5-7-6	16
19	November 21	Nashville Predators	4 – 1	St. Pete Times Forum	16,444	6-7-6	18
20	November 23	New Jersey Devils	3 – 7	St. Pete Times Forum	14,222	6-8-6	18
21	November 26	New York Rangers	2 – 3 SO	St. Pete Times Forum	16,991	6-8-7	19
22	November 28	Minnesota Wild	2 – 4	Xcel Energy Center	18,568	6-9-7	19
23	November 29	Colorado Avalanche	3 – 4	Pepsi Center	18,007	6-10-7	19

December: 4-6-3 (Home 1-2-2, Road 3-4-1)

Game	Date	Opponent	Score	Location	Attendance	Record	Points
24	December 2	Philadelphia Flyers	3 – 4 OT	Wachovia Center	19,227	6-10-8	20
25	December 4	Boston Bruins	1 – 3	St. Pete Times Forum	15,598	6-11-8	20
26	December 6	Buffalo Sabres	3 – 4	St. Pete Times Forum	17,154	6-12-8	20
27	December 8	Boston Bruins	3 – 5	TD Banknorth Garden	16,973	6-13-8	20
28	December 10	Buffalo Sabres	2 – 4	HSBC Arena	18,431	6-14-8	20
29	December 11	Montreal Canadiens	3 – 1	Bell Centre	21,273	7-14-8	22
30	December 13	Ottawa Senators	0 – 2	Scotiabank Place	18,446	7-15-8	22
31	December 18	Colorado Avalanche	1 – 2 SO	St. Pete Times Forum	16,333	7-15-9	23
32	December 20	Atlanta Thrashers	3 – 4	Philips Arena	14,395	7-16-9	23
33	December 23	Pittsburgh Penguins	2 – 0	Mellon Arena	17,064	8-16-9	25
34	December 26	Florida Panthers	4 – 3 SO	BankAtlantic Center	16,961	9-16-9	27
35	December 27	Florida Panthers	6 – 4	St. Pete Times Forum	18,226	10-16-9	29
36	December 30	Montreal Canadiens	1 – 2 SO	St. Pete Times Forum	20,454	10-16-10	30

January: 7-7-0 (Home 4-3-0, Road 3-4-0)

Game	Date	Opponent	Score	Location	Attendance	Record	Points
37	January 1	Washington Capitals	4 – 7	Verizon Center	18,227	10-17-10	30
38	January 3	Carolina Hurricanes	2 – 3	St. Pete Times Forum	15,873	10-18-10	30
39	January 4	Atlanta Thrashers	4 – 1	Philips Arena	10,750	11-18-10	32
40	January 8	Phoenix Coyotes	1 – 4	Jobing.com Arena	13,736	11-19-10	32
41	January 9	Anaheim Ducks	4 – 3	Honda Center	17,174	12-19-10	34
42	January 12	Los Angeles Kings	3 – 1	Staples Center	16,511	13-19-10	36
43	January 13	San Jose Sharks	1 – 7	HP Pavilion at San Jose	17,496	13-20-10	36
44	January 15	Philadelphia Flyers	4 – 1	St. Pete Times Forum	15,604	14-20-10	38
45	January 17	Florida Panthers	3 – 4	St. Pete Times Forum	17,217	14-21-10	38
46	January 19	Dallas Stars	4 – 2	St. Pete Times Forum	13,991	15-21-10	40
47	January 21	Buffalo Sabres	5 – 3	St. Pete Times Forum	15,611	16-21-10	42
48	January 27	Montreal Canadiens	5 – 3	St. Pete Times Forum	15,912	17-21-10	44
49	January 29	Carolina Hurricanes	2 – 3	RBC Center	16,405	17-22-10	44
50	January 30	Philadelphia Flyers	1 – 6	St. Pete Times Forum	18,120	17-23-10	44

February: 3-7-2 (Home 3-3-1, Road 0-4-1)

Game	Date	Opponent	Score	Location	Attendance	Record	Points
51	February 3	New York Islanders	1 – 3	Nassau Veterans Memorial Coliseum	9,808	17-24-10	44
52	February 4	Pittsburgh Penguins	3 – 4 OT	Mellon Arena	16,977	17-24-11	45
53	February 7	New York Islanders	1 – 0	St. Pete Times Forum	14,810	18-24-11	47
54	February 10	Atlanta Thrashers	1 – 3	St. Pete Times Forum	13,490	18-25-11	47
55	February 12	Toronto Maple Leafs	6 – 4	St. Pete Times Forum	16,526	19-25-11	49
56	February 14	Washington Capitals	1 – 5	St. Pete Times Forum	17,249	19-26-11	49
57	February 17	Chicago Blackhawks	3 – 5	St. Pete Times Forum	15,431	19-27-11	49
58	February 19	New Jersey Devils	2 – 3 SO	St. Pete Times Forum	14,408	19-27-12	50
59	February 20	Carolina Hurricanes	1 – 4	RBC Center	17,711	19-28-12	50
60	February 22	Boston Bruins	4 – 3	St. Pete Times Forum	18,454	20-28-12	52
61	February 24	Edmonton Oilers	3 – 5	Rexall Place	16,839	20-29-12	52
62	February 27	Vancouver Canucks	1 – 2	General Motors Place	18,630	20-30-12	52

March: 4-6-5 (Home 1-4-3, Road 3-2-2)

Game	Date	Opponent	Score	Location	Attendance	Record	Points
63	March 1	Calgary Flames	8 – 6	Pengrowth Saddledome	19,289	21-30-12	54
64	March 3	Pittsburgh Penguins	1 – 3	St. Pete Times Forum	19,908	21-31-12	54
65	March 6	St. Louis Blues	3 – 4 OT	St. Pete Times Forum	13,831	21-31-13	55
66	March 7	Carolina Hurricanes	3 – 9	St. Pete Times Forum	15,692	21-32-13	55
67	March 11	Ottawa Senators	2 – 3 OT	Scotiabank Place	19,231	21-32-14	56
68	March 12	Toronto Maple Leafs	4 – 1	Air Canada Centre	19,209	22-32-14	58
69	March 14	Florida Panthers	4 – 3 SO	BankAtlantic Center	17,734	23-32-14	60
70	March 17	Toronto Maple Leafs	3 – 4 SO	St. Pete Times Forum	18,793	23-32-15	61
71	March 19	Washington Capitals	2 – 5	St. Pete Times Forum	16,541	23-33-15	61
72	March 21	Atlanta Thrashers	3 – 4 SO	St. Pete Times Forum	15,391	23-33-16	62
73	March 24	Columbus Blue Jackets	2 – 1 OT	St. Pete Times Forum	14,454	24-33-16	64
74	March 26	Montreal Canadiens	2 – 3 OT	Bell Centre	21,273	24-33-17	65
75	March 27	Washington Capitals	3 – 5	Verizon Center	18,277	24-34-17	65
76	March 29	Ottawa Senators	0 – 3	St. Pete Times Forum	16,427	24-35-17	65
77	March 31	Boston Bruins	1 – 3	TD Banknorth Garden	16,996	24-36-17	65

April: 0-4-1 (Home 0-2-0, Road 0-2-1)

Game	Date	Opponent	Score	Location	Attendance	Record	Points
78	April 3	New Jersey Devils	4 – 5 OT	Prudential Center	17,625	24-36-18	66
79	April 4	New York Islanders	1 – 3	Nassau Veterans Memorial Coliseum	12,809	24-37-18	66
80	April 7	Pittsburgh Penguins	4 – 6	St. Pete Times Forum	19,538	24-38-18	66
81	April 9	Washington Capitals	2 – 4	St. Pete Times Forum	18,891	24-39-18	66
82	April 11	Atlanta Thrashers	2 – 6	Philips Arena	17,122	24-40-18	66

Schedule

=== Record vs. Opponents ===
Team	Points	Record
New Jersey*	106	0–1–3
NY Islanders	61	1–2–1
NY Rangers	95	0–3–1
Philadelphia	99	1–2–1
Pittsburgh	99	1–2–1
Boston*	116	1–3–0
Buffalo	91	2–2–0
Montreal	93	2–0–2
Ottawa	83	1–2–1
Toronto	81	3–0–1
**Atlanta**	76	2–3–1
**Florida**	93	3–2–1
**Carolina**	97	0–4–2
**Washington***	108	0–6–0
Chicago	104	0–0–1
Columbus	92	1–0–0
Detroit*	112	0–1–0
Nashville	88	0–1–0
St. Louis	92	0–0–1
Calgary	98	1–0–0
Colorado	69	0–1–1
Edmonton	85	0–1–0
Minnesota	89	0–1–1
Vancouver*	100	0–1–0
Anaheim	91	1–0–0
Dallas	83	1–0–0
Los Angeles	79	1–0–0
Phoenix	79	1–0–0
San Jose*	117	0–2–0

Notes: * denotes division winner; teams in bold are in the Southeast Division; teams in italics qualified for the playoffs; points refer to the points achieved by the team whom the Thrashers played against

= Member of the Atlantic Division
= Member of the Northeast Division
= Member of the Southeast Division
= Member of the Central Division
= Member of the Northeast Division
= Member of the Pacific Division

== Playoffs ==
The Tampa Bay Lightning failed to qualify for the 2009 NHL playoffs.

== Player stats ==
=== Skaters ===
Note: Pos = Position; GP = Games played; G = Goals; A = Assists; Pts = Points; PIM = Penalty minutes; +/- = Plus/minus; PPG = Power-play goals; SHG = Short-handed goals; GWG = Game-winning goals

Regular season

Player	GP	G	A	Pts	+/−	PIM
Martin St. Louis	82	30	50	80	+4	14
Vincent Lecavalier	77	29	38	67	-9	54
Steven Stamkos	79	23	23	46	-13	39
Vaclav Prospal	82	19	26	45	-20	52
Mark Recchi^{‡}	62	13	32	45	-15	20
Ryan Malone	70	26	19	45	+4	98
Steve Eminger^{†‡}	50	4	19	23	-4	36
Lukas Krajicek	71	2	17	19	-8	48
Jeff Halpern	52	7	9	16	-13	32
Evgeny Artyukhin	73	6	10	16	+1	151
Andrej Meszaros	52	2	14	16	-4	36
Jussi Jokinen^{‡}	46	6	10	16	-8	16
Matt Pettinger	59	8	7	15	-14	24
Cory Murphy^{†}	25	5	10	15	-3	12
Paul Ranger	42	2	11	13	-5	56
Adam Hall	74	5	5	10	-9	29
Paul Szczechura	31	4	5	9	-1	12
Gary Roberts	30	4	3	7	-11	27
Matt Lashoff^{†}	12	0	7	7	-7	10
Radim Vrbata	18	3	3	6	-1	8
Ryan Craig	54	2	4	6	-7	60
Steve Downie^{†}	23	3	3	6	+2	54
Marek Malik	42	0	5	5	-3	36
Josef Melichar^{†}	24	0	5	5	+1	29
Martins Karsums^{†}	18	1	4	5	-5	6
Matt Smaby	43	0	4	4	-11	50
Richard Petiot	11	0	3	3	+5	21
Vladimir Mihalik	11	0	3	3	-3	6
Janne Niskala	6	1	2	3	0	6
Chris Gratton^{‡}	18	0	2	2	-3	10
Jamie Heward^{‡}	13	0	2	2	-1	4
David Koci^{†}	33	1	1	2	+3	132
Matt Carle^{‡}	12	1	1	2	+1	6
Mike Lundin	25	0	2	2	-4	4
Brandon Bochenski	7	0	1	1	-3	2
Zenon Konopka	7	0	1	1	-1	29
Radek Smolenak	6	0	1	1	+1	10
Ty Wishart	5	0	1	1	0	0
Kevin Quick	6	0	1	1	0	0
Jason Ward	1	0	0	0	0	2
Andrew Hutchinson^{‡}	2	0	0	0	-5	0
Brandon Segal	2	0	0	0	0	0
Shane O'Brien^{‡}	1	0	0	0	-1	0
Noah Welch^{†}	17	0	0	0	-4	14
Geoff Kinrade	1	0	0	0	-1	0

=== Goaltenders ===
Note: Pos = Position;GP = Games played; Min, TOI = Minutes played; W = Wins; L = Losses; T,T/OT = Ties; OTL = Overtime losses; GA = Goals-against; GAA = Goals-against average; SO = Shutouts; SA = Shots against; SV = Shots saved; SV% = Save percentage;

Regular season

Player	GP	Min	W	L	OT	GA	GAA	SA	SV	Sv%	SO
Mike Smith	41	2471	14	18	9	108	2.62	1282	1174	.916	2
Karri Ramo	24	1311	4	10	7	80	3.66	756	676	.894	0
Mike McKenna	15	775	4	8	1	46	3.56	406	360	.887	1
Olaf Kolzig^{‡}	8	410	2	4	1	25	3.66	245	220	.898	0
Riku Helenius	1	6	0	0	0	0	0.00	2	2	1.000	0

^{†}Denotes player spent time with another team before joining Lightning. Stats reflect season totals.
^{‡}Traded mid-season
Bold/italics denotes franchise record

== Awards and records ==
=== Milestones ===
Regular Season
Player	Milestone	Reached
Steven Stamkos	1st NHL Game	October 4, 2008
Steven Stamkos	1st NHL Assist; 1st NHL Point	October 28, 2008
Steven Stamkos	1st NHL Goal	October 30, 2008
Steven Stamkos	1st NHL Hat Trick	February 17, 2009

== Transactions ==
=== Trades ===
July 4, 2008	To Tampa Bay; Matt Carle; Ty Wishart; 1st-round pick in 2009 – Kyle Palmieri; 4th-round pick in 2010 – James Mullin	To San Jose; Dan Boyle; Brad Lukowich
August 29, 2008	To Tampa Bay; Andrej Meszaros	To Ottawa Senators; Filip Kuba; Alexandre Picard; 1st-round pick in 2009 – Kyle Palmieri
September 29, 2008	To Tampa Bay; Conditional 6th-round pick in 2009 – Jaroslav Janus	To Nashville Predators; Nick Tarnasky
October 6, 2008	To Tampa Bay; Lukas Krajicek; Juraj Simek	To Vancouver Canucks; Shane O'Brien; Michel Ouellet
November 7, 2008	To Tampa Bay; Steve Eminger; Steve Downie; 4th-round pick in 2009 – Alex Hutchings	To Philadelphia Flyers; Matt Carle; 3rd-round pick in 2009 – Simon Bertilsson
November 25, 2008	To Tampa Bay; Future Considerations	To Phoenix Coyotes; Wyatt Smith
November 30, 2008	To Tampa Bay; Lauri Tukonen	To Dallas Stars; Andrew Hutchinson
February 7, 2009	To Tampa Bay; Wade Brookbank; Josef Melichar; 4th-round pick in 2009 (pick ultimately forfeited)	To Carolina Hurricanes; Jussi Jokinen
March 4, 2009	To Tampa Bay; Matt Lashoff; Martins Karsums	To Boston Bruins; Mark Recchi; 2nd-round pick in 2010 – Alex Petrovic

=== Free agents ===
Player	Former team	Contract Terms
Adam Hall	Pittsburgh Penguins	3 years, $1.8 million
Olaf Kolzig	Washington Capitals	1 year, $1.5 million
Radim Vrbata	Phoenix Coyotes	3 years, $9 million
Mark Recchi	Atlanta Thrashers	1 year, $1.25 million
David Koci	Chicago Blackhawks	1 year, $525,000
Brandon Bochenski	Nashville Predators	2 years
Marek Malik	New York Rangers	1 year, $1.25 million

Player	New team
Marc Denis	Montreal Canadiens
Junior Lessard	Atlanta Thrashers
Craig MacDonald	Columbus Blue Jackets
Doug Janik	Chicago Blackhawks

=== Claimed from waivers ===
Player	Former team	Date claimed off waivers
Matt Pettinger	Vancouver Canucks	October 21, 2008
Cory Murphy	Florida Panthers	January 19, 2009

== Draft picks ==
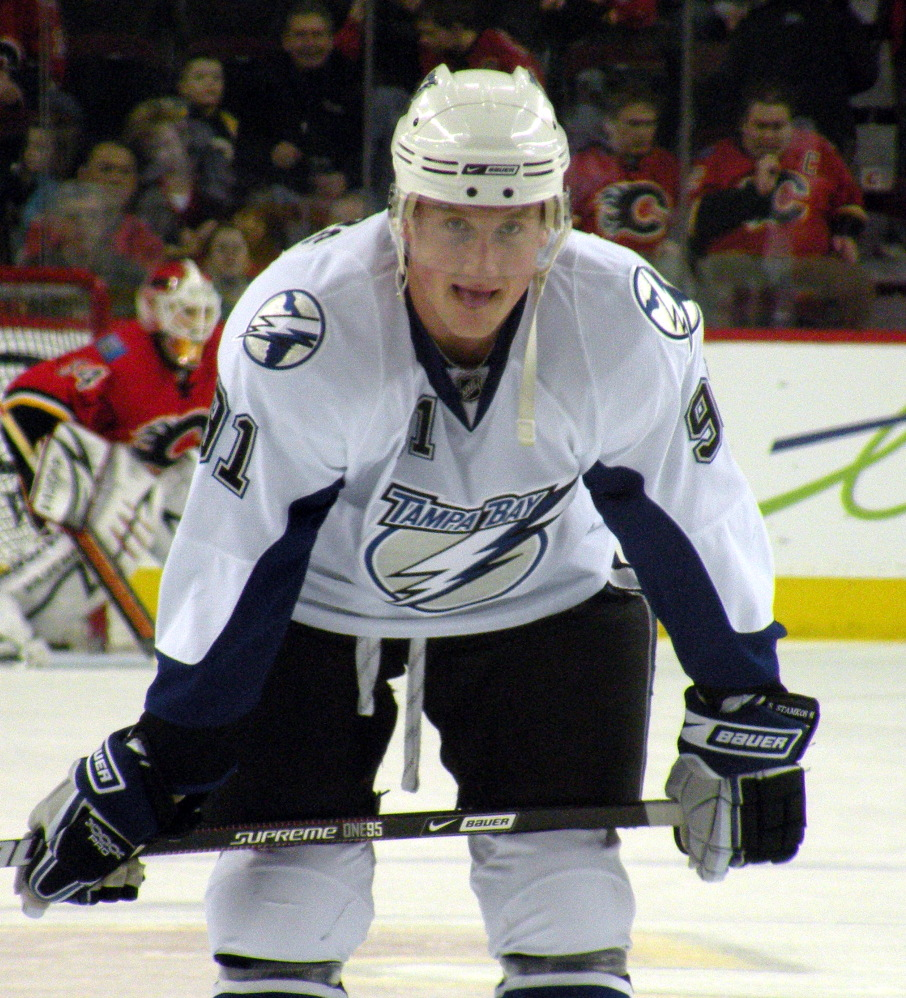
Steven Stamkos was the first overall selection in 2008

Tampa Bay entered the NHL Draft Lottery with a 48.8% chance of winning the lottery after stumbling to a 31–42–9 record in the regular season. The Lightning finished last in the league just four years after winning their first Stanley Cup.

Tampa Bay's picks at the 2008 NHL entry draft in Ottawa, Ontario.

Round	Pick	Player	Position	Nationality	Club Team
1	1	Steven Stamkos	(C)	Canada	Sarnia Sting (OHL)
4	117 (from San Jose)	James Wright	(C)	Canada	Vancouver Giants (WHL)
5	122	Dustin Tokarski	(G)	Canada	Spokane Chiefs (WHL)
5	147 (from San Jose)	Kyle De Coste	(RW)	Canada	Brampton Battalion (OHL)
6	152	Mark Barberio	(D)	Canada	Moncton Wildcats (QMJHL)
6	160 (from Florida via Chicago)	Luke Witkowski	(D)	United States	Ohio Junior Blue Jackets (USHL)
7	182	Matias Sointu	(RW)	Finland	Ilves (Finland Jr.)
7	203 (from Anaheim)	David Carle	(D)	United States	Shattuck-Saint Mary's (USHS-MN)

== See also ==
- 2008–09 NHL season
