= 2008–09 New York Rangers season =

NHL hockey team season

2008–09 New York Rangers
- Division: 4th Atlantic
- Conference: 7th Eastern
- 2008–09 record: 43–30–9
- Home record: 26–11–4
- Road record: 17–19–5
- Goals for: 210
- Goals against: 218

Team information
- General manager: Glen Sather
- Coach: Tom Renney (Oct.–Feb.); John Tortorella (Feb.–Apr.)
- Captain: Chris Drury
- Alternate captains: Scott Gomez; Markus Naslund
- Arena: Madison Square Garden
- Average attendance: 18,200

Team leaders
- Goals: Markus Naslund (24)
- Assists: Scott Gomez (42)
- Points: Scott Gomez; Nikolay Zherdev (58)
- Penalty minutes: Colton Orr (193)
- Plus/minus: Ryan Callahan (+7)
- Wins: Henrik Lundqvist (38)
- Goals against average: Lundqvist (2.40)

The 2008–09 New York Rangers season was the franchise's 82nd season of play and their 83rd season overall. It saw the Rangers qualify for the playoffs for the fourth consecutive season. The Rangers started the season in Europe; first, as part of the inaugural Victoria Cup being held in Switzerland, the Rangers played an exhibition game against SC Bern on September 30, and then the main game against the 2008 European Champions Metallurg Magnitogorsk on October 1 (the first game between a Russian club and an NHL team since 1991). They won both games, and were awarded the first Victoria Cup. The Rangers battled from a 3–0 deficit in the Victoria Cup to win the game by a score of 4–3. Ryan Callahan scored the game-winning goal with 20 seconds left.

On October 3, 2008, Chris Drury was named the 25th captain in Rangers history. The Rangers opened the NHL regular season against the Tampa Bay Lightning with two games in Prague, Czech Republic, on October 4 and 5. Alexei Cherepanov, a former first-round draft pick of the Rangers, died suddenly on October 13 during a Kontinental Hockey League (KHL) game in Moscow. The Rangers tied the 1983–84 Rangers for the best start in franchise history with a 5–0 record. The quest for the greatest start in franchise history was put to a halt on October 15, 2008, with a 3–1 loss to the Buffalo Sabres. The Rangers set the franchise record for best start in a season by going 10–2–1 for 21 points in the first 13 games. The 10 wins and 21 points both marked franchise records. On January 24, 2009, the festivities for the 2009 NHL All-Star Game began in Montreal with Brandon Dubinsky and Marc Staal playing for the Sophomore Team in the YoungStars Game. Staal scored two goals in the game, but the Rookie Team won 9–5. Henrik Lundqvist was the Rangers' only All-Star selection, and stopped 12 of 16 shots in the Elimination Shootout during the SuperSkills Competition. On January 25, 2009, Lundqvist stopped 15 of the 21 shots he faced in the second period of the All-Star Game, helping the East beat the West 12–11 in a shootout. On February 3, 2009, the New York Rangers retired Adam Graves' number 9 jersey before a game against the Atlanta Thrashers, joining fellow 1994 Stanley Cup champion teammates Brian Leetch, Mark Messier and Mike Richter, as well as Ranger greats Rod Gilbert and Eddie Giacomin, in the rafters of Madison Square Garden. On February 22, the Rangers retired Andy Bathgate's number 9 and Harry Howell's number 3 jerseys before a game against the Toronto Maple Leafs. A day later, Head Coach Tom Renney was fired after five seasons with the Rangers. Former Rangers assistant coach and coach of the 2004 Stanley Cup champion Tampa Bay Lightning, John Tortorella, was hired later that same day to replace Renney. Rangers Assistant general manager Jim Schoenfeld was given the interim assistant coaching position. Shortly after that, Sean Avery made his return to the Rangers, claimed off waivers from the Dallas Stars. Head Coach John Tortorella was suspended for Game 6 of the Rangers–Washington Capitals playoff series after an altercation with a fan towards the end of the Rangers' 4–0 loss in Washington, D.C., during Game 5. On May 4, 2009, Markus Naslund announced that he would be retiring after one season with the Rangers.

== Pre-season ==
2008 pre-season game log: 3–5–0 (home: 2–2–0; road: 1–3–0)

#	Date	Opponent	Score	Decision	Record
1	September 20	@ Ottawa Senators	3 – 2	Valiquette	0–1–0
2	September 22	Ottawa Senators	2 – 1	Lundqvist	1–1–0
3	September 23	@ Tampa Bay Lightning	3 – 2	Wiikman	1–2–0
4	September 24	@ New Jersey Devils	3 – 2	Lundqvist	1–3–0
5	September 25	Tampa Bay Lightning	4 – 2	Valiquette	1–4–0
6	September 27	New Jersey Devils	4 – 2	Lundqvist	1–5–0
7	September 30 (in Bern, Switzerland)	SC Bern	8 – 1	Valiquette	2–5–0
8	October 1 (in Bern, Switzerland)	Metallurg Magnitogorsk	4 – 3	Lundqvist	3–5–0

== Regular season ==
The Rangers finished the regular season with the League's best penalty-kill percentage, at 87.84%.

=== Divisional standings ===
Atlantic Division
		GP	W	L	OTL	GF	GA	Pts
**1**	**New Jersey Devils**	**82**	**51**	**27**	**4**	**244**	**209**	**106**
**2**	**Pittsburgh Penguins**	**82**	**45**	**28**	**9**	**264**	**239**	**99**
**3**	**Philadelphia Flyers**	**82**	**44**	**27**	**11**	**264**	**238**	**99**
**4**	**New York Rangers**	**82**	**43**	**30**	**9**	**210**	**218**	**95**
5	New York Islanders	82	26	47	9	201	279	61

=== Conference standings ===
Eastern Conference
R		Div	GP	W	L	OTL	GF	GA	Pts
**1**	**z – Boston Bruins**	**NE**	**82**	**53**	**19**	**10**	**274**	**196**	116
**2**	**y – Washington Capitals**	**SE**	**82**	**50**	**24**	**8**	**272**	**245**	108
**3**	**y – New Jersey Devils**	**AT**	**82**	**51**	**27**	**4**	**244**	**209**	106
**4**	**Pittsburgh Penguins**	**AT**	**82**	**45**	**28**	**9**	**264**	**239**	99
**5**	**Philadelphia Flyers**	**AT**	**82**	**44**	**27**	**11**	**264**	**238**	99
**6**	**Carolina Hurricanes**	**SE**	**82**	**45**	**30**	**7**	**239**	**226**	97
**7**	**New York Rangers**	**AT**	**82**	**43**	**30**	**9**	**210**	**218**	95
**8**	**Montreal Canadiens**	**NE**	**82**	**41**	**30**	**11**	**249**	**247**	93
8.5
9	Florida Panthers	SE	82	41	30	11	234	231	93
10	Buffalo Sabres	NE	82	41	32	9	250	234	91
11	Ottawa Senators	NE	82	36	35	11	217	237	83
12	Toronto Maple Leafs	NE	82	34	35	13	250	293	81
13	Atlanta Thrashers	SE	82	35	41	6	257	280	76
14	Tampa Bay Lightning	SE	82	24	40	18	210	279	66
15	New York Islanders	AT	82	26	47	9	201	279	61

bold – qualified for playoffs, y – division winner, z – placed first in conference (and division)

AT – Atlantic Division, NE – Northeast Division, SE – Southeast Division

== Schedule and results ==
Win (2 points) Loss (0 points) Overtime/shootout loss (1 point)

2008-09 Game Log
October: 10-2-1 (Home: 6-2-0; Road: 4-0-1)

Game	October	Opponent	Score	Decision	Record
1	4 (in Prague, Czech Republic)	@ Tampa Bay Lightning	2 – 1	Lundqvist	1–0–0
2	5 (in Prague, Czech Republic)	Tampa Bay Lightning	2 – 1	Lundqvist	2–0–0
3	10	Chicago Blackhawks	4 – 2	Lundqvist	3–0–0
4	11	@ Philadelphia Flyers	4 – 3	Valiquette	4–0–0
5	13	New Jersey Devils	4 – 1	Lundqvist	5–0–0
6	15	Buffalo Sabres	3 – 1	Lundqvist	5–1–0
7	17	Toronto Maple Leafs	1 – 0 SO	Valiquette	6–1–0
8	18	@ Detroit Red Wings	5 – 4 OT	Lundqvist	6–1–1
9	20	Dallas Stars	2 – 1	Lundqvist	6–2–1
10	24	@ Columbus Blue Jackets	3 – 1	Lundqvist	7–2–1
11	25	Pittsburgh Penguins	3 – 2 SO	Lundqvist	8–2–1
12	27	@ New York Islanders	4 – 2	Lundqvist	9–2–1
13	30	Atlanta Thrashers	3 – 2	Lundqvist	10–2–1

November: 7-6-1 (Home: 4-3-1; Road: 3-3-0)

Game	November	Opponent	Score	Decision	Record
14	1	@ Toronto Maple Leafs	5 – 2	Valiquette	10–3–1
15	4	New York Islanders	2 – 1	Lundqvist	10–4–1
16	6	Tampa Bay Lightning	5 – 2	Lundqvist	11–4–1
17	8	@ Washington Capitals	3 – 1	Lundqvist	11–5–1
18	10	Edmonton Oilers	3 – 2 SO	Lundqvist	11–5–2
19	12	@ New Jersey Devils	5 – 2	Lundqvist	12–5–2
20	15	Boston Bruins	3 – 2 SO	Lundqvist	13–5–2
21	17	Ottawa Senators	2 – 1 SO	Lundqvist	14–5–2
22	19	Vancouver Canucks	6 – 3	Lundqvist	14–6–2
23	22	@ Ottawa Senators	4 – 1	Valiquette	14–7–2
24	24	Phoenix Coyotes	4 – 1	Lundqvist	15–7–2
25	26	@ Tampa Bay Lightning	3 – 2 SO	Lundqvist	16–7–2
26	28	@ Florida Panthers	4 – 3 SO	Lundqvist	17–7–2
27	30	Florida Panthers	4 – 0	Lundqvist	17–8–2

December: 6-5-1 (Home: 3-2-1; Road: 3-3-0)

Game	December	Opponent	Score	Decision	Record
28	3	Pittsburgh Penguins	3 – 2 SO	Lundqvist	18–8–2
29	4	@ Montreal Canadiens	6 – 2	Lundqvist	18–9–2
30	7	Calgary Flames	3 – 0	Lundqvist	18–10–2
31	10	@ Atlanta Thrashers	3 – 2 OT	Valiquette	19–10–2
32	12	@ New Jersey Devils	8 – 5	Lundqvist	19–11–2
33	13	Carolina Hurricanes	3 – 2 SO	Lundqvist	20–11–2
34	16	@ Anaheim Ducks	3 – 1	Lundqvist	21–11–2
35	17	@ Los Angeles Kings	3 – 2 OT	Valiquette	22–11–2
36	20	@ San Jose Sharks	3 – 2	Lundqvist	22–12–2
37	23	Washington Capitals	5 – 4 OT	Lundqvist	22–12–3
38	27	New Jersey Devils	4 – 2	Lundqvist	22–13–3
39	29	New York Islanders	5 – 4	Lundqvist	23–13–3

January: 6-5-1 (Home: 3-1-0; Road: 3-4-1)

Game	January	Opponent	Score	Decision	Record
40	3	@ Washington Capitals	2 – 1	Valiquette	23–14–3
41	5	Pittsburgh Penguins	4 – 0	Lundqvist	24–14–3
42	7	Montreal Canadiens	6 – 3	Lundqvist	24–15–3
43	9	@ Buffalo Sabres	2 – 1 SO	Valiquette	24–15–4
44	10	@ Ottawa Senators	2 – 0	Lundqvist	25–15–4
45	13	@ New York Islanders	2 – 1	Lundqvist	26–15–4
46	16	@ Chicago Blackhawks	3 – 2 OT	Lundqvist	27–15–4
47	18	@ Pittsburgh Penguins	3 – 0	Lundqvist	27–16–4
48	20	Anaheim Ducks	4 – 2	Lundqvist	28–16–4
49	27	Carolina Hurricanes	3 – 2	Valiquette	29–16–4
50	28	@ Pittsburgh Penguins	6 – 2	Lundqvist	29–17–4
51	31	@ Boston Bruins	1 – 0	Lundqvist	29–18–4

February: 3-6-4 (Home: 3-2-2; Road: 0-4-2)

Game	February	Opponent	Score	Decision	Record
52	3	Atlanta Thrashers	2 – 1 SO	Lundqvist	29–18–5
53	6	@ Dallas Stars	10 – 2	Valiquette	29–19–5
54	9	@ New Jersey Devils	3 – 0	Lundqvist	29–20–5
55	11	Washington Capitals	5 – 4 SO	Lundqvist	30–20–5
56	13	@ Florida Panthers	2 – 1 SO	Lundqvist	30–20–6
57	15	Philadelphia Flyers	5 – 2	Lundqvist	30–21–6
58	16	@ St. Louis Blues	2 – 1	Lundqvist	30–22–6
59	18	New York Islanders	3 – 1	Lundqvist	31–22–6
60	21	@ Buffalo Sabres	4 – 2	Lundqvist	31–23–6
61	22	Toronto Maple Leafs	3 – 2 OT	Lundqvist	31–23–7
62	25	@ Toronto Maple Leafs	2 – 1 SO	Lundqvist	31–23–8
63	26	Florida Panthers	2 – 1	Lundqvist	31–24–8
64	28	Colorado Avalanche	6 – 1	Lundqvist	32–24–8

March: 8-4-1 (Home: 5-1-0; Road: 3-3-1)

Game	March	Opponent	Score	Decision	Record
65	5	@ New York Islanders	4 – 2	Lundqvist	33–24–8
66	8	Boston Bruins	4 – 3	Lundqvist	34–24–8
67	9	@ Carolina Hurricanes	3 – 0	Valiquette	34–25–8
68	12	@ Nashville Predators	4 – 2	Lundqvist	35–25–8
69	14	@ Philadelphia Flyers	4 – 2	Lundqvist	35–26–8
70	15	Philadelphia Flyers	4 – 1	Lundqvist	36–26–8
71	17	@ Montreal Canadiens	4 – 3 SO	Lundqvist	37–26–8
72	21	Buffalo Sabres	5 – 3	Lundqvist	38–26–8
73	22	Ottawa Senators	2 – 1	Lundqvist	38–27–8
74	24	Minnesota Wild	2 – 1	Lundqvist	39–27–8
75	26	@ Atlanta Thrashers	5 – 4 SO	Valiquette	39–27–9
76	28	@ Pittsburgh Penguins	4 – 3	Lundqvist	39–28–9
77	30	New Jersey Devils	3 – 0	Lundqvist	40–28–9

April: 3-2-0 (Home: 2-0-0; Road: 1-2-0)

Game	April	Opponent	Score	Decision	Record
78	2	@ Carolina Hurricanes	4 – 2	Lundqvist	40–29–9
79	4	@ Boston Bruins	1 – 0	Lundqvist	40–30–9
80	7	Montreal Canadiens	3 – 1	Lundqvist	41–30–9
81	9	Philadelphia Flyers	2 – 1	Lundqvist	42–30–9
82	12	@ Philadelphia Flyers	4 – 3	Lundqvist	43–30–9

== Playoffs ==
The New York Rangers ended the 2008–09 regular season as the Eastern Conference's seventh seed. They were defeated in the first round by the Washington Capitals in seven games.

Key: Win Loss

2009 Stanley Cup Playoffs
Eastern Conference Quarter-finals: vs. (2) Washington Capitals – Washington wins series 4-3

#	Date	Visitor	Score	Home	OT	Decision	Series
1	April 15	New York Rangers	4 – 3	Washington Capitals		Lundqvist	New York Rangers lead series 1-0
2	April 18	New York Rangers	1 – 0	Washington Capitals		Lundqvist	New York Rangers lead series 2-0
3	April 20	Washington Capitals	4 – 0	New York Rangers		Lundqvist	New York Rangers lead series 2-1
4	April 22	Washington Capitals	1 – 2	New York Rangers		Lundqvist	New York Rangers lead series 3-1
5	April 24	New York Rangers	0 – 4	Washington Capitals		Lundqvist	New York Rangers lead series 3-2
6	April 26	Washington Capitals	5 – 3	New York Rangers		Lundqvist	Series tied 3-3
7	April 28	New York Rangers	1 – 2	Washington Capitals		Lundqvist	Washington wins series 4-3

== Player statistics ==
Skaters

Regular season
Player	GP	G	A	Pts	+/-	PIM
Scott Gomez	77	16	42	58	-2	60
Nikolay Zherdev	82	23	35	58	+6	39
Chris Drury	81	22	34	56	-8	32
Markus Naslund	82	24	22	46	-10	57
Brandon Dubinsky	82	13	28	41	-6	112
Ryan Callahan	81	22	18	40	+7	45
Michal Rozsival	76	8	22	30	-7	52
Wade Redden	81	3	23	26	-5	51
Daniel Girardi	82	4	18	22	-14	53
Paul Mara	76	5	16	21	+2	94
Nigel Dawes^{‡}	52	10	9	19	-2	15
Aaron Voros	54	8	8	16	-9	122
Marc Staal	82	3	12	15	-7	64
Lauri Korpikoski	68	6	8	14	-10	14
Nik Antropov^{†}	18	7	6	13	-1	6
Dmitri Kalinin^{‡}	58	1	12	13	-7	26
Fredrik Sjostrom	79	7	6	13	-11	30
Sean Avery^{†}	18	5	7	12	+4	34
Blair Betts	81	6	4	10	-5	16
Petr Prucha^{‡}	28	4	5	9	-2	16
Derek Morris^{†}	18	0	8	8	+3	16
Colton Orr	82	1	4	5	-15	193
Dan Fritsche^{‡}	16	1	3	4	-2	2
Corey Potter	5	1	1	2	-1	0
Erik Reitz^{†‡}	11	0	0	0	-4	24
Patrick Rissmiller	2	0	0	0	-2	0
Mike Sauer	3	0	0	0	-1	0
Artem Anisimov	1	0	0	0	0	0

Playoffs
Player	GP	G	A	Pts	+/-	PIM
Scott Gomez	7	2	3	5	-4	4
Brandon Dubinsky	7	1	3	4	+1	18
Markus Naslund	7	1	2	3	+2	10
Nik Antropov	7	2	1	3	-1	6
Wade Redden	7	0	2	2	-2	0
Derek Morris	7	0	2	2	-2	0
Paul Mara	7	1	1	2	-2	8
Sean Avery	6	0	2	2	-3	24
Lauri Korpikoski	7	0	2	2	0	0
Ryan Callahan	7	2	0	2	-1	4
Chris Drury	6	1	0	1	-5	2
Fredrik Sjostrom	7	0	1	1	0	0
Marc Staal	7	1	0	1	-3	0
Michal Rozsival	7	0	0	0	0	4
Blair Betts	6	0	0	0	-1	0
Colton Orr	5	0	0	0	-1	16
Aaron Voros	4	0	0	0	-2	14
Nikolay Zherdev	7	0	0	0	-3	2
Daniel Girardi	7	0	0	0	-3	6
Artem Anisimov	1	0	0	0	0	0

Goaltenders

Regular season
Player	GP	TOI	W	L	OT	GA	GAA	SA	SV%	SO
Henrik Lundqvist	70	4153	38	25	7	168	2.43	2007	.916	3
Steve Valiquette	15	823	5	5	2	39	2.84	421	.907	1

Playoffs
Player	GP	TOI	W	L	GA	GAA	SA	SV%	SO
Henrik Lundqvist	7	380	3	4	19	3.00	207	.908	1
Steve Valiquette	2	40	0	0	0	0.00	9	1.000	0

^{†}Denotes player spent time with another team before joining Rangers. Stats reflect time with Rangers only.
^{‡}Traded mid-season. Stats reflect time with Rangers only.

Note:

Pos = Position;GP = Games played; G = Goals; A = Assists; Pts = Points; PIM = Penalty minutes; +/- = Plus/minus; PPG = Power-play goals; SHG = Short-handed goals; GWG = Game-winning goals
Pos = Position;GP = Games played; Min, TOI = Minutes played; W = Wins; L = Losses; T,T/OT = Ties; OTL = Overtime losses; GA = Goals-against; GAA = Goals-against average; SO = Shutouts; SA = Shots against; SV = Shots saved;SV% = Save percentage;

== Awards and records ==
=== Milestones ===
Regular Season
Player	Milestone	Reached
Lauri Korpikoski	1st NHL Regular Season Game	October 4, 2008
Henrik Lundqvist	200th NHL Appearance	October 15, 2008
Brandon Dubinsky	100th NHL Game	October 27, 2008
Nikolay Zherdev	300th NHL Game	November 8, 2008
Lauri Korpikoski	1st NHL Regular Season Goal; 1st NHL Regular Season Point	November 12, 2008
Marc Staal	100th NHL Game	November 15, 2008
Lauri Korpikoski	1st NHL Assist	November 15, 2008
Michal Rozsival	500th NHL Game	November 17, 2008
Fredrik Sjostrom	300th NHL Game	November 22, 2008
Nikolai Zherdev	200th NHL Point	November 24, 2008
Scott Gomez	400th NHL Assist	December 3, 2008
Corey Potter	1st NHL Regular Season Game	December 7, 2008
Ryan Callahan	100th NHL Game	December 16, 2008
Dmitri Kalinin	500th NHL Game	December 16, 2008
Paul Mara	600th NHL Game	December 23, 2008
Colton Orr	200th NHL Game	December 23, 2008
Corey Potter	1st NHL Assist; 1st NHL Point	December 27, 2008
Wade Redden	500th NHL Penalty Minute	January 3, 2009
Nigel Dawes	100th NHL Game	January 5, 2009
Blair Betts	300th NHL Game	January 9, 2009
Henrik Lundqvist	1st NHL All-Star Game	January 25, 2009
Artem Anisimov	1st NHL Game	February 3, 2009
Aaron Voros	100th NHL Game	February 3, 2009
Colton Orr	500th NHL Penalty Minute	February 21, 2009
Michal Rozsival	200th NHL Point	February 22, 2009
Wade Redden	900th NHL Game	February 26, 2009
John Tortorella	1st Win as Rangers coach	February 28, 2009
Markus Naslund	1,100th NHL Game	March 5, 2009
Henrik Lundquist	1st NHL goalie to win 30+ games in first four seasons	March 12, 2009
John Tortorella	Winningest US-born coach in NHL history with 245 wins	March 17, 2009
Mike Sauer	1st NHL Game	March 24, 2009
Nik Antropov	300th NHL Point	March 26, 2009
Scott Gomez	700th NHL Game	March 28, 2009
Corey Potter	1st NHL Goal	April 2, 2009
Artem Anisimov	1st NHL Playoff Game	April 28, 2009
Markus Naslund	Final NHL Game	April 28, 2009

== Transactions ==
The Rangers have been involved in the following transactions during the 2008–09 season.

=== Trades ===
Date	Details
July 2, 2008	To Columbus Blue Jackets Fedor Tyutin; Christian Backman	To New York Rangers Nikolay Zherdev; Dan Fritsche
July 14, 2008	To Toronto Maple Leafs Ryan Hollweg	To New York Rangers 5th-round pick in 2009
October 30, 2008	To Nashville Predators Hugh Jessiman	To New York Rangers Future considerations
January 29, 2009	To Minnesota Wild Dan Fritsche	To New York Rangers Erik Reitz
March 4, 2009	To Toronto Maple Leafs 2nd-round pick in 2009; Conditional pick in 2010 (Note: Condition not satisfied.)	To New York Rangers Nik Antropov
March 4, 2009	To Phoenix Coyotes Nigel Dawes; Dmitri Kalinin; Petr Prucha	To New York Rangers Derek Morris

=== Free agents acquired ===
Player	Former team	Contract terms
Aaron Voros	Minnesota Wild	3 years, $3 million
Patrick Rissmiller	San Jose Sharks	1 year, $1 million
Wade Redden	Ottawa Senators	6 years, $39 million
Markus Naslund	Vancouver Canucks	2 years, $8 million
Dmitri Kalinin	Buffalo Sabres	1 year, $2.1 million
Andreas Jamtin	HV71 (Elitserien)	Undisclosed
Vladimir Denisov	Lake Erie Monsters (AHL)	Undisclosed
Brian Fahey	Chicago Wolves (AHL)	Undisclosed

=== Free agents lost ===
Player	New team	Contract terms
Sean Avery	Dallas Stars	4 years, $15.5 million
Jaromir Jagr	Avangard Omsk (KHL)	2 years, $20 million
Martin Straka	HC Lasselsberger Plzeň (Czech Extraliga)	1 year
Jason Strudwick	Edmonton Oilers	1 year, $650,000
Andrew Hutchinson	Tampa Bay Lightning	2 years, $1 million
Marek Malik	Tampa Bay Lightning	1 year, $1.2 million
Brendan Shanahan	New Jersey Devils	1 year, $800,000

=== Claimed from waivers ===
Player	Former team	Date claimed off waivers
Mark Bell	Toronto Maple Leafs	February 25, 2009
Sean Avery	Dallas Stars	March 3, 2009

=== Lost via waivers ===
Player	New team	Date claimed off waivers
Erik Reitz	Toronto Maple Leafs	March 4, 2009

=== Player signings ===
Player	Contract terms
Michal Rozsival	4 years, $20 million
Steve Valiquette	1 year, $725,000
Paul Mara	1 year, $1.95 million
Dan Fritsche	1 year, $875,000
Nigel Dawes	1 year, $587,500
Greg Moore	1 year, $578,000
Fredrik Sjostrom	1 year, $840,000

== Draft picks ==
New York's picks at the 2008 NHL entry draft in Ottawa, Ontario:

Round	#	Player	Position	Nationality	College/Junior/Club team (League)
1	20	Michael Del Zotto	D	Canada	Oshawa Generals (OHL)
2	51	Derek Stepan	C	United States	Shattuck-Saint Mary's (USHS-MN)
3	75	Evgeny Grachev	C	Russia	Lokomotiv-2 Yaroslavl (Russia)
3	90	Tomas Kundratek	D	Czech Republic	Oceláři Třinec (Czech Extraliga)
4	111	Dale Weise	RW	Canada	Swift Current Broncos (WHL)
5	141	Chris Doyle	C	Canada	P.E.I. Rocket (QMJHL)
6	171	Mitch Gaulton	D	Canada	Erie Otters (OHL)

== See also ==
- 2008–09 NHL season

== Farm teams ==
=== Hartford Wolf Pack (AHL) ===
The 2008–09 season will be the 12th season of American Hockey League (AHL) hockey for the franchise.

=== Charlotte Checkers (ECHL) ===
The 2008–09 season will be the 16th season of ECHL hockey for the franchise.
