= Aaron Voros =

Canadian ice hockey player

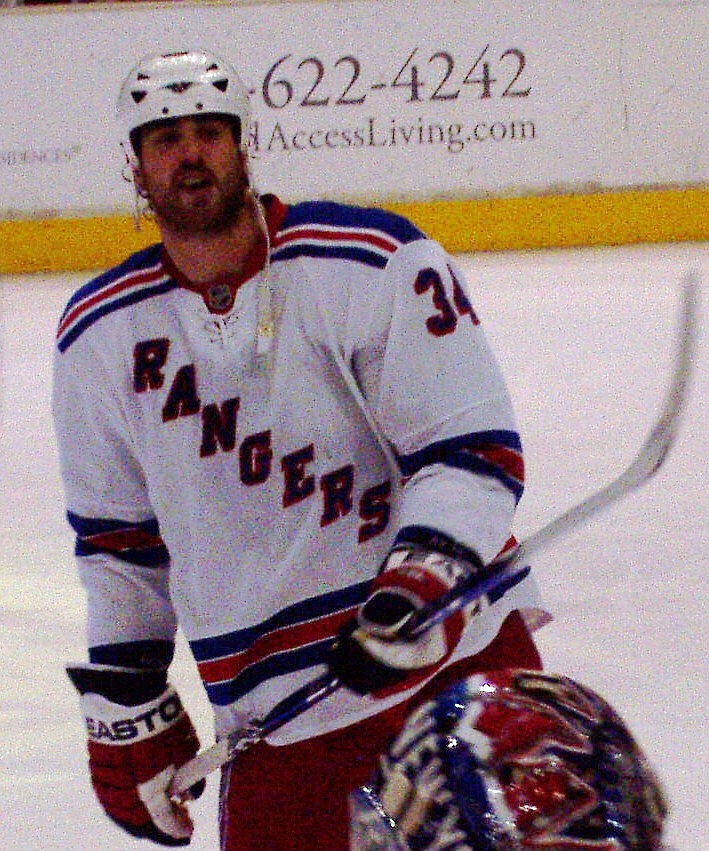
- Voros in 2008 with the New York Rangers
- Born: July 2, 1981 (age 45) Vancouver, British Columbia, Canada
- Height: 6 ft 4 in (193 cm)
- Weight: 220 lb (100 kg; 15 st 10 lb)
- Position: Wing
- Shot: Left
- Played for: New Jersey Devils; Minnesota Wild; New York Rangers; Anaheim Ducks
- NHL draft: 229th overall, 2001; New Jersey Devils
- Playing career: 2003–2012

Aaron Voros (born July 2, 1981) is a Canadian former professional ice hockey player. Voros played in the National Hockey League with the Minnesota Wild, New York Rangers and Anaheim Ducks between 2007 and 2011. He served two consecutive years as the team president of the NHL Players Association for the New York Rangers and one year for the Anaheim Ducks.

== Playing career ==
Voros played amateur hockey in his hometown of Surrey, British Columbia with the Surrey Minor Hockey Association, also playing Nor-Wes Caps-Junior B of the PIJHL and Junior A with the Victoria Salsa of the BCHL. He was an 8th round draft pick by the New Jersey Devils in the 2001 NHL draft while playing for the Victoria Salsa. That summer he also received a full athletic hockey scholarship to the University of Alaska Fairbanks, where he was named to the CCHA All-Rookie team in his freshman year.

On March 1, 2007, the Minnesota Wild traded a seventh-round draft pick in 2008 to the New Jersey Devils for Voros. After starting the 2007–08 season with the Wild's American Hockey League affiliate, the Houston Aeros, Voros was called upon to play his first NHL game on November 11, 2007, against the Colorado Avalanche.

Voros scored his first NHL goal, as a member of the Wild, against Roberto Luongo of the Vancouver Canucks on November 16, 2007, in his birthplace and hometown of Vancouver, British Columbia, Canada. He would go on to score seven goals and seven assists in 55 games during his rookie season. Voros was nominated as the Wild's 2008 Bill Masterton Trophy candidate by the Twin Cities chapter of the Professional Hockey Writers' Association.

On July 1, 2008, Voros was signed as a free agent to a 3-year deal with the New York Rangers.

While in New York, Aaron Voros served as the New York Rangers NHLPA representative from October 2008 until he was traded to Anaheim in July 2010.

On June 10, 2010, he was traded along with Ryan Hillier to the Anaheim Ducks in exchange for defenceman Steve Eminger.

Known for showing up to training camp in top fitness, he took this attitude and delivered a great camp in Anaheim where he played for the Anaheim Ducks of the National Hockey League (NHL) in the 2010-2011 season. 10 games into the season Anaheim put Voros on short term injured reserve. On the day after coming off injured reserve, Voros suffered a broken orbital bone on December 8, 2010, in a game in Vancouver. He was placed on the Anaheim Ducks' injured reserved list until February 11, 2011.

On February 15, 2011, Voros was traded to the Toronto Maple Leafs for a conditional draft pick.

== Personal life ==
Voros is of Hungarian descent, was born at Vancouver's British Columbia Children's Hospital, and was raised in Surrey, British Columbia. His grandfather and grandmother emigrated from Hungary in 1956 and settled in Vancouver after leaving during the Hungarian Revolution. In an interview in 2008, Voros said that he is proud of his Hungarian roots and would love to represent Hungary on the international level if it were permissible.

In May 2011, Voros and his teammate Henrik Lundqvist opened their first restaurant in Manhattan called "Tiny's & the Bar Upstairs". The restaurant is located at 135 West Broadway in the Tribeca district of Lower Manhattan.

== Career statistics ==
			Regular season					Playoffs
Season	Team	League	GP	G	A	Pts	PIM	GP	G	A	Pts	PIM
1998–99	Nor Wes Caps	PIJHL	27	11	12	23	173	—	—	—	—	—
1998–99	Burnaby Bulldogs	BCHL	6	0	2	2	2	—	—	—	—	—
1999–2000	Victoria Salsa	BCHL	58	13	21	34	285	6	0	2	2	31
2000–01	Victoria Salsa	BCHL	57	34	34	68	196	24	14	11	25	54
2001–02	University of Alaska Fairbanks	CCHA	37	18	13	31	101	—	—	—	—	—
2002–03	University of Alaska Fairbanks	CCHA	16	2	5	7	42	—	—	—	—	—
2003–04	University of Alaska Fairbanks	CCHA	36	16	8	24	132	—	—	—	—	—
2003–04	Albany River Rats	AHL	9	2	1	3	14	—	—	—	—	—
2004–05	Albany River Rats	AHL	71	11	17	28	220	—	—	—	—	—
2005–06	Albany River Rats	AHL	73	16	14	30	180	—	—	—	—	—
2006–07	Lowell Devils	AHL	39	9	8	17	111	—	—	—	—	—
2006–07	Houston Aeros	AHL	19	2	3	5	58	—	—	—	—	—
2007–08	Houston Aeros	AHL	12	4	4	8	46	—	—	—	—	—
2007–08	Minnesota Wild	NHL	55	7	7	14	141	5	1	0	1	16
2008–09	New York Rangers	NHL	54	8	8	16	122	4	0	0	0	14
2009–10	New York Rangers	NHL	41	3	4	7	89	—	—	—	—	—
2010–11	Anaheim Ducks	NHL	12	0	0	0	43	—	—	—	—	—
2010–11	Syracuse Crunch	AHL	2	0	0	0	5	—	—	—	—	—
2010–11	Toronto Marlies	AHL	26	3	4	7	61	—	—	—	—	—
2011–12	Connecticut Whale	AHL	23	4	3	7	23	—	—	—	—	—
AHL totals			274	51	54	105	718	—	—	—	—	—
NHL totals			162	18	19	37	395	9	1	0	1	30

== Awards and honours ==
Award	Year
College
All-CCHA Rookie Team	2002

Awards and achievements
Preceded by Brian Maloney	Terry Flanagan Memorial Award; 2003–04	Succeeded by Jordan Sigalet
