= Steve Downie =

Canadian ice hockey player (born 1987)

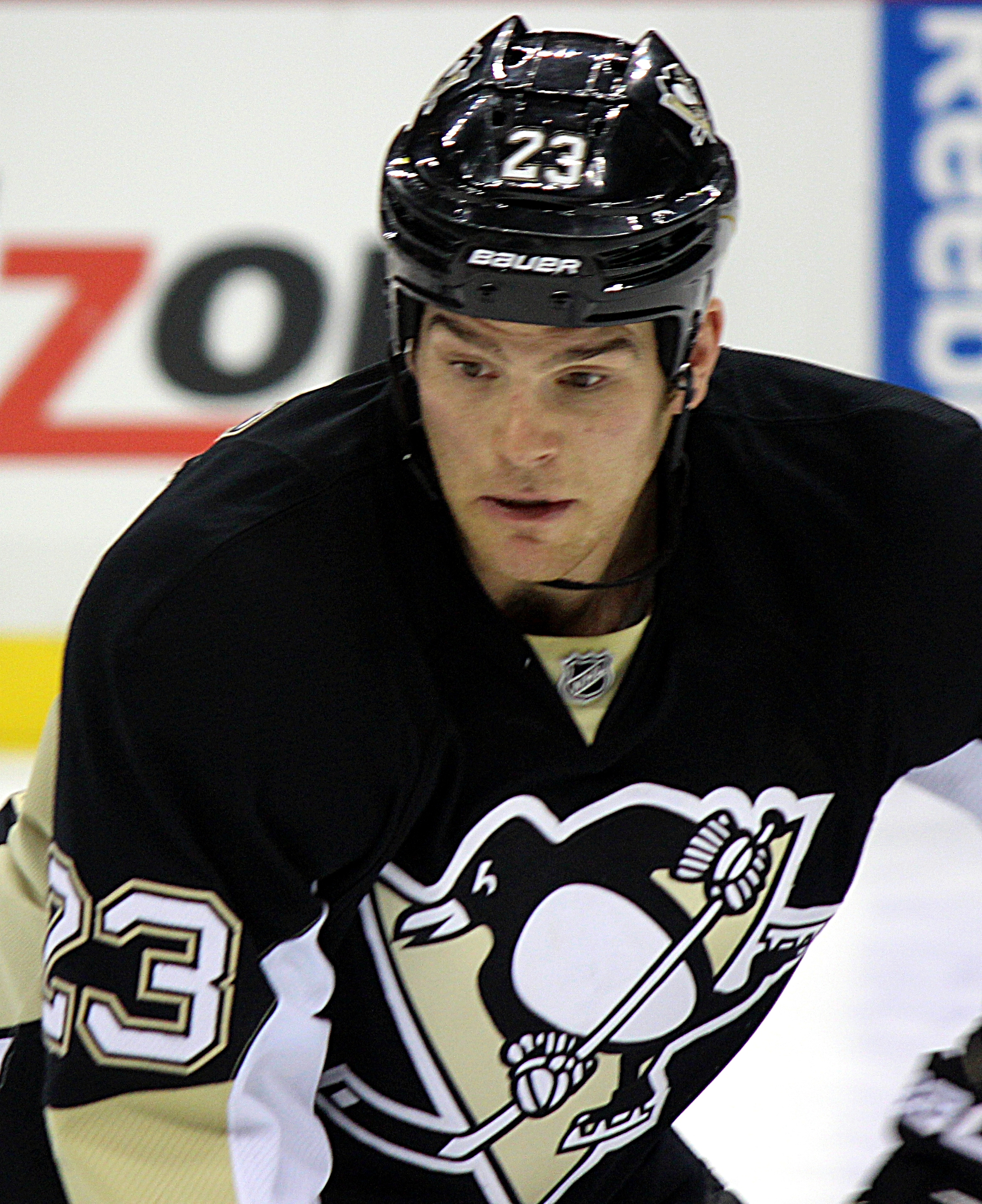
- Downie with the Pittsburgh Penguins in December 2014
- Born: April 3, 1987 (age 39) Newmarket, Ontario, Canada
- Height: 5 ft 11 in (180 cm)
- Weight: 191 lb (87 kg; 13 st 9 lb)
- Position: Right wing
- Shot: Right
- Played for: Philadelphia Flyers; Tampa Bay Lightning; Colorado Avalanche; Pittsburgh Penguins; Arizona Coyotes
- National team: Canada
- NHL draft: 29th overall, 2005; Philadelphia Flyers
- Playing career: 2007–2016

Steve Downie (born April 3, 1987) is a Canadian former professional ice hockey forward who played in the National Hockey League (NHL) for the Philadelphia Flyers, Tampa Bay Lightning, Colorado Avalanche, Pittsburgh Penguins and Arizona Coyotes, with the Flyers having drafted him in the first round, 29th overall, in 2005.

== Playing career ==
Downie grew up in Holland Landing, Ontario, the younger son of Anne and the late John Downie. He has one sibling, brother Greg, and attended Sacred Heart High School in Newmarket. He played minor ice hockey for the York-Simcoe Express AAA organization of the Ontario Minor Hockey Association (OMHA), and competed in the 2001 Quebec International Pee-Wee Hockey Tournament with them. Downie led his Express Bantam team to the All-Ontario AAA Championship in April 2002. He later attended St. Joseph's Catholic High School in Windsor, Ontario, in 2004. He was drafted in the first round, 16th overall, by the Windsor Spitfires in the 2003 OHL Priority Selection.

=== Junior ===
Downie was selected in the first round, 29th overall, in the 2005 NHL entry draft by the Philadelphia Flyers. Not long after being drafted, Downie was suspended for five games early in the 2005–06 OHL season for an on-ice altercation with teammate Akim Aliu. During a practice on September 28, 2005, Downie cross-checked Aliu in the face without warning, knocking out seven of his teeth, and then proceeded to fight his younger teammate. The incident stemmed from 16-year-old Aliu's refusal to take part in a hazing incident, where he would have been forced to stand naked in a cramped bus bathroom with other rookies. The team suspended Downie for five games and Aliu for one, and Downie was told to undergo professional counseling. Spitfires Head Coach Moe Mantha Jr. was suspended by the OHL and later fired by the team, and the team was fined $35,000 by the OHL. Downie left the team, requesting a trade, and was eventually traded to the Peterborough Petes in exchange for Peter Aston. In 2020, Aliu would reflect on the incident in an opinion piece entitled "Hockey Is Not For Everyone". Aliu described other hazing incidents leading to the attack and stated he viewed them as being racially motivated, calling Downie a "racist sociopath" and further remarking "He looked at me and saw a black boy with a weird accent — and didn’t like me because of it. I was attacked because of the color of my skin."

Brent Sutter named Downie to the Canadian junior team for the 2006 World Junior Ice Hockey Championships in Vancouver. He made a name for himself at the tournament, contributing to Canada's gold medal-winning effort by scoring two goals and four assists in six games while also being named to the all-tournament team.

On May 30, 2006, the Philadelphia Flyers announced that they had signed Downie to a three-year, entry-level contract. "It is unbelievable," said Downie in a Flyers press release. "[Signing with the Flyers] was one of the goals that I had set at the beginning of the year and I am just very thankful for this chance. I’m a gritty, physical player and I also am an offensive player as well."

After attending Flyers' training camp in the Fall and playing in several pre-season games, however, the club returned Downie to Peterborough. Downie returned to the international stage yet again in December 2006, participating in the 2007 World Junior Ice Hockey Championships in Leksand and Mora, Sweden. On January 5, 2007, Canada won the gold medal for the first time on European ice since 1997 with a 4–2 victory over Russia. Throughout the whole tournament, however, Downie was involved in OHL trade rumours. On January 8, 2007, Downie was indeed traded to the Kitchener Rangers in exchange for Yves Bastien, the Rangers' second-round picks in the 2007 and 2008 OHL Priority Selections, as well as the 2007 second-round pick of the Brampton Battalion.

=== Professional ===
In his first full professional season in 2007–08, Downie's professional career got off to an inauspicious start during a pre-season game against the Ottawa Senators on September 25, 2007. He was involved in an incident in which he checked unsuspecting left winger Dean McAmmond into the boards, while his feet were off the ice. Due to the extent of McAmmond's injury and having left his skates during the hit, Downie was suspended by the NHL for 20 games three days later for deliberate injury to McAmmond, as the NHL were cracking down on any play resulting in a head injury. To date, it is the fifth-longest suspension given by the League. One day after the NHL suspension was announced, the Flyers announced they had sent Downie down to the team's American Hockey League (AHL) affiliate, the Philadelphia Phantoms. Per AHL by-laws, Downie was considered automatically ineligible to play pending a review by the AHL (as the AHL honours NHL suspensions). AHL President David Andrews suspended Downie for the first month of the AHL season as a result of the injuries to McAmmond.

After serving his suspension in the AHL, Downie made his long-awaited NHL regular season debut with the Flyers on December 5, 2007, against the Minnesota Wild. He scored his first career NHL goal over one month later, on January 5, 2008, against Andrew Raycroft of the Toronto Maple Leafs. During the game, Downie got into a scuffle with Maple Leafs forward Jason Blake. While the linesmen were attempting to keep them apart, Downie got his left arm loose and sucker-punched Blake in the left eye while Blake's arms and hands were still tied up by the other linesman. During a game against the New York Rangers on February 9, 2008, Downie was hip-checked by Rangers defenceman Fedor Tyutin, and his skate hit linesman Pat Dapuzzo in the face. Dapuzzo required 60 stitches to reattach his nose, suffered ten facial fractures and was forced to retire as a result. During the 2008 Stanley Cup playoffs, in Game 3 of the Eastern Conference Finals on May 13, 2008, Downie hit Petr Sýkora as the play ended on Ryan Malone's goal that gave the Pittsburgh Penguins a 3–1 lead. Sýkora did not have the puck when Downie hit him.

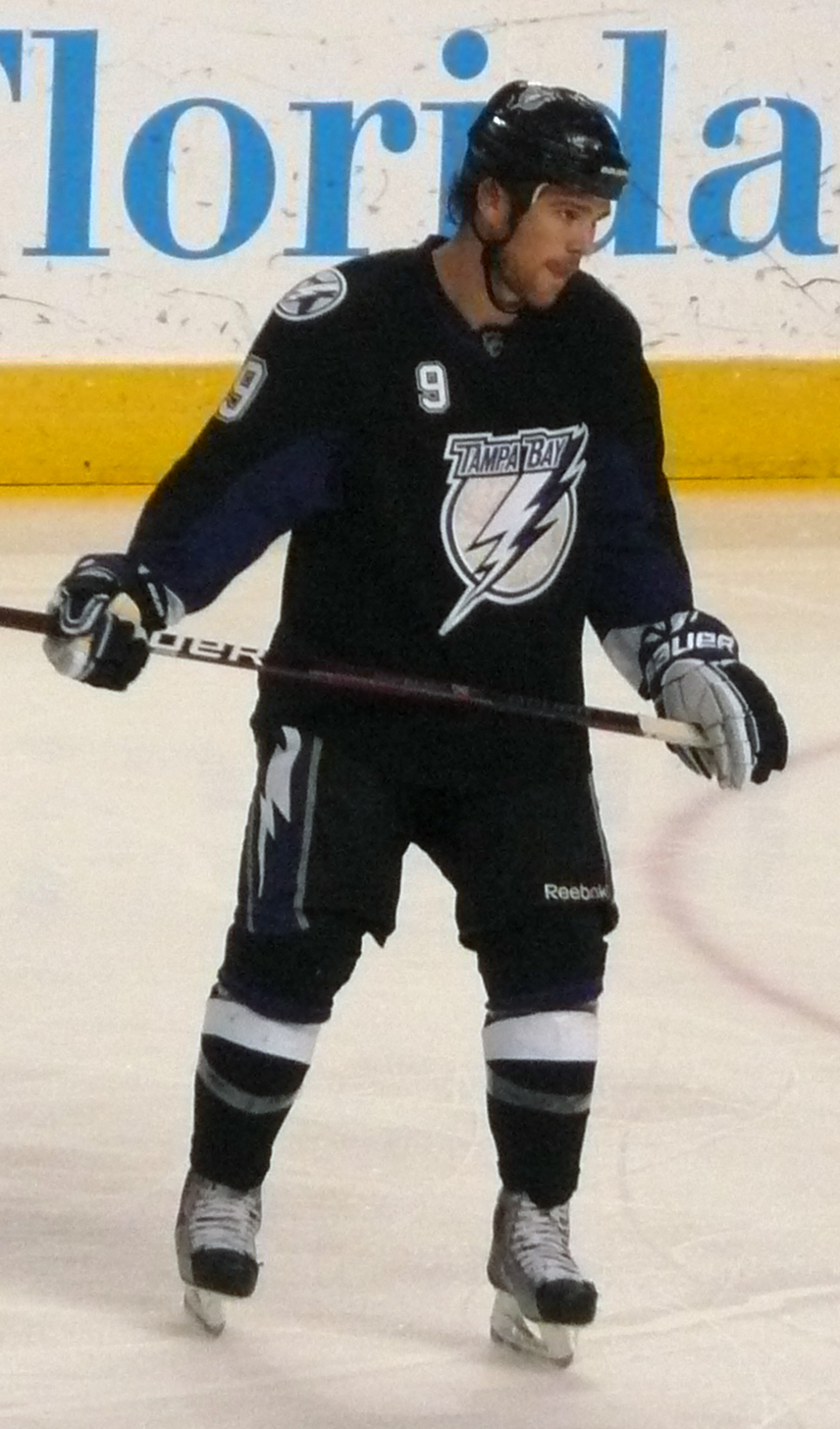
Downie with the Tampa Bay Lightning in March 2010.

In the following season, 2008–09, Downie initially made the Flyers' opening night roster before being later demoted to Phantoms. On November 7, 2008, Downie was traded by the Flyers to the Tampa Bay Lightning, along with Steve Eminger, in exchange for defenceman Matt Carle. Downie was immediately assigned to Tampa Bay's AHL affiliate, the Norfolk Admirals, before he was recalled and made his Lightning debut in a 4–2 defeat against the Minnesota Wild on November 28, 2008. Downie continued to split the season between Norfolk and Tampa Bay, and his reputation for unnecessary aggressive behaviour was further developed on February 28, 2009, after he slashed a linesman, Mike Hamilton, in the shin following a controversial empty-net goal in a game against the Hershey Bears, receiving a game misconduct for physical abuse of an official. Under AHL rules, the penalty carried an automatic 20-game suspension, which was Downie's second lengthy suspension. He would later make his return in the NHL regular season finale game for the Lightning.

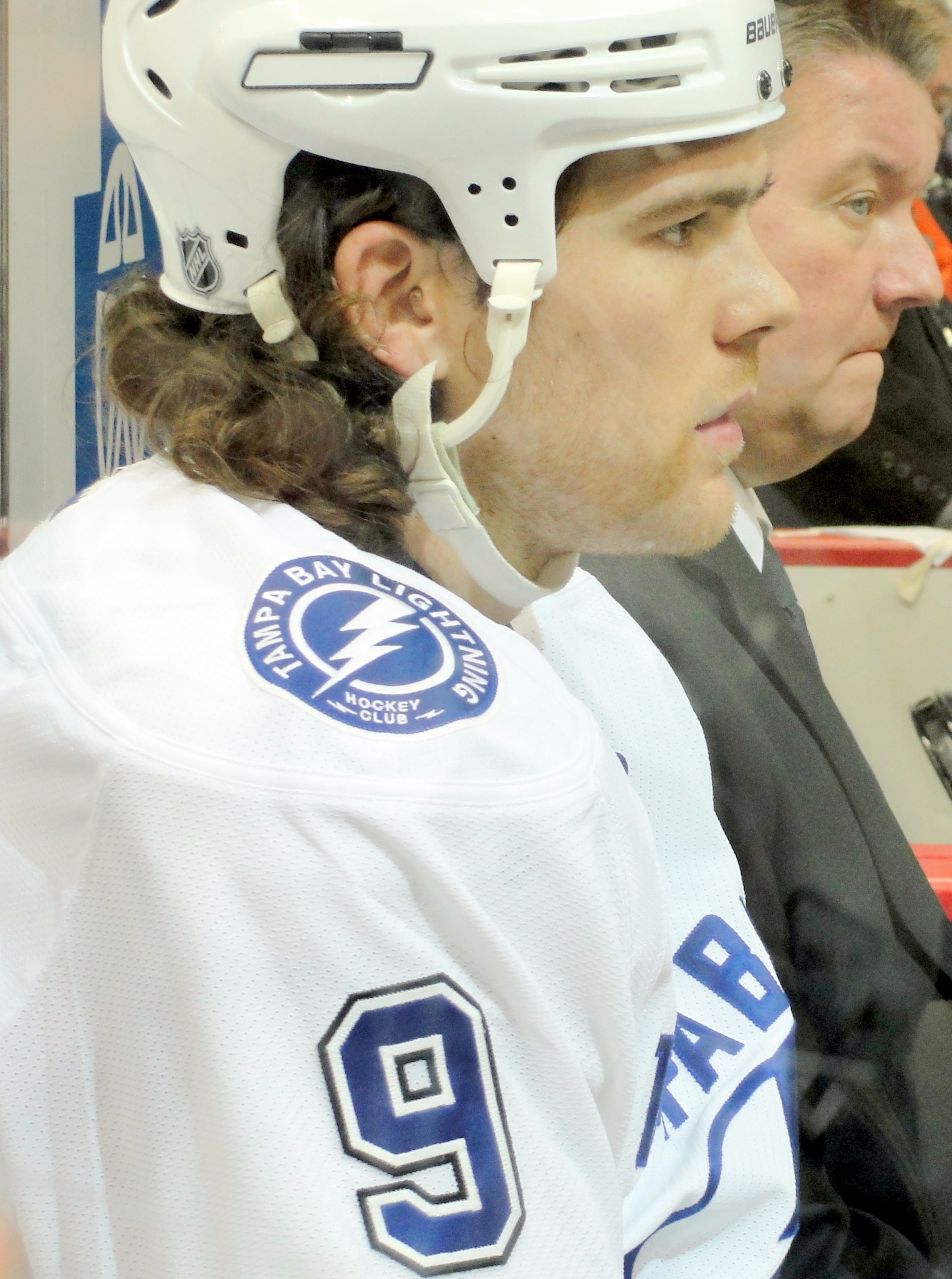
Downie with the Lightning in February 2012.

In the 2009–10 season, with the intention to curb his on-ice aggression positively, whilst under the influence of former agitator and then-Lightning Head Coach Rick Tocchet, Downie played his first full season in the NHL and recorded a career-high 22 goals and 46 points. Downie also became the first player since Theoren Fleury in 2002 to score 20 goals and record over 200 penalty minutes in a single season.

In March 2010, Downie was fined for a hit on the Pittsburgh Penguins' Sidney Crosby. Downie stated that Colin Campbell, League disciplinarian, told him it was a "dangerous play." Downie finished his first full season with 46 points in 79 games. After a successful NHL season, he was then selected to participate in the 2010 World Championships for Team Canada.

Prior to the commencement of the 2010–11 season, on August 25, 2010, Downie re-signed with the Lightning on a two-year contract worth $3.7 million. Having established himself offensively with Tampa, Downie's versatility and checking game helped provide 32 points in 57 games, whilst finishing with 171 penalty minutes to place tenth in the League. In contributing to the Lightning's return to the Stanley Cup playoffs in 2011, Downie led the team in plus-minus rating and finished fourth in team scoring with 14 points, as the Lightning ultimately reached the Eastern Conference Finals, falling to the eventual Stanley Cup champions, the Boston Bruins.

At the beginning of the 2011–12 season, Downie appeared in his 200th career NHL game against the Washington Capitals on October 10, 2011. He later set a Lightning franchise record for two quickest goals by an individual when he scored twice within the span of 11 seconds against Pittsburgh on February 12, 2012. Whilst in the final year of his contract, and with the Lightning under-performing, Downie was traded to the Colorado Avalanche in exchange for defenceman Kyle Quincey, who was himself traded later that same day to the Detroit Red Wings, on February 21, 2012. The next day, Downie made his Avalanche debut in a 4–1 victory over the Los Angeles Kings. Immediately placed on the Avalanche's top line alongside Ryan O'Reilly and Gabriel Landeskog, Downie provided instant success and coincidentally became the first Avalanche player since Theoren Fleury in 1999 to score seven points in his first four games with the club. Downie continued to score 13 points in 20 games whilst hampered by a lingering shoulder injury as the Avalanche failed to qualify for the 2012 playoffs. He achieved a career-high combined 27 assists for the season before he was shut down to endure off-season surgery to repair a separated shoulder.

On June 29, 2012, the Avalanche re-signed Downie to a two-year, $5.3 million contract. Having used the NHL lock-out to recuperate from off-season surgery, Downie entered the shortened 2012–13 season in full health, only to suffer a season-ending knee injury in just his second game of the campaign; he was injured trying to hit Davis Drewiske of the Los Angeles Kings, requiring surgery to repair a torn anterior cruciate ligament (ACL) in his right knee.

On October 31, 2013, after producing seven points in 11 games with the Avalanche to start the 2013–14 season, Downie was traded back to the Philadelphia Flyers in exchange for Maxime Talbot.

On July 2, 2014, Downie was signed as a free agent by the Pittsburgh Penguins to a one-year, $1 million contract. Downie established himself amongst the Penguins lower checking lines, and proved good value for his contract in the 2014–15 season. He contributed with 14 goals and 28 points as he led the league in penalty minutes with 238.

At the conclusion of his contract, Downie opted to part ways with the Penguins and sign as a free agent to a one-year contract with the Arizona Coyotes on July 1, 2015.

== Career statistics ==
=== Regular season and playoffs ===
Bold indicates led league

			Regular season					Playoffs
Season	Team	League	GP	G	A	Pts	PIM	GP	G	A	Pts	PIM
2002–03	York Simcoe Express	Bantam	14	5	13	18	27	—	—	—	—	—
2002–03	Aurora Tigers	OPJHL	34	12	13	25	55	—	—	—	—	—
2003–04	Windsor Spitfires	OHL	49	7	9	16	90	4	0	1	1	27
2004–05	Windsor Spitfires	OHL	61	21	52	73	179	11	4	5	9	49
2005–06	Windsor Spitfires	OHL	1	3	0	3	4	—	—	—	—	—
2005–06	Peterborough Petes	OHL	34	16	34	50	109	19	6	15	21	38
2006–07	Peterborough Petes	OHL	28	23	36	59	92	—	—	—	—	—
2006–07	Kitchener Rangers	OHL	17	12	21	33	32	9	8	14	22	15
2006–07	Philadelphia Phantoms	AHL	1	0	0	0	0	—	—	—	—	—
2007–08	Philadelphia Phantoms	AHL	21	5	12	17	114	—	—	—	—	—
2007–08	Philadelphia Flyers	NHL	32	6	6	12	73	6	0	1	1	10
2008–09	Philadelphia Flyers	NHL	6	0	0	0	11	—	—	—	—	—
2008–09	Philadelphia Phantoms	AHL	4	1	7	8	23	—	—	—	—	—
2008–09	Norfolk Admirals	AHL	23	8	17	25	107	—	—	—	—	—
2008–09	Tampa Bay Lightning	NHL	23	3	3	6	54	—	—	—	—	—
2009–10	Tampa Bay Lightning	NHL	79	22	24	46	208	—	—	—	—	—
2010–11	Tampa Bay Lightning	NHL	57	10	22	32	171	17	2	12	14	40
2011–12	Tampa Bay Lightning	NHL	55	12	16	28	121	—	—	—	—	—
2011–12	Colorado Avalanche	NHL	20	2	11	13	16	—	—	—	—	—
2012–13	Colorado Avalanche	NHL	2	0	1	1	6	—	—	—	—	—
2013–14	Colorado Avalanche	NHL	11	1	6	7	36	—	—	—	—	—
2013–14	Philadelphia Flyers	NHL	51	3	14	17	70	—	—	—	—	—
2014–15	Pittsburgh Penguins	NHL	72	14	14	28	**238**	5	0	2	2	4
2015–16	Arizona Coyotes	NHL	26	3	3	6	53	—	—	—	—	—
2015–16	Springfield Falcons	AHL	8	1	1	2	24	—	—	—	—	—
NHL totals			434	76	120	196	1057	28	2	15	17	54

=== International ===
Medal record

Representing Canada

World Junior Championships
Gold medal – first place	2007 Sweden	
Gold medal – first place	2006 Canada	

Year	Team	Event	Result	GP	G	A	Pts	PIM
2004	Canada Ontario	U17	1st place, gold medalist(s)	6	3	3	6	8
2006	Canada	WJC	1st place, gold medalist(s)	6	2	4	6	16
2007	Canada	WJC	1st place, gold medalist(s)	6	3	3	6	16
2010	Canada	WC	7th	7	2	0	2	28
Junior totals				18	8	10	18	40
Senior totals				7	2	0	2	28

== Personal life ==
Downie's father, John Downie, died in a car accident in 1996 while driving Steve to a hockey practice. He is deaf in his right ear due to the hearing disorder otosclerosis and wears a hearing aid.

Awards and achievements
Preceded by Mike Richards	Philadelphia Flyers' first-round draft pick 2005	Succeeded by Claude Giroux
