= Brett Leonhardt =

Canadian ice hockey player

- Born: September 21, 1982 (age 43) Kitchener, Ontario, Canada
- Height: 6 ft 7 in (201 cm)
- Weight: 185 lb (84 kg; 13 st 3 lb)
- Position: Goaltender
- Caught: Right
- Playing career: 2008–2008

Brett Leonhardt (born September 21, 1982) is a former ice hockey goaltender for the Kitchener Dutchmen of the Greater Ontario Junior Hockey League (GOJHL), the State University of New York at Oswego of the State University of New York Athletic Conference (SUNYAC), and Neumann College of ECAC West. He is currently an assistant coach with the Washington Capitals of the National Hockey League (NHL). He suited up twice as an emergency backup goaltender (EBUG) for the Washington Capitals, on December 12, 2008, and November 29, 2013.

== Career ==
Leonhardt was a web producer with the Capitals from the fall of 2007 until February 2011, when he left for a video editing job with the NHL in Toronto. He returned to the Capitals in 2012 as their video coach.

As a coach, he won the Stanley Cup with the Washington Capitals in 2018. Leonhardt was promoted to Assistant Coach-Video starting the Washington Capitals 2018–19 season.

== Washington call-ups ==
On December 12, 2008, the Capitals were preparing to host the Ottawa Senators. During the morning skate, starting goaltender José Théodore suffered a hip flexor injury, forcing the Capitals to recall Semyon Varlamov from their American Hockey League (AHL) affiliate, the Hershey Bears so that he could back up goaltender Brent Johnson. However, Varlamov was with the Bears in San Antonio, Texas and was unable to make it to Washington in time to start the game as the backup goaltender. As a result, the Capitals were forced to dress three goaltenders, signing Leonhardt, the team's web producer, to an amateur tryout contract before the game to back up Brent Johnson until the arrival of Varlamov. Because of his experience in NCAA Division III ice hockey with the State University of New York at Oswego and Neumann College, as well as the Kitchener Dutchmen of the GOJHL, Leonhardt, nicknamed "Stretch" due to his height, had previously participated in on-ice practice sessions with the Capitals, filling in when an additional goaltender was needed. Varlamov arrived 9:03 into the first period and replaced Leonhardt as Johnson's backup for the remainder of the game. At 6 feet 7 inches (2.01 metres) tall, had Leonhardt played in the game, he would have tied Ben Bishop as the tallest goalie in NHL history. He did not receive any pay for his contract.

On November 29, 2013, Capitals starting goalie Michal Neuvirth was injured during warmups before a game against the Montreal Canadiens and scratched from the lineup. Braden Holtby filled in as the starter and with no time to call anyone up from the minors, Leonhardt served as emergency backup goalie. Leonhardt still performed his duties as video coach during the second intermission wearing full goalie gear.

== Career statistics ==
Season	Team	League	GP	W	L	T	MIN	GA	SA	SO	GAA	SV%
2003–04	Oswego Lakers	SUNYAC	3	1	0	0	128:41	3	52	0	1.40	.942
2004–05	Oswego Lakers	SUNYAC	10	7	1	2	609:19	27	295	1	2.66	.908
2005–06	Neumann Knights	ECAC West	4	2	1	0	200:00	10	98	0	3.00	.898
2006–07	Neumann Knights	ECAC West	4	3	0	0	139:36	5	54	0	2.15	.907
College totals			21	13	2	0	1,077:36	45	499	1	2.51	.917
