= Tyler Sloan =

Canadian ice hockey player

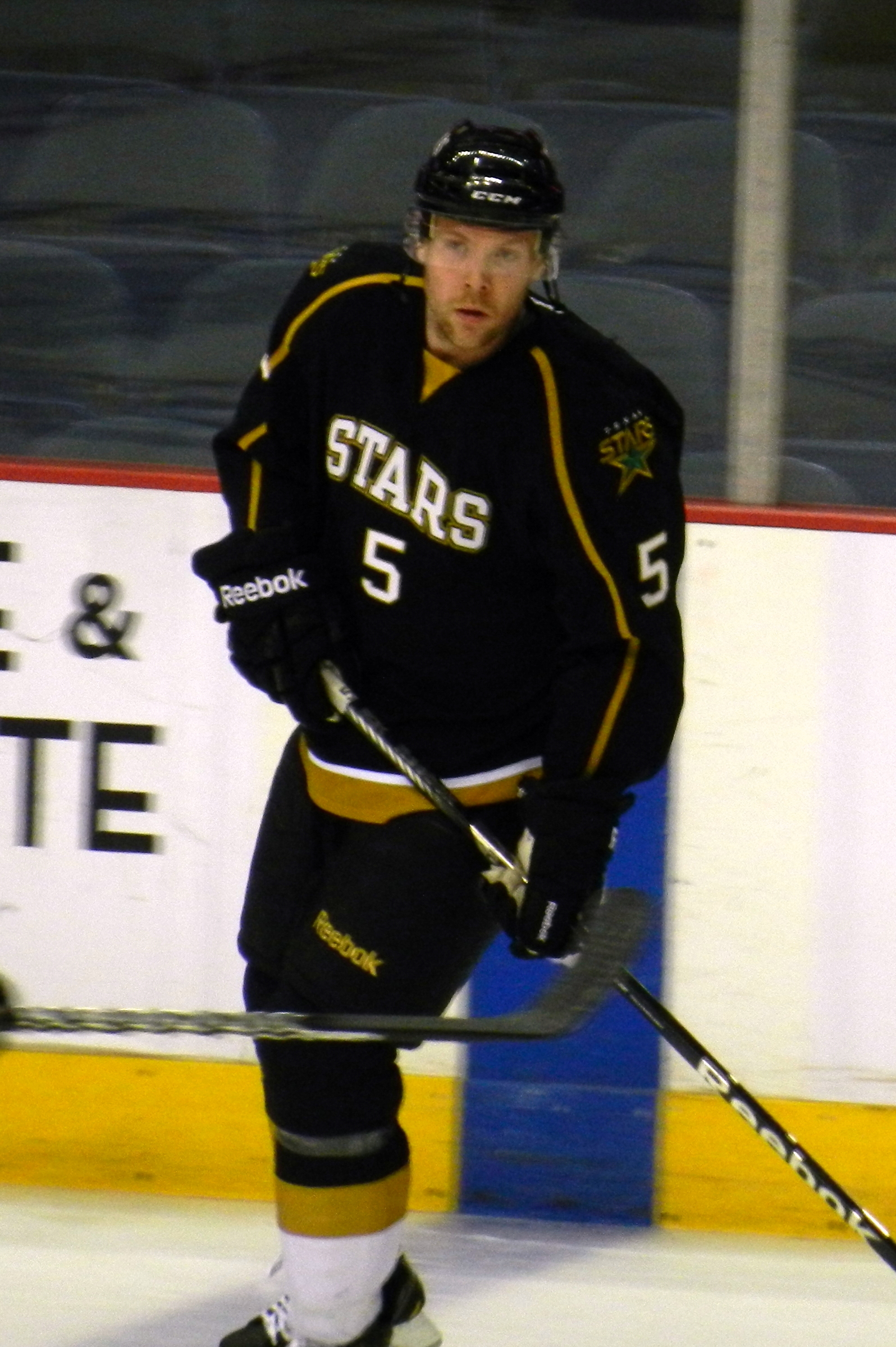
- Sloan with the Texas Stars in 2013
- Born: March 15, 1981 (age 45) Calgary, Alberta, Canada
- Height: 6 ft 3 in (191 cm)
- Weight: 205 lb (93 kg; 14 st 9 lb)
- Position: Defence
- Shot: Left
- Played for: Washington Capitals
- NHL draft: Undrafted
- Playing career: 2002–2013

Tyler Sloan (born March 15, 1981) is a Canadian former professional ice hockey defenceman. An undrafted player, Sloan spent seven years in the minor leagues before making his National Hockey League debut for the Washington Capitals in his hometown of Calgary against the Flames.

== Playing career ==
Sloan played junior hockey for the Calgary Royals of the Alberta Junior Hockey League and Kamloops Blazers of the Western Hockey League. Though undrafted, he was signed by the Columbus Blue Jackets and assigned to the Syracuse Crunch of the American Hockey League at the end of the 2001–02 season. Sloan spent the next seven seasons bouncing around the minors, playing for the Dayton Bombers and Las Vegas Wranglers of the ECHL, as well as the AHL's Manitoba Moose and Hershey Bears. In 2006, Sloan and the Bears won the Calder Cup championship.

Sloan was recalled by the Washington Capitals early in the 2008–09 season, where he made his National Hockey League debut for the Capitals in his hometown of Calgary against the Flames on October 21, 2008. Sloan made an immediate impact for the Capitals, levelling Calgary's Daymond Langkow with a large bodycheck, and earning the Capitals a nine-minute powerplay in the aftermath. He scored his first NHL goal on October 25 against Marty Turco of the Dallas Stars.

Sloan was sent down to Hershey on January 11, 2009, as several injured Capitals returned to action. He was recalled on May 3, 2009, during the Capitals' playoff series with Pittsburgh along with Karl Alzner and recorded an assist in Game 2 of the series the following night.

On June 27, 2011, the Capitals placed him on waivers, with the possible intention of buying out his contract. A month later on July 28, Sloan was signed as a free agent by the Nashville Predators on a one-year deal.

On July 6, 2012, Sloan signed a one-year, two-way contract with the Dallas Stars. The deal is worth $600,000 when Sloan plays for the Stars, and $105,000 when he plays for the Stars’ AHL affiliate, the Texas Stars.

== Personal life ==
Sloan's sister, Tara, was a five-time Canadian national swimming champion and Canadian record holder who was set to compete at the swimming trials for the 2000 Summer Olympics when she was killed in a roll-over accident near Medicine Hat, Alberta in March 2000. Tyler used the dedication his sister showed in attempting to win a spot on the Canadian Olympic team as inspiration in his own hockey career. His sister's journal of her attempts to qualify for the Olympics motivated Tyler: "Swimmers are tremendous athletes. Their work ethic is unparalleled. I saw what it took for her to get there. That was important because I didn't realize what it took to get to this level," he told The Globe and Mail newspaper.

== Career statistics ==
			Regular season					Playoffs
Season	Team	League	GP	G	A	Pts	PIM	GP	G	A	Pts	PIM
2000–01	Kamloops Blazers	WHL	70	5	28	33	146	4	0	0	0	4
2001–02	Kamloops Blazers	WHL	70	3	29	32	89	4	0	0	0	15
2001–02	Syracuse Crunch	AHL	2	0	0	0	5	—	—	—	—	—
2002–03	Dayton Bombers	ECHL	14	1	2	3	22	—	—	—	—	—
2002–03	Syracuse Crunch	AHL	29	2	1	3	22	—	—	—	—	—
2003–04	Syracuse Crunch	AHL	69	2	4	6	50	7	0	0	0	8
2004–05	Dayton Bombers	ECHL	43	6	11	17	84	—	—	—	—	—
2004–05	Syracuse Crunch	AHL	14	0	2	2	18	—	—	—	—	—
2005–06	Las Vegas Wranglers	ECHL	48	4	16	20	71	13	0	4	4	27
2005–06	Manitoba Moose	AHL	4	0	0	0	0	—	—	—	—	—
2005–06	Hershey Bears	AHL	—	—	—	—	—	2	0	1	1	2
2006–07	Hershey Bears	AHL	68	2	9	11	104	17	0	7	7	30
2007–08	Hershey Bears	AHL	56	1	7	8	90	5	0	0	0	8
2008–09	Hershey Bears	AHL	46	2	10	12	61	16	0	5	5	14
2008–09	Washington Capitals	NHL	26	1	4	5	14	2	0	1	1	0
2009–10	Washington Capitals	NHL	40	2	4	6	22	2	0	0	0	0
2009–10	Hershey Bears	AHL	2	0	1	1	0	—	—	—	—	—
2010–11	Washington Capitals	NHL	33	1	5	6	14	—	—	—	—	—
2010–11	Hershey Bears	AHL	6	0	2	2	6	—	—	—	—	—
2011–12	Milwaukee Admirals	AHL	62	1	9	10	58	3	0	0	0	0
2012–13	Texas Stars	AHL	42	3	6	9	55	1	0	0	0	0
NHL totals			99	4	13	17	50	4	0	1	1	0
