= Steve Eminger =

Canadian ice hockey player (born 1983)

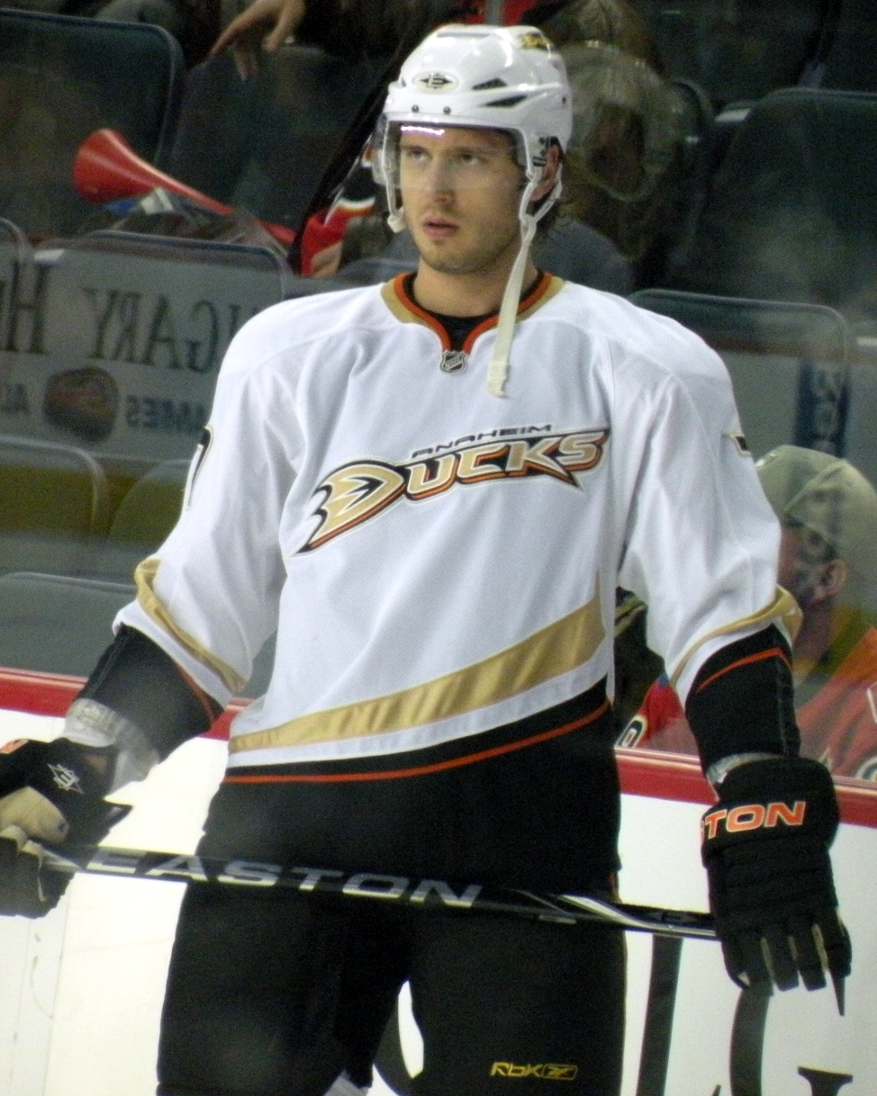
- Born: October 31, 1983 (age 43) Woodbridge, Ontario, Canada
- Height: 6 ft 1 in (185 cm)
- Weight: 202 lb (92 kg; 14 st 6 lb)
- Position: Defence
- Shot: Right
- Played for: Washington Capitals; Philadelphia Flyers; Tampa Bay Lightning; Florida Panthers; Anaheim Ducks; New York Rangers; Lake Erie Monsters
- NHL draft: 12th overall, 2002; Washington Capitals
- Playing career: 2003–2016

Steve Eminger (born October 31, 1983) is a Canadian former professional ice hockey defenceman who played in the National Hockey League (NHL).

== Playing career ==
Eminger, who is also known for his physical play, started his hockey career with the Kitchener Rangers of the Ontario Hockey League in 1999. He was drafted in the first round, 12th overall by the Washington Capitals at the 2002 NHL entry draft. He made his NHL debut the next season, but after 17 games in Washington he was sent back down to Kitchener. Kitchener was strengthened by Eminger's return, and they won the Memorial Cup.

Since leaving junior hockey, Eminger split his time between the Capitals and their AHL affiliate, the Portland Pirates. Despite the lofty projections that came with his first-round-pick status, Eminger has failed to live up to expectations. Throughout the 2007–08 NHL season, the final season of his contract, Eminger spent a great deal of time as a healthy scratch. However, during the 2008 playoffs the Capitals were decimated by injuries and Eminger was put into the lineup with a larger role. During these playoffs, Eminger suddenly found his niche and proved himself to be a solid defenceman. During the 2008 NHL entry draft, Eminger, along with the 84th overall pick (Jacob De Serres) were traded to the Philadelphia Flyers for the 27th pick overall (John Carlson).

On June 29, 2008, Eminger and the Flyers agreed to a one-year contract. After 12 games with the Flyers, Eminger was traded to Tampa Bay on November 7, 2008, along with Steve Downie and a 4th-round draft pick for Matt Carle and a 3rd-round draft pick.

On March 9, 2009, on the day of the trade deadline, Tampa Bay traded Eminger to the Florida Panthers in exchange for Noah Welch and a 3rd round draft pick.

On September 4, 2009, Eminger was signed as a free agent by the Anaheim Ducks on a two-year deal.

On July 9, 2010, Eminger was traded to New York Rangers for Aaron Voros and Ryan Hillier. On September 10, 2012, Eminger agreed to a new contract with the Rangers.

After spending his professional career entirely on North American soil, Eminger signed as a free agent to his first contract abroad with Russian club CSKA Moscow of the Kontinental Hockey League on October 21, 2014. After producing just 2 assists in 25 games, Eminger was released from his KHL contract, and on January 24, 2014, Eminger joined the Norfolk Admirals after having cleared AHL waivers.

On September 5, 2014, the Boston Bruins announced that Eminger had signed a one-year contract with their AHL affiliate, the Providence Bruins. As a free agent in the summer and into the midpoint of the 2015-16 season, Eminger returned to play, signing a professional try-out contract with the Lake Erie Monsters of the AHL on January 21, 2016. Eminger ended his playing career after winning the Calder Cup with the Monsters during the 2015–16 season.

On June 14, 2017, Eminger was announced to have accepted a position as a professional scout for the New York Rangers.

== Personal life ==
Eminger is married to Lindsay Eminger.

== Career statistics ==
=== Regular season and playoffs ===
			Regular season					Playoffs
Season	Team	League	GP	G	A	Pts	PIM	GP	G	A	Pts	PIM
1998–99	Bramalea Blues	OPJHL	47	6	9	15	81	—	—	—	—	—
1999–2000	Kitchener Rangers	OHL	50	2	14	16	74	5	0	0	0	0
2000–01	Kitchener Rangers	OHL	54	6	26	32	66	—	—	—	—	—
2001–02	Kitchener Rangers	OHL	64	19	39	58	93	4	0	2	2	10
2002–03	Kitchener Rangers	OHL	23	2	27	29	40	21	3	8	11	44
2002–03	Washington Capitals	NHL	17	0	2	2	24	—	—	—	—	—
2003–04	Washington Capitals	NHL	41	0	4	4	45	—	—	—	—	—
2003–04	Portland Pirates	AHL	41	0	4	4	40	7	0	1	1	2
2004–05	Portland Pirates	AHL	62	3	17	20	40	—	—	—	—	—
2005–06	Washington Capitals	NHL	66	5	13	18	81	—	—	—	—	—
2006–07	Washington Capitals	NHL	68	1	16	17	63	—	—	—	—	—
2007–08	Washington Capitals	NHL	20	0	2	2	8	5	1	0	1	2
2008–09	Philadelphia Flyers	NHL	12	0	2	2	8	—	—	—	—	—
2008–09	Tampa Bay Lightning	NHL	50	4	19	23	36	—	—	—	—	—
2008–09	Florida Panthers	NHL	9	1	0	1	6	—	—	—	—	—
2009–10	Anaheim Ducks	NHL	63	4	12	16	30	—	—	—	—	—
2010–11	New York Rangers	NHL	65	2	4	6	22	—	—	—	—	—
2011–12	New York Rangers	NHL	42	2	3	5	28	4	0	0	0	0
2012–13	New York Rangers	NHL	35	0	3	3	8	11	0	2	2	4
2012–13	Connecticut Whale	AHL	4	1	0	1	0	—	—	—	—	—
2013–14	CSKA Moscow	KHL	25	0	2	2	10	—	—	—	—	—
2013–14	Norfolk Admirals	AHL	33	3	4	7	24	10	1	1	2	14
2014–15	Providence Bruins	AHL	62	4	19	23	60	1	0	0	0	0
2015–16	Lake Erie Monsters	AHL	19	5	9	14	14	13	1	7	8	4
NHL totals			488	19	80	99	359	20	1	2	3	6
AHL totals			221	16	53	69	178	31	2	9	11	20

Medal record

Representing Canada

World Junior Championships
Silver medal – second place	2003 Halifax	

=== International ===
Year	Team	Event	Result	GP	G	A	Pts	PIM
2000	Canada Ontario	U17	2nd place, silver medalist(s)	5	0	4	4	0
2003	Canada	WJC	2nd place, silver medalist(s)	6	0	2	2	16
Junior totals				11	0	6	6	16

== Awards and honors ==
Awards	Year
OHL
Second All-Star Team	2002
Memorial Cup	2003
Memorial Cup All-Star Team	2003
AHL
Calder Cup (Lake Erie Monsters)	2016

Awards and achievements
Preceded by Brian Sutherby	Washington Capitals first-round draft pick 2002	Succeeded by Alexander Semin
