= Daniel Cleary =

Canadian ice hockey player (born 1978)

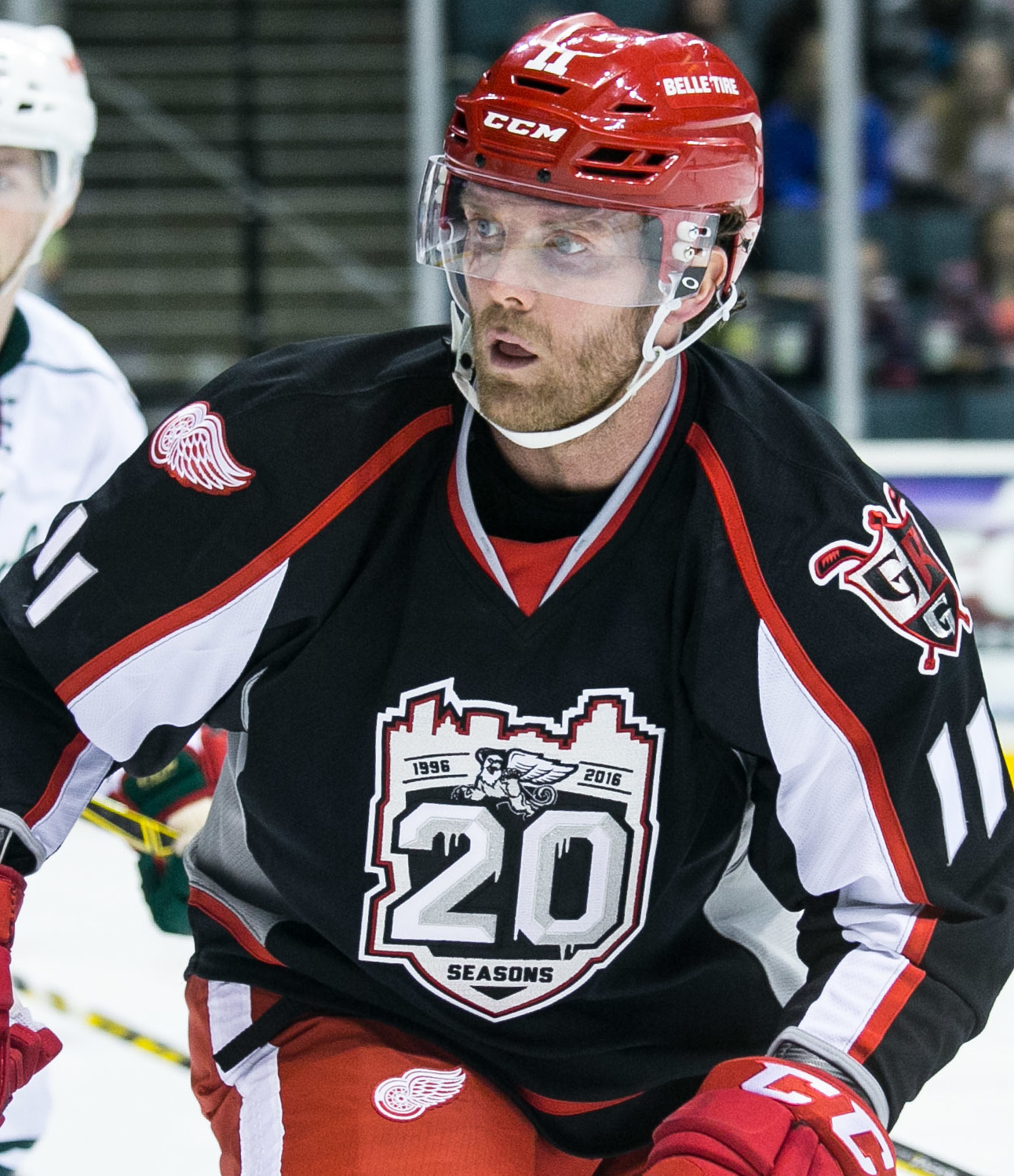
- Cleary with the Grand Rapids Griffins in 2015
- Born: December 18, 1978 (age 47) Carbonear, Newfoundland, Canada
- Height: 6 ft 0 in (183 cm)
- Weight: 208 lb (94 kg; 14 st 12 lb)
- Position: Left wing
- Shot: Left
- Played for: Chicago Blackhawks; Edmonton Oilers; Phoenix Coyotes; Mora IK; Detroit Red Wings
- National team: Canada
- NHL draft: 13th overall, 1997; Chicago Blackhawks
- Playing career: 1998–2017

Daniel Michael Cleary (born December 18, 1978) is a Canadian former professional ice hockey player who played in the National Hockey League (NHL) for the Chicago Blackhawks, Edmonton Oilers, Phoenix Coyotes and Detroit Red Wings. He currently serves as the Director of Player Development for Detroit.

He was a member of the 2008 Stanley Cup winning Red Wings team, and in doing so became the first player from Newfoundland and Labrador to win the Stanley Cup.

== Playing career ==
=== Junior ===
Cleary was born in Carbonear, Newfoundland, the location of the area's only hospital, and was raised in Harbour Grace, in a section of the town called Riverhead. After playing minor hockey in Harbour Grace, Cleary left home at age 15 to play for the Kingston Voyageurs of the Metro Junior Hockey League (OHA). He scored 46 points in 41 games with the Voyageurs that season, and was subsequently selected 11th overall by the Belleville Bulls of the OHL in the 1994 OHL Priority Selection.

Cleary spent his junior career with Belleville. After his rookie season in 1994–95, Cleary was named to the CHL All-Rookie Team and to the OHL First All-Rookie team. During Cleary's second year with the Bulls, he was second in the league in points with 115 and was named to the OHL First All-Star Team and the CHL Second All-Star Team. During the 1996–97 season, Cleary served as captain of the Bulls. While his offensive production dropped off from the previous season, he was nevertheless named to the OHL First All-Star Team, and was drafted 13th overall by the Chicago Blackhawks in the 1997 NHL entry draft. Cleary played his final year of major junior hockey during 1997–98, leading the OHL playoffs in assists (17) and points (23).

=== Professional ===
Just one year removed from junior hockey, Cleary was dealt to the Edmonton Oilers as part of a package that landed Boris Mironov in Chicago. Cleary played parts of four seasons in Edmonton. Cleary's $1 million contract was bought out by the Oilers in the summer of 2003. Shortly thereafter, he was signed to a much cheaper contract by the Phoenix Coyotes. He played, together with his former Edmonton teammate and friend Shawn Horcoff, for Mora IK of Elitserien during the 2004–05 NHL lockout. Following the lockout, Phoenix did not offer Cleary a qualifying contract. Cleary was invited to the Detroit Red Wings training camp, making the team out of camp and signing to a one-year contract with the Red Wings on October 4, 2005. In the 2005–06 season, Cleary established himself as a dependable role player as a defensive forward.

In the 2006–07 season, given an expanded role with the Wings, Cleary scored a career high 20 goals in 71 games. During the 2006–07 NHL playoff quarterfinals against Calgary, Cleary successfully converted a penalty shot while shorthanded; this was the first time it had been done in Detroit during the playoffs.

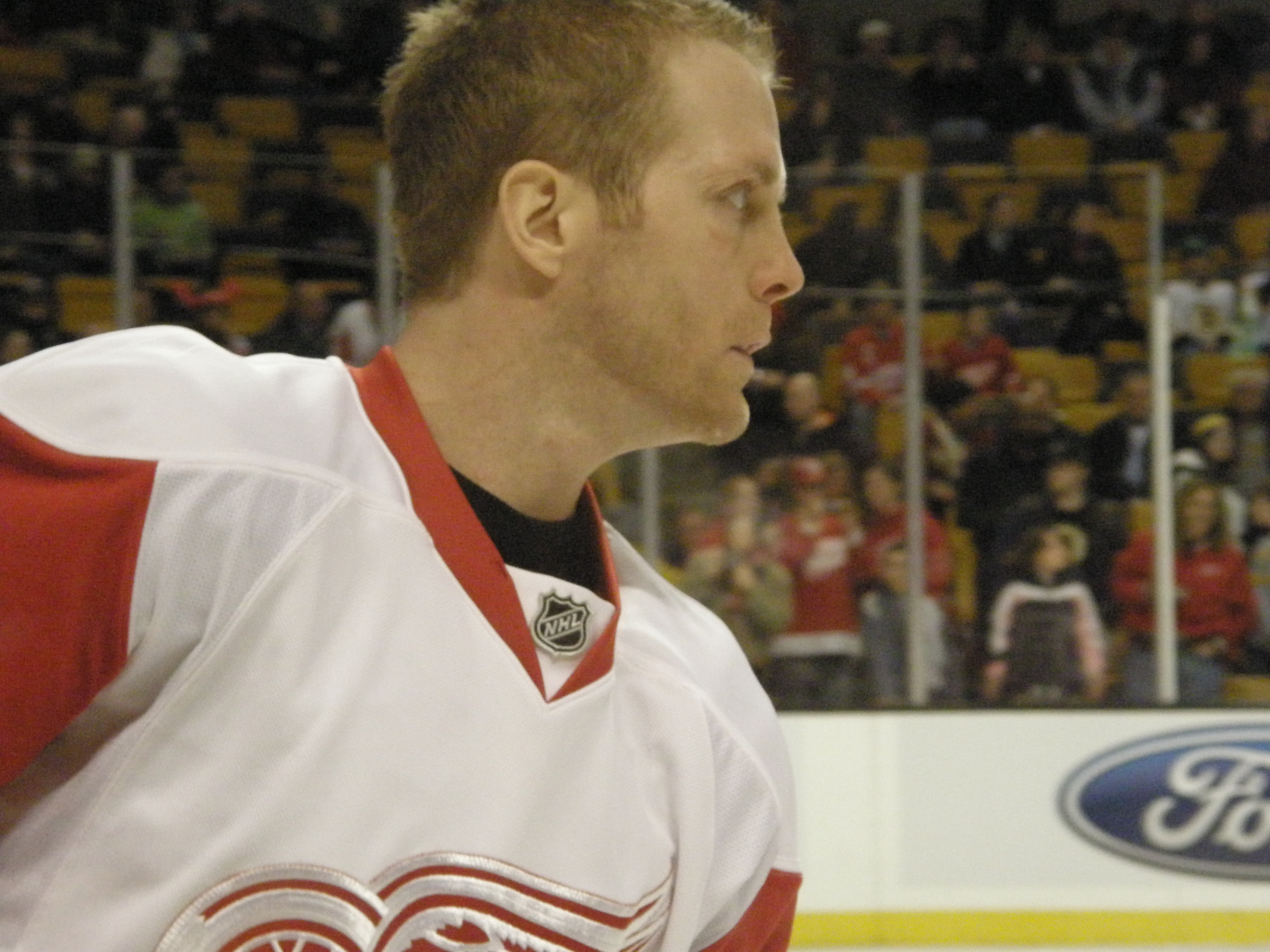
Cleary during his tenure with the Red Wings.

In the 2007–08 season, Cleary repeated the accomplishment of scoring 20 goals in the regular season. On February 9, 2008, Cleary suffered a broken jaw which forced him to miss 19 games. On March 11, 2008, Cleary signed a five-year contract extension with the Detroit Red Wings, worth $14 million.

On June 4, 2008, Cleary won the Stanley Cup with the Detroit Red Wings as they beat the Pittsburgh Penguins four games to two in the Stanley Cup Finals, becoming the first Newfoundlander to do so.

On June 30, 2008, Cleary brought the Stanley Cup home to Newfoundland. A packed lobby welcomed Cleary at the St. John's International Airport. Later that day, Cleary brought the Cup to the Janeway Children's Hospital. On July 1, 2008, Cleary brought the Stanley Cup back to his hometown of Harbour Grace, Newfoundland for a Canada Day celebration that included a parade and a concert. The event attracted an estimated 27,000 people. The event also attracted an estimated 103 individual media accreditations with media from across Canada and the United States landing in Harbour Grace to cover Dan Cleary's story.

The Newfoundland bluegrass/folk band Greeley's Reel recorded a "hockey anthem" version of their song "Come In" about Cleary after the win. The refrain specifically highlights the celebration that would occur "when Danny Cleary brings the Stanley Cup to Newfoundland." In addition to receiving extensive local radio airplay, the song appeared on CBC Television and a Fox Sports Detroit special.

In the 2009 Stanley Cup playoffs on May 14, 2009, Cleary scored the tie breaking, Western Conference semi-final series winning goal for the Detroit Red Wings against the Anaheim Ducks with three minutes left in game seven. With the win the Red Wings moved on to face the Chicago Blackhawks in the Western Conference Final. Cleary scored five goals against his former team in a 4–1 series win clinching the Western Conference title before succumbing to the Pittsburgh Penguins in seven games in a rematch of the previous Stanley Cup Finals.

In 2009, Cleary founded the Danny Cleary Hockey School in his native province of Newfoundland. The hockey school achieved notoriety after Henrik Zetterberg appeared wearing a hat donning the Danny Cleary Hockey School logo.

On September 12, 2013, the Detroit Red Wings re-signed Cleary to a one-year, $1.75 million contract. On July 10, 2014, the Detroit Red Wings re-signed Cleary to a one-year, $1.5 million contract, with up to $1 million in performance-based bonuses.

During the 2014–15 season, Cleary appeared in 17 games for the Red Wings, where he recorded one goal and one assist. On September 4, 2015, the Detroit Red Wings re-signed Cleary to a one-year, $950,000 contract.

On September 23, 2016, Cleary signed a one-year contract with the Grand Rapids Griffins of the American Hockey League (AHL). During the 2016–17 season, Cleary did not feature in a game for the Griffins instead serving as an unofficial player/coach role in mentoring the younger players within the Red Wings organization. Cleary announced his retirement from playing after the Griffins captured the Calder Cup on June 13, 2017.

== International play ==
Cleary's first experience representing Canada internationally was when he played at the 1995 U18 Tournament, scoring four goals and four assists over five games. Cleary later played for Canadian national team at the 2002 IIHF World Championship, scoring two goals and three points in a disappointing sixth-place finish, which was Canada's fifth straight World Championship without a gold medal.

== Career statistics ==
=== Regular season and playoffs ===
			Regular season					Playoffs
Season	Team	League	GP	G	A	Pts	PIM	GP	G	A	Pts	PIM
1993–94	Kingston Voyageurs	MetJHL	41	18	28	46	33	2	0	1	1	0
1994–95	Belleville Bulls	OHL	62	26	55	81	62	16	7	10	17	23
1995–96	Belleville Bulls	OHL	64	53	62	115	74	14	10	17	27	40
1996–97	Belleville Bulls	OHL	64	32	48	80	88	6	3	4	7	6
1997–98	Chicago Blackhawks	NHL	6	0	0	0	0	—	—	—	—	—
1997–98	Indianapolis Ice	IHL	4	2	1	3	6	—	—	—	—	—
1997–98	Belleville Bulls	OHL	30	16	31	47	14	10	6	17	23	10
1998–99	Chicago Blackhawks	NHL	35	4	5	9	24	—	—	—	—	—
1998–99	Portland Pirates	AHL	30	9	17	26	74	—	—	—	—	—
1998–99	Hamilton Bulldogs	AHL	9	0	1	1	7	3	0	0	0	0
1999–2000	Edmonton Oilers	NHL	17	3	2	5	8	4	0	1	1	2
1999–2000	Hamilton Bulldogs	AHL	56	22	52	74	108	5	2	3	5	18
2000–01	Edmonton Oilers	NHL	81	14	21	35	37	6	1	1	2	8
2001–02	Edmonton Oilers	NHL	65	10	19	29	51	—	—	—	—	—
2002–03	Edmonton Oilers	NHL	57	4	13	17	31	—	—	—	—	—
2003–04	Phoenix Coyotes	NHL	68	6	11	17	42	—	—	—	—	—
2004–05	Mora IK	SEL	47	11	26	37	136	—	—	—	—	—
2005–06	Detroit Red Wings	NHL	77	3	12	15	40	6	0	1	1	6
2006–07	Detroit Red Wings	NHL	71	20	20	40	24	18	4	8	12	30
2007–08	Detroit Red Wings	NHL	63	20	22	42	33	22	2	1	3	4
2008–09	Detroit Red Wings	NHL	74	14	26	40	46	23	9	6	15	12
2009–10	Detroit Red Wings	NHL	64	15	19	34	29	12	2	0	2	4
2010–11	Detroit Red Wings	NHL	68	26	20	46	20	11	2	4	6	6
2011–12	Detroit Red Wings	NHL	75	12	21	33	30	5	0	0	0	2
2012–13	Detroit Red Wings	NHL	48	9	6	15	40	14	4	6	10	2
2013–14	Detroit Red Wings	NHL	52	4	4	8	31	—	—	—	—	—
2014–15	Detroit Red Wings	NHL	17	1	1	2	6	—	—	—	—	—
2015–16	Grand Rapids Griffins	AHL	35	3	12	15	8	9	0	0	0	6
NHL totals			938	165	222	387	492	121	24	28	52	76

=== International ===
Year	Team	Event	Result	GP	G	A	Pts	PIM
2002	Canada	WC	6th	7	2	1	3	2
Senior totals				7	2	1	3	2

== Awards and honours ==
Award	Year	Ref
OHL
First All-Rookie Team	1995	
CHL All-Rookie Team	1995	
First All-Star Team	1996, 1997	
CHL Second All-Star Team	1996	
AHL
All-Star Game	2000	
Second all-star team	2000	
Calder Cup	2017	
NHL
Stanley Cup champion	2008	

Awards and achievements
Preceded by Dmitri Nabokov	Chicago Blackhawks first-round draft pick 1997	Succeeded by Ty Jones
