= Tomáš Fleischmann =

Czech ice hockey player (born 1984)

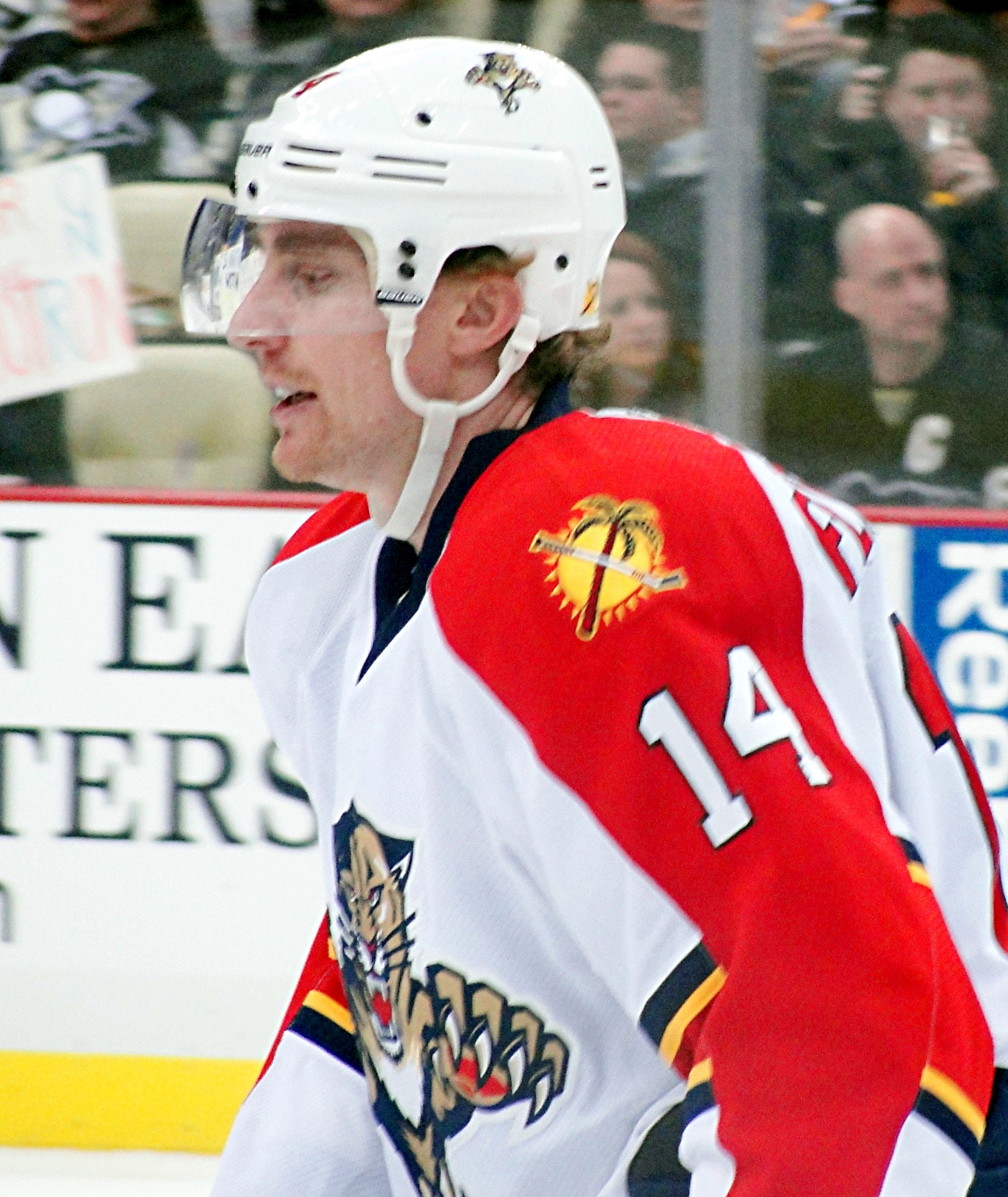
- Fleischmann with the Florida Panthers in 2012
- Born: May 16, 1984 (age 42) Kopřivnice, Czechoslovakia
- Height: 6 ft 1 in (185 cm)
- Weight: 192 lb (87 kg; 13 st 10 lb)
- Position: Left wing
- Shot: Left
- Played for: Washington Capitals; Colorado Avalanche; Florida Panthers; Anaheim Ducks; Montreal Canadiens; Chicago Blackhawks
- National team: Czech Republic
- NHL draft: 63rd overall, 2002; Detroit Red Wings
- Playing career: 2004–2016

Tomáš Fleischmann (born May 16, 1984) is a Czech former professional ice hockey winger. He most notably played in the National Hockey League (NHL) with several teams, including stints with the Washington Capitals and Florida Panthers.

== Playing career ==
Fleischmann originally played three years in his native Czech Republic as a junior with HC Vitkovic, playing at both the under-18 and under-20 levels. As a prolific scorer, Fleischmann experienced his first taste of professional hockey late in the 2002–03 season, appearing in eight games out on loan with third-division team HC Nový Jičín.

Fleischmann was subsequently drafted in the second round, 63rd overall, by the Detroit Red Wings in the 2002 NHL entry draft. With aspirations for an NHL career, Fleischmann immediately made the transition to North America by joining the Moose Jaw Warriors of the Western Hockey League (WHL) for the 2002–03 season. In his first season, Fleischmann emerged as a leader on the offence for the Warriors, finishing with 71 points in 65 games. Helping Moose Jaw reach the second round of the post-season, he led the team with 11 assists and 15 points in 12 games.

In the 2003–04 season, Fleischmann improved his offensive numbers with Moose Jaw to post 30 goals and 75 points in 60 games and earn selection to the WHL East Second All-Star Team. During the campaign, on February 27, 2004, Fleischmann's NHL rights were traded with draft picks by the Red Wings to the Washington Capitals in exchange for fellow countryman Robert Lang.

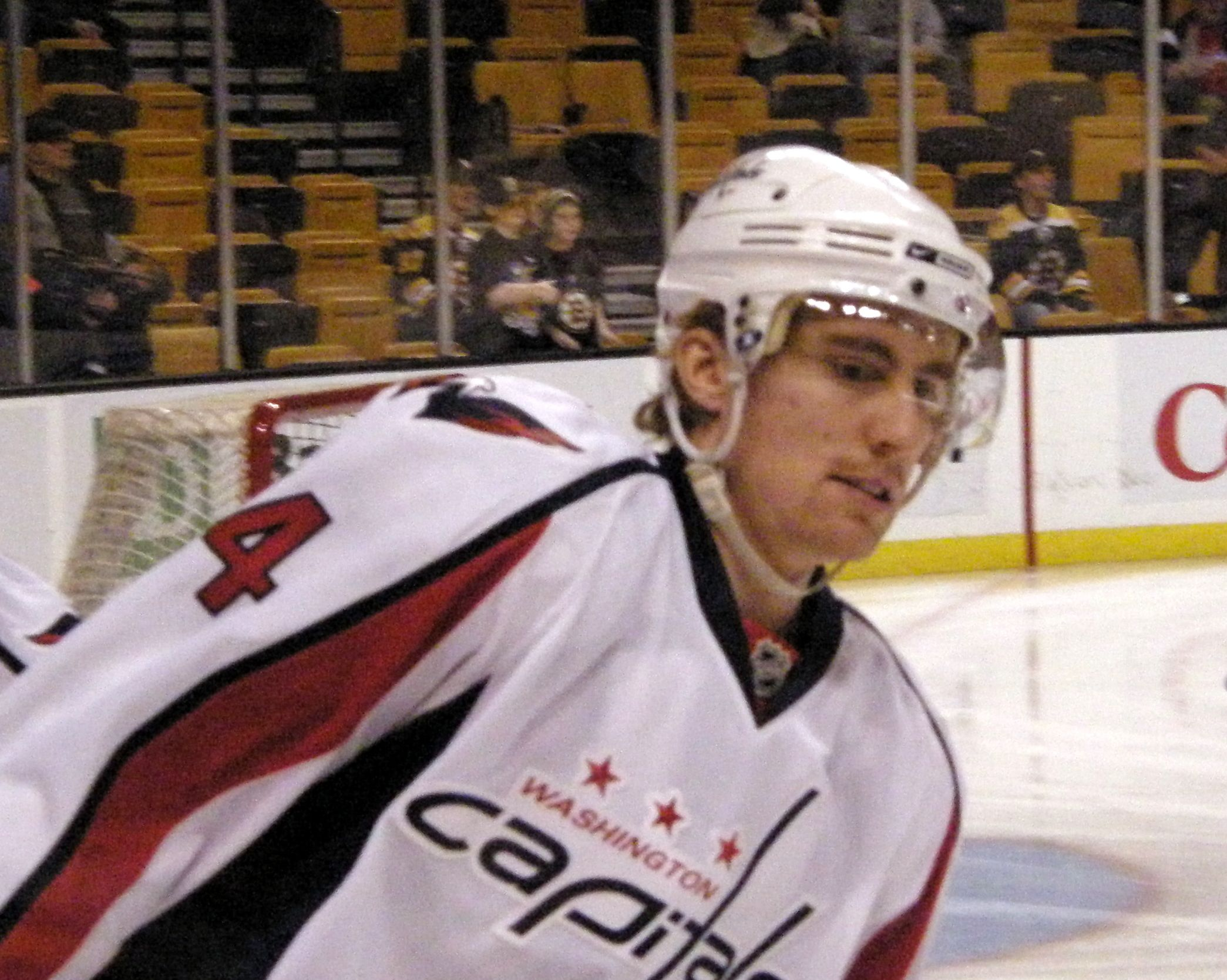
Fleischmann as a member of the Capitals.

On June 1, 2006, Fleischmann was signed by the Capitals to a three-year, entry-level contract. In his first full professional season, he was assigned to their American Hockey League (AHL) affiliate, the Portland Pirates, for the duration of the 2004–05 season and contributed within a limited role with a modest 19 points in 53 games.

In the following season, 2005–06, Fleischmann started the year in the AHL with the Capitals' new affiliate, the Hershey Bears. Scoring 13 points in his first 10 games of the year, he received his first recall to the Capitals on November 3, 2005. He then made his NHL debut the same day, appearing for Washington in an 8–1 defeat against the Philadelphia Flyers. In his third game with the Capitals, he collected his first NHL point, an assist on a goal to Brian Willsie, in a 5–4 victory over the Toronto Maple Leafs on November 6. Despite a near month-long stay, he was returned to Hershey and under the tutelage of Head Coach Bruce Boudreau, progressed to lead the team with 30 goals in just 57 games. In the Calder Cup playoffs, Fleischmann helped carry the Bears to the Championship, leading the League with 21 assists and the team with 32 points in 20 games.

Fleischmann failed to make the Capitals' opening night roster out of training camp for the 2006–07 season and scored 51 points in only 45 games in spending the majority of the first half of the campaign with the Bears. On February 24, 2007, Fleishmann scored his first NHL goal in a 4–2 victory against Martin Brodeur and the New Jersey Devils. He remained in Washington to play in the team's final 21 games and on March 18, 2007, he recorded the first multi-point game of his career, scoring the first two goals of the game and assisting in two others to be named second star of the game in a 7–1 rout of the Tampa Bay Lightning. In returning to the AHL to help the Bears defend the Calder Cup, Fleischmann again led the team in the playoff scoring with 21 points in 19 games. Although suffering defeat in the finals to the Hamilton Bulldogs, for the second consecutive post-season he led the AHL in assists, with 16.

Prior to the 2007–08 season, Fleischmann was re-signed by the Capitals to a one-year contract on October 1, 2007. Re-united with Bruce Boudreau early into his first full season in the NHL, he established a role as a skilled utility player within the Capitals and was re-signed to a two-year extension during the season on February 13, 2008. He finished to score 10 goals and 30 points in 75 games as the Capitals qualified for the Stanley Cup playoffs for the first time in four seasons. Fleischmann made his post-season debut against the opening game against Philadelphia Flyers on April 11, 2008, but played in only two games in the Capitals' eventual Game 7 defeat in the Quarter-finals to the Flyers.

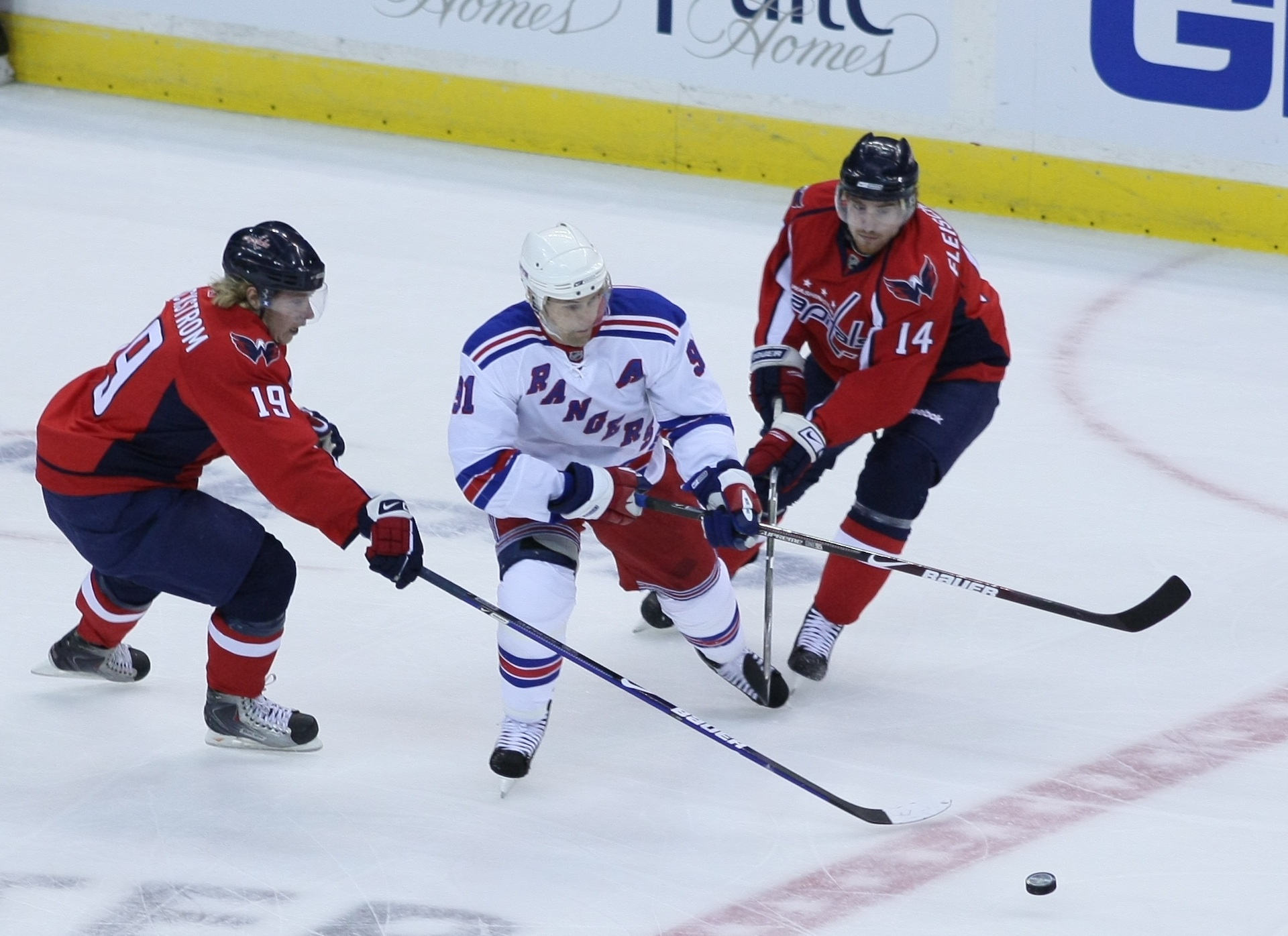
Fleischmann, on the right, skating against the New York Rangers in the 2009 Stanley Cup playoffs.

Fleischmann backed-up the play of his previous season, appearing in 73 games and improving to score 19 goals and 37 points for the Capitals in 2008–09. He scored his first playoff goal in the opening game of the Quarter-finals, a 4–3 defeat to the New York Rangers, on April 15, 2009. Appearing in all 14 playoff games for Washington, he recorded three goals and one assist.

After returning to the Czech Republic in the off-season, Fleischmann was found to have developed a blood clot in his leg due to deep vein thrombosis from the cross-Atlantic flight and would miss the pre-season and the start of the 2009–10 season. With an initial two-game stint with the Hershey Bears on a conditioning assignment, Fleischmann returned to the Capitals having missed the first 10 games. In a break-out season with the Presidents' Trophy-winning Capitals, Fleischmann posted a career-high 23 goals and 51 points in 69 games. Fleischmann, however, suffered a disappointing post-season, contributing only one assist in six games and was scratched for the deciding game of the series in a shock loss to the Montreal Canadiens.

On July 27, 2010, Fleischmann was re-signed as a restricted free agent to a one-year contract with the Capitals. Shifted to centre by Washington to start the 2010–11 season, Fleischmann failed to establish an offensive presence and was demoted as a depth player. On November 30, 2010, he was traded by the Capitals to the Colorado Avalanche in exchange for defenceman Scott Hannan. Returning to the left wing position, he made his Avalanche debut in a 2–1 overtime defeat to the Carolina Hurricanes on December 3, 2010. In his fourth game, his scored his first goal with Colorado in a 4–2 victory over the Atlanta Thrashers on December 10, 2010. Five days later, Fleischmann notched his first career NHL hat-trick in a 4–3 win over the Chicago Blackhawks. Fleischmann's torrid start with the Avalanche, scoring 21 points in 22 games, came to a sudden halt on January 20, when it was revealed that he was diagnosed with pulmonary emboli and would miss the remainder of the 2010–11 season.

Fleischmann signed a four-year contract worth $18 million with the Florida Panthers on July 1, 2011.

In the final year of his contract with the Panthers in the 2014–15 season, and with his offensive production having declined each season with Florida, Fleischmann was traded to the Anaheim Ducks in exchange for Dany Heatley and a 2015 third-round draft pick on February 28, 2015. Fleischmann played a complementary role within the Ducks organization, finishing the regular season with 6 points in 14 games. In the post-season, Fleischmann was relegated to a depth role and healthy scratch in appearing only 6 post-season games with the Conference finalist Ducks.

As an unsigned free agent in the offseason, on September 12, 2015, Fleischmann accepted an invitation to a professional tryout contract with the Montreal Canadiens. On October 4, 2015, the Canadiens signed Fleischmann to a one-year, $750,000 contract. In the 2015–16 season, Fleischmann contributed to the Canadiens' early unbeaten success, regaining his offensive presence while featuring on the third line. Fleischmann compiled 10 goals and 10 assists in 57 games with the Canadiens before he was traded to the Chicago Blackhawks along with teammate Dale Weise in exchange for a 2018 second-round draft pick and Phillip Danault.

In September 2016, Fleischmann was signed by the Minnesota Wild to a professional tryout contract. Unfortunately, on September 25, 2016, he was released from by the Wild after failing his physical. With his history of blood clots, the Wild did not disclose the injury out of respect for Fleischmann's privacy. Fleischmann later returned to the Florida area with his family and unofficially began his postplaying career by tentatively coaching at the Florida Panthers youth hockey clinics throughout the 2016–17 season.

== International play ==
Medal record

Representing Czech Republic

Ice hockey

IIHF U18 Championships
Bronze medal – third place	2002 Piešťany	

Fleischmann first represented the Czech Republic during his final junior year in the Czech Republic when he was named to the 2002 World Under 18 Championship squad. In eight games in Slovakia, Fleischmann scored one goal and two assists as the Czech Republic defeated Finland 4–2 to capture the bronze medal.

While with the Moose Jaw Warriors, Fleischmann earned consecutive selections in the Czech World Junior Championship squad's for 2003 and 2004 respective sixth and fourth-place finishes. In 13 combined games, Fleischmann posted four goals and two assists.

After completing his first professional season with the Capitals in 2007–08, Fleischmann was added to his first senior Czech squad at the 2008 World Championships in Quebec City, Quebec. Fleischmann scored his first senior goal in a 5–0 shutout round-robin win over Switzerland on May 8, 2008. He completed the tournament with five points in seven games as the Czechs finished in fifth place.

As a part of the Capitals' highest scoring team in 2009–10, Fleischmann was selected mid-season to the Czech team for the 2010 Winter Olympics on December 30, 2009. Fleischmann scored three points in five games for the Czech Republic en route to a disappointing seventh-place finish.

== Career statistics ==
=== Regular season and playoffs ===
			Regular season					Playoffs
Season	Team	League	GP	G	A	Pts	PIM	GP	G	A	Pts	PIM
2000–01	HC Vítkovice	CZE U20	21	4	9	13	8	—	—	—	—	—
2001–02	HC Vítkovice	CZE U20	44	25	25	50	16	2	1	0	1	0
2001–02	HC Nový Jičín	CZE.3	8	3	2	5	8	7	3	4	7	35
2002–03	Moose Jaw Warriors	WHL	65	21	50	71	36	12	4	11	15	6
2003–04	Moose Jaw Warriors	WHL	60	33	42	75	32	10	3	4	7	10
2004–05	Portland Pirates	AHL	53	7	12	19	14	—	—	—	—	—
2005–06	Hershey Bears	AHL	57	30	33	63	32	20	11	21	32	15
2005–06	Washington Capitals	NHL	14	0	2	2	0	—	—	—	—	—
2006–07	Hershey Bears	AHL	45	22	29	51	22	19	5	16	21	10
2006–07	Washington Capitals	NHL	29	4	4	8	8	—	—	—	—	—
2007–08	Washington Capitals	NHL	75	10	20	30	18	2	0	0	0	0
2008–09	Washington Capitals	NHL	73	19	18	37	20	14	3	1	4	4
2009–10	Hershey Bears	AHL	2	0	1	1	0	—	—	—	—	—
2009–10	Washington Capitals	NHL	69	23	28	51	28	6	0	1	1	6
2010–11	Washington Capitals	NHL	23	4	6	10	10	—	—	—	—	—
2010–11	Colorado Avalanche	NHL	22	8	13	21	8	—	—	—	—	—
2011–12	Florida Panthers	NHL	82	27	34	61	26	7	1	2	3	2
2012–13	Florida Panthers	NHL	48	12	23	35	16	—	—	—	—	—
2013–14	Florida Panthers	NHL	80	8	20	28	22	—	—	—	—	—
2014–15	Florida Panthers	NHL	52	7	14	21	8	—	—	—	—	—
2014–15	Anaheim Ducks	NHL	14	1	5	6	4	6	0	1	1	0
2015–16	Montreal Canadiens	NHL	57	10	10	20	28	—	—	—	—	—
2015–16	Chicago Blackhawks	NHL	19	4	1	5	4	4	0	0	0	0
NHL totals			657	137	198	335	200	39	4	5	9	12

=== International ===
Year	Team	Event	Result	GP	G	A	Pts	PIM
2002	Czech Republic	WJC18	3rd place, bronze medalist(s)	8	1	2	3	2
2003	Czech Republic	WJC	6th	6	2	0	2	0
2004	Czech Republic	WJC	4th	7	2	2	4	2
2008	Czech Republic	WC	5th	7	2	3	5	0
2010	Czech Republic	OG	7th	5	1	2	3	2
2013	Czech Republic	WC	7th	8	2	0	2	0
Junior totals				21	5	4	9	4
Senior totals				20	5	5	10	2

== Awards and honours ==
Award	Year
WHL
East Second All-Star Team	2003–04
AHL
Calder Cup Champion	2005–06
