= 2009 Stanley Cup playoffs =

Tournament details
- Dates: April 15–June 12, 2009
- Teams: 16
- Defending champions: Detroit Red Wings

Final positions
- Champions: Pittsburgh Penguins
- Runners-up: Detroit Red Wings

Tournament statistics
- Scoring leader(s): Evgeni Malkin (Penguins) (36 points)

Awards
- MVP: Evgeni Malkin (Penguins)

The 2009 Stanley Cup playoffs of the National Hockey League began on April 15, 2009, after the 2008–09 regular season. The sixteen teams that qualified, eight from each conference (the winner of each of the three divisions plus the five teams with highest point totals from the teams remaining), played a best-of-seven series for the conference quarterfinals, semifinals, and championships, and then the conference champions played a best-of-seven series for the Stanley Cup. The Columbus Blue Jackets made their first appearance in the playoffs in their nine-year history. Previously they had been the only franchise never to have made the playoffs. Also, home teams set a record by going 13–2 in the openers of all the series combined.

There were no playoff games played in the Province of Ontario as this was the first time that the modern Ottawa Senators and the Toronto Maple Leafs both missed the playoffs in the same year. This was the most recent time that the Carolina Hurricanes were in the playoffs until 2019.

The Stanley Cup Finals ended on June 12, 2009, with the Pittsburgh Penguins defeating the Detroit Red Wings four games to three to win their third Stanley Cup championship in franchise history. They became just the second team, after the 1970–71 Montreal Canadiens, to win the championship after losing the first two games of the series on the road.

== Playoff seeds ==
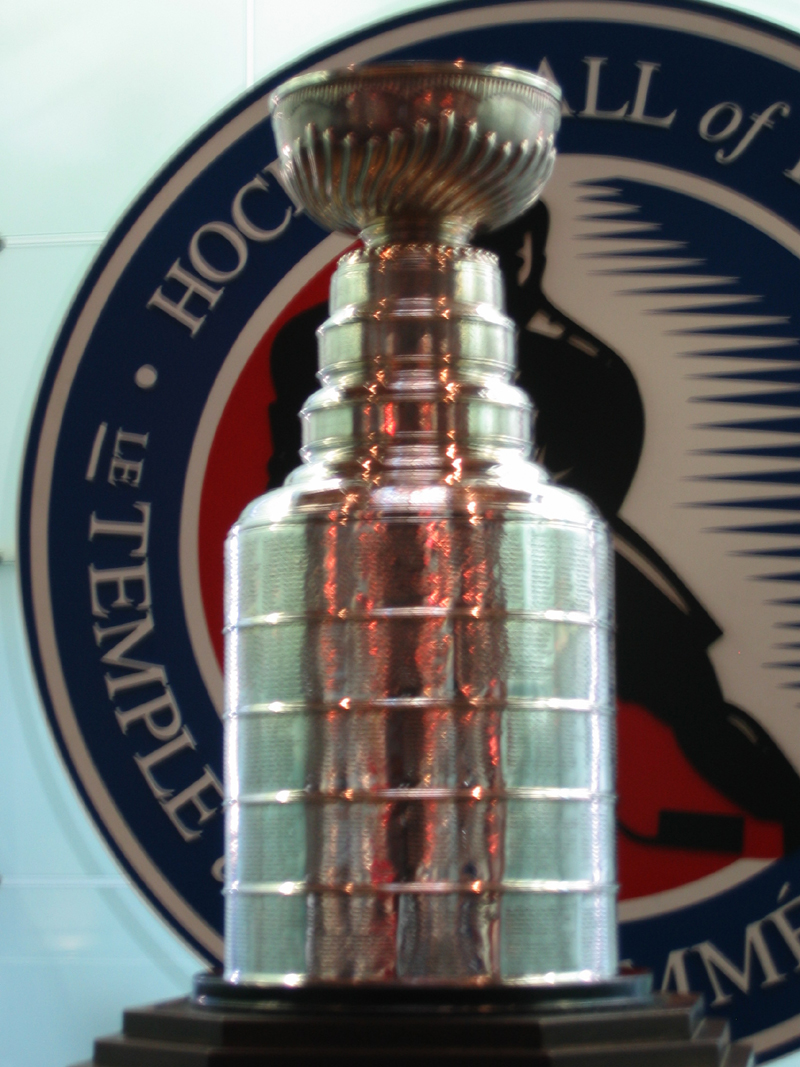
The Stanley Cup

The top eight teams in each conference qualified for the playoffs. The top three seeds in each conference were awarded to the division winners; while the five remaining spots were awarded to the highest finishers in their respective conferences.

The following teams qualified for the playoffs:

=== Eastern Conference ===
1. Boston Bruins, Northeast Division champions, Eastern Conference regular season champions – 116 points
2. Washington Capitals, Southeast Division champions – 108 points
3. New Jersey Devils, Atlantic Division champions – 106 points
4. Pittsburgh Penguins – 99 points (45 wins)
5. Philadelphia Flyers – 99 points (44 wins)
6. Carolina Hurricanes – 97 points
7. New York Rangers – 95 points
8. Montreal Canadiens – 93 points

=== Western Conference ===
1. San Jose Sharks, Pacific Division champions, Western Conference regular season champions, President's Trophy winners – 117 points
2. Detroit Red Wings, Central Division champions – 112 points
3. Vancouver Canucks, Northwest Division champions – 100 points
4. Chicago Blackhawks – 104 points
5. Calgary Flames – 98 points
6. St. Louis Blues – 92 points (41 wins, 8 points head-to-head vs. Columbus)
7. Columbus Blue Jackets – 92 points (41 wins, 2 points head-to-head vs. St. Louis)
8. Anaheim Ducks – 91 points

== Playoff bracket ==
In each round, teams competed in a best-of-seven series following a 2–2–1–1–1 format (scores in the bracket indicate the number of games won in each best-of-seven series). The team with home ice advantage played at home for games one and two (and games five and seven, if necessary), and the other team played at home for games three and four (and game six, if necessary). The top eight teams in each conference made the playoffs, with the three division winners seeded 1–3 based on regular season record, and the five remaining teams seeded 4–8.

The NHL used "re-seeding" instead of a fixed bracket playoff system. During the first three rounds, the highest remaining seed in each conference was matched against the lowest remaining seed, the second-highest remaining seed played the second-lowest remaining seed, and so forth. The higher-seeded team was awarded home ice advantage. The two conference winners then advanced to the Stanley Cup Finals, where home ice advantage was awarded to the team that had the better regular season record.

Conference quarterfinals	Conference semifinals
1	Boston	4
8	Montreal	0
1	Boston	3
6	Carolina	4
3	New Jersey	3
6	Carolina	4
Eastern Conference
2	Washington	4
7	NY Rangers	3
2	Washington	3
4	Pittsburgh	4
4	Pittsburgh	4
5	Philadelphia	2
1	San Jose	2
8	Anaheim	4
2	Detroit	4
8	Anaheim	3
2	Detroit	4
7	Columbus	0
Western Conference
3	Vancouver	4
6	St. Louis	0
3	Vancouver	2
4	Chicago	4
4	Chicago	4
5	Calgary	2

Conference finals
6	Carolina	0
4	Pittsburgh	4
2	Detroit	4
4	Chicago	1

Stanley Cup Finals
E4	Pittsburgh	4
W2	Detroit	3

== Conference quarterfinals ==
=== Eastern Conference quarterfinals ===
==== (1) Boston Bruins vs. (8) Montreal Canadiens ====
For an NHL-record 32nd time, the Bruins and Canadiens faced each other in the playoffs. The Boston Bruins entered the playoffs after finishing the regular season with the best record in the Eastern Conference with 116 points. The Montreal Canadiens qualified for the postseason as the eighth seed with 93 points, winning the tiebreaker over the Florida Panthers based on the season series (six points to three).

Boston swept Montreal, scoring at least four goals in each win. With the score tied 2–2 entering the third period of Game 1, Bruins captain Zdeno Chara scored a power play goal at 11:15 and Phil Kessel added an empty net score in the closing seconds to clinch the victory. Boston scored three power play goals, including two from Marc Savard, en route to a 5–1 victory in Game 2. Game 3 resembled the first game in that both teams fought to a 2–2 tie midway through the game, but like the first contest the Bruins scored the go-ahead winning goal again. This time it was Michael Ryder at 17:21 in the second period. Montreal scored in the first minute of Game 4 off the stick of Andrei Kostitsyn, but Boston went on to dominate the rest of the game, grabbing two goals from Ryder in a 4–1 victory, to win the series.

April 16	Montreal Canadiens	2–4	Boston Bruins	TD Banknorth Garden	Recap
Chris Higgins (1) – 16:19		First period	13:11 – Phil Kessel (1); 14:41 – David Krejci (1)
Alexei Kovalev (1) – 17:37		Second period	No scoring
No scoring		Third period	11:15 – pp – Zdeno Chara (1); 19:46 – en – Phil Kessel (2)
Carey Price 35 saves / 38 shots		Goalie stats	Tim Thomas 26 saves / 28 shots

April 18	Montreal Canadiens	1–5	Boston Bruins	TD Banknorth Garden	Recap
No scoring		First period	09:59 – pp – Marc Savard (1); 15:12 – Chuck Kobasew (1)
Alexei Kovalev (2) – 00:46		Second period	05:45 – Shane Hnidy (1); 08:13 – pp – Marc Savard (2); 19:57 – pp – Michael Ryder (1)
No scoring		Third period	No scoring
Carey Price 21 saves / 26 shots Jaroslav Halak 5 saves / 5 shots		Goalie stats	Tim Thomas 30 saves / 31 shots

April 20	Boston Bruins	4–2	Montreal Canadiens	Bell Centre	Recap
Phil Kessel (3) – 18:35		First period	11:52 – Chris Higgins (2)
Shawn Thornton (1) – 03:36; Michael Ryder (2) – 17:21		Second period	05:16 – Yannick Weber (1)
Chuck Kobasew (2) – en – 19:23		Third period	No scoring
Tim Thomas 23 saves / 25 shots		Goalie stats	Carey Price 26 saves / 29 shots

April 22	Boston Bruins	4–1	Montreal Canadiens	Bell Centre	Recap
Michael Ryder (3) – 17:27; David Krejci (2) – 19:25		First period	00:39 – Andrei Kostitsyn (1)
Phil Kessel (4) – 11:58; Michael Ryder (4) – 12:43		Second period	No scoring
No scoring		Third period	No scoring
Tim Thomas 26 saves / 27 shots		Goalie stats	Carey Price 26 saves / 30 shots

Boston won series 4–0

==== (2) Washington Capitals vs. (7) New York Rangers ====
The Washington Capitals entered the playoffs as the second seed in the Eastern Conference after winning the Southeast Division with 108 points. The New York Rangers earned the seventh seed with 95 points. The teams met in the playoffs four times previously, with each winning two series. They last met in the 1994 Eastern Conference semifinals, which the Rangers won in five games.

The Capitals overcame a 3-1 series deficit to defeat the Rangers in seven games. The Rangers won the first game by a 4–3 score, with Brandon Dubinsky scoring the game winner at 11:43 in the third period. Capitals head coach Bruce Boudreau benched starting goaltender Jose Theodore and replaced him with Semyon Varlamov for Game 2, after Theodore allowed four goals on just 21 shots. The goaltending change was not immediately effective as New York netminder Henrik Lundqvist stopped all 35 Washington shots to give the Rangers a 1–0 victory (with Ryan Callahan providing the only tally) in the following game. Varlamov responded in game three by stopping all 33 Ranger shots, and Alexander Semin scored two goals to lead the Capitals to a 4–0 victory. However, Lundqvist stopped 38 of 39 shots, including 10 of 11 from the stick of Alexander Ovechkin, to give the Rangers a 2–1 victory in Game 4. The Capitals limited the Rangers to just 20 shots to win 4–0 in Game 5. Fourth liner Matt Bradley scored two goals in the game and Lundquist was pulled after allowing four goals on 14 shots. Rangers head coach John Tortorella was suspended for Game 6 due to getting into an altercation with Capitals fans that saw him throw a water bottle at a heckler; Jim Schoenfeld (who ironically had once been suspended for a game during the Stanley Cup playoffs in 1988 due to an altercation) served as coach for Game 6. Washington erupted in Game 6 to score five goals, including powerplay markers from Mike Green and Ovechkin, for a 5–3 victory. After Game 6, the league suspended Capitals forward Donald Brashear for both a pre-game altercation with Rangers forward Colton Orr and what was ruled to be a late hit on Blair Betts, in which the Rangers center suffered an orbital eye socket fracture. Sergei Fedorov scored the game-winning goal 15:01 into the third period in Game 7 to give the Capitals a 2–1 victory and eliminate the Rangers for their first playoff series victory since reaching the Stanley Cup Finals in 1998.

April 15	New York Rangers	4–3	Washington Capitals	Verizon Center	Recap
No scoring		First period	No scoring
Scott Gomez (1) – 07:49; Nik Antropov (1) – pp – 16:49; Markus Naslund (1) – pp – 18:28		Second period	06:40 – pp – Tomas Fleischmann (1); 19:11 – Viktor Kozlov (1)
Brandon Dubinsky (1) – 11:43		Third period	01:42 – pp – Alexander Semin (1)
Henrik Lundqvist 32 saves / 35 shots		Goalie stats	Jose Theodore 17 saves / 21 shots

April 18	New York Rangers	1–0	Washington Capitals	Verizon Center	Recap
Ryan Callahan (1) – 07:44		First period	No scoring
No scoring		Second period	No scoring
No scoring		Third period	No scoring
Henrik Lundqvist 35 saves / 35 shots		Goalie stats	Semyon Varlamov 23 saves / 24 shots

April 20	Washington Capitals	4–0	New York Rangers	Madison Square Garden	Recap
Alexander Semin (2) – 06:57; Alexander Semin (3) – 11:36		First period	No scoring
Brooks Laich (1) – pp – 11:29		Second period	No scoring
Tom Poti (1) – pp – 18:35		Third period	No scoring
Semyon Varlamov 33 saves / 33 shots		Goalie stats	Henrik Lundqvist 36 saves / 40 shots

April 22	Washington Capitals	1–2	New York Rangers	Madison Square Garden	Recap
No scoring		First period	13:55 – Paul Mara (1)
No scoring		Second period	02:23 – Chris Drury (1)
Alexander Ovechkin (1) – 02:13		Third period	No scoring
Semyon Varlamov 19 saves / 21 shots		Goalie stats	Henrik Lundqvist 38 saves / 39 shots

April 24	New York Rangers	0–4	Washington Capitals	Verizon Center	Recap
No scoring		First period	04:58 – sh – Matt Bradley (1); 12:07 – Matt Bradley (2)
No scoring		Second period	04:57 – Alexander Semin (4); 19:31 – Alexander Ovechkin (2)
No scoring		Third period	No scoring
Henrik Lundqvist 10 saves / 14 shots Steve Valiquette 7 saves / 7 shots		Goalie stats	Semyon Varlamov 20 saves / 20 shots

April 26	Washington Capitals	5–3	New York Rangers	Madison Square Garden	Recap
Milan Jurcina (1) – 07:09; Mike Green (1) – pp – 13:58; Tom Poti (2) – 17:14		First period	08:15 – pp – Scott Gomez (2)
Viktor Kozlov (2) – 09:21; Alexander Ovechkin (3) – pp – 16:44		Second period	No scoring
No scoring		Third period	04:21 – pp – Ryan Callahan (2); 19:54 – Marc Staal (1)
Semyon Varlamov 29 saves / 32 shots		Goalie stats	Henrik Lundqvist 15 saves / 20 shots Steve Valiquette 2 saves / 2 shots

April 28	New York Rangers	1–2	Washington Capitals	Verizon Center	Recap
Nik Antropov (2) – 05:35		First period	15:34 – Alexander Semin (5)
No scoring		Second period	No scoring
No scoring		Third period	15:01 – Sergei Fedorov (1)
Henrik Lundqvist 22 saves / 24 shots		Goalie stats	Semyon Varlamov 14 saves / 15 shots

Washington won series 4–3

==== (3) New Jersey Devils vs. (6) Carolina Hurricanes ====
The New Jersey Devils entered the playoffs as the third seed in the Eastern Conference after winning the Atlantic Division with 106 points. The Carolina Hurricanes earned the sixth seed with 97 points. These teams met three times previously in the playoffs, with the Hurricanes winning two series. They last met in the 2006 Eastern Conference semifinals, with the Hurricanes winning in five games.

The Hurricanes defeated the Devils in seven games. New Jersey won the first game with goaltender Martin Brodeur stopping 18 of 19 shots and the Devils' top line playing phenomenally, with Zach Parise and Patrik Elias coming up with goals. . In game two, Tim Gleason scored 2:40 into overtime for his first goal of the season to give Carolina a 2–1 victory. The game was a goaltending battle that saw Brodeur and Cam Ward each stop over 30 shots Game 3 also went into overtime, but this time the Devils prevailed, 3–2, with Travis Zajac scoring at 4:48 into the extra period. It appeared that game four would also go into overtime, but it ended with an epic conclusion. Carolina led 3–0, but New Jersey rallied to tie the game in the third. Jussi Jokinen proved to be the hero, as he scored on a deflection with 0.2 seconds remaining in regulation to give the Hurricanes a 4–3 victory. This goal was the latest game winning regulation goal in Stanley Cup Playoff history. The next two games of the series were shutouts: Brodeur stopped 44 shots in a 1–0 victory for the Devils in game five (with David Clarkson providing the game's sole goal), while Cam Ward stopped 28 shots and Eric Staal scored twice in a 4–0 victory for Carolina in game six. The Hurricanes were behind for much of game seven but scored two goals inside the last 1:20 of the third period, one by Jokinen and the other by Staal, to win the contest 4–3 and eliminate the Devils.

April 15	Carolina Hurricanes	1–4	New Jersey Devils	Prudential Center	Recap
No scoring		First period	16:03 – Mike Mottau (1)
No scoring		Second period	00:59 – Zach Parise (1); 11:33 – Patrik Elias (1)
Ray Whitney (1) – 09:22		Third period	09:51 – Jamie Langenbrunner (1)
Cam Ward 35 saves / 39 shots		Goalie stats	Martin Brodeur 18 saves / 19 shots

April 17	Carolina Hurricanes	2–1	OT	New Jersey Devils	Prudential Center	Recap
Eric Staal (1) – 19:35		First period		10:44 – Zach Parise (2)
No scoring		Second period		No scoring
No scoring		Third period		No scoring
Tim Gleason (1) – 02:40		First overtime period		No scoring
Cam Ward 33 saves / 34 shots		Goalie stats		Martin Brodeur 30 saves / 32 shots

April 19	New Jersey Devils	3–2	OT	Carolina Hurricanes	RBC Center	Recap
Zach Parise (3) – 06:04; Brian Gionta (1) – 19:51		First period		06:35 – Ryan Bayda (1)
No scoring		Second period		15:30 – Chad LaRose (1)
No scoring		Third period		No scoring
Travis Zajac (1) – 04:58		First overtime period		No scoring
Martin Brodeur 28 saves / 30 shots		Goalie stats		Cam Ward 31 saves / 34 shots

April 21	New Jersey Devils	3–4	Carolina Hurricanes	RBC Center	Recap
No scoring		First period	07:44 – Eric Staal (2); 08:47 – Ryan Bayda (2)
Brian Gionta (2) – 19:32		Second period	06:30 – Chad LaRose (2)
Brendan Shanahan (1) – 04:21; David Clarkson (1) – 08:46		Third period	19:59 – Jussi Jokinen (1)
Martin Brodeur 42 saves / 46 shots		Goalie stats	Cam Ward 26 saves / 29 shots

April 23	Carolina Hurricanes	0–1	New Jersey Devils	Prudential Center	Recap
No scoring		First period	No scoring
No scoring		Second period	11:22 – pp – David Clarkson (2)
No scoring		Third period	No scoring
Cam Ward 41 saves / 42 shots		Goalie stats	Martin Brodeur 44 saves / 44 shots

April 26	New Jersey Devils	0–4	Carolina Hurricanes	RBC Center	Recap
No scoring		First period	10:32 – Ray Whitney (2)
No scoring		Second period	04:44 – Eric Staal (3); 07:30 – Eric Staal (4)
No scoring		Third period	09:12 – pp – Jussi Jokinen (2)
Martin Brodeur 33 saves / 37 shots		Goalie stats	Cam Ward 28 saves / 28 shots

April 28	Carolina Hurricanes	4–3	New Jersey Devils	Prudential Center	Recap
Tuomo Ruutu (1) – 01:02		First period	02:31 – Jamie Langenbrunner (2); 13:27 – Jay Pandolfo (1)
Ray Whitney (3) – 03:42		Second period	08:47 – pp – Brian Rolston (1)
Jussi Jokinen (3) – 18:40; Eric Staal (5) – 19:28		Third period	No scoring
Cam Ward 32 saves / 35 shots		Goalie stats	Martin Brodeur 27 saves / 31 shots

Carolina won series 4–3

==== (4) Pittsburgh Penguins vs. (5) Philadelphia Flyers ====
The Pittsburgh Penguins and Philadelphia Flyers qualified for the playoffs by finishing the regular season tied with 99 points, but the Penguins earned the fourth seed because they won the tiebreaker on total wins (45–44) while the Flyers got the fifth seed. The Penguins and Flyers had previously met in the previous season's Eastern Conference Final, with the Penguins winning in five games. It was the Penguins first win against the Flyers, having lost against them in three previous series (1989, 1997 and 2000).

The Penguins defeated the Flyers in six games. Sidney Crosby scored a power play goal early in the first period of game one, sparking the Penguins to a 4–1 win against an undisciplined Flyers team that took 12 penalties. In game two, Bill Guerin scored two goals including the game-winner during a five-on-three power play at 18:29 in overtime to give Pittsburgh a 3–2 victory. The Flyers bounced back in game three with a 6–3 victory that featured two goals by Simon Gagne. Pittsburgh goaltender Marc-Andre Fleury stopped 45 shots and helped kill off nine Philadelphia power plays, while Tyler Kennedy scored the game winner, to give Pittsburgh a 3–1 win in Game 4. Flyers goaltender Martin Biron stopped all 28 shots, and Philadelphia got scoring from unlikely sources such as Arron Asham, to give the Flyers a 3–0 victory in game five. Then in game six, Philadelphia jumped to a 3–0 lead in the second period and appeared to be on their way to force a game seven. However, a fight between Philadelphia's Daniel Carcillo and Pittsburgh's Max Talbot reenergized the Penguins, who erupted to score five unanswered goals, including two by Crosby, to win the game and the series.

April 15	Philadelphia Flyers	1–4	Pittsburgh Penguins	Mellon Arena	Recap
No scoring		First period	04:41 – pp – Sidney Crosby (1)
No scoring		Second period	01:39 – Tyler Kennedy (1)
Simon Gagne (1) – pp – 15:25		Third period	06:28 – Evgeni Malkin (1); 10:27 – Mark Eaton (1)
Martin Biron 29 saves / 33 shots		Goalie stats	Marc-Andre Fleury 26 saves / 27 shots

April 17	Philadelphia Flyers	2–3	OT	Pittsburgh Penguins	Mellon Arena	Recap
Scott Hartnell (1) – pp – 13:26		First period		No scoring
No scoring		Second period		16:38 – Bill Guerin (1)
Darroll Powe (1) – 02:09		Third period		16:23 – pp – Evgeni Malkin (2)
No scoring		First overtime period		18:29 – pp – Bill Guerin (2)
Martin Biron 46 saves / 49 shots		Goalie stats		Marc-Andre Fleury 38 saves / 40 shots

April 19	Pittsburgh Penguins	3–6	Philadelphia Flyers	Wachovia Center	Recap
Evgeni Malkin (3) – 19:48		First period	02:59 – Jeff Carter (1); 05:14 – pp – Mike Richards (1)
Rob Scuderi (1) – 00:13		Second period	04:32 – Claude Giroux (1); 08:58 – sh – Simon Gagne (2)
Evgeni Malkin (4) – pp – 08:30		Third period	03:42 – Jared Ross (1); 18:24 – en – Simon Gagne (3)
Marc-Andre Fleury 24 saves / 29 shots		Goalie stats	Martin Biron 26 saves / 29 shots

April 21	Pittsburgh Penguins	3–1	Philadelphia Flyers	Wachovia Center	Recap
No scoring		First period	No scoring
Sidney Crosby (2) – 03:19; Tyler Kennedy (2) – 07:41		Second period	No scoring
Maxime Talbot (1) – en – 19:08		Third period	11:44 – Daniel Carcillo (1)
Marc-Andre Fleury 45 saves / 46 shots		Goalie stats	Martin Biron 23 saves / 25 shots

April 23	Philadelphia Flyers	3–0	Pittsburgh Penguins	Mellon Arena	Recap
No scoring		First period	No scoring
Arron Asham (1) – 06:23		Second period	No scoring
Claude Giroux (2) – 03:25; Mike Knuble (1) – 13:13		Third period	No scoring
Martin Biron 28 saves / 28 shots		Goalie stats	Marc-Andre Fleury 23 saves / 26 shots

April 25	Pittsburgh Penguins	5–3	Philadelphia Flyers	Wachovia Center	Recap
No scoring		First period	17:48 – Mike Knuble (2); 18:39 – Joffrey Lupul (1)
Ruslan Fedotenko (1) – 04:35; Mark Eaton (2) – 06:32; Sidney Crosby (3) – 16:59		Second period	04:06 – pp – Daniel Briere (1)
Sergei Gonchar (1) – 02:19; Sidney Crosby (4) – en – 19:32		Third period	No scoring
Marc-Andre Fleury 22 saves / 25 shots		Goalie stats	Martin Biron 30 saves / 34 shots

Pittsburgh won series 4–2

=== Western Conference quarterfinals ===
==== (1) San Jose Sharks vs. (8) Anaheim Ducks ====
The series between the Sharks and Ducks was just the second time in NHL history that two California teams were facing each other in the playoffs. The first series was in 1969 between the Los Angeles Kings and the Oakland Seals. The San Jose Sharks entered the playoffs as the Presidents' Trophy winner, earning the NHL's best regular season record with 117 points. The Anaheim Ducks earned 91 points to clinch the eighth playoff seed in the Western Conference.

The Ducks defeated the Sharks in six games, to become just the second California team (after the 2000 Sharks over the St. Louis Blues) to eliminate a Presidents' Trophy winner in the first round of the playoffs. Anaheim goaltender Jonas Hiller earned two shutout victories in games one and four, stopping a total of 66 shots. Game one was deadlocked until a Scott Niedermayer powerplay goal broke the ice at 5:18 in the third, while game four was dominated by Anaheim and featured two goals from Bobby Ryan Hiller also stopped 42 out of 44 shots in game two, as Drew Miller picked up the game winner, and 36 out of 37 shots in a game six that saw the Ducks produce powerplay goals from Corey Perry and Teemu Selanne. In total, Hiller allowed only ten goals in the series. For the Sharks, Dan Boyle scored two goals in game three to give San Jose a 4–3 win in that contest, while Patrick Marleau scored the game-winning goal in game five to give the Sharks a 3–2 overtime victory. However, back in Anaheim for game six, the Ducks grabbed goals from big-name players like Selanne and Perry, dominating the Sharks to win the game 4–1, and eliminating the Sharks.

April 16	Anaheim Ducks	2–0	San Jose Sharks	HP Pavilion	Recap
No scoring		First period	No scoring
No scoring		Second period	No scoring
Scott Niedermayer (1) – pp – 05:18; Ryan Getzlaf (1) – 17:35		Third period	No scoring
Jonas Hiller 35 saves / 35 shots		Goalie stats	Evgeni Nabokov 15 saves / 17 shots

April 19	Anaheim Ducks	3–2	San Jose Sharks	HP Pavilion	Recap
Bobby Ryan (1) – pp – 03:45		First period	No scoring
No scoring		Second period	05:38 – Ryan Clowe (1)
Andrew Ebbett (1) – 09:44; Drew Miller (1) – 13:17		Third period	15:54 – Jonathan Cheechoo (1)
Jonas Hiller 42 saves / 44 shots		Goalie stats	Evgeni Nabokov 23 saves / 26 shots

April 21	San Jose Sharks	4–3	Anaheim Ducks	Honda Center	Recap
Rob Blake (1) – 05:34; Dan Boyle (1) – pp – 13:07		First period	11:12 – pp – Bobby Ryan (2); 14:50 – James Wisniewski (1)
Dan Boyle (2) – 01:05		Second period	11:50 – Chris Pronger (1)
Patrick Marleau (1) – pp – 10:33		Third period	No scoring
Evgeni Nabokov 27 saves / 30 shots		Goalie stats	Jonas Hiller 31 saves / 35 shots

April 23	San Jose Sharks	0–4	Anaheim Ducks	Honda Center	Recap
No scoring		First period	No scoring
No scoring		Second period	06:33 – Bobby Ryan (3); 10:13 – Bobby Ryan (4)
No scoring		Third period	14:09 – Corey Perry (1); 19:19 – en – Drew Miller (2)
Evgeni Nabokov 22 saves / 25 shots		Goalie stats	Jonas Hiller 31 saves / 31 shots

April 25	Anaheim Ducks	2–3	OT	San Jose Sharks	HP Pavilion	Recap
No scoring		First period		07:25 – pp – Joe Thornton (1)
No scoring		Second period		17:16 – Devin Setoguchi (1)
Ryan Carter (1) – 00:55; Corey Perry (2) – 04:42		Third period		No scoring
No scoring		First overtime period		06:02 – Patrick Marleau (2)
Jonas Hiller 45 saves / 48 shots		Goalie stats		Evgeni Nabokov 23 saves / 25 shots

April 27	San Jose Sharks	1–4	Anaheim Ducks	Honda Center	Recap
Milan Michalek (1) – pp – 10:19		First period	12:33 – pp – Corey Perry (3)
No scoring		Second period	13:03 - pp - Teemu Selanne (1); 14:26 - Francois Beauchemin (1)
No scoring		Third period	17:06 – Ryan Getzlaf (2)
Evgeni Nabokov 28 saves / 32 shots		Goalie stats	Jonas Hiller 36 saves / 37 shots

Anaheim won series 4–2

==== (2) Detroit Red Wings vs. (7) Columbus Blue Jackets ====
The Detroit Red Wings, the defending Stanley Cup Champions, entered the playoffs as the second overall seed in the Western Conference, having clinched the Central Division title with 112 points. The Columbus Blue Jackets qualified for the playoffs for the first time in franchise history, clinching the seventh seed with 92 points but lost the head-to-head tiebreaker with the St. Louis Blues. This was the first Western Conference playoff series played entirely within the Eastern Time Zone since the Red Wings played the Toronto Maple Leafs in the 1993 Norris Division semifinals, and this proved to be the last ever occurrence, as both of these teams were realigned into the Eastern Conference prior to the start of the 2013–14 season.

The Red Wings swept the Blue Jackets in four games. Detroit scored four goals in each of the first three games of the series, while goaltender Chris Osgood only allowed two total goals out of 78 Columbus shots in those three games, including a shutout victory in game two. Jiri Hudler broke the ice at 10:48 in the second period for the game one win. Detroit picked up powerplay goals from Brian Rafalski, Niklas Kronwall, and Hudler in game two. Henrik Zetterberg scored twice in a game three victory

The fourth game proved to be the most competitive contest of the series. Nicklas Lidstrom scored a power play goal early in the first period to give the Red Wings the lead before Kristian Huselius tied the score about three minutes later on a power play goal of his own. Tomas Holmstrom and Dan Cleary then scored to give Detroit a 3–1 lead before the end of the opening period. Columbus fought to tie the score again at 5:38 of the second period with goals by Rick Nash and R. J. Umberger, but the Red Wings Marian Hossa answered with two consecutive goals to give his team a two-goal lead again. The Blue Jackets then rallied to tie the score, 5–5, by the closing minutes of the second period with scores by Kris Russell and Fredrik Modin. The third period remained scoreless until the closing minutes of regulation. With less than two minutes left, the Blue Jackets were called for too many men on the ice, which enabled Johan Franzen to score the series winning power play goal with 46.6 seconds remaining.

April 16	Columbus Blue Jackets	1–4	Detroit Red Wings	Joe Louis Arena	Recap
No scoring		First period	No scoring
R. J. Umberger (1) – 11:40		Second period	10:48 – Jiri Hudler (1); 14:21 – Jonathan Ericsson (1); 15:09 – pp – Niklas Kronwall (1)
No scoring		Third period	02:54 – Johan Franzen (1)
Steve Mason 30 saves / 34 shots		Goalie stats	Chris Osgood 20 saves / 21 shots

April 18	Columbus Blue Jackets	0–4	Detroit Red Wings	Joe Louis Arena	Recap
No scoring		First period	13:13 – pp – Brian Rafalski (1)
No scoring		Second period	07:18 – pp – Pavel Datsyuk (1); 15:30 – Henrik Zetterberg (1)
No scoring		Third period	03:38 – pp – Jiri Hudler (2)
Steve Mason 35 saves / 39 shots		Goalie stats	Chris Osgood 25 saves / 25 shots

April 21	Detroit Red Wings	4–1	Columbus Blue Jackets	Nationwide Arena	Recap
Tomas Holmstrom (1) – 01:07; Daniel Cleary (1) – 19:14		First period	No scoring
Henrik Zetterberg (2) – 13:55		Second period	No scoring
Henrik Zetterberg 3 – en – 19:29		Third period	16:07 – pp – R. J. Umberger (2)
Chris Osgood 31 saves / 32 shots		Goalie stats	Steve Mason 22 saves / 25 shots

April 23	Detroit Red Wings	6–5	Columbus Blue Jackets	Nationwide Arena	Recap
Nicklas Lidstrom (1) – pp – 02:58; Tomas Holmstrom (2) – 07:09; Daniel Cleary (2) – 10:02		First period	06:12 – pp – Kristian Huselius (1)
Marian Hossa (1) – 06:59; Marian Hossa (2) – pp – 11:26		Second period	01:44 – Rick Nash (1); 05:38 – pp – R. J. Umberger (3); 15:45 – Kris Russell (1); 18:04 – Fredrik Modin (1)
Johan Franzen (2) – pp – 19:13		Third period	No scoring
Chris Osgood 27 saves / 32 shots		Goalie stats	Steve Mason 35 saves / 41 shots

Detroit won series 4–0

==== (3) Vancouver Canucks vs. (6) St. Louis Blues ====
The Vancouver Canucks entered the playoffs as the third overall seed in the Western Conference, having clinched the Northwest Division title with 100 points. The St. Louis Blues qualified for the playoffs for the first time since 2004, clinching the sixth seed with 92 points and winning the head-to-head tiebreaker over the Columbus Blue Jackets. This was the third meeting in the playoffs for these two teams, the Canucks winning both previous series. They last met in the 2003 Western Conference quarterfinals, with the Canucks winning in seven games.

Vancouver swept St. Louis in four games, their first sweep of a best-of-seven series in franchise history, to move on to the second round. The Canucks held off the Blues in game one, winning 2–1 by gaining goals from Daniel Sedin and Sami Salo and killing off a long Blues five-on-three power play midway through the first period. Vancouver then shut out St. Louis in game two, 3–0, with goaltender Roberto Luongo stopping all 30 Blues shots and Mats Sundin providing the game-winning goal. The Blues were hoping to gain momentum when the series shifted to St. Louis for game three, but Vancouver held on to a 3–2 win, scoring three power play goals, with Mattias Ohlund, Sedin, and Steve Bernier providing the man-advantage tallies. In game four, Brad Boyes and David Perron helped St. Louis to tie the game after falling behind early. However, Alex Burrows scored with 18.9 seconds left in the first overtime period to give the Canucks a 3–2 victory and the four-game sweep.

April 15	St. Louis Blues	1–2	Vancouver Canucks	General Motors Place	Recap
No scoring		First period	10:03 – Daniel Sedin (1)
Brad Boyes (1) – pp – 18:16		Second period	05:11 – pp – Sami Salo (1)
No scoring		Third period	No scoring
Chris Mason 29 saves / 31 shots		Goalie stats	Roberto Luongo 25 saves / 26 shots

April 17	St. Louis Blues	0–3	Vancouver Canucks	General Motors Place	Recap
No scoring		First period	18:04 – Mats Sundin (1)
No scoring		Second period	No scoring
No scoring		Third period	09:46 – Alex Burrows (1); 18:36 – en – Henrik Sedin (1)
Chris Mason 24 saves / 26 shots		Goalie stats	Roberto Luongo 30 saves / 30 shots

April 19	Vancouver Canucks	3–2	St. Louis Blues	Scottrade Center	Recap
No scoring		First period	03:11 – David Backes (1)
Mattias Ohlund (1) – pp – 07:57; Daniel Sedin (2) – pp – 10:18		Second period	16:13 – Andy McDonald (1)
Steve Bernier (1) – pp – 01:41		Third period	No scoring
Roberto Luongo 24 saves / 26 shots		Goalie stats	Chris Mason 23 saves / 26 shots

April 21	Vancouver Canucks	3–2	OT	St. Louis Blues	Scottrade Center	Recap
Kyle Wellwood (1) – 05:20		First period		No scoring
Alex Burrows (2) – 09:23		Second period		13:30 – Brad Boyes (2); 16:54 – David Perron (1)
No scoring		Third period		No scoring
Alex Burrows (3) – 19:41		First overtime period		No scoring
Roberto Luongo 47 saves / 49 shots		Goalie stats		Chris Mason 33 saves / 36 shots

Vancouver won series 4–0

==== (4) Chicago Blackhawks vs. (5) Calgary Flames ====
The Chicago Blackhawks finished the regular season in second place in the Central division with 104 points and thus entered the playoffs as the fourth-overall seed in the Western Conference. The Calgary Flames earned 98 points during the regular season to finish fifth-overall in the Western Conference. Chicago made the playoffs for the first time since 2002. The two teams met in the playoffs three times previously, with the Flames winning two series. They last met in the 1996 Western Conference quarterfinals, with the Blackhawks winning in four games.

Chicago won the series over Calgary in six games, with the home team winning the first five games of the series. Martin Havlat scored the game-winning goal 12 seconds into overtime to win game one for the Blackhawks, 3–2. Then in game two, Chicago overcame a 2-goal deficit by scoring 3 goals in the second period, including a pair from Jonathan Toews, to win 3–2. When the series shifted to Calgary for game three, David Moss scored two goals to help the Flames earn a 4–2 victory. In game four, Calgary scored six goals, including two by each of their top stars Jarome Iginla and Olli Jokinen, to win 6–4. The Blackhawks responded in game five by exploding to a 5–1 victory, going up 3–0 after one period with goals from Brent Seabrook, Patrick Sharp, and Kris Versteeg, and limiting the Flames to 20 shots on goal. Chicago defeated Calgary by a score of 4–1 in game six to win the series, with Patrick Kane providing the early game winner and goaltender Nikolai Khabibulin stopping 43 out of 44 shots.

April 16	Calgary Flames	2–3	OT	Chicago Blackhawks	United Center	Recap
David Moss (1) – 08:38		First period		No scoring
No scoring		Second period		13:17 – Cam Barker (1)
Michael Cammalleri (1) – 03:54		Third period		14:27 – Martin Havlat (1)
No scoring		First overtime period		00:12 – Martin Havlat (2)
Miikka Kiprusoff 25 saves / 28 shots		Goalie stats		Nikolai Khabibulin 23 saves / 25 shots

April 18	Calgary Flames	2–3	Chicago Blackhawks	United Center	Recap
Jarome Iginla (1) – pp – 07:44; Adrian Aucoin (1) – 16:15		First period	No scoring
No scoring		Second period	00:46 – pp – Jonathan Toews (1); 13:58 – Patrick Sharp (1); 19:36 – Jonathan Toews (2)
No scoring		Third period	No scoring
Miikka Kiprusoff 30 saves / 33 shots		Goalie stats	Nikolai Khabibulin 30 saves / 32 shots

April 20	Chicago Blackhawks	2–4	Calgary Flames	Pengrowth Saddledome	Recap
Patrick Sharp (2) – pp – 02:03		First period	06:40 – Eric Nystrom (1)
No scoring		Second period	17:07 – Rene Bourque (1)
Martin Havlat (3) – 15:35		Third period	01:18 – David Moss (2); 05:24 – David Moss (3)
Nikolai Khabibulin 24 saves / 28 shots		Goalie stats	Miikka Kiprusoff 36 saves / 38 shots

April 22	Chicago Blackhawks	4–6	Calgary Flames	Pengrowth Saddledome	Recap
Patrick Kane (1) – 04:40		First period	05:47 – pp – Jarome Iginla (2)
Kris Versteeg (1) – pp – 12:13; Cam Barker (2) – 16:44; Samuel Pahlsson (1) – pp – 19:27		Second period	00:50 – Olli Jokinen (1); 08:10 – Adrian Aucoin (2); 09:16 – Olli Jokinen (2)
No scoring		Third period	13:04 – Eric Nystrom (2); 19:49 – en – Jarome Iginla (3)
Nikolai Khabibulin 21 saves / 26 shots		Goalie stats	Miikka Kiprusoff 28 saves / 32 shots

April 25	Calgary Flames	1–5	Chicago Blackhawks	United Center	Recap
No scoring		First period	09:19 – pp – Brent Seabrook (1); 10:49 – Patrick Sharp (3); 11:08 – Kris Versteeg (2)
Dustin Boyd (1) – 02:45		Second period	06:14 – Andrew Ladd (1); 14:56 – Cam Barker (3)
No scoring		Third period	No scoring
Miikka Kiprusoff 14 saves / 18 shots Curtis McElhinney 9 saves / 10 shots		Goalie stats	Nikolai Khabibulin 19 saves / 20 shots

April 27	Chicago Blackhawks	4–1	Calgary Flames	Pengrowth Saddledome	Recap
Patrick Kane (2) – pp – 02:20; Adam Burish (1) – 10:11		First period	No scoring
Brian Campbell (1) – pp – 14:57		Second period	No scoring
Dustin Byfuglien (1) – en – 19:55		Third period	00:54 – Todd Bertuzzi (1)
Nikolai Khabibulin 43 saves / 44 shots		Goalie stats	Miikka Kiprusoff 12 saves / 15 shots

Chicago won series 4–2

== Conference semifinals ==
For the first time since the 2001 playoffs, at least three Conference Semifinal series extended to seven games.

=== Eastern Conference semifinals ===
==== (1) Boston Bruins vs. (6) Carolina Hurricanes ====
This was the fourth playoff meeting between these two teams, with the Bruins winning all three previous series. They last met in the 1999 Eastern Conference quarterfinals, which Boston won in six games. The Carolina Hurricanes eliminated the Boston Bruins in seven games to advance to their first Eastern Conference Final since their Stanley Cup championship season in 2006. Marc Savard scored two goals to help give the Bruins a 4–1 victory in game one, but the Hurricanes won the next three games of the series. First, Carolina goaltender Cam Ward stopped all 36 shots and Matt Cullen provided a shorthanded marker in a 3–0 victory in game two. Next, Jussi Jokinen scored at 2:48 into overtime of game three to give the Hurricanes a 3–2 victory. In game four, Eric Staal scored two goals and Ward stopped 18 out of only 19 shots en route to a 4–1 victory. However, Phil Kessel scored two goals and goaltender Tim Thomas stopped all 19 shots to give Boston a 4–0 victory in game five. Thomas then stopped 31 out of 33 shots and Mark Recchi, despite dealing with a kidney stone, provided an early game winner to help the Bruins win 4–2 in game six. The Hurricanes led game seven after two periods, but Milan Lucic tied the game at 6:19 in the third. However, Scott Walker scored the game-winning goal at 18:46 into the first overtime period to give the Hurricanes a 3–2 victory and the series.

May 1	Carolina Hurricanes	1–4	Boston Bruins	TD Banknorth Garden	Recap
Jussi Jokinen (4) – 18:50		First period	01:34 – Aaron Ward (1)
No scoring		Second period	07:21 – Marc Savard (3); 12:41 – Michael Ryder (5)
No scoring		Third period	07:21 – Marc Savard (4)
Cam Ward 20 saves / 24 shots		Goalie stats	Tim Thomas 26 saves / 27 shots

May 3	Carolina Hurricanes	3–0	Boston Bruins	TD Banknorth Garden	Recap
No scoring		First period	No scoring
Joe Corvo (1) – 02:30; Matt Cullen (1) – sh – 07:32		Second period	No scoring
Eric Staal (6) – en – 19:32		Third period	No scoring
Cam Ward 36 saves / 36 shots		Goalie stats	Tim Thomas 22 saves / 24 shots

May 6	Boston Bruins	2–3	OT	Carolina Hurricanes	RBC Center	Recap
Milan Lucic (1) - 08:43		First period		No scoring
No scoring		Second period		16:49 – pp – Eric Staal (7); 17:58 – Sergei Samsonov (1)
Mark Recchi (1) – 09:03		Third period		No scoring
No scoring		First overtime period		02:48 – Jussi Jokinen (5)
Tim Thomas 38 saves / 41 shots		Goalie stats		Cam Ward 21 saves / 23 shots

May 8	Boston Bruins	1–4	Carolina Hurricanes	RBC Center	Recap
No scoring		First period	04:54 – pp – Eric Staal (8)
Marc Savard (5) – pp – 02:37		Second period	No scoring
No scoring		Third period	02:42 – pp – Jussi Jokinen (6); 14:31 – Sergei Samsonov (2); 15:41 – Eric Staal (9)
Tim Thomas 27 saves / 31 shots		Goalie stats	Cam Ward 18 saves / 19 shots

May 10	Carolina Hurricanes	0–4	Boston Bruins	TD Banknorth Garden	Recap
No scoring		First period	14:48 – pp – Mark Recchi (2); 18:36 – Phil Kessel (5)
No scoring		Second period	04:40 – Phil Kessel (6)
No scoring		Third period	12:21 – Milan Lucic (2)
Cam Ward 36 saves / 40 shots		Goalie stats	Tim Thomas 19 saves / 19 shots

May 12	Boston Bruins	4–2	Carolina Hurricanes	RBC Center	Recap
Mark Recchi (3) – 02:01; Steve Montador (1) – 05:04		First period	No scoring
Marc Savard (6) – 08:53; Chuck Kobasew (3) – 18:03		Second period	02:49 – Matt Cullen (2)
No scoring		Third period	07:20 – Sergei Samsonov (3)
Tim Thomas 31 saves / 33 shots		Goalie stats	Cam Ward 15 saves / 19 shots

May 14	Carolina Hurricanes	3–2	OT	Boston Bruins	TD Banknorth Garden	Recap
Rod Brind'Amour (1) – 13:59		First period		07:42 – Byron Bitz (1)
Sergei Samsonov (4) – 07:45		Second period		No scoring
No scoring		Third period		06:19 – Milan Lucic (3)
Scott Walker (1) – 18:46		First overtime period		No scoring
Cam Ward 34 saves / 36 shots		Goalie stats		Tim Thomas 34 saves / 37 shots

Carolina won series 4–3

==== (2) Washington Capitals vs. (4) Pittsburgh Penguins ====
This was the eighth playoff meeting between these two teams, with the Penguins winning six of the previous seven series. They last met in the 2001 Eastern Conference quarterfinals, with the Penguins winning in seven games. The Pittsburgh Penguins advanced to their second consecutive Eastern Conference Final after defeating the Washington Capitals, 6–2, in game seven of their Conference Semifinal series. The Capitals appeared to have control of the series after winning the first two games. In game one, Washington goaltender Semyon Varlamov came up with a career-high 34 saves and Tomas Fleischmann provided a decisive third period goal in a 3–2 victory. Then in game two, both the Penguins' Sidney Crosby and the Capitals' Alexander Ovechkin each earned hat tricks, but David Steckel's goal in the second period ultimately made the difference in Washington's 4–3 win. However, Pittsburgh went on to win three consecutive games. Late in the third period of game three, Evgeni Malkin appeared to have the game winning powerplay marker for the Penguins, but Nicklas Backstrom tied the game on a Washington powerplay at 18:10. Kris Letang's game-winning goal at 11:23 into overtime gave the Penguins a 3–2 win. Pittsburgh then erupted to score three goals in the first period of game four, coming from the sticks of Sergei Gonchar, Bill Guerin, and Ruslan Fedotenko, en route to a 5–3 victory. The Penguins also had another overtime victory in game five, with Evgeni Malkin scoring this time on a power play at 3:28 into the extra period for a 4–3 win. The Capitals rebounded in game six with an overtime victory of their own, as David Steckel scored at 6:22 into the extra period to give Washington a 5–4 win.

In the deciding seventh game of the series, Varlamov, who had posted a 2.21 GAA and two shutouts in the playoffs, was pulled in the second period as the Penguins took a 4–0 lead only 2:13 into the second period. At the time that Varlamov was replaced by Jose Theodore, Pittsburgh had outshot Washington 18–5. The Penguins won 6–2 in dominating fashion, picking up a pair of goals from Crosby, to close out the series.

Crosby finished the series with thirteen points—one fewer than Ovechkin's fourteen points, which was the highest single-series point total since the 1995 Stanley Cup playoffs.

May 2	Pittsburgh Penguins	2–3	Washington Capitals	Verizon Center	Recap
Sidney Crosby (5) – 04:09		First period	13:50 – Dave Steckel (1); 17:03 – pp – Alexander Ovechkin (4)
Mark Eaton (3) – 12:54		Second period	No scoring
No scoring		Third period	01:46 – Tomas Fleischmann (2)
Marc-Andre Fleury 23 saves / 26 shots		Goalie stats	Semyon Varlamov 34 saves / 36 shots

May 4	Pittsburgh Penguins	3–4	Washington Capitals	Verizon Center	Recap
Sidney Crosby (6) – pp – 06:38		First period	No scoring
Sidney Crosby (7) – 10:57		Second period	02:18 – Alexander Ovechkin (5); 15:49 – Dave Steckel (2)
Sidney Crosby (8) – pp – 19:29		Third period	12:53 – pp – Alexander Ovechkin (6); 15:22 – Alexander Ovechkin (7)
Marc-Andre Fleury 29 saves / 33 shots		Goalie stats	Semyon Varlamov 33 saves / 36 shots

May 6	Washington Capitals	2–3	OT	Pittsburgh Penguins	Mellon Arena	Recap
No scoring		First period		09:29 – Ruslan Fedotenko (2)
Alexander Ovechkin (8) – 01:23		Second period		No scoring
Nicklas Backstrom (1) – pp – 18:10		Third period		15:01 – pp – Evgeni Malkin (5)
No scoring		First overtime period		11:23 – Kris Letang (1)
Semyon Varlamov 39 saves / 42 shots		Goalie stats		Marc-Andre Fleury 21 saves / 23 shots

May 8	Washington Capitals	3–5	Pittsburgh Penguins	Mellon Arena	Recap
Nicklas Backstrom (2) – 00:36		First period	03:55 – pp – Sergei Gonchar (2); 10:47 – Bill Guerin (3); 15:25 – Ruslan Fedotenko (3)
Chris Clark (1) – 15:08		Second period	No scoring
Milan Jurcina (2) – sh – 06:23		Third period	04:16 – Sidney Crosby (9); 14:46 – Maxime Talbot (2)
Semyon Varlamov 23 saves / 28 shots		Goalie stats	Marc-Andre Fleury 19 saves / 22 shots

May 9	Pittsburgh Penguins	4–3	OT	Washington Capitals	Verizon Center	Recap
No scoring		First period		No scoring
Jordan Staal (1) – 05:17		Second period		06:16 – Alexander Ovechkin (9); 14:35 – pp – Nicklas Backstrom (3)
Ruslan Fedotenko (4) – 00:51; Matt Cooke (1) – 06:27		Third period		15:52 – Alexander Ovechkin (10)
Evgeni Malkin (6) – pp – 03:28		First overtime period		No scoring
Marc-Andre Fleury 28 saves / 31 shots		Goalie stats		Semyon Varlamov 38 saves / 42 shots

May 11	Washington Capitals	5–4	OT	Pittsburgh Penguins	Mellon Arena	Recap
No scoring		First period		05:55 – Bill Guerin (4)
Viktor Kozlov (3) – 06:27; Tomas Fleischmann (3) – 14:42		Second period		19:26 – Mark Eaton (4)
Alexander Semin (6) – pp – 05:38; Viktor Kozlov (4) – 06:07		Third period		04:40 – pp – Kris Letang (2); 15:42 – Sidney Crosby (10)
Dave Steckel (3) – 06:22		First overtime period		No scoring
Semyon Varlamov 38 saves / 42 shots		Goalie stats		Marc-Andre Fleury 19 saves / 24 shots

May 13	Pittsburgh Penguins	6–2	Washington Capitals	Verizon Center	Recap
Sidney Crosby (11) – pp – 12:36; Craig Adams (1) – 12:44		First period	No scoring
Bill Guerin (5) – 00:28; Kris Letang (3) – 02:12; Jordan Staal (2) – 11:37		Second period	18:09 – Alexander Ovechkin (11)
Sidney Crosby (12) – 02:32		Third period	06:36 – Brooks Laich (2)
Marc-Andre Fleury 19 saves / 21 shots		Goalie stats	Semyon Varlamov 14 saves / 18 shots Jose Theodore 10 saves / 12 shots

Pittsburgh won series 4–3

=== Western Conference semifinals ===
==== (2) Detroit Red Wings vs. (8) Anaheim Ducks ====
The Detroit Red Wings advanced to their third consecutive Western Conference Final, and eighth since 1995, after eliminating the Anaheim Ducks in seven games. This Conference Semifinal match up featured the last two winners of the Stanley Cup, with Anaheim and Detroit winning the Cup in 2007 and 2008 respectively. This also marked the fifth series the two teams faced each other in since their first encounter in 1997. Both teams had won two series' each with the Wings winning in 1997 and 1999, and the Ducks winning in 2003 and 2007.

In game one, Nicklas Lidstrom scored two goals, including the game-winner with about 49 seconds left in regulation to break a 2–2 tie to give the Red Wings the victory. Anaheim's Todd Marchant scored at 1:15 into triple overtime of game two to give the Ducks a 4–3 victory, after goaltender Jonas Hiller stopped 59 Red Wing shots. Game three then ended in controversy: Anaheim was nursing a 2–1 lead with 1:04 remaining in the third period, aided by Hiller's eventual 45 saves and goals from Teemu Selanne and Scott Neidermayer. Detroit's Marian Hossa appeared to have scored the game-tying goal, but referee Brad Watson blew the play dead after losing sight of the puck and the Ducks held on to win the game. Despite the controversial call, the Red Wings bounced back to even the series in game four, with Hossa and Johan Franzen scoring two goals apiece en route to a 6–3 victory. Detroit then went on to win game five, 4–1, with Franzen and Jiri Hudler scoring just 39 seconds apart in the second period to provide the game's first goals. In game six, goaltender Jonas Hiller stopped 38 out of 39 shots as Ryan Getzlaf and Cory Perry each scored to give the Ducks a 2–1 victory. In game seven, Bobby Ryan pulled the Ducks into a 3–3 tie at 7:37 of the third period. However, Red Wings forward Dan Cleary scored the game-winning goal with 3:00 left in regulation after Hiller lost sight of the puck behind him and pushed it over the goal line, to give the Red Wings a 4–3 victory and the series.

May 1	Anaheim Ducks	2–3	Detroit Red Wings	Joe Louis Arena	Recap
Corey Perry (4) – 07:28		First period	12:33 – pp – Johan Franzen (3)
Teemu Selanne (2) – pp – 19:43		Second period	14:24 – pp – Nicklas Lidstrom (2)
No scoring		Third period	19:10 – Nicklas Lidstrom (3)
Jonas Hiller 34 saves / 37 shots		Goalie stats	Chris Osgood 22 saves / 24 shots

May 3	Anaheim Ducks	4–3	3OT	Detroit Red Wings	Joe Louis Arena	Recap
Ryan Getzlaf (3) – 08:16; Chris Pronger (2) – pp – 08:50		First period		06:00 – pp – Brad Stuart (1); 13:54 – Mikael Samuelsson (1)
Ryan Carter (2) – pp – 04:42		Second period		No scoring
No scoring		Third period		05:19 – Johan Franzen (4)
Todd Marchant (1) – 01:14		Third overtime period		No scoring
Jonas Hiller 59 saves / 62 shots		Goalie stats		Chris Osgood 42 saves / 46 shots

May 5	Detroit Red Wings	1–2	Anaheim Ducks	Honda Center	Recap
No scoring		First period	12:49 – Teemu Selanne (3)
Henrik Zetterberg (4) – pp – 14:20		Second period	08:16 – pp – Scott Niedermayer (2)
No scoring		Third period	No scoring
Chris Osgood 21 saves / 23 shots		Goalie stats	Jonas Hiller 45 saves / 46 shots

May 7	Detroit Red Wings	6–3	Anaheim Ducks	Honda Center	Recap
Johan Franzen (5) – 11:49; Johan Franzen (6) – 19:24		First period	00:42 – Corey Perry (5)
Marian Hossa (3) – 16:02; Marian Hossa (4) – pp – 19:04		Second period	11:03 – Corey Perry (6)
Mikael Samuelsson (2) – 02:46; Henrik Zetterberg (5) – en – 17:27		Third period	10:03 – pp – Scott Niedermayer (3)
Chris Osgood 25 saves / 28 shots		Goalie stats	Jonas Hiller 28 saves / 33 shots Jean-Sebastien Giguere 6 saves / 6 shots

May 10	Anaheim Ducks	1–4	Detroit Red Wings	Joe Louis Arena	Recap
No scoring		First period	No scoring
Ryan Whitney (1) – pp – 15:37		Second period	03:23 – Johan Franzen (7); 04:02 – Jiri Hudler (3)
No scoring		Third period	16:52 – Darren Helm (1); 19:08 – en – Henrik Zetterberg (6)
Jonas Hiller 34 saves / 37 shots		Goalie stats	Chris Osgood 16 saves / 17 shots

May 12	Detroit Red Wings	1–2	Anaheim Ducks	Honda Center	Recap
No scoring		First period	No scoring
No scoring		Second period	02:21 – pp – Ryan Getzlaf (4); 17:35 – Corey Perry (7)
Johan Franzen (8) – pp – 17:35		Third period	No scoring
Chris Osgood 26 saves / 28 shots		Goalie stats	Jonas Hiller 38 saves / 39 shots

May 14	Anaheim Ducks	3–4	Detroit Red Wings	Joe Louis Arena	Recap
No scoring		First period	15:43 – pp – Jiri Hudler (4)
Teemu Selanne (4) – 14:50; Corey Perry (8) – pp – 17:12		Second period	01:17 – Darren Helm (2); 16:23 – Mikael Samuelsson (3)
Bobby Ryan (5) – 07:37		Third period	17:00 – Daniel Cleary (3)
Jonas Hiller 36 saves / 40 shots		Goalie stats	Chris Osgood 24 saves / 27 shots

Detroit won series 4–3

==== (3) Vancouver Canucks vs. (4) Chicago Blackhawks ====
The Chicago Blackhawks eliminated the Vancouver Canucks in six games, to advance to the Western Conference Final for the first time since 1995. This was just the third time that these two teams faced each other in the playoffs. In 1982, the Canucks eliminated the Blackhawks in five games in the Campbell Conference final, while the Blackhawks won a 1995 conference semifinals series in a four-game sweep.

Sami Salo scored at 18:47 in the third period of game one to break a 3–3 tie, giving the Canucks an eventual 5–3 win. The Blackhawks bounced back in game two, overcoming a 2–0 deficit in the second period to go on to a 6–3 victory, with Patrick Sharp and Dave Bolland scoring two goals each. Vancouver regained the series lead in game three, with goaltender Roberto Luongo stopping 23 out of 24 shots and Steve Bernier providing a powerplay goal to earn a 3–1 victory. However, Chicago went on to win the next three games to close the series. First, Martin Havlat tied game four at 17:16 in the third period and Andrew Ladd scoring at 2:52 into overtime to give the Blackhawks a 2–1 victory. Dustin Byfuglien then scored two goals en route to a 4–2 Chicago win in game five. Finally, the Blackhawks won a high-scoring game six, 7–5, with Patrick Kane earning a hat trick.

April 30	Chicago Blackhawks	3–5	Vancouver Canucks	General Motors Place	Recap
No scoring		First period	15:22 – pp – Pavol Demitra (1)
No scoring		Second period	05:13 – Henrik Sedin (2); 15:23 – Ryan Kesler (1)
Patrick Kane (3) – 01:01; Patrick Kane (4) – pp – 10:11; Dave Bolland (1) – 14:31		Third period	18:47 – Sami Salo (2); 19:44 – en – Ryan Johnson (1)
Nikolai Khabibulin 22 saves / 26 shots		Goalie stats	Roberto Luongo 28 saves / 31 shots

May 2	Chicago Blackhawks	6–3	Vancouver Canucks	General Motors Place	Recap
No scoring		First period	05:35 – pp – Sami Salo (3); 06:44 – pp – Alexander Edler (1)
Patrick Sharp (4) – 10:24; Patrick Sharp (5) – pp – 13:30; Dave Bolland (2) – sh – 16:50		Second period	No scoring
Ben Eager (1) – 02:13; Patrick Kane (5) – 05:48; Dave Bolland (3) – en – 18:50		Third period	17:15 – pp – Henrik Sedin (3)
Nikolai Khabibulin 18 saves / 21 shots		Goalie stats	Roberto Luongo 26 saves / 31 shots

May 5	Vancouver Canucks	3–1	Chicago Blackhawks	United Center	Recap
Mason Raymond (1) – 15:34		First period	No scoring
Steve Bernier (2) – pp – 01:00; Henrik Sedin (4) – 08:04		Second period	11:09 – pp – Brian Campbell (2)
No scoring		Third period	No scoring
Roberto Luongo 23 saves / 24 shots		Goalie stats	Nikolai Khabibulin 18 saves / 21 shots

May 7	Vancouver Canucks	1–2	OT	Chicago Blackhawks	United Center	Recap
No scoring		First period		No scoring
Darcy Hordichuk (1) – 08:32		Second period		No scoring
No scoring		Third period		17:16 – Martin Havlat (4)
No scoring		First overtime period		02:52 – Andrew Ladd (2)
Roberto Luongo 26 saves / 28 shots		Goalie stats		Nikolai Khabibulin 14 saves / 15 shots

May 9	Chicago Blackhawks	4–2	Vancouver Canucks	General Motors Place	Recap
Dustin Byfuglien (2) – 15:27		First period	17:54 – pp – Ryan Kesler (2)
Dustin Byfuglien (3) – 18:22		Second period	11:16 – Mats Sundin (2)
Dave Bolland (4) – pp – 14:55; Martin Havlat (5) – en – 18:58		Third period	No scoring
Nikolai Khabibulin 19 saves / 21 shots		Goalie stats	Roberto Luongo 26 saves / 29 shots

May 11	Vancouver Canucks	5–7	Chicago Blackhawks	United Center	Recap
Mason Raymond (2) – 11:13		First period	13:13 – Patrick Kane (6)
Daniel Sedin (3) – 11:09; Shane O'Brien (1) – 14:49		Second period	03:54 – pp – Kris Versteeg (3); 10:17 – pp – Jonathan Toews (3)
Mats Sundin (3) – 03:43; Daniel Sedin (4) – pp – 12:15		Third period	05:41 – Adam Burish (2); 13:00 – Patrick Kane (7); 13:49 – pp – Jonathan Toews (4); 16:17 – Patrick Kane (8)
Roberto Luongo 23 saves / 30 shots		Goalie stats	Nikolai Khabibulin 33 saves / 38 shots

Chicago won series 4–2

== Conference finals ==
=== Eastern Conference final ===
==== (4) Pittsburgh Penguins vs. (6) Carolina Hurricanes ====
This was the first time these two teams met in the playoffs. The Penguins swept the Hurricanes to advance to their second consecutive Stanley Cup Finals (in the process denying a rematch of the 2002 Stanley Cup Finals between the Hurricanes and Red Wings).

Pittsburgh jumped to a 2–0 lead in the first period of Game 1, with goals by Miroslav Satan and Evgeni Malkin, before Philippe Boucher added a third period power play goal. Marc-Andre Fleury made a sprawling save on an Eric Staal one-timer in the closing seconds to allow the Penguins to hang on for a 3–2 victory. Game 2 featured offensive assaults by both teams. Patrick Eaves tied the game for Carolina early in the third period, but Malkin responded by scoring two highlight reel markers to complete a hat trick en route to a 7–4 win. In Game 3, Malkin had two goals and an assist in a 6–2 victory. Carolina outplayed Pittsburgh for much of Game 4 and got off to a hot start when Staal scored on a wrap around move. However, the Penguins scored four unanswered goals, including a Max Talbot tally that ricocheted strangely off of goaltender Cam Ward to let the Penguins take the lead late in the opening frame, as they picked up a 4–1 win.

After the loss to Pittsburgh, the Hurricanes entered a decade-long slump and would not return to the playoffs until 2019.

May 18	Carolina Hurricanes	2–3	Pittsburgh Penguins	Mellon Arena	Recap
No scoring		First period	09:17 – Miroslav Satan (1); 10:41 – Evgeni Malkin (7)
Chad LaRose (3) – 13:04		Second period	No scoring
Joe Corvo (2) – pp – 18:34		Third period	11:33 – pp – Philippe Boucher (1)
Cam Ward 28 saves / 31 shots		Goalie stats	Marc-Andre Fleury 23 saves / 25 shots

May 21	Carolina Hurricanes	4–7	Pittsburgh Penguins	Mellon Arena	Recap
Chad LaRose (4) – 03:07; Jussi Jokinen (7) – 08:40; Dennis Seidenberg (1) – 12:10		First period	01:51 – Sidney Crosby (13); 08:15 – Evgeni Malkin (8)
No scoring		Second period	03:11 – Maxime Talbot (3); 19:52 – Chris Kunitz (1)
Patrick Eaves (1) – 02:35		Third period	08:50 – Evgeni Malkin (9); 12:25 – Evgeni Malkin (10); 18:11 – en – Tyler Kennedy (3)
Cam Ward 35 saves / 41 shots		Goalie stats	Marc-Andre Fleury 24 saves / 28 shots

May 23	Pittsburgh Penguins	6–2	Carolina Hurricanes	RBC Center	Recap
Evgeni Malkin (11) – pp – 06:50; Sidney Crosby (14) – 19:17; Evgeni Malkin (12) – 19:48		First period	04:06 – Matt Cullen (3)
No scoring		Second period	No scoring
Ruslan Fedotenko (5) – 11:29; Craig Adams (2) – en – 18:12; Bill Guerin (6) – pp – 18:52		Third period	01:58 – Sergei Samsonov (5)
Marc-Andre Fleury 32 saves / 34 shots		Goalie stats	Cam Ward 34 saves / 39 shots

May 26	Pittsburgh Penguins	4–1	Carolina Hurricanes	RBC Center	Recap
Ruslan Fedotenko (6) – 08:21; Maxime Talbot (4) – 18:31		First period	01:36 – Eric Staal (10)
Bill Guerin (7) – 12:10		Second period	No scoring
Craig Adams (3) – en – 18:50		Third period	No scoring
Marc-Andre Fleury 30 saves / 31 shots		Goalie stats	Cam Ward 21 saves / 24 shots

Pittsburgh won series 4–0

=== Western Conference final ===
==== (2) Detroit Red Wings vs. (4) Chicago Blackhawks ====
This was the fifteenth playoff meeting between these two teams, with the Blackhawks winning eight of the previous fourteen series. They last met in the 1995 Western Conference Final, which the Red Wings won in five games.

The Red Wings eliminated the Blackhawks in five games to advance to the Stanley Cup Finals for the second straight year and the third time in eight years. Three of the five games in the series were decided in overtime. Dan Cleary scored two goals en route to a 5–2 Detroit victory in Game 1. In Game 2, Jonathan Toews scored two Chicago goals, including one that tied the game at 12:20 in the third period. However, Mikael Samuelsson scored at 5:14 into overtime to give the Red Wings a 3–2 win. Chicago bounced back in Game 3 with a 4–3 win of Patrick Sharp's overtime goal at 1:52 into the extra period. The Blackhawks took an early 3–0 lead in the game but saw Detroit bounce back with three goals from defencemen in the second period. During the game, Blackhawks goaltender Nikolai Khabibulin was injured and replaced for the third period and overtime by Cristobal Huet. The game also featured a controversial hit from Nicklas Kronwall that injured star Chicago winger Martin Havlat. In Game 4, the Red Wings blew out the Blackhawks 6–1, with Marian Hossa and Henrik Zetterberg each tallying a pair of goals. Game 5 was an exhibition in goaltending with Chris Osgood and Cristobal Huet each making a variety of spectacular saves. However, Darren Helm proved to be the eventual hero, scoring at 3:58 into overtime to give the Red Wings a 2–1 win and the series. This was the last Western Conference Final to be played entirely outside of California until 2018.

May 17	Chicago Blackhawks	2–5	Detroit Red Wings	Joe Louis Arena	Recap
Adam Burish (3) – 05:25		First period	08:23 – Daniel Cleary (4)
No scoring		Second period	16:38 – Johan Franzen (9)
Kris Versteeg (4) – pp – 03:12		Third period	07:31 – Mikael Samuelsson (4); 08:58 – Daniel Cleary (5); 19:17 – en – Henrik Zetterberg (7)
Nikolai Khabibulin 38 saves / 42 shots		Goalie stats	Chris Osgood 30 saves / 32 shots

May 19	Chicago Blackhawks	2–3	OT	Detroit Red Wings	Joe Louis Arena	Recap
Jonathan Toews (5) – pp – 12:49		First period		16:43 – pp – Brian Rafalski (2)
No scoring		Second period		14:06 – Daniel Cleary (6)
Jonathan Toews (6) – 12:20		Third period		No scoring
No scoring		First overtime period		05:14 – Mikael Samuelsson (5)
Nikolai Khabibulin 35 saves / 38 shots		Goalie stats		Chris Osgood 37 saves / 39 shots

May 22	Detroit Red Wings	3–4	OT	Chicago Blackhawks	United Center	Recap
No scoring		First period		08:45 – pp – Patrick Sharp (6); 09:50 – Andrew Ladd (3)
Nicklas Lidstrom (4) – pp – 14:38; Brian Rafalski (3) – 17:10; Jonathan Ericsson (2) – 19:01		Second period		00:45 – Samuel Pahlsson (2)
No scoring		Third period		No scoring
No scoring		First overtime period		01:52 – Patrick Sharp (7)
Chris Osgood 23 saves / 27 shots		Goalie stats		Nikolai Khabibulin 21 saves / 24 shots Cristobal Huet 6 saves / 6 shots

May 24	Detroit Red Wings	6–1	Chicago Blackhawks	United Center	Recap
Marian Hossa (5) – sh – 08:41; Johan Franzen (10) – 19:39		First period	No scoring
Valtteri Filppula (1) – pp – 01:13; Marian Hossa (6) – 04:05; Henrik Zetterberg (8) – pp – 07:42		Second period	03:53 – pp – Jonathan Toews (7)
Henrik Zetterberg (9) – pp – 12:47		Third period	No scoring
Chris Osgood 18 saves / 19 shots Ty Conklin 9 saves / 9 shots		Goalie stats	Cristobal Huet 21 saves / 26 shots Corey Crawford 6 saves / 7 shots

May 27	Chicago Blackhawks	1–2	OT	Detroit Red Wings	Joe Louis Arena	Recap
No scoring		First period		No scoring
No scoring		Second period		No scoring
Patrick Kane (9) – 12:53		Third period		06:08 – Daniel Cleary (8)
No scoring		First overtime period		03:58 – Darren Helm (3)
Cristobal Huet 44 saves / 46 shots		Goalie stats		Chris Osgood 30 saves / 31 shots

Detroit won series 4–1

== Stanley Cup Finals ==
This was the second playoff meeting between these two teams and a rematch of the previous year's Stanley Cup Finals which Detroit won in six games. This was the first time since 1983 and 1984 that same teams met in consecutive finals. This was Detroit's twenty-fourth Finals appearance; while Pittsburgh made their fourth appearance in the Finals. The teams split their two-game regular season series.

May 30	Pittsburgh Penguins	1–3	Detroit Red Wings	Joe Louis Arena	Recap
Ruslan Fedotenko (7) – 18:37		First period	13:38 – Brad Stuart (2)
No scoring		Second period	19:02 – Johan Franzen (11)
No scoring		Third period	02:46 – Justin Abdelkader (1)
Marc-Andre Fleury 27 saves / 30 shots		Goalie stats	Chris Osgood 31 saves / 32 shots

May 31	Pittsburgh Penguins	1–3	Detroit Red Wings	Joe Louis Arena	Recap
Evgeni Malkin (13) – pp – 16:50		First period	No scoring
No scoring		Second period	04:21 – Jonathan Ericsson (3); 10:29 – Valtteri Filppula (2)
No scoring		Third period	02:47 – Justin Abdelkader (2)
Marc-Andre Fleury 23 saves / 26 shots		Goalie stats	Chris Osgood 31 saves / 32 shots

June 2	Detroit Red Wings	2–4	Pittsburgh Penguins	Mellon Arena	Recap
Henrik Zetterberg (10) – 06:19; Johan Franzen (12) – pp – 11:33		First period	04:48 – Maxime Talbot (5); 15:57 – pp – Kris Letang (4)
No scoring		Second period	No scoring
No scoring		Third period	10:29 – pp – Sergei Gonchar (3); 19:03 – en – Maxime Talbot (6)
Chris Osgood 17 saves / 20 shots		Goalie stats	Marc-Andre Fleury 27 saves / 29 shots

June 4	Detroit Red Wings	2–4	Pittsburgh Penguins	Mellon Arena	Recap
Darren Helm (4) – 18:19		First period	02:39 – pp – Evgeni Malkin (14)
Brad Stuart (3) – 00:46		Second period	08:35 – sh – Jordan Staal (3); 10:34 – Sidney Crosby (15); 14:12 – Tyler Kennedy (4)
No scoring		Third period	No scoring
Chris Osgood 27 saves / 31 shots		Goalie stats	Marc-Andre Fleury 37 saves / 39 shots

June 6	Pittsburgh Penguins	0–5	Detroit Red Wings	Joe Louis Arena	Recap
No scoring		First period	13:32 – Daniel Cleary (9)
No scoring		Second period	01:44 – Valtteri Filppula (3); 06:11 – pp – Niklas Kronwall (2); 08:26 – pp – Brian Rafalski (3); 15:40 – pp – Henrik Zetterberg (11)
No scoring		Third period	No scoring
Marc-Andre Fleury 16 saves / 21 shots Mathieu Garon 8 saves / 8 shots		Goalie stats	Chris Osgood 22 saves / 22 shots

June 9	Detroit Red Wings	1–2	Pittsburgh Penguins	Mellon Arena	Recap
No scoring		First period	No scoring
No scoring		Second period	00:51 – Jordan Staal (4)
Kris Draper (1) – 08:01		Third period	05:35 – Tyler Kennedy (5)
Chris Osgood 29 saves / 31 shots		Goalie stats	Marc-Andre Fleury 25 saves / 26 shots

June 12	Pittsburgh Penguins	2–1	Detroit Red Wings	Joe Louis Arena	Recap
No scoring		First period	No scoring
Maxime Talbot (7) – 01:13; Maxime Talbot (8) – 10:07		Second period	No scoring
No scoring		Third period	13:53 – Jonathan Ericsson (4)
Marc-Andre Fleury 23 saves / 24 shots		Goalie stats	Chris Osgood 16 saves / 18 shots

Pittsburgh won series 4–3

== Player statistics ==
=== Skaters ===
These are the top ten skaters based on points. If the list exceeds ten skaters because of a tie in points, all of the tied skaters are shown.

Player	Team	GP	G	A	Pts	+/–	PIM
Evgeni Malkin	Pittsburgh Penguins	24	14	22	36	+3	51
Sidney Crosby	Pittsburgh Penguins	24	15	16	31	+9	14
Henrik Zetterberg	Detroit Red Wings	23	11	13	24	+13	13
Johan Franzen	Detroit Red Wings	23	12	11	23	+8	12
Alexander Ovechkin	Washington Capitals	14	11	10	21	+10	8
Ryan Getzlaf	Anaheim Ducks	13	4	14	18	+3	25
Nicklas Lidstrom	Detroit Red Wings	21	4	12	16	+11	6
Valtteri Filppula	Detroit Red Wings	23	3	13	16	+8	8
Eric Staal	Carolina Hurricanes	18	10	5	15	-3	4
Daniel Cleary	Detroit Red Wings	23	9	6	15	+17	12
Bill Guerin	Pittsburgh Penguins	24	7	8	15	+8	15
Marian Hossa	Detroit Red Wings	23	6	9	15	+5	10
Martin Havlat	Chicago Blackhawks	16	5	10	15	0	8
Nicklas Backstrom	Washington Capitals	14	3	12	15	+3	8

GP = Games played; G = Goals; A = Assists; Pts = Points; +/– = Plus/minus; PIM = Penalty minutes

=== Goaltending ===
This is a combined table of the top five goaltenders based on goals against average and the top five goaltenders based on save percentage with at least 420 minutes played. The table is sorted by GAA, and the criteria for inclusion is bolded.

Player	Team	GP	W	L	SA	GA	GAA	SV%	SO	Min
Tim Thomas	Boston Bruins	11	7	4	323	21	**1.85**	**.935**	1	679:44
Chris Osgood	Detroit Red Wings	23	15	8	637	47	**2.01**	**.926**	2	1,405:51
Jonas Hiller	Anaheim Ducks	13	7	6	524	30	**2.23**	**.943**	2	806:43
Martin Brodeur	New Jersey Devils	7	3	4	239	17	**2.39**	**.929**	1	426:41
Roberto Luongo	Vancouver Canucks	10	6	4	304	26	**2.52**	.914	1	617:57
Semyon Varlamov	Washington Capitals	13	7	6	389	32	2.53	**.918**	2	758:52

GP = Games played; W = Wins; L = Losses; SA = Shots against; GA = Goals against; GAA = Goals against average; SV% = Save percentage; SO = Shutouts; TOI = Time on ice (minutes:seconds)

== Television ==
National Canadian English-language coverage of the playoffs were split between the CBC and TSN, with the CBC holding exclusive rights to the Stanley Cup Finals. French-language telecasts were broadcast on RDS and RDS2. This was the first postseason that the CBC and TSN selected the rights to individual series in the first three rounds using a draft-like setup. The CBC had first, second, fourth, and sixth choices of first-round series; first and third in the second round, and first in the conference finals. TSN then had third, fifth, seventh, and eighth choices of first-round series; second and fourth in the second round; and second in the conference finals. These changes also allowed TSN to broadcast playoff games involving Canadian teams for the first time, removing the CBC's exclusivity on them.

In the United States, coverage was split between NBC and Versus. During the first three rounds, NBC primarily televised weekend afternoon games and Versus aired evening games. During the first and second round, excluding games exclusively broadcast on NBC, the regional rights holders of each participating U.S. team produced local telecasts of their respective games. Not all first and second-round games were nationally televised, while the conference finals were exclusively broadcast on either NBC or Versus. NBC then aired the first two and final three games of the Stanley Cup Finals, while Versus broadcast games three and four.

== See also ==
- 2008–09 NHL season
- List of NHL seasons

Preceded by 2008 Stanley Cup playoffs	Stanley Cup playoffs 2009	Succeeded by 2010 Stanley Cup playoffs
