= Jonathan Ericsson =

Swedish ice hockey player (born 1984)

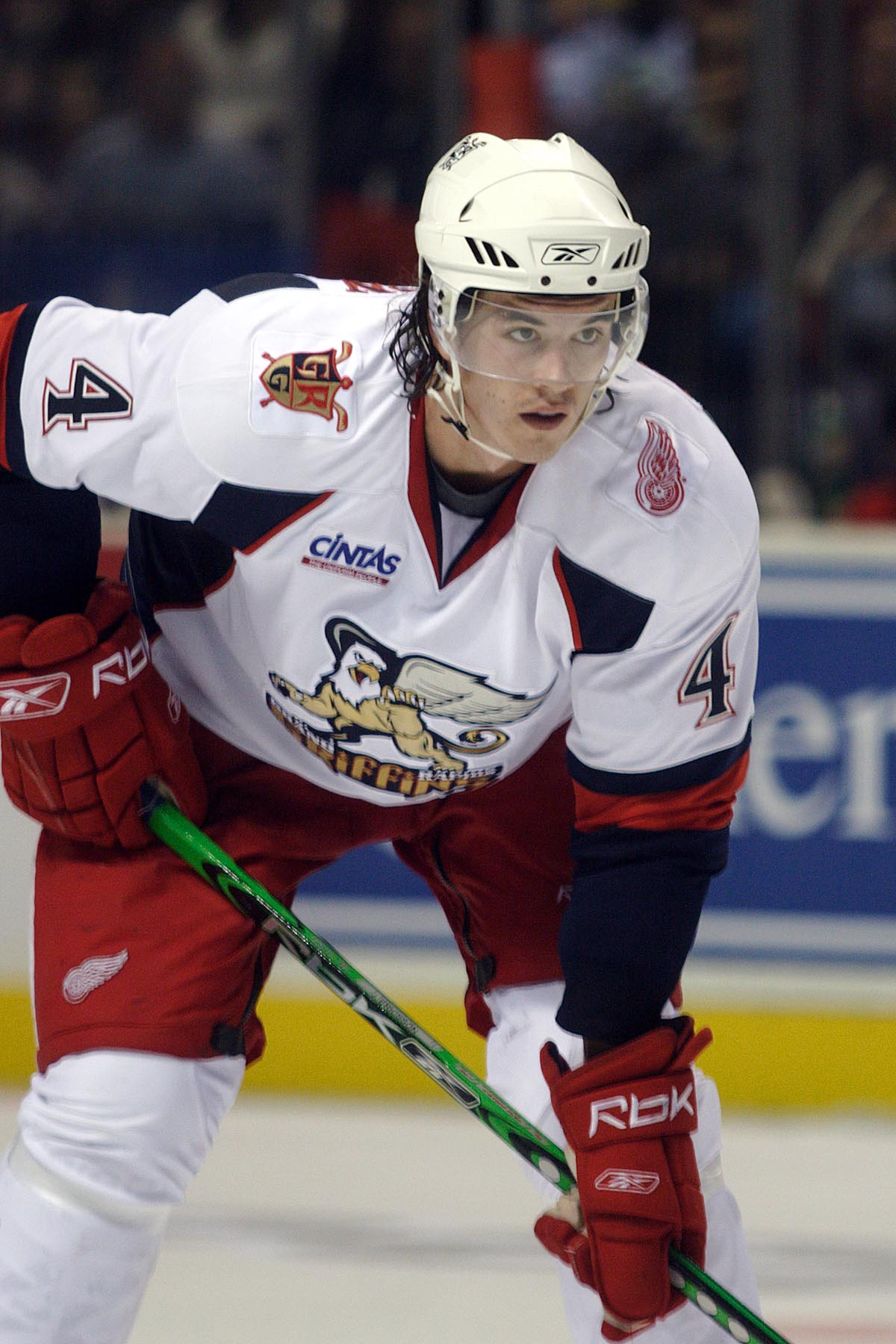
- Ericsson with the Grand Rapids Griffins in 2008
- Born: 2 March 1984 (age 42) Karlskrona, Sweden
- Height: 6 ft 4 in (193 cm)
- Weight: 220 lb (100 kg; 15 st 10 lb)
- Position: Defence
- Shot: Left
- Played for: Södertälje SK; Detroit Red Wings
- National team: Sweden
- NHL draft: 291st overall, 2002; Detroit Red Wings
- Playing career: 2003–2020

Jonathan Ericsson (born 2 March 1984) is a Swedish former professional ice hockey player. A defenceman, he was drafted in the ninth round, 291st overall, of the 2002 NHL entry draft and was the final pick of the draft. He has played his entire National Hockey League (NHL) career with the Red Wings organization.

== Playing career ==
Ericsson originally began his playing career as a centre, playing all but one game of the 2001–02 season at the position for HC Vita Hästen's junior team. However, after playing one game as a defenceman, Detroit Red Wings scout Håkan Andersson convinced Ericsson to permanently transition to defence.

Ericsson was drafted 291st overall in the ninth round of the 2002 NHL entry draft as the last player selected in the draft by Detroit.

Throughout his next four seasons, Ericsson played for several teams in his native Sweden, a period of time which also saw him switching between centre and defence as his teams saw fit. After his 2005–06 season, Detroit signed him to a two-year, entry-level contract and brought him to the United States to play for their American Hockey League (AHL) affiliate, the Grand Rapids Griffins.

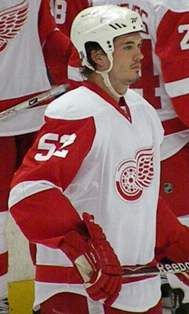
Ericsson with the Detroit Red Wings in 2009

Ericsson then played his first career NHL game on 22 February 2008, against the Calgary Flames, and scored his first career NHL goal the following game, on 26 February, against Edmonton Oilers goaltender Mathieu Garon. Although he did not qualify under NHL rules to have his name engraved on the Stanley Cup, Ericsson was nonetheless included on the 2008 Detroit Red Wings' Stanley Cup-winning team photograph, also being awarded a Stanley Cup ring for his efforts with the team. During the 2008–09 regular season, he recorded one goal and three assists. On 16 April 2009, Ericsson played in his first Stanley Cup playoff game with the Red Wings, in game 1 of the first round of the 2009 playoffs against the Columbus Blue Jackets. He recorded his first career playoff point in this game, a goal.

In game 1 of the second round of the 2009 playoffs, against the Anaheim Ducks, Ericsson recorded two assists and also fought Ducks winger Corey Perry. Ericsson would then score a goal and an assist in Detroit's Western Conference final matchup with the team's division rival, the Chicago Blackhawks, and recorded two goals with an assist in the Stanley Cup Final against the Pittsburgh Penguins. Ericsson scored Detroit's only goal in game 7 of their 2–1 loss to Pittsburgh. At the end of the season, he won the 2009 Detroit Sports Broadcasters Association (DSBA)-Detroit Red Wings Rookie of the Year Award.

In 2008, Ericsson signed a three-year contract extension with the Detroit Red Wings carrying an annual average of $2.7 million. In 2009–10 season, Ericsson scored four goals and nine assists for 13 points in 62 games. In 2011, he signed a three-year $9.75 million contract with the Red Wings.

On 27 November 2013, Ericsson signed a six-year, $25.5 million contract extension with the Red Wings.

During the 2016–17 season, Ericsson suffered a season-ending wrist injury in February, limiting him to 51 games in which he contributed 9 points.

On 23 October 2019, Ericsson was assigned to the Grand Rapids Griffins of the AHL. During the 2019–20 season, he recorded two assists in 10 games for the Griffins. He was recalled by the Red Wings on 13 November.

== International play ==
Medal record

Men's ice hockey

Representing Sweden

Olympic Games
| Silver medal – second place | 2014 Sochi | |

World Championships
| Bronze medal – third place | 2010 Germany | |

Ericsson's older brother, Jimmie Ericsson, is a forward currently playing for Skellefteå AIK in the Swedish Hockey League. The Ericsson brothers were set to play together professionally for the first time at the 2010 World Championships. Following Detroit's elimination in the 2010 playoffs, Jonathan joined Sweden's national team at the World Championships. The brothers were originally in the lineup together, though Jimmie injured his knee on his first shift, missing the remainder of the tournament; the two were never on the ice together. In the tournament, Jonathan Ericsson finished the tournament with the most average minutes per game amongst Swedish skaters, and was also selected as one of the best players on the team as selected by the coach. The brothers eventually played together for the first time at the 2014 Winter Olympics in Sochi, where they won a silver medal after losing to Canada in the tournament final.

== Personal life ==
Ericsson married long-time girlfriend Evelina Hedman in July 2014. In October 2013, Evelina gave birth to a daughter, Liv. She was named in memory of Ericsson's friend and former teammate Stefan Liv.

== Career statistics ==
=== Regular season and playoffs ===
| | | | Regular season | | | | | Playoffs |
| Season | Team | League | GP | G | A | Pts | PIM | GP | G | A | Pts | PIM |
|---|---|---|---|---|---|---|---|---|---|---|---|---|
| 2002–03 | HC Vita Hästen | Div.1 | 40 | 2 | 4 | 6 | 36 | — | — | — | — | — |
| 2003–04 | Södertälje SK | J20 | 16 | 3 | 4 | 7 | 18 | 2 | 0 | 0 | 0 | 0 |
| 2003–04 | Södertälje SK | SEL | 42 | 1 | 0 | 1 | 12 | — | — | — | — | — |
| 2004–05 | Södertälje SK | J20 | 7 | 0 | 2 | 2 | 6 | — | — | — | — | — |
| 2004–05 | Södertälje SK | SEL | 15 | 0 | 0 | 0 | 4 | 1 | 0 | 0 | 0 | 0 |
| 2004–05 | Huddinge IK | Allsv | 24 | 4 | 7 | 11 | 36 | — | — | — | — | — |
| 2005–06 | Södertälje SK | J20 | 1 | 0 | 0 | 0 | 2 | — | — | — | — | — |
| 2005–06 | Södertälje SK | SEL | 24 | 0 | 0 | 0 | 20 | — | — | — | — | — |
| 2005–06 | Almtuna IS | Allsv | 19 | 2 | 3 | 5 | 44 | — | — | — | — | — |
| 2006–07 | Grand Rapids Griffins | AHL | 67 | 5 | 24 | 29 | 102 | 7 | 0 | 0 | 0 | 8 |
| 2007–08 | Grand Rapids Griffins | AHL | 69 | 10 | 24 | 34 | 83 | — | — | — | — | — |
| 2007–08 | Detroit Red Wings | NHL | 8 | 1 | 0 | 1 | 4 | — | — | — | — | — |
| 2008–09 | Grand Rapids Griffins | AHL | 40 | 2 | 13 | 15 | 48 | — | — | — | — | — |
| 2008–09 | Detroit Red Wings | NHL | 19 | 1 | 3 | 4 | 15 | 22 | 4 | 4 | 8 | 25 |
| 2009–10 | Detroit Red Wings | NHL | 62 | 4 | 9 | 13 | 44 | 12 | 0 | 2 | 2 | 8 |
| 2010–11 | Detroit Red Wings | NHL | 74 | 3 | 12 | 15 | 87 | 11 | 1 | 2 | 3 | 4 |
| 2011–12 | Detroit Red Wings | NHL | 69 | 1 | 10 | 11 | 47 | 5 | 0 | 0 | 0 | 6 |
| 2012–13 | HC Vita Hästen | Div.1 | 3 | 0 | 3 | 3 | 4 | — | — | — | — | — |
| 2012–13 | Södertälje SK | Allsv | 4 | 0 | 1 | 1 | 6 | — | — | — | — | — |
| 2012–13 | Detroit Red Wings | NHL | 45 | 3 | 10 | 13 | 29 | 14 | 0 | 3 | 3 | 2 |
| 2013–14 | Detroit Red Wings | NHL | 48 | 1 | 10 | 11 | 34 | — | — | — | — | — |
| 2014–15 | Detroit Red Wings | NHL | 82 | 3 | 12 | 15 | 70 | 7 | 0 | 4 | 4 | 8 |
| 2015–16 | Detroit Red Wings | NHL | 71 | 3 | 12 | 15 | 56 | 5 | 0 | 1 | 1 | 2 |
| 2016–17 | Detroit Red Wings | NHL | 51 | 1 | 8 | 9 | 63 | — | — | — | — | — |
| 2017–18 | Detroit Red Wings | NHL | 81 | 3 | 10 | 13 | 47 | — | — | — | — | — |
| 2018–19 | Detroit Red Wings | NHL | 52 | 3 | 2 | 5 | 35 | — | — | — | — | — |
| 2019–20 | Grand Rapids Griffins | AHL | 10 | 0 | 2 | 2 | 8 | — | — | — | — | — |
| 2019–20 | Detroit Red Wings | NHL | 18 | 0 | 0 | 0 | 4 | — | — | — | — | — |
| SEL totals | | | 81 | 1 | 0 | 1 | 36 | 1 | 0 | 0 | 0 | 0 |
| NHL totals | | | 680 | 27 | 98 | 125 | 535 | 76 | 5 | 16 | 21 | 55 |

=== International ===
| Year | Team | Event | Result | GP | G | A | Pts | PIM |
|---|---|---|---|---|---|---|---|---|
| 2010 | Sweden | WC | 3rd place, bronze medalist(s) | 7 | 0 | 3 | 3 | 2 |
| 2012 | Sweden | WC | 6th | 2 | 1 | 0 | 1 | 2 |
| 2014 | Sweden | OG | 2nd place, silver medalist(s) | 6 | 0 | 1 | 1 | 8 |
| Senior totals | | | | 15 | 1 | 4 | 5 | 12 |

== Awards ==
- Named to the PlanetUSA AHL All-Star Team in 2008.
- Named as Detroit Red Wings' "Rookie of the Year" by the Detroit Sports Broadcasters Association in 2009.

== See also ==
- List of Olympic medalist families
