= Tyler Kennedy =

Canadian ice hockey player (born 1986)

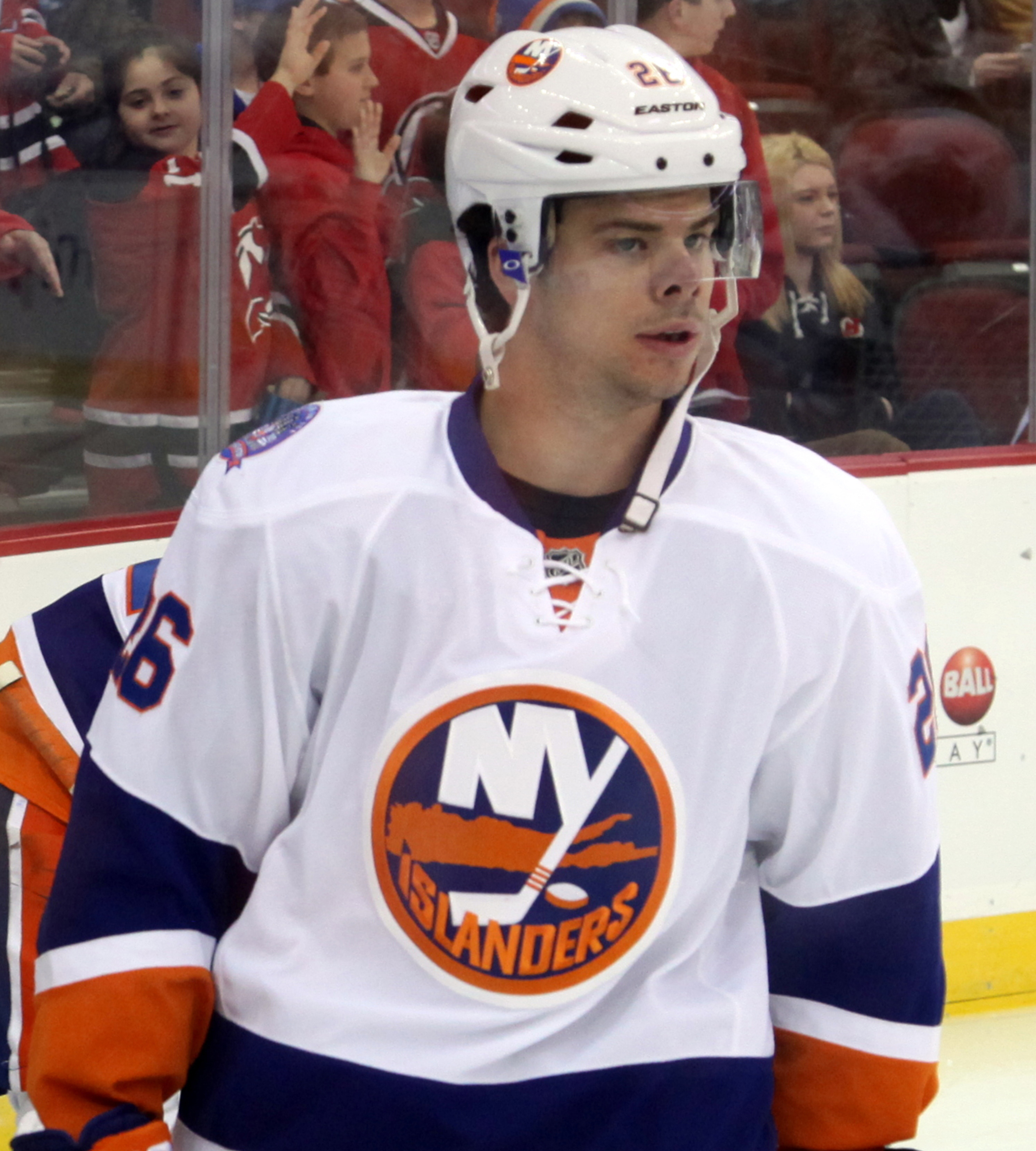
- Kennedy in March 2015
- Born: July 15, 1986 (age 40) Sault Ste. Marie, Ontario, Canada
- Height: 5 ft 11 in (180 cm)
- Weight: 185 lb (84 kg; 13 st 3 lb)
- Position: Centre
- Shot: Right
- Played for: Pittsburgh Penguins; San Jose Sharks; New York Islanders; New Jersey Devils
- NHL draft: 99th overall, 2004; Pittsburgh Penguins
- Playing career: 2007–2016

Tyler Kennedy (born July 15, 1986) is a Canadian-American former professional ice hockey centre who played nine seasons in the National Hockey League (NHL) for the Pittsburgh Penguins, San Jose Sharks, New York Islanders, and New Jersey Devils. He was selected by the Penguins in the fourth round, 99th overall, of the 2004 NHL entry draft.

== Playing career ==
=== Junior and Pittsburgh Penguins ===
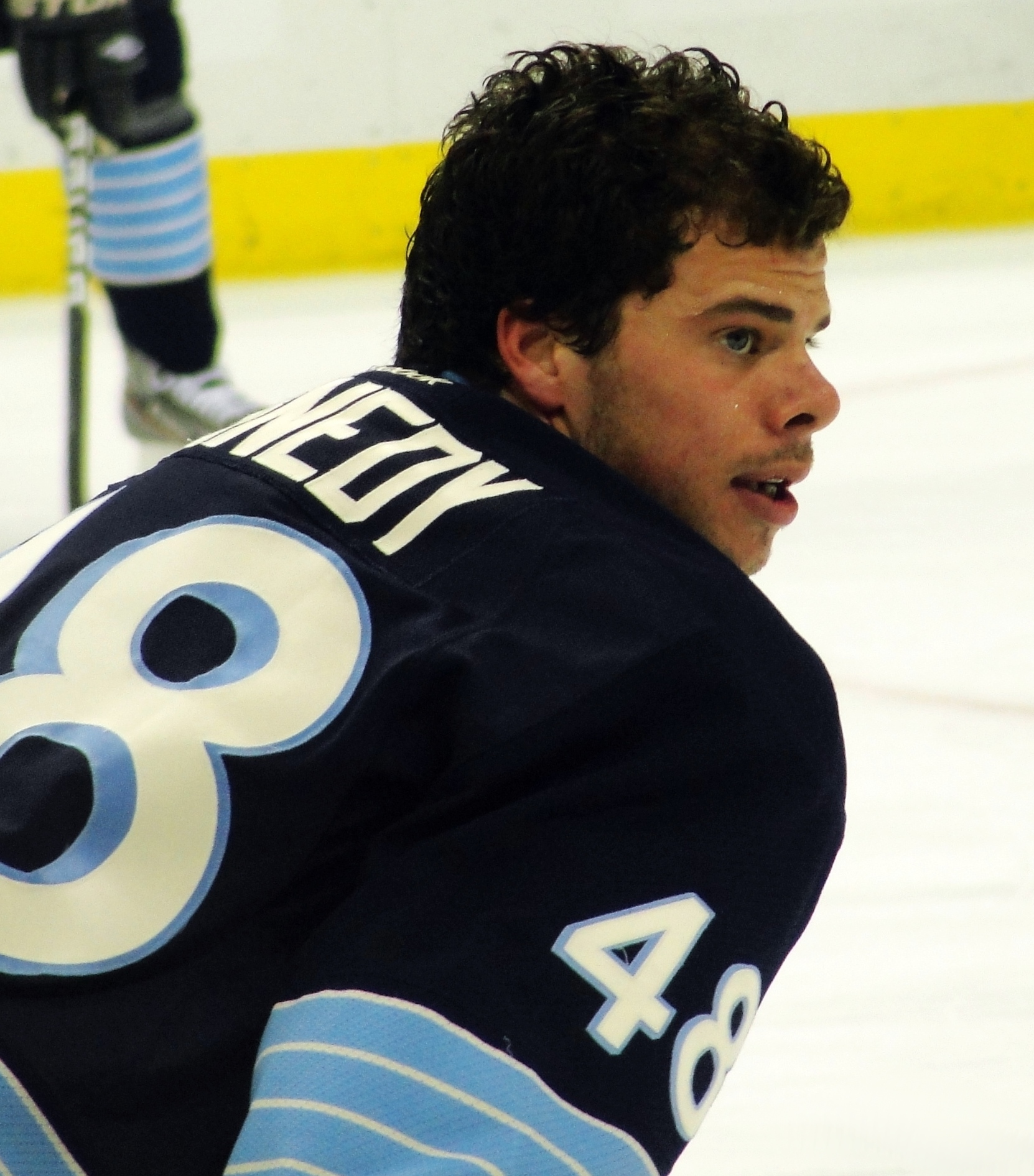
Kennedy with the Pittsburgh Penguins in 2012

Kennedy was drafted by the Pittsburgh Penguins in the fourth round, 99th overall, of the 2004 NHL entry draft. After being selected, Kennedy played two seasons with the Sault Ste. Marie Greyhounds of the Ontario Hockey League (OHL). He then began playing for Pittsburgh's American Hockey League (AHL) affiliate, the Wilkes-Barre/Scranton Penguins, for the 2006–07 season. The next season, 2007–08, Kennedy then played in his first NHL game on October 27, 2007, against the Montreal Canadiens. He later scored his first career NHL goal on November 3 against the New York Islanders.

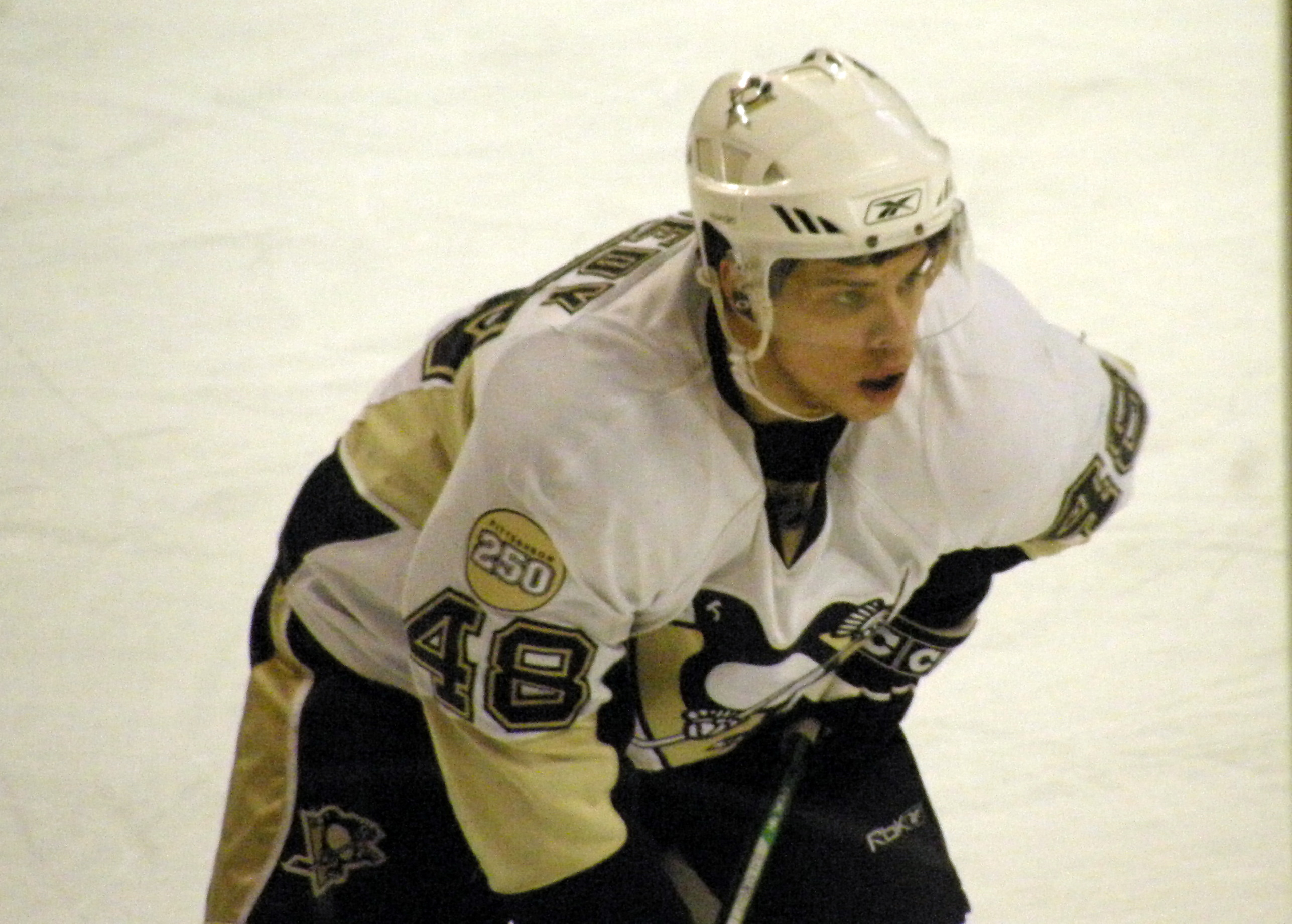
Kennedy with the Pittsburgh Penguins in February 2008.

In his debut season, Kennedy was named to the NHL's YoungStars Team in 2008 alongside Penguins teammate Kris Letang. However, Kennedy was unable to compete in the game due to mononucleosis. In September 2008, just prior to the 2008–09 season, the Penguins signed Kennedy to a new contract effective through to the 2010–11 season.

In the 2009 Stanley Cup Final against the Detroit Red Wings, Kennedy scored a goal in game four of the series, also adding the game-winning goal in game six. The Penguins would go on to defeat Detroit in seven games to win the Stanley Cup.

Although up to this point Kennedy has had a low profile in terms of hockey fame, he attracted some notoriety when Penguins fans and ultimately the public address announcer at Mellon Arena would chant his name in the style of former World Wrestling Entertainment (WWE) wrestler Mr. Kennedy (Ken Anderson).

During the 2011 off-season, Kennedy signed a new contract with the Penguins, although his signing caused some controversy when it was reported that Pittsburgh may have deterred former Penguin legend Jaromír Jágr by signing Kennedy. Jágr later signed with the Philadelphia Flyers, Pittsburgh's state rivals. Early in the 2011–12 season with the Penguins, Kennedy was sidelined by a concussion. He finished the season with 33 points in 60 games.

=== San Jose Sharks ===
During the 2013 NHL entry draft, Kennedy was traded to the San Jose Sharks in exchange for a second-round draft pick. His production declined upon arriving in San Jose, scoring only 4 goals and 17 points in 67 games.

=== New York Islanders and New Jersey Devils ===
The following season, Kennedy was traded to the New York Islanders in exchange for a conditional third-round pick in the 2016 NHL entry draft. He finished the season appearing in 13 regular season games for the club and three games during the 2015 Stanley Cup playoffs.

In September 2015, Kennedy attended the New Jersey Devils' training camp on a professional try-out (PTO) contract; he was released after appearing in three pre-season games. Unsigned after the first quarter of the 2015–16 season played, Kennedy returned to the Devils in training with the club on another PTO contract on November 18, 2015. On November 27, Kennedy signed a one-year, two-way contract with New Jersey worth $600,000. Appearing in 50 games for the team, Kennedy scored 3 goals and 16 points.

=== Retirement ===
Kennedy announced his retirement from professional hockey on January 3, 2017. He finished his NHL career with 89 goals and 215 points in 527 games, as well as one Stanley Cup win.

== Personal life ==
Kennedy married Brandi Engel on May 9, 2014, in Maui, Hawaii. The couple has three children. He obtained American citizenship in December 2022.

== Awards ==
- Stanley Cup champion – 2009

== Career statistics ==
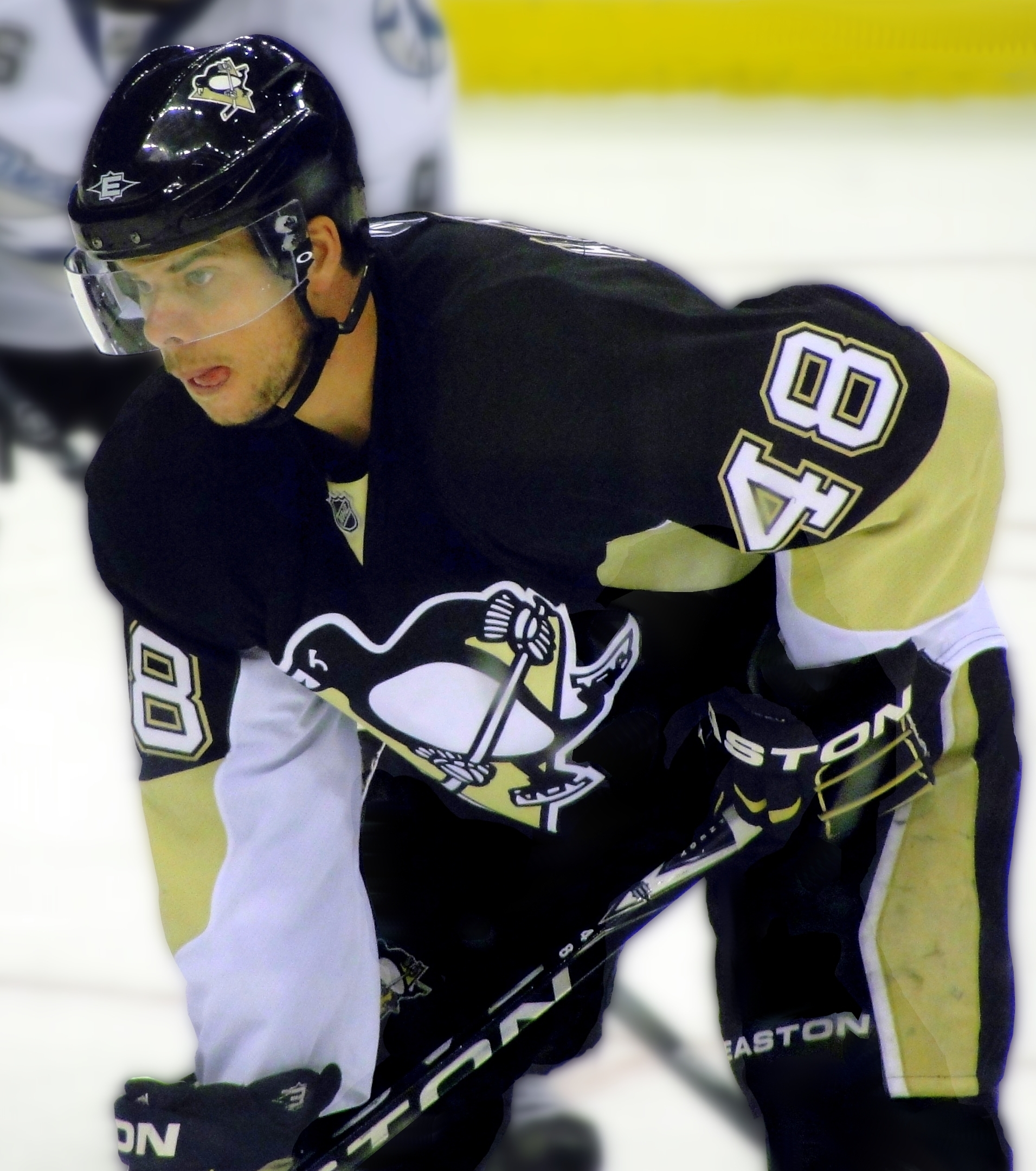
Tyler Kennedy, April 2011.

			Regular Season					Playoffs
Season	Team	League	GP	G	A	Pts	PIM	GP	G	A	Pts	PIM
2002–03	Sault Ste. Marie Jr. Greyhounds	NOJHL	6	8	8	16	4	—	—	—	—	—
2002–03	Sault Ste. Marie Greyhounds	OHL	61	5	10	15	33	4	0	0	0	0
2003–04	Sault Ste. Marie Greyhounds	OHL	63	16	26	42	28	—	—	—	—	—
2004–05	Sault Ste. Marie Greyhounds	OHL	61	21	36	57	37	4	1	3	4	4
2005–06	Sault Ste. Marie Greyhounds	OHL	64	22	48	70	60	4	1	2	3	2
2006–07	Wilkes–Barre/Scranton Penguins	AHL	40	12	25	37	20	—	—	—	—	—
2007–08	Wilkes–Barre/Scranton Penguins	AHL	10	5	4	9	10	—	—	—	—	—
2007–08	Pittsburgh Penguins	NHL	55	10	9	19	35	20	0	4	4	13
2008–09	Pittsburgh Penguins	NHL	67	15	20	35	30	24	5	4	9	4
2009–10	Pittsburgh Penguins	NHL	64	13	12	25	31	10	0	0	0	2
2010–11	Pittsburgh Penguins	NHL	80	21	24	45	37	7	2	1	3	2
2011–12	Pittsburgh Penguins	NHL	60	11	22	33	29	6	3	3	6	2
2012–13	Pittsburgh Penguins	NHL	46	6	5	11	19	9	2	3	5	2
2013–14	San Jose Sharks	NHL	67	4	13	17	34	—	—	—	—	—
2014–15	Worcester Sharks	AHL	3	2	1	3	0	—	—	—	—	—
2014–15	San Jose Sharks	NHL	25	4	5	9	8	—	—	—	—	—
2014–15	New York Islanders	NHL	13	2	3	5	2	3	0	0	0	2
2015–16	New Jersey Devils	NHL	50	3	13	16	14	—	—	—	—	—
NHL totals			527	89	126	215	239	79	12	15	27	27
