= Alex Goligoski =

American ice hockey player (born 1985)

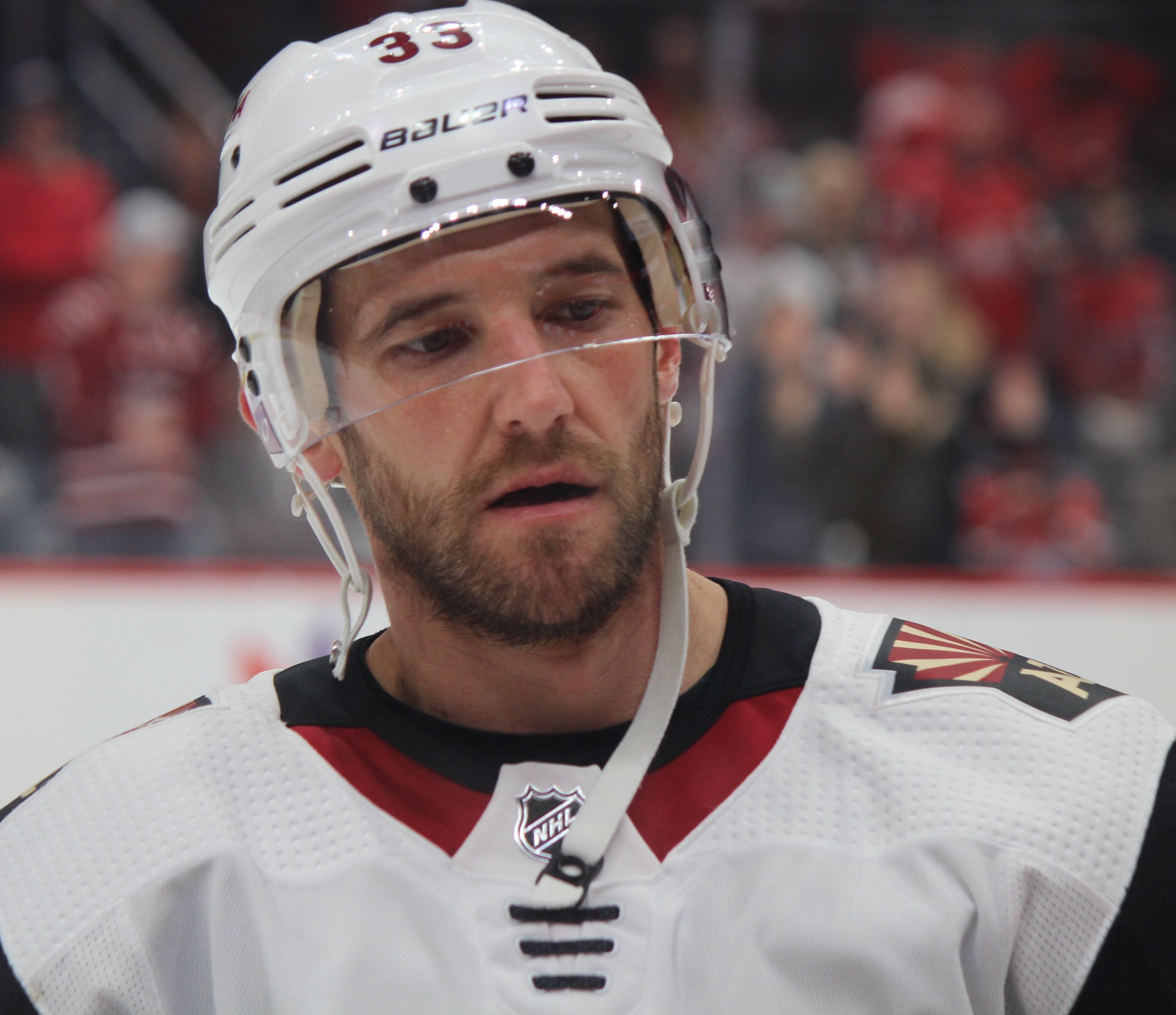
- Goligoski with the Arizona Coyotes in 2019
- Born: July 30, 1985 (age 41) Grand Rapids, Minnesota, U.S.
- Height: 5 ft 11 in (180 cm)
- Weight: 185 lb (84 kg; 13 st 3 lb)
- Position: Defense
- Shot: Left
- Played for: Pittsburgh Penguins; Dallas Stars; Arizona Coyotes; Minnesota Wild
- National team: United States
- NHL draft: 61st overall, 2004; Pittsburgh Penguins
- Playing career: 2007–2024

Alexander Goligoski (born July 30, 1985) is an American former professional ice hockey defenseman who played 17 seasons in the National Hockey League (NHL) for the Pittsburgh Penguins, Dallas Stars, Arizona Coyotes, and Minnesota Wild. Goligoski was drafted by Pittsburgh in the second round, 61st overall, of the 2004 NHL entry draft, and won the Stanley Cup with them in 2009.

== Playing career ==
=== Amateur ===
Goligoski was drafted by the Pittsburgh Penguins in the second round from Grand Rapids High School (Thunderhawks), 61st overall, of the 2004 NHL entry draft. After being drafted, Goligoski played college hockey at Minnesota from 2004 to 2007, where he was assistant captain with Kellen Briggs. In 2004–05, he was named to the All-WCHA Rookie Team. In 2005–06, he was named to the All-WCHA Second Team.

=== Professional ===
==== Pittsburgh Penguins ====
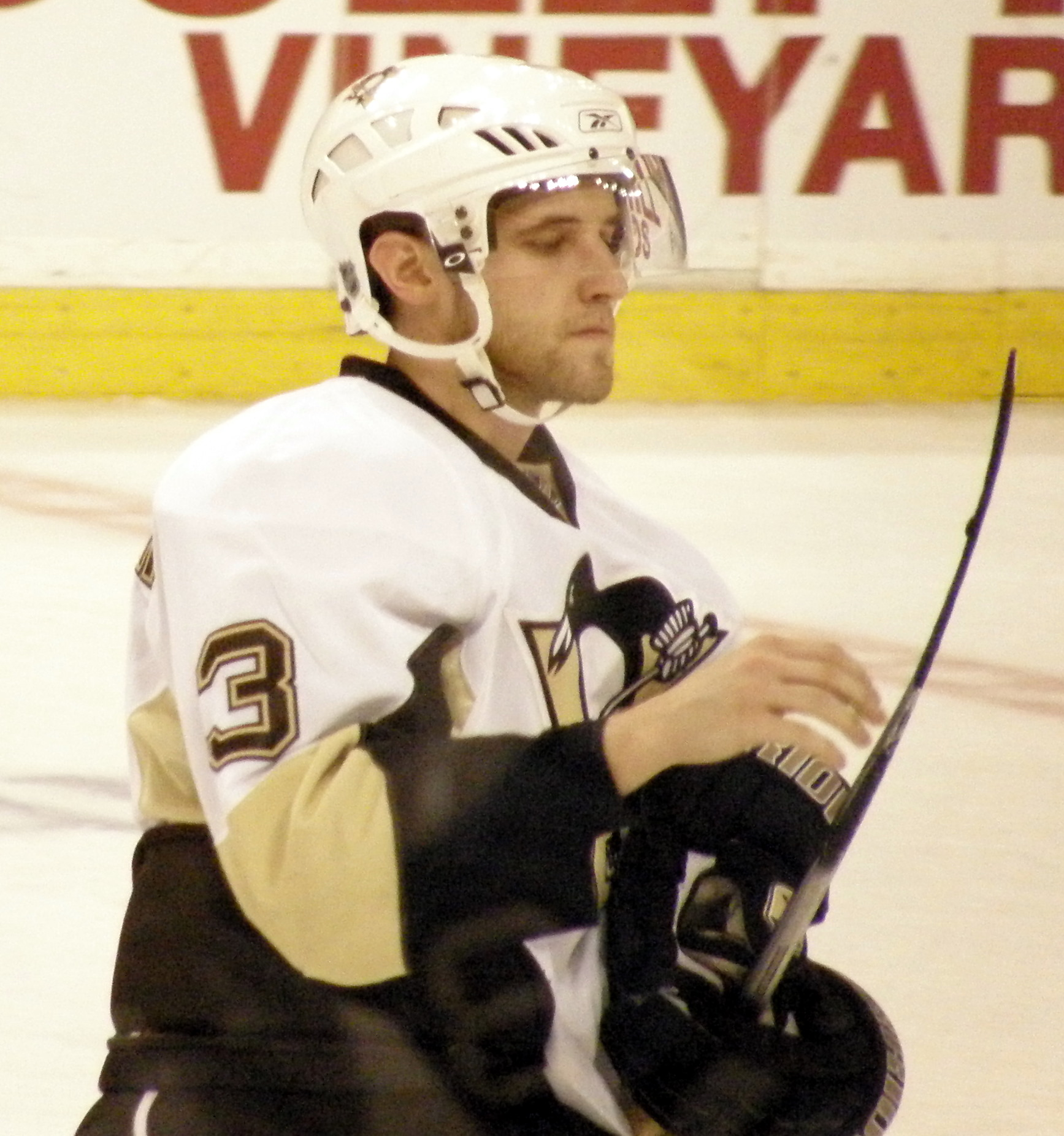
Goligoski with the Penguins in March 2010.

He began his professional career with the Penguins' American Hockey League (AHL) affiliate, the Wilkes-Barre/Scranton Penguins in 2007. Goligoski was then recalled by Pittsburgh on February 5, 2008, and played his first NHL game against the Boston Bruins on February 13. After being returned to Wilkes-Barre, he again later recalled by Pittsburgh, registering his first point, an assist, on March 1 against the Ottawa Senators.

Due to injuries to Sergei Gonchar and Ryan Whitney, Goligoski began the 2008–09 season on the roster for Pittsburgh. He scored his first NHL goal in his first game that season against Alex Auld of the Ottawa Senators. On November 13, Goligoski scored on his first shootout attempt of his career; the goal won the game for the Penguins. He was a member of the 2009 Stanley Cup-winning Penguins team.

On June 15, 2009, Goligoski signed a three-year, $5.5 million extension with the Penguins.

==== Dallas Stars ====
On February 21, 2011, Goligoski was traded to the Dallas Stars in exchange for left winger James Neal and defenseman Matt Niskanen. He made his debut with the team two days later where he logged 23:34 of ice time and recorded one shot on goal. As the Stars began a playoff push, Goligoski saw increased ice time per game and often played over 30 minutes. Over his 23 games with Dallas, Goligoski averaged 26:04 of ice time per game and contributed five goals, three on the power play, and 15 points over that span. Following the 2010–11 season, Goligoski was invited to play for the United States at the 2011 IIHF World Championship in Slovakia. He declined, however, because he had not had much off-time in the past few seasons.

Goligoski returned to the Dallas Stars for the 2011–12 season, his first full season with the team. He began the season strong, quickly resuming his pace from the previous season. As the Stars maintained a winning 11–5–0 record, he ranked second among Dallas defensemen in scoring with two goals and four assists. However, after breaking his thumb on November 11, Goligoski was placed on injured reserve by the Stars. Despite missing 11 games, Goligoski still ranked third among Dallas defensemen upon returning to the lineup on December 8. By mid-January, Goligoski led all teammates in overall time-on-ice per-game as well as power play time-on-ice per-game. While logging these high minutes, he also compiled seven points through 11 games after registering one goal and one assist in the previous 13. His efforts during the season earned him a four-year, $18.4 million contract extension on January 23, 2012. He finished the season leading all Dallas blueliners with nine goals and 30 points although the Stars failed to qualify for the 2012 Stanley Cup playoffs.

As a result of the 2012–13 NHL lockout, Goligoski and the Stars played a shortened season starting in January 2013 instead of October 2012. He struggled through the start of the season, tallying three points and a plus-two rating in ten games. As such, he was a healthy scratch on February 6 for the first time since his rookie season in Pittsburgh. Goligoski later credited the early season scratch for helping him better evaluate his game. He returned the lineup the following game and played alongside Jamie Oleksiak as the Stars' top defensive pairing. As the season progressed, Goligoski played an integral role in improving the Stars' 2013 Stanley Cup playoffs chances. By early April, he had accumulated 22 points in 38 games and led the Stars in plus-minus at plus-5. Although he missed a few games in April 2013 due to a fractured bone, Goligoski finished the season with three goals and 24 assists. Goligoski also found good chemistry with Brenden Dillon in the final months of the season that allowed him to free up his own play moving the puck up the ice.

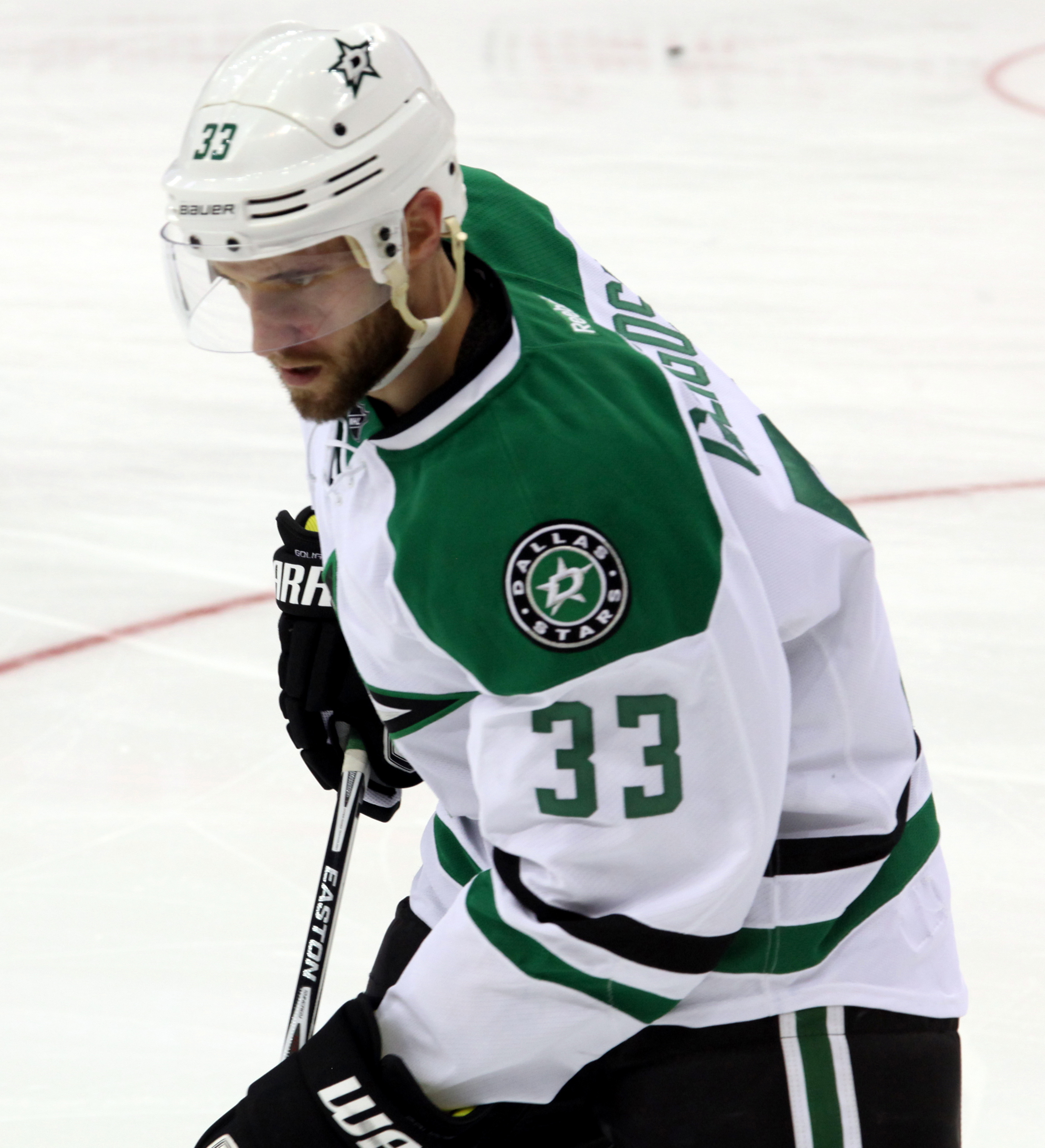
Goligoski with the Dallas Stars in 2014

Goligoski improved during the 2013–14 season, finishing third on the team with 42 points. He failed to impress the Stars coaching staff to start the season and was subsequently made a healthy scratch early in October. At the time of the scratch, he had been pointless through eight games and was a minus-10. In an effort to improve the Stars' playing record, Goligoski was tested out on the Stars' fourth line as another forward. Upon returning to the lineup, Goligoski was paired with Jordie Benn as Ruff did not want to change the other defensive pairings. He immediately bounced back following the scratch and maintained a plus-13 rating through November. The defensive partners later changed after Stephane Robidas underwent shoulder surgery in November. Although the team maintained a 12–9–3 record, they were 7–3–1 when Goligoski and Trevor Daley were paired together. Although this was short-lived, as Daley suffered a high ankle sprain in early December, Goligoski continued to see his ice time grow. Once Daley returned, Goligoski upped his scoring abilities and together they quickly set new career highs. Goligoski tallied 28 points over his final 40 games while Daley had 13 points over his final 40 games. From December 3 through April, Goligoski averaged .64 points per game and registered 32 points through 50 games. He finished the regular season third in team scoring behind Benn and Seguin with 42 points while also leading the team in ice time.

Prior to the start of the 2015–16 season, Goligoski was named an alternate captain alongside Vernon Fiddler and captain Jamie Benn.

==== Arizona Coyotes ====
On June 16, 2016, the Stars traded Goligoski's rights to the Arizona Coyotes in exchange for a fifth-round pick in the 2016 NHL entry draft. The Coyotes had 30 days to sign him before he automatically became an unrestricted free agent. Goligoski was eventually signed before the exclusivity window closed, agreeing to a five-year contract with the Coyotes on June 21. Longtime Coyotes forward Shane Doan later specifically mentioned Goligoski as one of the reasons he decided to return to the team. Goligoski, Connor Murphy, and Oliver Ekman-Larsson were expected to be the Coyotes defensive core for the 2016–17 season. However, Goligoski and the Coyots struggled at the start of the season, with the defenceman tallying six assists in 11 games while the team maintained a 4–7–0 record. The Coyotes eventually improved to a 9–13–0 record while Goligoski tallied his first goal with the team to end their three-game losing skid on December 10. Goligoski and teammate Luke Schenn later played in their 600th career NHL game in a loss to the Vancouver Canucks on January 4, 2017. By April, Goligoski had tallied six goals and 28 assists for 34 points through 79 games to tie for fourth on the team in points.

During the 2017 offseason, the Coyotes traded for Jason Demers who was expected to man the second defensive pairing alongside Goligoski during the 2017–18 NHL season. Goligoski and the Coyotes started the 2017–18 season on a losing streak, going 0–10–1 in their first 11 games. Goligoski snapped this streak by scoring in overtime on October 30, 2017, to secure the 4–3 win over the Philadelphia Flyers. He later scored another game-winning goal in his 700th NHL game to lift the Coyotes to a 2–1 win over the San Jose Sharks on February 14, 2018. At the time, Goligoski had collected three goals and seven points through eight games to match the longest points streak of his career. By early March, he was tied for fourth in team scoring with 30 points and first with 112 blocked shots. He later sat out of the Coyotes three-game road trip in order to accompany his wife while she gave birth to their second child. He returned to the Coyotes lineup on March 11 where he skated a team-high 21:39 and blocked two shots in their 1–0 win over the Canucks.

Goligoski's third season with the Coyotes proved to be one of his least productive as he tallied 27 points, his lowest total for a full season in his career. Goligoski later explained that during the month of December, he had begun to experience burnout and "lost his passion for hockey." Goligoski scored the first goal by an Arizona defenseman on October 26, 2018, while the Coyotes began the 2017–18 NHL season with a 4–5–0 record. The team continued to improve throughout October and by the end of the month, they were tied with the New Jersey Devils for the fewest goals allowed and tied for fourth for fewest goals per game. After suffering a lower-body injury during a game against the Vegas Golden Knights in mid-November, Goligoski missed five games before rejoining the team for a 5–4 loss to the Flyers on November 8. He missed one game in January due to an undisclosed illness and half of another in February due to an upper body injury. Although the Coyotes again failed to qualify for the Stanley Cup playoffs, they improved to 86 points overall which was 16 more than the previous season.

Goligoski returned to the Coyotes for the 2019–20 NHL season that was unexpectedly cut short due to the COVID-19 pandemic. He was given more responsibility on the ice during the season following an injury to Niklas Hjalmarsson and worked with the Coyote's new assistant coach Phil Housley to improve his efforts on the power play. With his assistance, the Coyotes quickly improved throughout November and tied the second-longest intra-division point streak in franchise history. Through this, Goligoski ranked second on the team in points with two goals and 14 assists. By mid-December, the Coyotes improved to 13–4–3 on the road and 13–4–0 in games following a loss. During a 3–2 loss to the Nashville Predators on December 23, Goligoski registered his fifth-multi point game of the season with two assists. When the NHL paused play due to the COVID-19 pandemic, Goligoski ranked second on the team in assists (28) and seventh in points (32) on pace to match his second-highest single season record.

When the 2020–21 NHL season began in January, Goligoski was named the teams' third alternate captain. He later played in his 900th career NHL game on March 22, 2021, against the Colorado Avalanche.

==== Minnesota Wild ====
Concluding his five-year deal with the Coyotes, Goligoski left as a free agent and extended his career by agreeing to a one-year, $5 million contract with the Minnesota Wild on July 28, 2021. He recorded three assists in six games before missing three games due to an upper-body injury. His fourth assist of the season, and 350th of his NHL career, came in a 5–4 shootout win over the Pittsburgh Penguins on November 7. In the nine games following his return to the lineup, Goligoski averaged a point per game, with one goal and eight assists. On November 13, he was fined $5,000 for high-sticking Seattle Kraken forward Jordan Eberle during a game. He missed five more games in January due to the NHL's COVID-19 protocol but recorded two shots and five blocked shots in 21:38 of ice time in his return on January 17. By March, Goligoski had tallied two goals and 26 assists for 28 points through 58 games. He also ranked fourth among NHL defensemen and seventh in the NHL in plus/minus rating. As a result of his outstanding play, Goligoski signed a two-year, $4 million contract extension with the Wild on March 30, 2022. Goligoski and the Wild qualified for the 2022 Stanley Cup playoffs where they faced off against the St. Louis Blues in the Western Conference First Round. After a loss in game one, coach Evason replaced Dmitry Kulikov with Goligoski for game two.

Following the 2023–24 season, Goligoski announced his retirement from hockey.

== Personal life ==
Goligoski and his wife Amanda have three children together.

== Career statistics ==
=== Regular season and playoffs ===
| | | | Regular season | | | | | Playoffs |
| Season | Team | League | GP | G | A | Pts | PIM | GP | G | A | Pts | PIM |
|---|---|---|---|---|---|---|---|---|---|---|---|---|
| 2002–03 | Grand Rapids High School | HSMN | 28 | 14 | 20 | 34 | 22 | — | — | — | — | — |
| 2002–03 | River City Lancers | USHL | 10 | 0 | 1 | 1 | 0 | 1 | 0 | 0 | 0 | 0 |
| 2003–04 | Grand Rapids High School | HSMN | 26 | 25 | 31 | 56 | 16 | — | — | — | — | — |
| 2003–04 | Sioux Falls Stampede | USHL | 10 | 0 | 2 | 2 | 6 | — | — | — | — | — |
| 2004–05 | University of Minnesota | WCHA | 32 | 5 | 15 | 20 | 44 | — | — | — | — | — |
| 2005–06 | University of Minnesota | WCHA | 41 | 11 | 28 | 39 | 63 | — | — | — | — | — |
| 2006–07 | University of Minnesota | WCHA | 44 | 9 | 30 | 39 | 51 | — | — | — | — | — |
| 2007–08 | Wilkes–Barre/Scranton Penguins | AHL | 70 | 10 | 28 | 38 | 53 | 23 | 4 | 24 | 28 | 18 |
| 2007–08 | Pittsburgh Penguins | NHL | 3 | 0 | 2 | 2 | 2 | — | — | — | — | — |
| 2008–09 | Pittsburgh Penguins | NHL | 45 | 6 | 14 | 20 | 16 | 2 | 0 | 1 | 1 | 0 |
| 2008–09 | Wilkes–Barre/Scranton Penguins | AHL | 26 | 2 | 16 | 18 | 16 | — | — | — | — | — |
| 2009–10 | Pittsburgh Penguins | NHL | 69 | 8 | 29 | 37 | 22 | 13 | 2 | 7 | 9 | 2 |
| 2010–11 | Pittsburgh Penguins | NHL | 60 | 9 | 22 | 31 | 28 | — | — | — | — | — |
| 2010–11 | Dallas Stars | NHL | 23 | 5 | 10 | 15 | 12 | — | — | — | — | — |
| 2011–12 | Dallas Stars | NHL | 71 | 9 | 21 | 30 | 16 | — | — | — | — | — |
| 2012–13 | Dallas Stars | NHL | 47 | 3 | 24 | 27 | 18 | — | — | — | — | — |
| 2013–14 | Dallas Stars | NHL | 81 | 6 | 36 | 42 | 28 | 6 | 1 | 2 | 3 | 8 |
| 2014–15 | Dallas Stars | NHL | 81 | 4 | 32 | 36 | 24 | — | — | — | — | — |
| 2015–16 | Dallas Stars | NHL | 82 | 5 | 32 | 37 | 34 | 13 | 4 | 3 | 7 | 6 |
| 2016–17 | Arizona Coyotes | NHL | 82 | 6 | 30 | 36 | 28 | — | — | — | — | — |
| 2017–18 | Arizona Coyotes | NHL | 78 | 12 | 23 | 35 | 26 | — | — | — | — | — |
| 2018–19 | Arizona Coyotes | NHL | 76 | 3 | 24 | 27 | 16 | — | — | — | — | — |
| 2019–20 | Arizona Coyotes | NHL | 70 | 4 | 28 | 32 | 24 | 9 | 0 | 0 | 0 | 2 |
| 2020–21 | Arizona Coyotes | NHL | 56 | 3 | 19 | 22 | 14 | — | — | — | — | — |
| 2021–22 | Minnesota Wild | NHL | 72 | 2 | 28 | 30 | 34 | 4 | 0 | 0 | 0 | 2 |
| 2022–23 | Minnesota Wild | NHL | 46 | 2 | 4 | 6 | 16 | — | — | — | — | — |
| 2023–24 | Minnesota Wild | NHL | 36 | 0 | 10 | 10 | 18 | — | — | — | — | — |
| NHL totals | | | 1,078 | 87 | 388 | 475 | 376 | 47 | 7 | 14 | 21 | 20 |

=== International ===
| Year | Team | Event | Result | GP | G | A | Pts | PIM |
|---|---|---|---|---|---|---|---|---|
| 2005 | United States | WJC | 4th | 7 | 0 | 1 | 1 | 2 |
| 2012 | United States | WC | 7th | 8 | 1 | 4 | 5 | 2 |
| Junior totals | | | | 7 | 0 | 1 | 1 | 2 |
| Senior totals | | | | 8 | 1 | 4 | 5 | 2 |

== Awards and honours ==
| Award | Year |
|---|---|
College
| All-WCHA Rookie Team | 2005 |
| All-WCHA Second Team | 2006 |
| All-WCHA First Team | 2007 |
| AHCA West First-Team All-American | 2007 |
NHL
| Stanley Cup (Pittsburgh Penguins) | 2009 |

Awards and achievements
| Preceded by Matt Carle | WCHA Defensive Player of the Year; 2006–07 | Succeeded by Jack Hillen |
