= 2009 Stanley Cup Final =

2009 ice hockey championship series

	1	2	3	4	5	6	7	Total
Pittsburgh Penguins	1	1	4	4	0	2	2	4
Detroit Red Wings	3	3	2	2	5	1	1	3
- Location(s): Pittsburgh: Mellon Arena (3, 4, 6); Detroit: Joe Louis Arena (1, 2, 5, 7)
- Coaches: Pittsburgh: Dan Bylsma; Detroit: Mike Babcock
- Captains: Pittsburgh: Sidney Crosby; Detroit: Nicklas Lidstrom
- National anthems: Pittsburgh: Jeff Jimerson; Detroit: Karen Newman
- Referees: Paul Devorski (1, 3, 5, 7); Dennis LaRue (1, 3, 5); Bill McCreary (2, 4, 6, 7); Marc Joannette (2, 4, 6)
- Dates: May 30 – June 12, 2009
- MVP: Evgeni Malkin (Penguins)
- Series-winning goal: Maxime Talbot (10:07, second)
- Hall of Famers: Red Wings: Chris Chelios (2013; did not play); Pavel Datsyuk (2024); Marian Hossa (2020); Nicklas Lidstrom (2015); Officials: Bill McCreary (2014)
- Networks: Canada: (English): CBC (French): RDS; United States: (English): NBC (1–2, 5–7), Versus (3–4)
- Announcers: (CBC) Jim Hughson and Craig Simpson (RDS) Pierre Houde and Benoit Brunet (NBC/Versus) Mike Emrick and Eddie Olczyk (NHL International) Dave Strader and Joe Micheletti

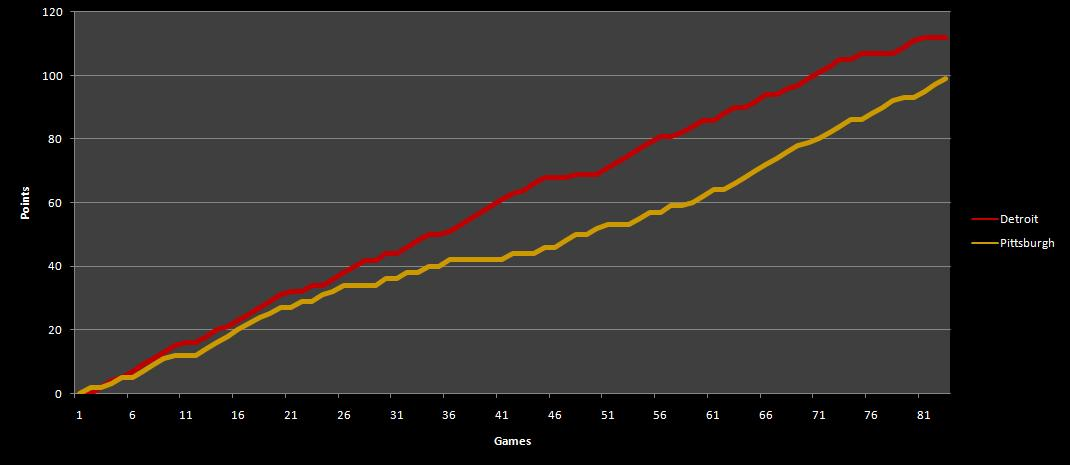
A graph comparing the teams' points throughout the regular season.

The 2009 Stanley Cup Final was the championship series of the National Hockey League's (NHL) 2008–09 season, and the culmination of the 2009 Stanley Cup playoffs. It was contested between the Eastern Conference champion Pittsburgh Penguins and the Western Conference and defending Stanley Cup champion Detroit Red Wings. It was Detroit's 24th appearance in the Finals and Pittsburgh's fourth appearance in the Finals. This was a rematch of the previous year's Stanley Cup Final where Detroit had defeated Pittsburgh in six games. This time, the Penguins defeated the Red Wings in seven games to win their first Stanley Cup title since 1992 and their third overall. Until 2025, this was the last time that the same two teams made it to the Stanley Cup Final in back to back years.

Pittsburgh's Evgeni Malkin won the Conn Smythe Trophy as the Most Valuable Player of the 2009 playoffs, becoming the first Russian-born player to win the trophy. Until 2021, this was the last time the Finals were played entirely in the Eastern Time Zone. Since the 2013 realignment, it is impossible for both finalists to be from the Eastern Time Zone as every team that is based in that time zone is in the same conference. The lone exception to this occurred during the 2020–21 NHL season when the league temporarily realigned for one season due to the cross-border travel restrictions caused by the COVID-19 pandemic.

== Road to Finals ==
=== Detroit Red Wings ===
Entering the 2008–09 season as the Stanley Cup Champions, the Detroit Red Wings signed head coach Mike Babcock to three-year contract extension. Marian Hossa signed with the Red Wings after turning down a $49 million offer from the Penguins, whom he played for throughout the 2007–08 playoffs. The Red Wings also signed Ty Conklin, who had played for the Penguins throughout the 2007–08 season.

The Red Wings won the Central Division title with 112 points before defeating the Columbus Blue Jackets 4–0, rival Anaheim Ducks 4–3, and then-division rival Chicago Blackhawks 4–1 to advance to the Stanley Cup Final for the sixth time in the past 14 seasons.

=== Pittsburgh Penguins ===
The Pittsburgh Penguins were the reigning Eastern Conference Champions. After playing 57 games of the 2008–09 season, the Pittsburgh Penguins had a record of 27–25–5 and were five points out of playoff position. The organization fired head coach Michel Therrien and replaced him with Dan Bylsma, head coach of the organization's American Hockey League affiliate in Wilkes-Barre. Under Bylsma, the team went 18–3–4, including 10–1–2 in March, losing one home game. Before the trade deadline, the Penguins acquired Chris Kunitz and Bill Guerin from the Anaheim Ducks and the New York Islanders respectively.

The Penguins qualified for the playoffs for their third consecutive season. They did not repeat as champions of the Atlantic Division, but earned the fourth seed in the Eastern Conference with 99 points. They began the 2009 Stanley Cup playoffs on April 15 against their cross-state rival Philadelphia Flyers. They beat the Flyers 4–2, Washington Capitals 4–3, and Carolina Hurricanes 4–0 to earn a second-straight berth in the Stanley Cup Final.

== Game summaries ==
Number in parentheses represents the player's total in goals or assists to that point of the entire four rounds of the playoffs

=== Game one ===
May 30	Pittsburgh Penguins	1–3	Detroit Red Wings	Joe Louis Arena	Recap

The Red Wings took game one, 3–1, as three different Detroit players scored goals off of unusual bounces. The first period featured back and forth action, with each team having a variety of chances. Detroit scored the first goal of the game at 13:38 into the first period when Brad Stuart's shot missed wide left, bounced off the end boards, and then deflected off the back of Pittsburgh goaltender Marc-Andre Fleury's leg into the net. The Penguins tied the game at 18:37 when Red Wings goaltender Chris Osgood mishandled a shot by Evgeni Malkin, allowing Ruslan Fedotenko to score. Malkin gained the initial opportunity after forcing defenceman Stuart into a turnover. The Penguins dominated the early portion of the second period, but Osgood kept the game even, including when he bailed his team out by stopping Malkin on a breakaway. The Red Wings bounced back and went ahead at 19:02 of the period after Brian Rafalski's shot rebounded off the end boards to Johan Franzen, who banked a shot off Fleury and into the net. Detroit's third goal of the game came at 2:46 of the third period when, after a save by Fleury on Ville Leino, the puck bounced high into the air and was swatted by Detroit rookie Justin Abdelkader from midair to his stick. Abdelkader then went around Pittsburgh's Jordan Staal (who had lost sight of the puck) and shot it above Fleury. Only three total penalties were called in the game, two on Detroit and one on Pittsburgh, but neither team could take advantage on their respective power plays as Osgood stopped 31 out of 32 shots while Fleury stopped 27 out of 30.

Scoring summary
Period	Team	Goal	Assist(s)	Time	Score
1st	DET	Brad Stuart (2)	Unassisted	13:38	1–0 DET
1st	PIT	Ruslan Fedotenko (7)	Evgeni Malkin (17)	18:37	1–1
2nd	DET	Johan Franzen (11)	Brian Rafalski (7), Henrik Zetterberg (10)	19:02	2–1 DET
3rd	DET	Justin Abdelkader (1)	Ville Leino (1)	2:46	3–1 DET
Penalty summary
Period	Team	Player	Penalty	Time	PIM
1st	None				
2nd	DET	Brett Lebda	Slashing	4:38	2:00
2nd	DET	Mikael Samuelsson	Holding	7:05	2:00
2nd	PIT	Craig Adams	Hooking	13:44	2:00
3rd	None				

Shots by period
Team	1	2	3	Total
PIT	7	13	12	32
DET	11	11	8	30

=== Game two ===
May 31	Pittsburgh Penguins	1–3	Detroit Red Wings	Joe Louis Arena	Recap

Game two was another 3–1 victory for Detroit. Pittsburgh started out the game strong, setting up numerous chances from behind the net that were stopped by Chris Osgood. The Penguins then struck first at 16:50 of the opening period. After the Red Wings' Niklas Kronwall was sent to the penalty box for cross checking, Evgeni Malkin fired from the slot, and a scramble in front of the net ensued after Osgood gave up a rebound. The puck eventually came to Malkin for a second crack, and the shot was inadvertently deflected by Brad Stuart into his own net. Detroit took over in the second period, dominating in shots and benefiting from some luck, such as when Bill Guerin's wrist shot hit the inside of the post but stayed out of the net. Jonathan Ericsson tied the game at 4:21 of the second period, moments after the Penguins were forced to ice the puck after a long shift. Pittsburgh promptly lost the ensuing faceoff in their zone, allowing Ericsson to score from the point. Then at 10:29, the Red Wings went ahead after Valtteri Filppula was able to backhand a shot from a difficult angle into the net. Filppula scored after Fleury had stopped both Tomas Holmstrom and Marian Hossa, but could not hold the rebounds.

At 1:39 of the third period, Sidney Crosby peeled out of the corner and fired a shot that bounced off the post and rolled along the Detroit goal line. The play was reviewed by video replay, but the ruling on the ice was upheld as a no goal. Then at 2:47, Justin Abdelkader gave the Red Wings their third goal of the game, as he moved in slowly against the Pittsburgh defence and blasted a shot that caught Marc-Andre Fleury off guard as it landed in the net. Tensions flared up near the end of the game at 19:41 of the third period. Maxime Talbot was called for slashing, which eventually led to a fight between Malkin and Detroit's Henrik Zetterberg. Malkin received an instigator penalty and a misconduct penalty, but was not suspended by the league for the incident, despite Rule 47.22 (now Rule 46.21) of the NHL rulebook automatically imposing the suspension.

Scoring summary
Period	Team	Goal	Assist(s)	Time	Score
1st	PIT	Evgeni Malkin (13) – pp	Kris Letang (7), Bill Guerin (8)	16:50	1–0 PIT
2nd	DET	Jonathan Ericsson (3)	Jiri Hudler (6), Darren Helm (1)	4:21	1–1
2nd	DET	Valtteri Filppula (2)	Tomas Holmstrom (4) and Marian Hossa (7)	10:29	2–1 DET
3rd	DET	Justin Abdelkader (2)	Tomas Holmstrom (5) and Marian Hossa (8)	2:47	3–1 DET
Penalty summary
Period	Team	Player	Penalty	Time	PIM
1st	DET	Niklas Kronwall	Cross Checking	16:08	2:00
2nd	PIT	Evgeni Malkin	Interference	8:15	2:00
3rd	PIT	Maxime Talbot	Slashing	19:41	2:00
3rd	PIT	Evgeni Malkin	Fighting – major	19:41	5:00
3rd	DET	Henrik Zetterberg	Fighting – major	19:41	5:00
3rd	PIT	Evgeni Malkin	Instigator	19:41	2:00
3rd	PIT	Evgeni Malkin	Misconduct	19:41	10:00

Shots by period
Team	1	2	3	Total
PIT	12	9	12	33
DET	7	16	3	26

=== Game three ===
June 2	Detroit Red Wings	2–4	Pittsburgh Penguins	Mellon Arena	Recap

The Penguins won game three, 4–2, cutting their deficit in the series in half. Pittsburgh got off to a strong offensive start and scored first at 4:48 of the opening period when Evgeni Malkin set up Maxime Talbot, who fired a one-timed snapshot. Detroit answered less than two minutes later with a Henrik Zetterberg goal at 6:19 in the period. Zetterberg scored on a rebound after Ville Leino's wrap-around attempt was stopped by Marc-Andre Fleury. After Pittsburgh's Brooks Orpik was called for interference, Johan Franzen responding by scoring a goal at 11:33 with under ten seconds left in the penalty. Franzen's score was a one-timer that resulted after Zetterberg fed him a pass around the goal crease. While Detroit dominated the middle of the first period, at one point firing nine straight shots, the Penguins caught a break when the officials missed a penalty for too many men when Pittsburgh had inadvertently created their own powerplay, and played with six men for nearly 30 seconds. Pittsburgh then used a late holding call on Daniel Cleary to set up a game-tying power play goal. Defenceman Kris Letang fanned on a one-time attempt as he took a pass from Malkin, but regained control of the puck and fired a wrist shot into the net.

The score remained unchanged through the second period, although Detroit had numerous scoring chances. The Penguins' Fleury stopped 16 Detroit shots in the frame, and caught a break as Mikael Samuelsson hit the post on a breakaway. The Penguins came out with strong defence in the third period, and the Detroit offence sputtered, at one point going over ten minutes without a shot. Midway through the third period, the Penguins earned a power play opportunity after Jonathan Ericsson was called for interference. At 10:29, Sergei Gonchar drilled a slapshot from near the blue line, which sailed through traffic and beat a screened Chris Osgood to give the Penguins the lead. Detroit could not mount a late surge with the extra attacker on the ice, and Talbot added an empty net goal at 19:03 for his second of the game to seal the victory.

Scoring summary
Period	Team	Goal	Assist(s)	Time	Score
1st	PIT	Maxime Talbot (5)	Evgeni Malkin (18), Kris Letang (8)	4:48	1–0 PIT
1st	DET	Henrik Zetterberg (10)	Ville Leino (2), Johan Franzen (10)	6:19	1–1
1st	DET	Johan Franzen (12) – pp	Henrik Zetterberg (11), Niklas Kronwall (7)	11:33	2–1 DET
1st	PIT	Kris Letang (4) – pp	Evgeni Malkin (19), Sergei Gonchar (11)	15:57	2–2
2nd	None				
3rd	PIT	Sergei Gonchar (3) – pp	Evgeni Malkin (20), Sidney Crosby (15)	10:29	3–2 PIT
3rd	PIT	Maxime Talbot (6) – en	Ruslan Fedotenko (6)	19:03	4–2 PIT
Penalty summary
Period	Team	Player	Penalty	Time	PIM
1st	PIT	Brooks Orpik	Interference	9:42	2:00
1st	DET	Daniel Cleary	Holding	14:46	2:00
1st	DET	Johan Franzen	Tripping	18:02	2:00
2nd	PIT	Miroslav Satan	Holding	15:35	2:00
3rd	DET	Jonathan Ericsson	Interference	9:46	2:00

Shots by period
Team	1	2	3	T
DET	12	14	3	29
PIT	7	4	10	21

=== Game four ===
June 4	Detroit Red Wings	2–4	Pittsburgh Penguins	Mellon Arena	Recap

The Penguins picked up a 4–2 win in game four, equalling their performance from the previous meeting. Detroit found themselves at an early disadvantage, as a tripping call on Niklas Kronwall gave Pittsburgh a power play just over a minute into the game. Evgeni Malkin scored with the man advantage at 2:39 to give the Penguins an early lead. The goal occurred after Chris Osgood stopped a Jordan Staal shot, then Kris Letang fired a rebound wide that was picked up by Malkin and deposited behind the outstretched goaltender. Detroit ended the first period on a relentless assault, but Marc-Andre Fleury held the fort in goal for Pittsburgh, including a sequence in which he stopped four Detroit shots seconds apart. On that shift, Fleury cancelled a Darren Helm wrap around attempt, stood up to stop Mikael Samuelsson's rebound one-timer, then stopped Daniel Cleary on two more rebound tries. With 19 shots in the period, Detroit would eventually score at 18:19, after Helm forced Rob Scuderi into a turnover on a clearing attempt, then fired a wrist shot into the goal.

Detroit took the lead early in the second period, after Henrik Zetterberg passed from behind the net to Brad Stuart at the point. Stuart's slap shot at 0:46 beat a screened Fleury, but provided one of the few sparks for Detroit in a nightmarish period. After Brooks Orpik was called for tripping, it was the Penguins who picked up great scoring opportunities during the Detroit power play. First, Osgood stopped Malkin on a breakaway. However, he was not able to keep Staal from scoring shorthanded. At 8:35, Staal lit the lamp after dragging the puck around Brian Rafalski by using his long reach. Just under two minutes later, Sidney Crosby finally scored his first goal of the series. Malkin stripped Brad Stuart, who had just mishandled a pass, and started a two-on-one with Crosby, who took the pass at 10:34 and shoved it into the net. At 14:12 in the period, Tyler Kennedy scored to extend the Pittsburgh lead. The play began when Kennedy beat Henrik Zetterberg to the puck on the forecheck. Chris Kunitz then took the puck and fed a pass to Crosby, who one-touched it to Kennedy for the goal, as Osgood was caught moving side-to-side. The third period featured several good chances by each team, but neither team was able to score and the game ended with a tied series.

Scoring summary
Period	Team	Goal	Assist(s)	Time	Score
1st	PIT	Evgeni Malkin (14) – pp	Kris Letang (9), Jordan Staal (5)	2:39	1–0 PIT
1st	DET	Darren Helm (4)	Unassisted	18:19	1–1
2nd	DET	Brad Stuart (3)	Henrik Zetterberg (12), Brian Rafalski (8)	0:46	2–1 DET
2nd	PIT	Jordan Staal (3) – sh	Maxime Talbot (4), Mark Eaton (3)	8:35	2–2
2nd	PIT	Sidney Crosby (15)	Evgeni Malkin (21)	10:34	3–2 PIT
2nd	PIT	Tyler Kennedy (4)	Sidney Crosby (16), Chris Kunitz (12)	14:12	4–2 PIT
3rd	None				
Penalty summary
Period	Team	Player	Penalty	Time	PIM
1st	DET	Niklas Kronwall	Tripping	1:12	2:00
1st	PIT	Mark Eaton	Cross-checking	11:09	2:00
1st	DET	Jonathan Ericsson	High-sticking	16:27	2:00
1st	PIT	Bill Guerin	High-sticking	16:37	2:00
2nd	PIT	Evgeni Malkin	Hooking	5:44	2:00
2nd	PIT	Brooks Orpik	Tripping	7:43	2:00
3rd	DET	Niklas Kronwall	Hooking	8:27	2:00
3rd	DET	Daniel Cleary	Roughing	20:00	2:00
3rd	PIT	Brooks Orpik	Roughing	20:00	2:00

Shots by period
Team	1	2	3	T
DET	19	9	11	39
PIT	11	11	9	31

=== Game five ===
June 6	Pittsburgh Penguins	0–5	Detroit Red Wings	Joe Louis Arena	Recap

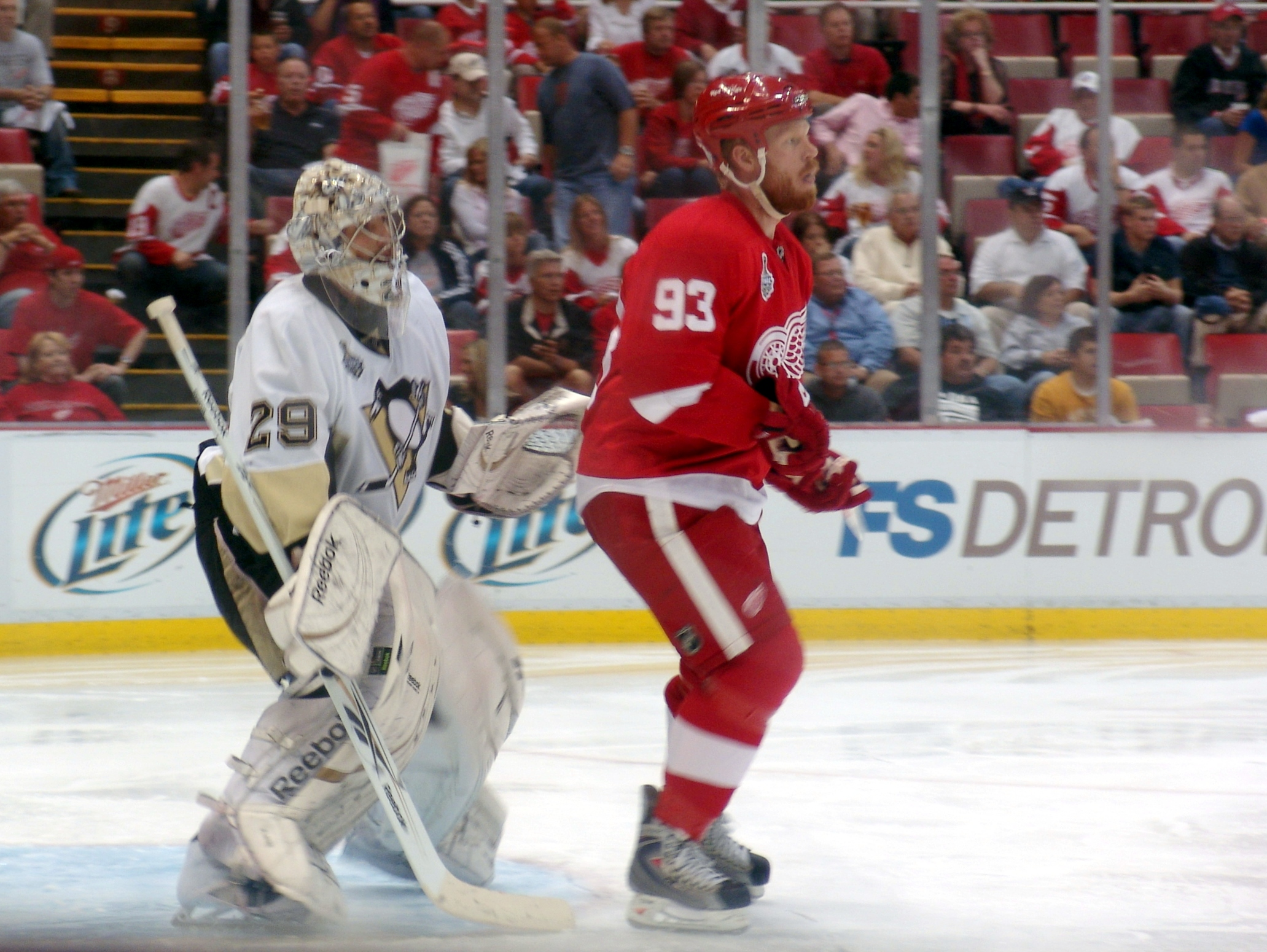
Fleury is screened by Franzen during game five

Detroit gained a huge boost in game five, as star two-way player Pavel Datsyuk played for the first time in the series after returning from a foot injury. The Penguins were the team that began the match with energy, dominating the first five minutes, and producing a variety of chances from the Evgeni Malkin–Ruslan Fedotenko–Maxime Talbot line. However, the Red Wings rallied around a rejuvenated Datsyuk to take over the game midway through the period. Datsuyk's skating allowed Detroit to score at 13:32 of the period, as he fed a pass to Daniel Cleary during a three-on-three transition play. Cleary used Penguins' defenceman Brooks Orpik as a screen as he shot the puck past goaltender Marc-Andre Fleury. The Penguins began to unravel in the second period, committing five minor penalties in the frame. This undisciplined hockey allowed Detroit to score three power play goals and one marker that occurred seconds after a penalty had expired.

At 1:44 of the second, the Red Wings scored their second goal. On the final seconds of a power play, Fleury made a sprawling save on Datsuyk, the puck was cleared, and the penalty expired. However, as the Penguins attempted to make a line change, goaltender Chris Osgood fed a long pass for Detroit to Marian Hossa, who slipped a pass into the slot, enabling a streaking Valtteri Filppula to score on the backhand. Three straight penalty calls on Pittsburgh would then lead to Red Wing scores. A slashing minor on Sergei Gonchar eventually allowed a high wrist shot by Niklas Kronwall at 8:35 to find the back of the net. Kronwall scored after pinching into the corner and playing in a forward position. He then took a pass from Johan Franzen and patiently waited for Fleury to go down before lifting the puck. An elbowing penalty on Evgeni Malkin led to a Brian Rafalski goal at 11:34, which saw the defenceman take a pass from Datsyuk and score on a wrist shot from the right circle. A Chris Kunitz roughing penalty set up Henrik Zetterberg. At 15:40, Zetterberg took a shot-pass from Jiri Hudler and peeled to the front of the net to deposit the puck over Fleury's glove. After giving up the fifth goal, Fleury was replaced by Mathieu Garon, and the Penguins committed two more penalties in the second to give Detroit a two-man advantage on which they did not convert. The third period was mostly uneventful and the score remained 5–0 until the end of the game.

Scoring summary
Period	Team	Goal	Assist(s)	Time	Score
1st	DET	Daniel Cleary (9)	Pavel Datsyuk (7), Brian Rafalski (9)	13:32	1–0 DET
2nd	DET	Valtteri Filppula (3)	Marian Hossa (9), Chris Osgood (1)	1:44	2–0 DET
2nd	DET	Niklas Kronwall (2) – pp	Johan Franzen (11), Henrik Zetterberg (13)	8:35	3–0 DET
2nd	DET	Brian Rafalski (3) – pp	Pavel Datsyuk (8), Nicklas Lidstrom (10)	11:34	4–0 DET
2nd	DET	Henrik Zetterberg (11) – pp	Jiri Hudler (7), Mikael Samuelsson (5)	15:40	5–0 DET
3rd	None				
Penalty summary
Period	Team	Player	Penalty	Time	PIM
1st	DET	Niklas Kronwall	Tripping	7:16	2:00
1st	PIT	Chris Kunitz	Goaltender Interference	19:39	2:00
2nd	PIT	Sergei Gonchar	Slashing	5:53	2:00
2nd	PIT	Evgeni Malkin	Elbowing	6:48	2:00
2nd	PIT	Chris Kunitz	Roughing	13:50	2:00
2nd	PIT	Sidney Crosby	Slashing	17:37	2:00
2nd	PIT	Maxime Talbot	Slashing	17:57	2:00
3rd	DET	Marian Hossa	Roughing	1:53	2:00
3rd	PIT	Evgeni Malkin	Hooking	7:14	2:00
3rd	PIT	Pascal Dupuis	High-sticking	15:50	2:00
3rd	PIT	Craig Adams	Misconduct	15:50	10:00
3rd	PIT	Evgeni Malkin	Cross Checking	18:08	2:00
3rd	PIT	Matt Cooke	Misconduct	18:08	10:00
3rd	DET	Brett Lebda	Misconduct	18:08	10:00
3rd	PIT	Maxime Talbot	Misconduct	18:08	10:00

Shots by period
Team	1	2	3	Total
PIT	10	6	6	22
DET	8	15	6	29

=== Game six ===
June 9	Detroit Red Wings	1–2	Pittsburgh Penguins	Mellon Arena	Recap

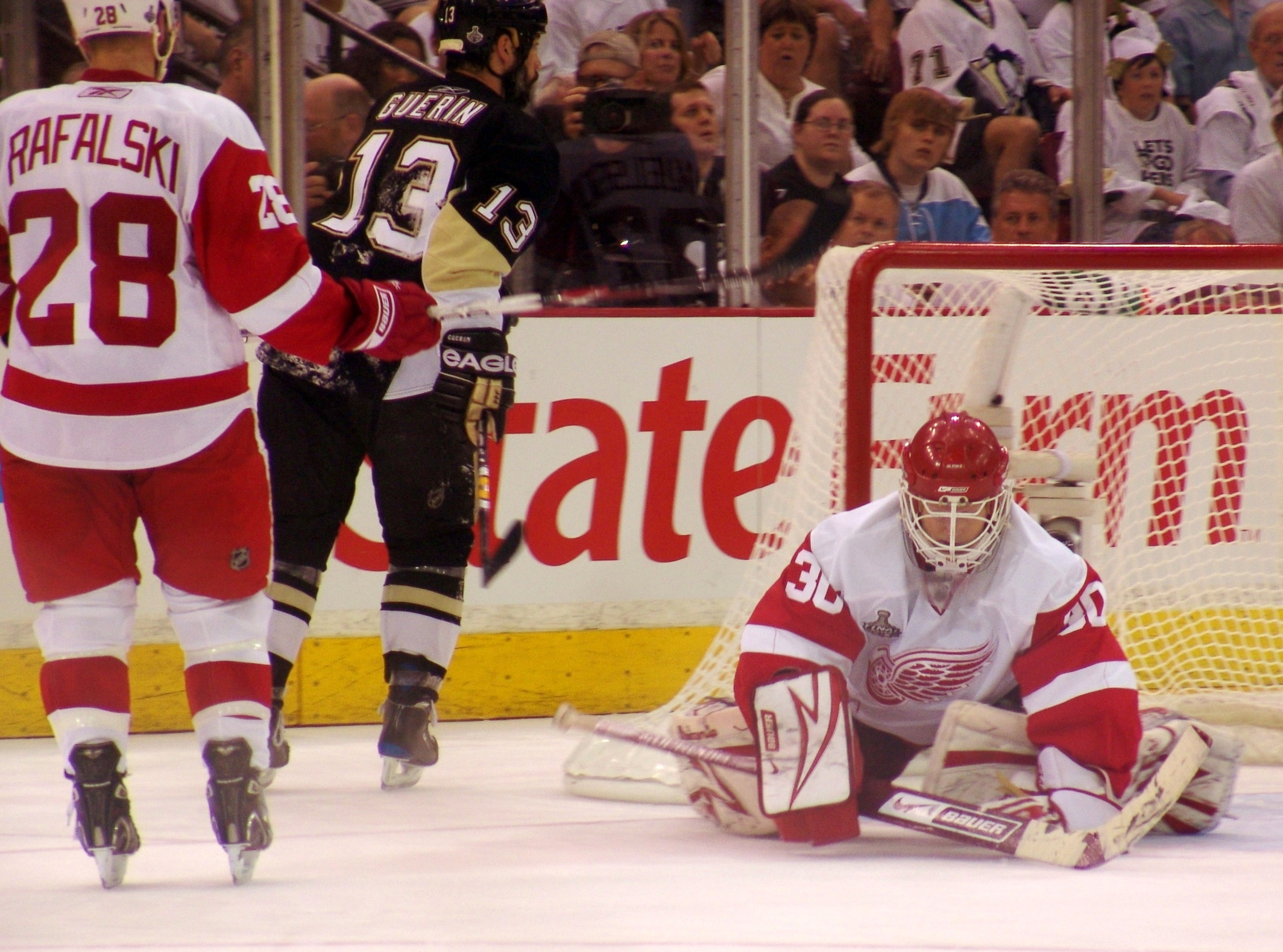
Osgood makes a save in game six

The Penguins defeated the Red Wings in game six, 2–1, to force a seventh and deciding game of the finals. The first period featured strong defensive play by both teams. Pittsburgh goaltender Marc-Andre Fleury made a big early save as he stopped a one-timer by Henrik Zetterberg, who had just received a pass from Pavel Datsyuk on a two-on-one rush. Detroit's Chris Osgood equalled Fleury's early brilliance, as he stopped Sidney Crosby on two separate power plays, first by stuffing his attempt to jam home a puck in the crease, then by denying him on a rush through the slot in transition. After a scoreless first period, Jordan Staal scored Pittsburgh's first goal at 0:51 in the second. Tyler Kennedy chipped a puck away from Valtteri Filppula in the Detroit zone, then passed the puck to Staal to start a two-on-one break. Osgood stopped Staal's first shot by tipping it with his glove, before the rebound was deposited into the net.

Pittsburgh dominated the second period, but did not score again in the frame. They also caught a break as Zetterberg's forehand shot from the slot hit the post and was then held by Fleury as it ricochet off his back. Kennedy gave the Penguins their second goal at 5:35 of the third after gaining the puck by cycling behind Detroit's net with Maxime Talbot. Two Red Wing defenders went to Talbot, which gave Kennedy a clear lane to walk in front of the net and lift a shot high over Osgood. Kris Draper cut the Pittsburgh lead at 8:01, beating Marc-Andre Fleury on a wrist shot. The goal came after Jonathan Ericsson's slapshot was kicked aside and Draper was able to take the rebound and glide into scoring position. The Red Wings found their stride late in the game, but were thwarted on two late scoring chances. With 1:42 remaining, Daniel Cleary raced into the Penguins zone on a breakaway, but his shot was turned aside by Fleury. In the final thirty seconds, an unlikely hero stepped up for the Penguins. After Fleury stopped Datsyuk's shot, the puck came to the goal mouth, where Johan Franzen was ready to pounce. However, with Fleury out of position, Pittsburgh defenceman Rob Scuderi stepped in front of the loose puck and blocked three Franzen shots with his skates to preserve a win. This was the last ever Stanley Cup Final game played at Mellon Arena.

Scoring summary
Period	Team	Goal	Assist(s)	Time	Score
1st	None				
2nd	PIT	Jordan Staal (4)	Tyler Kennedy (4) Rob Scuderi (3)	0:51	1–0 PIT
3rd	PIT	Tyler Kennedy (5)	Maxime Talbot (5), Ruslan Fedotenko (7)	5:35	2–0 PIT
3rd	DET	Kris Draper (1)	Jonathan Ericsson (4), Nicklas Lidstrom (11)	8:01	2–1 PIT
Penalty summary
Period	Team	Player	Penalty	Time	PIM
1st	DET	Henrik Zetterberg	Goaltender interference	3:35	2:00
1st	DET	Valtteri Filppula	Tripping	13:29	2:00
2nd	None				
3rd	PIT	Evgeni Malkin	Cross-checking	9:18	2:00
3rd	PIT	Bill Guerin	High-sticking	12:40	2:00

Shots by period
Team	1	2	3	Total
DET	3	9	14	26
PIT	12	12	7	31

=== Game seven ===
June 12	Pittsburgh Penguins	2–1	Detroit Red Wings	Joe Louis Arena	Recap

External videos
- Game 7 Full replay (NHL International's feed) on the NHL's official YouTube channel

For the first time, the Penguins played a game seven in the Stanley Cup Final, while the Red Wings made their seventh appearance in the deciding game. Detroit had split their six previous appearances in game sevens. Their last Stanley Cup Final game seven was in 1964 where they lost against the Toronto Maple Leafs. Entering the contest, Red Wings head coach Mike Babcock joined Mike Keenan as the only men to coach a seventh game of the Stanley Cup Final with two different teams, having been with the Mighty Ducks of Anaheim when they lost to the New Jersey Devils in 2003.

The opening half of the first period featured tentative play by both teams but with Pittsburgh outperforming Detroit offensively in the frame. However, the Red Wings got the best scoring chance, as Kirk Maltby gained possession of a bouncing puck after a faceoff in the Penguins' zone. Maltby's shot was then stopped by the glove of goaltender Marc-Andre Fleury from point blank range. At 1:13 in the second period, Pittsburgh struck first, as Maxime Talbot scored following a turnover. The goal resulted after Brad Stuart attempted to clear the zone following a dump-in by Brooks Orpik into Detroit territory. Evgeni Malkin used his skates to block Stuart's pass, and the puck found its way to Talbot, who patiently waited to find a shooting lane behind goaltender Chris Osgood. Both teams gained chances through the middle of the period, with each goalie coming up strong. On one sequence, Brian Rafalski made a quick pass to Darren Helm in the left circle, where he was stopped by Fleury. As Rafalski set up for a rebound shot, he lost the puck to Pittsburgh's Matt Cooke, who was then stuffed on a breakaway attempt. Soon afterward, Penguins captain Sidney Crosby was crunched into the boards by Johan Franzen and sustained a knee injury. He would be healthy enough to play only one shift for the remainder of the game.

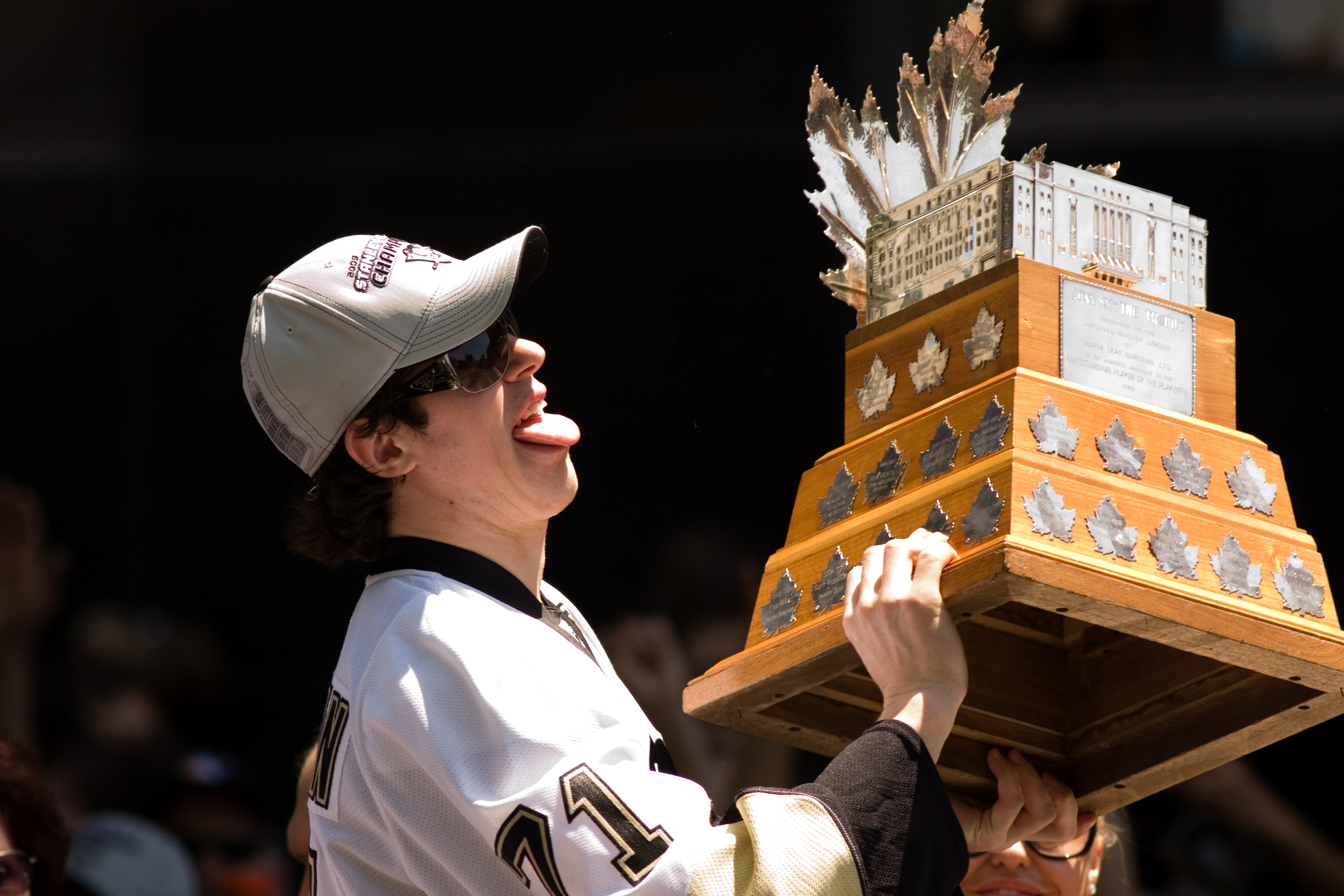
Malkin, during the Penguins' victory parade, became the first Russian player to win the Conn Smythe Trophy.

Talbot struck again at 10:07 in the period, as he curled the puck to fake a pass during a two-on-one break, then lifted it over Osgood's shoulder. The play began with Chris Kunitz splitting the Detroit defence with a pass in his own zone, allowing Talbot and Tyler Kennedy to move in on an odd man rush. The Penguins attempted to play conservatively in the third period and registered only one shot in the frame. At the same time, Detroit was able to sustain pressure on several occasions during the period. At 13:53, the Red Wings got on the board, as Jonathan Ericsson drilled a one-timed slapshot behind Fleury from near the blue line, after receiving a pass from Nicklas Lidstrom. Then, at 17:45, Detroit came within inches of pulling into a tie. However, Niklas Kronwall's wristshot from the right circle ricocheted off of Jordan Staal, hit the crossbar, then bounced away from any Red Wing skaters. Detroit gained one last chance on the final shift of the game. After stopping an initial Henrik Zetterberg shot from the right faceoff circle, the rebound came loose to Nicklas Lidstrom at the left faceoff circle, forcing Fleury to make a diving stop, considered one of the greatest saves in league history, with two seconds remaining to preserve the win and the championship. Pittsburgh's Evgeni Malkin was awarded the Conn Smythe Trophy after the game as the Most Valuable Player of the 2009 playoffs, becoming the first Russian-born player to win the trophy.

The Penguins became the first team since the 1971 Montreal Canadiens to win game seven of the Stanley Cup Final on the road. They were also the first road team to win game seven of a championship round in any major league sport since the Pittsburgh Pirates defeated the Baltimore Orioles to win the 1979 World Series. For the Red Wings, it was the first time that they lost in the Finals since 1995, when they were swept by the New Jersey Devils. It was also the only time that the visiting team won the Cup at Joe Louis Arena in the venue's history, and the Penguins became the first visiting team to win the Cup in Detroit since the Canadiens did so in 1966 at the now-demolished Olympia Stadium. They were also the first team to win the Stanley Cup without finishing first in a division during the regular season since the Devils in 2000. This was the last ever Stanley Cup Final game played at Joe Louis Arena.

Scoring summary
Period	Team	Goal	Assist(s)	Time	Score
1st	None				
2nd	PIT	Maxime Talbot (7)	Evgeni Malkin (20)	01:13	1–0 PIT
2nd	PIT	Maxime Talbot (8)	Chris Kunitz (13), Rob Scuderi (4)	10:07	2–0 PIT
3rd	DET	Jonathan Ericsson (4)	Nicklas Lidstrom (12), Jiri Hudler (8)	13:53	2–1 PIT
Penalty summary
Period	Team	Player	Penalty	Time	PIM
1st	DET	Brad Stuart	Slashing	11:24	2:00
2nd	PIT	Jordan Staal	Hooking	01:59	2:00
2nd	DET	Tomas Holmstrom	Holding	01:59	2:00
2nd	PIT	Hal Gill	Holding	06:16	2:00
3rd	PIT	Mark Eaton	Tripping	02:36	2:00

Shots by period
Team	1	2	3	Total
PIT	10	7	1	18
DET	6	11	8	25

== Officials ==
The following officials worked the 2009 Stanley Cup Final: (Bold-face indicates worked Game 7)

- Referees: Paul Devorski, Marc Joannette, Dennis Larue, Bill McCreary
- Linesmen: Derek Amell, Steve Miller, Jean Morin, Pierre Racicot

== Television coverage ==
In Canada, all games of the Finals were broadcast in English on the CBC and in French on the cable network RDS. CBC had a new broadcast team calling the Finals with Jim Hughson as play-by-play announcer, and Craig Simpson as colour commentator.

In the United States, this was the first time since 1999 that game one of the Cup Finals aired on over-the-air television instead of on cable: NBC broadcast the first two and final three games of the series, while Versus broadcast games three and four. The first two games of the series were played on consecutive nights due to NBC's scheduling, specifically to avoid putting a contest on the network during the debut week of The Tonight Show with Conan O'Brien on June 1–5. This was also done to help promote the game and keep the hockey viewership growing. Games four and six ended up going head-to-head with games one and three of the 2009 NBA Finals, respectively.

Game seven was the last major sporting event on analogue television in the United States, with the DTV transition finishing less than an hour-and-a-half after the game ended and just one hour after NBC coverage ended. NBC affiliates WDIV-TV in Detroit and WPXI in Pittsburgh – who months before the Stanley Cup playoffs began electing to keep their own respective analogue signals on until June 12, well past the original February 17 deadline – both remained on the air for game seven before cutting their analogue signals at 11:59 EDT.

=== Ratings ===
In the United States, with an average of eight million viewers, game seven was the most-watched NHL game in the United States since game six of the 1973 Stanley Cup Final.

In Canada, game seven drew an average of 3.529 million viewers to the CBC. However, it averaged 2.154 million viewers for the seven-game rematch, down 7% from the 2008 Finals.

== Records ==
The Red Wings attempted to become the first team to successfully defend a championship since they did it in 1998. The Red Wings were also the first defending Stanley Cup champions to reach the Finals since 2001, when the 2000 champions New Jersey Devils lost to the Colorado Avalanche.

The Penguins became the first team since the Edmonton Oilers in 1984 to win the Stanley Cup after having lost in the Finals the year before; it was also the first instance of a Stanley Cup Final rematch since then. They were the first team in major professional sports to win a game seven of the championship round on the road since the 1979 Pittsburgh Pirates of Major League Baseball. They also became the third team to win a game seven in the Stanley Cup Final as the visitor, the first since the Montreal Canadiens in 1971 (the Toronto Maple Leafs in 1945 being the other).

Seeded fourth in the Eastern Conference, the Penguins became the lowest-seeded team to win the Cup since the fifth-seeded New Jersey Devils in 1995 (who also beat the Red Wings), and tied for eighth overall in the NHL, they became (along with the 1991 Penguins and 1995 Devils), the only teams in the post-1967 expansion era to finish outside the top six overall and win the Cup. The last team to win a Stanley Cup with fewer than 100 points in the season was the 1997 Detroit Red Wings, with 94.

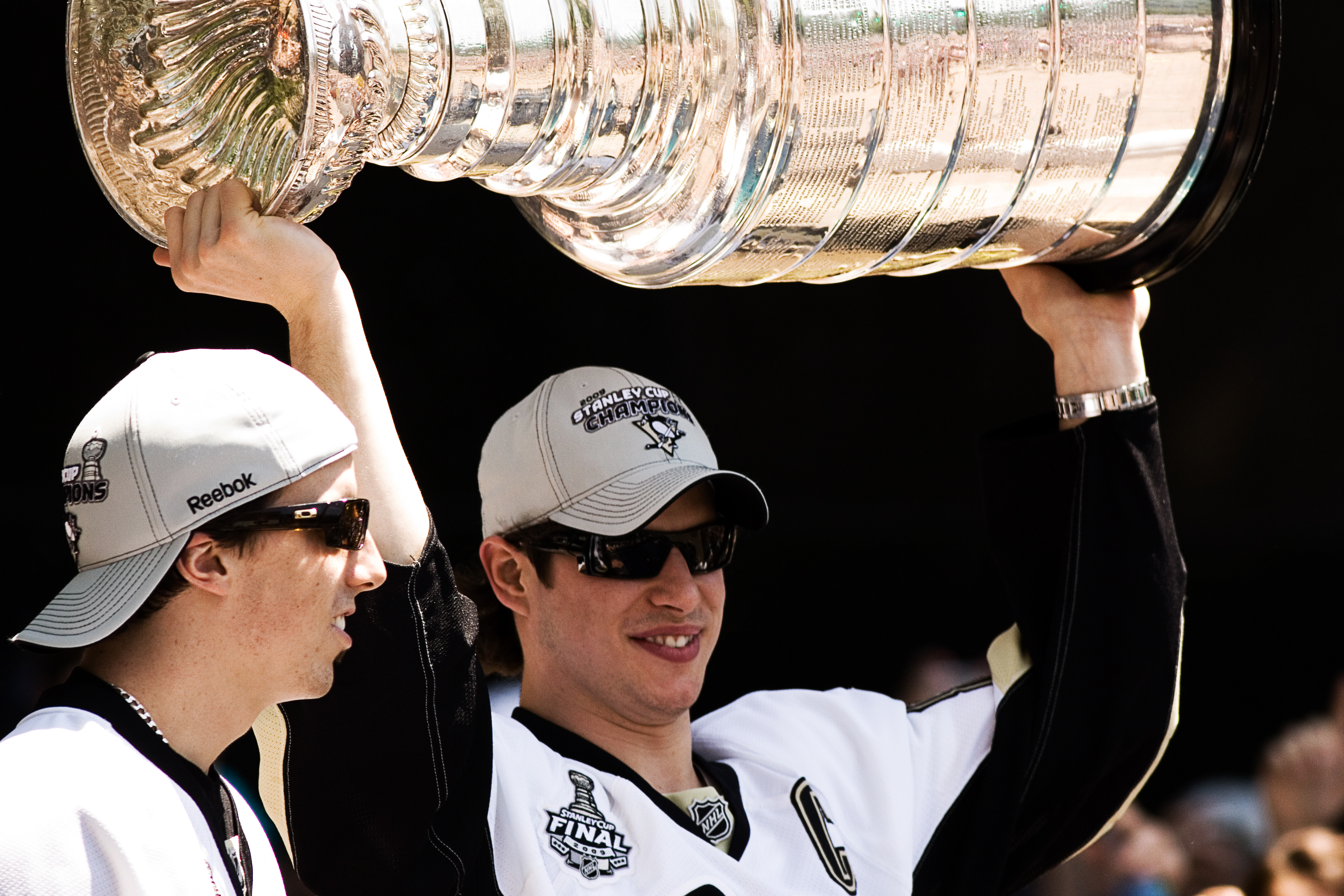
Crosby (right) and Fleury (left) with the Stanley Cup during the Penguins' victory parade. Pittsburgh became the first city to win a Super Bowl and Stanley Cup in the same year.

The Penguins' Cup victory, coupled with that of the Steelers in Super Bowl XLIII four months earlier, gave the city of Pittsburgh the distinction of being the only city to win a Super Bowl and the Stanley Cup in the same year. However, Detroit holds the distinction of being the first city to have NFL champions and NHL champions in the same city in the same year, 1952. Detroit sports fans also previously experienced a similar event in 1935 when the Tigers and Lions both won championships, and the Red Wings won the Stanley Cup in the 1935–36 season, a span of only 6 months and 4 days. The "City of Champions" gained multiple titles in the same year for the second time and first time in 30 years (the Pirates won the 1979 World Series in between the Steelers' victories in Super Bowl XIII in January 1979 and Super Bowl XIV in January 1980). It also gives the state of Pennsylvania three champions in the four major professional sports in a span of nine months, with the Philadelphia Phillies winning the World Series the previous October.

This was the second consecutive year that two American-based NHL teams competed for the championship, and the first time that two teams met in the Stanley Cup Final in consecutive seasons since the Edmonton Oilers and the New York Islanders did so in 1983 and 1984.

The first two games were played at Joe Louis Arena in Detroit on consecutive weekend nights—May 30 and 31—the first time that Finals games have been played on consecutive days since 1955 except that the former two games were played in different cities: Detroit and Montreal.

Detroit's loss gave Mike Babcock the unfortunate distinction of being the first coach in NHL history to lose game seven of a Stanley Cup Final with two different teams. Mike Keenan, the other to coach in two Finals game sevens with two different teams, had avoided the distinction by winning the second Finals game seven he coached. He was with the Philadelphia Flyers in 1987 when they lost to the Edmonton Oilers, and was with the New York Rangers when they won the Cup in 1994.

This was the last Stanley Cup Final played at both Mellon Arena and Joe Louis Arena, which was closed after the following season and the 2016–17 season, respectively. The Penguins moved to the Consol Energy Center for the 2010–11 season, and the Red Wings moved to Little Caesars Arena for the 2017–18 season. This was also the last Stanley Cup Final that was ever played entirely in one time zone, as the Eastern Conference now consists of all of the league's teams that are based in the Eastern Time Zone, while the Western Conference consists entirely of the NHL's teams that are based outside of it.

== Team rosters ==
=== Detroit Red Wings ===
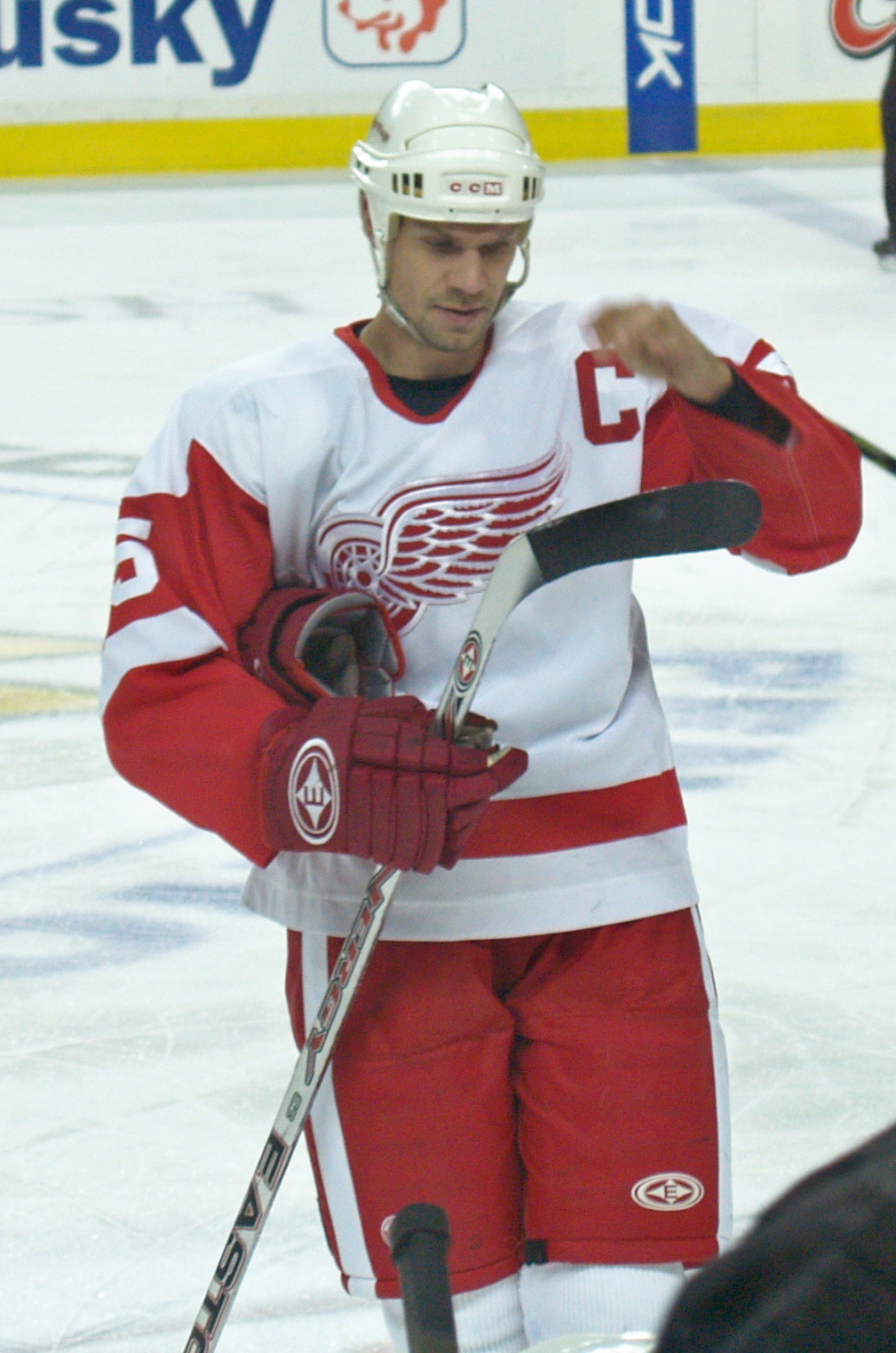
Nicklas Lidstrom captained the Red Wings to the second-straight Finals appearance and sixth appearance in fourteen years

Roster on June 12, 2009.

No.	Nat	Player	Pos	S/G	Age	Acquired	Birthplace
8	(United States)	Justin Abdelkader	C	L	22	2005	Muskegon, Michigan
24	(United States)	Chris Chelios	D	R	47	1999	Chicago, Illinois
11	(Canada)	Daniel Cleary	RW	L	30	2005	Carbonear, Newfoundland and Labrador
29	(United States)	Ty Conklin	G	L	33	2008	Phoenix, Arizona
13	(Russia)	Pavel Datsyuk (A)	C	L	30	1998	Sverdlovsk, Soviet Union
44	(Canada)	Aaron Downey	RW	R	34	2007	Honeywood, Ontario
33	(Canada)	Kris Draper (A)	C	L	38	1993	Toronto, Ontario
52	(Sweden)	Jonathan Ericsson	D	L	25	2002	Karlskrona, Sweden
51	(Finland)	Valtteri Filppula	C	L	25	2002	Vantaa, Finland
93	(Sweden)	Johan Franzen	LW	L	29	2004	Vetlanda, Sweden
43	(Canada)	Darren Helm	C	L	22	2005	St. Andrews, Manitoba
96	(Sweden)	Tomas Holmstrom	RW	L	36	1994	Piteå, Sweden
81	(Slovakia)	Marian Hossa	RW	L	30	2008	Stará Ľubovňa, Czechoslovakia
35	(United States)	Jimmy Howard	G	L	25	2003	Ogdensburg, New York
26	(Czech Republic)	Jiri Hudler	LW	L	25	2002	Olomouc, Czechoslovakia
46	(Czech Republic)	Jakub Kindl	D	L	22	2005	Šumperk, Czechoslovakia
82	(Slovakia)	Tomas Kopecky	LW	L	27	2000	Ilava, Czechoslovakia
55	(Sweden)	Niklas Kronwall	D	L	28	2000	Stockholm, Sweden
22	(United States)	Brett Lebda	D	L	27	2004	Buffalo Grove, Illinois
21	(Finland)	Ville Leino	LW	L	25	2008	Savonlinna, Finland
5	(Sweden)	Nicklas Lidstrom (C)	D	L	39	1989	Krylbo, Sweden
3	(Sweden)	Andreas Lilja	D	L	33	2005	Helsingborg, Sweden
18	(Canada)	Kirk Maltby	RW	R	36	1996	Guelph, Ontario
14	(Canada)	Derek Meech	D	L	25	2002	Winnipeg, Manitoba
30	(Canada)	Chris Osgood	G	L	36	2005	Peace River, Alberta
28	(United States)	Brian Rafalski	D	R	35	2007	Dearborn, Michigan
37	(Sweden)	Mikael Samuelsson	RW	R	32	2005	Mariefred, Sweden
23	(Canada)	Brad Stuart	D	L	29	2008	Rocky Mountain House, Alberta
40	(Sweden)	Henrik Zetterberg (A)	C	L	28	1999	Njurunda, Sweden

=== Pittsburgh Penguins ===
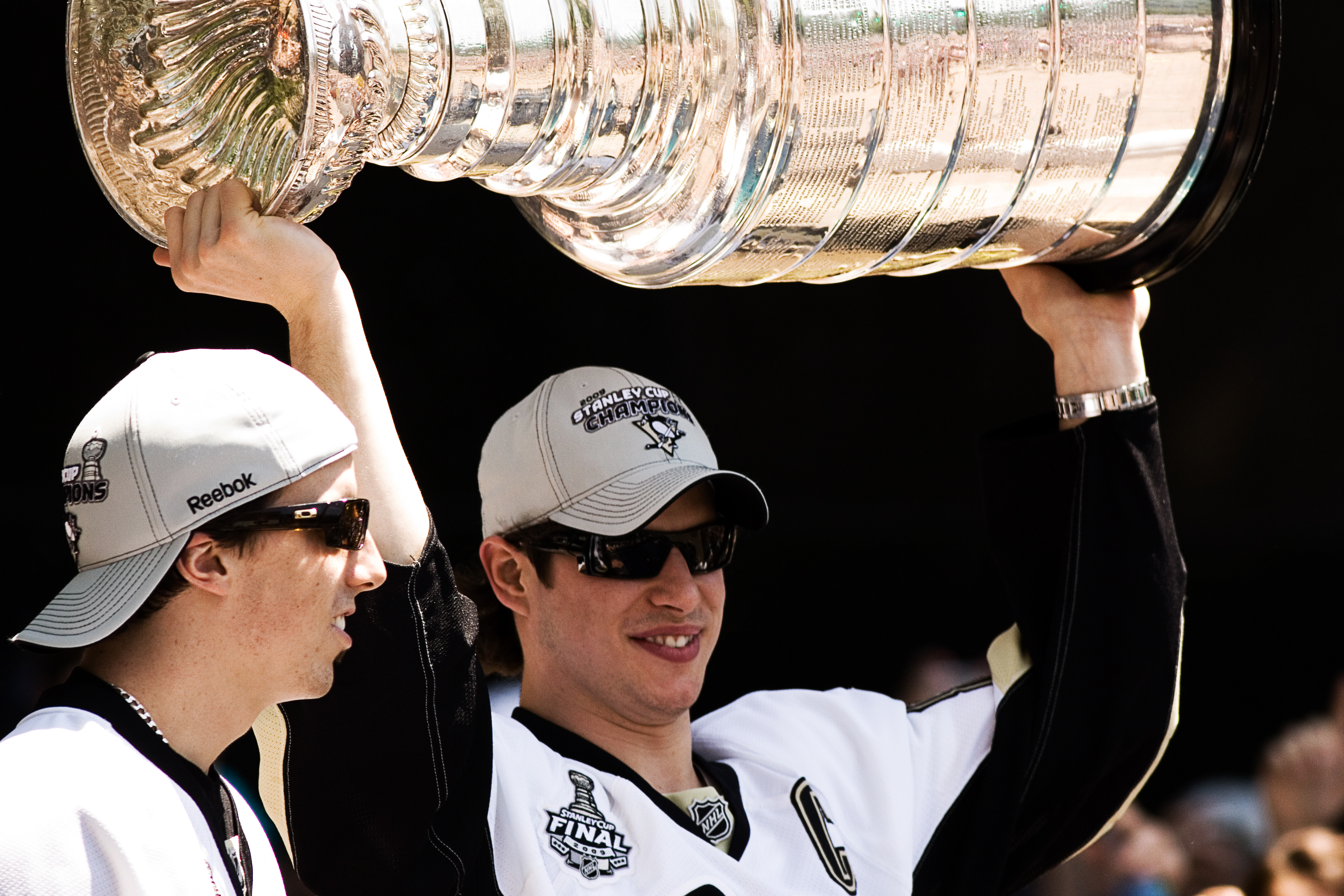
Sidney Crosby captained the Penguins to their first Stanley Cup championship since 1992

Roster on June 12, 2009.

No.	Nat	Player	Pos	S/G	Age	Acquired	Birthplace
27	(Canada)	Craig Adams	RW	R	32	2009	Seria, Brunei
43	(Canada)	Philippe Boucher	D	R	36	2008	Saint-Apollinaire, Quebec
24	(Canada)	Matt Cooke	LW	L	30	2008	Belleville, Ontario
87	(Canada)	Sidney Crosby (C)	C	L	21	2005	Cole Harbour, Nova Scotia
9	(Canada)	Pascal Dupuis	LW	L	30	2008	Laval, Quebec
7	(United States)	Mark Eaton	D	L	32	2006	Wilmington, Delaware
26	(Ukraine)	Ruslan Fedotenko	LW	L	30	2008	Kyiv, Soviet Union
29	(Canada)	Marc-Andre Fleury	G	L	24	2003	Sorel, Quebec
32	(Canada)	Mathieu Garon	G	R	31	2009	Chandler, Quebec
2	(United States)	Hal Gill	D	L	34	2008	Concord, Massachusetts
28	(Canada)	Eric Godard	RW	R	29	2008	Vernon, British Columbia
3	(United States)	Alex Goligoski	D	L	23	2004	Grand Rapids, Minnesota
55	(Russia)	Sergei Gonchar (A)	D	L	35	2005	Chelyabinsk, Soviet Union
13	(United States)	Bill Guerin	RW	R	38	2009	Worcester, Massachusetts
48	(Canada)	Tyler Kennedy	C	R	22	2004	Sault Ste. Marie, Ontario
14	(Canada)	Chris Kunitz	LW	L	29	2009	Regina, Saskatchewan
58	(Canada)	Kris Letang	D	R	22	2005	Montreal, Quebec
71	(Russia)	Evgeni Malkin (A)	C	L	22	2004	Magnitogorsk, Soviet Union
44	(United States)	Brooks Orpik	D	L	28	2001	San Francisco, California
81	(Slovakia)	Miroslav Satan	RW	L	34	2008	Topoľčany, Czechoslovakia
4	(United States)	Rob Scuderi	D	L	30	1998	Syosset, New York
11	(Canada)	Jordan Staal	C	L	20	2006	Thunder Bay, Ontario
17	(Czech Republic)	Petr Sykora	RW	L	32	2007	Plzeň, Czechoslovakia
25	(Canada)	Maxime Talbot	C	L	25	2002	LeMoyne, Quebec
15	(Canada)	Michael Zigomanis	C	R	28	2008	Toronto, Ontario

== Stanley Cup engraving ==
The 2009 Stanley Cup was presented to Penguins captain Sidney Crosby by NHL Commissioner Gary Bettman following the Penguins 2–1 win over the Red Wings in game seven.

The following Penguins players and staff had their names engraved on the Stanley Cup

2008–09 Pittsburgh Penguins

=== Players ===
Centres

- 11 Jordan Staal
- 15 Michael Zigomanis †
- 25 Maxime Talbot*
- 48 Tyler Kennedy*
- 71 Evgeni Malkin (A)
- 87 Sidney Crosby (Captain)

Wingers

- 9 Pascal Dupuis
- 13 Bill Guerin
- 14 Chris Kunitz
- 17 Petr Sykora
- 24 Matt Cooke
- 26 Ruslan Fedotenko
- 27 Craig Adams
- 28 Eric Godard
- 81 Miroslav Satan

Defencemen

- 2 Hal Gill
- 3 Alex Goligoski
- 4 Rob Scuderi
- 7 Mark Eaton
- 43 Philippe Boucher
- 44 Brooks Orpik
- 55 Sergei Gonchar (A)
- 58 Kris Letang

Goaltenders

- 29 Marc-Andre Fleury
- 32 Mathieu Garon
- * Played both centre and wing.
- † Exemption granted to engrave the name of a player who did not automatically qualify. (Note: Automatic qualification for a player's name to be engraved on the Stanley Cup: Playing in (for a goaltender, dressing for) at least one Stanley Cup Final game or at least half of regular season games for the Stanley Cup winning team.)

=== Coaching and administrative staff ===
- Mario Lemieux (chairman/owner/alternate governor), Ron Burkle (owner/alt. governor), Bill Kassling (director)
- Tony Liberati (director/alt. governor), Tom Grealish (director), Ken Sawyer (chief executive officer/governor)
- David Morehouse (president/alt. governor), Ray Shero (vice-president/general manager/alt. governor), Chuck Fletcher (assistant general manager), Eddie Johnston (sr. advisor, hockey operations)
- Jason Botterill (director of hockey administration), Dan Bylsma (head coach), Mike Yeo (assistant coach), Tom Fitzgerald (assistant coach)
- Gilles Meloche (goaltending coach), Mike Kadar (strength & conditioning coach), Travis Ramsay (video coach), Chris Stewart (athletic therapist)
- Scott Adams (assistant athletic therapist), Mark Mortland (physical therapist), Dana Heinze (equipment manager)
- Paul DeFazio (assistant equipment manager), Danny Kroll (assistant equipment manager), Frank Buonomo (Sr. Director of Team Operations & Communications)
- Tom McMillian (vice-president, communications), Jay Heinbuck (director of amateur scouting), Dan MacKinnon (director of pro scouting)

=== Engraving notes ===
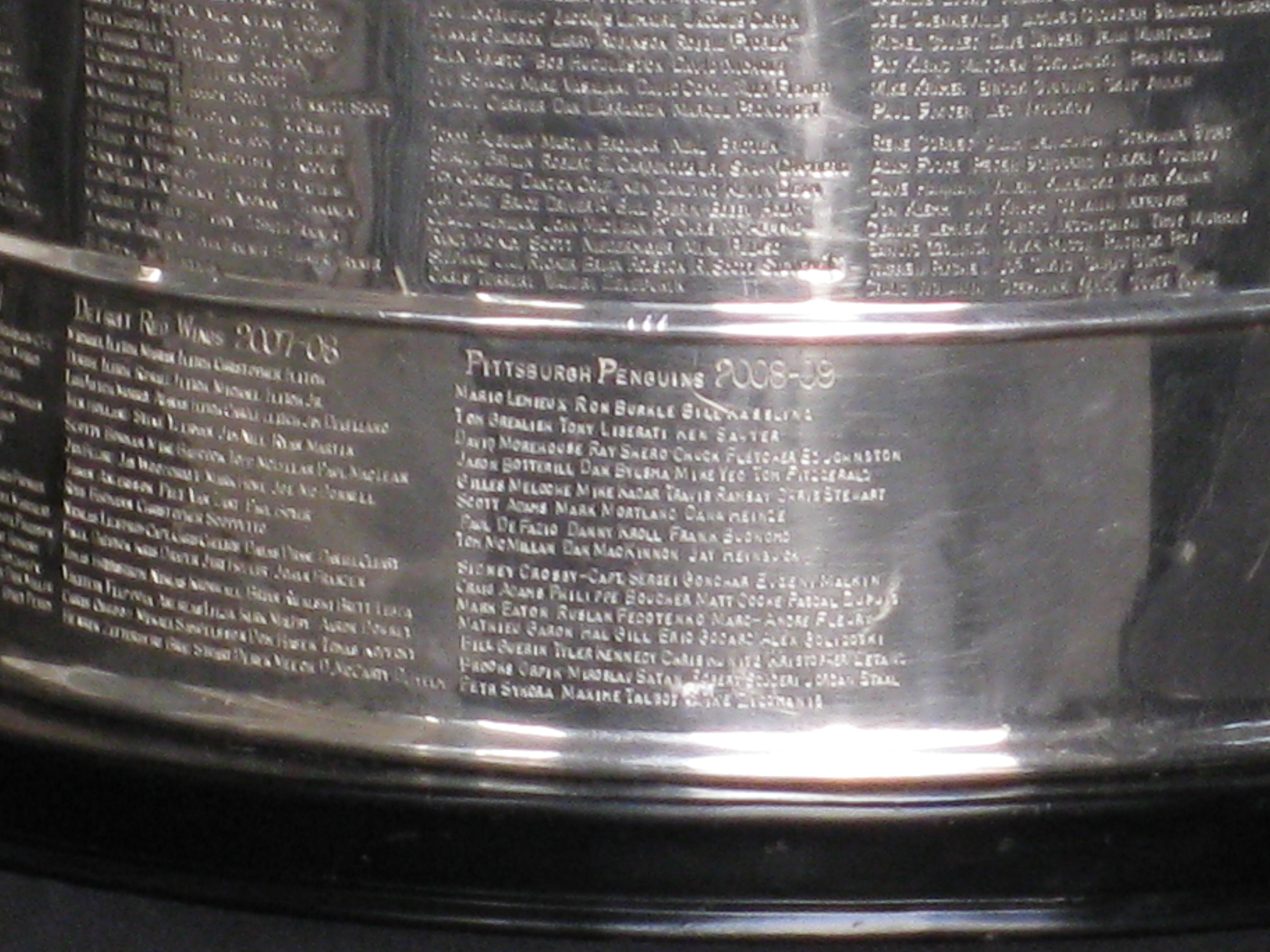

- #15 Michael Zigomanis (C) played in 22 regular season games and missed the whole playoffs due to injuries. Pittsburgh included his name on the Stanley Cup by petitioning for league approval.
- Mario Lemieux and Gilles Meloche are the only ones to have their names engraved on the Stanley Cup in the three Penguins championships of 1991, 1992, and 2009. (Kevin Stevens won as a player in '91 and '92, but was not engraved as a professional scout for the team in 2009.) However, Meloche is the only one to hold the same position for all three wins. Dr. Charles Burke was the only other member of the Penguins to win 3 Stanley Cup rings. However, his name is not on the Stanley Cup.
- Despite having served with the organization in various positions for a total of 25 years, this was Eddie Johnston's first Stanley Cup with the Penguins. (Also, his first in management, and his first since winning as a player with the Boston Bruins in 1970, and 1972.)
- Dan Bylsma was the 13th rookie coach to win the Stanley Cup and the first since 1986. Bylsma only coached 25 regular season games, before leading Pittsburgh to the Stanley Cup Final. He is the second mid-season replacement rookie coach to win the Stanley Cup (See 1971 Stanley Cup Final for the other coach, Al MacNeil). Bylsma was also a player under Mike Babcock on the 2002–03 and 2003-04 roster of the Mighty Ducks of Anaheim.

=== Player notes ===
- Six players on the roster during the Finals did not have their names engraved on the Stanley Cup due to not qualifying. All six were included in the team picture.
  - #38 Chris Minard (LW) – 20 regular season games
  - #42 Dustin Jeffrey (C) – 14 regular season games
  - #22 Jeff Taffe (LW) – 8 regular season games
  - #1 John Curry (G) – 3 regular season games
  - #65 Ben Lovejoy (D) – 2 regular season games
  - #30 Brad Thiessen (G) – signed by the organization out of Northeastern University in April, served as practice goaltender in Wilkes-Barre/Scranton of the American Hockey League before being called up to Pittsburgh in May to fulfill the same role. He was included in the team celebrations and official picture with the Cup, despite the fact that at the time, he still had yet to play in his first professional game of hockey and spent the whole season playing college hockey.

== Notes ==
Preceded by Detroit Red Wings; 2008	Pittsburgh Penguins; Stanley Cup champions 2009	Succeeded by Chicago Blackhawks; 2010
