= Michael Zigomanis =

Canadian ice hockey player (born 1981)

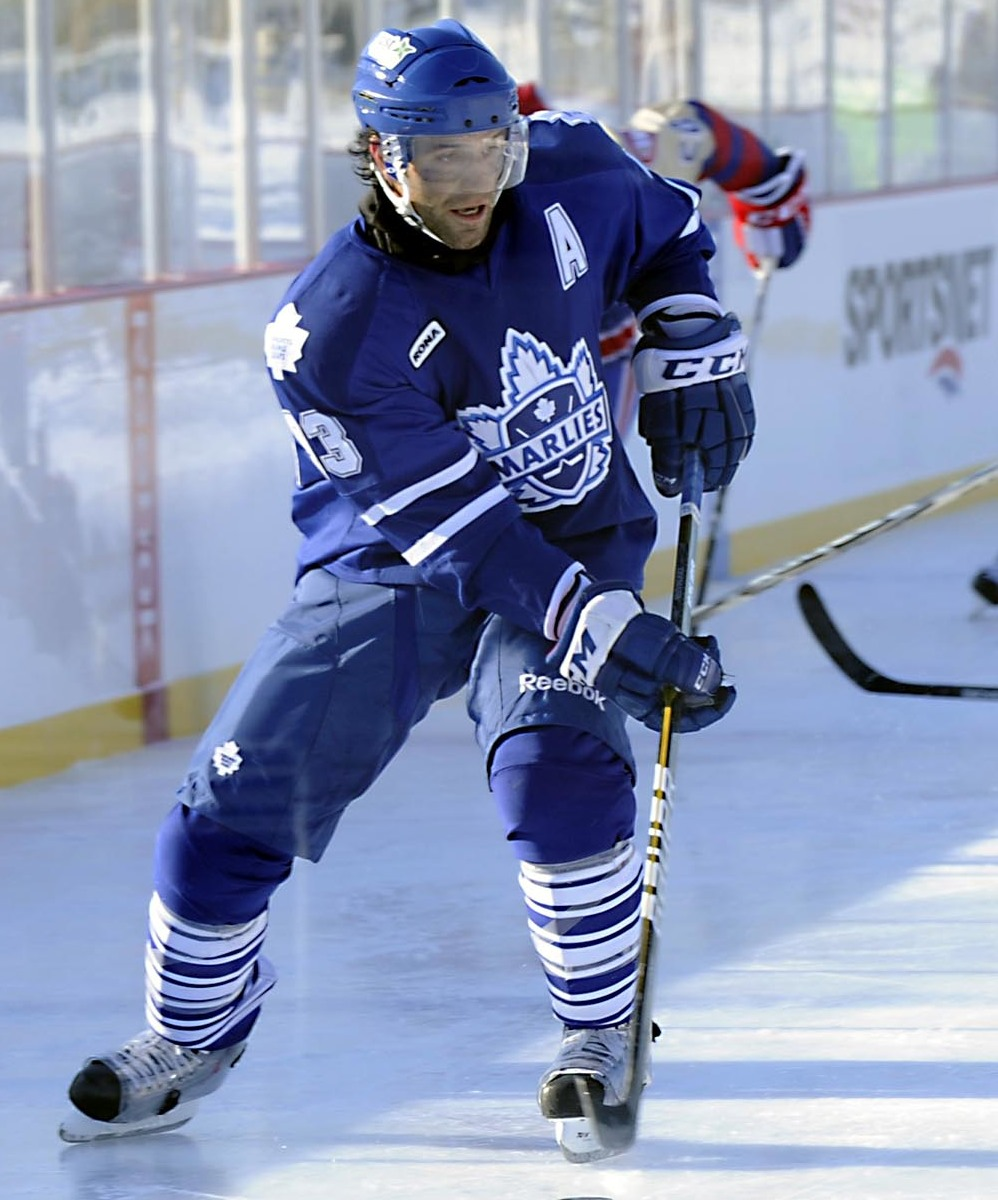
- Zigomanis with the Toronto Marlies in 2012
- Born: January 17, 1981 (age 45) North York, Ontario, Canada
- Height: 6 ft 0 in (183 cm)
- Weight: 200 lb (91 kg; 14 st 4 lb)
- Position: Centre
- Shot: Right
- Played for: Carolina Hurricanes; St. Louis Blues; Phoenix Coyotes; Pittsburgh Penguins; Djurgårdens IF; Toronto Maple Leafs
- NHL draft: 64th overall, 1999; Buffalo Sabres; 46th overall, 2001; Carolina Hurricanes
- Playing career: 2001–2014

Michael Zigomanis (born January 17, 1981) is a Canadian former professional ice hockey centre. Zigomanis was drafted twice. In the 1999 NHL entry draft he was selected 64th overall by the Buffalo Sabres, but was not signed. He re-entered for the 2001 NHL entry draft and was selected by the Carolina Hurricanes 46th overall.

Zigomanis was born in North York, Ontario, but grew up in Markham, Ontario.

== Early life ==
He was born to Macedonian parents who emigrated to Canada from Kastoria, Greece. As a youth, he played in the 1995 Quebec International Pee-Wee Hockey Tournament with a minor ice hockey team from North York. Zigomanis attended Father Michael McGivney Catholic Academy in Markham, graduating in 2000.

== Playing career ==
Zigomanis played four seasons of junior hockey with the Kingston Frontenacs of the Ontario Hockey League (OHL). He was chosen in the second round, 25th overall by the Frontenacs in the 1997 OHL Priority Selection Draft. In his first season with the Frontenacs, he scored 23 goals and 74 points in 62 games. His numbers increased the following year, collecting 29 goals and 85 points. His third year saw another increase, marking 40 goals and 94 points, good for fifth best in the league. The 2000–01 season was his last in the OHL, where he scored 40 goals and 77 points in 52 games. He finished his career with the Frontenacs with 330 points, fourth on the team's all-time scoring list. He represented Canada at the 2001 World Junior Hockey Championships, where he scored 2 goals and 6 points on the way to third place (bronze medal).

Zigomanis was originally drafted in the second round, 64th overall, by the Buffalo Sabres in the 1999 NHL entry draft. Zigomanis agreed to terms with the Sabres just before the 5 pm deadline on June 1, 2001, but there was a typographical error in his contract that was faxed to the league offices. By the time the error was discovered, the deadline had passed, and the NHL ruled that he would have to re-enter the NHL draft, as he had not been signed before the deadline. He re-entered the draft and was selected in the second round again, this time 46th overall by Carolina Hurricanes in 2001. Carolina signed Zigomanis to a three-year contract on October 4, 2001, and he was assigned to the Hurricanes' American Hockey League (AHL) affiliate, the Lowell Lock Monsters.

On January 30, 2006, Zigomanis, Jesse Boulerice, Magnus Kahnberg, first round and fourth-round picks in the 2006 NHL entry draft and a fourth-round pick in the 2007 NHL entry draft were traded to the St. Louis Blues for Doug Weight and Erkki Rajamaki along with some retention of Weight's salary. He finished the season splitting time with the Blues and their AHL affiliate, the Peoria Rivermen.

In the 2006 offseason, Zigomanis left the Blues and signed a two-year contract with the Phoenix Coyotes. He became known as a faceoff specialist with the Coyotes, finished seventh best in the league. The Coyotes signed him to a contract extension through the 2008–09 season on February 16, 2007. On October 9, 2008, he was traded to the Pittsburgh Penguins for future considerations. While in Pittsburgh, Zigomanis provided faceoff and penalty killing expertise. He played 22 games with the Penguins before he seriously injured his shoulder in December. Zigomanis was only cleared to play in the Stanley Cup Final. He won the Stanley Cup with the Penguins that year.

An unrestricted free agent after his time in Pittsburgh, Zigomanis signed a professional tryout with the Toronto Marlies of the AHL on October 19, 2009. Zigomanis played only seven games but managed to score 13 points (all assists) before leaving for Europe on November 10, 2009, signing a contract for the rest of the 2009–10 season with Djurgårdens IF of the Swedish Elitserien.

On July 15, 2010, Zigomanis signed as a free agent to return to Toronto, signing a one-year, two-way contract with the Toronto Maple Leafs. On July 12, 2011, Zigomanis signed a one-year, two-way contract with the Maple Leafs worth $665,000 at the NHL level and $300,000 at the AHL level. After recording professional career highs of 61 points during the 2011–12 season, Zigomanis opted to remain with the Marlies and was re-signed to a one-year AHL contract as a free agent on July 30, 2012.

On July 10, 2013, Zigomanis signed an AHL-only contract with the Rochester Americans, the minor-league affiliate of the Buffalo Sabres, the team that drafted him in 1999.

== Broadcasting career ==
Zigomanis worked for the Toronto sports radio station Sportsnet 590 The Fan co-hosting the morning show from September 2019 until September 2021.

== Career statistics ==
=== Regular season and playoffs ===
			Regular season					Playoffs
Season	Team	League	GP	G	A	Pts	PIM	GP	G	A	Pts	PIM
1996–97	Wexford Raiders	MetJHL	40	37	48	85	23	—	—	—	—	—
1997–98	Kingston Frontenacs	OHL	62	23	51	74	30	12	1	6	7	2
1998–99	Kingston Frontenacs	OHL	67	29	56	85	36	5	1	7	8	2
1999–2000	Kingston Frontenacs	OHL	59	40	54	94	49	5	0	4	4	0
2000–01	Kingston Frontenacs	OHL	52	40	37	77	44	—	—	—	—	—
2001–02	Lowell Lock Monsters	AHL	79	18	30	48	24	5	1	1	2	2
2002–03	Lowell Lock Monsters	AHL	38	13	18	31	19	—	—	—	—	—
2002–03	Carolina Hurricanes	NHL	19	2	1	3	0	—	—	—	—	—
2003–04	Lowell Lock Monsters	AHL	61	17	35	52	56	—	—	—	—	—
2003–04	Carolina Hurricanes	NHL	17	0	3	3	2	—	—	—	—	—
2004–05	Lowell Lock Monsters	AHL	76	29	31	60	71	11	4	7	11	8
2005–06	Carolina Hurricanes	NHL	21	1	0	1	4	—	—	—	—	—
2005–06	Lowell Lock Monsters	AHL	11	6	7	13	19	—	—	—	—	—
2005–06	St. Louis Blues	NHL	2	0	0	0	0	—	—	—	—	—
2005–06	Peoria Rivermen	AHL	28	10	18	28	16	4	2	4	6	6
2006–07	Phoenix Coyotes	NHL	75	14	9	23	46	—	—	—	—	—
2007–08	Phoenix Coyotes	NHL	33	2	1	3	6	—	—	—	—	—
2007–08	San Antonio Rampage	AHL	27	10	15	25	14	7	0	5	5	10
2008–09	Pittsburgh Penguins	NHL	22	2	4	6	27	—	—	—	—	—
2009–10	Toronto Marlies	AHL	7	0	13	13	0	—	—	—	—	—
2009–10	Djurgårdens IF	SEL	27	4	7	11	12	5	0	0	0	8
2010–11	Toronto Maple Leafs	NHL	8	0	1	1	4	—	—	—	—	—
2010–11	Toronto Marlies	AHL	64	14	33	47	66	—	—	—	—	—
2011–12	Toronto Marlies	AHL	68	19	42	61	52	13	4	2	6	10
2012–13	Toronto Marlies	AHL	65	7	28	35	42	9	2	7	9	8
2013–14	Rochester Americans	AHL	50	12	17	29	32	—	—	—	—	—
AHL totals			574	155	287	442	411	49	13	26	39	44
NHL totals			197	21	19	40	89	—	—	—	—	—

Medal record

Representing Canada

Ice hockey

World Junior Championships
Bronze medal – third place	2001 Moscow	

=== International ===
Year	Team	Event	Result	GP	G	A	Pts	PIM
1999	Canada	U18	1st place, gold medalist(s)	3	2	0	2	0
2001	Canada	WJC	3rd place, bronze medalist(s)	7	2	2	4	0
Junior totals				10	4	2	6	0

== Awards and honours ==
Award	Year
OHL
CHL Top Prospects Game	1999
William Hanley Trophy (Most Gentlemanly Player)	2000
AHL
All-Star Game	2004
Yanick Dupre Memorial Award	2013
NHL
Stanley Cup (Pittsburgh Penguins)	2009
