= 2011 NHL Winter Classic =

Outdoor National Hockey League game in Pittsburgh, Pennsylvania

	1	2	3	Total
Washington Capitals	0	2	1	3
Pittsburgh Penguins	0	1	0	1
- Date: January 1, 2011
- Venue: Heinz Field
- City: Pittsburgh
- Attendance: 68,111

The 2011 NHL Winter Classic (known via corporate sponsorship as the Bridgestone NHL Winter Classic) was an outdoor ice hockey game played in the National Hockey League (NHL) on January 1, 2011, at Heinz Field in Pittsburgh, Pennsylvania. The fourth edition of the Winter Classic, it matched the Washington Capitals against the Pittsburgh Penguins; the Capitals won, 3–1. The game, rescheduled from its original 1:00 p.m. ET start time to 8:00 p.m. due to weather concerns, was telecast on NBC in the United States, and CBC (English) and RDS (French) in Canada. Pittsburgh native Jackie Evancho performed the Star Spangled Banner and Pittsburgh sports legends Mario Lemieux, Franco Harris and Jerome Bettis presided over the ceremonial dropping of the puck, and during the second intermission Harris and Bettis hosted a fan event at the outside rink.

The 2011 Winter Classic was the second time the Penguins participated in an outdoor NHL game; the team previously visited the Buffalo Sabres for the inaugural Winter Classic in 2008. Most notably, the Classic pitted two recent number-one draft picks against each other: Capitals winger Alexander Ovechkin (2004) and Penguins center Sidney Crosby (2005); both players entered the league in the same year, 2005, due to the 2004–05 NHL lockout and contributed to a rivalry between the two teams that has been growing since the early 1990s. During the game, Crosby suffered a concussion from a collision, causing him to miss significant playing time over the next year.

== Uniforms ==
At the event, the teams wore vintage uniforms based on Reebok's "Edge" template. The visiting Capitals wore a replica of their inaugural 1974–75 white uniform which they wore through the 1994–95 season, with red helmets. The uniforms would remain the Capitals alternate until 2015, when they were replaced by their red counterpart.

The Penguins wore new uniforms, based on those of their inaugural 1967–68 season; the navy and baby blue colors were reversed, and the jerseys featured a crest of their original skating penguin logo, in place of the diagonal letters. The jerseys would replace the team's previous throwbacks from the 2008 Winter Classic as their alternate uniforms, but would subsequently be dubbed the "Blue Jerseys of Doom" after Sidney Crosby suffering a severe concussion in the Winter Classic from an elbow to the head from Capitals' forward David Steckel, which ended Crosby's season at the half-way mark. He played the following game against the Tampa Bay Lightning but a hit from Lightning defenseman Victor Hedman took him out of the game and sidelined the rest of the season and most of the 2011–12 season. The bad luck with the jersey continued, as Crosby, Evgeni Malkin, and Jordan Staal all suffered injuries in other games wearing the uniforms. Three days after Crosby sustained a broken jaw wearing the blue jerseys in 2013, the uniform was permanently mothballed and the Penguins opted to wear their standard black uniforms in their remaining games they were scheduled to wear the blue jerseys.

== Delayed start time ==
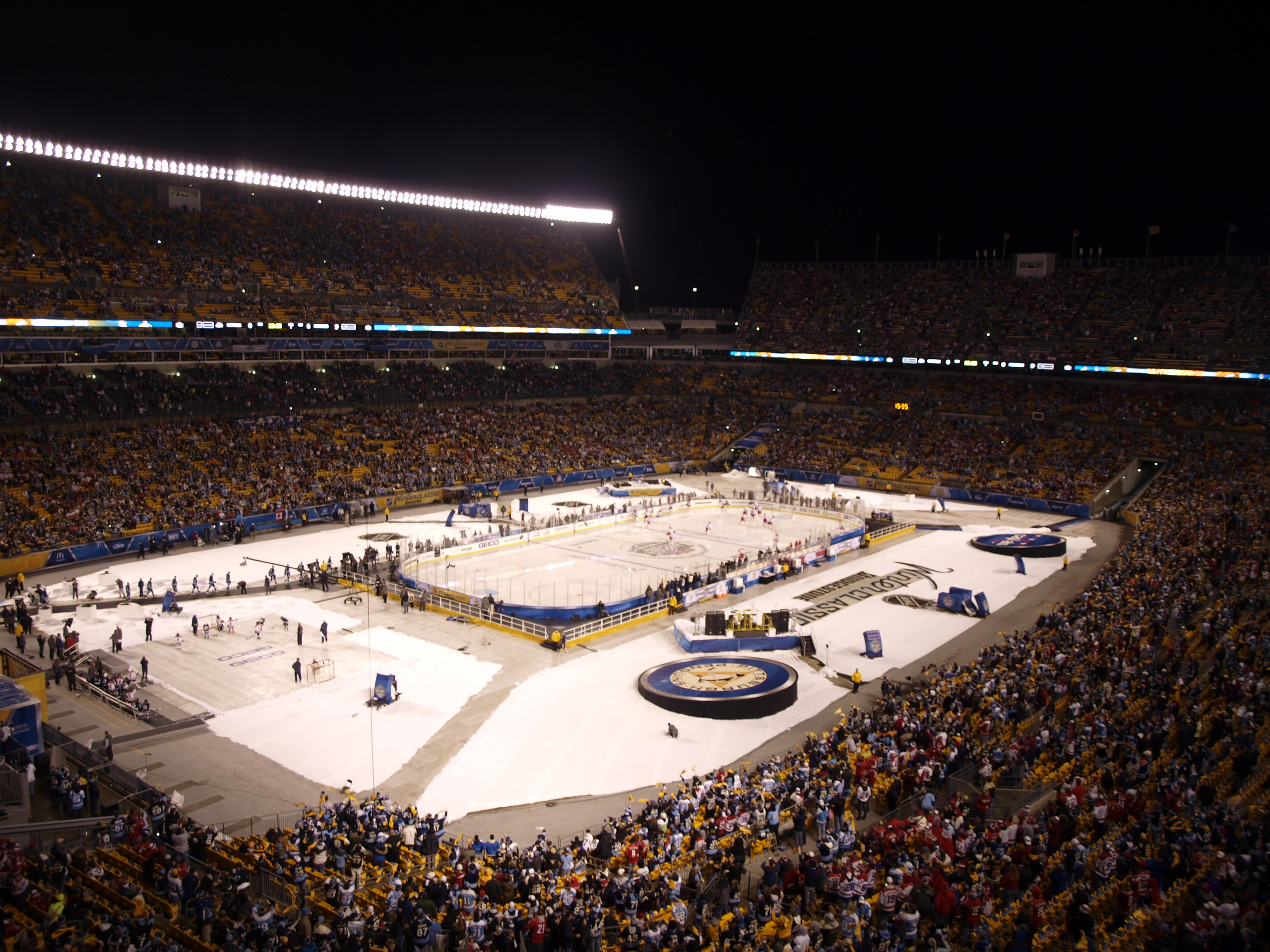
The threat of rain pushed the start time from 1:00 pm to 8:00 pm ET.

The game had originally been scheduled for 1:00 p.m., but due to concerns about rain, on December 31 the game was shifted to an 8:00 p.m. start. A few weeks prior, the possibility was raised that the Winter Classic might be postponed or canceled altogether. All major weather outlets forecast unseasonably warm temperatures for the day of the game, with the possibility of rain. Heavy or constant rain was the greater concern for the NHL, as it could eventually make the ice surface unplayable. Light rain would have frozen on contact and made the surface uneven, while hard rain could have possibly flooded the rink. Early on the NHL had contingency plans to push the game back to January 2 if necessary, but preferred not to do so since this would have conflicted with telecasts of NFL games. If neither date had reasonable weather, the game would have been postponed and the matchup rescheduled indoors at Consol Energy Center (now PPG Paints Arena) later in the season. New Year's Weekend was the only time the Steelers would have allowed Heinz Field to be available, since they needed time to get it ready for any postseason home game (which could have been as early as January 8); subsequent future outdoor games in Pittsburgh now would have to either be a Stadium Series game at Heinz Field or either a Stadium Series or Winter Classic game at PNC Park to avoid future scheduling conflicts with the Steelers.

As New Year's Day approached weather forecasts solidified that by late afternoon the Pittsburgh region would be cooling to the 40s and eventually 30s, and major precipitation would be over by early evening for the duration of the weekend. As it turned out, the few fast-moving bands of light rain in the area had no effect on the surface, and no problems were reported.

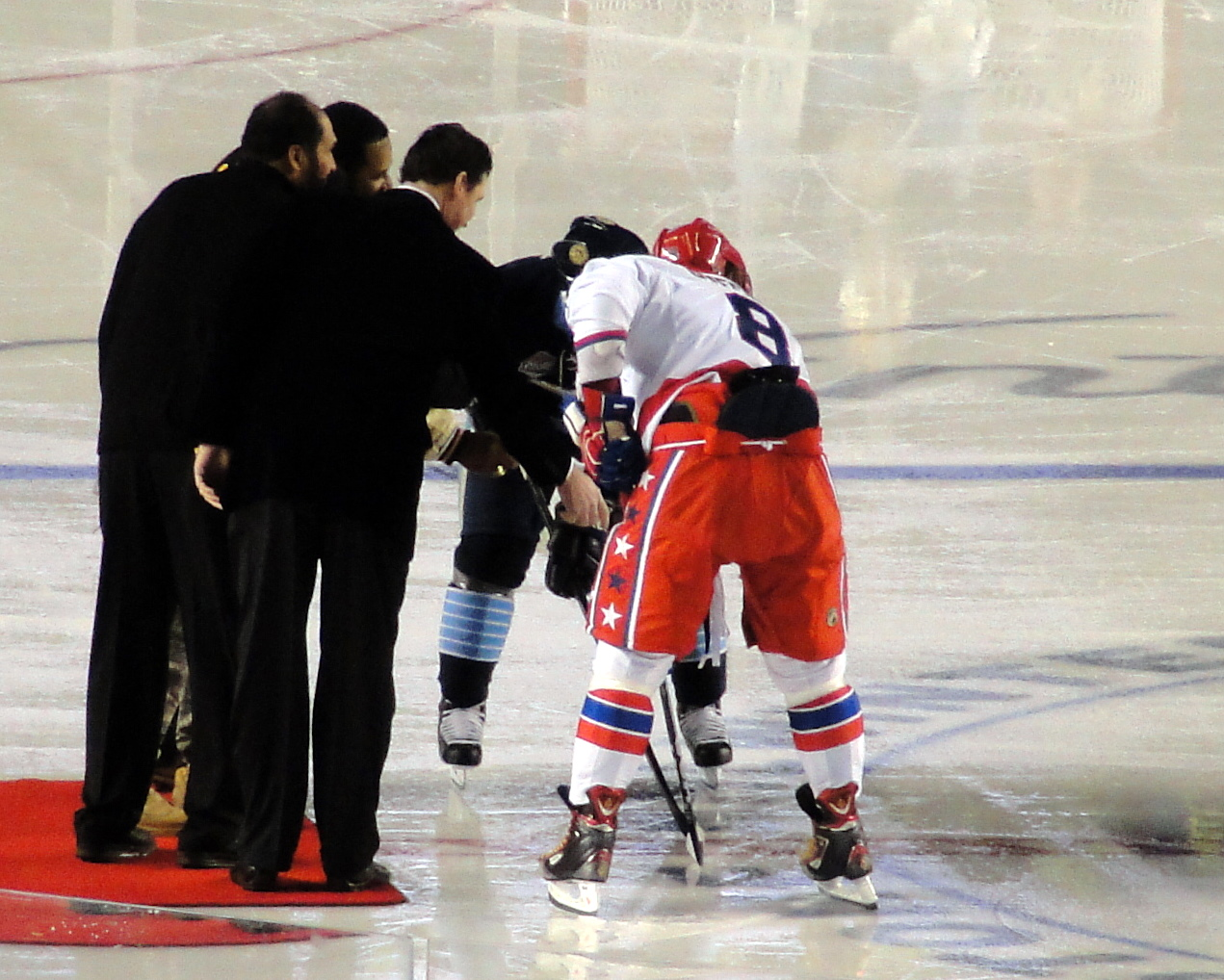
Ceremonial puck drop.

== Pre-game ==
Canadian singer and former Barenaked Ladies frontman Steven Page performed the Canadian national anthem in English and French while America's Got Talent runner-up and Pittsburgh native Jackie Evancho sang the American national anthem. Following their performances, Pittsburgh sports legends Franco Harris, Jerome Bettis and Mario Lemieux joined U.S. Army Sergeant First Class Bradley T. Tinstman for the ceremonial puck drop.

== Rule changes ==
As with the 2008 and 2009 games in Ralph Wilson Stadium and Wrigley Field, the NHL announced a rule change to account for any adverse weather conditions that could give either team an unfair advantage. Due to high winds, the teams changed sides an additional time, at the first whistle after the halfway point of the third period. This was done at exactly the halfway point of the third period in 2008 because of falling snow and again in 2009 due to high winds.

== Game summary ==
Jan 1, 2011	Washington Capitals	3–1	Pittsburgh Penguins	Heinz Field	Recap

Capitals goalie Semyon Varlamov made 32 saves in the win. After a scoreless first period, the Penguins scored first early in the second period with Evgeni Malkin's goal. Washington then scored three unanswered goals, one by Mike Knuble and two by Eric Fehr, to win the game.

Scoring summary
Period	Team	Goal	Assist(s)	Time	Score
1st	No scoring				
2nd	PIT	Evgeni Malkin (14)	Kris Letang (27) and Marc-Andre Fleury (1)	02:13	1–0 PIT
2nd	WSH	Mike Knuble (9) – pp	Nicklas Backstrom (26) and Mike Green (11)	06:54	1–1
2nd	WSH	Eric Fehr (6)	Marcus Johansson (4)	14:45	2–1 WSH
3rd	WSH	Eric Fehr (7)	Jason Chimera (7) and John Erskine (6)	11:59	3–1 WSH

Number in parentheses represents the player's total in goals or assists to that point of the season

Penalty summary
Period	Team	Player	Penalty	Time	PIM
1st	PIT	Paul Martin	Hooking	04:40	2:00
1st	WSH	Mike Green	Holding	08:21	2:00
1st	WSH	John Erskine	Fighting – major	11:52	5:00
1st	PIT	Mike Rupp	Fighting – major	11:52	5:00
2nd	WSH	Brooks Laich	Goaltender interference	02:59	2:00
2nd	PIT	Maxime Talbot	Holding	05:56	2:00
2nd	WSH	John Erskine	Hooking	15:37	2:00
3rd	WSH	Mike Knuble	Delay of game (puck over glass)	07:28	2:00

Shots by period
Team	1	2	3	Total
Washington	12	16	4	32
Pittsburgh	16	8	9	33

Power play opportunities
Team	Goals/Opportunities
Washington	1/2
Pittsburgh	0/4

Three star selections
	Team	Player	Statistics
1st	WSH	Semyon Varlamov	32 Saves
2nd	WSH	Eric Fehr	2 Goals
3rd	PIT	Evgeni Malkin	1 Goal

== Team rosters ==
Washington Capitals
#		Player	Position
1	(Russia)	Semyon Varlamov	G
4	(Canada)	John Erskine	D
8	(Russia)	Alexander Ovechkin (C)	LW
16	(Canada)	Eric Fehr	RW
19	(Sweden)	Nicklas Backstrom (A)	C
21	(Canada)	Brooks Laich	LW
22	(United States)	Mike Knuble (A)	RW
23	(Canada)	Scott Hannan	D
25	(Canada)	Jason Chimera	LW
26	(United States)	Matt Hendricks	LW
27	(Canada)	Karl Alzner	D
28	(Russia)	Alexander Semin	RW
30	(Czech Republic)	Michal Neuvirth	G
39	(United States)	Dave Steckel	C
52	(Canada)	Mike Green	D
55	(Canada)	Jeff Schultz	D
74	(United States)	John Carlson	D
83	(Canada)	Jay Beagle	RW
85	(Canada)	Mathieu Perreault	C
90	(Sweden)	Marcus Johansson	C
Head coach: (Canada) Bruce Boudreau

Pittsburgh Penguins
#		Player	Position
1	(United States)	Brent Johnson	G
3	(United States)	Alex Goligoski	D
4	(Czech Republic)	Zbynek Michalek	D
5	(Canada)	Deryk Engelland	D
7	(United States)	Paul Martin	D
9	(Canada)	Pascal Dupuis	RW
10	(Canada)	Mark Letestu	C
11	(Canada)	Jordan Staal (A)	C
14	(Canada)	Chris Kunitz	LW
17	(United States)	Michael Rupp	C
24	(Canada)	Matt Cooke	RW
25	(Canada)	Maxime Talbot	LW
27	(Canada)	Craig Adams	RW
29	(Canada)	Marc-Andre Fleury	G
44	(United States)	Brooks Orpik (A)	D
45	(Canada)	Arron Asham	LW
48	(Canada)	Tyler Kennedy	RW
58	(Canada)	Kris Letang	D
71	(Russia)	Evgeni Malkin (A)	LW
87	(Canada)	Sidney Crosby (C)	C
Head coach: (United States) Dan Bylsma

Brent Johnson dressed for the Pittsburgh Penguins as the back-up goalie and did not enter the game.
Michal Neuvirth dressed for the Washington Capitals as the back-up goalie and did not enter the game.

=== Scratches ===
- Washington Capitals: Tom Poti, Tyler Sloan
- Pittsburgh Penguins: Eric Godard, Chris Conner, Ben Lovejoy

=== Officials ===
- Referees — Paul Devorski, Stephen Walkom
- Linesmen — Pierre Champoux, Derek Amell

== Broadcasting ==
The 2011 Winter Classic was televised in the United States by NBC, and in Canada by CBC Television (English) and Réseau des sports (French). The game garnered the highest ratings in Classic history on American television and a 22 percent increase in viewership compared to the previous year, capturing a 2.3 rating and 4.5 million viewers. Overall, the game was the most watched NHL contest in the United States since 1996, and the most watched regular season NHL game since 1975. Its overall ratings boost also helped NBC win the evening as the most watched network for January 1, 2011. These marks were achieved despite the seven-hour postponement of the game, which prevented network promotion of the new ad hoc 8 p.m. start time; many program guides still listed the timeslot as featuring a rerun of Law & Order: Los Angeles. Pittsburgh and Washington led the ratings, with Baltimore, which is part of the Capitals' territory, in third. Buffalo, New York, was the highest-rated outside market, despite a Buffalo Sabres game playing opposite the Winter Classic.

Due to the delay, CBC's regularly scheduled Hockey Night in Canada game between the Toronto Maple Leafs and Ottawa Senators was only shown in its entirety for viewers in Ontario, with the remainder of the country breaking away for the Winter Classic at 8:00 p.m ET. CBC stations in Alberta subsequently broke away from the Winter Classic at 10:00 p.m. ET to begin coverage of the Calgary Flames/Edmonton Oilers game. CBC Sports live streamed all three games on its website.

== Legends Game ==
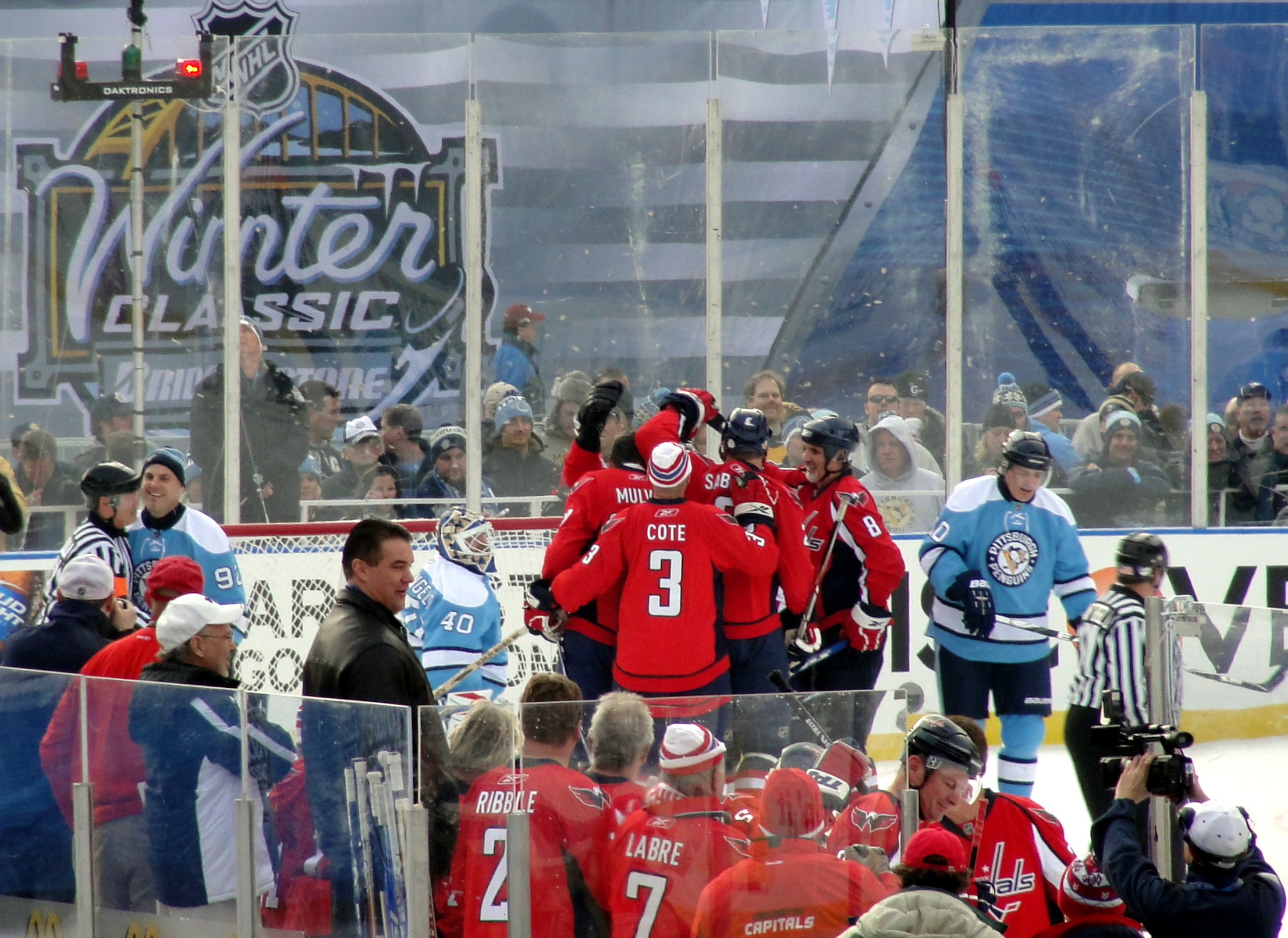
Capitals alumni celebrate Peter Bondra's tying goal.

The NHL Legends Game was played on December 31 in the morning. The game, which featured notable alumni from both the Penguins and the Capitals, was played in two 20-minute periods and ended in 5–5 tie. Penguins goals were scored by Rob Brown, Rod Buskas, Craig Simpson, Jay Caufield and Ron Francis. Mario Lemieux had two assists, Paul Mulvey of the Capitals had two goals, while Alan May, Mark Lofthouse and Peter Bondra scored one each. Bondra's goal tied the game with 45 seconds remaining and the game ended in a tie, as it did not have overtime or a shootout.

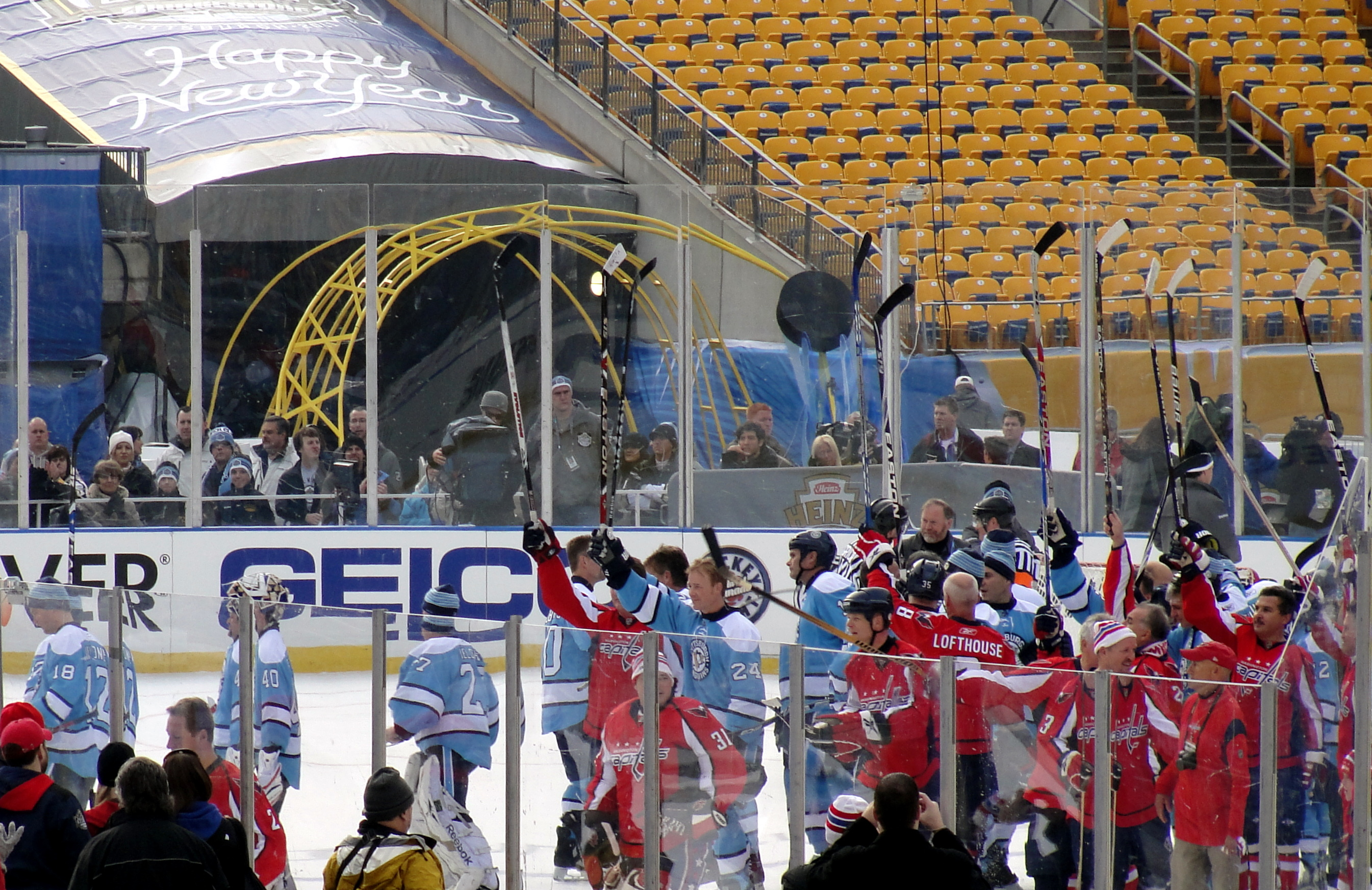
Penguins and Capitals alumni squads salute the crowd after the game.

The Penguins alumni wore the 1968–72 styled powder blue jerseys, Pittsburgh's former third jersey that was introduced in the 2008 Winter Classic. The Capitals alumni wore Washington's current home red jerseys.

Several complaints were made by the fans in attendance. Prior to the game starting, there were complaints regarding the sale of the tickets to game, which went on sale at 10:00 a.m. on December 17, 2010 for $25 a piece. Only 10,000 tickets were available for sale by the NHL, while Heinz Field has a capacity of over 68,111 seats for hockey. Many fans who tried to obtain tickets from Ticketmaster at exactly 10:00 a.m., either via the internet or by telephone could not get access to the company. Many of the locked-out fans complained that most of the people who got tickets were ticket scalpers or people trying to sell them online. By 10:14 a.m., the first two tickets showed up for sale on the Pittsburgh craigslist website for $250 a piece. Throughout the day, there were several entries on eBay and craigslist seeking as much as $699.99 for two tickets and $1,380 for a set of four.

The most vocal complaints were reserved for the time it took for many fans to get inside the stadium. Well into the first period of the two-period game, people reportedly still were entering Heinz Field. This was due to the stadium having only one open gate that morning, Gate B. Several fans further stated that not all the turnstiles were being used, a claim disputed by the Steelers, who spoke on behalf of stadium operations. Some confused fans also waited for other gates to open, which never happened.

Some spectators also complained that the game ended in a 5–5 tie with no overtime or shootout. Penguins alumnus Phil Bourque said after the game that "I think everybody's a little disappointed that we didn't get to the shootout, because it would have been great to see Mario. Pittsburgh would have gone with all Hall of Famers, of course, in our shootout group." Penguins alumni coach Eddie Johnston later stated that his shootout plan consisted of having Mario Lemieux, Ron Francis, Larry Murphy, Paul Coffey and Bryan Trottier participating in that order.

=== Legends rosters ===
Washington Capitals
#		Player	Position
22	(Canada)	Greg Adams	LW
33	(Canada)	Don Beaupre	G
12	(Slovakia)	Peter Bondra (C)	RW
20	(Canada)	Dino Ciccarelli	RW
3	(Canada)	Sylvain Cote	D
19	(Canada)	John Druce	RW
28	(Canada)	Dean Evason	C
10	(United States)	Alan Hangsleben	D
9	(Canada)	Nick Kypreos	LW
7	(Canada)	Yvon Labre	D
24	(Canada)	Gord Lane	D
18	(Canada)	Craig Laughlin	RW
8	(Canada)	Mark Lofthouse	RW
21	(Canada)	Dennis Maruk	C
16	(Canada)	Alan May	RW
27	(Canada)	Paul Mulvey	LW
24	(Canada)	Robert Picard	D
20	(Czech Republic)	Michal Pivonka	C
16	(Canada)	Errol Rausse	LW
2	(Canada)	Pat Ribble	D
17	(Canada)	Mike Ridley	C
31	(United States)	J. R. Reich	G
2	(Canada)	Ken Sabourin	D
23	(Canada)	Blair Stewart	C/LW
24	(Canada)	Scott Walker	RW
Coaches: Granny Grant, Joe Reekie and Rod Langway

Pittsburgh Penguins
#		Player	Position
66	(Canada)	Mario Lemieux (C)	C
10	(Canada)	Ron Francis	C
77	(Canada)	Paul Coffey	D
19	(Canada)	Bryan Trottier	C
55	(Canada)	Larry Murphy	D
13	(United States)	Bill Guerin	RW
29	(Canada)	Phil Bourque	LW
4	(Canada)	Rob Brown	RW
7	(Canada)	Rod Buskas	D
16	(United States)	Jay Caufield	RW
12	(Canada)	Bob Errey	LW
32	(Canada)	Dave Hannan	LW
18	(Canada)	Francois Leroux	D
24	(Canada)	Troy Loney	LW
12	(Canada)	Greg Malone	C
27	(Canada)	Gilles Meloche	G
18	(Canada)	Craig Simpson	LW
1	(Canada)	Frank Pietrangelo	G
23	(Canada)	Gary Rissling	LW
22	(Canada)	Rick Tocchet	RW
22	(Canada)	Gary Roberts	LW
25	(United States)	Kevin Stevens	LW
32	(United States)	Peter Taglianetti	D
35	(United States)	Warren Young	C
Coaches: Eddie Johnston, Randy Hillier and Pierre Larouche. Honorary GM was Jack Riley.

== Documentary ==
HBO aired a four-part documentary chronicling the preparation of the two teams for the game as part of its award-winning sports series 24/7. The first episode aired on Wednesday, December 15, 2010 at 10 p.m. ET, with three additional episodes following each subsequent Wednesday. The series chronicled each team's seasons leading up to the Winter Classic, and emphasized the rivalry between Crosby and Ovechkin and between the Penguins and Capitals.

The series served as inspiration for Canadian author Rachel Reid to write her 2019 novel Heated Rivalry, which was adapted into a television series of the same name in 2025.

== Associated games ==
The week leading up to the Winter Classic featured a number of hockey-related events. On Thursday, December 30, 2010, the Robert Morris Colonials and the RIT Tigers men's varsity hockey teams met at the Consol Energy Center in downtown Pittsburgh for an Atlantic Hockey league match. The college game was followed that evening by an American Hockey League matchup between the Wilkes-Barre/Scranton Penguins and the Hershey Bears, the top minor-league affiliates of the Pittsburgh Penguins and the Washington Capitals, respectively.

== Entertainment ==
During the first intermission, The Clarks performed near the ice. Jimmy Fallon introduced the band prior to their performance. The rock band Styx appeared during the second intermission performing "Renegade", a fan-favorite at Steelers games.

== See also ==
- 2010–11 Pittsburgh Penguins season
- 2010–11 Washington Capitals season
- 2011 Heritage Classic
- List of outdoor ice hockey games
- List of ice hockey games with highest attendance
- Capitals–Penguins rivalry
