= Mike Knuble =

Canadian-American ice hockey player (born 1972)

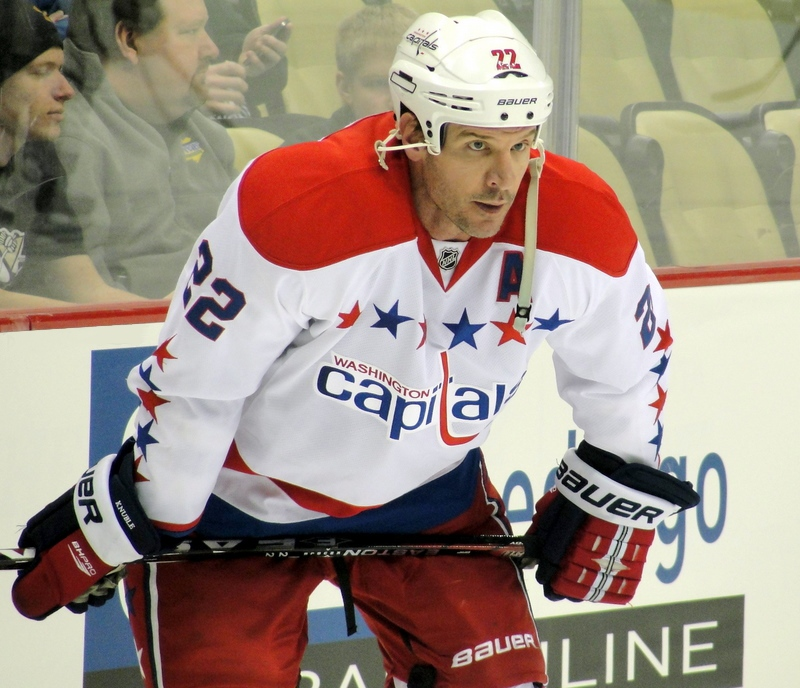
- Knuble with the Washington Capitals in January 2012
- Born: July 4, 1972 (age 54) Toronto, Ontario, Canada
- Height: 6 ft 3 in (191 cm)
- Weight: 235 lb (107 kg; 16 st 11 lb)
- Position: Right wing
- Shot: Right
- Played for: Detroit Red Wings; New York Rangers; Boston Bruins; Philadelphia Flyers; Washington Capitals
- National team: United States
- NHL draft: 76th overall, 1991; Detroit Red Wings
- Playing career: 1995–2013

Michael Rudolf Knuble (/kɪˈnuːbəl/ ki-NOO-bəl, Latvian: Maikls Rūdolfs Knuble; born July 4, 1972) is a Canadian-born American former professional ice hockey right winger who played in the National Hockey League (NHL). During his 16 NHL seasons, he played for the Detroit Red Wings, New York Rangers, Boston Bruins, Philadelphia Flyers and Washington Capitals.

He was a member of Detroit's 1997–98 Stanley Cup championship team, and was a part of the organization during their 1996–97 Stanley Cup. He is the only person who was an NHL teammate with both Wayne Gretzky and Alex Ovechkin.

== Playing career ==
=== Collegiate ===
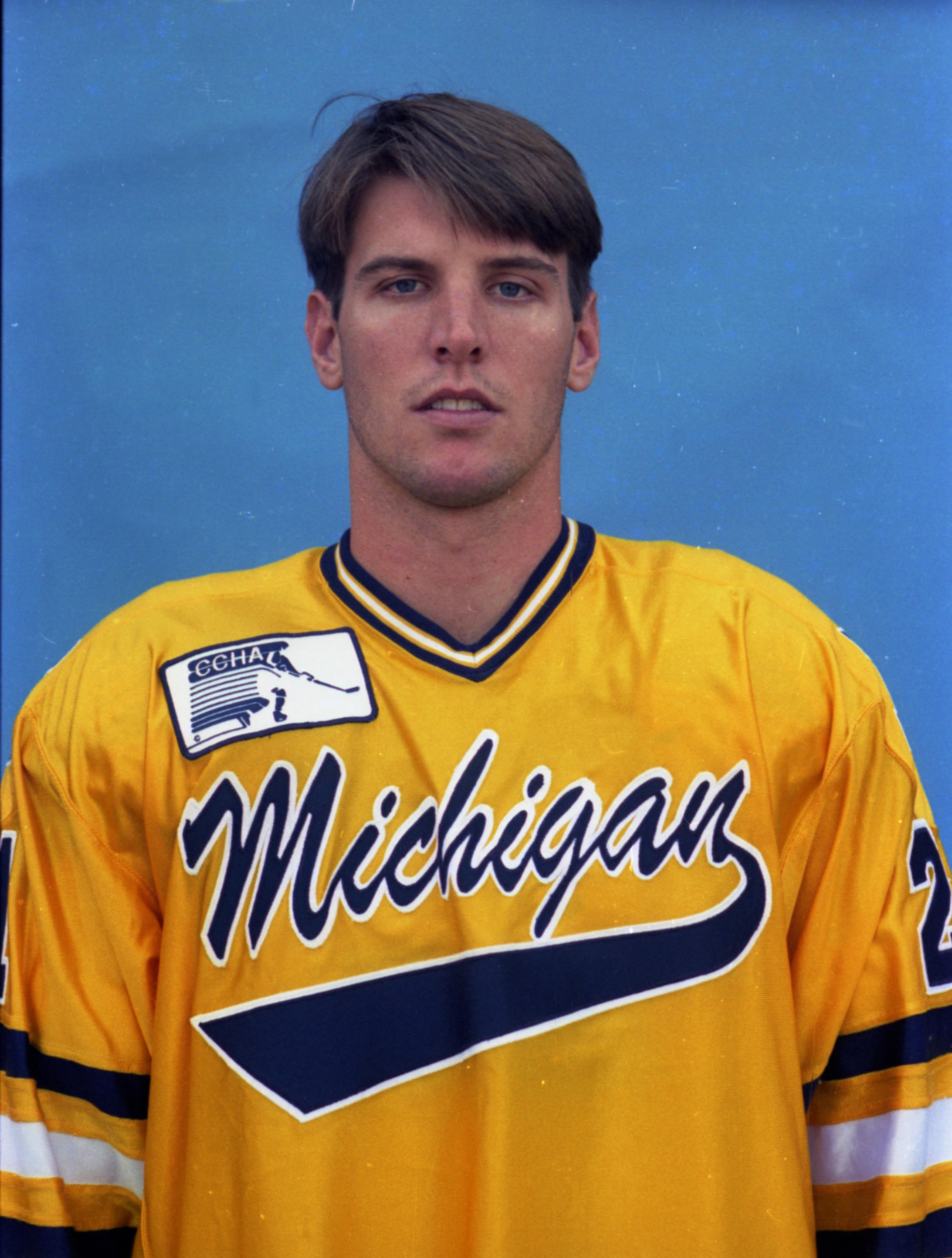
Knuble c. 1994-95

Knuble was drafted in the fourth round, 76th overall, by the Detroit Red Wings in the 1991 NHL entry draft. He played the next four years at the University of Michigan and was given Second Team CCHA All-Star honors in 1994 and 1995 and NCAA West All-American Team honors in 1995. Following his collegiate career, he made his professional debut in the 1995 Calder Cup playoffs with the Adirondack Red Wings of the American Hockey League (AHL).

=== Professional ===
Knuble spent the entire 1995–96 season and most of the 1996–97 season with the Adirondack Red Wings in the AHL before making his NHL debut with the Detroit Red Wings on March 26, 1997. His debut came against the Colorado Avalanche in the famous "Fight Night at the Joe" match. He played a total of nine regular season games in 1996–97 and none in the 1997 Stanley Cup playoffs. Detroit won the Stanley Cup that season, but Knuble's name was not engraved on the Cup since he had not played enough games. However, Detroit swept the Washington Capitals, a team Knuble eventually joined, to repeat as Cup Champions in 1997–98, his first full season in the NHL, and though he only played three playoff games, he met the necessary requirements to have his name engraved on the Cup. Knuble was included on both Stanley Cup winning team pictures in 1997 and 1998.

Prior to the 1998–99 season, Detroit traded Knuble to the New York Rangers for a 2000 second-round draft choice (Tomáš Kopecký). Knuble played in all 82 games with the Rangers that season, recording 15 goals and 20 assists. With a month to go in the 1999–2000 season, the Rangers traded him to the Boston Bruins in exchange for Rob DiMaio. After posting 20 points in 82 games in 2000–01 and 14 points in 54 games in 2001–02, Knuble found himself playing left wing on a line with Joe Thornton and Glen Murray beginning in 2002–03. He scored 30 goals and 29 assists in 75 games, good for third on the Bruins.

Knuble enjoyed another solid season in 2003–04, 21 goals and 25 assists in 82 games with the Bruins. During which, he set the NHL record for the fastest two goals to start a game by one player on February 14 against the Florida Panthers. He scored a goal ten seconds into the first period and followed it up with another just 27 seconds into the game. After the season, Knuble signed a three-year contract with the Philadelphia Flyers in the off-season. He then played for Linköpings HC of the Swedish Elitserien during the 2004–05 NHL lockout, scoring 26 goals and assisting on 13 others in 49 games.

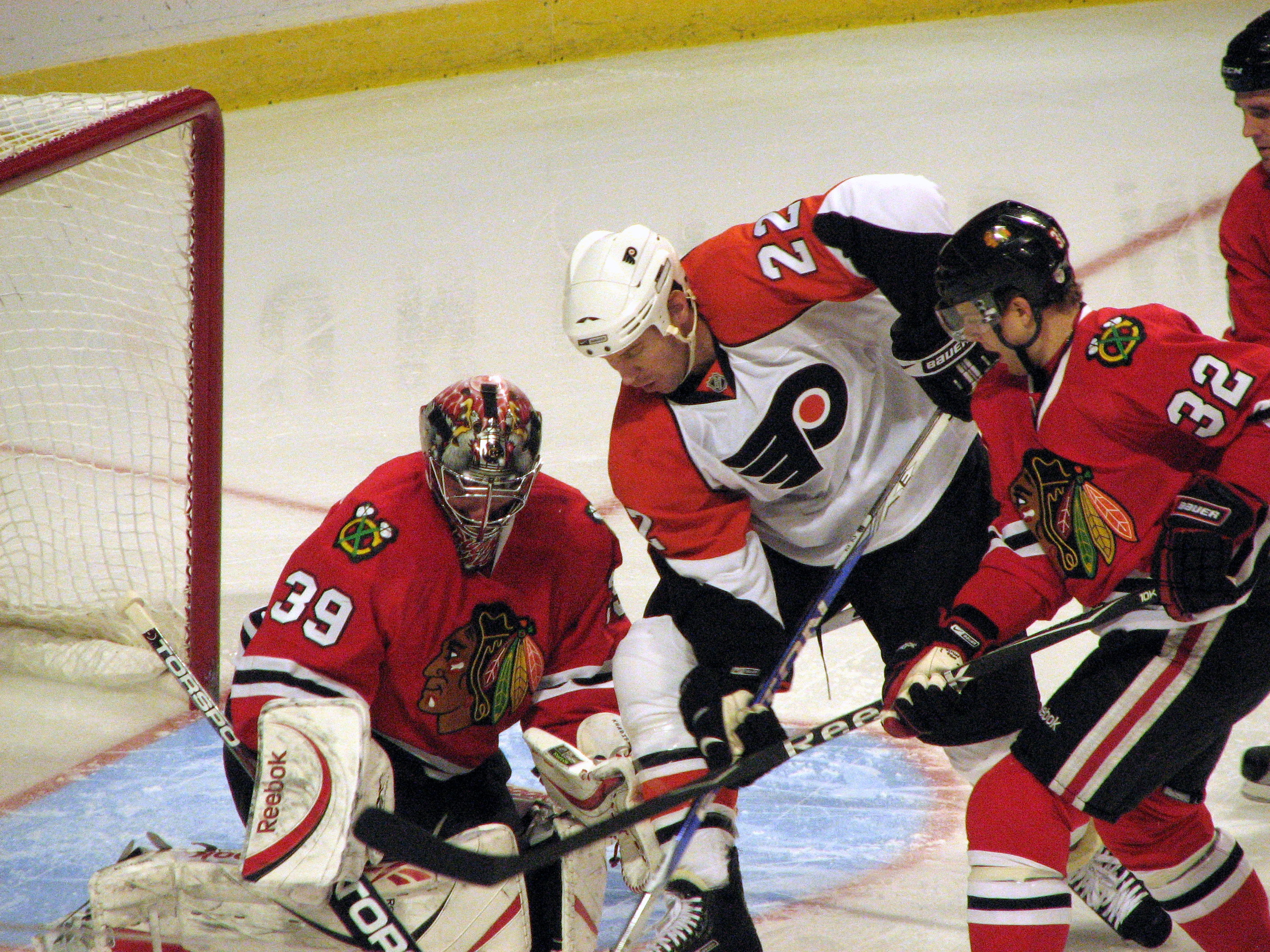
Knuble (22) as a member of the Philadelphia Flyers battling with Kris Versteeg and Nikolai Khabibulin in December 2008.

When the lockout came to an end, Knuble was slotted to play right wing on a line with Simon Gagné and Peter Forsberg, a line which was later nicknamed the "Deuces Wild Line." He responded with his best season as a professional in 2005–06, recording career highs in goals (34), assists (31) and points (65). On pace to duplicate his numbers despite his team's poor season in 2006–07, Knuble's season was nearly cut short after a collision with Rangers forward and former Red Wings teammate Brendan Shanahan. After missing a month of action, he returned to the ice and finished with 24 goals and 30 assists in 64 games and brought his plus-minus rating to +2, Knuble being one of two Flyers (Gagné being the other) to finish with a plus rating for the season.

Knuble recorded his first career hat trick on February 2, 2008, scoring all the goals in a 3–0 Flyers win over the Anaheim Ducks. He netted his first career playoff overtime goal (and fifth-to-last goal as a Flyer) on April 17, 2008, to eliminate the Washington Capitals in game seven of the first round of the 2008 Stanley Cup playoffs on the road, 4–3, preventing them from completing a 3–1 series comeback. He has traveled to schools in New Jersey and Philadelphia teaching kids about hockey in his free time.

On July 1, 2009, Knuble signed a two-year deal worth $2.8 million a season with the Washington Capitals, whom he had eliminated twice in his playoff career. On November 13, 2009, in a game against the Minnesota Wild, Knuble broke a finger in the first period and did not finish the game. He returned on December 11 after missing four weeks of action. Later that season, Knuble scored the game-winning goal in both home games against the rival and defending Stanley Cup champion Pittsburgh Penguins after regulation, a 5–4 come-from-behind OT win on February 7, 2010, during a power play and a 4–3 shootout win on March 24, 2010, in which he scored his first career shootout goal to give Washington its second-ever shootout win against Pittsburgh.

Knuble scored Washington's first goal in the second period of the 2011 NHL Winter Classic against Penguins' goaltender Marc-André Fleury.

On April 11, 2011, Knuble was re-signed to a one-year, $2 million contract extension with the Capitals. During the 2011–12 season, on December 20, 2011, Knuble played in his 1,000th NHL game. At that time, Knuble had scored 221 NHL goals since turning age 30.

On January 24, 2013, Knuble signed a one-year deal to return to the Philadelphia Flyers. During the lockout-shortened 2012–13 NHL season, Knuble wanted to play near his hometown and sought to play for the Chicago Blackhawks or even the Red Wings again, but neither team had room for him. Thus, he contemplated leaving the league for the AHL's Grand Rapids Griffins, which he ultimately did.

== Coaching ==
Knuble is currently an assistant coach with the AHL's Grand Rapids Griffins, the Detroit Red Wings' minor league affiliate.

== Personal life ==
Born in Toronto, Ontario, Knuble was raised with younger brother Steve in Kentwood, Michigan, by his Latvian-born parents, Aivars and Māra (Miesnieks) Knuble. Because he was born in Canada, Mike has dual Canadian/American citizenship. His father Aivars died of a heart attack at the age of 45 in 1987 when Mike was 15 years old.

Knuble is married to wife Megan. Together they have three children. Cam Knuble was playing hockey in the USHL with the Muskegon Lumberjacks in January 2018. Cole Knuble was drafted by the Philadelphia Flyers in 2023 and has made his NHL debut.

Mike's brother Steve, who attended Michigan State University, lives in Huntsville, Alabama, but has run a hockey clinic in Ann Arbor, Michigan, since 1996.

The Knuble family is currently living in Grand Rapids, Michigan, where Mike was raised.

== Awards and honors ==
| Award | Year |
|---|---|
| All-CCHA Second Team | 1993–94 |
| All-CCHA Second Team | 1994–95 |
| AHCA West Second-Team All-American | 1994–95 |

- 1997–98: Stanley Cup Detroit Red Wings (NHL)
- 2006–07: Yanick Dupre Memorial

== Career statistics ==
=== Regular season and playoffs ===
| | | | Regular season | | | | | Playoffs |
| Season | Team | League | GP | G | A | Pts | PIM | GP | G | A | Pts | PIM |
|---|---|---|---|---|---|---|---|---|---|---|---|---|
| 1988–89 | East Kentwood High School | HS-MI | 28 | 52 | 37 | 89 | 60 | — | — | — | — | — |
| 1989–90 | East Kentwood High School | HS-MI | 29 | 63 | 40 | 103 | 40 | — | — | — | — | — |
| 1990–91 | Kalamazoo Jr. K-Wings | NAHL | 36 | 18 | 24 | 42 | 30 | — | — | — | — | — |
| 1991–92 | University of Michigan | CCHA | 43 | 7 | 8 | 15 | 48 | — | — | — | — | — |
| 1992–93 | University of Michigan | CCHA | 39 | 26 | 16 | 42 | 57 | — | — | — | — | — |
| 1993–94 | University of Michigan | CCHA | 41 | 32 | 26 | 58 | 71 | — | — | — | — | — |
| 1994–95 | University of Michigan | CCHA | 34 | 38 | 22 | 60 | 62 | — | — | — | — | — |
| 1994–95 | Adirondack Red Wings | AHL | — | — | — | — | — | 3 | 0 | 0 | 0 | 0 |
| 1995–96 | Adirondack Red Wings | AHL | 80 | 22 | 23 | 45 | 59 | 3 | 1 | 0 | 1 | 0 |
| 1996–97 | Adirondack Red Wings | AHL | 68 | 28 | 35 | 63 | 54 | — | — | — | — | — |
| 1996–97 | Detroit Red Wings | NHL | 9 | 1 | 0 | 1 | 0 | — | — | — | — | — |
| 1997–98 | Detroit Red Wings | NHL | 53 | 7 | 6 | 13 | 16 | 3 | 0 | 1 | 1 | 0 |
| 1998–99 | New York Rangers | NHL | 82 | 15 | 20 | 35 | 26 | — | — | — | — | — |
| 1999–2000 | New York Rangers | NHL | 59 | 9 | 5 | 14 | 18 | — | — | — | — | — |
| 1999–2000 | Boston Bruins | NHL | 14 | 3 | 3 | 6 | 8 | — | — | — | — | — |
| 2000–01 | Boston Bruins | NHL | 82 | 7 | 13 | 20 | 37 | — | — | — | — | — |
| 2001–02 | Boston Bruins | NHL | 54 | 8 | 6 | 14 | 88 | 2 | 0 | 0 | 0 | 0 |
| 2002–03 | Boston Bruins | NHL | 75 | 30 | 29 | 59 | 45 | 5 | 0 | 2 | 2 | 2 |
| 2003–04 | Boston Bruins | NHL | 82 | 21 | 25 | 46 | 32 | 7 | 2 | 0 | 2 | 0 |
| 2004–05 | Linköpings HC | SEL | 49 | 26 | 13 | 39 | 40 | 6 | 0 | 1 | 1 | 2 |
| 2005–06 | Philadelphia Flyers | NHL | 82 | 34 | 31 | 65 | 80 | 6 | 1 | 3 | 4 | 8 |
| 2006–07 | Philadelphia Flyers | NHL | 64 | 24 | 30 | 54 | 56 | — | — | — | — | — |
| 2007–08 | Philadelphia Flyers | NHL | 82 | 29 | 26 | 55 | 72 | 12 | 3 | 4 | 7 | 6 |
| 2008–09 | Philadelphia Flyers | NHL | 82 | 27 | 20 | 47 | 62 | 6 | 2 | 1 | 3 | 2 |
| 2009–10 | Washington Capitals | NHL | 69 | 29 | 24 | 53 | 59 | 7 | 2 | 4 | 6 | 6 |
| 2010–11 | Washington Capitals | NHL | 79 | 24 | 16 | 40 | 36 | 6 | 2 | 0 | 2 | 8 |
| 2011–12 | Washington Capitals | NHL | 72 | 6 | 12 | 18 | 32 | 11 | 2 | 1 | 3 | 6 |
| 2012–13 | Grand Rapids Griffins | AHL | 1 | 0 | 1 | 1 | 0 | — | — | — | — | — |
| 2012–13 | Philadelphia Flyers | NHL | 28 | 4 | 4 | 8 | 20 | — | — | — | — | — |
| NHL totals | | | 1,068 | 278 | 270 | 548 | 641 | 65 | 14 | 16 | 30 | 38 |

=== International ===
| Year | Team | Event | GP | G | A | Pts | PIM |
|---|---|---|---|---|---|---|---|
| 1995 | United States | WC | 6 | 1 | 2 | 3 | 2 |
| 1999 | United States | WC | 6 | 0 | 0 | 0 | 10 |
| 2001 | United States | WC | 9 | 2 | 0 | 2 | 2 |
| 2005 | United States | WC | 7 | 4 | 2 | 6 | 8 |
| 2006 | United States | OG | 6 | 1 | 1 | 2 | 4 |
| Senior totals | | | 34 | 8 | 5 | 13 | 26 |

== See also ==
- List of NHL players with 1,000 games played
