= Capitals–Penguins rivalry =

National Hockey League rivalry

- The Capitals and Penguins in game seven of the 2017 Stanley Cup playoffs second round

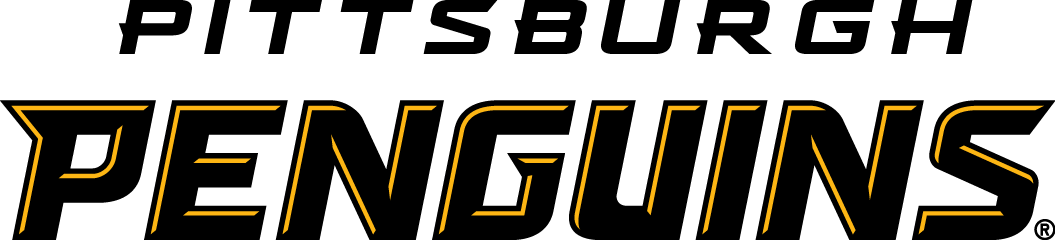
- Washington Capitals Pittsburgh Penguins
- First meeting: November 16, 1974
- Latest meeting: October 7, 2026
- Next meeting: January 18, 2027

Statistics
- Total meetings: 323
- All-time series: 166–134–16–7 (PIT)
- Regular season series: 126–106–16–7 (PIT)
- Postseason results: 40–28 (PIT)
- Largest victory: PIT 12–1 WSH; March 15, 1975
- Longest win streak: WSH W9
- Current win streak: WSH W3

Postseason history
- 1991 division finals: Penguins won, 4–1; 1992 division semifinals: Penguins won, 4–3; 1994 conference quarterfinals: Capitals won, 4–2; 1995 conference quarterfinals: Penguins won, 4–3; 1996 conference quarterfinals: Penguins won, 4–2; 2000 conference quarterfinals: Penguins won, 4–1; 2001 conference quarterfinals: Penguins won, 4–2; 2009 conference semifinals: Penguins won, 4–3; 2016 second round: Penguins won, 4–2; 2017 second round: Penguins won, 4–3; 2018 second round: Capitals won, 4–2

The Capitals–Penguins rivalry is a National Hockey League (NHL) rivalry between the Washington Capitals and Pittsburgh Penguins. Both teams have played in the Metropolitan Division of the Eastern Conference since 2013. This rivalry stems from the 11 playoff series that the two teams have met in, which is second most between NHL expansion teams behind the Dallas Stars and St. Louis Blues (who have met each other in 14 playoff series). Pittsburgh won in every series except for the 1994 Eastern Conference quarterfinals and 2018 Eastern Conference second round. There is also only a 250-mile drive between the cities of Washington, D.C., and Pittsburgh, allowing visiting fans of both teams to attend each other's games in fairly large quantities. In addition to the geography and deep playoff history, the emergence of Alexander Ovechkin (Washington) and Sidney Crosby (Pittsburgh) as two generational talents has fueled the rivalry. The rivalry reached new heights in the mid and late 2010s, as the teams won three consecutive Stanley Cups between them – in 2016 and 2017, the Penguins defeated the Presidents' Trophy-winning Capitals en route to the championship, while in 2018 the Capitals eliminated the two-time defending champions in the second round on their way to winning their first Stanley Cup. All six Stanley Cup championships combined between Washington and Pittsburgh have required defeating each other in the playoffs.

== History ==
=== Early years ===
Starting in the early 1980s, Pittsburgh and Washington had developed some animosity towards each other, but their matchup was never considered one of the top rivalries because they were rarely good at the same time. The two teams had never even made it to the playoffs in the same year until 1989 when the Capitals lost to the Penguins' cross-state rivals, the Philadelphia Flyers, in the division semifinals and the Penguins lost to the Flyers in the division finals. The next season, the Capitals and Penguins went in opposite directions. The Capitals finished third in the Patrick Division and made it to the Wales Conference finals against the Boston Bruins (but lost that series 4–0), while the Penguins did not even make the playoffs.

=== 1990s and early 2000s ===
The 1990–91 season marked the start of the rivalry. Pittsburgh and Washington finished first and third in the Patrick Division, respectively. The Penguins won a tight division semifinal series against the New Jersey Devils in seven games while the Capitals finished off the New York Rangers in six games. In the division finals, the Capitals won game one in Pittsburgh, 4–2. The Penguins went on to win the next three games, starting with a high-scoring 7–6 OT affair in game two, followed by two 3–1 victories in Washington. Pittsburgh would close out the series in game five with a 4–1 victory. They would go on to win the conference finals against Boston and the Stanley Cup Final against the Minnesota North Stars, winning both series in six games.

In 1991–92, the Capitals finished second in the division and the entire NHL, and the Penguins finished third. This set up a second consecutive playoff meeting between the two teams. This time, the Capitals took a 3–1 series lead by winning games one and two on their home ice and then followed a game three loss with a 7–2 drubbing of the Penguins in Pittsburgh. Dino Ciccarelli scored four goals in that game and was one of five Washington players to have a multi-point game that night. The Penguins would not give up, responding with a 5–2 win in game five in Landover. Pittsburgh then won both games six and seven by two goals each to win the series in seven games. After this series, the Penguins would defeat the New York Rangers in the Patrick Division finals and win eleven consecutive games to their second Stanley Cup.

The 1992–93 season would see both teams capture the top two spots in the Patrick Division. Pittsburgh won the division with a franchise record 119 points in the regular season, including an NHL-record 17-game winning streak. However, the third-place team in the division, the New York Islanders, would upset both Washington and Pittsburgh in the division semifinals and finals, respectively, thus preventing a third consecutive Capitals–Penguins playoff matchup.

Before the 1993–94 season, the NHL renamed its divisions and made minor realignments. Pittsburgh was placed in the Northeast Division (formerly known as the Adams Division), while Washington remained in the newly named Atlantic Division that was formerly known as the Patrick Division. In spite of the divisional realignment, the two teams met once again in the Stanley Cup playoffs in the first round. The Penguins won the Northeast Division and earned the second seed in the newly named Eastern Conference (formerly the Wales Conference), while the Capitals earned the seventh seed. Unlike the previous two meetings, it was the Capitals that won the series 4–2. Washington won game one in Pittsburgh and the next five games were won by the home team. Joé Juneau and Michal Pivoňka of the Capitals would post identical stats over the course of the series (three goals and four assists in six games). The Capitals were unable to duplicate their first round success in the conference semifinals, falling to the Presidents' Trophy-winning (and eventual champion) New York Rangers in five games.

After the lockout-shortened 1994–95 season, the two teams met again in first round, with the Penguins earning the third seed in the Eastern Conference while the Capitals earned the sixth seed. Just like the year prior, the Capitals won game one in Pittsburgh, and won two of the next three games to take a 3–1 series lead. This time, however, the Penguins responded with three straight wins, starting with an overtime win in game five at Civic Arena. This gave Pittsburgh a 4–3 series win. Pittsburgh center Ron Francis scored three goals and tallied 11 assists during the series. The eventual Stanley Cup champion, New Jersey Devils, went on to defeat the Penguins in the conference semifinals, 4–1.

Pittsburgh and Washington met once again in the conference quarterfinals in the 1996 playoffs as the second and seventh seeds in the East, respectively. The Capitals shocked the Penguins and won the first two games of the series in Pittsburgh by two goals each, but the Penguins won game three by a 4–1 score. Petr Nedvěd scored in the fourth overtime period of game four to tie the series at two games apiece. Pittsburgh won games five and six to take the series in six games. They also went on to beat the Rangers in the conference semifinals, but lost game seven of the Eastern Conference finals to the Florida Panthers.

Before the 1998–99 season, the NHL realigned its divisions once more. However, the Capitals and Penguins remained interdivisional opponents, as the Penguins were placed in the new Atlantic Division and the Capitals were placed in the new Southeast Division.

The two rivals did not meet in the playoffs again until 2000. Washington won the Southeast Division title and earned the second seed in the East, while Pittsburgh qualified as the seventh seed. Unlike the other series in the playoffs, this matchup was played with a 1–2–2–1–1 format (team with home ice advantage plays games one, four, five, and seven at home) because Pittsburgh's arena was unavailable for 7 of 14 days listed by the NHL and ABC-TV's request to televise game two. This special format caused many Capitals fans to feel irate, fearing the new format would put the team at a serious disadvantage, being in a 3–0 series hole when they returned home for game four. These worries came true after the Penguins won the first three games in the series, starting with a 7–0 win at the MCI Center. The next four games were all close as each of them were decided by one goal. Washington won game four at home, but lost in game five marking their fifth playoff series loss to the Pittsburgh Penguins.

In the 2000–01 season, the Capitals won a weak Southeast Division once more and earned the third seed in the conference as the worst-ranked division winner, while the Penguins earned the sixth seed. In the first round, the Capitals started the series with a 1–0 win over the Penguins, but lost the next two games. Game four in Pittsburgh went to overtime, and Jeff Halpern scored for Washington, their first even strength goal in the series to tie the series at two heading back to D.C. However, Pittsburgh responded with a 2–1 win in games five and six (with game six being ended in overtime by Martin Straka), thus defeating the Capitals once again. In addition, the Capitals scored only three even strength goals in the entire series. The Penguins went to the Eastern Conference finals before they were defeated in five games by the Devils.

=== 2001–2006 ===
Following the 2001 playoff encounter, the Penguins traded esteemed forward Jaromír Jágr to the rival Capitals, with whom he then signed a seven-season contract. Despite the trade, the rivalry cooled off and Jágr did not live up to the Capitals' expectations as he led them to just one playoff appearance in the 2003 Stanley Cup playoffs, where they lost to the Tampa Bay Lightning in the first round, while Pittsburgh missed the playoffs altogether for several more seasons. The misfortunes of the two teams in the regular season would earn them the ability to draft high-end talent. Alexander Semin (13th overall, 2002), Alexander Ovechkin (first overall, 2004), and Nicklas Bäckström (fourth overall, 2006), were drafted by the Capitals, while Ryan Whitney (fifth overall, 2002), Marc-André Fleury (first overall, 2003), Evgeni Malkin (second overall, 2004), Sidney Crosby (first overall, 2005), Jordan Staal (second overall, 2006) and Kris Letang (62nd overall, 2005) were drafted by the Penguins. These players did their part in quickly turning the fortunes of their respective teams around. Crosby and Ovechkin, the most highly touted player on each team, first met on November 22, 2005, with Crosby getting a goal and an assist and Ovechkin getting an assist. The Penguins won 5–4. The two phenoms lived up to their expectations, as they tallied 106 (Ovechkin) and 103 points (Crosby) to finish third and sixth in the NHL scoring race, respectively. However, both teams missed the playoffs that year. Ovechkin's 52 goals placed him third all-time for goals scored by a rookie in a single regular season, behind Teemu Selanne (76) and Mike Bossy (53)

=== 2006–2008 ===
In 2006–07, Crosby notched 36 goals and 84 assists (120 points) to lead the league in points and win the Art Ross Trophy. Ovechkin had a strong season as well, scoring 46 goals and 46 assists (92 points). The Penguins would improve much more quickly than the Capitals, as they secured their first playoff spot since 2001 by defeating the Capitals in their final meeting of the year. They were unable to find much success in the playoffs, as they were handed a 4–1 series loss to the stronger, much more experienced Ottawa Senators in the conference quarterfinals.

The 2007–08 season saw both teams make the playoffs in the same year for the first time since 2001. The Capitals lost to the Philadelphia Flyers in the conference quarterfinals in seven games preventing a conference semifinals matchup with the Penguins. Pittsburgh made it to the 2008 Stanley Cup Final against the Detroit Red Wings (defeating the Flyers in the conference finals), only to lose the series 4–2.

=== 2008–09: Crosby and Ovechkin's first playoff meeting ===
The rivalry reached new heights in 2008–09. The Capitals finished as the second-best team in the Eastern Conference, while the Penguins finished as the fourth. All three of the League's three leading scorers during the regular season played for either Washington or Pittsburgh (Evgeni Malkin, 113 points; Alexander Ovechkin, 110 points; Sidney Crosby, 103 points). In the playoffs, the Capitals defeated the New York Rangers 4–3 in the conference quarterfinals, while the Penguins defeated their Pennsylvania rivals, the Flyers, in six games. With the first (Boston Bruins), second (Washington Capitals), fourth (Pittsburgh Penguins), and sixth (Carolina Hurricanes) seeds remaining in the East, this set up the eighth playoff meeting between the Capitals and the Penguins.

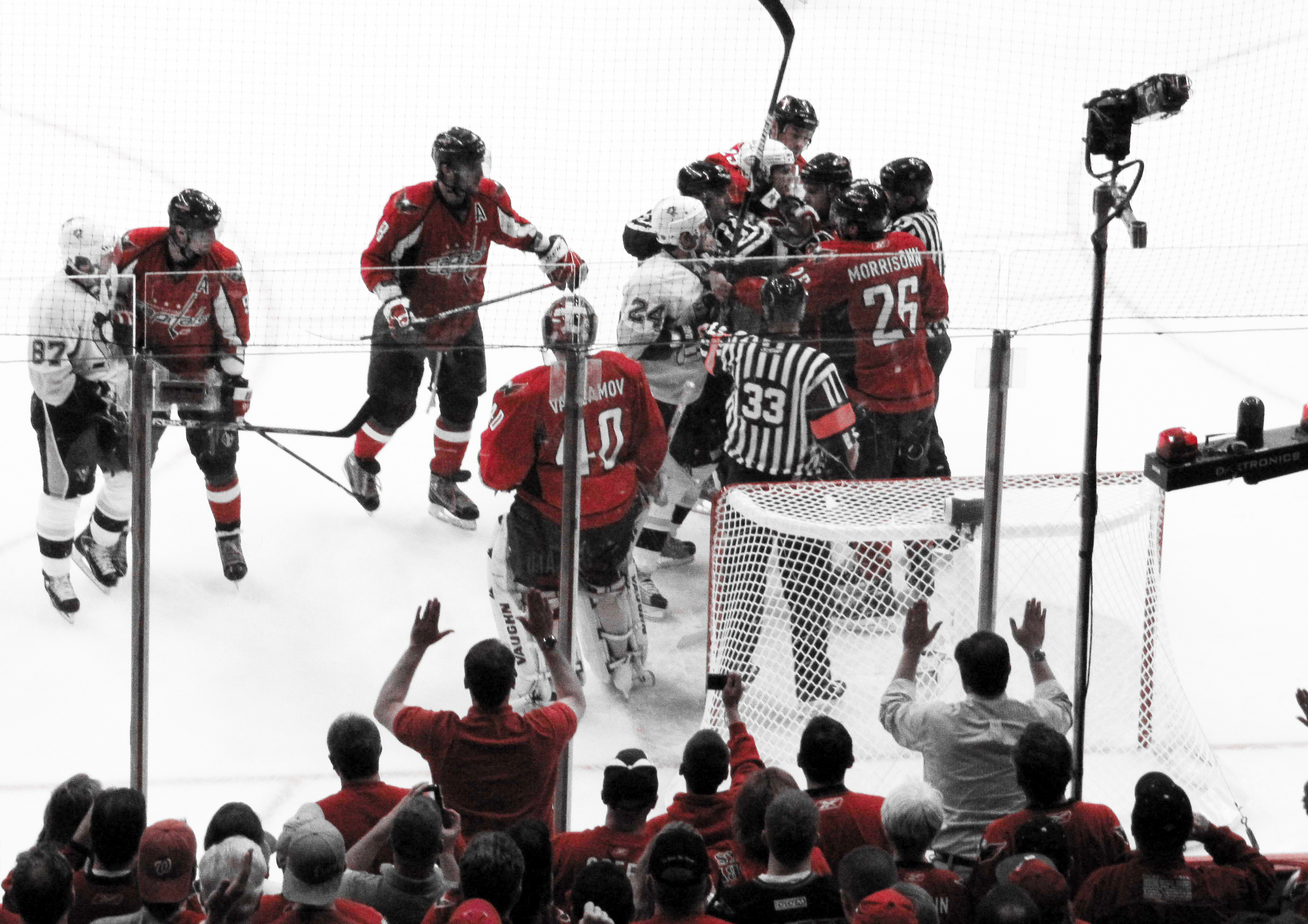
An altercation between the Capitals and the Penguins during the 2009 playoffs.

The 2009 series began in Washington. Sidney Crosby opened the scoring on a wrist shot in the first period, only to have Capitals center Dave Steckel tie the game later on. Pittsburgh later found themselves trying to kill a five-on-three penalty, and Washington capitalized on it on a goal by Alexander Ovechkin assisted by Alex Semin to take a 2–1 lead. Mark Eaton tied the score at two a little over halfway into the game, but it was Tomáš Fleischmann who scored the only goal of the third period to give Washington a 3–2 win and a 1–0 series lead. Game two proved to be one of the most notable games in Capitals-Penguins playoff history, as Crosby and Ovechkin both scored hat-tricks in the game. Steckel was the only other player in the game to score a goal, thus giving Washington a 4–3 win (with Ovechkin's third goal being the winning goal) and a 2–0 series lead with the series shifting to Pittsburgh.

In game three, Washington got the start they wanted, as Ovechkin opened the scoring for the Capitals. Fellow Russian Evgeni Malkin and Ukrainian Ruslan Fedotenko scored in the second and third period, respectively, to give the Penguins a 2–1 lead in the game. With 1:23 left in regulation, Nicklas Bäckström tied the game for Washington. The Capitals were unable to build off of his goal in overtime, as Penguins' defenseman Kris Letang's shot deflected off Capitals' defenseman Shaone Morrisonn past goaltender Semyon Varlamov and into the net to give Pittsburgh a 3–2 overtime win and cut Washington's series lead in half. In game four, Washington scored first once more (from Nicklas Bäckström assisted by Alex Semin), but just like the previous game, Pittsburgh took the lead, this time from a power play goal by Sergei Gonchar and even-strength goals from Bill Guerin and Ruslan Fedotenko. Winger Chris Clark scored in the second period for Washington to make it 3–2. The Capitals and Penguins traded goals until the end of the game for a 5–3 final score in favor of Pittsburgh. The series was tied 2–2 heading back to the Verizon Center.

A Yanni concert in Pittsburgh had forced the two teams to play games four and five on back-to-back days. Game five started with Steckel missing a wide-open net 19 seconds into the first period; the two teams got into a scrum at the end of the period. Alexander Ovechkin and John Erskine of Washington and Brooks Orpik and Evgeni Malkin of Pittsburgh all received roughing penalties. In the second period, Jordan Staal scored for Pittsburgh. Ovechkin responded with his ninth goal of the playoffs to tie the score at one; he followed that with assisting on Bäckström's power play goal to put Washington ahead, 2–1. Fedotenko and Matt Cooke both scored to put Pittsburgh ahead 3–2 in the third period, but then Ovechkin, with 4:08 remaining in regulation, tied the score at three with his second goal of the game and tenth goal of the playoffs (Bäckström assisted on his goal for his second point of the game). In overtime, Washington defenseman Milan Jurčina tripped Evgeni Malkin and got a penalty for it. This proved costly, as Malkin attempted a pass to Sidney Crosby which was broken up by Capitals' defenseman Tom Poti and deflected into the net past Semyon Varlamov to give Pittsburgh a 4–3 overtime win and a 3–2 series lead heading back to Mellon Arena. Game six began with a goal by Bill Guerin to give Pittsburgh a 1–0 lead 5:55 into the first period. Viktor Kozlov and Tomáš Fleischmann later scored to make it 2–1 in favor of Washington, however, Mark Eaton scored on the power play for Pittsburgh after Brian Pothier took an interference penalty. The Capitals and Penguins headed into the second intermission with game six tied at two. Pittsburgh and Washington started the third period by trading power play goals by Kris Letang and Brooks Laich, respectively, and then Kozlov scored at even strength to put the Capitals ahead by one. Sidney Crosby then scored with 4:18 remaining to tie the game at four. The game went to overtime and the series was on the line for Washington, but they still pulled through as Dave Steckel scored a goal assisted by Brooks Laich and Matt Bradley to force a seventh game back in D.C. Alexander Ovechkin finished the game with three assists.

For the third time in their storied playoff history, the Washington Capitals and Pittsburgh Penguins played a game seven against each other, with Pittsburgh having won both previous game sevens. It would prove to be a disastrous start for the Capitals as they fell behind 5–0 (Crosby and Malkin each got two points from Pittsburgh's five goals). Ovechkin spoiled the shutout on an unassisted goal in the second period, but then Crosby scored an unassisted goal of his own, this time on the power play and in the third period. Brooks Laich scored afterward, but the Penguins held on for a 6–2 game seven win to advance to the Eastern Conference finals. Crosby scored two goals and had an assist in the game to finish the series with 13 points (eight goals and five assists) while Ovechkin finished with 14 points (eight goals and six assists) in the series. The Penguins eventually played in the 2009 Stanley Cup Final against the Detroit Red Wings for the second consecutive season, and won that series in seven games to win their third Stanley Cup.

=== 2009–2015 ===
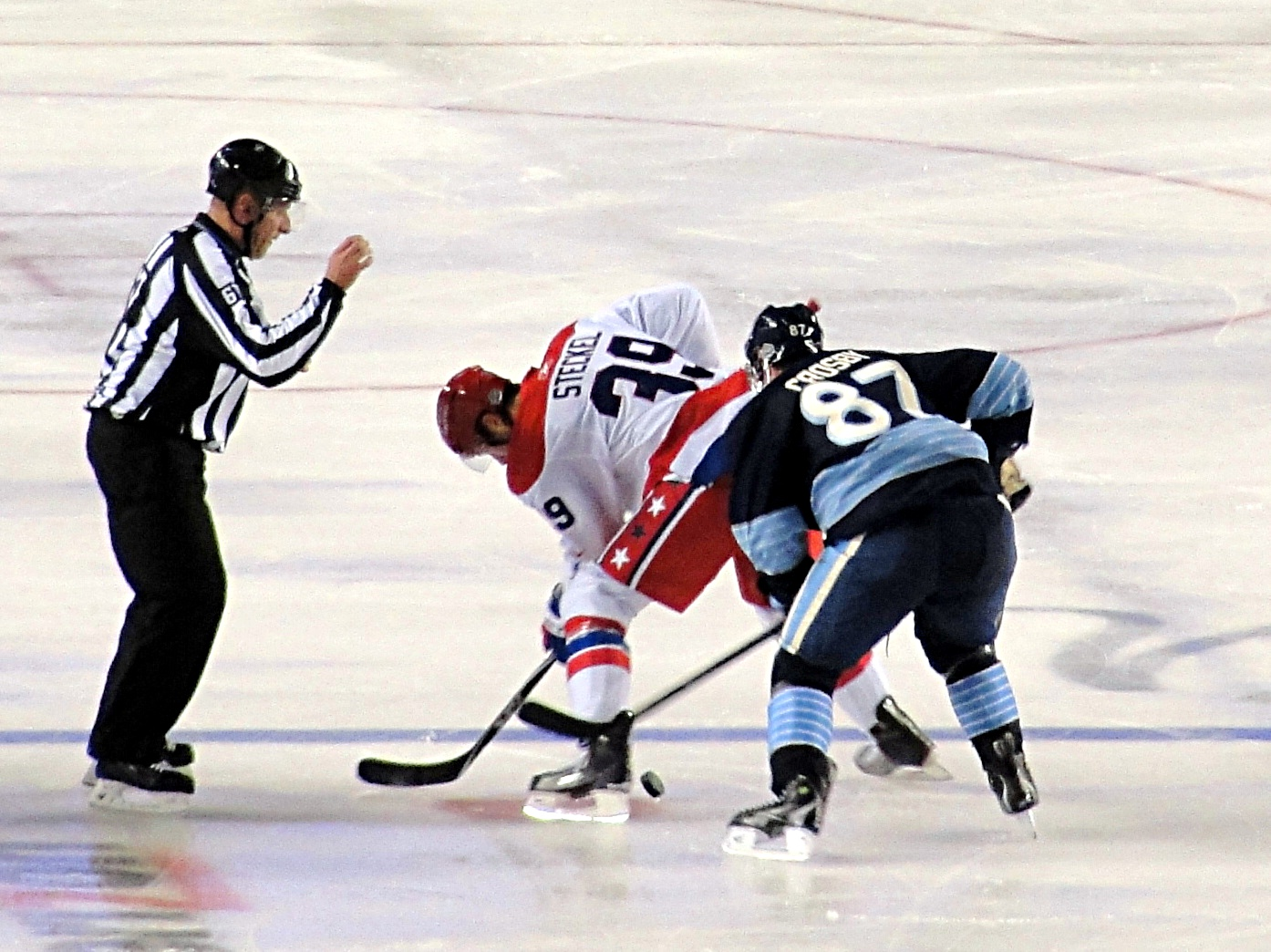
The two teams played at Heinz Field during the 2011 Winter Classic.

In May 2010, the NHL announced that the 2011 Winter Classic was going to be played by the Capitals and Penguins, with the game being held on New Year's Day of 2011 at Heinz Field in Pittsburgh. Pittsburgh scored first off an Evgeni Malkin breakaway in the second period before Washington rallied for three straight goals, including two by Eric Fehr. The Capitals held on to defeat the Penguins 3–1. This game is also notable for being the beginning of Sidney Crosby's concussion issues, as Capitals' center Dave Steckel clipped him in the head by accident behind the play. Crosby returned to the Penguins' lineup four days later against the Tampa Bay Lightning, but after getting hit by defenseman Victor Hedman, he did not play another game for ten months.

Washington and Pittsburgh would remain very competitive for the next few years, as the two teams combined for only one playoff-less season (Capitals in 2013–14) from 2009 to 2015. However, they never met in the playoffs during this time. They came close in 2011, but had the Penguins held their 3–1 series lead in the conference quarterfinals against Tampa Bay, they would have faced Washington in the next round.

Before the 2013–14 season, the NHL realigned into a two-conference, four-division setup. The Capitals and Penguins were both placed into the newly formed Metropolitan Division, making the two teams divisional rivals for the first time since the 1992–93 season. The NHL also changed its playoff format to make divisional playoff matchups more common. This ignited the rivalry for years to come.

=== 2015–2018: Consecutive playoff meetings ===
The Washington Capitals and Pittsburgh Penguins met in three straight playoffs, writing another chapter in their storied playoff history against each other. They were arguably the two best teams in the League, finishing as the top two teams in the Eastern Conference in back-to-back seasons from 2016 to 2017, and just the division in 2018. Also in 2017, both teams finished as the top two teams in the entire NHL for the 2016–17 season. Despite their high regular season finishes in the first two seasons, they have been paired as second round opponents all three times.

==== 2015–16 ====
In the 2015–16 season, Washington and Pittsburgh finished as the top two teams in their division and the Eastern Conference. Washington won the Presidents' Trophy with 120 points. In the first round, the Capitals beat the Flyers in six games, while the Penguins beat the Rangers in five games to set up the ninth playoff meeting between the Capitals and Penguins, and the first one in seven years.

In game one, Capitals left winger André Burakovsky opened the scoring off a rush a little over halfway through the first period only for Pittsburgh to bounce back in the second period with goals by defenseman Ben Lovejoy and center Evgeni Malkin. Right winger T. J. Oshie then tied the game for Washington later in the period and then scored less than nine minutes into the third to give his team a 3–2 lead. Their lead was relatively short-lived as Penguins center Nick Bonino evened the game about five minutes later sending game one into overtime. In the extra session, Oshie skated around the Penguins' goal with the puck for a wraparound chance, but goaltender Matt Murray got a piece of it. In referee Dan O'Rourke's eyes, the puck had crossed the line, so he signaled a goal the play then was under review, and after a closer look, the puck had gone over the line by the length of a stick blade, and the referees awarded the goal to the Capitals giving Oshie the hat-trick and Washington a 1–0 series lead. Game two was a tight, low-scoring affair and it was Pittsburgh who evened the series with a 2–1 win. Pittsburgh's goals were scored by left winger Carl Hagelin and former-Capital Eric Fehr, and Washington's only goal was scored by center Marcus Johansson. Capitals goaltender Braden Holtby made 35 saves, while his counterpart Matt Murray made only 23.

The series shifted to the Consol Energy Center for game three. The Penguins opened the game with first period goals from right wingers Patric Hörnqvist and Tom Kühnhackl to grab a 2–0 lead heading into the first intermission. Carl Hagelin added to the Penguins' lead with a goal in the second period for a 3–0 lead. Washington would try to comeback as Alexander Ovechkin and Justin Williams scored in the third period for the Capitals to cut Pittsburgh's lead to 3–2. That would turn out to be the final score of the game, giving the Penguins a 2–1 series lead. Pittsburgh's Kris Letang, however, was suspended for the next game for leaving his feet just before hitting Marcus Johansson. He was originally whistled for interference, and then was suspended one game by the NHL's Department of Player Safety for making Johansson's head the main point of contact. Game four began with a backhanded shot by center Jay Beagle that went over Matt Murray's shoulder to give the Capitals a 1–0 lead three minutes into the game. That lead lasted for about seven minutes, as Penguins' defenseman Trevor Daley scored a goal from a slapshot that deflected off Capitals' defenseman Karl Alzner and past Holtby to tie the game. Early in the second period, Pittsburgh center Matt Cullen scored after a lucky bounce off the boards that sent the puck on his stick to set him up for a breakaway goal. Later in the period, however, Washington tied the game after defenseman John Carlson roofed a shot past Murray and into the net. Late in the third period, Alzner received a penalty for high-sticking Sidney Crosby, but the Penguins could not capitalize and the game went to overtime. The sudden-death overtime period did not last long, as Hörnqvist scored for Pittsburgh 2:34 into overtime to give the Penguins a 3–2 win in the game and a 3–1 series lead. Pittsburgh had lost eight consecutive playoff overtimes prior to this game.

The Capitals could not afford to lose another game, as they faced elimination heading into game five. They got off to a good start in game five, grabbing a 1–0 lead off of an Ovechkin slapshot. The Penguins quickly responded with a goal from Chris Kunitz that was scored from a rebound in front of the net, but Washington regained the lead later on when Ovechkin assisted on Oshie's go-ahead goal that made the score 2–1. Justin Williams followed this by capitalizing on a Brian Dumoulin turnover to put the Capitals ahead, 3–1. There was no scoring in the third period, giving Washington a 3–1 win to keep their season alive.

In game six, the Capitals surrendered the first three goals of the game to Pittsburgh (scored twice by right winger Phil Kessel and once by Carl Hagelin). Oshie scored late in the second period to give Washington some life and make the score 3–1. Justin Williams and John Carlson both scored in the third period to tie the game for Washington after being down 3–0. The game went to overtime. Nick Bonino scored the overtime winner for the Penguins off a rebound in front of Capitals' goaltender Braden Holtby to give the Penguins a 4–3 win in the game and a 4–2 win in the series.

This was Pittsburgh's eighth playoff series win against the Capitals in nine meetings. Alexander Ovechkin of the Capitals and Carl Hagelin of the Penguins lead the series with seven points (two goals, five assists; and three goals, four assists, respectively) in six games. Pittsburgh went on to win their fourth Stanley Cup.

==== 2016–17 ====
the 2016–17 season saw the two rivals not only finish as the top two regular season teams in the division and Eastern Conference, but also the top two teams in the entire NHL. The Capitals won the Presidents' Trophy by having the best regular season record (55–19–8; 118 points), beating the Toronto Maple Leafs in the conference quarterfinals, while the Penguins finished with the second best record (50–21–11; 111 points) and defeated the Columbus Blue Jackets in their series. This marked the tenth Washington–Pittsburgh playoff series.

Game one was held at the Verizon Center in D.C. There was no scoring in the first period, but in the second period Penguins' captain Sidney Crosby scored two goals before two minutes had elapsed in the period. Before the second intermission, his star counterpart, Alexander Ovechkin, took a slapshot and blazed the puck past Fleury and into the cut the Pittsburgh lead in half. At the start of the third period, Evgeny Kuznetsov tied the game. Pittsburgh regained the lead after center Scott Wilson made a pass to Nick Bonino that sent him on a breakaway, which Bonino capitalized on with a wrist shot. Despite a flurry of Capitals chances to tie the game, the Penguins held on to win game one 3–2 and take a 1–0 series lead. Game two was won by Pittsburgh 6–2, behind two-goal performances from Phil Kessel and rookie Jake Guentzel, along with a goal by Matt Cullen and Evgeni Malkin. Nicklas Bäckström had two points for the Capitals. Holtby was pulled after stopping 11 of 14 shots, being replaced by backup Philipp Grubauer. Fleury stopped 34 of 36 shots for the Penguins in the game.

The Capitals headed to PPG Paints Arena in a 2–0 series hole. They got the start they wanted in game three as Bäckström put Washington ahead 1–0 in the first period on a five-on-three power play. It wasn't until the third period that the Capitals got an insurance goal with Kuznetsov's 2–0 goal 9:46 into the third period. With only a couple of minutes left in regulation, the Penguins were down by two goals and had been kept off the scoreboard, but that was short-lived, as Evgeni Malkin cut the Capitals' lead in half. That was followed by defenseman Justin Schultz firing the puck past Holtby to tie the game. Both of the Penguins' goals were scored while their own net was empty to make room for an extra skater. The Penguins headed into overtime with confidence, but their comeback fell short as Washington's defenseman Kevin Shattenkirk scored a power play goal in the extra session to cut Pittsburgh's series lead in half. This game was also noted for Capitals' defenseman Matt Niskanen's hit on Sidney Crosby; Niskanen was assessed five and a game misconduct. The NHL reviewed the hit, and deemed it not a dirty hit, so Niskanen did not face any discipline. In game four, the Penguins did not have Crosby in the lineup because of "concussion-related" symptoms. They did, however, jump out to a 2–0 lead after goals from Patric Hörnqvist in the first period and Jake Guentzel in the second period. The Capitals roared back with two second period goals of their own, scored 1:12 apart from Kuznetsov and defenseman Nate Schmidt. Later in the period, John Carlson was called for roughing, putting the Penguins on the power play. Pittsburgh capitalized on the man advantage, with Justin Schultz getting the power play goal. The game went down to the wire, as the score remained 3–2 with just over a minute to play. In the final minutes, Oshie was called for high-sticking Nick Bonino, however, replays showed that Oshie's stick never even touched Bonino's face; regardless, Bonino did not receive an embellishment call. The Penguins held on to win game four, 3–2, to take a 3–1 series lead heading into D.C. for game five.

The series shifted back to the Verizon Center for game five. With Sidney Crosby back in the lineup and the Penguins up 2–1 after two periods, they had a chance to close out the series and earn a trip back to the Eastern Conference finals, but it all went downhill for them starting from the puck drop for the third period. Nicklas Bäckström, Evgeny Kuznetsov, and Alexander Ovechkin scored to help the Capitals bounce back to win game five, 4–2, and send the series back to Western Pennsylvania for game six. Washington rode their momentum generated in game five into game six, as they tallied the first five goals of the game. John Carlson, T. J. Oshie, and Nicklas Bäckström scored once each for the Capitals, while André Burakovsky scored two. With Washington leading 5–0 with minutes left, Pittsburgh scored two goals, yet the Capitals still won 5–2. Braden Holtby made 16 saves on 18 shots to send the series to a decisive game seven on Washington ice.

For the fourth time in history, the Washington Capitals and Pittsburgh Penguins played a game seven against each other. The first period did not have any goals scored – Marc-André Fleury and his counterpart, Holtby, were having a solid game thus far. In the second period, the Penguins used a Washington turnover to generate a scoring chance: Jake Guentzel made a timely pass to teammate Bryan Rust, who scored to put the visitors on the board. This proved to be the only goal of the period, as the Penguins went into the second intermission up 1–0. Then, in the third period, Patric Hörnqvist wristed a shot over Holtby's shoulder to add insurance to Pittsburgh's lead. The Penguins did not relinquish their 2–0 lead, as they shut out their arch-rivals in Washington to advance to the Eastern Conference finals for the second consecutive year. Fleury made 29 saves for Pittsburgh in the deciding win. The Penguins went on to defeat Ottawa in the conference finals and followed that series victory with a defeat of the Nashville Predators in the 2017 Stanley Cup Final in six games.

==== 2017–18 ====
The Capitals held home ice advantage again in the 2018 match-up, clinching the Metropolitan Division title with 105 points and ousting the Blue Jackets in the first round in six games after losing the first two games at home. The Penguins finished second in the division with 100 points and defeated the Flyers in six games as well. This would be the third consecutive second round match-up between the two teams.

Both teams were missing key players for the start of the series due to injuries sustained in their respective first-round series. The Penguins were without Evgeni Malkin for the first two games and Carl Hagelin for the first three, while the Capitals did not have André Burakovsky for the entire series. The scoring in game one started quickly, as Evgeny Kuznetsov netted a breakaway opportunity on a pass from Alexander Ovechkin just 17 seconds into the game. Ovechkin himself then doubled the lead on another quick strike, only 28 seconds into the third period. The Penguins responded with three goals in a five-minute span, with Patric Hörnqvist and Jake Guentzel scoring off deflections and Sidney Crosby potting the game-tying goal. The comeback resulted in a 3–2 victory for Pittsburgh.

The Capitals came back to tie the series after a convincing second game victory, with the help of a 32-save effort from Braden Holtby. The scoring began quickly again, as Ovechkin recorded the first tally just over a minute into the game. Lars Eller assisted on each of the next two goals, as rookie Jakub Vrána scored his first career playoff goal on the power play and Brett Connolly sniped a breakaway chance two minutes into the second period. The Penguins appeared to have fought their way back to a 3–2 deficit, but a potential tap-in goal from Patric Hörnqvist was disallowed following video review. The Capitals took the 4–1 victory and a tied series to Pittsburgh. Game three was an exciting back-and-forth affair, with three lead changes. Following a scoreless first period, John Carlson fired a slap shot past Matt Murray less than a minute into the second period: the third time the Capitals had scored in the first minute of a period in the series. Guentzel and Hörnqvist replied for the Penguins, with Malkin assisting the latter power play goal in his first game back. The two teams continued alternating scoring, with goals from Chandler Stephenson, Crosby, and Matt Niskanen. With the game tied 3–3 and a little over a minute left in regulation, Washington took the lead off an odd man chance. Ovechkin initially hit the post off a cross-ice pass from Nicklas Bäckström, but was able to bat the mid-air puck past Murray and into the net, giving Washington a 2–1 series lead.

Capitals top line winger Tom Wilson was involved in separate controversial plays in games two and thee. In game two, Wilson made contact with the head of Brian Dumoulin, sandwiching the defenseman between himself and Alex Ovechkin. Dumoulin exited the game, but would return for game three. The next game, Wilson delivered a hard hit to the shoulder of Zach Aston-Reese, giving the rookie center a concussion and broken jaw. Wilson would receive a three-game suspension from the NHL Department of Player Safety, and Aston-Reese missed the remainder of the series from the sustained injuries.

The Capitals headed back to Pittsburgh for game six up 3–2 in the series. The first period remained scoreless, and the game would remain that way until Alex Chiasson scored 2:13 into the second period for Washington. Chiasson's goal was assisted by Nathan Walker, the first Australian to record a point in a Stanley Cup playoff game. The Capitals' lead lasted until Kris Letang's shot from the blueline redirected off of Washington winger Chandler Stephenson to tie the game at one goal apiece, and the score stayed tied at the end of regulation. During overtime, Kuznetsov poke-checked the puck from Crosby in a turnover, and the puck went to Ovechkin, who found Kuznetsov streaking in toward the Penguins' net and passed the puck to him. Kuznetsov cashed in, winning the game 2–1 for the Capitals to upset the Penguins in a playoff series for only the second time in history, and the first time since 1994. It was their first series victory in the second round since their 1998 series win against Ottawa; since then, no other D.C.-based team had advanced to a league semifinal round. The Capitals went on to defeat the Lightning in game seven of the conference finals on Tampa Bay's home ice, and then took down the expansion Vegas Golden Knights in the Final to win their first ever Stanley Cup after 45 years.

=== 2018–present ===
After the Capitals' second playoff series victory over the Penguins and eventual first Stanley Cup victory in the 2018 playoffs, both teams no longer became Cup contenders, as for the next four seasons, both teams failed to reach the conference semifinals, and by the end of the 2022–23 regular season, nearly five years after Washington hoisted the Cup, they both missed the playoffs for the first time since the end of the 2005–06 season. Near the end of the 2023–24 season, ahead of the trade deadline, both teams traded away one key player each, Kuznetsov from the Capitals and Guentzel from the Penguins, to the Carolina Hurricanes, which benefitted from their combined arrival to cement their place in the upper levels of the Metropolitan Division. The season also saw both teams score a total of 11 goals against each other in a 2–2 regular season series tie, with the road team winning all four games by striking first and taking an insurmountable lead.

== See also ==
- List of NHL rivalries
- Ravens–Steelers rivalry
- Heated Rivalry, a TV series based on books by Rachel Reid initially inspired by the Crosby–Ovechkin rivalry
