= Dave Steckel =

American ice hockey player (born 1982)

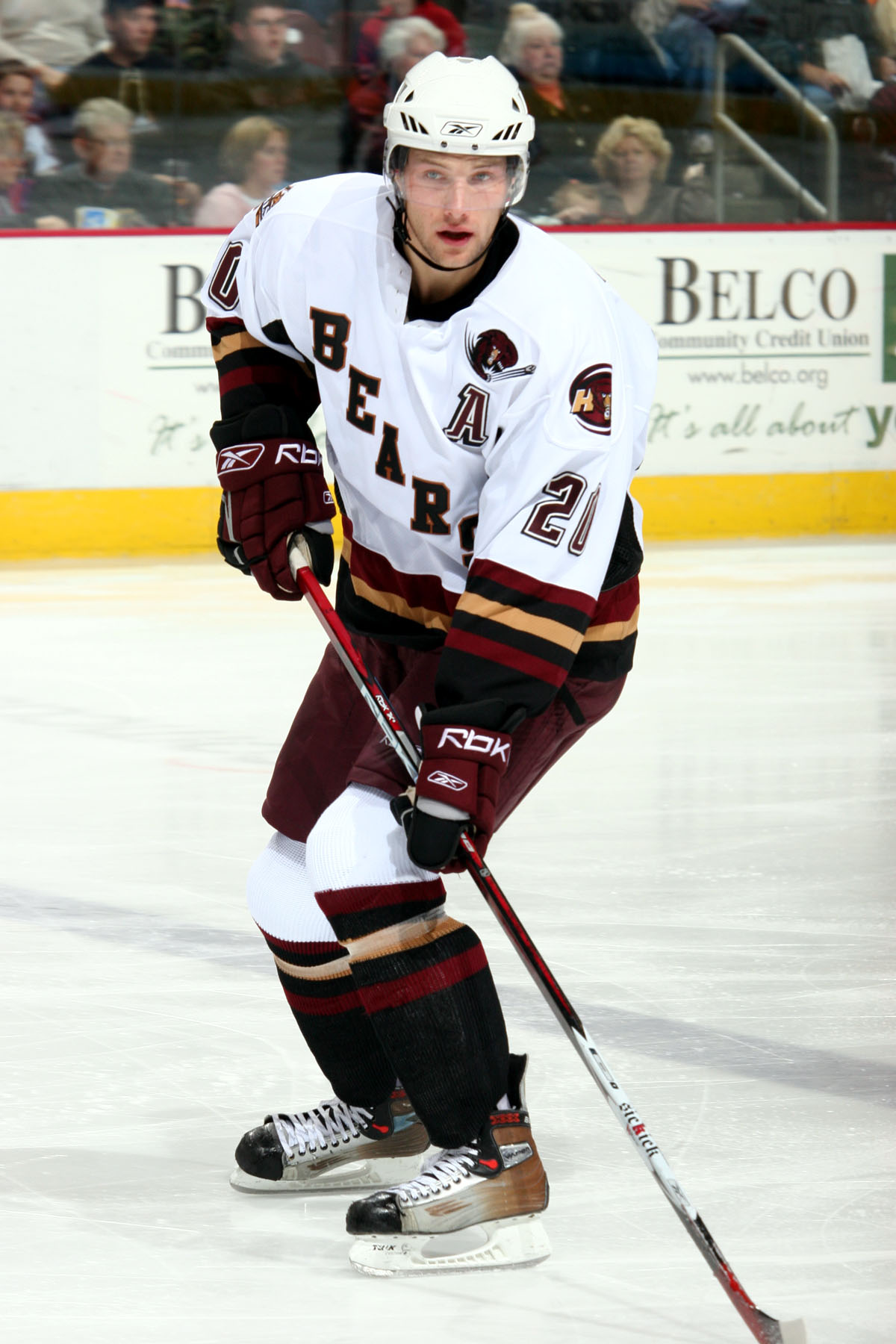
- Steckel with the Hershey Bears during the 2006-07 season
- Born: March 15, 1982 (age 44) West Bend, Wisconsin, U.S.
- Height: 6 ft 6 in (198 cm)
- Weight: 215 lb (98 kg; 15 st 5 lb)
- Position: Center
- Shot: Left
- Played for: Washington Capitals; New Jersey Devils; Toronto Maple Leafs; Anaheim Ducks; Thomas Sabo Ice Tigers
- National team: United States
- NHL draft: 30th overall, 2001; Los Angeles Kings
- Playing career: 2004–2018

David Steckel (born March 15, 1982) is an American former professional ice hockey center. He played in the National Hockey League for the Washington Capitals, the New Jersey Devils, Toronto Maple Leafs and Anaheim Ducks, before finishing his hockey career with the Thomas Sabo Ice Tigers of the Deutsche Eishockey Liga (DEL). He was known for his faceoff proficiency during his career.

== Playing career ==
Steckel was drafted by the Los Angeles Kings in the first round, 30th overall, in the 2001 NHL entry draft. Steckel played one full season with the US Junior National Team in the United States Hockey League before entering Ohio State University. He played four seasons with the Buckeyes hockey team, and then joined the American Hockey League's Manchester Monarchs for the 2004–05 season.

Steckel, a free agent, then signed with the Washington Capitals August 25, 2005, on the recommendation of Bruce Boudreau. He made his NHL debut with the Washington Capitals in the 2005–06 season, appearing in seven games. After appearing in five more games with the Capitals in 2006–07, he made the team's opening night roster in 2007–08.

Steckel proved himself to be a valuable commodity to the Capitals. He often centered the third line and was called on as a key member of the penalty kill. Steckel also proved himself very effective at face-offs, and typically was placed on the ice to take face-offs during critical moments of games. Near the end of the season, Steckel broke his finger blocking a shot and had to have pins put in. However, he missed very few games and was back on the ice during the playoffs.

Steckel's size and grit served the Capitals well, and it was expected that he would have an expanded role in the 2008–09 season. In the 2008–09 season Steckel was once again one of the Capitals top face-off men and one of their top penalty killers. He was 2nd on the team in shorthanded time-on-ice per game (first among forwards) with 3:48. On face-offs, he finished the season 5th in the NHL, winning 57.9% of his draws. He scored 8 goals and had 11 assists during the regular season. In the 2nd round of the 2009 playoff series against the Pittsburgh Penguins he scored his first-ever playoff game-winning goal in overtime of Game 6 to force a Game 7.

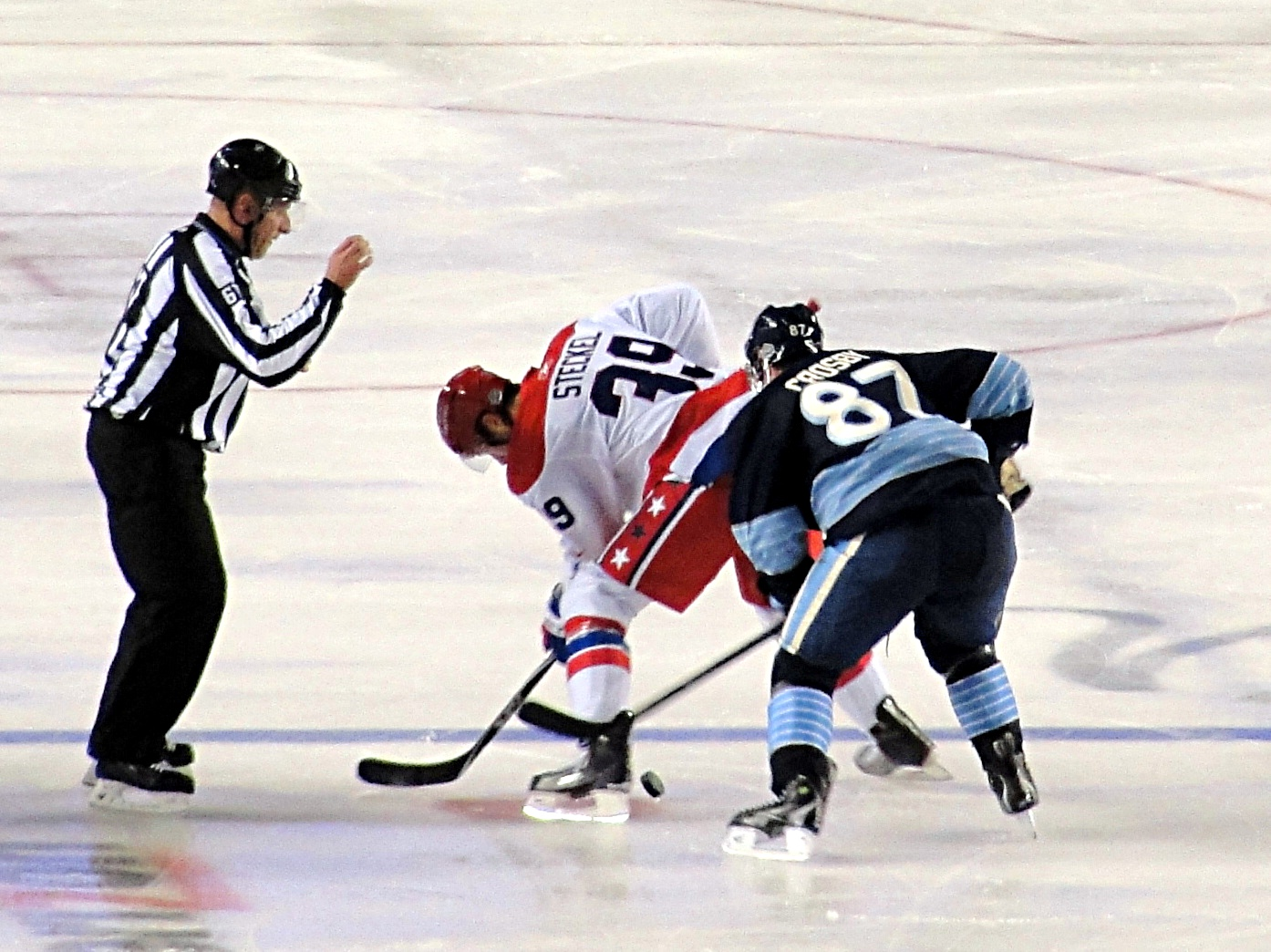
Steckel and Crosby face off in the 2011 NHL Winter Classic.

During the 2011 NHL Winter Classic on January 1, 2011, Steckel collided with Pittsburgh's Sidney Crosby on a blindside hit while skating out of his own zone to rejoin the play. Crosby experienced mild concussion symptoms and neck pain but remained in the game. A subsequent hit from Tampa Bay's Victor Hedman left Crosby with severe concussion symptoms and he did not return for the rest of the regular season, the 2010–11 Stanley Cup Playoffs, or the first twenty games of the 2011–12 NHL season. Hedman later said that he believed it was the collision with Steckel which had caused Crosby's severe concussion, and many observers concurred.

On February 28, 2011, Steckel along with Washington's 2012 2nd round pick was traded from the Capitals to the New Jersey Devils in exchange for Jason Arnott.

On October 4, 2011, Steckel was acquired by the Toronto Maple Leafs in exchange for a fourth round pick in 2012. In his only full season with the Maple Leafs, he contributed to the Leafs fourth line to match his career-high 8 goals for 13 points in 76 games.

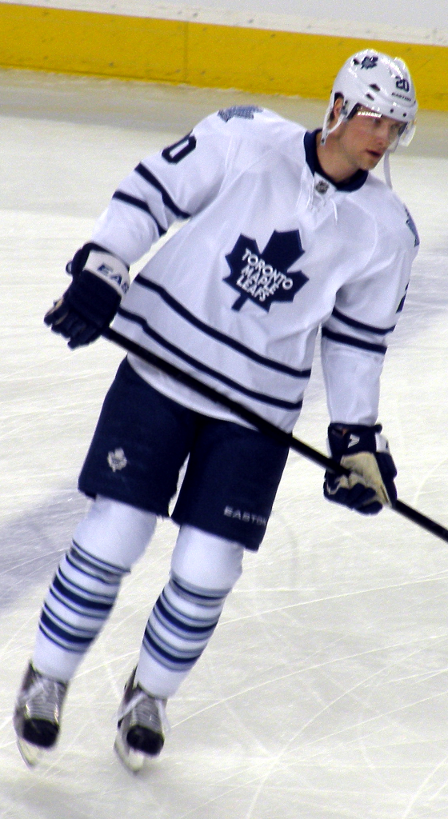
Steckel with the Leafs in 2012

During the 2012–13 season, Steckel was demoted to a reserve role. He sparingly appeared in 13 games before being traded on March 15, 2013, to the Anaheim Ducks in exchange for Ryan Lasch and a seventh-round pick in the 2014 draft. The trade reunited Steckel with former coach Bruce Boudreau. Steckel was re-signed by the Ducks for one more year on November 11, 2013. On December 12, 2013, the Ducks assigned Steckel to the Norfolk Admirals of the AHL.

On July 28, 2015, as a free agent, Steckel opted to sign his first contract abroad, agreeing to a one-year deal with German club, Thomas Sabo Ice Tigers of the DEL.

== Career statistics ==
=== Regular season and playoffs ===
			Regular season					Playoffs
Season	Team	League	GP	G	A	Pts	PIM	GP	G	A	Pts	PIM
1998–99	US NTDP U18	NAHL	51	3	14	17	18	—	—	—	—	—
1998–99	US NTDP Juniors	USHL	2	0	0	0	2	—	—	—	—	—
1999–2000	US NTDP Juniors	USHL	52	13	13	26	94	—	—	—	—	—
2000–01	Ohio State University	CCHA	33	17	18	35	80	—	—	—	—	—
2001–02	Ohio State University	CCHA	36	6	16	22	75	—	—	—	—	—
2002–03	Ohio State University	CCHA	36	10	8	18	50	—	—	—	—	—
2003–04	Ohio State University	CCHA	41	17	13	30	44	—	—	—	—	—
2004–05	Reading Royals	ECHL	9	3	6	9	2	—	—	—	—	—
2004–05	Manchester Monarchs	AHL	63	10	7	17	26	6	1	1	2	4
2005–06	Hershey Bears	AHL	74	14	20	34	58	21	10	5	15	20
2005–06	Washington Capitals	NHL	7	0	0	0	0	—	—	—	—	—
2006–07	Hershey Bears	AHL	71	30	31	61	46	19	6	9	15	16
2006–07	Washington Capitals	NHL	5	0	0	0	2	—	—	—	—	—
2007–08	Washington Capitals	NHL	67	5	7	12	34	7	1	1	2	4
2008–09	Washington Capitals	NHL	76	8	11	19	34	14	3	2	5	4
2009–10	Washington Capitals	NHL	79	5	11	16	19	3	0	0	0	0
2010–11	Washington Capitals	NHL	57	5	6	11	24	—	—	—	—	—
2010–11	New Jersey Devils	NHL	18	1	0	1	2	—	—	—	—	—
2011–12	Toronto Maple Leafs	NHL	76	8	5	13	10	—	—	—	—	—
2012–13	Toronto Maple Leafs	NHL	13	0	1	1	0	—	—	—	—	—
2012–13	Anaheim Ducks	NHL	21	1	5	6	4	7	1	1	2	0
2013–14	Iowa Wild	AHL	4	1	1	2	4	—	—	—	—	—
2013–14	Norfolk Admirals	AHL	61	9	16	25	38	10	1	3	4	4
2013–14	Anaheim Ducks	NHL	6	0	0	0	0	—	—	—	—	—
2014–15	Norfolk Admirals	AHL	76	7	16	23	53	—	—	—	—	—
2015–16	Thomas Sabo Ice Tigers	DEL	52	19	11	30	82	12	3	2	5	24
2016–17	Thomas Sabo Ice Tigers	DEL	51	14	20	34	38	13	1	7	8	18
2017–18	Thomas Sabo Ice Tigers	DEL	43	10	17	27	20	12	1	6	7	37
2020–21	Columbus Adult League	C Level	23	18	29	47	6	—	—	—	—	—
2021–22	Columbus Adult League	C Level	16	15	13	28	2	—	—	—	—	—
NHL totals			425	33	46	79	129	31	5	4	9	8
AHL totals			349	71	91	162	225	56	18	18	36	44
DEL totals			146	43	48	91	140	37	5	15	20	79

=== International ===
Year	Team	Event	GP	G	A	Pts	PIM
2000	United States	WJC18	6	2	5	7	14
2001	United States	WJC	7	0	1	1	6
2002	United States	WJC	7	0	1	1	12
Junior totals			20	2	7	9	32

== Awards and honors ==
Award	Year
College
All-CCHA Rookie Team	2001
AHL
Calder Cup (Hershey Bears)	2006

Awards and achievements
Preceded by Jens Karlsson	Los Angeles Kings first-round draft pick 2001	Succeeded by Denis Grebeshkov
