= Brooks Orpik =

American ice hockey player (born 1980)

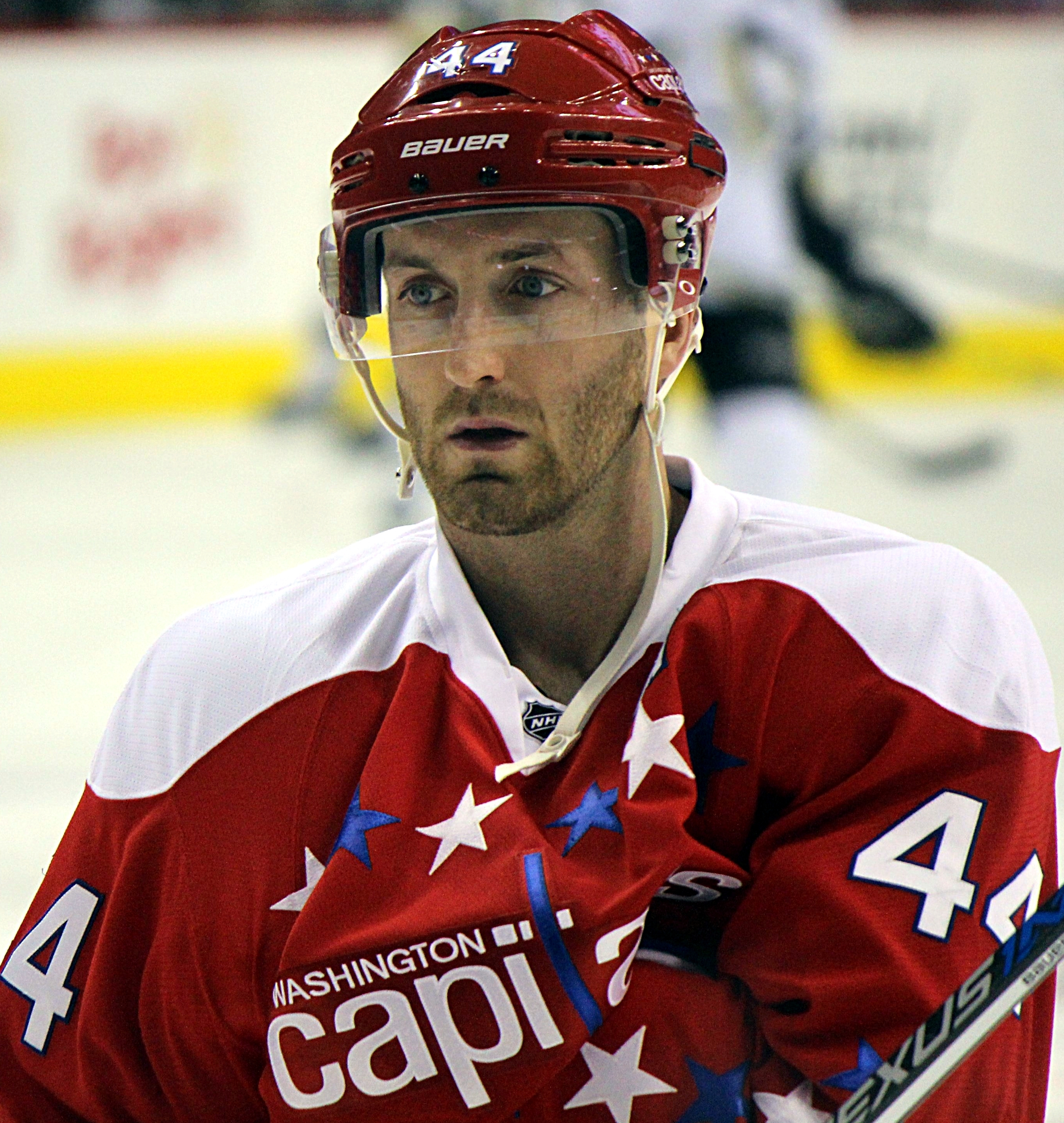
- Orpik with the Washington Capitals in April 2016
- Born: September 26, 1980 (age 46) San Francisco, California, U.S.
- Height: 6 ft 3 in (191 cm)
- Weight: 219 lb (99 kg; 15 st 9 lb)
- Position: Defense
- Shot: Left
- Played for: Pittsburgh Penguins; Washington Capitals
- National team: United States
- NHL draft: 18th overall, 2000; Pittsburgh Penguins
- Playing career: 2001–2019
- Coaching career

Biographical details
- Education: Boston College

Coaching career (HC unless noted)
- 2020–2022: Boston College (assistant)

Richard Brooks Orpik (born September 26, 1980) is an American former professional ice hockey player. A defenseman, he played for the Pittsburgh Penguins and the Washington Capitals of the National Hockey League (NHL). A stay-at-home defenseman and locker room leader, Orpik is a two-time Stanley Cup champion, winning with the Penguins in 2009 and with the Capitals in 2018 (the only player to win with both teams).

He served as an assistant coach of the Boston College Eagles under Jerry York in the NCAA. Orpik is also a member in the player development department for the Washington Capitals, where his role is to work with defensive prospects playing for the Hershey Bears.

== Early life ==
Orpik was born in San Francisco, a few months after the U.S. "Miracle on Ice" win over the Soviet Union in Lake Placid, New York, in 1980. Due to this, he was named after American Olympic head coach Herb Brooks. Orpik (as well as his brother Andrew) grew up in Amherst, New York. Orpik attended the Nichols School in Buffalo and Thayer Academy in Braintree, Massachusetts.

== Playing career ==
=== College ===
Orpik played three seasons at Boston College for the Eagles ice hockey team, winning the Hockey East playoff championship in 1999 and 2001, as well as the NCAA Men's Ice Hockey Championship in 2001. His younger brother Andrew was also a hockey player, playing for Boston College and having a brief minor league career.

=== Professional ===
==== Pittsburgh Penguins (2001–2014) ====
Orpik was drafted in the first round, 18th overall, of the 2000 NHL entry draft by the Pittsburgh Penguins. He began his professional career with the Wilkes-Barre/Scranton Penguins of the American Hockey League (AHL) during the 2001–02 season. He made his NHL debut during the 2002–03 season, playing in six games and recording no points. After earning a permanent roster spot on the team the next year, Orpik played in 79 games, registering one goal, nine assists and 127 penalty minutes.

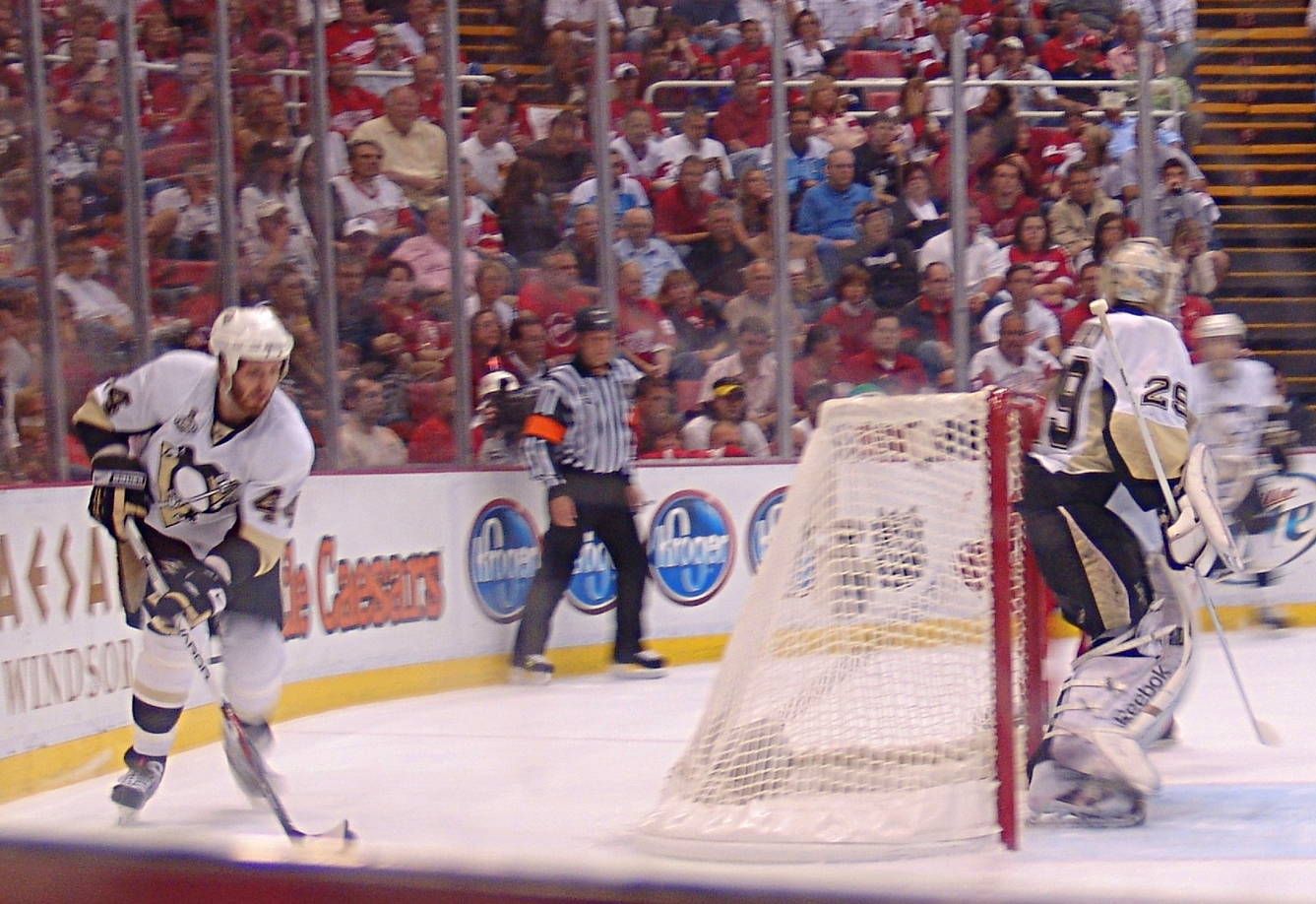
Orpik during the 2009 Stanley Cup Final.

On March 4, 2006, Orpik boarded Carolina Hurricanes forward Erik Cole, fracturing a vertebra in Cole's neck. Orpik was suspended three games for the illegal hit. Cole did not return until game six of the 2006 Stanley Cup Final.

In the summer of 2008, Orpik signed a new six-year, $22.5 million contract with the Penguins. In October 2008, he was named an alternate captain (interim while Sergei Gonchar was injured) of the Penguins, along with Evgeni Malkin, behind captain Sidney Crosby.

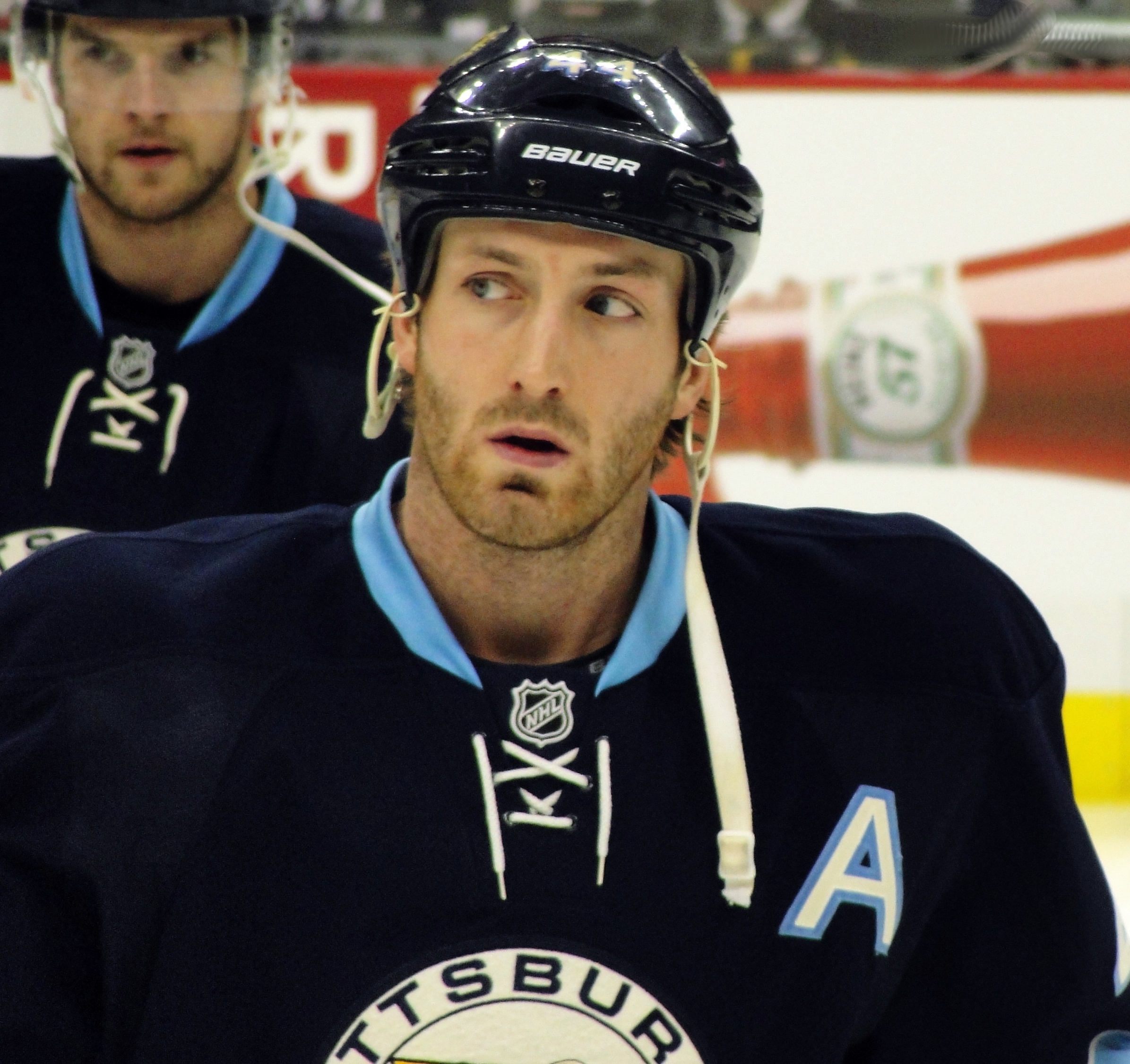
Orpik with the Penguins in January 2012.

On June 12, 2009, Orpik and the Penguins became Stanley Cup champions by defeating the Detroit Red Wings in game seven of the 2009 Stanley Cup Final. He was the first native of California to win the Stanley Cup.

On December 17, 2011, Orpik recorded his 100th career point by earning an assist on Evgeni Malkin's goal on Ryan Miller at Consol Energy Center in Pittsburgh.

On May 11, 2013, Orpik scored the game-winning goal in overtime of game six to eliminate the New York Islanders and advance Pittsburgh to the second round of the 2013 Stanley Cup playoffs; it was his first career Stanley Cup playoff goal.

On December 7, 2013, Orpik hit Boston Bruins forward Loui Eriksson, resulting in a concussion to the latter. While Orpik lay on the ice due to a confrontation with a Bruins player, Shawn Thornton delivered a punch that concussed Orpik; Thornton was suspended 15 games for the incident.

==== Washington Capitals (2014–2019) ====
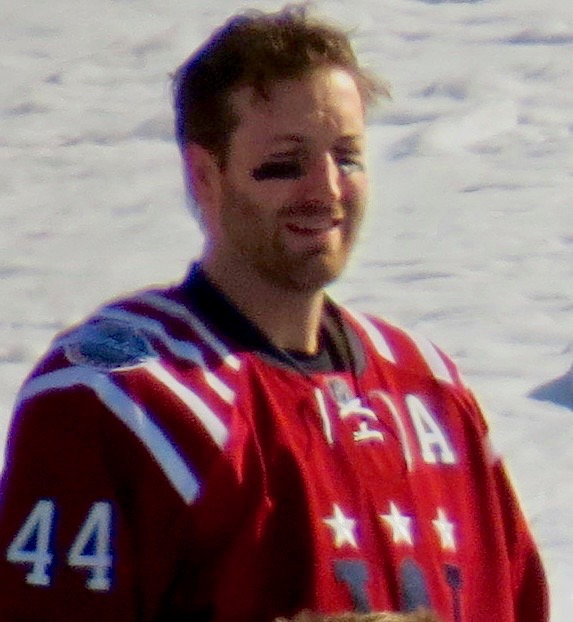
Orpik with the Washington Capitals in the 2015 NHL Winter Classic

On July 1, 2014, the Washington Capitals signed Orpik to a five-year, $27.5 million contract as an unrestricted free agent.

In game two of Washington's 2016 playoff series against the Pittsburgh Penguins, Orpik delivered an illegal and late hit to Pittsburgh defenseman Olli Määttä, making contact with Määttä's head. Orpik was suspended three games for the late hit and Määttä returned a few games later to finish, and help win, the series.

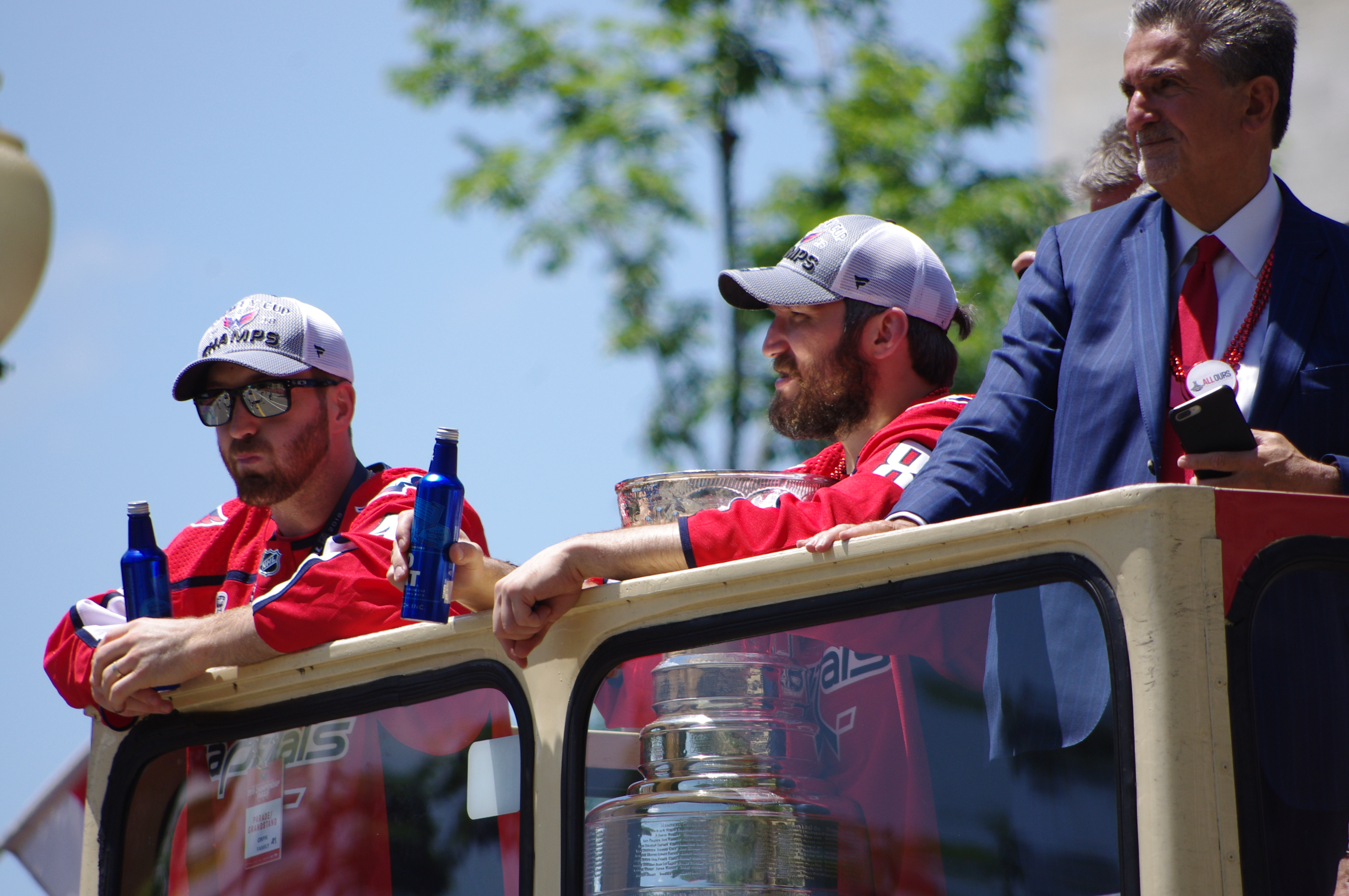
Orpik (left) with Alexander Ovechkin and Ted Leonsis in June 2018 during the Capitals 2018 Stanley Cup championship parade

On April 23, 2018, during his fourth season with the Capitals, in 2017–18, Orpik was Washington's nomination for the King Clancy Memorial Trophy as a player who best exemplifies leadership qualities and gives back to his community. In the 2018 playoffs, on May 30, 2018, Orpik scored the game-winning goal in game two of the 2018 Stanley Cup Final against the Vegas Golden Knights. It was also the first time Orpik had scored a goal since February 20, 2016. On June 7, 2018, Orpik and the Capitals went on to win the Stanley Cup against the Golden Knights in five games. This was the first Stanley Cup for the Capitals and the second finals victory for Orpik.

On June 22, 2018, less than three weeks after Orpik won the Stanley Cup for the second time, and due to salary cap considerations, Orpik was traded by the Capitals to the Colorado Avalanche (alongside goaltender Philipp Grubauer) in exchange for Colorado's second-round pick in the 2018 NHL entry draft. He was immediately informed by Avalanche general manager Joe Sakic that he would be moved to a preferred destination or bought out from the remaining year of the five-year contract he had initially signed with Washington. He was placed on unconditional waivers the following day and on June 24, he was released to free agency. On July 24, he signed a one-year, $1 million contract to return to Washington.

Orpik scored the overtime game-winning goal in game two of Washington's opening round 2019 playoff series against the Carolina Hurricanes, giving the Capitals a 2–0 series lead. This would be Orpik's last NHL goal. Despite this, the Capitals attempt at a Cup repeat would fall short as the Hurricanes went onto eliminate the Capitals in seven games.

On June 25, 2019, Orpik announced his retirement from professional hockey. Soon after retiring, the Capitals hired Orpik as a Player Development coach.

== International play ==
Medal record

Men's ice hockey

Representing the United States

Olympic Games
Silver medal – second place	2010 Vancouver	

In 1999, Orpik competed for the United States in the World Junior Ice Hockey Championships in Stockholm.

In 2009, Orpik was invited to the USA Hockey orientation camp, from August 17 to 19, in preparation for the 2010 Winter Olympics in Vancouver. Orpik was ultimately selected to the American team, which finished with a silver medal finish behind Canada.

== Personal life ==
He is married to Erin Orpik, with whom he has two daughters.

He was known as "Free Candy" to his teammates, a nickname bestowed upon him by a fan blog due to his infamously creepy appearance in a team portrait.

== Career statistics ==
=== Regular season and playoffs ===
			Regular season					Playoffs
Season	Team	League	GP	G	A	Pts	PIM	GP	G	A	Pts	PIM
1996–97	Thayer Academy	HS–Prep	20	4	1	5	—	—	—	—	—	—
1997–98	Thayer Academy	HS–Prep	22	0	7	7	—	—	—	—	—	—
1998–99	Boston College	HE	41	1	10	11	96	—	—	—	—	—
1999–00	Boston College	HE	38	1	9	10	104	—	—	—	—	—
2000–01	Boston College	HE	40	0	20	20	124	—	—	—	—	—
2001–02	Wilkes–Barre/Scranton Penguins	AHL	78	2	18	20	99	—	—	—	—	—
2002–03	Wilkes–Barre/Scranton Penguins	AHL	71	4	14	18	105	6	0	0	0	14
2002–03	Pittsburgh Penguins	NHL	6	0	0	0	2	—	—	—	—	—
2003–04	Pittsburgh Penguins	NHL	79	1	9	10	127	—	—	—	—	—
2003–04	Wilkes–Barre/Scranton Penguins	AHL	3	0	0	0	2	24	0	4	4	5
2005–06	Pittsburgh Penguins	NHL	64	2	7	9	124	—	—	—	—	—
2006–07	Pittsburgh Penguins	NHL	70	0	6	6	82	5	0	0	0	8
2007–08	Pittsburgh Penguins	NHL	78	1	10	11	57	20	0	2	2	18
2008–09	Pittsburgh Penguins	NHL	79	2	17	19	73	24	0	4	4	22
2009–10	Pittsburgh Penguins	NHL	73	2	23	25	64	13	0	2	2	12
2010–11	Pittsburgh Penguins	NHL	63	1	12	13	66	7	0	3	3	14
2011–12	Pittsburgh Penguins	NHL	73	2	16	18	61	6	0	0	0	4
2012–13	Pittsburgh Penguins	NHL	46	0	8	8	32	12	1	1	2	10
2013–14	Pittsburgh Penguins	NHL	72	2	11	13	46	5	1	1	2	0
2014–15	Washington Capitals	NHL	78	0	19	19	66	14	0	2	2	8
2015–16	Washington Capitals	NHL	41	3	7	10	24	6	0	0	0	10
2016–17	Washington Capitals	NHL	79	0	14	14	48	13	0	2	2	11
2017–18	Washington Capitals	NHL	81	0	10	10	68	24	1	4	5	15
2018–19	Washington Capitals	NHL	53	2	7	9	32	7	1	1	2	0
NHL totals			1,035	18	176	194	972	156	4	22	26	132

=== International ===
Year	Team	Event	GP	G	A	Pts	PIM
2000	United States	WJC	7	1	1	2	6
2006	United States	WC	7	0	0	0	10
2010	United States	OLY	6	0	0	0	0
2014	United States	OLY	6	0	0	0	2
Junior totals			7	1	1	2	6
Senior totals			19	0	0	0	12

== Awards and honors ==
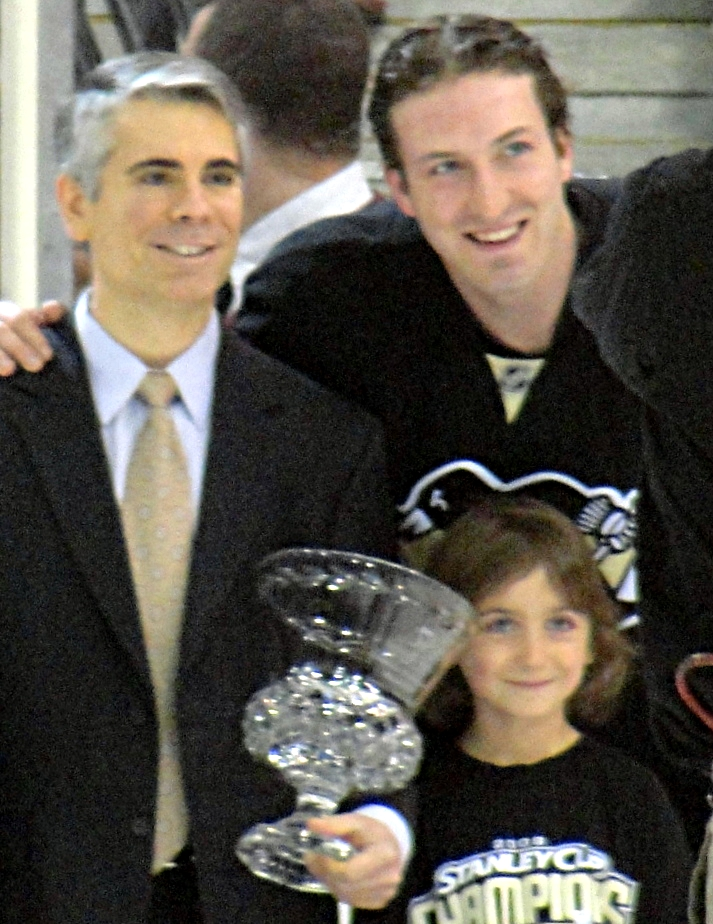
Orpik receives the Penguins Defensive Player of the Year Award for 2009–10.

Award	Year
NHL
Stanley Cup champion	2009, 2018
Pittsburgh Penguins
Defensive Player of the Year	2010

Awards and achievements
Preceded by Konstantin Koltsov	Pittsburgh Penguins first-round draft pick 2000	Succeeded by Colby Armstrong
