= John Erskine (ice hockey) =

Canadian ice hockey player (born 1980)

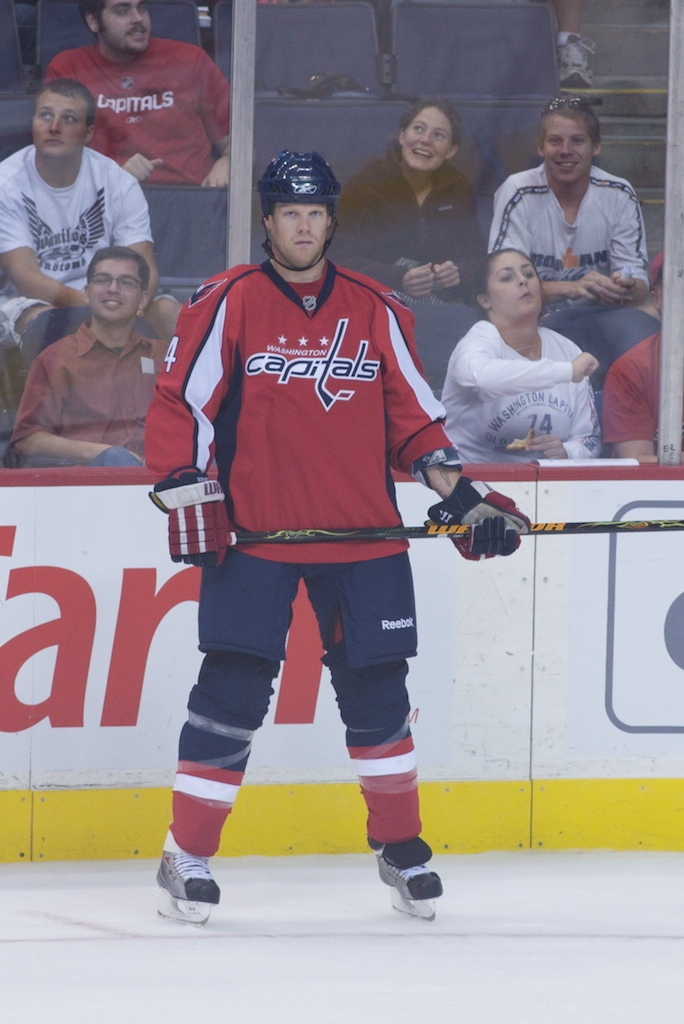
- Born: June 26, 1980 (age 46) Kingston, Ontario, Canada
- Height: 6 ft 4 in (193 cm)
- Weight: 220 lb (100 kg; 15 st 10 lb)
- Position: Defence
- Shot: Left
- Played for: Dallas Stars; New York Islanders; Washington Capitals
- NHL draft: 39th overall, 1998; Dallas Stars
- Playing career: 2000–2014

John Erskine (born June 26, 1980) is a Canadian former professional ice hockey defenceman. He played in the National Hockey League (NHL) with the Dallas Stars, New York Islanders and Washington Capitals.

== Early life ==
Erskine was born in Kingston, Ontario, but grew up playing minor hockey in his hometown of Ajax, Ontario for the Ajax Knights of the Ontario Minor Hockey Association's (OMHA) York-Simcoe League and the Ajax-Pickering Raiders AAA of the OMHA's Eastern AAA League.

== Career ==
After a solid 1995–96 season with the Ajax-Pickering Raiders Midget AAA team, Erskine signed for the following season with the Quinte Hawks Jr.A. team of the Ontario Hockey Association's Metro Junior League.

The London Knights selected Erskine with the 2nd overall pick in the 1997 OHL Priority Selection.

Erskine was drafted 39th overall in the 1998 NHL entry draft by the Dallas Stars. For the 1997–98, 1998–99, and 1999–2000 seasons, Erskine played for the London Knights of the Ontario Hockey League. Erskine won the Max Kaminsky Trophy as top defenceman in the OHL in 1999–2000. He showed marked improvement from season to season until his promotion to the Utah Grizzlies of the International Hockey League in 2000.

Erskine's NHL debut came during the 2001–02 NHL season with Dallas, where he played 33 games, notching a single assist. He remained in Dallas until midway through the 2005–06 NHL season when Dallas traded Erskine to the New York Islanders for Finnish defenceman Janne Niinimaa. At the conclusion of the season, the Islanders did not re-sign Erskine, leaving him a free agent.

On September 14, 2006, Erskine signed as a free agent with the Washington Capitals. Following the end of the season he extended his stay with the Capitals for a further two years. In the final year of his contract a neck injury kept him out of the lineup for the entire 2014–15 season, effectively ending his playing career.

== Career statistics ==
			Regular season					Playoffs
Season	Team	League	GP	G	A	Pts	PIM	GP	G	A	Pts	PIM
1995–96	Ajax/Pickering Raiders AAA	Midget	49	11	29	40	122	—	—	—	—	—
1995–96	Ajax Axemen	OPJHL	3	0	0	0	2	—	—	—	—	—
1996–97	Quinte Hawks	MetJHL	46	4	16	20	241	—	—	—	—	—
1997–98	London Knights	OHL	55	0	9	9	205	16	0	5	5	25
1998–99	London Knights	OHL	57	8	12	20	208	25	5	10	15	38
1999–2000	London Knights	OHL	58	12	31	43	177	—	—	—	—	—
2000–01	Utah Grizzlies	IHL	77	1	8	9	284	—	—	—	—	—
2001–02	Dallas Stars	NHL	33	0	1	1	62	—	—	—	—	—
2001–02	Utah Grizzlies	AHL	39	2	6	8	118	3	0	0	0	10
2002–03	Dallas Stars	NHL	16	2	0	2	29	—	—	—	—	—
2002–03	Utah Grizzlies	AHL	52	2	8	10	274	1	0	1	1	15
2003–04	Dallas Stars	NHL	32	0	1	1	84	—	—	—	—	—
2003–04	Utah Grizzlies	AHL	5	0	0	0	18	—	—	—	—	—
2004–05	Houston Aeros	AHL	61	3	7	10	238	5	0	1	1	20
2005–06	Dallas Stars	NHL	26	0	0	0	62	—	—	—	—	—
2005–06	Iowa Stars	AHL	3	0	0	0	6	—	—	—	—	—
2005–06	New York Islanders	NHL	34	1	0	1	99	—	—	—	—	—
2006–07	Washington Capitals	NHL	29	1	6	7	69	—	—	—	—	—
2006–07	Hershey Bears	AHL	4	0	2	2	9	—	—	—	—	—
2007–08	Washington Capitals	NHL	51	2	7	9	96	7	0	2	2	6
2008–09	Washington Capitals	NHL	52	0	4	4	63	12	0	1	1	16
2009–10	Washington Capitals	NHL	50	1	5	6	66	—	—	—	—	—
2010–11	Washington Capitals	NHL	73	4	7	11	94	9	1	1	2	6
2011–12	Washington Capitals	NHL	28	0	2	2	51	4	0	1	1	0
2012–13	Washington Capitals	NHL	30	3	3	6	34	7	0	1	1	4
2013–14	Washington Capitals	NHL	37	1	3	4	56	—	—	—	—	—
AHL totals			164	7	23	30	663	9	0	2	2	45
NHL totals			491	15	39	54	865	39	1	6	7	32

== Awards and honours ==
Awards	Year
OHL
CHL Top Prospects Game	1998
First All-Star Team	2000
Max Kaminsky Trophy	2000
CHL First All-Star Team	2000
