= Eric Godard =

Canadian ice hockey player

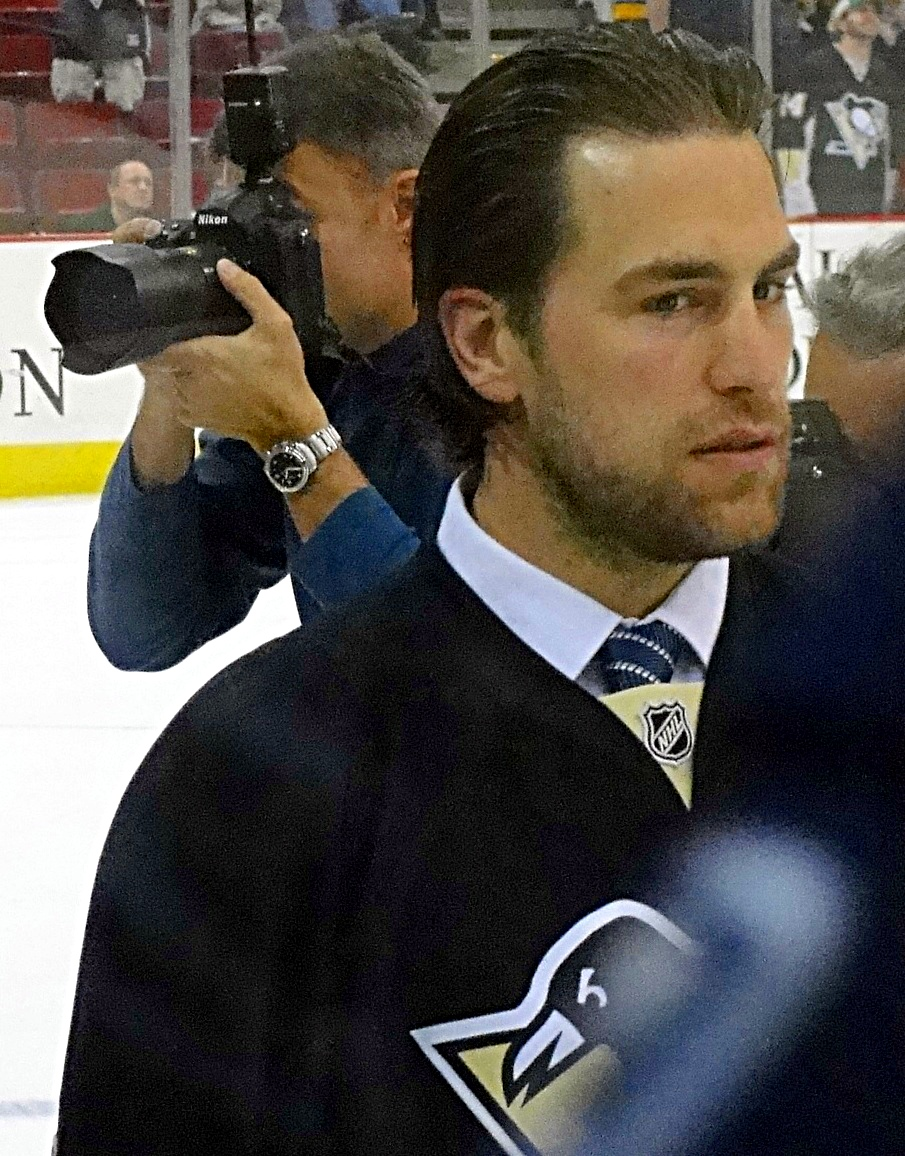
- Godard with the Penguins, April 2010
- Born: March 7, 1980 (age 46) Vernon, British Columbia, Canada
- Height: 6 ft 4 in (193 cm)
- Weight: 230 lb (104 kg; 16 st 6 lb)
- Position: Right wing
- Shot: Right
- Played for: New York Islanders; Calgary Flames; Pittsburgh Penguins
- NHL draft: Undrafted
- Playing career: 2000–2012

Eric Godard (born March 7, 1980) is a Canadian former professional ice hockey right winger who played in the National Hockey League (NHL) with the New York Islanders, Calgary Flames and the Pittsburgh Penguins. He was known as an enforcer for his physical style of play and regularly dropping the gloves. His nickname is "the Hand of God", a nickname derived from the play on his surname.

== Playing career ==
Godard played junior hockey with the Lethbridge Hurricanes of the Western Hockey League. He went undrafted and was signed as a free agent by the Florida Panthers on September 24, 1999. After being called up to the American Hockey League on April 1, 2000, by the Louisville Panthers, Godard was involved in his first professional fight taking on Todd Fedoruk of the Philadelphia Phantoms. Godard never played for the NHL Panthers though and on June 22, 2002, was traded to the New York Islanders for a third-round selection (previously acquired – Gregory Campbell).

Godard made his NHL debut with the Islanders on October 17, 2002, against the Philadelphia Flyers. In his next game on December 6, Godard recorded his first career fight against Tie Domi of the Toronto Maple Leafs. Godard played only occasionally for the rest of season, bouncing back and forth between the Bridgeport Sound Tigers of the AHL and the Islanders.

Godard played slightly more in the 2003–04 season for the Islanders, dressing in 31 games and recording 97 penalty minutes. During the NHL lockout in 2004–05, Godard rejoined the Sound Tigers in the AHL playing 75 games, scoring 18 points, and adding 295 penalty minutes.

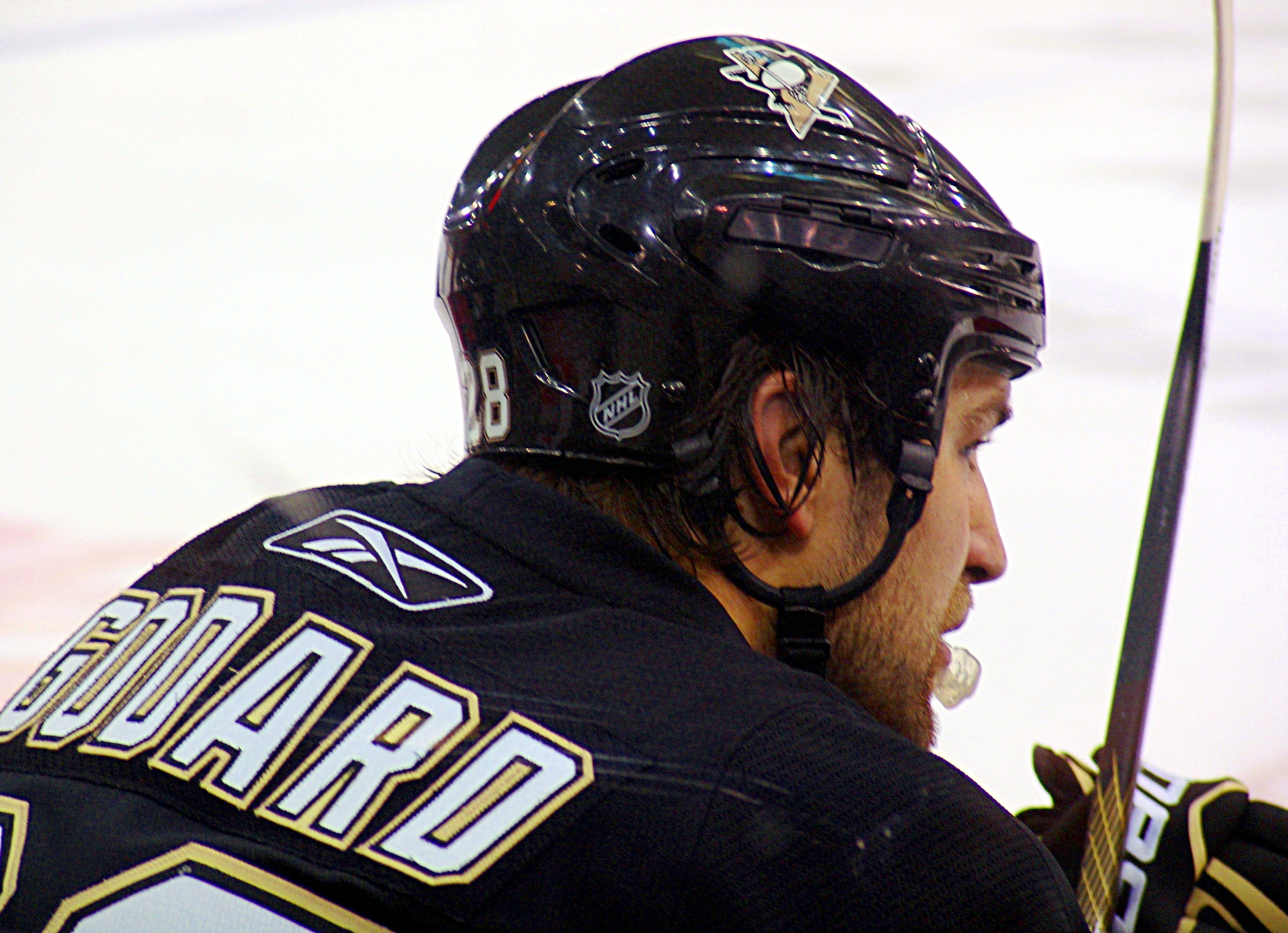
Godard with the Penguins in 2009.

In the 2005–06 NHL season Godard set career highs in games with 57 and also reached 100 penalty minutes for the first time (finishing with 115). Godard also scored his first career goal and finished the year with four points. On January 6, 2006, Godard was suspended for punching Carolina Hurricanes forward Justin Williams. In the offseason he signed with the Calgary Flames as a free agent on August 10, 2006.

After spending most of the season in the AHL with the Omaha Ak-Sar-Ben Knights, Godard was recalled by the Flames for the game against the Minnesota Wild due to the Wild's Derek Boogaard providing a physical presence in the previous teams' meeting. As anticipated, Godard and Boogaard dropped the gloves and Godard was able to stun and then drop Boogaard during the fight. The Flames went on to win the game 3–0 and Godard remained a regular in their roster for the remainder of the year.

Godard again set career highs in games (74) and penalty minutes (171) with Calgary in the 2007-08 NHL season and also played in his first playoff game, dressing in five in the Flames' first round series with the San Jose Sharks. The Flames choose not to re-sign Godard though and on July 1, 2008, he signed a three-year contract with the Pittsburgh Penguins.

In three seasons with the Penguins, Godard saw his playing time diminish from 71 games in 2008–09 to 45 games in the 2009–10 to 19 in 2010–11. Over those three seasons, Godard recorded 10 points and 352 penalty minutes while also winning the Stanley Cup with the Penguins in 2009.

On February 11, 2011, Godard was suspended for 10 games for leaving the bench and joining a fight in a game against the New York Islanders when Micheal Haley tried to fight Pittsburgh goalie Brent Johnson. On April 8, 2011, Godard was involved in his final NHL fight with Trevor Gillies of the New York Islanders. Godard was avenging Gillies' elbow to the head of teammate Eric Tangradi.

On July 12, 2011, he signed a two-year contract with the Dallas Stars and played the 2011–12 season with the AHL's Texas Stars. The first year of his contract was two-way and the second was one-way.

Godard did not play a game in the NHL in the 2011–12 season, assigned to the Stars AHL affiliate in Texas for the duration of the year. On March 2, 2012, Godard would drop the gloves for one final time in the AHL against Pierre-Luc Létourneau-Leblond of the Abbotsford Heat. Slated to earn $700,000 the following season regardless of where he played, the Stars bought out his contract in June 2012. With the 2012 NHL lockout affecting his contract status, Godard effectively announced his retirement on November 2, 2012.

== Career statistics ==
			Regular season					Playoffs
Season	Team	League	GP	G	A	Pts	PIM	GP	G	A	Pts	PIM
1997–98	Lethbridge Hurricanes	WHL	7	0	0	0	26	2	0	0	0	0
1998–99	Lethbridge Hurricanes	WHL	66	2	5	7	213	4	0	0	0	14
1999–00	Lethbridge Hurricanes	WHL	60	3	5	8	310	—	—	—	—	—
1999–00	Louisville Panthers	AHL	4	0	1	1	16	—	—	—	—	—
2000–01	Louisville Panthers	AHL	45	0	0	0	132	—	—	—	—	—
2001–02	Bridgeport Sound Tigers	AHL	67	1	4	5	198	20	0	4	4	30
2002–03	Bridgeport Sound Tigers	AHL	46	2	2	4	199	6	0	0	0	16
2002–03	New York Islanders	NHL	19	0	0	0	48	2	0	1	1	4
2003–04	New York Islanders	NHL	31	0	1	1	97	—	—	—	—	—
2003–04	Bridgeport Sound Tigers	AHL	7	0	0	0	13	—	—	—	—	—
2004–05	Bridgeport Sound Tigers	AHL	75	7	11	18	295	—	—	—	—	—
2005–06	New York Islanders	NHL	57	2	2	4	115	—	—	—	—	—
2006–07	Omaha Ak-Sar-Ben Knights	AHL	36	5	4	9	94	—	—	—	—	—
2006–07	Calgary Flames	NHL	19	0	1	1	50	—	—	—	—	—
2007–08	Calgary Flames	NHL	74	1	1	2	171	5	0	0	0	2
2008–09	Pittsburgh Penguins	NHL	71	2	2	4	171	—	—	—	—	—
2009–10	Pittsburgh Penguins	NHL	45	1	2	3	76	—	—	—	—	—
2010–11	Pittsburgh Penguins	NHL	19	0	3	3	105	—	—	—	—	—
2011–12	Texas Stars	AHL	46	1	0	1	58	—	—	—	—	—
AHL totals			326	16	12	28	1,003	26	0	4	4	46
NHL totals			335	6	12	18	833	7	0	1	1	6

== Awards and honors ==
Award	Year
NHL
Stanley Cup Champion (Pittsburgh Penguins)	2009
