= Pittsburgh Penguins–New York Islanders brawl =

Ice hockey incident (2011)

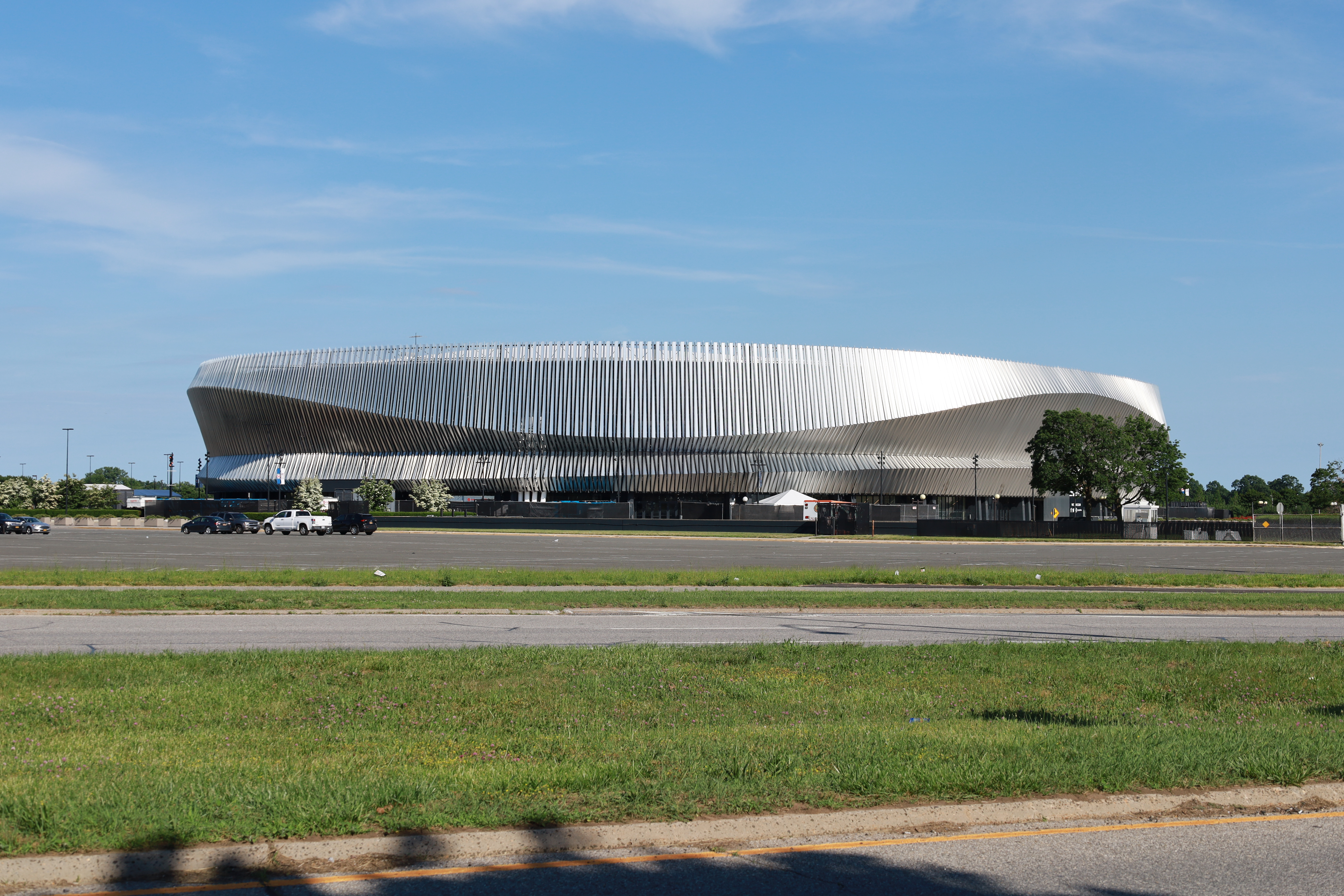
- The Nassau Veterans Memorial Coliseum, where the game took place.
	1	2	3	Total
Pittsburgh Penguins	0	2	1	3
New York Islanders	4	4	1	9
- Date: February 11, 2011
- Arena: Nassau Veterans Memorial Coliseum
- City: Uniondale, New York
- Attendance: 12,888

The Penguins–Islanders brawl was an incident during a National Hockey League (NHL) regular season ice hockey game between the Pittsburgh Penguins and the New York Islanders that resulted in a record for combined penalty minutes for both teams. The game was played on February 11, 2011, at Nassau Veterans Memorial Coliseum, the home arena of the Islanders at the time. New York won the game 9–3. In all, 65 penalties were assessed, including 15 fighting majors and 21 game misconducts, resulting in a total of 346 penalty minutes.

The high number of physical altercations was attributed to numerous on-ice incidents between the two teams throughout the season, most notably an incident during the prior meeting of the two teams in which Penguins forward Maxime Talbot delivered a hit to Blake Comeau that concussed him. Prior to the rematch, there were hints and indications from the Islanders that there would be retribution for the injury. The game itself featured two separate multi-player brawls, one of which occurred after Pittsburgh's Eric Tangradi took an elbow to the head, which caused a concussion. The NHL suspended three players for actions occurring in the game and fined the Islanders organization $100,000. After the disciplinary action was announced, Penguins owner Mario Lemieux questioned the direction of the League for allowing fighting.

== Previous game ==
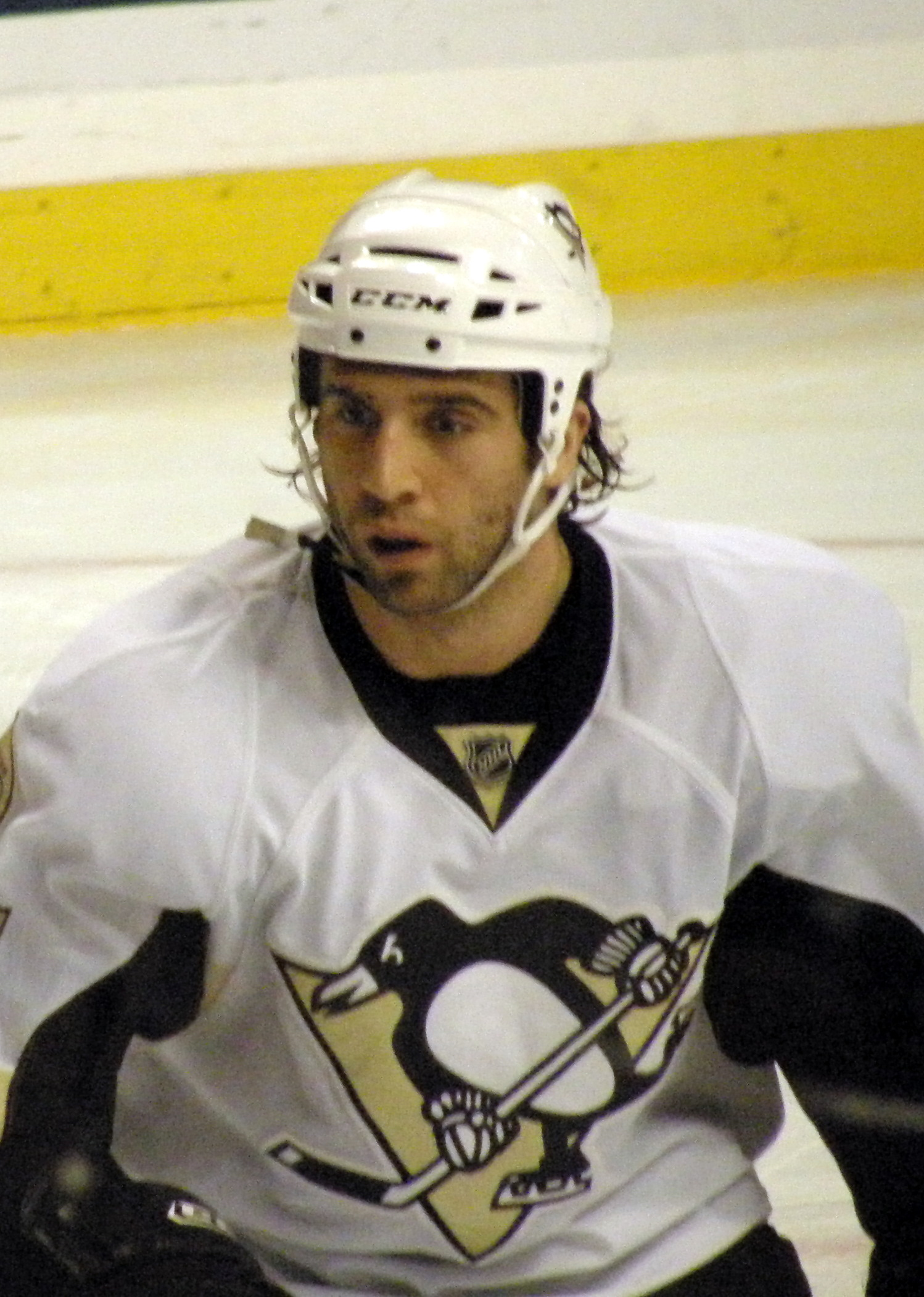
Maxime Talbot was at the center of the incident

The previous matchup, which took place nine days prior to the brawl, featured several incidents that contributed to the hostilities between the teams. In the first period of that contest, Penguins forward Maxime Talbot delivered a "questionable but unpenalized" body check to the Islanders' Blake Comeau. Talbot was not penalized and Comeau played for the remainder of the game, but was diagnosed with a concussion two days later. The injury caused Comeau to miss four games, including the rematch against the Penguins.

A second incident occurred later in the game. With just 16.5 seconds left in regulation, Islanders goaltender Rick DiPietro shoved Penguins forward Matt Cooke as he skated through the crease. As Cooke fell to the ground, a scrum ensued. Penguins goaltender Brent Johnson skated the length of the ice and engaged DiPietro in a fight. Johnson threw a single left hook, knocking the Islanders goaltender to the ice. DiPietro was sidelined for six weeks following the fight due to facial fractures and knee swelling.

== Brawl game ==
The Islanders were upset over what had transpired in the previous game and hinted that there would be retribution when the clubs next met on February 11, 2011. Following the February 2 game, Islanders forward Zenon Konopka said "We're not happy, and we're not happy with the outcome of the game. We have to remember this." The game began as a penalty-filled affair as eight penalties were called in the first period. The Islanders started the physical play early in the game, as Micheal Haley was assessed a roughing penalty at the 2:37 mark in the first period. Halfway through the first period, the first fight of the game occurred when Haley fought with Craig Adams. A second fight broke out late in the period when the Islanders' Trevor Gillies squared off with Penguins' enforcer Eric Godard with just over two minutes left in the period. At the end of the first, New York had scored four goals on Johnson and led 4–0.

Early in the second period, New York scored two goals just 30 seconds apart, taking a 6–0 lead. After the sixth goal, Johnson was pulled and as he skated to the tunnel where the back-up goaltender sits, he was showered with boos from the crowd, largely due to the ramifications of his prior fight with DiPietro. Shortly after Johnson was pulled, the first brawl occurred. Due to his previous hit on Comeau, Talbot was targeted by the Islanders' players, and he was 'jumped' from behind by Matt Martin. Martin's attempt to engage Talbot in a fight resulted in three separate fights breaking out. In his first NHL fight, the Islanders' Josh Bailey squared off with Pascal Dupuis, while the Penguins' Mike Rupp tangled with Travis Hamonic, while Martin fought with Deryk Engelland. All six players were automatically ejected from the game after each received ten-minute game misconduct penalties. Martin received an additional ten-minute misconduct and a two-minute minor for instigating the altercation. Martin's minor was offset when Engelland was assessed a minor for roughing for his part of the altercation. Three more minors were called during the period, which ended with the Islanders leading the game 8–2.

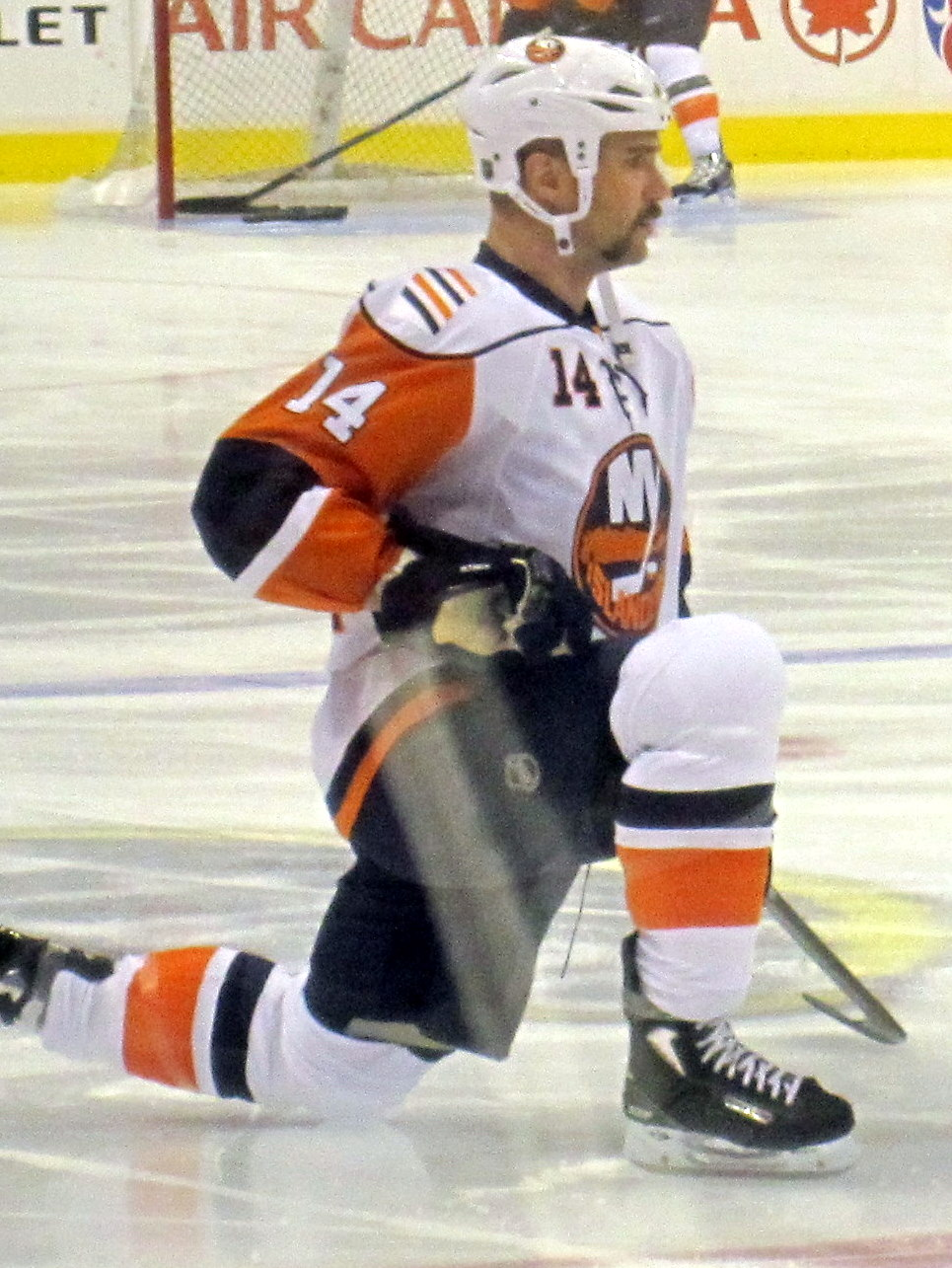
Trevor Gillies was given a nine-game suspension for his actions in the brawl

At the start of the third period, Johnson returned to the game after Marc-Andre Fleury had allowed 2 goals on 9 shots in the 16 minutes and 12 seconds that he had played. Less than five minutes into the third, a second brawl occurred. The melee started when Gillies elbowed Penguins forward Eric Tangradi in the head. After the elbow, Tangradi fell to the ice, where he was continually punched. When Gillies was separated from Tangradi, he was given a five-minute major for elbowing, a double minor for roughing, a ten-minute misconduct and a game misconduct. Despite being ejected from the game, Gillies continued to taunt the injured Tangradi from the runway to the dressing rooms. Tangradi left the game with an apparent concussion. While that situation was unfolding, other incidents were occurring on the ice — Haley fought Talbot and, while that fight was being broken up, Johnson skated from his crease towards his blue line. Haley skated towards Johnson, then both players dropped their gloves and engaged in a fight. As Haley approached, Godard left the bench to join in the fight and protect Johnson. Godard was assessed a double minor for roughing and two game misconduct penalties; Haley received an instigator minor, two fighting majors, a ten-minute misconduct and a game misconduct (the game misconduct being automatic for a third fight in a game); while Johnson was given a major for fighting. Although he was ejected from the game, the crowd chanted Haley's name for the rest of the period whenever a scrum ensued, another of which occurred at the 16:04 mark in the period that witnessed another six misconduct penalties. As the game wound down, there was yet another fight when Joe Vitale battled the Islanders' Andrew MacDonald. The fight occurred with just 2:47 remaining in the game, but it would not be the last penalty handed out, as just 15 seconds later, Ryan Craig was given both a cross-checking minor and a ten-minute misconduct. Both teams scored a goal during the third period, making the final a 9–3 Islanders win. After all the ejections at the end of regulation, the Penguins had seven eligible players, while the Islanders had nine. Only 12 players from both teams combined did not receive any penalties: Marc-Andre Fleury (who was actually the backup goalie in the game as part of a scheduled day off), Alex Goligoski, Nick Johnson, Paul Martin and Jordan Staal of Pittsburgh; and Bruno Gervais, Michael Grabner, Milan Jurcina, Mikko Koskinen, Radek Martinek, Matt Moulson and P. A. Parenteau of New York. In all, 65 penalties were assessed, including 15 fighting major penalties and 21 game misconducts, for a total of 346 minutes. The penalty minute total set team records for both the Penguins and Islanders for combined penalty minutes. Notably, Penguins star Sidney Crosby was not involved in the game nor the brawl, due to having suffered a season-ending concussion over one month prior in the 2011 NHL Winter Classic.

== Aftermath ==
The day after the game, the NHL handed out suspensions and fines for the incidents. New York's Trevor Gillies received a nine-game suspension and Matt Martin was given four games for his actions, which NHL Senior Executive Vice President of Hockey Operations Colin Campbell described as "deliberate attempts to injure." The Islanders organization was also fined $100,000 for "failure to control their players." Pittsburgh's Eric Godard was given an automatic ten-game suspension for violating League rules prohibiting players from leaving the bench to join a fight. Although such actions should result in a suspension for the player's head coach, the NHL elected not to enforce this rule. Tangradi, a recent callup from the Wilkes-Barre/Scranton Penguins, suffered post-concussion symptoms, causing him to miss nearly six weeks of playing time, which had the additional effect of making Tangradi, at the time of his call-up the leading scorer in the American Hockey League (AHL), miss the AHL's clear day (as he could not be reassigned while injured), making Tangradi ineligible to play in the AHL that post-season.

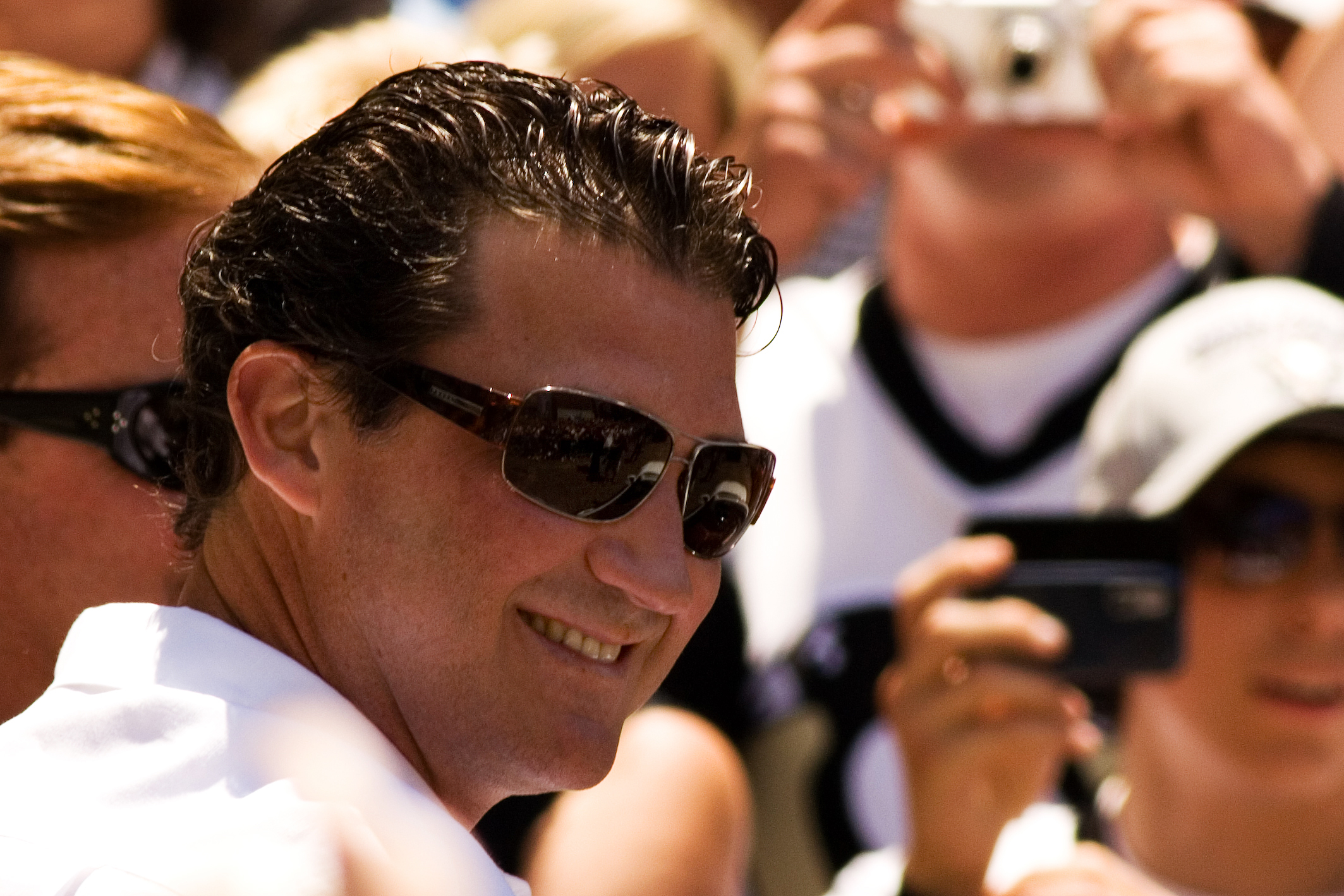
Mario Lemieux

Following the announcement of the suspensions, Penguins owner and Hockey Hall of Famer Mario Lemieux questioned the direction of the League. Lemieux released a statement on the issue, saying, "The NHL had a chance to send a clear and strong message that those kinds of actions are unacceptable and embarrassing to the sport. It failed." He further added, "If the events relating to Friday night reflect the state of the league, I need to re-think whether I want to be a part of it." An alternate view was expressed by Toronto Maple Leafs General Manager Brian Burke, who noted that he felt the NHL acted "swiftly, harshly and appropriately." Boston Bruins forward Milan Lucic agreed with Burke, stating that the NHL took a stand against line brawls and intent to injure opponents.

== Game summary ==
February 11, 2011	Pittsburgh Penguins	3–9	New York Islanders	Nassau Veterans Memorial Coliseum	Recap

Scoring summary
Period	Team	Goal	Assist(s)	Time	Score
1st	NYI	Travis Hamonic (2)	Michael Grabner (9) and Frans Nielsen (20)	08:51	1–0 NYI
1st	NYI	Jesse Joensuu (4)	Josh Bailey (10) and Matt Martin (5)	12:52	2–0 NYI
1st	NYI	P.A. Parenteau (14) – pp	Travis Hamonic (11) and John Tavares (23)	17:48	3–0 NYI
1st	NYI	Michael Grabner (20)	Bruno Gervais (5) and Radek Martinek (7)	19:12	4–0 NYI
2nd	NYI	John Tavares (20)	Travis Hamonic (12) and Matt Moulson (13)	03:16	5–0 NYI
2nd	NYI	Micheal Haley (1)	Jack Hillen (8)	03:46	6–0 NYI
2nd	PIT	Kris Letang (8) – pp	Alex Goligoski (20) and Brett Sterling (1)	06:08	6–1 NYI
2nd	PIT	Jordan Staal (5) – pp	Tyler Kennedy (16)	09:04	6–2 NYI
2nd	NYI	Matt Moulson (20)	P.A. Parenteau (21) and John Tavares (24)	13:31	7–2 NYI
2nd	NYI	Matt Moulson (21) – pp	John Tavares (25) and Milan Jurcina (8)	17:50	8–2 NYI
3rd	PIT	Tyler Kennedy (11) – pp	Kris Letang (35) and Joe Vitale (1)	09:04	8–3 NYI
3rd	NYI	Michael Grabner (21) – sh	Unassisted	17:51	9–3 NYI
Penalty summary
1st	NYI	Micheal Haley	Roughing	02:37	2:00
1st	NYI	Micheal Haley	Fighting – major	10:22	2:00
1st	PIT	Craig Adams	Fighting – major	10:22	5:00
1st	NYI	Travis Hamonic	Hooking	14:33	2:00
1st	PIT	Bench (served by Eric Tangradi)	Too many men on the ice	15:51	2:00
1st	PIT	Eric Godard	Fighting – major	17:56	5:00
1st	NYI	Trevor Gillies	Fighting – major	17:56	5:00
1st	NYI	John Tavares	Slashing	20:00	2:00
2nd	NYI	Josh Bailey	Fighting – major	05:21	5:00
2nd	NYI	Josh Bailey	Game misconduct	05:21	10:00
2nd	PIT	Pascal Dupuis	Fighting – major	05:21	5:00
2nd	PIT	Pascal Dupuis	Game misconduct	05:21	10:00
2nd	NYI	Travis Hamonic	Fighting – major	05:21	5:00
2nd	PIT	Mike Rupp	Fighting – major	05:21	5:00
2nd	PIT	Mike Rupp	Game misconduct	05:21	10:00
2nd	PIT	Deryk Engelland	Roughing	05:21	2:00
2nd	PIT	Deryk Engelland	Game misconduct	05:21	10:00
2nd	NYI	Travis Hamonic	Game misconduct	05:21	10:00
2nd	NYI	Matt Martin (served by Trevor Gillies)	Instigator	05:21	2:00
2nd	NYI	Matt Martin	Fighting – major	05:21	5:00
2nd	NYI	Matt Martin	Game misconduct	05:21	10:00
2nd	NYI	Matt Martin	Misconduct	05:21	10:00
2nd	NYI	Frans Nielsen	Slashing	07:51	2:00
2nd	PIT	Eric Godard	Fighting – major	17:20	2:00
2nd	PIT	Zbynek Michalek	Slashing	17:30	2:00
3rd	PIT	Brooks Orpik	Charging	01:19	2:00
3rd	NYI	Kyle Okposo	Roughing	01:19	2:00
3rd	PIT	Brent Johnson	Fighting – major	04:47	5:00
3rd	PIT	Eric Godard	Roughing – double minor	04:47	4:00
3rd	PIT	Eric Godard	Double game misconduct	04:47	20:00
3rd	PIT	Maxime Talbot	Fighting – major	04:47	5:00
3rd	PIT	Craig Adams	Roughing	04:47	2:00
3rd	PIT	Craig Adams	Game misconduct	04:47	2:00
3rd	NYI	Micheal Haley	Instigator	04:47	2:00
3rd	NYI	Micheal Haley	Fighting – double major	04:47	10:00
3rd	NYI	Micheal Haley	Game misconduct	04:47	10:00
3rd	NYI	Micheal Haley	Misconduct	04:47	10:00
3rd	NYI	Trevor Gillies	Roughing – double minor	04:47	4:00
3rd	NYI	Trevor Gillies (served by Jesse Joensuu)	Elbowing – major	04:47	5:00
3rd	NYI	Trevor Gillies	Game misconduct	04:47	10:00
3rd	NYI	Trevor Gillies	Misconduct	04:47	10:00
3rd	PIT	Brett Sterling	Roughing	12:12	2:00
3rd	NYI	Kyle Okposo	Goaltender interference	12:12	2:00
3rd	PIT	Tyler Kennedy	Holding	12:40	2:00
3rd	NYI	Zenon Konopka	Roughing	16:04	2:00
3rd	PIT	Maxime Talbot	Roughing	16:04	2:00
3rd	PIT	Maxime Talbot	Misconduct	16:04	10:00
3rd	NYI	Kyle Okposo	Roughing	16:04	2:00
3rd	NYI	Zenon Konopka	Misconduct	16:04	10:00
3rd	NYI	Bench (served by Jesse Joensuu)	Too many men on the ice	16:04	2:00
3rd	PIT	Kris Letang	Roughing	16:04	2:00
3rd	PIT	Kris Letang	Misconduct	16:04	10:00
3rd	NYI	Kyle Okposo	Misconduct	16:04	10:00
3rd	PIT	Brett Sterling	Misconduct	16:12	10:00
3rd	NYI	Jack Hillen	Misconduct	16:12	10:00
3rd	NYI	Andrew MacDonald	Cross-checking	17:43	2:00
3rd	PIT	Joe Vitale	Cross-checking	17:43	2:00
3rd	NYI	Andrew MacDonald	Fighting – major	17:43	5:00
3rd	PIT	Joe Vitale	Fighting – major	17:43	5:00
3rd	PIT	Ryan Craig (served by Alex Goligoski)	Cross-checking	17:58	2:00
3rd	PIT	Ryan Craig	Misconduct	17:58	10:00

Shots by period
Team	1	2	3	Total
Pittsburgh	10	17	11	38
New York	16	12	8	36

Power play opportunities
Team	Goals/Opportunities
Pittsburgh	3/9
New York	2/5

Three star selections
	Team	Player	Statistics
1st	NYI	John Tavares	1 goal, 3 assists
2nd	NYI	Matt Moulson	2 goals, 1 assist
3rd	NYI	Michael Grabner	2 goals, 1 assist

As noted before, there were 346 penalty minutes handed out in the game. Combined, there were twenty-eight minor penalties (56 minutes), sixteen major penalties (fifteen of them were for fighting), and twenty-one misconduct or game misconducts handed out.

Of these, the Islanders received fourteen minor penalties (28 minutes), nine major penalties (45 minutes—eight were fighting majors and another was an elbowing), and eleven misconduct or game misconducts (110 minutes) for a total of 183 penalty minutes.

The Penguins received fourteen minor penalties (28 minutes), seven major penalties (35 minutes), all but one of which were fighting majors, and ten misconduct or game misconducts (100 minutes), for a total of 163 penalty minutes.

=== Penalty summary ===
Below is a table showing players from both teams and the number of penalties and penalties in minutes they received.

Player	Team	Penalties	Minutes
Micheal Haley	NYI	7	39
Trevor Gillies	NYI	6	34
Eric Godard	PIT	6	31
Matt Martin	NYI	4	27
Craig Adams	PIT	3	17
Travis Hamonic	NYI	3	17
Maxime Talbot	PIT	3	17
Kyle Okposo	NYI	4	16
Josh Bailey	NYI	2	15
Pascal Dupuis	PIT	2	15
Michael Rupp	PIT	2	15
Ryan Craig	PIT	2	12
Deryk Engelland	PIT	2	12
Zenon Konopka	NYI	2	12
Kris Letang	PIT	2	12
Brett Sterling	PIT	2	12
Jack Hillen	NYI	1	10
Andrew MacDonald	NYI	2	7
Joe Vitale	PIT	2	7
Brent Johnson	PIT	1	5
Tyler Kennedy	PIT	1	2
Zbynek Michalek	PIT	1	2
Frans Nielsen	NYI	1	2
Brooks Orpik	PIT	1	2
John Tavares	NYI	1	2
Bench Minor	NYI	1	2
Bench Minor	PIT	1	2
