= Brent Johnson =

American ice hockey player (born 1977)

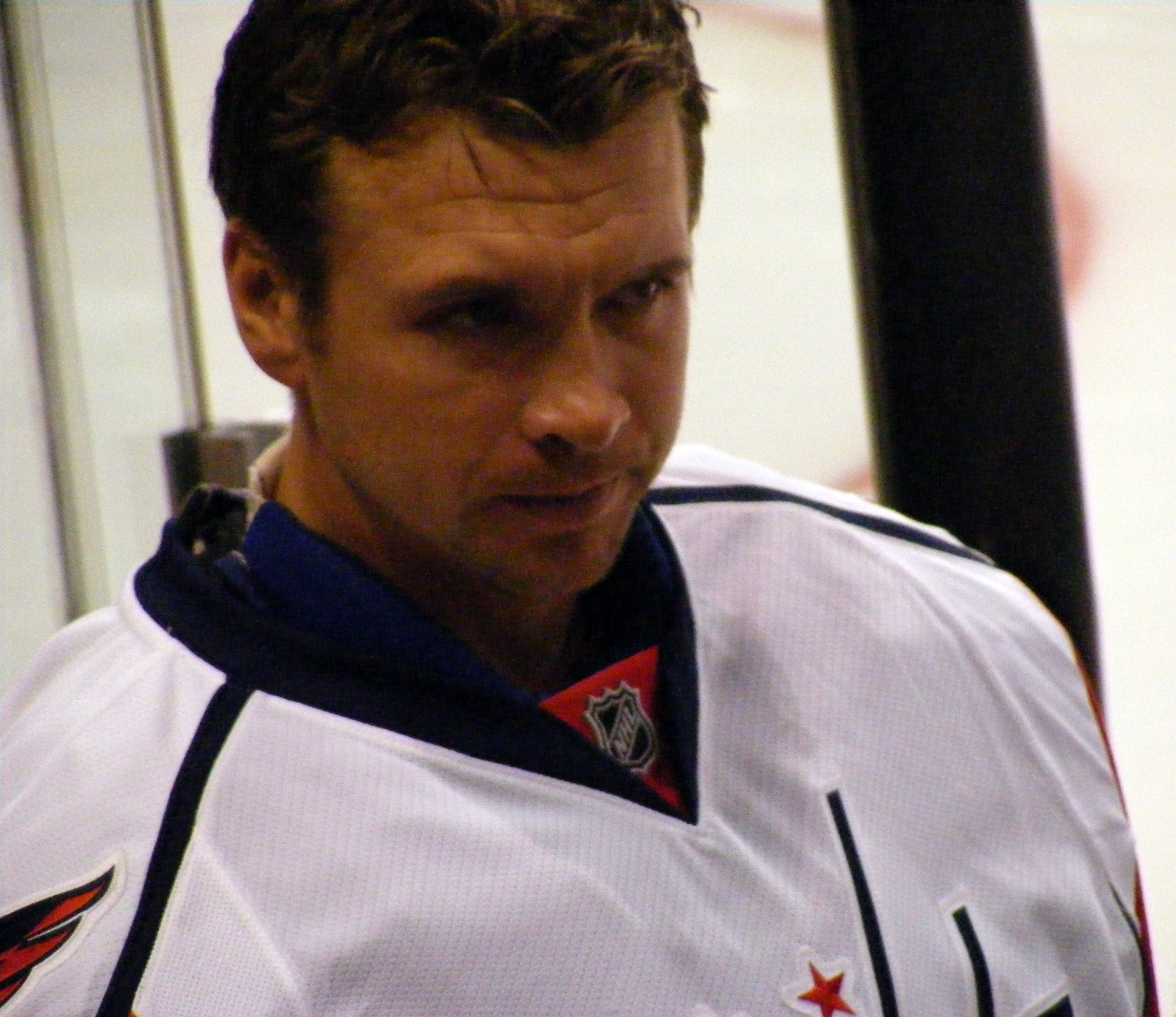
- Johnson with the Washington Capitals in 2008
- Born: March 12, 1977 (age 49) Farmington, Michigan, U.S.
- Height: 6 ft 3 in (191 cm)
- Weight: 199 lb (90 kg; 14 st 3 lb)
- Position: Goaltender
- Caught: Left
- Played for: St. Louis Blues; Phoenix Coyotes; Washington Capitals; Pittsburgh Penguins
- NHL draft: 129th overall, 1995; Colorado Avalanche
- Playing career: 1997–2012

Brent Spencer Johnson (born March 12, 1977) is an American former professional ice hockey goaltender. He played in the National Hockey League (NHL) for the St. Louis Blues, Phoenix Coyotes, Washington Capitals, and the Pittsburgh Penguins. He is currently a studio analyst for Monumental Sports Network.

== Playing career ==
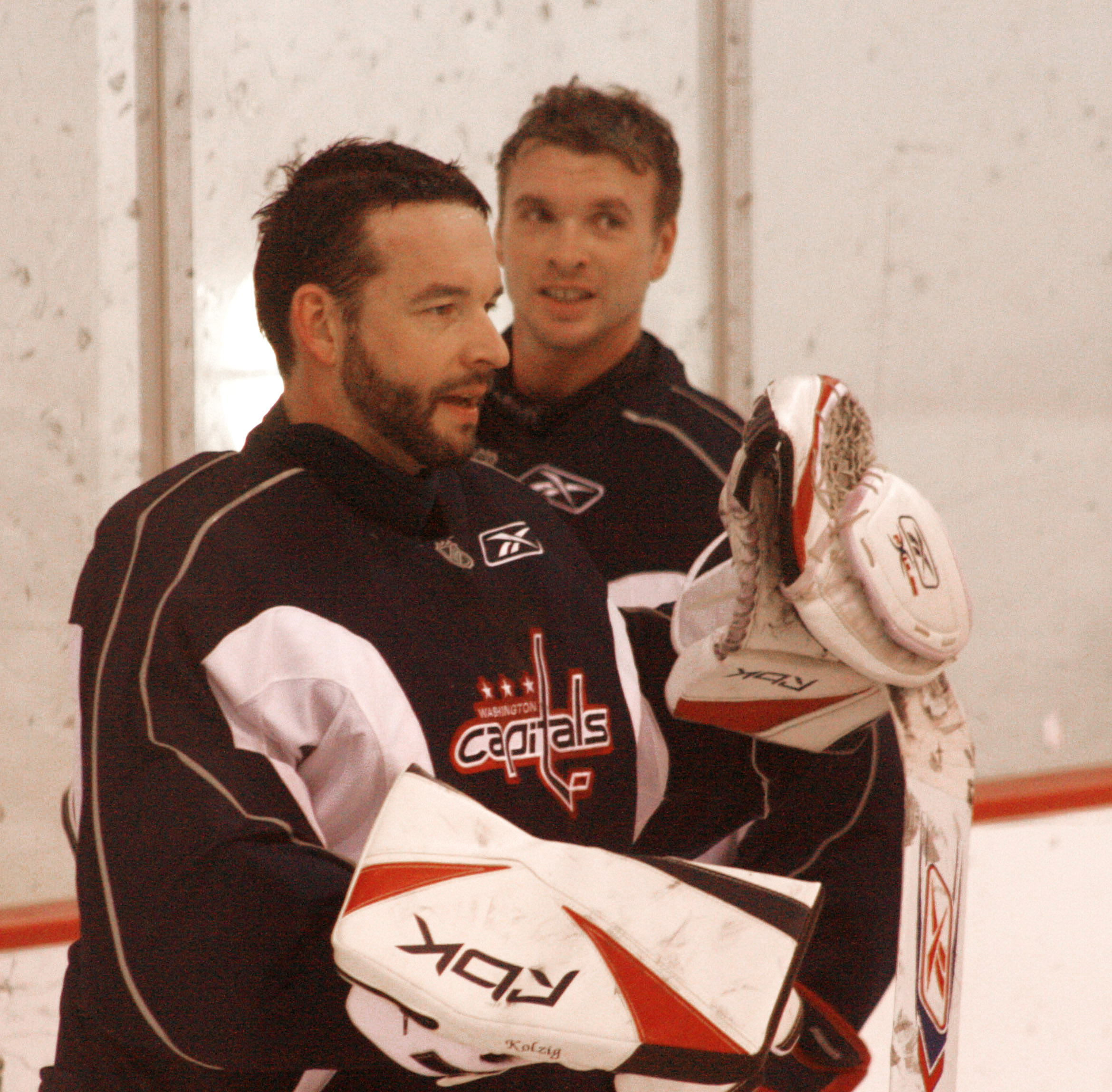
Olaf Kölzig and Brent Johnson in a 2007–08 Capitals practice session at the Kettler Ice Center in Arlington, Virginia.

As a youth, Johnson played in the 1991 Quebec International Pee-Wee Hockey Tournament with a minor ice hockey team from Fraser, Michigan.

Originally a fifth round 1995 draft pick of the Colorado Avalanche, Johnson started his NHL career with the St. Louis Blues in the 1998–1999 season. He played there until he was traded during the 2003–04 season to the Phoenix Coyotes. Johnson was signed by the Vancouver Canucks prior to the start of the 2005–06 season, but was soon claimed on waivers by the Capitals, where he played behind both Olaf Kölzig and José Théodore.

Johnson is the grandson of NHL Hall of Famer Sid Abel and the son of former NHL goaltender Bob Johnson. Brent Johnson was in goal for the Capitals on February 4, 2006, when they played against the Tampa Bay Lightning. The Lightning's goaltender for the game was John Grahame, the son of former NHL goaltender Ron Grahame. According to the Capitals, this game was the first occasion where two second-generation NHL goaltenders competed against each other.

For the week ending November 9, 2008, Johnson was named the NHL Third Star of the Week by helping the Capitals collect five points in three games (each consecutive starts). He went 2–0–1 with a 1.63 GAA and a .953 save percentage.

He underwent hip surgery in February 2009 and was expected to be out of action two months.

Johnson was deemed expendable by Washington after the emergence of young goalie Semyon Varlamov. On July 21, 2009, Johnson was signed as a free agent to a one-year contract by the Pittsburgh Penguins to back-up Marc-André Fleury. After helping the Penguins to 10 wins in 23 games for the 2009–10 season he was signed to a two-year extension with Pittsburgh, through to the 2011–12 season on April 13, 2010. On February 2, 2011, Johnson had his first fight in the NHL when he engaged with Rick DiPietro in a fight after DiPietro and Matt Cooke collided near the goal crease. Johnson skated over to DiPietro, ignoring the referee waving him off, and took DiPietro down with one punch. It was later found out that DiPietro suffered facial fractures from the punch. Johnson received leaving crease and game misconduct penalties. The next game against the Islanders (9 days later), Johnson once again in goal, fought with Islanders center Micheal Haley along with Penguins forward Eric Godard who left the bench to assist his goaltender.

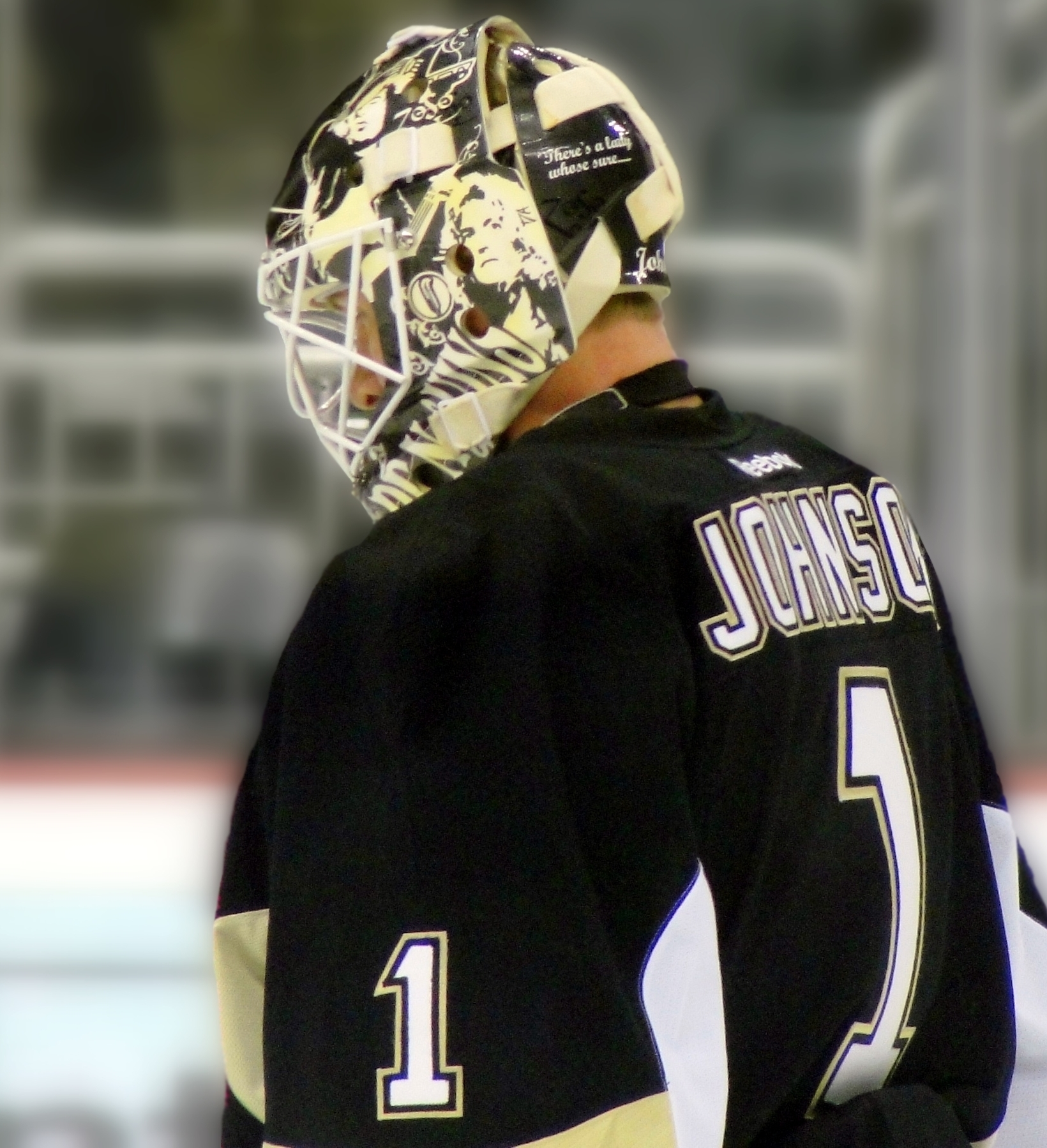
Brent Johnson, October 2011.

In the last year of his contract with the Penguins, during the 2011–12 season, Johnson struggled to repeat his impressive earlier form and suffered his worst season in Pittsburgh. With just six wins, he was subsequently not tendered a new contract by the Penguins and was released to free agency.

== Personal ==
He married Erica Danielle Ence of Burke, Virginia on August 11, 2007. The couple have two daughters.

Johnson is the grandson of NHL Hall of Famer Sid Abel and the son of former Penguins' goaltender Bob Johnson.

Johnson is also a fan of the English rock band Led Zeppelin, and often paid tribute to the band in the artwork on his goalie masks.

== Career statistics ==
=== Regular season and playoffs ===
			Regular season										Playoffs
Season	Team	League	GP	W	L	T	OTL	MIN	GA	SO	GAA	SV%	GP	W	L	MIN	GA	SO	GAA	SV%
1993–94	Detroit Compuware Ambassadors	NAHL	18	—	—	—	—	1024	49	1	3.52	—	—	—	—	—	—	—	—	—
1994–95	Owen Sound Platers	OHL	18	3	9	1	—	904	95	0	4.98	—	—	—	—	—	—	—	—	—
1995–96	Owen Sound Platers	OHL	58	24	28	1	—	3211	243	1	4.54	.884	6	2	4	371	29	0	4.69	—
1996–97	Owen Sound Platers	OHL	50	20	28	1	—	2798	201	1	4.31	.891	4	0	4	253	24	0	5.69	—
1997–98	Worcester IceCats	AHL	42	14	15	7	—	2240	119	0	3.19	.899	6	3	2	332	19	0	3.43	.885
1998–99	Worcester IceCats	AHL	49	22	22	4	—	2925	146	2	2.99	.896	4	1	3	238	12	0	3.03	.916
1998–99	St. Louis Blues	NHL	6	3	2	0	—	286	10	0	2.10	.921	—	—	—	—	—	—	—	—
1999–00	Worcester IceCats	AHL	58	24	27	5	—	3319	161	3	2.91	.911	9	4	5	561	23	1	2.46	.931
2000–01	St. Louis Blues	NHL	31	19	9	2	—	1744	63	4	2.17	.907	2	0	1	62	2	0	1.94	.944
2001–02	St. Louis Blues	NHL	58	34	20	4	—	3491	127	5	2.18	.902	10	5	5	590	18	3	1.83	.929
2002–03	Worcester IceCats	AHL	2	0	1	1	—	125	8	0	3.84	.880	—	—	—	—	—	—	—	—
2002–03	St. Louis Blues	NHL	38	16	13	5	—	2042	85	2	2.47	.900	—	—	—	—	—	—	—	—
2003–04	Worcester IceCats	AHL	8	2	2	2	—	365	14	0	2.30	.910	—	—	—	—	—	—	—	—
2003–04	St. Louis Blues	NHL	10	4	3	1	—	493	20	1	2.43	.901	—	—	—	—	—	—	—	—
2003–04	Phoenix Coyotes	NHL	8	1	6	1	—	486	21	0	2.59	.914	—	—	—	—	—	—	—	—
2005–06	Washington Capitals	NHL	26	9	12	—	1	1413	81	1	3.43	.905	—	—	—	—	—	—	—	—
2006–07	Washington Capitals	NHL	30	6	15	—	7	1644	99	0	3.61	.889	—	—	—	—	—	—	—	—
2007–08	Hershey Bears	AHL	1	0	1	—	0	59	3	0	3.04	.925	—	—	—	—	—	—	—	—
2007–08	Washington Capitals	NHL	19	7	8	—	2	1032	46	0	2.67	.908	—	—	—	—	—	—	—	—
2008–09	Washington Capitals	NHL	16	10	4	—	2	902	37	0	2.46	.908	—	—	—	—	—	—	—	—
2009–10	Pittsburgh Penguins	NHL	23	10	6	—	1	1108	51	0	2.76	.906	1	0	0	31	1	0	1.91	.857
2010–11	Pittsburgh Penguins	NHL	23	13	5	—	3	1297	47	1	2.17	.922	1	0	0	34	4	0	7.06	.636
2011–12	Pittsburgh Penguins	NHL	16	6	7	—	2	811	42	0	3.11	.883	1	0	0	20	2	0	6.00	.667
NHL totals			309	140	112	13	18	16,978	744	14	2.63	.904	15	5	6	738	27	3	2.20	.914

== See also ==
- Notable families in the NHL
