= Eric Tangradi =

American ice hockey player (born 1989)

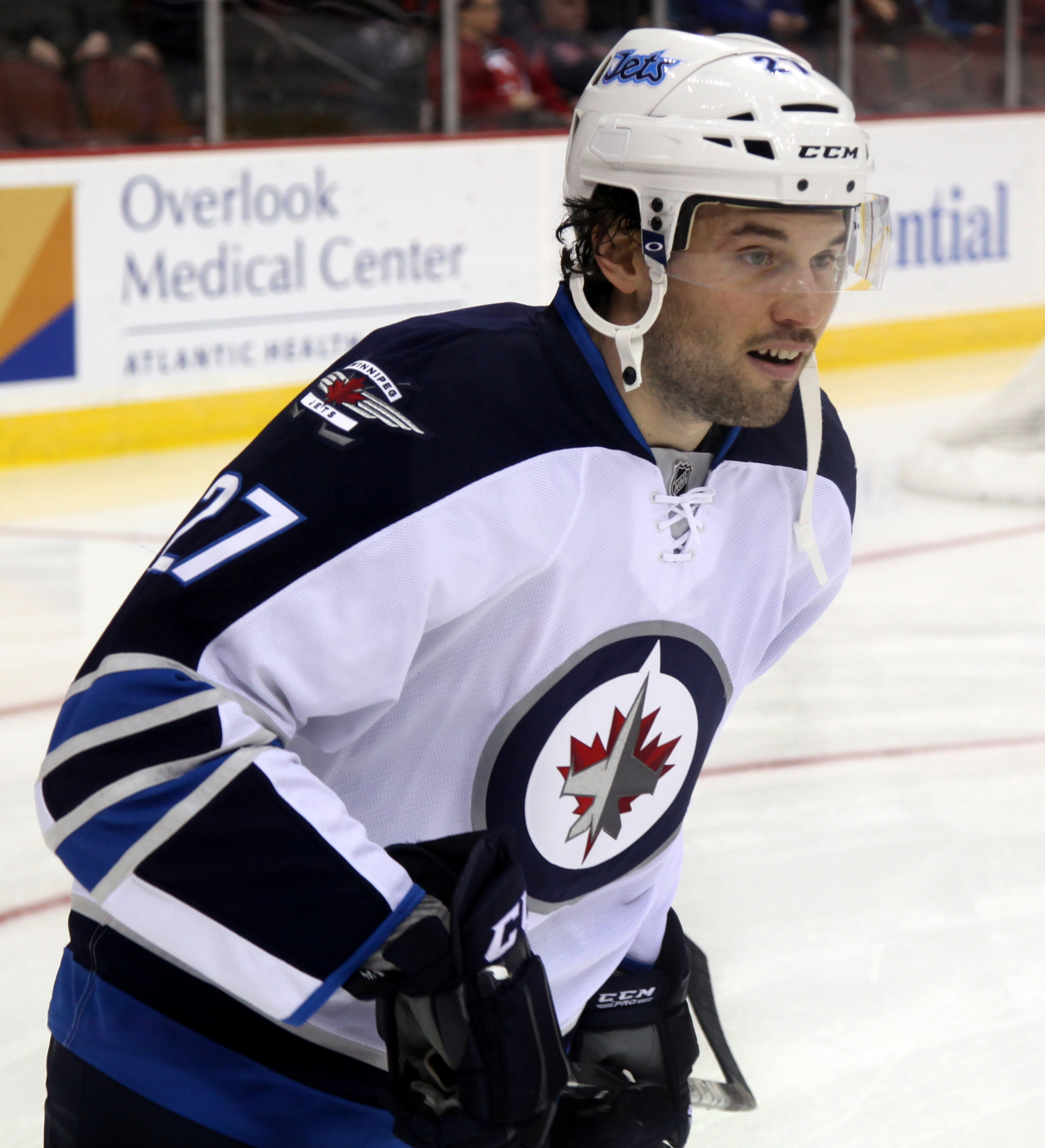
- Tangradi with the Winnipeg Jets in 2013
- Born: February 10, 1989 (age 37) Philadelphia, Pennsylvania, U.S.
- Height: 6 ft 4 in (193 cm)
- Weight: 230 lb (104 kg; 16 st 6 lb)
- Position: Left wing
- Shot: Left
- Played for: Pittsburgh Penguins; Winnipeg Jets; Montreal Canadiens; Detroit Red Wings; New Jersey Devils; Barys Nur-Sultan
- NHL draft: 42nd overall, 2007; Anaheim Ducks
- Playing career: 2009–2020

Eric Tangradi (born February 10, 1989) is an American former professional ice hockey left winger. He played for the Pittsburgh Penguins, Winnipeg Jets, Montreal Canadiens, Detroit Red Wings, New Jersey Devils, and Barys Nur-Sultan in the Kontinental Hockey League (KHL). Tangradi was drafted 42nd overall in the 2nd round of the 2007 NHL entry draft by the Anaheim Ducks.

== Playing career ==
=== Amateur ===
Tangradi, originally from the Philadelphia area, played High School Hockey for Archbishop Carroll and won a Pennsylvania State AA Championship in 2004 over 2-time champions Peters Township and played one season for Wyoming Seminary Prep School in Kingston, Pennsylvania.

He played three seasons of junior hockey with the Belleville Bulls of the Ontario Hockey League. In 2008, Tangradi was named captain of the Bulls team. In 2008-09, Tangradi had a break-out junior season, posting 38 goals and 88 points in just 55 games. During the season on December 9, 2008, he was also signed to a three-year entry-level deal with the Anaheim Ducks.

On February 26, 2009, Tangradi was traded along with Anaheim Ducks forward Chris Kunitz to the Pittsburgh Penguins in exchange for defenseman Ryan Whitney. Tangradi was named the Boston Pizza OHL & CHL Player of the Week for the week ending April 12. Tangradi at seasons end was named the Belleville Bulls Humanitarian of the Year, Most Outstanding Forward, and Top Scorer.

=== Professional ===
Tangradi tallied his first professional point in his first professional game in the AHL with the Wilkes-Barre/Scranton Penguins on October 3, 2009 against the Syracuse Crunch. He assisted on a Wyatt Smith goal in the second period. He later scored his first professional goal in the AHL on November 11, 2009 against Jean-Philippe Lamoureux of the Portland Pirates. Off of the following face-off, Tangradi entered his first professional fight taking on Kyle Rank.

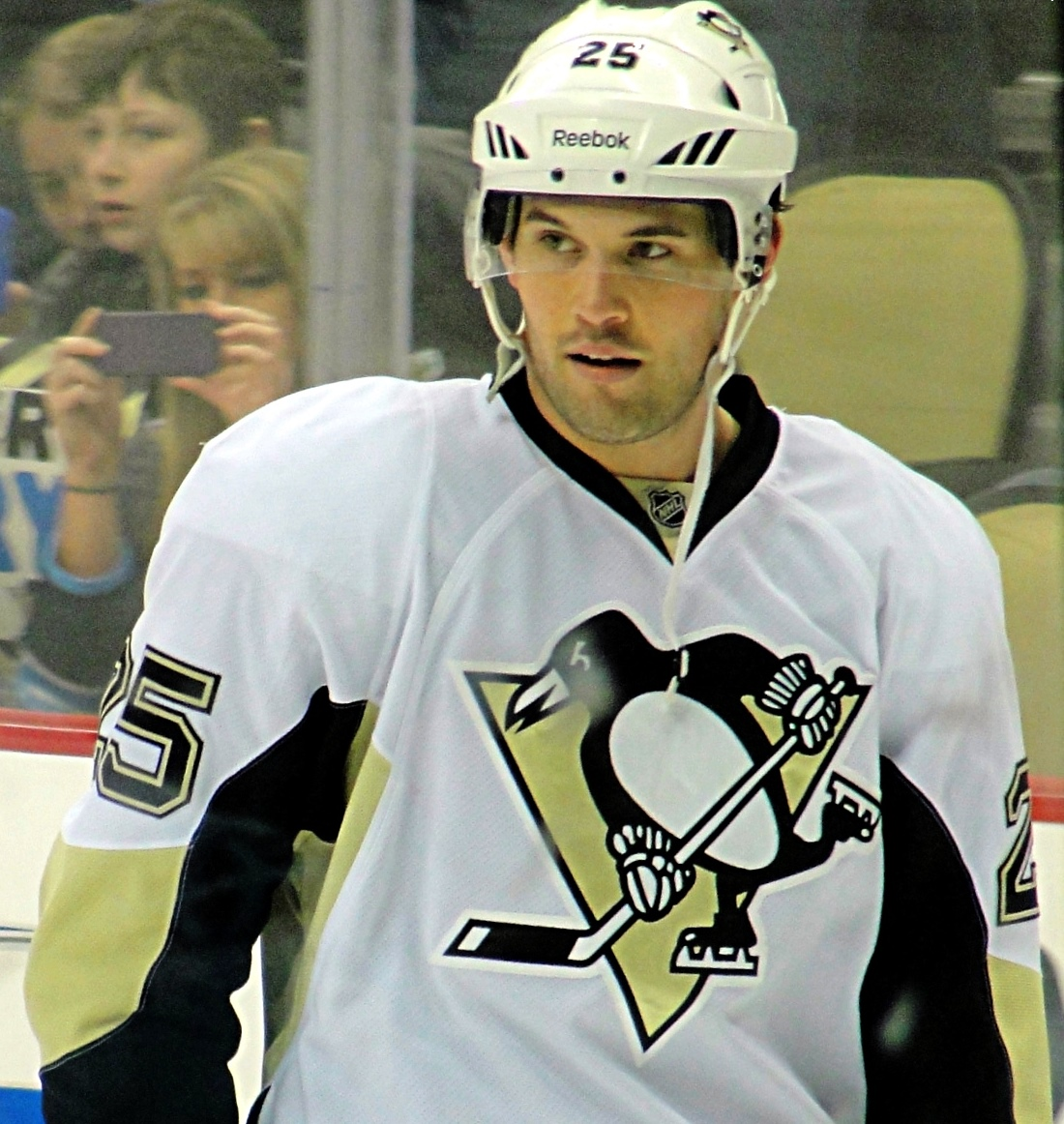
During his time with the Penguins.

Tangradi made his NHL debut during the last game of the season, on April 11, 2010 against the New York Islanders.

The following season, Tangradi made the NHL club out of training camp. On October 11, 2010, Tangradi scored his first NHL point against the New Jersey Devils assisting on an Alex Goligoski goal. On October 15, 2010, Tangradi scored his first NHL goal against goaltender Rick DiPietro of the New York Islanders. After being reassigned to Wilkes-Barre/Scranton on December 8, 2010, Tangradi scored his first professional hat trick against goalies Jussi Rynnas and Ben Scrivens of the Toronto Marlies.

During the now infamous February 11, 2011, game vs. the New York Islanders Tangradi was a victim of an elbow to the head by forward Trevor Gillies. Gillies was suspended 9 games for the hit. Tangradi was sidelined for two months, due to concussion symptoms. On January 13, 2012, Tangradi picked up his first NHL fighting major when he took on Erik Gudbranson of the Florida Panthers. On April 18, 2012, Tangradi tallied his first NHL playoff point against his hometown Philadelphia Flyers, assisting on a Jordan Staal goal. Tangradi's legacy with the Wilkes-Barre/Scranton Penguins is that he is ninth on W-B/S' all-time goals list with 60 in 178 games.

During the 2012–13 shortened season, Tangradi was traded by the Penguins to the Winnipeg Jets in exchange for a 2013 sixth-round pick.

Tangradi scored his first goal as a Winnipeg Jet on March 7, 2013 against Tampa Bay Lightning goaltender Anders Lindback. Tangradi played his first full season at the NHL level with Winnipeg in 2013-14 where he assumed a fourth-line left wing role.

On October 5, 2014, Tangradi was traded by the Jets to the Montreal Canadiens in exchange for Peter Budaj and Patrick Holland.

During the 2014–15 season, Tangradi recorded 14 goals and 17 assists in 48 games with the Canadiens' AHL affiliate, the Hamilton Bulldogs, and 17 penalty minutes in seven games with the Canadiens.

On July 8, 2015, the Detroit Red Wings signed Tangradi to a one-year contract. On October 4, 2015, Tangradi was assigned to the Red Wings' AHL affiliate, the Grand Rapids Griffins. On December 28, 2015, Tangradi was recalled by the Detroit Red Wings. He was assigned to the Griffins on December 30. On January 24, 2016, Tangradi was recalled by the Detroit Red Wings. Prior to being recalled, Tangradi led the Griffins with 31 points, and was tied for fifth in the AHL with 16 goals in 36 games. He was reassigned to the Griffins on January 26. On March 21, 2016, the Red Wings signed Tangradi to a two-year contract extension.

On July 25, 2018, Tangradi signed a one-year, two-way contract with the New Jersey Devils.

As a free agent from the Devils, Tangradi opted to sign his first contract overseas, agreeing to terms with Barys Nur-Sultan on August 19, 2019. After scoring nine points (five goals, four assists) in 22 games with Barys, Tangradi returned to North America by signing a one-year AHL contract with his old team, the Grand Rapids Griffins, on December 6, 2019.

Following his 11th professional season, Tangradi announced his retirement from professional hockey, embarking on a new career in real estate on May 5, 2021.

== Personal life ==
Growing up in Philadelphia as the son of a postal worker, Tangradi was a fan of the Philadelphia Flyers, and had Eric Lindros' and Keith Primeau's jerseys along with the Flyers' Legion of Doom poster hanging on his room's wall. In addition to ice hockey he also played lacrosse as a youth.

Tangradi is a dog lover, and owns a Boxer named Carson in honor of the street in Pittsburgh where he met his wife, Caitlyn Hess. The couple married on June 21, 2014. A Penn State graduate with an interest for fashion, Hess started SCHEÉ (pronounced SHE-ay), a shoe company with a philanthropic twist where a percentage of each sale goes to a charity.

In June 2022 Tangradi announced that he would become head coach of Shady Side Academy's boys’ prep hockey team.

== Career statistics ==
			Regular season					Playoffs
Season	Team	League	GP	G	A	Pts	PIM	GP	G	A	Pts	PIM
2005–06	Wyoming Seminary	USHS	38	21	23	44	120	—	—	—	—	—
2006–07	Belleville Bulls	OHL	65	5	15	20	32	15	8	9	17	14
2007–08	Belleville Bulls	OHL	56	24	36	60	41	21	7	11	18	20
2008–09	Belleville Bulls	OHL	55	38	50	88	61	16	8	13	21	12
2009–10	Wilkes-Barre/Scranton Penguins	AHL	65	17	22	39	31	4	1	1	2	6
2009–10	Pittsburgh Penguins	NHL	1	0	0	0	0	—	—	—	—	—
2010–11	Pittsburgh Penguins	NHL	15	1	2	3	10	1	0	0	0	0
2010–11	Wilkes-Barre/Scranton Penguins	AHL	42	18	15	33	86	—	—	—	—	—
2011–12	Wilkes-Barre/Scranton Penguins	AHL	37	15	16	31	40	10	4	5	9	14
2011–12	Pittsburgh Penguins	NHL	24	0	2	2	16	2	0	1	1	0
2012–13	Wilkes-Barre/Scranton Penguins	AHL	34	10	8	18	57	—	—	—	—	—
2012–13	Pittsburgh Penguins	NHL	5	0	0	0	0	—	—	—	—	—
2012–13	Winnipeg Jets	NHL	36	1	3	4	22	—	—	—	—	—
2013–14	Winnipeg Jets	NHL	55	3	3	6	21	—	—	—	—	—
2014–15	Hamilton Bulldogs	AHL	48	14	17	31	56	—	—	—	—	—
2014–15	Montreal Canadiens	NHL	7	0	0	0	17	—	—	—	—	—
2015–16	Grand Rapids Griffins	AHL	72	28	28	56	66	7	2	3	5	4
2015–16	Detroit Red Wings	NHL	1	0	0	0	0	—	—	—	—	—
2016–17	Grand Rapids Griffins	AHL	54	17	27	44	53	19	2	17	19	12
2017–18	Grand Rapids Griffins	AHL	74	31	33	64	51	4	2	2	4	4
2018–19	Binghamton Devils	AHL	41	10	14	24	49	—	—	—	—	—
2018–19	New Jersey Devils	NHL	6	0	1	1	0	—	—	—	—	—
2019–20	Barys Nur-Sultan	KHL	22	5	4	9	24	—	—	—	—	—
2019–20	Grand Rapids Griffins	AHL	21	9	4	13	12	—	—	—	—	—
NHL totals			150	5	11	16	86	3	0	1	1	0

== Awards and honors ==
- Tangradi was a member of the United States team in the 2009 World Junior Hockey Championships.
- Tangradi was named the Reebok/AHL Player of the Week for the period ending Dec. 12, 2010.
- Named to the 2011 AHL All-Star game.
- Named Huntington Bank Grand Rapids Griffins Player of the Month for March 2017.
- Tangradi was a member of the 2017 Calder Cup Champion Grand Rapids Griffins.
- Named Huntington Bank Grand Rapids Griffins Player of the Month for December 2017.
