= Trevor Gillies =

Canadian ice hockey player (born 1979)

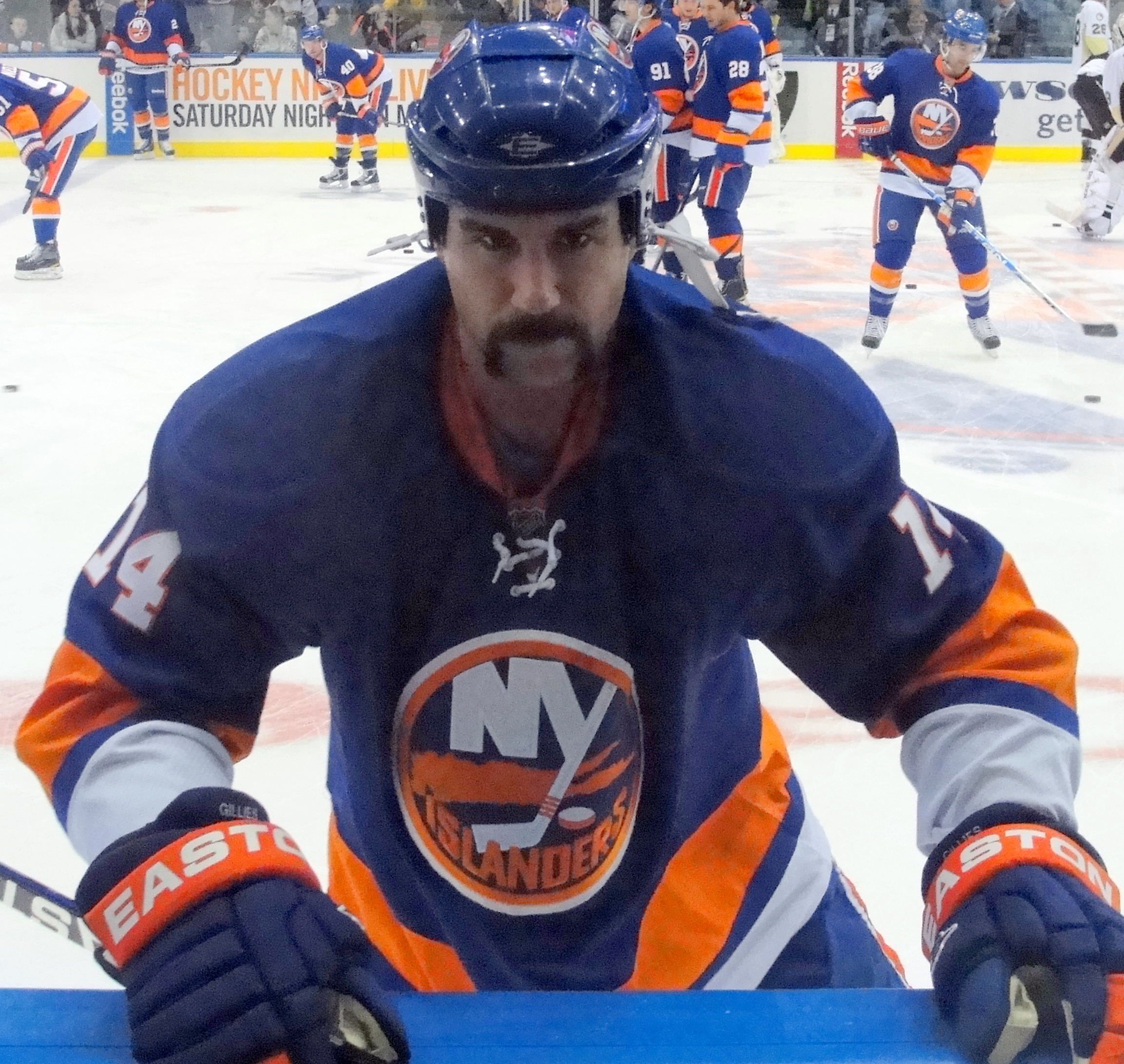
- Gillies warming up with the New York Islanders in February 2011.
- Born: January 30, 1979 (age 47) Cambridge, Ontario, Canada
- Height: 6 ft 3 in (191 cm)
- Weight: 227 lb (103 kg; 16 st 3 lb)
- Position: Left wing
- Shot: Left
- Played for: Mighty Ducks of Anaheim; New York Islanders; Vityaz Chekhov; HIFK
- NHL draft: Undrafted
- Playing career: 1999–2018

Trevor Gillies (born January 30, 1979) is a Canadian former professional ice hockey player. He has played in the National Hockey League (NHL) with both the Mighty Ducks of Anaheim and New York Islanders. Gillies was known for being an enforcer, as evidenced by his NHL career statistics of 57 games with only three points and 261 penalty minutes. Gillies was also known for his distinctive horseshoe moustache during his time with the Islanders.

== Playing career ==
Undrafted, Gillies played junior hockey in the Ontario Hockey League. In 1999–2000 Gillies made his professional debut with the Mississippi Sea Wolves in the East Coast Hockey League. With limited offensive ability Gillies plied his trade between the ECHL and American Hockey League (AHL) for five years before signing an NHL contract with the New York Rangers on July 20, 2004.

Prior to the 2005–06 season and in his second year with the Rangers affiliate, the Hartford Wolf Pack, Gillies was traded from the Rangers to the Mighty Ducks of Anaheim for Steve Rucchin on August 5, 2005. He was assigned to AHL affiliate, the Portland Pirates, and played in one NHL game for the Ducks, recording 21 penalty minutes in 2 minutes, 40 seconds of ice time.

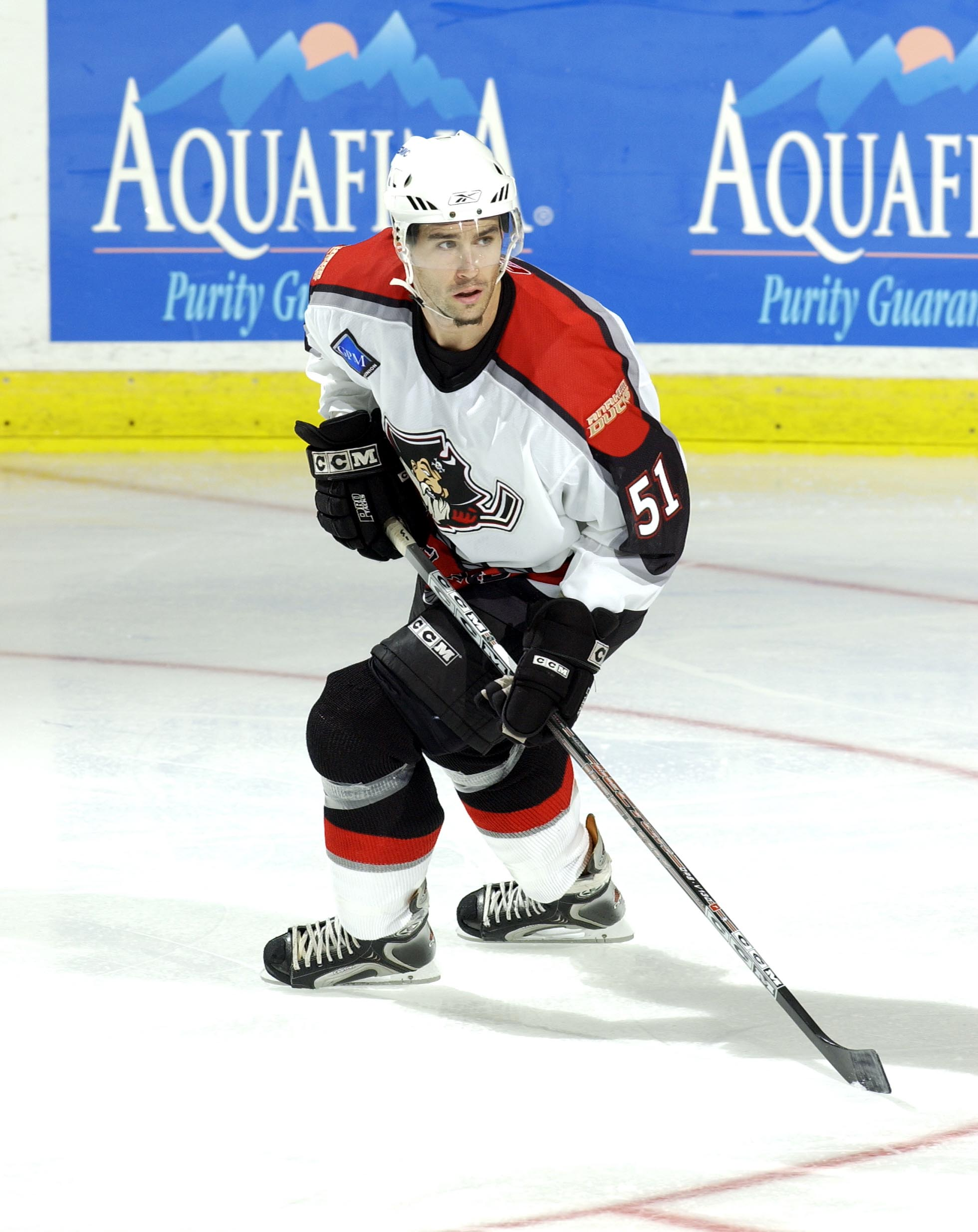
Gillies with the Portland Pirates in September 2006

On July 2, 2007, Gillies was signed by the Carolina Hurricanes to a one-year contract. Gillies never played a regular season game with the Hurricanes, as he was assigned to the Albany River Rats.

On September 14, 2009, Gillies signed with the Bridgeport Sound Tigers of the AHL for the 2009–10 season. After 18 games with the Tigers, he had accumulated 123 penalty minutes, and went on to be signed by NHL affiliate, the New York Islanders, on January 28, 2010. On March 14, 2010, Gillies scored his first NHL point, when he assisted on a Tim Jackman goal in a 4-2 victory over the Toronto Maple Leafs. Gillies re-signed with the Islanders on a one-year contract through to the end of the 2010–2011 season on April 15, 2010.

On February 12, 2011, Gillies was suspended nine games by the NHL for an incident which occurred in a February 11, 2011 game against the Pittsburgh Penguins. During the third period of the game, Gillies elbowed Penguins' forward Eric Tangradi in the face, punched him several times while he was down on the ice, and proceeded to taunt him from the dressing room hallway. Tangradi suffered concussion like symptoms and remained out of the Penguins line-up indefinitely. In his first game back from the suspension, Gillies was ejected for a hit on Cal Clutterbuck in a game against the Minnesota Wild on March 2, 2011. After an in-person hearing, Gillies was suspended for 10 games for the incident.

After playing in only three games to start the 2011–12 season Gillies was placed on waivers on October 31, 2011. After clearing waivers, Gillies was assigned to Bridgeport in the AHL where he would finish the season.

On June 19, 2012, Gillies opted to forgo North American free agency and signed a one-year contract to play with Vityaz Chekhov of the Russian Kontinental Hockey League.

On August 28, 2013, Gillies signed a contract with Helsinki IFK in the Finnish SM-Liiga for the 2013–14 season. On November 4, 2013, Helsinki IFK terminated the contract with Gillies. During his time on HIFK he played three Finnish Liiga matches and four European Trophy matches.

On October 10, 2014, after signing with the Adirondack Flames, Gillies slammed the face of Rochester Americans' William Carrier into the ice, receiving a 12-game suspension.

On September 18, 2015, Gillies continued his career by signing a one-year ECHL contract with the South Carolina Stingrays.

On August 28, 2018, Gillies announced his retirement from professional hockey.

== Career statistics ==
			Regular season					Playoffs
Season	Team	League	GP	G	A	Pts	PIM	GP	G	A	Pts	PIM
1995-96	Caledon Canadians	MetJHL	49	2	6	8	186	—	—	—	—	—
1996–97	North Bay Centennials	OHL	26	0	3	3	72	—	—	—	—	—
1997–98	North Bay Centennials	OHL	2	0	0	0	4	—	—	—	—	—
1997–98	Sarnia Sting	OHL	17	0	1	1	33	—	—	—	—	—
1997–98	Oshawa Generals	OHL	45	1	2	3	184	7	0	1	1	12
1998–99	Oshawa Generals	OHL	66	6	9	15	270	11	0	2	2	28
1999–00	Mississippi Sea Wolves	ECHL	53	0	6	6	202	—	—	—	—	—
1999–00	Lowell Lock Monsters	AHL	8	0	0	0	38	—	—	—	—	—
2000–01	Greensboro Generals	ECHL	63	1	6	7	303	—	—	—	—	—
2000–01	Worcester IceCats	AHL	—	—	—	—	—	6	0	0	0	24
2001–02	Augusta Lynx	ECHL	46	0	1	1	269	—	—	—	—	—
2001–02	Richmond Renegades	ECHL	18	0	1	1	51	—	—	—	—	—
2001–02	Providence Bruins	AHL	5	0	0	0	21	—	—	—	—	—
2002–03	Lowell Lock Monsters	AHL	25	0	1	1	132	—	—	—	—	—
2002–03	Richmond Renegades	ECHL	6	0	0	0	20	—	—	—	—	—
2002–03	Peoria Rivermen	ECHL	24	0	1	1	180	—	—	—	—	—
2003–04	Springfield Falcons	AHL	61	2	1	3	277	—	—	—	—	—
2004–05	Hartford Wolf Pack	AHL	49	0	2	2	277	—	—	—	—	—
2005–06	Portland Pirates	AHL	50	2	3	5	169	4	0	0	0	0
2005–06	Mighty Ducks of Anaheim	NHL	1	0	0	0	21	—	—	—	—	—
2006–07	Portland Pirates	AHL	51	1	6	7	151	—	—	—	—	—
2006–07	Augusta Lynx	ECHL	7	0	2	2	23	—	—	—	—	—
2007–08	Albany River Rats	AHL	51	1	1	2	112	7	0	0	0	19
2008–09	Albany River Rats	AHL	30	0	0	0	125	—	—	—	—	—
2009–10	Bridgeport Sound Tigers	AHL	24	1	0	1	169	—	—	—	—	—
2009–10	New York Islanders	NHL	14	0	1	1	75	—	—	—	—	—
2010–11	New York Islanders	NHL	39	2	0	2	165	—	—	—	—	—
2011–12	New York Islanders	NHL	3	0	0	0	0	—	—	—	—	—
2011–12	Bridgeport Sound Tigers	AHL	26	1	0	1	65	—	—	—	—	—
2012–13	Vityaz Chekhov	KHL	24	0	0	0	95	—	—	—	—	—
2013–14	HIFK	Liiga	3	0	0	0	54	—	—	—	—	—
2013–14	Orlando Solar Bears	ECHL	5	0	0	0	21	—	—	—	—	—
2013–14	Abbotsford Heat	AHL	9	0	0	0	12	3	0	0	0	0
2014–15	Adirondack Flames	AHL	20	1	0	1	45	—	—	—	—	—
2015–16	South Carolina Stingrays	ECHL	46	0	2	2	106	19	0	1	1	25
2016–17	South Carolina Stingrays	ECHL	34	0	0	0	94	5	0	0	0	19
2017–18	South Carolina Stingrays	ECHL	20	0	0	0	71	—	—	—	—	—
AHL totals			409	9	14	23	1593	20	0	0	0	43
ECHL totals			322	1	19	20	1340	24	0	1	1	44
NHL totals			57	2	1	3	261	—	—	—	—	—
