= Zbyněk Michálek =

Czech ice hockey player (born 1982)

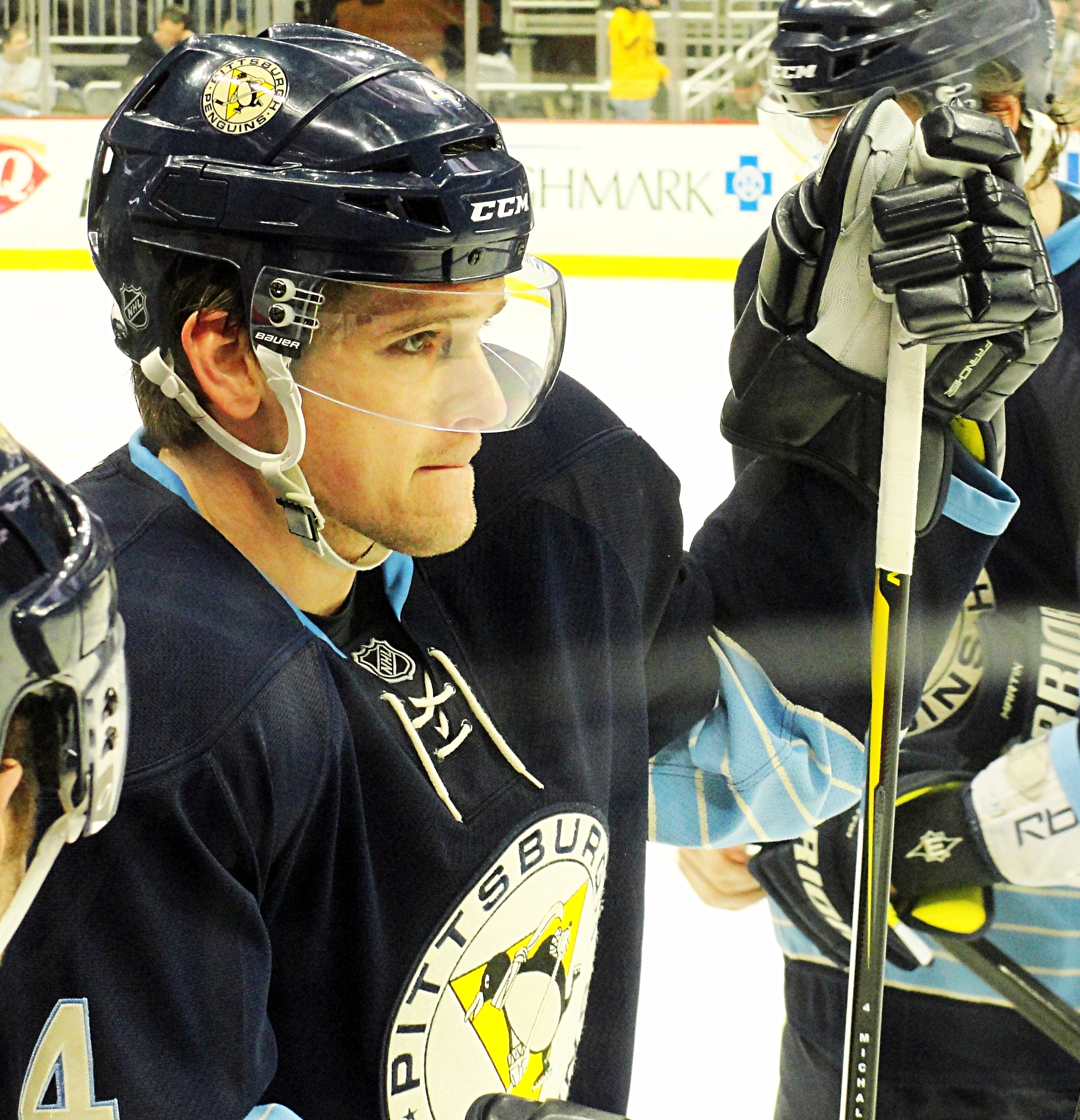
- With the Penguins in 2012
- Born: 23 December 1982 (age 43) Jindřichův Hradec, Czechoslovakia
- Height: 6 ft 2 in (188 cm)
- Weight: 210 lb (95 kg; 15 st 0 lb)
- Position: Defence
- Shot: Right
- Played for: Minnesota Wild; Arizona Coyotes; Pittsburgh Penguins; St. Louis Blues; HC Sparta Praha
- National team: Czech Republic
- NHL draft: Undrafted
- Playing career: 2002–2019

Zbyněk Michálek (Czech pronunciation: [ˈzbɪɲɛk ˈmɪxaːlɛk], born 23 December 1982) is a Czech former professional ice hockey defenceman. He most recently played for Sparta Praha of the Czech Extraliga (ELH). Michálek has also previously played in the NHL for the Minnesota Wild, Arizona Coyotes, Pittsburgh Penguins, and St. Louis Blues. He is the older brother of former NHL star Milan Michálek.

== Playing career ==
=== Junior ===
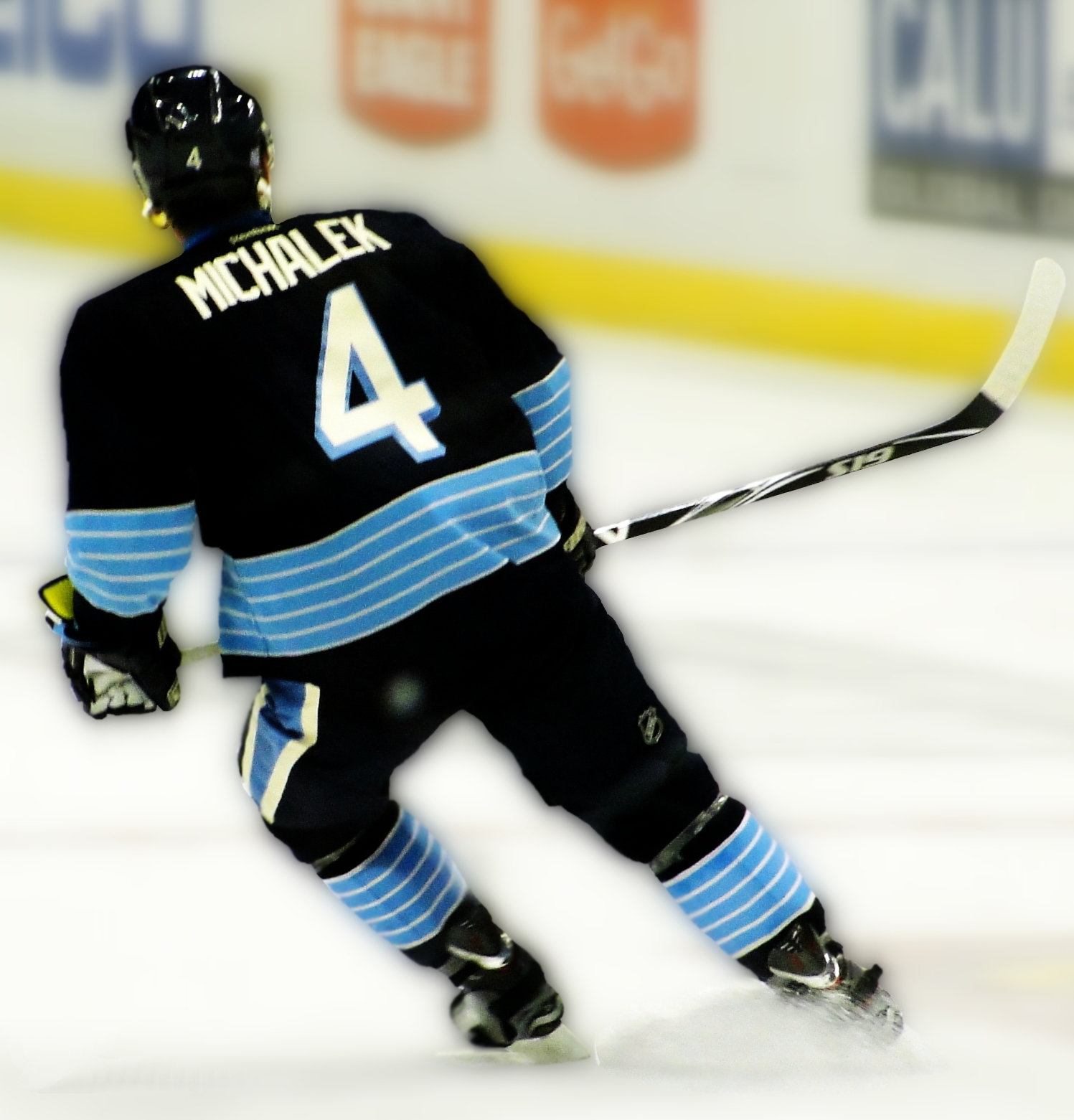
Michálek, October 2011.

Michálek played two seasons of major junior ice hockey for the Shawinigan Cataractes of the Quebec Major Junior Hockey League (QMJHL). He was not drafted in any NHL entry draft, but began playing professional hockey in 2002 with the Houston Aeros of the American Hockey League (AHL), winning a Calder Cup championship with the team in 2003.

=== Professional ===
==== Minnesota Wild, Phoenix Coyotes ====
Michálek made his NHL debut during the 2003–04 season with the Minnesota Wild, the Aeros' NHL affiliate. In 2005, Michálek was traded to the Phoenix Coyotes in exchange for Erik Westrum and Dustin Wood. He played five seasons for the Coyotes, leading the NHL in blocked shots during the 2008–09 season. His excellent play continued into 2010, as he helped the Coyotes earn a Stanley Cup playoff berth for the first time since 2002.

==== Pittsburgh Penguins ====
On 1 July 2010, the first day of the NHL free agency period, Michálek signed a five-year, $20 million contract with the Pittsburgh Penguins as an unrestricted free agent. Prior to his signing, Michálek was described as "The Defenseman Every Team Wants" by AOL Fanhouse due to his strong defensive skills, durability and shot-blocking. In 2010–11, Michálek scored his first goal for the Penguins in a 3–1 win over the Buffalo Sabres on 8 March 2011.

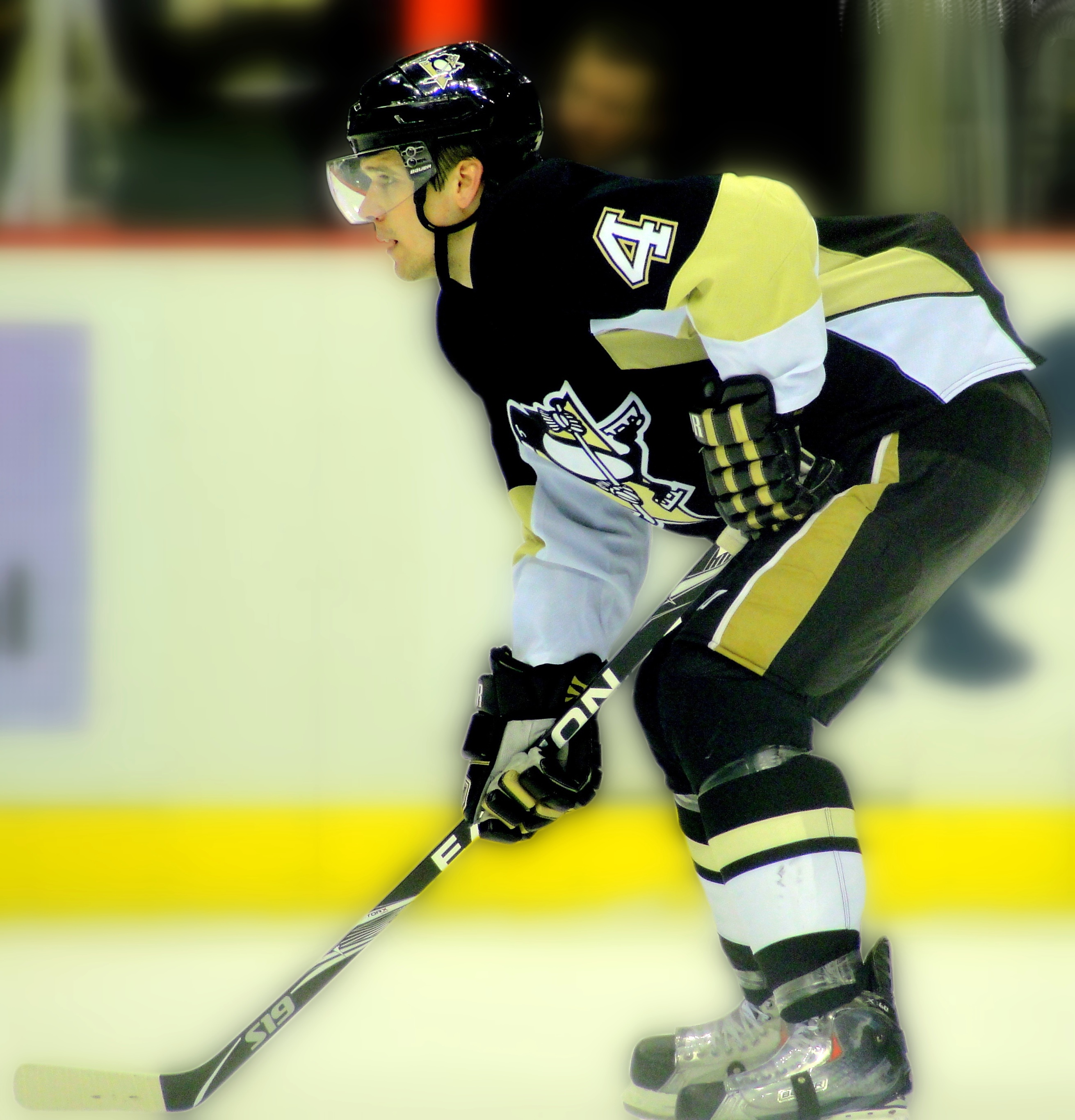
Zbyněk Michálek, April 2011.

==== Return to Phoenix, St. Louis Blues, second return to Arizona ====
On 22 June 2012, during the 2012 NHL entry draft, Michálek was traded back to the Coyotes in exchange for Harrison Ruopp, goaltender Marc Cheverie and a 2012 third-round draft pick (81st overall). Michálek played two further seasons in the Coyotes organization, whereupon in 2014–15, as a pending unrestricted free agent, he was traded at the NHL trade deadline on 2 March 2015, to the St. Louis Blues, along with a conditional third-round pick in 2015, in exchange for prospect Maxim Letunov, despite Michálek recovering from a concussion at the time. On 1 July 2015 Michálek was re-signed by the Coyotes as a free agent.

After the 2016 preseason, Michálek was cut from the Arizona Coyotes, and thus placed on waivers by the Arizona Coyotes. On Sunday 19 March 2017, he was called up by the Coyotes from the Tucson Roadrunners to play the following day. He ended up playing two games after that one, accumulating a total of no points, no minutes spent in the sinbin, and a plus-one rating in three total games.

On 19 October 2017, Michálek signed with Sparta Praha of the Czech Extraliga (ELH).

== International play ==
Medal record

Representing Czech Republic

World Championships
Silver medal – second place	2006 Riga	
Bronze medal – third place	2011 Bratislava	

Michálek played for the Czech Republic, alongside his brother Milan Michálek, at the 2010 Winter Olympics. He was also selected to represent the Czech Republic at the 2011 IIHF World Championship, where he won bronze alongside his brother.

== Personal life ==
Michálek is married to Helena (born in 1979 in Bosnia and Herzegovina) and they have three children together, a son and two daughters. Michálek's younger brother Milan formerly played in the NHL.

== Career statistics ==
=== Regular season and playoffs ===
			Regular season					Playoffs
Season	Team	League	GP	G	A	Pts	PIM	GP	G	A	Pts	PIM
1999–2000	HC Becherovka Karlovy Vary	CZE U20	40	2	10	12	20	—	—	—	—	—
2000–01	Shawinigan Cataractes	QMJHL	69	10	29	39	52	3	0	0	0	0
2001–02	Shawinigan Cataractes	QMJHL	68	16	35	51	54	10	8	7	15	10
2002–03	Houston Aeros	AHL	62	4	10	14	26	23	1	1	2	6
2003–04	Houston Aeros	AHL	55	5	16	21	32	2	1	0	1	0
2003–04	Minnesota Wild	NHL	22	1	1	2	4	—	—	—	—	—
2004–05	Houston Aeros	AHL	76	7	17	24	48	5	1	2	3	4
2005–06	Phoenix Coyotes	NHL	82	9	15	24	62	—	—	—	—	—
2006–07	Phoenix Coyotes	NHL	82	4	24	28	34	—	—	—	—	—
2007–08	Phoenix Coyotes	NHL	75	4	13	17	34	—	—	—	—	—
2008–09	Phoenix Coyotes	NHL	82	6	21	27	28	—	—	—	—	—
2009–10	Phoenix Coyotes	NHL	72	3	14	17	30	7	0	2	2	2
2010–11	Pittsburgh Penguins	NHL	73	5	14	19	30	7	0	1	1	0
2011–12	Pittsburgh Penguins	NHL	62	2	11	13	24	6	0	1	1	2
2012–13	Phoenix Coyotes	NHL	34	0	2	2	14	—	—	—	—	—
2013–14	Phoenix Coyotes	NHL	59	2	8	10	24	—	—	—	—	—
2014–15	Arizona Coyotes	NHL	53	2	6	8	12	—	—	—	—	—
2014–15	St. Louis Blues	NHL	15	2	2	4	6	6	0	0	0	4
2015–16	Arizona Coyotes	NHL	70	2	5	7	20	—	—	—	—	—
2016–17	Tucson Roadrunners	AHL	43	6	8	14	32	—	—	—	—	—
2016–17	Arizona Coyotes	NHL	3	0	0	0	0	—	—	—	—	—
2017–18	HC Sparta Praha	ELH	30	5	13	18	16	3	0	0	0	2
2018–19	HC Kometa Brno	ELH	13	0	0	0	2	10	0	1	1	0
NHL totals			784	42	136	178	322	26	0	4	4	6

=== International ===
Year	Team	Event	Result	GP	G	A	Pts	PIM
2006	Czech Republic	WC	2nd place, silver medalist(s)	9	3	0	3	6
2007	Czech Republic	WC	7th	7	0	1	1	4
2008	Czech Republic	WC	5th	7	0	0	0	6
2010	Czech Republic	OG	7th	5	0	0	0	2
2011	Czech Republic	WC	3rd place, bronze medalist(s)	8	0	1	1	6
2013	Czech Republic	WC	7th	8	3	1	4	2
2014	Czech Republic	OG	6th	5	0	1	1	2
2016	Czech Republic	WCH	6th	3	1	0	1	2
Senior totals				52	7	4	11	30

== See also ==
- Notable families in the NHL
