= Micheal Haley =

Canadian ice hockey player (born 1986)

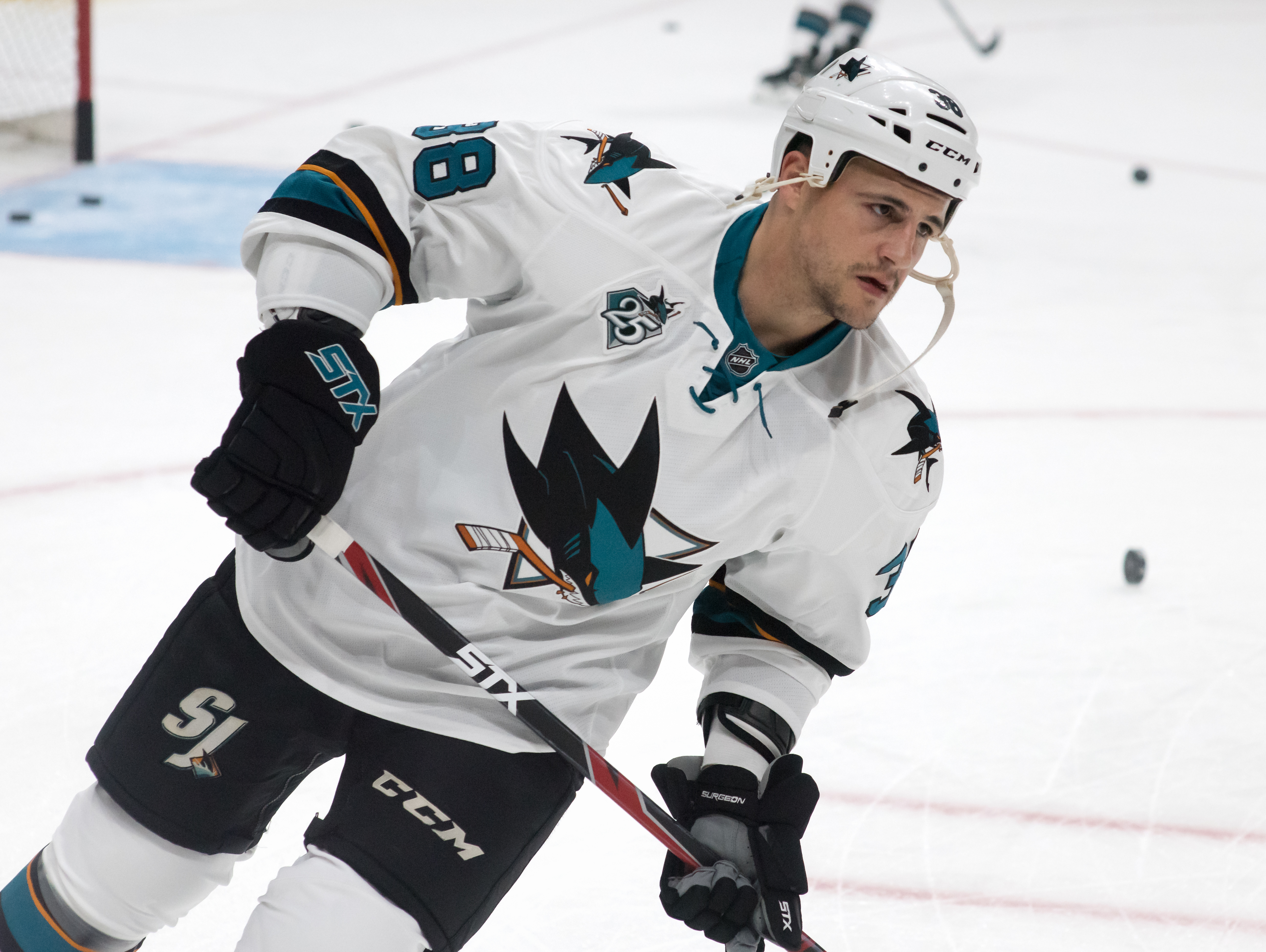
- Haley with the San Jose Sharks during the 2016 Stanley Cup playoffs
- Born: March 30, 1986 (age 40) Guelph, Ontario, Canada
- Height: 5 ft 10 in (178 cm)
- Weight: 204 lb (93 kg; 14 st 8 lb)
- Position: Centre
- Shot: Left
- Played for: New York Islanders; New York Rangers; San Jose Sharks; Florida Panthers; Ottawa Senators
- NHL draft: Undrafted
- Playing career: 2007–2021

Micheal Haley (born March 30, 1986) is a Canadian former professional ice hockey forward. He played for the New York Islanders, New York Rangers, Florida Panthers, San Jose Sharks, and Ottawa Senators in the National Hockey League (NHL). Haley's playing style is often described as an enforcer. In a February 11, 2011, Islanders–Penguins game in 2011, he received 39 penalty minutes.

In 2021, he joined the Sarnia Sting of the Ontario Hockey League as an assistant coach.

== Career ==
Haley was signed as a free agent to a two-way contract by the New York Islanders on May 19, 2008. At the end of the 2009–10 season Haley made his NHL debut with the Islanders against the New Jersey Devils, recording his first career NHL fight against Rod Pelley, on April 10, 2010. His first NHL goal was on February 11, 2011, against Brent Johnson of the Pittsburgh Penguins. In the 2011–12 season Haley played in 14 games with the Islanders.

Considered an enforcer, on July 1, 2012, Haley signed as a free agent to a two-year contract with Islanders rival, the New York Rangers. He was placed on waivers but went unclaimed in September 2012. He was assigned to the Rangers American Hockey League (AHL) affiliate, the Hartford Wolf Pack. In November 2013, Healey suffered a sports hernia that required surgery and missed over a month. He was named an alternate captain of the Wolf Pack in his second season with them. He played in nine games with the Rangers.

After two seasons within the Rangers' organization, Haley signed a one-year, two-way free agent contract with the San Jose Sharks on July 10, 2014. In his third season in the Sharks organization in the 2016–17 season, Haley played his first full season in the NHL, recording a career best 2 goals, 10 assists and 12 points in 58 contests, while leading the Sharks in penalty minutes with 128.

On July 1, 2017, Haley left the Sharks as a free agent and signed a two-year, $1.65 million contract with the Florida Panthers. Haley was brought over by the Panthers to add toughness to the team. During the 2017–18 season, Haley played in 75 games, the most of his career, and also led the NHL in fighting majors with 22 and penalty minutes with 212. At the beginning of the 2018–19 season, Haley entered the NHL/NHL Players' Association assistance program. Haley was limited to just 24 games that season approaching the trade deadline recording one goal and three points before he was placed on waivers by Florida on February 19, 2019. He was claimed the following day, returning for a second stint with the San Jose Sharks on February 20, 2019. He played a further 24 games with the Sharks, scoring one goal and three points.

On October 1, 2019, he moved back to the New York Rangers as a free agent, returning for a second stint on a one-year deal. In the following 2019–20 season, Haley remained on the Rangers roster and made 22 appearances as the club's reserve veteran forward, posting 1 goal. He suffered a serious injury and it was announced on February 8, 2020 that he would undergo surgery, missing the remainder of the season. Concluding his contract with the Rangers, Haley extended his professional career in agreeing to a one-year, two-way contract with the Ottawa Senators on November 13, 2020. He appeared in four games with the Senators. He missed the majority of the season with a groin injury. Following the season, Haley retired from the NHL.

== Coaching career ==
In the 2021 offseason, he joined his former Ontario Hockey League (OHL) team, the Sarnia Sting, as a player development coach. In October 2021, he was promoted to an assistant coach with the Sting.

== Career statistics ==
Bold indicates led league

			Regular season					Playoffs
Season	Team	League	GP	G	A	Pts	PIM	GP	G	A	Pts	PIM
2002–03	Sarnia Sting	OHL	43	3	3	6	32	6	0	0	0	2
2003–04	Sarnia Sting	OHL	51	8	8	16	69	—	—	—	—	—
2004–05	Sarnia Sting	OHL	61	14	16	30	122	—	—	—	—	—
2005–06	Sarnia Sting	OHL	23	2	6	8	83	—	—	—	—	—
2005–06	Toronto St. Michael's Majors	OHL	30	12	0	12	78	4	0	1	1	11
2006–07	Toronto St. Michael's Majors	OHL	68	30	24	54	174	—	—	—	—	—
2006–07	South Carolina Stingrays	ECHL	7	5	1	6	13	—	—	—	—	—
2007–08	Utah Grizzlies	ECHL	28	11	8	19	115	14	7	6	13	49
2007–08	Bridgeport Sound Tigers	AHL	36	2	2	4	75	—	—	—	—	—
2008–09	Bridgeport Sound Tigers	AHL	45	5	3	8	99	5	1	0	1	10
2009–10	Bridgeport Sound Tigers	AHL	65	6	8	14	196	3	0	0	0	4
2009–10	New York Islanders	NHL	2	0	0	0	9	—	—	—	—	—
2010–11	Bridgeport Sound Tigers	AHL	50	12	10	22	144	—	—	—	—	—
2010–11	New York Islanders	NHL	27	2	1	3	85	—	—	—	—	—
2011–12	Bridgeport Sound Tigers	AHL	51	15	10	25	125	3	0	0	0	2
2011–12	New York Islanders	NHL	14	0	0	0	57	—	—	—	—	—
2012–13	Connecticut Whale	AHL	69	10	13	23	170	—	—	—	—	—
2012–13	New York Rangers	NHL	9	0	0	0	12	2	0	0	0	0
2013–14	Hartford Wolf Pack	AHL	53	7	11	18	131	—	—	—	—	—
2014–15	Worcester Sharks	AHL	68	18	13	31	106	4	2	1	3	2
2014–15	San Jose Sharks	NHL	4	0	0	0	11	—	—	—	—	—
2015–16	San Jose Barracuda	AHL	41	12	11	23	52	—	—	—	—	—
2015–16	San Jose Sharks	NHL	16	1	0	1	48	—	—	—	—	—
2016–17	San Jose Sharks	NHL	58	2	10	12	128	—	—	—	—	—
2017–18	Florida Panthers	NHL	75	3	6	9	**212**	—	—	—	—	—
2018–19	Florida Panthers	NHL	24	1	2	3	30	—	—	—	—	—
2018–19	Springfield Thunderbirds	AHL	2	1	1	2	7	—	—	—	—	—
2018–19	San Jose Sharks	NHL	19	1	2	3	45	11	0	0	0	18
2019–20	New York Rangers	NHL	22	1	0	1	50	—	—	—	—	—
2020–21	Ottawa Senators	NHL	4	0	0	0	5	—	—	—	—	—
NHL totals			274	11	21	32	692	13	0	0	0	18
AHL totals			480	118	82	200	1107	15	3	1	4	18
