= List of Pittsburgh Penguins records =

This is a list of franchise records for the Pittsburgh Penguins of the National Hockey League.

== Career leaders (1967–present) ==
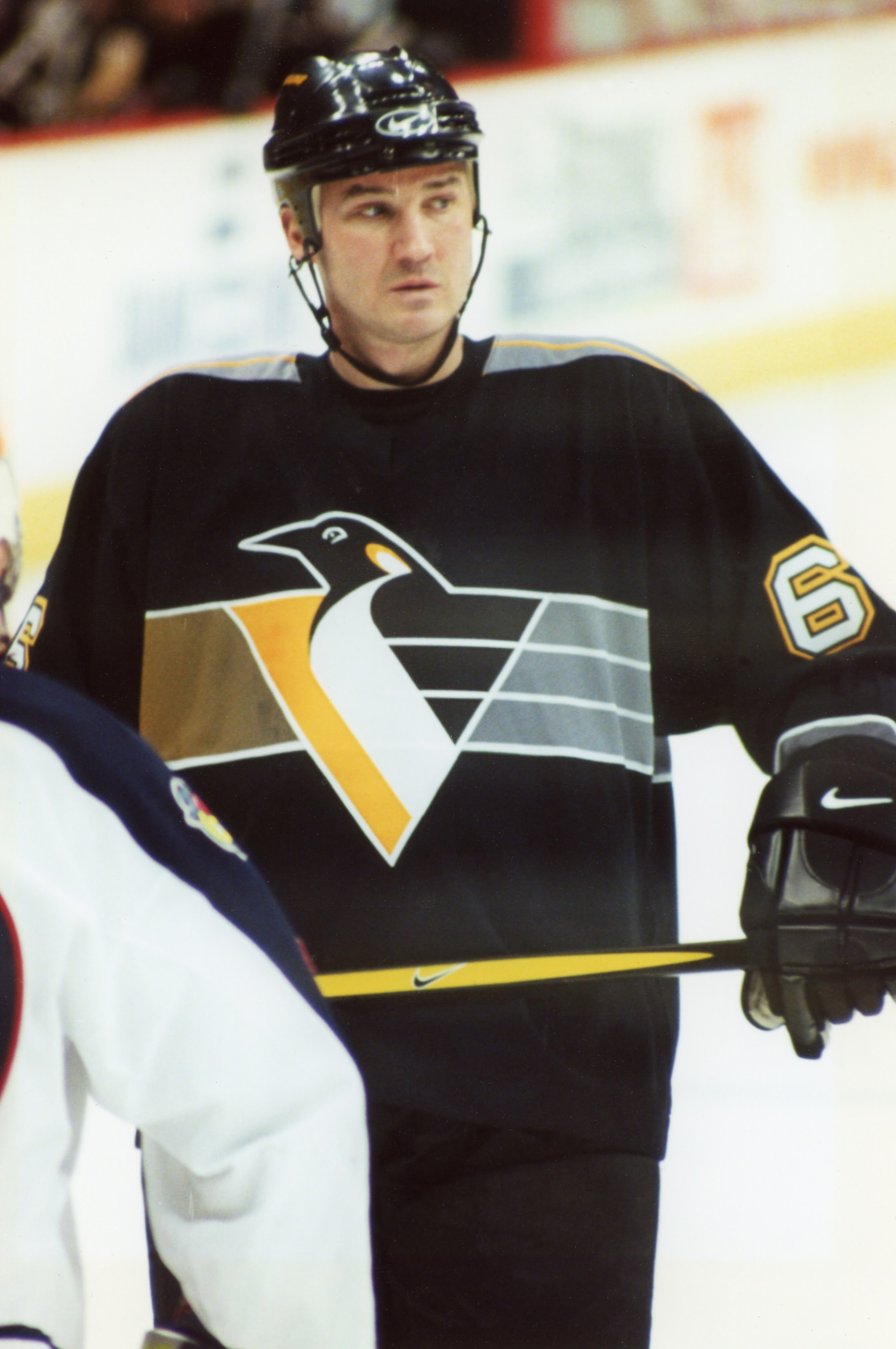
Mario Lemieux set many Penguins scoring records over his 17 years with the team

- Seasons: Sidney Crosby, 21
- Games: Sidney Crosby, 1,353
- Goals: Mario Lemieux, 690
- Assists: Sidney Crosby, 1,062
- Points: Sidney Crosby, 1,724
- Penalty minutes: Evgeni Malkin, 1,090
- Goaltender games: Marc-André Fleury, 691
- Goaltender wins: Marc-André Fleury, 375
- Shutouts: Marc-André Fleury, 44
- Consecutive games played: Phil Kessel, 328
- Most wins by head coach: Mike Sullivan, 252

== Single season records (regular season) ==
=== Team ===
- Most wins by team: 56 in 1992–93
- Most losses by team: 58 in 1983–84
- Most points by team: 119 in 1992–93
- Most goals by team: 367 in 1992–93
- Fewest goals by team: 182 in 1969–70
- Most goals against by team: 394 in 1982–83
- Fewest goals against by team: 188 in 1997–98

=== Players ===
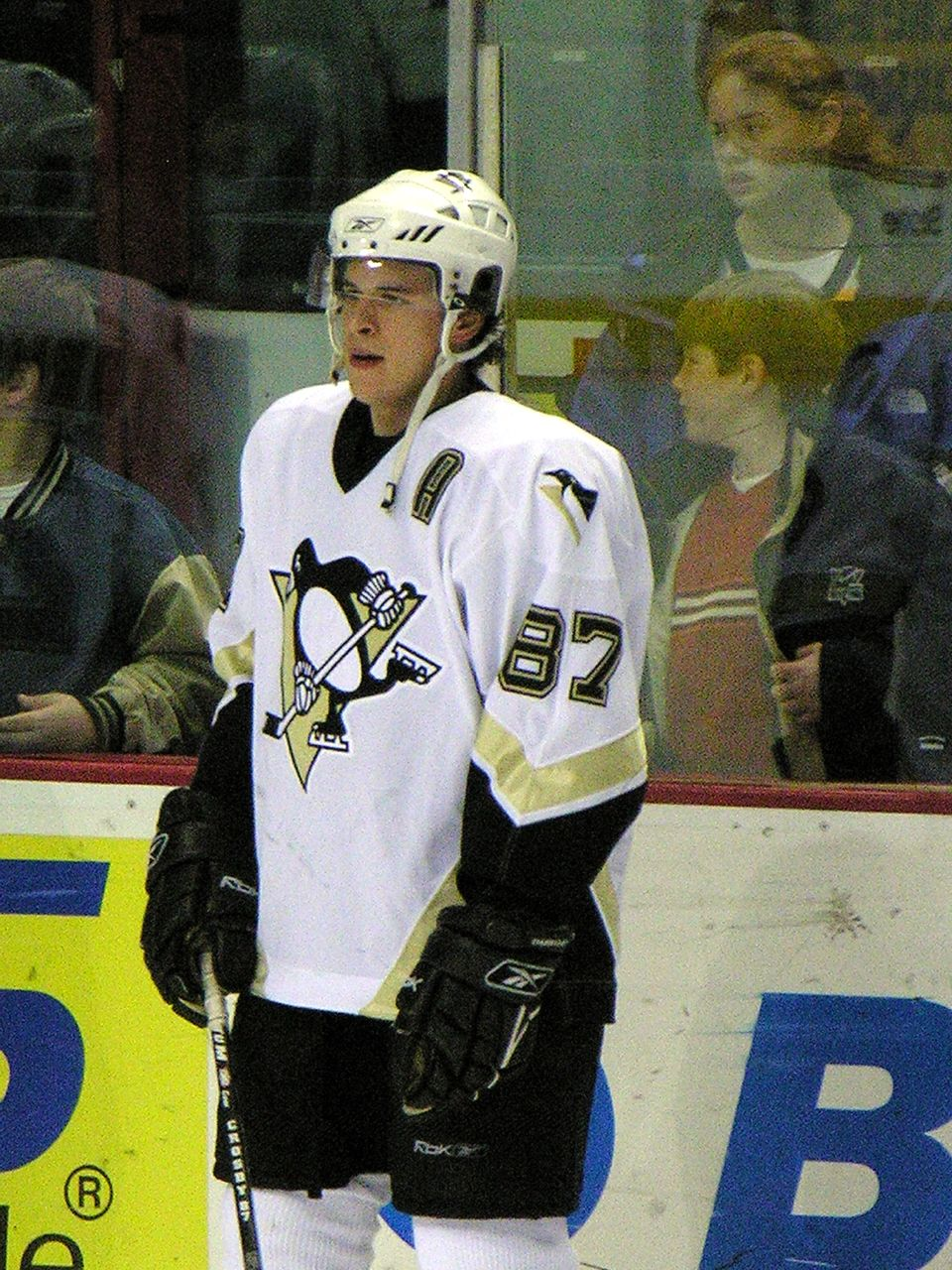
Sidney Crosby set the Penguins record for points by a rookie, scoring 102 in 2005–06

- Most goals: Mario Lemieux, 85 (1988–89)
- Most assists: Mario Lemieux, 114 (1988–89)
- Most points: Mario Lemieux, 199 (1988–89)
- Most PIM: Paul Baxter, 409 (1981–82)
- Most points, defenceman: Paul Coffey, 113 (1988–89)
- Most points, rookie: Sidney Crosby, 102 (2005–06)

=== Goalies ===
- Most games played: Marc-André Fleury, 67 (2006–07, 2009–10, 2011–12)
- Most minutes: Marc-André Fleury, 3,905 (2006–07)
- Most wins: Tom Barrasso, 43 (1992–93)
- Most shutouts: Marc-André Fleury, 10 (2014–15)
- Lowest GAA: Tom Barrasso, 2.07 (1997–98)
- Highest Save %: Ty Conklin, .923 (2007–08); Matt Murray, .923 (2016–17)
