= Ty Conklin =

American ice hockey player (born 1976)

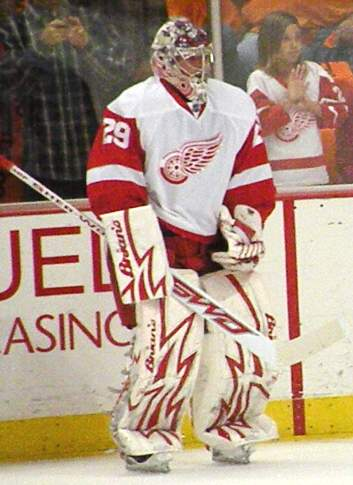
- Conklin with the Detroit Red Wings in 2009
- Born: March 30, 1976 (age 50) Phoenix, Arizona, U.S.
- Height: 6 ft 0 in (183 cm)
- Weight: 184 lb (83 kg; 13 st 2 lb)
- Position: Goaltender
- Caught: Left
- Played for: Edmonton Oilers; Columbus Blue Jackets; Buffalo Sabres; Pittsburgh Penguins; Detroit Red Wings; St. Louis Blues
- National team: United States
- NHL draft: Undrafted
- Playing career: 2001–2012

Ty Curtis Conklin (born March 30, 1976) is an American former professional ice hockey goaltender. Throughout his National Hockey League (NHL) career, he played for the Edmonton Oilers, Columbus Blue Jackets, Buffalo Sabres, Pittsburgh Penguins, St. Louis Blues and two stints with the Detroit Red Wings.

Born in Phoenix, Arizona, Conklin grew up in Anchorage, Alaska, and was an early recruit of the now-famed Minnesota hockey prep school Shattuck-St. Mary's. He later played under Don Granato for the Green Bay Gamblers of the United States Hockey League (USHL) before attending the University of New Hampshire and playing for the Wildcats under long-tenured coach Dick Umile.

A self-described "late-bloomer" and "shorter kid" at age 18, while spending his draft-eligible years (to age 20) remaining off the radar of professional scouts – first as a post-graduate at Shattuck, and then in his first year in Green Bay – Conklin went unclaimed by any team in the NHL's Entry Draft.

Subsequently, he went on to earn numerous goaltending awards and accolades in both the USHL and NCAA, however Conklin claims he never thought of becoming a professional until his junior year (his second playing) at University of New Hampshire.

== Professional career ==
=== Edmonton Oilers (2001–2006) ===
Before making his professional debut, Conklin spent two seasons playing for the Green Bay Gamblers of the United States Hockey League, followed by three seasons playing hockey with the University of New Hampshire's team, the Wildcats (before Conklin could join the Wildcats, he was forced to take a year off because NCAA regulations dictated he do so due to a Division I program transfer). With the completion of his career at the University of New Hampshire in the spring of 2001, Conklin signed a professional contract as an undrafted free agent with the Edmonton Oilers. He spent the bulk of his first two seasons with the Hamilton Bulldogs, the then-shared American Hockey League (AHL) affiliate for the Oilers and Montreal Canadiens, and led the Bulldogs to within one win of a Calder Cup championship in 2003. He set an AHL record for most saves in a game with 83 (in a quadruple overtime, 134:56 minute 2–1 win over the Houston Aeros in Game 2 of the 2003 Calder Cup Final) in what was then the longest game in AHL history. In the 2003–04 season, he played as back-up to Tommy Salo, effectively becoming the starter when Salo was lost to injury, and then as the joint starter with Jussi Markkanen following Salo's trade to the Colorado Avalanche. During the NHL lockout he played for Wolfsburg in the Deutsche Eishockey Liga (DEL), the German elite league.

With the conclusion of the lockout, Conklin entered the new season as Edmonton's probable starting goaltender, backed up by Markkanen. Given the prevalent idea that either goaltender could assume the starting job, local media began using the nickname "Conkkanen" to describe Edmonton's starting goaltender. However, during the 2005–06 season, both goaltenders proved to be inconsistent, with Conklin's performance additionally hampered by injury and no longer considered NHL-caliber, prompting the Oilers to waive Conklin in early February and general manager Kevin Lowe to acquire a new starter, Dwayne Roloson, from the Minnesota Wild at the trade deadline.

==== 2006 Stanley Cup Finals ====
Despite having played one game for the Oilers between March and June, Conklin was on the bench in Game 1 of the 2006 Stanley Cup Finals in Raleigh, against the Carolina Hurricanes. Roloson then suffered what would prove to be a series-ending knee injury late in the third period with the game tied 4–4, and Conklin was suddenly called into play. Edmonton had led by three goals at one point before allowing Carolina to then score four unanswered and take the lead before the Oilers managed to tie the game. With just over 30 seconds of time remaining in regulation, he attempted to play the puck behind the net but gave it away and allowed Hurricanes forward Rod Brind'Amour to score the winning goal unopposed, into an empty net.

It also served as his first and at the time, only, experience in the NHL post-season; Jussi Markkanen played all subsequent six games of the series at head coach Craig MacTavish's discretion; not meant as a punishment or a reflection of Conklin's play, MacTavish explained, but, "...I can't be in a situation that I was in during the course of the year where you are going back between 1 and 1-A, and never give them the opportunity to get confident in the net. If he struggles, he will continue to play. If he plays well, he will continue to play." Canadian national television analyst and former NHL goaltender Kelly Hrudey was less diplomatic than MacTavish: "Not even a question – Markkanen. And I gain no satisfaction in saying that."

"Let's not turn that play into some monumental thing", Conklin said at the time. However, the extraordinarily bad timing and subsequent massive public focus on the indelible miscue did nothing to improve his reputation, already severely diminished by a poor regular season.

"I do really feel horribly for Ty Conklin", Hrudey said. "It's such a traumatic thing that he's gone through and the way in which he let in that goal last night after the season that he's had. It's going to be a real challenge, if you ask me, for him to continue a National Hockey League career. It's going to be tough."

Conklin did not return to the ice again as an Oiler, as the team option on his contract for the 2006–07 NHL season was subsequently declined. "Obviously I needed a change of scenery", he said. "I kicked myself a lot after it happened, but you can't change things, so you just have to deal with it and move on."

=== Columbus Blue Jackets / Buffalo Sabres (2006–2007) ===
Following the start of free agency on July 1, Conklin was signed as an unrestricted free agent (UFA) by the Columbus Blue Jackets, on July 6. He was expected to compete for the Blue Jackets' backup goaltending position, however head coach Gerard Gallant opted to go with internationally experienced Fredrik Norrena. Conklin was subsequently waived and sent to the Jackets' AHL affiliate, the Syracuse Crunch. An injury to Blue Jackets' starter Pascal Leclaire prompted the team to recall him to the NHL on December 11, 2006.

On February 27, 2007, Conklin was acquired by the Buffalo Sabres in a trade for a fifth-round pick in the 2007 NHL entry draft. In his first start with the Sabres, Conklin made a then-career high 42 saves in a win over the Florida Panthers.

=== Pittsburgh Penguins (2007–2008) ===
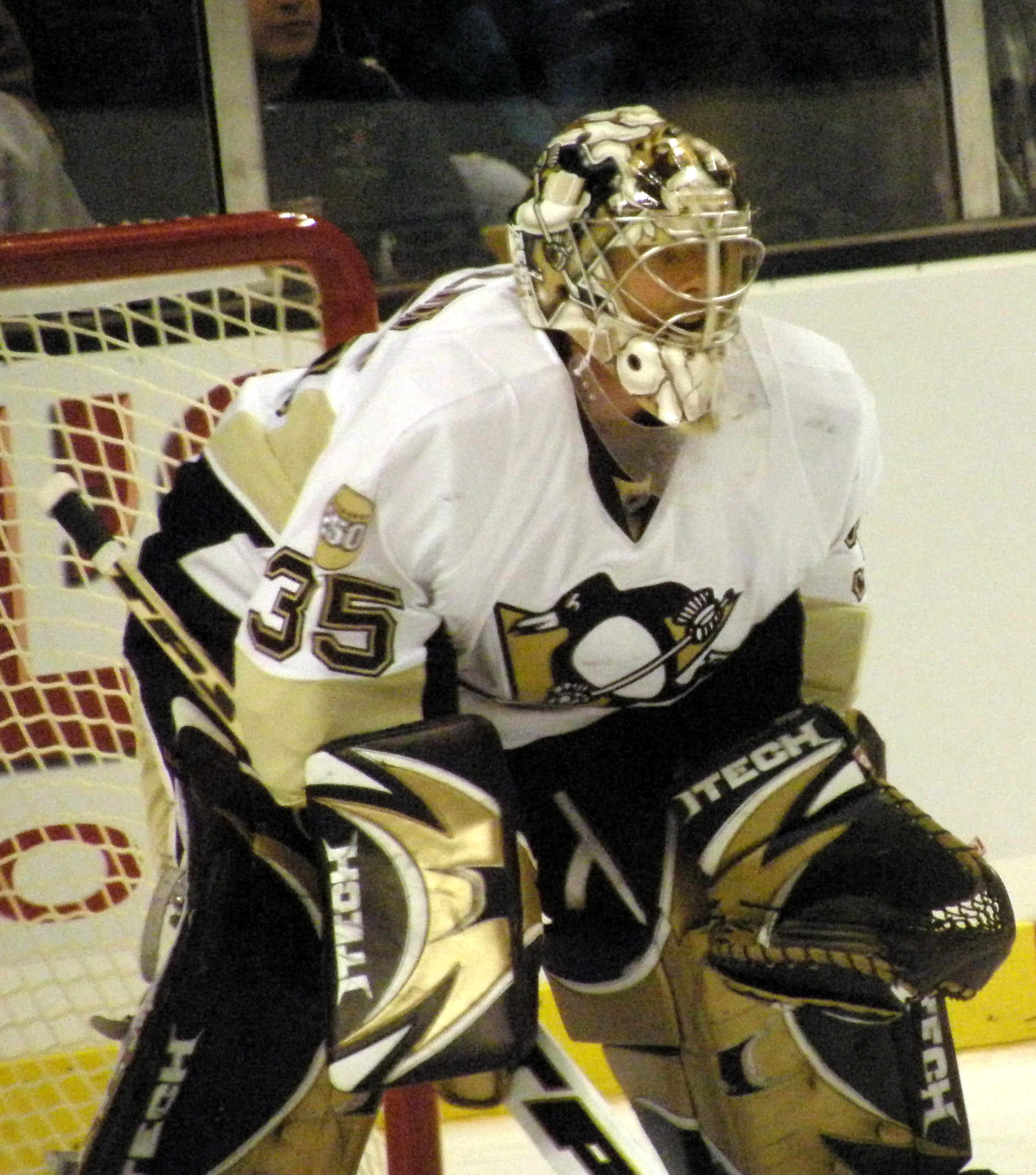
Conklin in his first start with the Penguins, at Boston, 12/20/2007, W 5–4 (SO)

On July 19, 2007, Conklin was signed as a UFA by the Pittsburgh Penguins to a $500,000, one-year, two-way contract (that would pay him $100,000 in the AHL, exempting him from re-entry waivers). After being assigned to Wilkes-Barre/Scranton of the AHL on September 22, he was recalled by Pittsburgh on an emergency basis on December 6, when starting goaltender Marc-André Fleury suffered a high ankle sprain. His first appearance on December 11 in Philadelphia was noted and extremely unprepossessing, as he relieved Dany Sabourin in the third period of an ugly game with the division rival Philadelphia Flyers and promptly earned a 9.00 goals against average (GAA) by allowing the final three goals in an 8–2 blowout loss.

(from ESPN.com Weekly NHL Power Rankings)

...is it really running up the score when Ty Conklin comes in to replace your starting netminder?

Note to Penguins: seek goaltending help.

After winning five of their past six games, including the Winter Classic, the Penguins move up our list. Ty Conklin. Who knew?

Again, we ask, Ty Conklin? Who knew ... really? Seven straight starts, seven straight wins, including two shutouts.

Although initially expected to remain Sabourin's backup, Conklin instead became a sensation as Pittsburgh's de facto starting goaltender, winning his first nine starts from December 20, playing all but one game in the month of January. (Coincidentally, he was the first player to wear #35 for the Penguins since franchise goaltender Tom Barrasso, whose 12-year tenure with the team ended in 2000.)

Before Fleury's return as a starter on March 2, 2008, Conklin compiled a record of 17–6–5, earning the nickname "Conkblock" (derived by keeping a person away from a goal, or preventing someone from scoring) by posting career numbers (such as a 50-save win over the New York Islanders at Nassau Coliseum on February 26, despite being outshot 52–21) and leading the NHL in save percentage.

Despite Conklin's later protests that "[t]he kid has way too much talent, athleticism, and ability to not be a great goalie", and "I had nothing to do with it", Fleury's noticeably improved play upon return was also partially attributed to the competition and mentoring his presence provided, as Penguins goaltending coach Gilles Meloche attested in May,

...he's a good vet; he's a good pro, and you know, he's gonna take just as much credit – if I do take any credit, Ty Conklin's going to take the credit for working with Marc-Andre...in the room, between periods...they communicate really well, and I think Marc-Andre's really taken advantage of that.

Conklin helped the team to not only sustain, but advance their position in the standings during Fleury's extended injury. He was considered by his teammates to have played a role equal to that of Hart Memorial Trophy nominee Evgeni Malkin in the success of the 2007–08 Pittsburgh Penguins season, and was the team's candidate for the Bill Masterton Memorial Trophy, "given annually to the player who best exemplifies the qualities of perseverance, sportsmanship, and dedication to ice hockey.

Conklin played in 33 games for the Penguins, finishing with a personal record of 18–8–5 and a save percentage of .923, second overall in the NHL, and a single-season franchise record. Though he did not play, he served as Fleury's backup in all 20 of the team's playoff games, as Pittsburgh reached the 2008 Stanley Cup Finals, losing to the Detroit Red Wings four games to two.

Due to the existence of the salary cap, the fact Pittsburgh had both Fleury and Sabourin under one-way contracts for 2008–09, and the likelihood of his ability to earn a major increase in both playing time and salary (the 50% raise that eventually came from the Red Wings, who guaranteed him 30 games, was seen as a bargain) with his 2007–08 performance, despite Conklin's significant and memorable contribution to the team, the Penguins did not renew his contract, and decided to allow him to reach unrestricted free agency once more on July 1.

=== Detroit Red Wings (2008–2009) ===
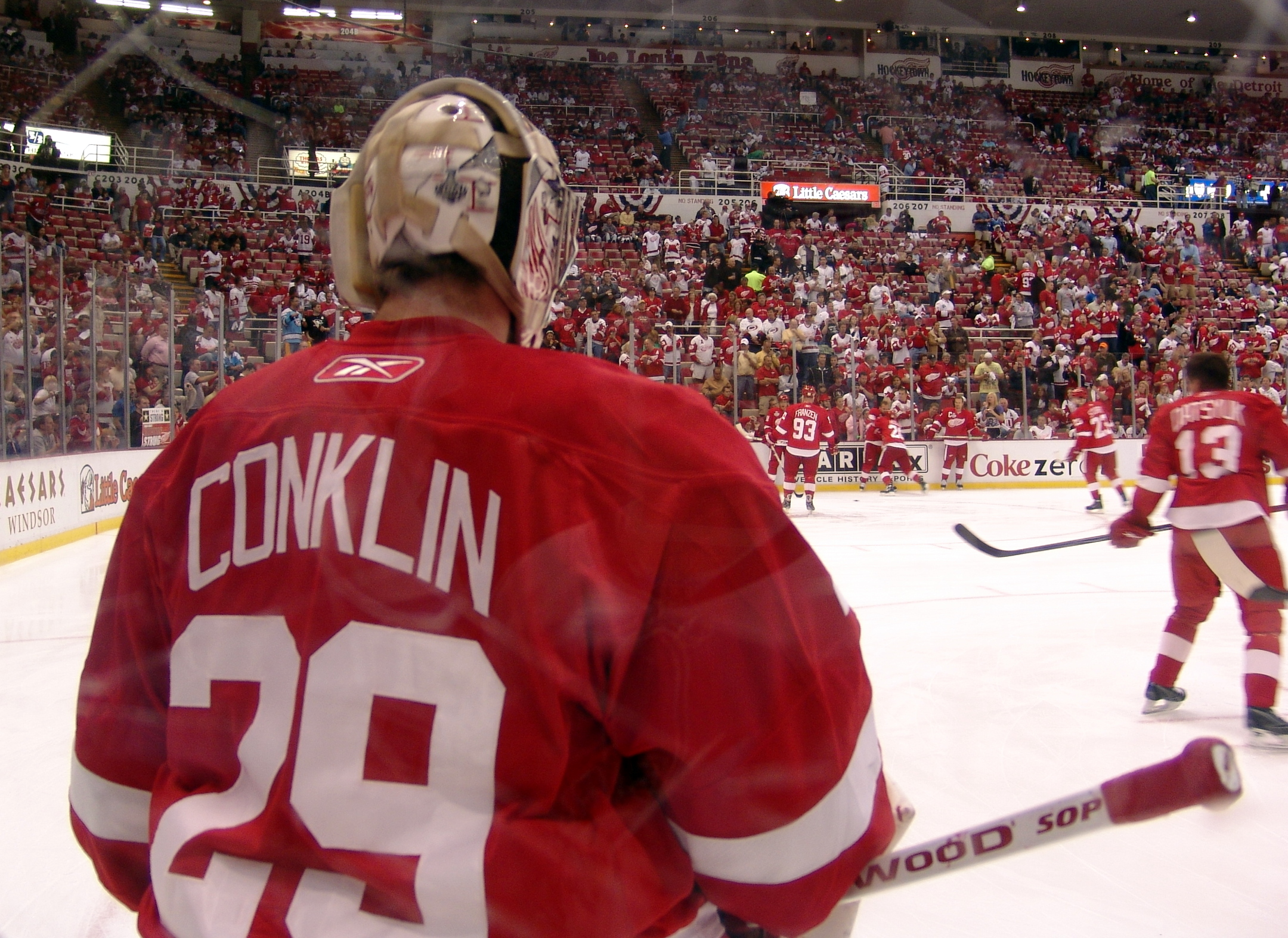
Conklin backing up for the Red Wings, 2009 Stanley Cup Finals Game 5.

On July 1, 2008, Conklin signed a one-year, one-way deal as a UFA with the Detroit Red Wings, worth $750,000. Along with Conklin, former Penguin Marián Hossa also signed a one-year contract with Detroit, joining the team that had just defeated them in the Stanley Cup Finals less than a month earlier. In order to meet his new teammates and familiarize himself, Conklin was one of only six Red Wings to participate in the first optional skate before training camp.

Detroit head coach Mike Babcock expressed a desire to play Conklin in every third game in order to relieve starter Chris Osgood. Conklin made his first start with Detroit on the road, against the Carolina Hurricanes on October 13, where he made 27 saves in a 3–1 Red Wings victory and was named the first star of the game. On November 17, 2008, Conklin made his debut at Detroit's Joe Louis Arena against the Edmonton Oilers, posting his fifth career shutout as the Red Wings won 4–0.

Due to a sub-par regular-season performance from Osgood, Conklin essentially served in an equal-time platoon situation, playing in 40 games and winning 25 to Osgood's 26, his best NHL season, in that regard, to date. Despite significantly outplaying Osgood for the vast majority of the regular season, being credited by his fellow netminder and others for stabilizing the team's goaltending situation, allowing Detroit to capture another Central Division title and the second playoff seed in the Western Conference, Osgood played all but 20 minutes in the playoffs, largely on the strength of his playoff experience.

Conklin received his second taste of NHL playoff experience in Game 4 of the Western Conference Finals against the Chicago Blackhawks, where he substituted for a dehydrated Osgood in the third period and played 20 scoreless minutes. The Red Wings reached the 2009 Stanley Cup Finals, losing a rematch to Conklin's former team, the Pittsburgh Penguins, in seven games.

It was announced in the 2009 off-season Conklin would not be offered a new contract for the 2009–10 season due to salary cap constraints, with the Wings instead opting to promote longtime prospect Jimmy Howard from the AHL.

=== St. Louis Blues (2009–2011) ===
On July 1, 2009, Conklin signed a two-year deal worth an average of US$1.3 million per year with the St. Louis Blues, who made him an immediate offer following the start of free agency at noon.

"It's a young team, a pretty exciting team, an up-and-coming team, and one that played as well as anyone in the second half of the [2008–09] season," Conklin said. "Obviously, financially it's a lot better, a step up from what I've made the last couple years...I know the great season [Blues goaltender Chris] Mason had last year. I don't think they're signing me to play 10 games. Hopefully, I'll challenge for some ice time."

Conklin made his debut with the Blues overseas, on October 3, facing his former team, the Red Wings, at Sweden's Globe Arena, in the second game of the doubleheader of NHL Premiere 2009 Stockholm. After allowing two goals in the first 2:08, he ended with 30 saves on 33 shots as the Blues won 5–3, with his performance publicly contrasted to the widely criticized one of Jimmy Howard, his replacement on Detroit's roster, at the other end.

Conklin's first North American game with the Blues (also his first win and first shutout) came on October 17 away against the Anaheim Ducks, a 5–0 win. Conklin made 26 saves to earn St. Louis's first win since returning from Sweden, the second star of the game, and his 11th career shutout. Conklin did not record any of his ten wins during the 2009–10 NHL season at the Scottrade Center, home of the Blues. On February 26, 2011, Conklin was placed on waivers by St. Louis.

=== Detroit Red Wings (2011–2012) and retirement ===
On July 20, 2011, Conklin signed a one-year contract worth $750,000 to return to the Detroit Red Wings as the backup to Jimmy Howard. Detroit assigned Conklin to its AHL affiliate, the Grand Rapids Griffins, on February 21, 2012. He later re-joined the Red Wings and finished his final season with a 5–6–1 record, combined with a .884 save percentage and 3.28 GAA.

On July 12, 2013, the Blues hired Conklin as their goaltender development coach, effectively signaling his retirement from playing professional hockey.

== International play ==
Medal record

Representing United States

Ice hockey

World Championships
Bronze medal – third place	2004 Czech Republic	

Conklin played for the United States at the IIHF World Championship in the spring of 2004, 2005 and 2011. In the 2004 event, the Americans won a surprising bronze medal. Following an upset of the host Czechs and a shutout, 1–0 shootout victory over Slovakia in the bronze medal game, Conklin was selected as the tournament's best goaltender.

Following the 2011 season, Conklin returned to play for the United States at the 2011 IIHF World Championship in Slovakia, with his best performance coming on May 6 against Canada in a 4–3 shootout loss in the qualifying round. Conklin was named player of the game after making 48 saves. The U.S. reached the tournament's quarter-finals, but lost to the Czech Republic, 4–0.

== Achievements ==
=== NHL outdoor games ===
Conklin participated in each of the first three NHL regular-season games outdoors, the most of any NHL player — even though on each occasion he was not his team's starting goaltender even a month prior to the game. Moreover, he appeared on a different team for each occasion. "I count myself very lucky", he said of the opportunity. "There's not a guy in this league who wouldn't like to play in these games."

- He was the goaltender for the Edmonton Oilers when they lost to the Montreal Canadiens by a score of 4–3, in the Heritage Classic at Edmonton's Commonwealth Stadium, on November 22, 2003.
- He was the goaltender for the Pittsburgh Penguins in their 2–1 shootout victory over the Buffalo Sabres in the AMP Energy NHL Winter Classic at Ralph Wilson Stadium, near Buffalo, on January 1, 2008. He posted a shutout when the Penguins hosted the Sabres two days prior.
- He was in goal for the Detroit Red Wings' 6–4 victory over the Chicago Blackhawks at Chicago's Wrigley Field in the 2009 NHL Winter Classic on New Year's Day. After allowing three goals in the first period, he shut out the Blackhawks for nearly forty minutes, before yielding a goal with ten seconds left in the game. The game was part of a home-and-home series, and Conklin posted a 4–0 shutout when Detroit hosted the Blackhawks two days earlier. Conklin got the start at Wrigley while starter Chris Osgood recovered from a groin injury.

=== Records ===
- Left the University of New Hampshire holding eight goaltending records
- Played and won the longest game in AHL history, May 30–31, 2003 (surpassed by Game 5, East Division Semifinals, Albany vs. Philadelphia, 5OT, April 24–25, 2008)
- Holds the Penguins record for single season save percentage, .923 (2007–08) (surpassed Tom Barrasso, .922 (1997–98))

=== Awards ===
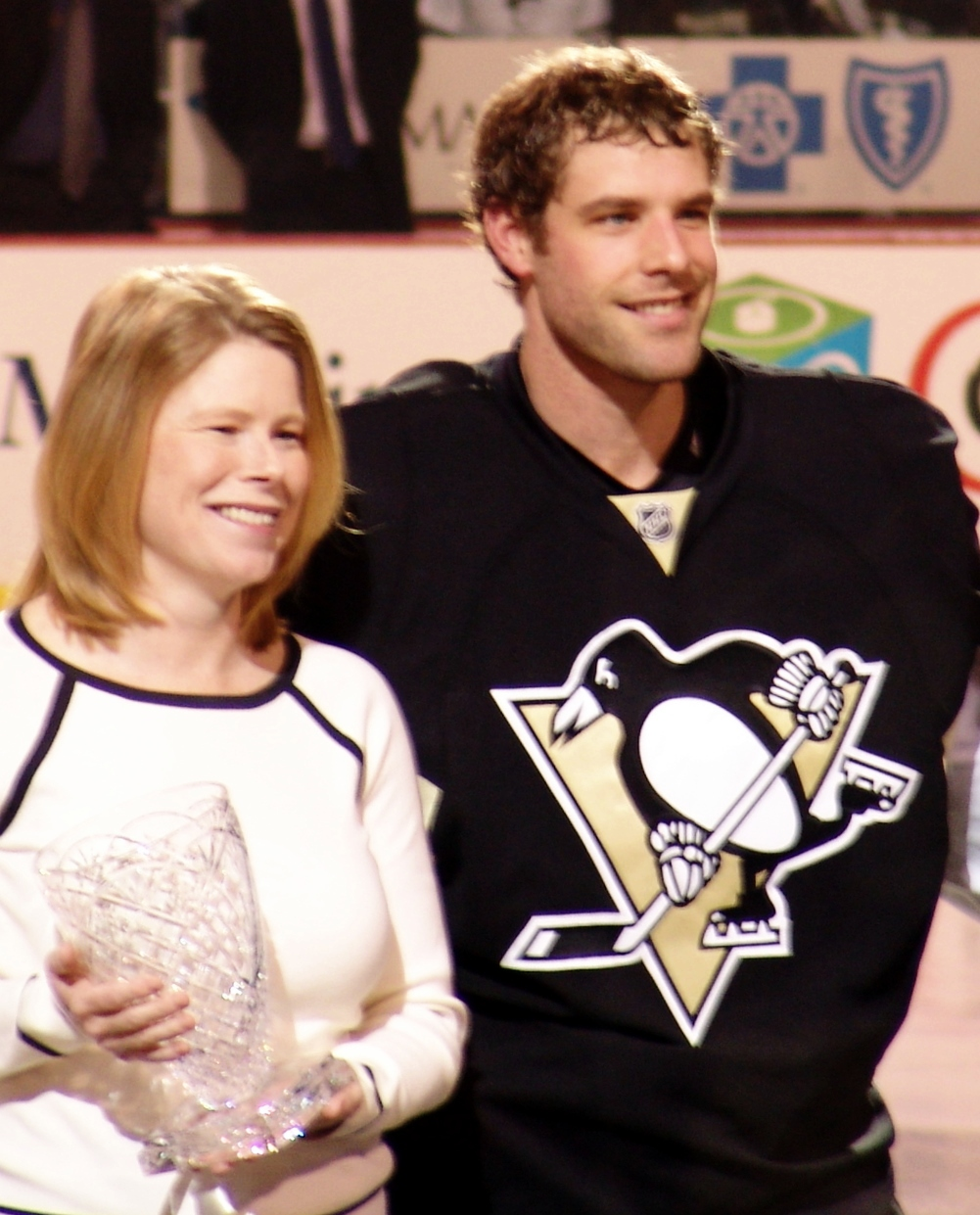
Conklin is honored as the Penguins nominee for the Masterton Trophy during a pregame ceremony in April 2008.

- Nominee for the Masterton Trophy, Pittsburgh Penguins, 2008
- Top ten finalist for the Hobey Baker Award (best male ice hockey player, U.S. college hockey) 2000, 2001
- Co-winner of the Walter Brown Award (with Brian Gionta) (New England's outstanding American-born college player), 2001
- Hockey East Goaltending Leader Award (lowest goals against average), 2001
- Co-winner, Hockey East Player of the Year (with Mike Mottau), 2000

=== Honors ===
Award	Year
All-Hockey East Rookie Team	1998–99
All-Hockey East Second Team	1998–99
All-Hockey East First Team	1999–00
AHCA East Second-Team All-American	1999–00
All-Hockey East First Team	2000–01
AHCA East First-Team All-American	2000–01

- Best goaltender, 2004 Men's World Ice Hockey Championships (Directorate Award)
- Named captain of the UNH Wildcats, October 5, 2000
- Elected by his teammates, he was the first goaltender to captain the Wildcats since 1961
- Two-time regular-season champion (Anderson Cup), USHL, 1996, 1997
- USHL playoff championship (Clark Cup), 1996
- USHL First All-Star Team, 1996

== Personal ==
Conklin is the son of Robert and Beth Conklin. Although his Phoenix birth possibly makes him the first Arizona-born ice hockey player to play regularly in the NHL, Conklin spent his entire childhood in Alaska, attending West Anchorage High School and playing for the Anchorage Hockey Association North Stars until he was recruited by Shattuck-St. Mary's, a boarding school in Faribault, Minnesota. He is the first Alaskan goaltender to reach the NHL. His younger brother Brice used him for shooting practice in their basement (a reversal of the usual positions for siblings) and went on to play defense for Shattuck and for Harvard University. His brother Sid also played at Shattuck as a goaltender.

Conklin is married with three children. The family resides in central Maine during the off-season.

== Career statistics ==
=== Regular season and playoffs ===
			Regular season										Playoffs
Season	Team	League	GP	W	L	T	OTL	MIN	GA	SO	GAA	SV%	GP	W	L	MIN	GA	SO	GAA	SV%
1992–93	Shattuck–Saint Mary's	HS–Prep	—	—	—	—	—	—	—	—	—	—	—	—	—	—	—	—	—	—
1993–94	Shattuck–Saint Mary's	HS–Prep	—	—	—	—	—	—	—	—	—	—	—	—	—	—	—	—	—	—
1995–96	Green Bay Gamblers	USHL	30	—	—	—	—	1,727	82	1	2.85	—	—	—	—	—	—	—	—	—
1996–97	Green Bay Gamblers	USHL	30	19	7	1	—	1,609	86	1	3.21	.908	17	8	9	980	56	1	3.43	.913
1998–99	University of New Hampshire	HE	22	18	3	1	—	1,338	41	0	1.84	.923	—	—	—	—	—	—	—	—
1999–00	University of New Hampshire	HE	37	22	8	6	—	2,194	91	2	2.49	.908	—	—	—	—	—	—	—	—
2000–01	University of New Hampshire	HE	34	17	12	5	—	2,048	70	5	2.05	.920	—	—	—	—	—	—	—	—
2001–02	Edmonton Oilers	NHL	4	2	0	0	—	148	4	0	1.62	.939	—	—	—	—	—	—	—	—
2001–02	Hamilton Bulldogs	AHL	37	13	12	8	—	2,043	89	1	2.61	.916	7	4	2	416	18	0	2.60	.917
2002–03	Hamilton Bulldogs	AHL	38	19	13	3	—	2,140	91	4	2.55	.914	17	9	6	1,024	38	1	2.23	.933
2003–04	Edmonton Oilers	NHL	38	17	14	4	—	2,086	84	1	2.42	.912	—	—	—	—	—	—	—	—
2004–05	EHC Wolfsburg Grizzly Adams	DEL	11	—	—	—	—	623	31	0	2.99	.920	7	—	—	414	11	2	1.59	.946
2005–06	Edmonton Oilers	NHL	18	8	5	—	1	922	43	1	2.80	.880	1	0	1	6	1	0	10.00	.667
2005–06	Hamilton Bulldogs	AHL	3	1	2	—	0	152	8	0	3.17	.907	—	—	—	—	—	—	—	—
2005–06	Hartford Wolf Pack	AHL	2	1	0	—	1	130	5	0	2.31	.932	—	—	—	—	—	—	—	—
2006–07	Syracuse Crunch	AHL	19	3	12	—	3	1,085	60	0	3.32	.902	—	—	—	—	—	—	—	—
2006–07	Columbus Blue Jackets	NHL	11	2	3	—	2	491	27	0	3.30	.871	—	—	—	—	—	—	—	—
2006–07	Buffalo Sabres	NHL	5	1	2	—	0	227	13	0	3.44	.892	—	—	—	—	—	—	—	—
2007–08	Wilkes–Barre/Scranton Penguins	AHL	18	11	7	—	0	1,058	39	2	2.21	.919	—	—	—	—	—	—	—	—
2007–08	Pittsburgh Penguins	NHL	33	18	8	—	5	1,866	78	2	2.51	.923	—	—	—	—	—	—	—	—
2008–09	Detroit Red Wings	NHL	40	25	11	—	2	2,246	94	6	2.51	.909	1	0	0	20	0	0	0.00	1.000
2009–10	St. Louis Blues	NHL	26	10	10	—	2	1,451	60	4	2.48	.921	—	—	—	—	—	—	—	—
2010–11	St. Louis Blues	NHL	25	8	8	—	4	1,285	69	2	3.22	.881	—	—	—	—	—	—	—	—
2011–12	Detroit Red Wings	NHL	15	5	6	—	1	805	44	1	3.28	.884	—	—	—	—	—	—	—	—
2011–12	Grand Rapids Griffins	AHL	12	8	4	—	0	725	29	0	2.40	.915	—	—	—	—	—	—	—	—
NHL totals			215	96	67	4	19	11,527	516	17	2.69	.906	2	0	1	26	1	0	2.31	.917

=== International ===
Year	Team	Event	GP	W	L	T	MIN	GA	SO	GAA	SV%
2004	United States	WC	5	4	0	1	280	10	1	2.14	.934
2004	United States	WCH	DNP	—	—	—	—	—	—	—	—
2005	United States	WC	3	1	0	2	180	6	0	2.00	.885
2011	United States	WC	4	1	3	–	216	14	0	3.89	.892
Senior totals			12	6	3	3	676	30	1	2.66	.912

Awards and achievements
Preceded by Jason Krog	Hockey East Player of the Year; 1999–00 With Mike Mottau	Succeeded by Brian Gionta
Preceded by Michel Larocque; Scott Clemmensen	Hockey East Goaltending Champion; 1998–99; 2000–01	Succeeded by Scott Clemmensen; Mike Ayers
