= Marc-André Fleury =

Canadian ice hockey player (born 1984)

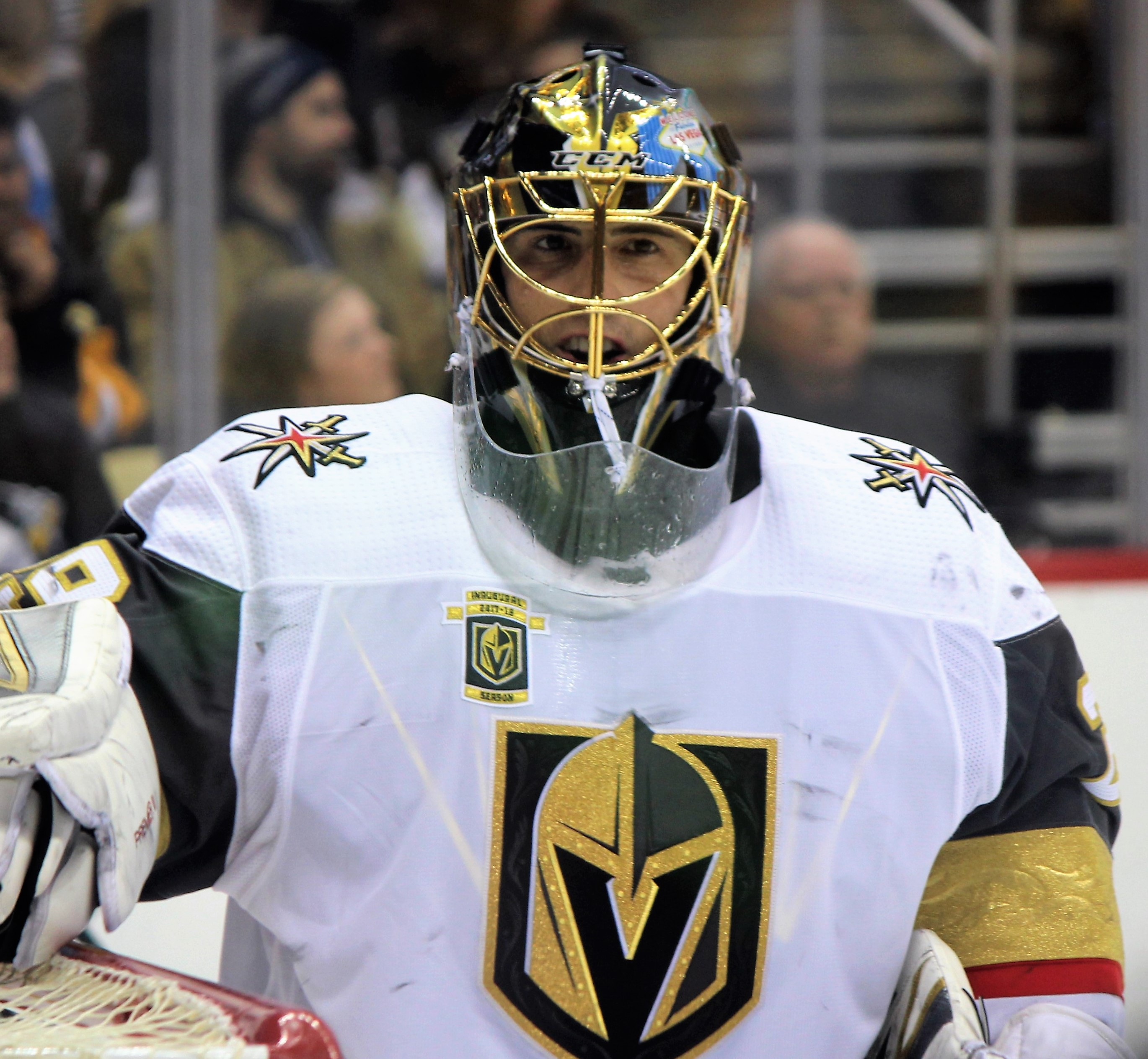
- Fleury with the Vegas Golden Knights in 2018
- Born: November 28, 1984 (age 41) Sorel-Tracy, Quebec, Canada
- Height: 6 ft 2 in (188 cm)
- Weight: 185 lb (84 kg; 13 st 3 lb)
- Position: Goaltender
- Caught: Left
- Played for: Pittsburgh Penguins; Vegas Golden Knights; Chicago Blackhawks; Minnesota Wild
- National team: Canada
- NHL draft: 1st overall, 2003; Pittsburgh Penguins
- Playing career: 2003–2025

Marc-André Fleury (Note: French pronunciation: [maʁk ɑ̃dʁe flœʁi]) (born November 28, 1984) is a Canadian former professional hockey goaltender. Drafted out of the Quebec Major Junior Hockey League (QMJHL) first overall by the Pittsburgh Penguins in the 2003 NHL entry draft, Fleury played major junior for four seasons with the Cape Breton Screaming Eagles. He joined the Penguins in 2003–04. During his 13 seasons with the team, Fleury won Stanley Cup championships in 2009, 2016, and 2017; once as a starter and twice as a backup. He is considered to be one of the greatest goaltenders of all time.

After being selected by the Vegas Golden Knights in the 2017 NHL expansion draft, Fleury reached the Final again in 2018, and received the William M. Jennings Trophy and the Vezina Trophy in 2021. Fleury also played with the Chicago Blackhawks, as well as the Minnesota Wild, with whom he reached several milestones and ultimately retired with in 2025. He is the third goaltender to ever reach the 500 victories mark in the NHL, after Patrick Roy and Martin Brodeur, and the fourth goaltender to reach 1,000 games played, after Roy, Brodeur, and Roberto Luongo.

Internationally, Fleury has represented Canada's junior team twice, winning back-to-back silver medals at the World Junior Championships in 2003 and 2004. He won a gold medal with the Canada senior team at the 2010 Winter Olympics. Fleury is known by the nickname "Flower", derived from the English translation of his last name (fleuri means "in bloom", or "in flower", in French).

== Playing career ==
As a youth, Fleury played in the 1998 Quebec International Pee-Wee Hockey Tournament with the College-Français Rive-Sud minor ice hockey team from South Shore, Montreal.

Fleury played junior ice hockey in the Quebec Major Junior Hockey League for the Cape Breton Screaming Eagles beginning in 2000–01. After a strong 2002–03 campaign that included a silver medal with Canada's junior team at the World Junior Championships, QMJHL Second Team All-Star honours, the Mike Bossy Trophy as the league's top prospect and the Telus Cup as the top defensive player, he was chosen first overall in the 2003 NHL entry draft by the Pittsburgh Penguins. The Penguins acquired the first overall pick from the Florida Panthers in a trade that sent the first and 73rd overall picks to the Penguins in exchange for Mikael Samuelsson and the third and 55th picks. He is only the third goalie to be chosen first overall in the NHL entry draft, after Michel Plasse and Rick DiPietro. Playing four seasons total with Cape Breton, Fleury's jersey number (29) was later retired by the club in his fourth NHL season on January 25, 2008.

=== Pittsburgh Penguins (2003–2017) ===
Fleury immediately made his NHL debut during the 2003–04 season as the youngest goaltender in the league at 18 years old (three years younger than the second-youngest, Rick DiPietro of the New York Islanders). He appeared in his first NHL game on October 10, 2003, against the Los Angeles Kings, recording an impressive 46-save performance, which included a penalty shot save, in a 3–0 loss. Fleury recorded his first NHL win in his very next start, on October 18, with 31 saves in a 4–3 win over the Detroit Red Wings. His first NHL shutout came on October 30, in a 1–0 victory over the Chicago Blackhawks. Fleury shared time with goaltenders Jean-Sébastien Aubin and Sébastien Caron and lived up to first-overall-pick expectations early, earning Rookie of the Month honours in October, with a 2–2–2 record, 1.96 goals against average (GAA) and .943 save percentage. As the season progressed, however, his performance began to sink, mainly due to Pittsburgh's poor defence. He was loaned to Canada's junior team for the 2004 World Junior Championships and, upon returning with a second consecutive silver medal, he was sent back to the QMJHL on January 29, 2004. In light of financial difficulties for the franchise, it is believed Fleury's $3 million contract bonus, which he would have potentially received if he stayed and met several performance goals, was a factor in the decision to return him to Cape Breton. To no avail, Fleury offered to forfeit his bonus to remain with the club. Fleury finished the QMJHL season with Cape Breton in a first round elimination and was subsequently assigned to Pittsburgh's American Hockey League (AHL) affiliate, the Wilkes-Barre/Scranton Penguins, and appeared in two postseason games.

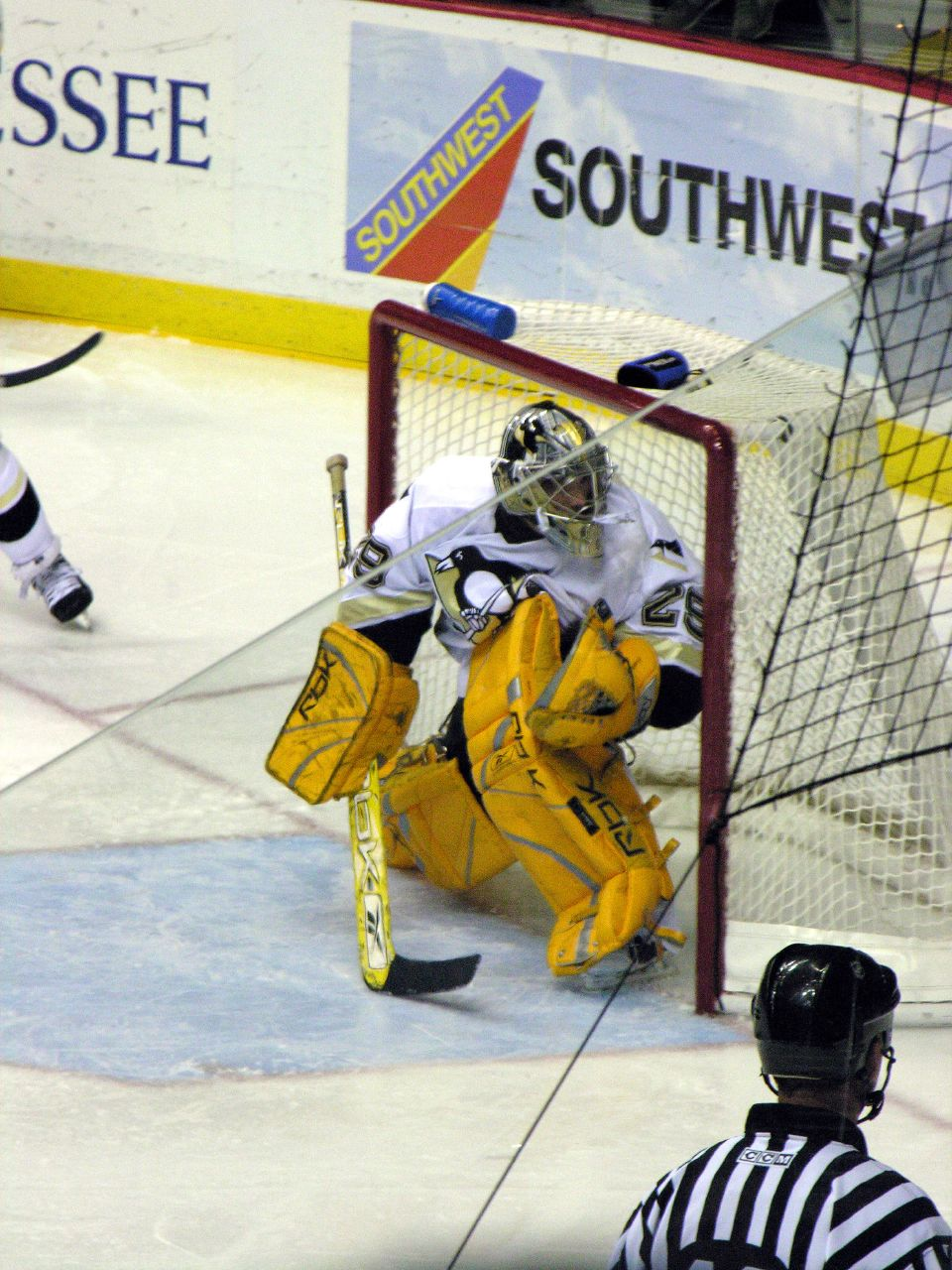
Fleury in net in January 2006

As NHL play was postponed due to the labour dispute, Fleury continued to play with Wilkes-Barre/Scranton in the 2004–05 AHL season, where he posted a 26–19–4 record, a 2.52 goals against average and a .901 save percentage. When NHL play resumed in 2005–06, Fleury started the season once more in the minors, but was quickly called up by Pittsburgh for a game against the Buffalo Sabres on October 10, to replace an injured Jocelyn Thibault. He continued to play between Wilkes-Barre/Scranton and Pittsburgh until November 28, after which he remained with Pittsburgh. With the Penguins finishing last in the Eastern Conference and allowing a league-worst 316 goals, Fleury recorded a 3.25 goals against average and a .898 save percentage. Competing for time with Sébastien Caron and Jocelyn Thibault, Fleury emerged as the Penguins' starting goalie.

Despite playing behind a shaky defence, Fleury was able to impress the team management with his technique and performance and signed a two-year contract extension worth $2.59 million in the off-season. In the proceeding campaign, Fleury's stats had improved significantly. Playing behind a better Penguins team, which featured rising superstars Sidney Crosby and Evgeni Malkin, he recorded five shutouts and a 2.83 goals against average. He earned his 40th win in a 2–1 victory over the New York Rangers in the season finale, joining Tom Barrasso as the only Penguins goaltenders to record 40 wins in a season. He also broke Johan Hedberg's single season franchise record for most games and minutes played. Fleury made his NHL playoff debut against the Ottawa Senators, the eventual Stanley Cup finalists, in the first round and recorded his first playoff win in game two, recording 34 saves in a 4–3 win at Scotiabank Place. The team was ultimately eliminated by the Senators in five games.

Early on in the 2007–08 season, Fleury posted a 9–8–1 record, a 2.90 goals-against average and a .902 save percentage, where won four straight games before suffering a high-ankle sprain against the Calgary Flames on December 6. He returned as a starter on March 2, after a brief conditioning stint in the AHL with Wilkes-Barre/Scranton. While sidelined, he decided to change the colour of his goaltending equipment from the bright yellow that had become his signature to plain white, to gain an optical advantage over shooters. He was also influenced and challenged by the very strong play of Ty Conklin, who took the team's starting job after being promoted from Wilkes-Barre/Scranton in Fleury's absence. Upon his return from injury, Fleury helped the Penguins win the Atlantic Division, going 10–2–1 with a 1.45 goals against average en route to a 12–2 playoff run to the 2008 Stanley Cup Final against the Detroit Red Wings. In game five of the Final at Detroit, he stopped 55 of 58 shots in a triple overtime win for the Penguins to stave off elimination. The Penguins lost the series in six games. Fleury's attempt to cover an unseen loose puck by sitting on it in game six resulted in him propelling the puck into the net; the own goal turned out to be the Stanley Cup-winner, credited to Henrik Zetterberg. At the start of the following season, he said:

"I'm done with it. I swore enough about it. Nothing I can do anymore. I don't think we lost the finals on one goal, you know what I mean? I feel bad because I kind of put it in, but it was a best-out-of-seven. They had a good team, and they beat us."

Fleury completed the playoffs with three shutouts – a new team record for one playoff season – and a 14–6 record. He also recorded a .933 save percentage through 20 games in the playoffs. In the off-season, Fleury signed a seven-year, US$35 million contract with the Penguins, on July 3. It included a no-movement clause, and a limited no-trade clause that triggered in the 2010–11 season.

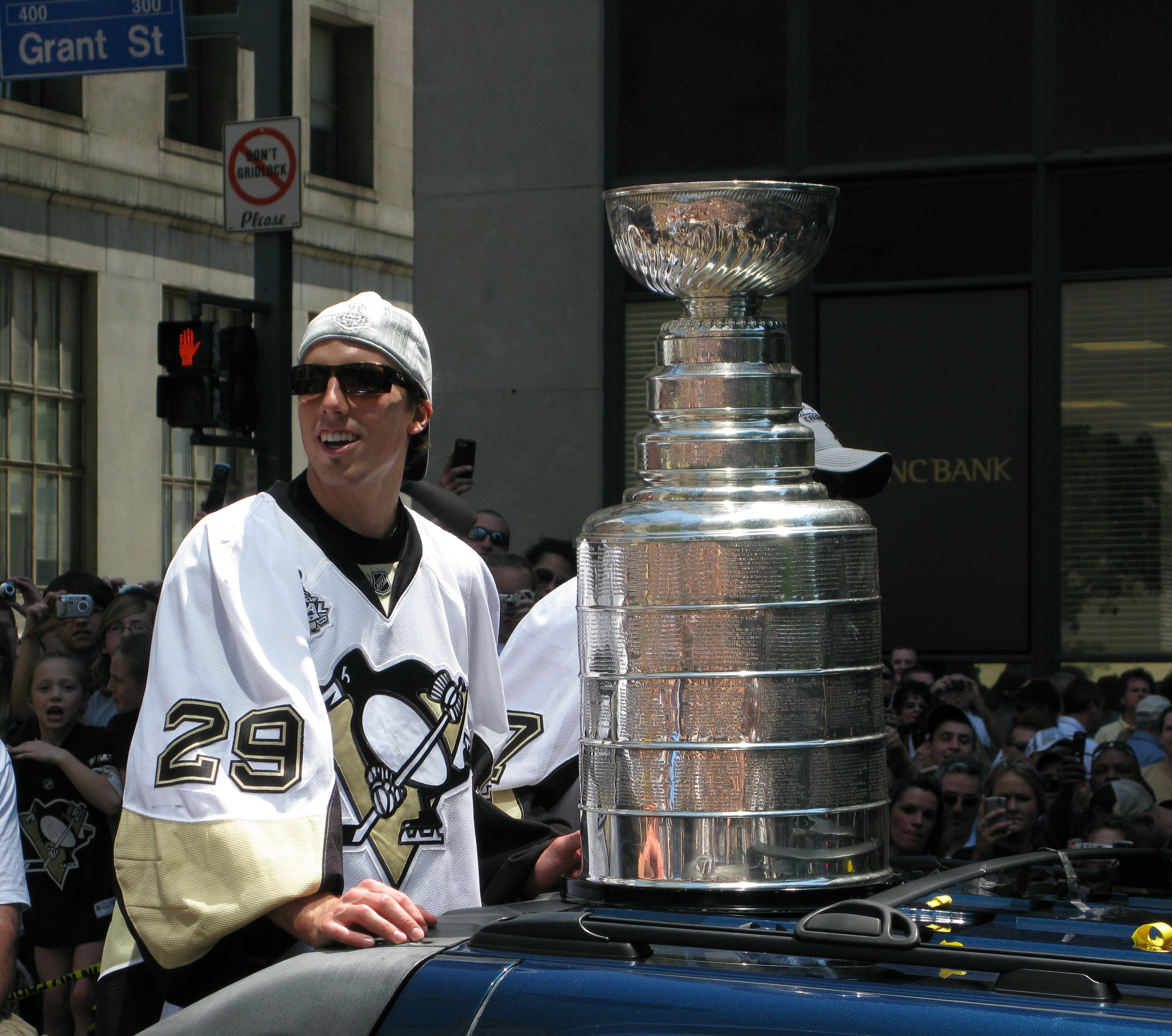
Fleury with the Stanley Cup at the Pittsburgh Penguins' Stanley Cup parade on June 15, 2009

Fleury compiled a 35–18–7 record in the 2008–09 season to help the Penguins to a fourth-place finish in the Eastern Conference, entering the 2009 playoffs as the defending Prince of Wales champions. Fleury was a major factor in the first round against the Penguins' intrastate rivals the Philadelphia Flyers. In game two at home, with a 2–1 deficit late in the third, Fleury made a key toe save against Flyers top goal scorer Jeff Carter, which was eventually pivotal as the Penguins tied the game late in the 3rd and won late in overtime. After the Flyers won game three comfortably, Fleury once again stole a game for the Penguins in game four, stopping 43 shots to keep a surging Flyers line-up at bay and ensure a 3–1 lead. The Flyers won in Pittsburgh in game five, but Fleury saved another performance for the final period of game six. After initially letting in 3 goals, Fleury did not allow another as the Penguins rallied from a 3–0 deficit to win 5–3. The Penguins went the full distance in the second round against the Washington Capitals. In the deciding game seven, Fleury made a key breakaway glove save early in the contest against Capitals superstar Alexander Ovechkin, helping the Penguins eliminate Washington by a 6–2 score. Fleury and the Penguins then swept the Carolina Hurricanes in the conference finals to return to the Stanley Cup Final against the Detroit Red Wings for the second consecutive year. After being pulled in game five after allowing five goals, Fleury made another momentous breakaway save in game six, this time with 1:39 minutes left in regulation against Dan Cleary to preserve a 2–1 lead and help the Penguins force a game seven. Playing the series-deciding game in Detroit, Fleury played an integral role in the Penguins 2–1 victory to capture the franchise's third Stanley Cup, making two critical saves in the final seconds. After stopping an initial Henrik Zetterberg shot from the right faceoff circle, the rebound came loose to Nicklas Lidström at the left faceoff circle, forcing Fleury to make a diving stop with 1.5 seconds remaining to preserve the win and the Stanley Cup.

Fleury recorded a 37–21–6 record during the 2009–10 season, with Pittsburgh again finishing fourth in the Eastern Conference. After eliminating Ottawa in six games, the Penguins were upset by the eighth-seeded Montreal Canadiens in round two, ending their chance of a Stanley Cup repeat, with game seven marking the last game at the Mellon Arena. Fleury recorded a 2.78 goals against average during the Playoffs.

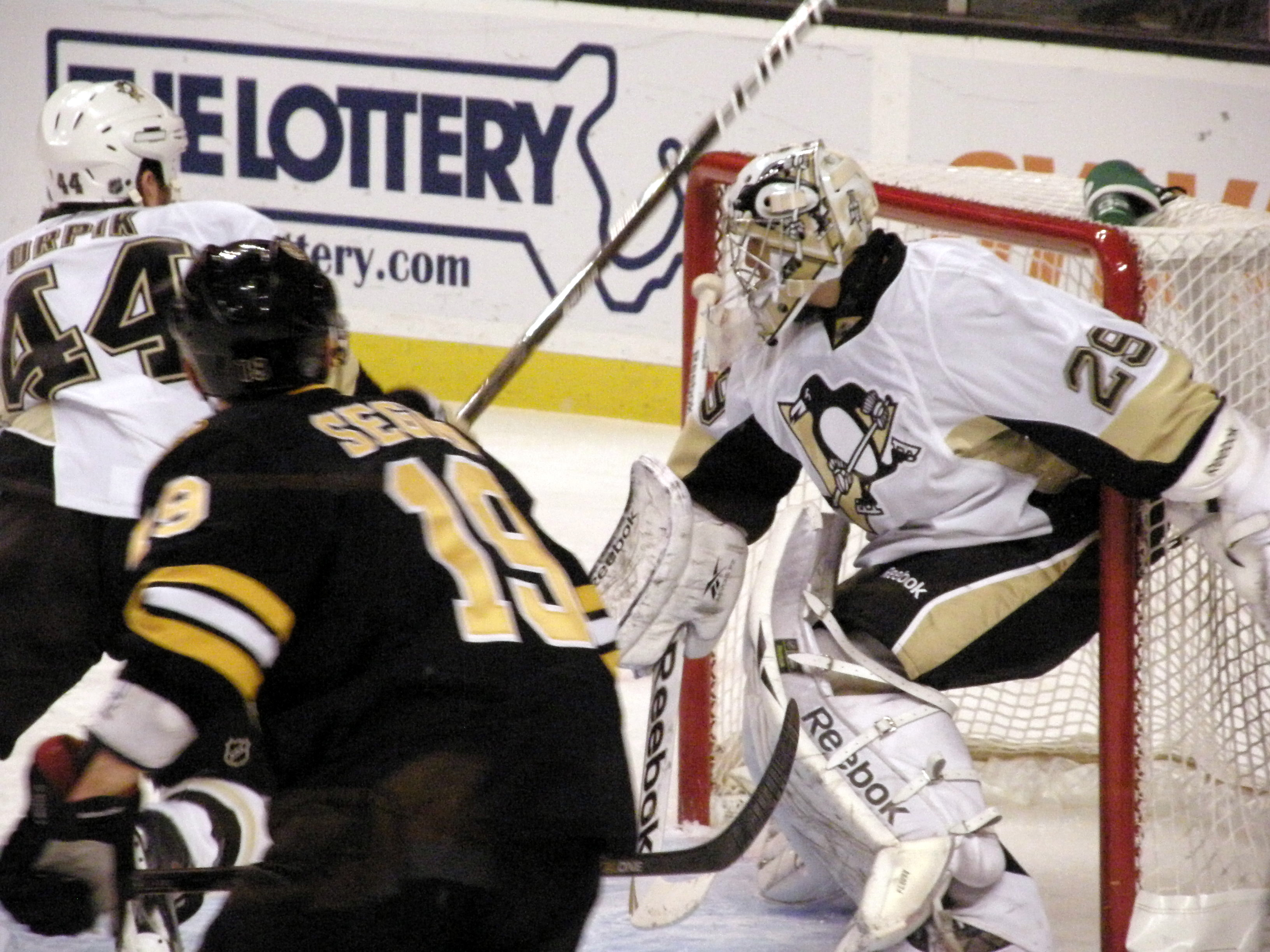
Fleury standing in net against Tyler Seguin, while teammate Brooks Orpik defends during a January 2011 game

With Sidney Crosby and Evgeni Malkin sidelined with injuries for much of the 2010–11 season, Fleury and the Penguins' defence were relied on to carry the team to the playoffs. Fleury finished with a 36–20–5 record, and the Penguins finished fourth in the Eastern Conference. The Penguins squared off against the Tampa Bay Lightning in the first round of the playoffs, where they were defeated in seven games despite taking a 3–1 series lead early. Fleury posted a .899 save percentage in the series.

Backup goalies Brent Johnson and Brad Thiessen struggled through much of the 2011–12 season, leaving Fleury as the only viable goaltending option. Fleury played 67 games in the season, starting 23 consecutive games at one point leading up to the All-Star break, and finished the season with 42 wins, second only to the Nashville Predators' Pekka Rinne. Despite the impressive regular season campaign, Fleury had a less-than-impressive playoff run, being eliminated by the Philadelphia Flyers in the first round and posting a .834 save percentage and 4.63 goals against average, as the Flyers advanced in six games.

Fleury returned to the net after the lockout season, finishing with a record of 23–8, tying him for fourth in the league. His save percentage and goals against average continued to place him in the top half of starting goaltenders. His playoff troubles continued, however; after posting a shutout in his playoff game, he was less than impressive in following starts, leaving backup Tomáš Vokoun to start for the remainder of the 2013 playoffs. The Penguins promising 2012–13 season ended abruptly with a 4–0 loss to the Boston Bruins in the Eastern Conference finals. After the season, however, Penguins officials confirmed that Fleury remained the team's starting goaltender.

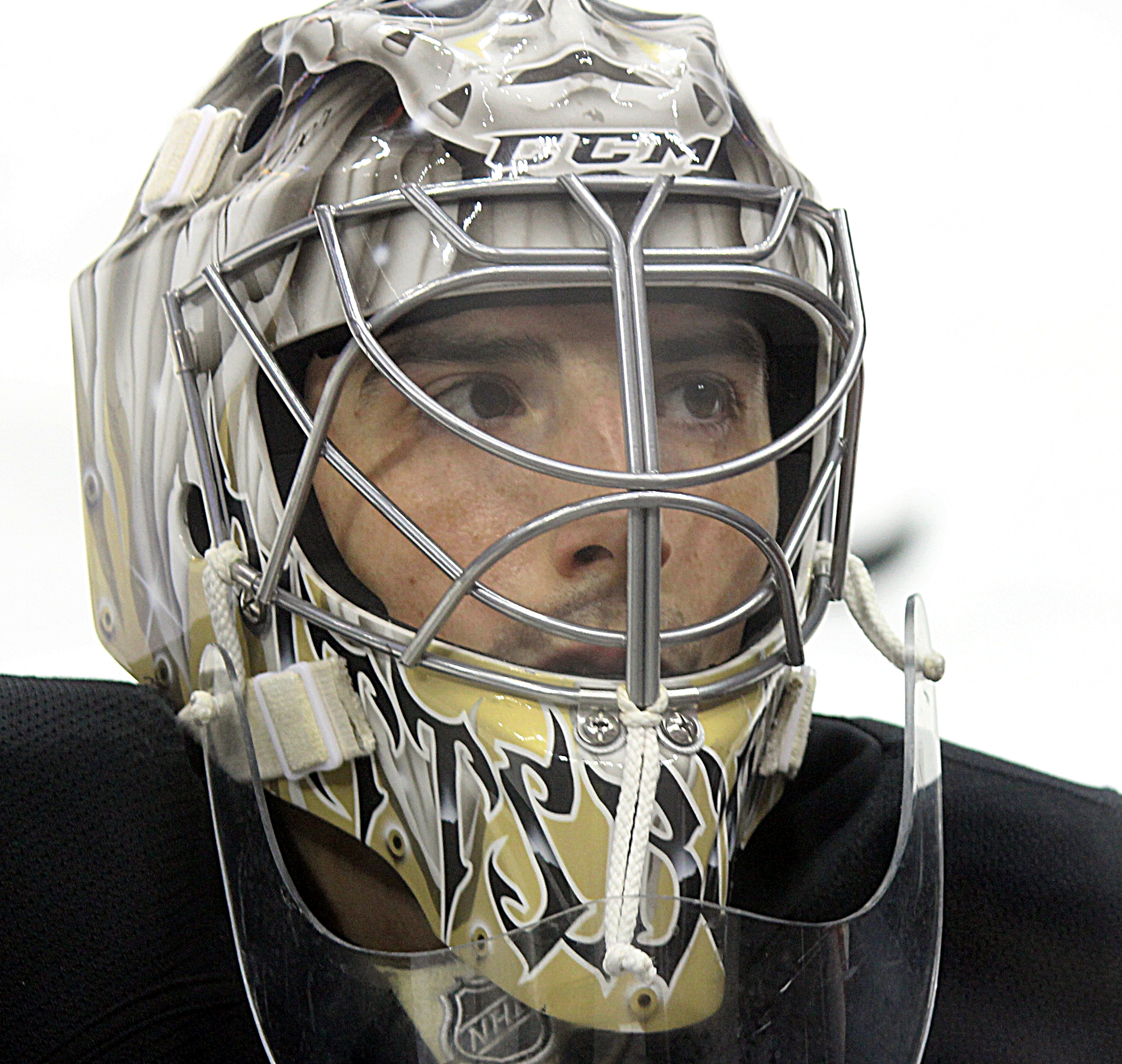
Fleury in December 2014

Fleury's performance during the 2013–14 regular season was similar to his performance the year before, finishing with a record of 39–18–5 and posted a save percentage of .915 and a goals against average of 2.37; he posted a save percentage of .916 and a goals against average of 2.39, the year prior. Despite a marked improvement in his playoff performance over the prior year, the Penguins lost in the second round to the New York Rangers despite taking an early 3–1 lead in the series.

On November 5, 2014, the Penguins signed Fleury to a four-year extension with an average annual value of $5.75 million. On November 18, 2014, he earned his first shutout against the Montreal Canadiens, making 27 saves for a league-leading fourth shutout of the season, with a final score of 4–0. On November 24, 2014, Fleury recorded his 300th NHL win, becoming the third-youngest and third-fastest player to reach the milestone. On April 11, Fleury recorded his league leading tenth shutout in a 2–0 victory against the Buffalo Sabres to secure the last wild card spot in the East.

In the 2015–16 season, the team struggled through the first half, resulting in the firing of head coach Mike Johnston and the hiring of new coach Mike Sullivan. Fleury played a great second half of the season before suffering a season ending concussion. He finished the season with an impressive 35 wins in 58 games played. The team made a final push with up-and-comer Matt Murray in goal and qualified for the playoffs. Despite the Penguins qualifying for the 2016 Stanley Cup playoffs, Fleury was unable to play due to post-concussion syndrome until game four of the Eastern Conference finals against the Tampa Bay Lightning where he subbed in for Murray at the start of the third period. Fleury then started game five, which the Penguins lost 4–3 in overtime. Fleury was then benched in favour of Murray. The Penguins would go on to win the Stanley Cup with Murray in goal, defeating the San Jose Sharks in six games.

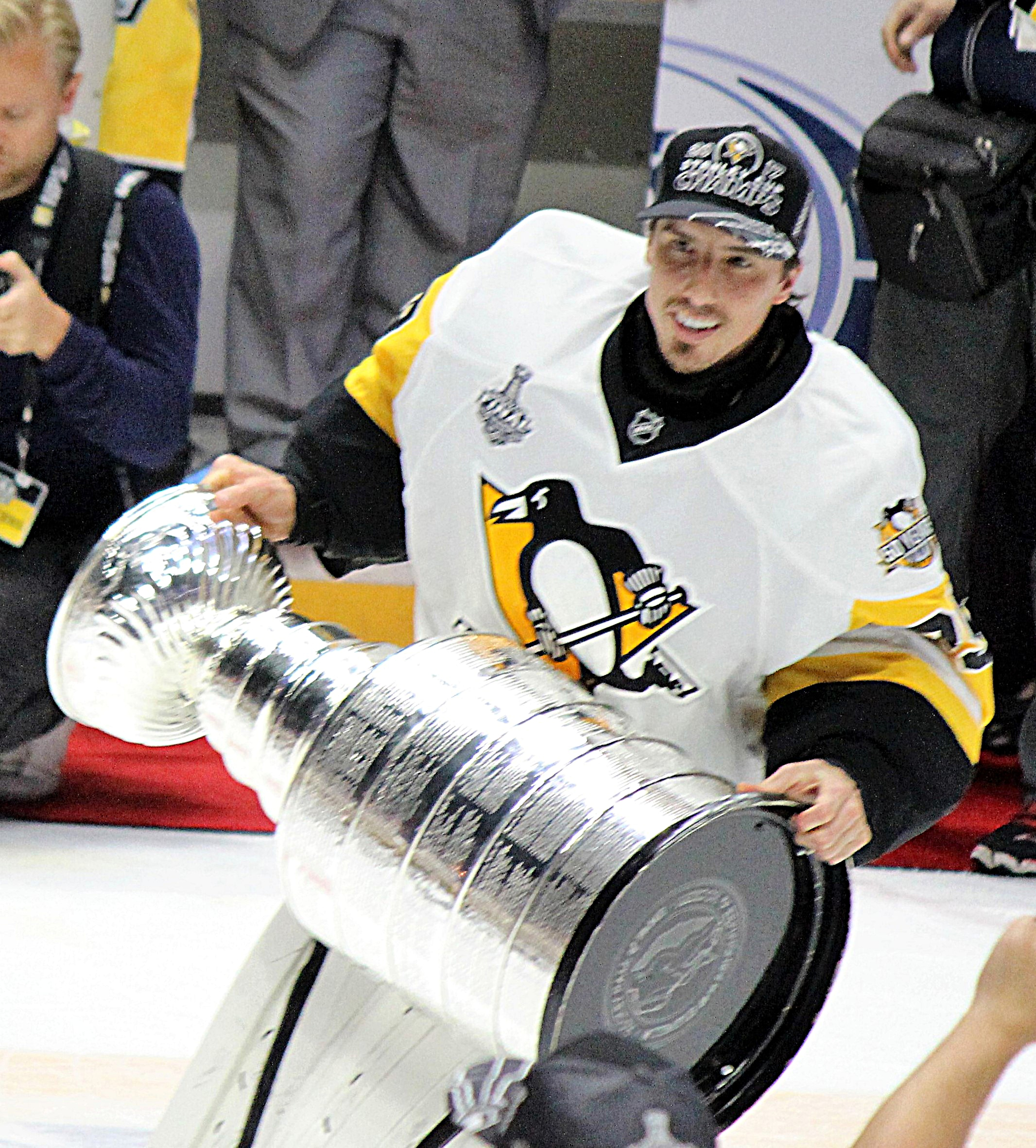
Fleury with the Stanley Cup in 2017

In the 2016–17 season Fleury played 38 games and accumulated 18 wins. When Matt Murray was injured during warm-ups of game one of the playoffs versus the Columbus Blue Jackets, Fleury took the starting position and led the Penguins to a 3–1 win. Fleury continued to lead the Penguins through the series, and his 49 saves on 51 shots in game five helped the Penguins win the series against the Blue Jackets 4–1. With Murray out, Fleury continued to be the starter for the Penguins through the second round versus the back-to-back Presidents' Trophy-winning Washington Capitals. The Penguins defeated the Capitals for the second consecutive time, this time in seven games, with Fleury shutting them out in game seven, and advanced to face the Ottawa Senators in the Eastern Conference finals. Following a 5–1 loss in game three, the Penguins opted to go with a healthy Murray, who remained the team's starter en route to a Stanley Cup championship victory, defeating the Nashville Predators in six games. The win was the third Stanley Cup of Fleury's career.

=== Vegas Golden Knights (2017–2021) ===
On June 21, 2017, with the emergence of Matt Murray, Fleury willingly waived his no-trade and no-movement clauses to be left exposed by the Penguins for the 2017 NHL expansion draft, where he was subsequently selected by the Vegas Golden Knights. Pittsburgh also traded their second round pick in the 2020 entry draft as an incentive for Vegas to select Fleury, in order for the team to be relieved of his nearly $6 million cap hit. He stopped 45 of 46 shots in the Golden Knights' first NHL game, a 2–1 victory over the Dallas Stars. On October 15, 2017, Fleury was placed on long-term injured reserve (LTIR) after taking a knee to the head from Anthony Mantha of the Detroit Red Wings on October 13. He was activated off LTIR on December 10, 2017, after missing 25 games. Fleury was chosen to represent Vegas during the 2018 NHL All-Star Game. During the NHL All-Star Weekend, he won the inaugural Save Streak competition where he saved 14 consecutive shootout attempts. On March 12, 2018, against the Philadelphia Flyers, Fleury earned his 400th career win with a final score of 3–2.

Fleury started for the Knights during the first round of the 2018 playoffs. On April 17, 2018, the Golden Knights were able to secure a 4–0 record over the Los Angeles Kings to sweep the first round. On May 6, after Fleury posted a shutout, the Golden Knights were able to move on to the Western Conference finals by beating the San Jose Sharks in game six of their playoff series. On May 20, 2018, Fleury led the Golden Knights to a victory over the Winnipeg Jets in the Western Conference finals, which allowed Fleury to earn a shot at a fourth Stanley Cup. During the playoffs a Vegas casino created a chocolate sculpture showing him doing a butterfly. Fleury was in goal for each game of the Golden Knights' five-game loss to the Washington Capitals in the 2018 Stanley Cup Final.

In the 2018 off-season, Fleury re-signed with the Knights on a three-year, $21 million contract. Because of his stellar play to start the 2018–19 season, Fleury was again selected to represent the Golden Knights in the 2019 NHL All-Star Game for the second straight year. At the time of the All-Star Game, Fleury led the NHL in wins (27) and shutouts (6). In game seven of Vegas' first round playoff series against the San Jose Sharks, Fleury and the Golden Knights gave up four goals in four minutes after a 5-minute major penalty was assessed to the Golden Knights when Cody Eakin cross-checked Sharks' forward Joe Pavelski. The Golden Knights ultimately lost game seven and the series to the Sharks.

During the 2019–20 season, Fleury posted a 2.77 goals against average and .905 save percentage, starting 48 games. That same season, Vegas made a trade for Robin Lehner from the Chicago Blackhawks, sending goalie Malcolm Subban, defenseman prospect Slava Demin, and a second-round pick to the team, allowing Fleury to share the net as a tandem with Lehner. On November 19, against the Toronto Maple Leafs, he earned his 450th career win. During the game, he made a key save with four minutes left in the third period on a shot from Nic Petan, who had a wide-open net, forcing Fleury to make a diving glove stop, securing a 4–2 victory. During that season, Fleury was invited to participate in the 2020 NHL All-Star Game. However, he declined the offer, which resulted in a one-game suspension from the league. Fleury played sparingly during the 2020 playoffs, largely serving as Lehner's backup as the Golden Knights returned to the conference finals, losing to the Dallas Stars in five games.

The pandemic-shortened 2020–21 season saw Fleury have a bounce back from a mediocre 2019–20 campaign. At the age of 36, Fleury recorded a career-best 1.98 goals against average and a .928 save percentage, helping the Golden Knights to their third final four appearance in four seasons. In game three of the semifinals against the Montreal Canadiens, Fleury misplayed the puck behind his net, coughing up the puck to Josh Anderson, who tied the game with 1:55 left in regulation time and later scored the overtime winner to give the Canadiens a 2–1 series lead. As a result, Lehner started in net for the Golden Knights in game four, which they won in overtime to even the series at 2. Fleury returned in game five, but the Golden Knights lost 4–1 and the Canadiens took a 3–2 series lead, so Lehner played in game six which the Canadiens won in overtime to eliminate the Golden Knights and advance to the 2021 Stanley Cup Final. At the end of the season, Fleury was named to the Second All-Star Team, and awarded his first Vezina Trophy and first William M. Jennings Trophy.

=== Chicago Blackhawks (2021–2022) ===
On July 27, 2021, with the Golden Knights in need of salary cap space, Fleury was traded to the Chicago Blackhawks in exchange for minor league forward Mikael Hakkarainen, making Fleury the first goaltender since Dominik Hašek to be traded as the defending Vezina Trophy winner. According to both Fleury and his agent Allan Walsh, Fleury was not notified by the Golden Knights about the trade, and the two learned about it on Twitter. After being traded, Fleury reportedly contemplated retirement. However, on August 1, Fleury announced that he intended to play for the Blackhawks in the 2021–22 season.

Through six starts, Fleury posted a .888 save percentage and 3.92 goals against average, recording his first win as a Blackhawk on November 1, 2021, in a 5–1 win against the Ottawa Senators. On December 9, Fleury reached his 500th win in a shutout against the Montreal Canadiens, becoming the third goaltender in NHL history to reach the mark (after Patrick Roy and Martin Brodeur). On January 8, 2022, Fleury became the first goaltender in NHL history to beat all 32 teams in a win against the Vegas Golden Knights.

With the Blackhawks struggling and pivoting into a team rebuild, the possibility of trading Fleury became a subject of intense speculation in the leadup to the 2022 trade deadline, given his elite reputation and the impending expiration of his contract. Any such trade was complicated by a gentlemen's agreement that former Blackhawks general manager Stan Bowman had made with Fleury in convincing him not to retire, wherein he would not be traded without his consent. New general manager Kyle Davidson stated that he intended to honour that arrangement. For his part, Fleury said "If I move, I would love a chance to win. That's what I play for, and that's what I love. But it's still a big 'if' at this point."

=== Minnesota Wild (2022–2025) ===
On March 21, 2022, Fleury was traded to the Minnesota Wild in exchange for a conditional 2022 second-round pick, which would become a first-round pick if the Wild reached the 2022 Western Conference finals with Fleury winning four games in the process. Bill Guerin, the general manager of the Wild, was formerly a teammate of Fleury's on the Penguins. Fleury made his debut with the Wild in a March 26 game against the Columbus Blue Jackets, backstopping them to a 3–2 overtime victory. After the game, a fan threw a bouquet of flowers on the ice, which Fleury stated that was the first time that has ever happened.

Fleury recorded a 9–2–0 record with a .910 save percentage in 11 regular season games with the Wild. The team's other goaltender, Cam Talbot, had gone 8–0–3 with a .925 save percentage since Fleury's arrival, as a result of which there was debate as to who the team would choose to start the first round of the Stanley Cup playoffs against the St. Louis Blues. Ultimately, the nod was given to Fleury. With Fleury in net the Wild initially took a 2–1 series lead, before losing the fourth and fifth games to face elimination in game six. Fleury was replaced by Talbot, but the Wild were eliminated by the Blues 4 games to 2.

On July 7, 2022, Fleury opted to forgo free agency and signed a two-year, $7 million contract extension to remain with the Wild. The Wild's decision to extend Fleury caused conflict with Talbot, who was subsequently traded to the Ottawa Senators in exchange for Filip Gustavsson. On October 30, Fleury earned his 62nd shootout win and became the leader in NHL career shootout wins when the Wild defeated the Blackhawks. Gustavsson would outperform Fleury for much of the middle of the season, leading to some speculation as to who would serve as the team's starter. Fleury acknowledged his difficulties, assessing he had "been in [his] head probably too much." His play improved as the Wild headed into March, embarking on a lengthy points streak.

On December 31, 2023, Fleury played his 1,000th NHL game, becoming just the fourth goaltender to reach the mark. On January 15, 2024, Fleury became the second-winningest goaltender in NHL history after earning his 552nd win in the Wild's 5–0 victory against the New York Islanders. Surpassing Patrick Roy on the all-time wins list, he moved up behind Martin Brodeur, who holds the record.

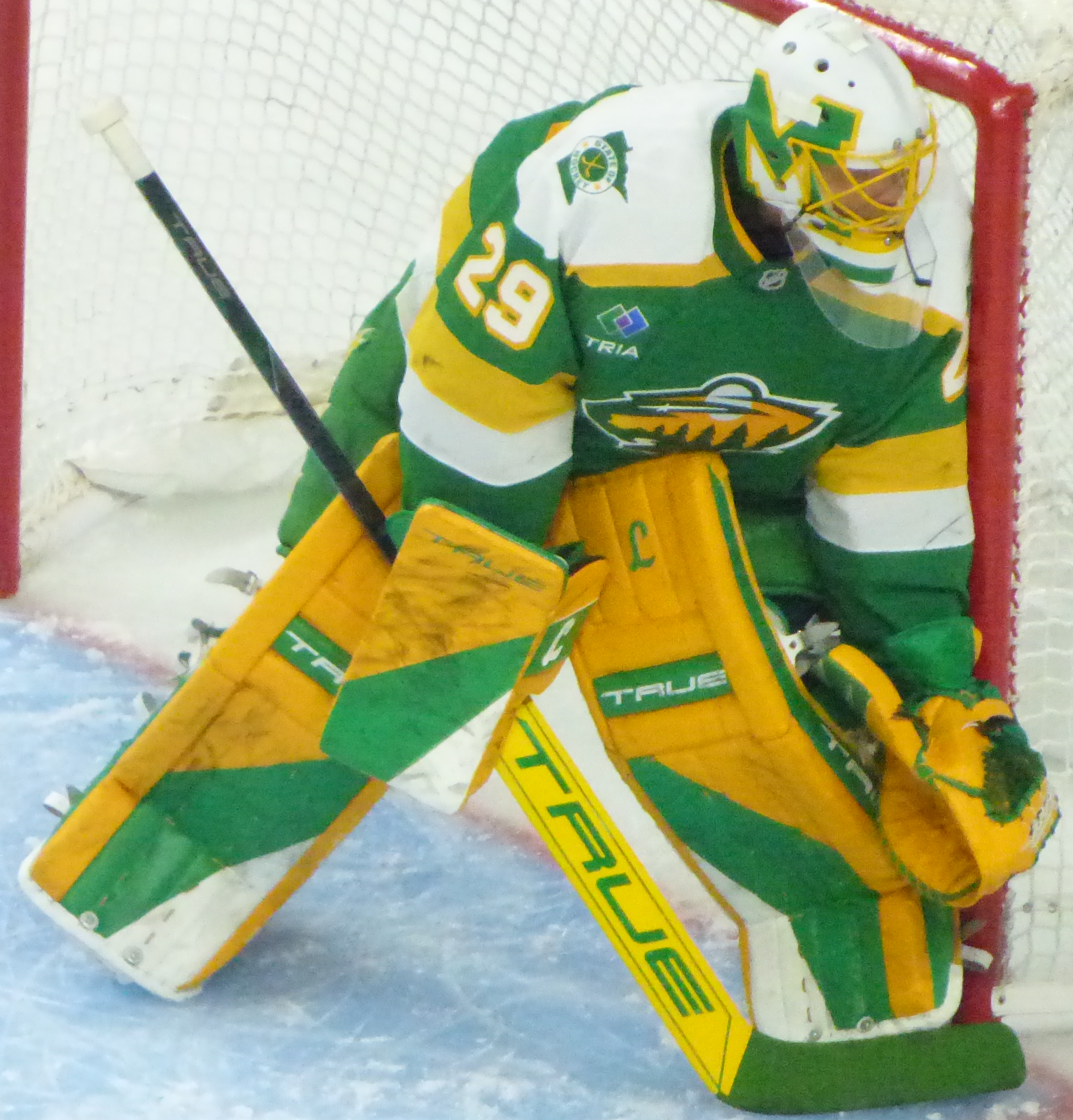
Fleury with the Minnesota Wild during his final season in 2025

On April 9, 2024, the Wild were eliminated from playoff contention, ending Fleury's 17-year playoff streak, as he had last missed the playoffs with Pittsburgh in 2006. On April 17, he signed a 1-year, $2.5 million extension with the Wild, stating he would retire at the end of the 2024–25 season. After a season-long retirement tour, Fleury played his last regular-season game on April 15, 2025; with the Wild having clinched a playoff berth by securing an overtime point, starting goaltender Filip Gustavsson voluntarily exited the game, allowing Fleury to enter and make five saves in a 3–2 overtime victory for Minnesota, earning him his 575th career win. Fleury played his final NHL game in game five of the Wild's first-round playoff series against the Golden Knights on April 29, entering in relief of an ill Gustavsson in the third period and stopping six shots before allowing a game-winning goal to Brett Howden four minutes into overtime. Fleury's appearance in game five marked the 18th year he'd played in the postseason, setting a new record among goaltenders for playoff seasons, and surpassing the record he previously jointly held with Martin Brodeur and Patrick Roy. The Wild were eliminated with a 3–2 loss in game six, with Fleury receiving a celebratory send-off from both teams and Wild fans in the Xcel Energy Center. Fleury was a finalist for the Bill Masterton Memorial Trophy, awarded by the Professional Hockey Writers' Association to "the player who best exemplifies the qualities of perseverance, sportsmanship and dedication to hockey."

=== Return to Pittsburgh and retirement (2025) ===
Despite retiring upon the conclusion of the 2024–25 season, on July 1, 2025, the opening day of NHL free agency, five teams called Fleury's representation with one-year contract offers to play in the 2025–26 season. On September 12, the Penguins announced Fleury's return on a professional tryout contract for the 2025–26 preseason, with Fleury intending only to play in the team's September 27 preseason game against the Columbus Blue Jackets. Fleury played during the third period and stopped all eight Blue Jackets shots; despite the Penguins' 4–1 regulation victory, a ceremonial shootout followed, where he made two of three saves.

== Post-playing career ==
On August 20, 2026, the Penguins announced that Fleury alongside Larry Murphy, Jim Rutherford, & Jack McGregor were named to the Class of 2026 for induction into the Pittsburgh Penguins Hall of Fame on November 16th against the Ottawa Senators.

On September 17, 2026, Fleury was inducted into the QMJHL Hall of Fame.

== International play ==
Medal record

Representing Canada

Men's ice hockey

Winter Olympics
Gold medal – first place	2010 Vancouver	

World Junior Championships
Silver medal – second place	2003 Canada	
Silver medal – second place	2004 Finland	

Fleury won two silver medals with Canada at the World Junior Championships. He made his first appearance in 2003. Although Canada was defeated by Russia 3–2 in the gold medal game, Fleury posted a 1.57 goals against average and was named the top goaltender and tournament MVP.

Although Fleury was playing in the NHL the next year leading up to the tournament, the Pittsburgh Penguins lent him to Canada junior team. Fleury expressed a desire to remain with his NHL club, but Penguins management decided the high-profile tournament would be good for his development. He led Canada to the gold medal game for the second consecutive year, but made a costly mistake that lost his team the championship. With the game tied 3–3 with less than five minutes remaining in regulation, Fleury left his net to play the puck and avert a breakaway opportunity for Patrick O'Sullivan of the United States. Fleury's clearing attempt, however, hit his own defenceman, Braydon Coburn, and trickled into the net. This proved to be the difference, as the Americans held on for a 4–3 win.

On December 30, 2009, Fleury was named to Canada senior team for the 2010 Winter Olympics. He did not play in the tournament, however, as the goaltending duties were split between Martin Brodeur and Roberto Luongo, but still received a gold medal as Canada defeated the United States 3–2 in the final.

Following his retirement from the NHL at the end of the 2024–25 season, Fleury announced that he would join Team Canada for the 2025 World Championship. The event marked a reunion with former Penguins teammate Sidney Crosby, with Fleury saying "I think it'll be fun to go spend some time together and yell at him in practice a bit, keep him honest." In what were ultimately the final competitive games of his career, Fleury posted a 2–1 record in three group stage games with a 0.97 goals against average and .944 save percentage, while backing up Jordan Binnington; Canada was subsequently eliminated by Denmark in the quarterfinals, in a major upset defeat.

== Personal life ==
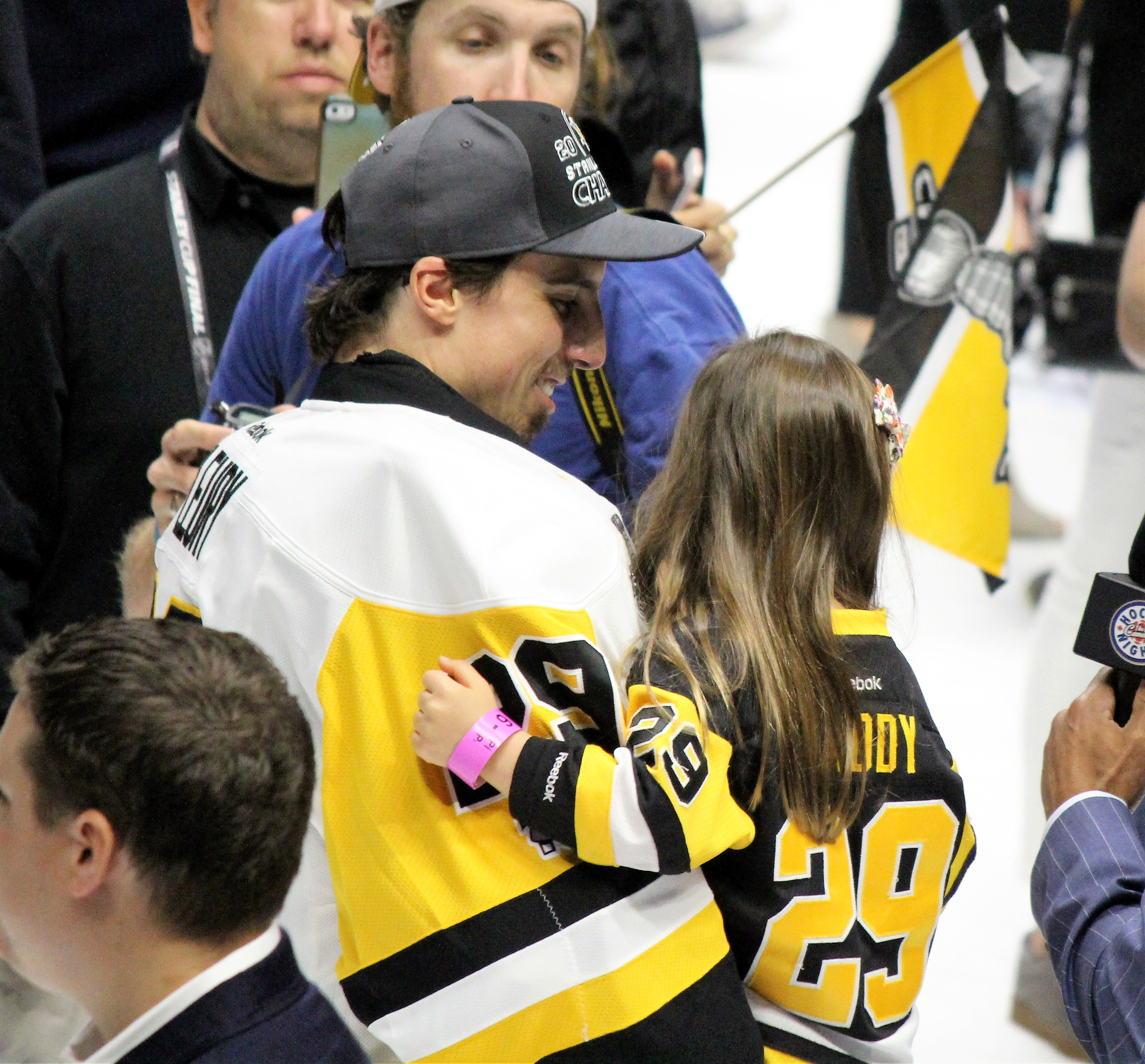
Fleury with his daughter after the Penguins' 2017 Stanley Cup win in Nashville

Fleury was born to André and France Fleury in Sorel-Tracy, Quebec, a town near Montreal. He has one sibling, his younger sister Marylène.

When he was first drafted, he lived with Mario Lemieux for a brief period of time as he searched for more permanent living arrangements.

Fleury married his longtime girlfriend Véronique Larosee in 2012, and the couple have two daughters and a son. She is of Abenaki and Mi'kmaq descent. In November 2023, the NHL forbade Fleury from wearing a custom mask he had had made in honor of his wife's Native heritage on the Wild's American Indian Heritage Night. In spite of the threat of fines for himself and the team, he wore the helmet during warm-ups, though he did not start the game. It was later reported that Fleury or the team would be unlikely to receive a fine for the decision. The mask was also put up for auction by the Minnesota Wild Foundation with proceeds going towards the American Indian Family Center. The auction raised a total of $66,605.

Fleury is known by the nickname "Flower", derived from the English translation of his last name (fleuri is "in bloom", or "in flower", in French). His goaltender masks always feature a fleur-de-lis on the backplate (in addition to the initials EFGT, honouring his four grandparents in memoriam), and have frequently featured some sort of flower on the front artwork as well.

Throughout his career, Fleury gained a reputation as a prankster to both teammates and opponents, with many of his pranks being uploaded to social media.

== Career statistics ==
=== Regular season and playoffs ===
Bold indicates led league

			Regular season										Playoffs
Season	Team	League	GP	W	L	T	OTL	MIN	GA	SO	GAA	SV%	GP	W	L	MIN	GA	SO	GAA	SV%
1999–00	Charles–Lemoyne Riverains	QMAAA	15	4	9	0	—	780	36	1	2.77	.896	—	—	—	—	—	—	—	—
2000–01	Cape Breton Screaming Eagles	QMJHL	35	12	13	2	—	1,705	115	0	4.05	.886	2	0	1	32	4	0	3.15	.905
2001–02	Cape Breton Screaming Eagles	QMJHL	55	26	14	8	—	3,043	141	2	2.78	.915	16	9	7	1,003	55	0	3.29	.900
2002–03	Cape Breton Screaming Eagles	QMJHL	51	17	24	6	—	2,889	162	2	3.36	.910	4	0	4	228	17	0	4.47	.894
2003–04	Pittsburgh Penguins	NHL	21	4	14	2	—	1,154	70	1	3.64	.896	—	—	—	—	—	—	—	—
2003–04	Cape Breton Screaming Eagles	QMJHL	10	8	1	1	—	606	20	0	1.98	.933	4	1	3	251	13	0	3.10	.886
2003–04	Wilkes-Barre/Scranton Penguins	AHL	—	—	—	—	—	—	—	—	—	—	2	0	1	92	6	0	3.90	.800
2004–05	Wilkes-Barre/Scranton Penguins	AHL	54	26	19	4	—	3,029	127	5	2.52	.901	4	0	2	151	11	0	4.36	.843
2005–06	Wilkes-Barre/Scranton Penguins	AHL	12	10	2	—	0	727	19	0	1.57	.939	5	2	3	311	18	0	3.48	.883
2005–06	Pittsburgh Penguins	NHL	50	13	27	—	6	2,809	152	1	3.25	.898	—	—	—	—	—	—	—	—
2006–07	Pittsburgh Penguins	NHL	67	40	16	—	9	3,905	184	5	2.83	.906	5	1	4	287	18	0	3.76	.880
2007–08	Pittsburgh Penguins	NHL	35	19	10	—	2	1,857	72	4	2.33	.921	**20**	**14**	6	**1,251**	41	**3**	1.97	.933
2007–08	Wilkes-Barre/Scranton Penguins	AHL	5	3	2	—	0	297	7	0	1.42	.950	—	—	—	—	—	—	—	—
2008–09	Pittsburgh Penguins	NHL	62	35	18	—	7	3,641	162	4	2.67	.912	24	**16**	8	**1,447**	**63**	0	2.61	.908
2009–10	Pittsburgh Penguins	NHL	67	37	21	—	6	3,798	168	1	2.65	.905	13	7	6	798	37	1	2.78	.891
2010–11	Pittsburgh Penguins	NHL	65	36	20	—	5	3,695	143	3	2.32	.918	7	3	4	405	17	1	2.52	.899
2011–12	Pittsburgh Penguins	NHL	67	42	17	—	4	3,896	153	3	2.36	.913	6	2	4	337	26	0	4.63	.834
2012–13	Pittsburgh Penguins	NHL	33	23	8	—	0	1,858	74	1	2.39	.916	5	2	2	290	17	1	3.52	.883
2013–14	Pittsburgh Penguins	NHL	64	39	18	—	5	3,792	150	5	2.37	.915	13	7	6	800	32	**2**	2.40	.915
2014–15	Pittsburgh Penguins	NHL	64	34	20	—	9	3,776	146	**10**	2.32	.920	5	1	4	312	11	0	2.12	.927
2015–16	Pittsburgh Penguins	NHL	58	35	17	—	6	3,463	132	5	2.29	.921	2	0	1	79	4	0	3.04	.875
2016–17	Pittsburgh Penguins	NHL	38	18	10	—	7	2,126	107	1	3.02	.909	15	9	6	867	37	2	2.56	.924
2017–18	Vegas Golden Knights	NHL	46	29	13	—	4	2,674	100	4	2.24	.927	20	13	7	1,259	47	**4**	2.24	.927
2018–19	Vegas Golden Knights	NHL	61	35	21	—	5	3,636	152	8	2.51	.913	7	3	4	467	21	1	2.70	.909
2019–20	Vegas Golden Knights	NHL	49	27	16	—	5	2,881	133	5	2.77	.905	4	3	1	238	9	0	2.27	.910
2020–21	Vegas Golden Knights	NHL	36	26	10	—	0	2,147	71	6	1.98	.928	16	9	7	973	33	1	2.04	.918
2021–22	Chicago Blackhawks	NHL	45	19	21	—	5	2,627	129	4	2.95	.908	—	—	—	—	—	—	—	—
2021–22	Minnesota Wild	NHL	11	9	2	—	0	658	30	0	2.74	.910	5	2	3	297	15	0	3.04	.906
2022–23	Minnesota Wild	NHL	46	24	16	—	4	2,655	126	2	2.85	.908	2	0	1	77	7	0	5.48	.811
2023–24	Minnesota Wild	NHL	40	17	15	—	5	2,232	111	2	2.98	.895	—	—	—	—	—	—	—	—
2024–25	Minnesota Wild	NHL	26	14	9	—	1	1,390	68	1	2.93	.899	1	0	1	24	1	0	2.49	.857
NHL totals			1,051	575	339	2	95	60,669	2,633	76	2.60	.912	170	92	75	10,207	436	16	2.56	.911

=== International ===
Year	Team	Event	Result	GP	W	L	T	MIN	GA	SO	GAA	SV%
2003	Canada	WJC	2nd place, silver medalist(s)	5	5	0	0	267	7	1	1.57	.927
2004	Canada	WJC	2nd place, silver medalist(s)	5	4	1	0	299	9	1	1.81	.920
2010	Canada	OLY	1st place, gold medalist(s)	—	—	—	—	—	—	—	—	—
2025	Canada	WC	5th	3	2	1	0	185	3	0	0.97	.944
Junior totals				10	8	2	0	566	16	2	1.69	.924
Senior totals				3	2	1	0	185	3	0	0.97	.944

== Awards and honours ==
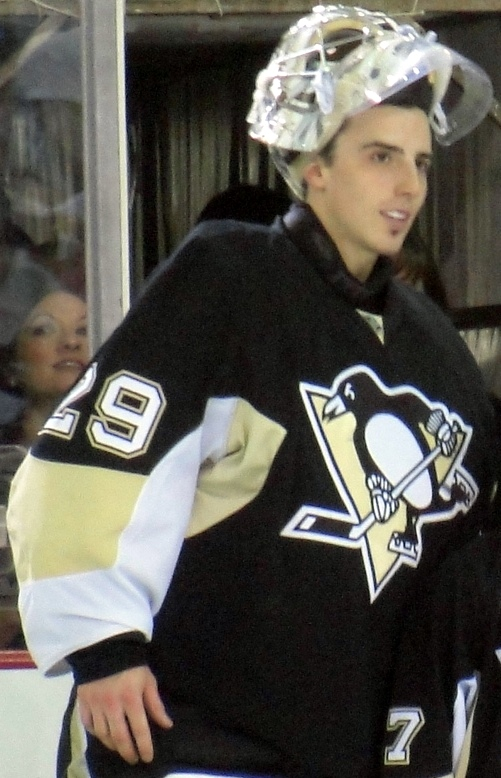
Fleury accepting the Aldege "Baz" Bastien Memorial Good Guy Award in 2010

Award	Year	Ref
QMJHL
Mike Bossy Trophy	2003	
Telus Defensive Player of the Year	2003	
QMJHL Second All-Star Team	2003	
CHL/NHL Top Prospects Game	2003	
CHL Third All-Star Team	2003	
QMJHL Hall of Fame	2026	
NHL
NHL Rookie of the Month	October 2003	
Stanley Cup Champion	2009, 2016, 2017	
NHL All-Star Game	2011, 2015, 2018, 2019	
NHL All-Decade First Team	2010s	
NHL Fan Choice Award (save of the year)	2019, 2020, 2021	
William M. Jennings Trophy	2021	
Vezina Trophy	2021	
NHL Second All-Star Team	2021	
NHL Quarter-Century Team	2025	
International
WJC Top Goaltender	2003	
WJC MVP	2003	
Pittsburgh Penguins
Aldege "Baz" Bastien Memorial Good Guy Award	2010, 2012	
A. T. Caggiano Memorial Booster Club Award	2011, 2013, 2014, 2015	
Defensive Player of the Year	2012	
The Edward J. DeBartolo Community Service Award	2006, 2014	
Team MVP	2011, 2015	
Players' Player Award	2015, 2016, 2017	
Pittsburgh Penguins 1st Quarter-Century Team	2025	
Pittsburgh Penguins Hall of Fame	2026	

== Notes ==
Awards and achievements
Preceded by Pierre-Marc Bouchard	Winner of the Mike Bossy Trophy; 2002–03	Succeeded by Alexandre Picard
Preceded by Rick Nash	NHL first overall draft pick 2003	Succeeded by Alexander Ovechkin
Preceded by Ryan Whitney	Pittsburgh Penguins first-round draft pick 2003	Succeeded by Evgeni Malkin
Preceded by Connor Hellebuyck	Winner of the Vezina Trophy; 2021	Succeeded by Igor Shesterkin
Preceded by Tuukka Rask and Jaroslav Halák	Winner of the William M. Jennings Trophy; 2021; With: Robin Lehner	Succeeded by Frederik Andersen and Antti Raanta
